= List of people declared venerable by Pope Francis =

This article is a list of people that were proclaimed venerable, based on the recognition of their heroic virtues, by Pope Francis. From his 2013 election to the papacy until his death in 2025, 556 people were proclaimed as such, of whom 43 would later be beatified by the same pope.

== 2013 ==
=== March 27, 2013 ===
1. Angelo Fontanarosa (1881-1966)
2. Antoine Kowalczyk, OMI (1893-1947)
3. Eladio Mozas Santamera (1837-1897)
4. Manuel Aparici Navarro (1902-1964)
5. Moisés Lira Serafín, MSPS (1893-1950) (beatified on 14 September 2024)
6. Olinto Marella (1882-1969) (beatified on 4 October 2020)
7. Sílvia Cardoso Ferreira da Silva (1882-1950)

=== May 2, 2013 ===
1. Joaquim Rosselló i Ferrà (1833-1909)
2. Teresa Janina Kierocińska (1885-1946)

=== June 3, 2013 ===
1. Giulia Crostarosa (1696-1755) (beatified on 18 June 2016)
2. João de Oliveira Matos Ferreira (1879-1962)
3. Nicola Mazza (1790-1865)
4. Teresa Toda Juncosa (1826-1898)

=== July 5, 2013 ===
1. Bernardo Felipe Fromental (1895-1978)
2. Carmen Elena Rendiles Martínez (1903-1977) (beatified on 16 June 2018, canonized on 19 October 2025)
3. Giuseppe Lazzati (1909-1986)
4. Maria Isabel Caldeira (1889-1962)
5. Nicola D'Onofrio (1943-1964)

=== October 9, 2013 ===
1. Amato Ronconi, TOFS (1226-1292) (cultus confirmed on 17 April 1776, canonized on 23 November 2014)
2. Angela Giorgi (1882-1945)
3. Attilio Giordani, ASC (1913-1972)
4. Marie-Élisabeth Turgeon (1840-1881) (beatified on 26 April 2015)
5. Mary Jane Wilson (1840-1916)
6. Pio Alberto del Corona, OP (1837-1912) (beatified on 19 September 2015)

=== October 31, 2013 ===
1. Celestina Bottego (1895-1980)
2. Nano Nagle (1718-1784)
3. Olga Gugelmo (1910-1943)

=== December 9, 2013 ===
1. Clemente Fuhl (1874-1935)
2. Marcell Boldizsar Marton (1877-1966)
3. Maurice-Marie-Matthieu Garrigou (1766-1852)
4. Maria Oliva Bonaldo (1893-1976)
5. Maria Orsola Rivata (1897-1987)
6. Maria Rosa Teresa Gay Tibau (1813-1884)
7. Orsola Mezzini (1853-1919)
8. Raphael Cordero (1790-1868)
9. Romano Bottegal, OCSO (1921-1978)
10. Rosalie Cadron-Jetté, SM (1794-1864)

=== December 17, 2013 ===
1. Jerzy Ciesielski (1929-1970)
2. Manuel Herranz Estables (1880-1968)

== 2014 ==
=== January 27, 2014 ===
1. Elisabetta Sanna Porcu, TOFS (1788-1857) (beatified on 17 September 2016)
2. Giuseppe Girelli (1886-1978)
3. Marie-Anne-Marcelle Mallet (1805-1871)
4. María Benita Arias (1822-1894)
5. Noeme Cinque (1913-1988)
6. Virginia de Brincat (1862-1952)
7. Zakarias Salterain Bizkarra (1887-1957)

=== February 7, 2014 ===
1. Guglielmo Giacomo Ghilardi (1858-1937)
2. Jesús María Echavarría Aguirre (1858-1954)
3. María Rafaela Rodríguez Xuarez De La Guardia (1923-1956)

=== April 3, 2014 ===
1. Adolfo Barberis (1884-1967)
2. Francisco Simón Ródenas (1849-1914)
3. Joseph Staub (1876-1936)
4. Juana Clara de la Concepción Sanchez Garcia (1902-1973)
5. Luigi Rocchi (1932-1979)
6. Maria Dulce Rodrigues dos Santos (1901-1972)
7. Maria Josephina Teresa Marcucci (1888-1960)
8. Sebastián Elorza Arizmendi (1882-1942)

=== April 15, 2014 ===
1. Alain-Marie Guynot de Boismenu, MSC (1870-1953)
2. Wilhelm Janauschek (1859-1926)

=== May 9, 2014 ===
1. Caroline-Barbe Colchen Carré de Malberg (1829-1891)
2. Giacomo Abbondo (1720-1788) (beatified on 11 June 2016)
3. Jacint Alegre i Pujals (1874-1930)

=== June 12, 2014 ===
1. Eugenio Reffo, CSI (1843-1925)
2. Frances Margaret Taylor, PSMG (1832-1900)
3. Itala Mela, OSB (1904-1957) (beatified on 10 June 2017)
4. Luigi Savaré (1878-1949)
5. Giuseppa Scandola, MSV (1849-1903)
6. Uberto Mori, TOSF (1926-1989)

=== July 8, 2014 ===
1. Antônio Ferreira Viçoso, CM (1787-1875)
2. Auguste Arribat (1879-1963)
3. Elena Da Persico (1869-1948)
4. Marcello Candia (1916-1983)
5. Maria Carlotta Fontana (1870-1935)
6. Saturnino López Novoa (1830-1905)
7. Veronica of the Passion, OCD (1823-1906)

=== November 7, 2014 ===
1. Hildebrand Gregori, OSB Silv (1894-1985)
2. Jeanne Mance (1606-1673)
3. John Sullivan, SJ (1861-1933) (beatified on 13 May 2017)
4. Marthe Robin (1902-1981)
5. Maximiliano Valdés Subercaseaux, OFMCap (1908-1982)
6. Pelágio Sauter, CSsR (1878-1961)
7. Raimundo Calcagno (1888-1964)
8. Silvio Dissegna (1967-1979)

=== December 6, 2014 ===
1. Elisabetta Tasca Serena (1899-1978)
2. Francesca Paola Prestigiacomo (1858-1948)
3. María Séiquer Gayá (1891-1975)
4. Marie Vojtěcha Hasmandová (1914-1988)
5. Práxedes Fernández García (1886-1936)

== 2015 ==
=== January 22, 2015 ===
1. Aloysius Schwartz (1930-1992)
2. Cointa Jauregui Oses (1875-1954)
3. Elisabeth Maria Satoko Kitahara (1929-1958)
4. Luis De Trelles y Nuogerol (1819-1891)
5. Teresa Luisa Gardi, TOFS (1769-1837)
6. Virginia Blanco Tardío (1916-1990)
7. Władysław Bukowiński (1904-1974) (beatified on 11 September 2016)

=== February 3, 2015 ===
1. Giovanni Bacile (1880-1941)

=== March 18, 2015 ===
1. Elisa Baldo Foresti (1862-1926)
2. Francesco Gattola (1822-1899)
3. Jadwiga Jaroszewska (1900-1937)
4. Juana de la Cruz Vázquez Gutiérrez, TOR (1481-1534) (cultus confirmed on 25 November 2024)
5. Maria Orsola Bussone (1954-1970)
6. Mary Aikenhead (1787-1858)
7. Petar Barbarić, SJ (1874-1897)

=== May 5, 2015 ===
1. Ante Antić (1893-1965)
2. Brigida Maria Postorino (1865-1960)
3. Domenica Bedonni Bernardini (1889-1971)
4. Jacinto Vera (1813-1881) (beatified on 6 May 2023)
5. Juliette Colbert de Barolo (1786-1864)
6. Rafaela Martinez-Cañavate Ballesteros (1915-1991)
7. Sergio Bernardini (1882-1966)

=== June 5, 2015 ===
1. Antonio Celona (1873-1952)
2. Marcello Labor (1890-1954)
3. Ottorino Zanon (1915-1972)
4. Rachele Lalia (1839-1914)

=== July 16, 2015 ===
1. Agostino Ramírez Barba (1881-1967)
2. Andrey Sheptytsky, OSBM (1865-1944)
3. Elisa Miceli (1904-1976)
4. Giuseppe Carraro (1899-1980)
5. Isabel Méndez Herrero, SSJ (1924-1953)
6. Maria del Refugio Aguilar y Torres (1866-1937)
7. Marie-Teresa Dupouy Bordes, SSCC (1873-1953)
8. Simpliciano Maresca, OFM (1827-1898)

=== September 30, 2015 ===
1. Antonio Filomeno Maria Losito (1838-1917)
2. Franciszek Blachnicki (1921-1987)
3. Giovanni Folci (1890-1963)
4. Hanna Helena Chrzanowska, OSB (1902-1973) (beatified on 28 April 2018)
5. Jose Rivera Ramírez (1925-1991)
6. Juan Manuel Martín del Campo (1917-1996)
7. Maria Benedetta Frey (1836-1913)

=== December 14, 2015 ===
1. Angelo Ramazzotti (1800-1861)
2. Emanuela Maria Maddalena Kalb (1899-1986)
3. Giovanni Schiavo, CSI (1903-1967) (beatified on 28 October 2017)
4. José María Arizmendiarrieta (1915-1976)
5. Joseph Vithayathil (1865-1964)
6. María Emilia Riquelme y Zayas (1847-1940) (beatified on 9 November 2019)
7. Maria Speranza della Croce (1890-1967)
8. Nicola Wolf (1756-1832)
9. Teresa Rosa Ferdinanda de Saldanha Oliveira y Sousa (1837-1916)
10. Teresio Olivelli (1916-1945) (beatified on 3 February 2018)
11. Venanzio Maria Quadri (1916-1937)
12. William Gagnon, OH (1905-1972)

=== December 17, 2015 ===
1. Enrico Hahn (1800-1882)
2. Giuseppe Ambrosoli (1923-1987) (beatified on 20 November 2022)
3. Leonardo Lanzuela Martinez (1894-1976)

== 2016 ==
=== January 21, 2016 ===
1. Giuseppe Antonio Migliavacca, OFMCap (1849-1909) (beatified on 7 October 2017)
2. Maria Velotti (1826-1886) (beatified on 26 September 2020)

=== March 3, 2016 ===
1. Bernardo Mattio (1845-1914)
2. Bianca Piccolomini Clementini (1875-1959)
3. Enrico Battista Stanislao Verjus (1860-1892)
4. Giovanni Battista Quilici (1791-1844)
5. Maria Nieves Sánchez y Fernandez (1900-1978)
6. Quirico Pignalberi, OFMConv (1891-1982)
7. Stephen Ferrando, SDB (1895-1978)
8. Teodora Campostrini (1788-1860)

=== April 26, 2016 ===
1. Caterina Carrasco Tenorio (1840-1917)
2. Ilia Corsaro (1897-1977)
3. Maria Consiglio dello Spirito Santo (1845-1900)
4. Maria Laura Baraggia (1851-1923)
5. María Montserrat Grases Garcia (1941-1959)
6. Sosio Del Prete (1885-1952)
7. Tommaso Choe Yang-Eop (1821-1861)
8. Venanzio Katarzyniec (1889-1921)

=== May 9, 2016 ===
1. Rafaél Manuel Almansa Riaño, OFM (1840-1927)

=== June 14, 2016 ===
1. Antonín Cyril Stojan (1851-1923)
2. Bernardo de Vasconcelos (1902-1932)
3. Luigi Lo Verde (1910-1932)
4. Maria Elisa Oliver Molina (1869-1931)
5. Maria di Gesù dell'Amore Misericordioso (1899-1973)
6. Maria Guzmán Figueroa (1897-1967)
7. Vicente Garrido Pastor (1896-1975)

=== July 8, 2016 ===
1. Alphonse Gallegos, OAR (1931-1991)
2. Andrés García Acosta (1800-1853)
3. Giacomo Viale (1830-1912)
4. Giuseppe Marchetti, CS (1869-1896)
5. Maria Pia Notari (1847-1919)
6. Raffaele Sánchez García (1911-1973)

=== October 10, 2016 ===
1. Agnese Pacifica Panas, OSCCap (1896-1963) (beatified on 9 October 2022)
2. Luis Zambrano Blanco (1909-1983)
3. Maria Teresa Spinelli (1789-1850)
4. Tiburcio Arnáiz Muñoz, SJ (1865-1926) (beatified on 20 October 2018)

=== December 1, 2016 ===
1. Caterina Aurelia del Preziossimo Sangue (1833-1905)
2. Guglielmo Massaia, OFMCap (1809-1889)
3. José Bau Burguet (1867-1932)
4. Leonia Maria Nastał (1903-1940)
5. Luz Rodríguez-Casanova y García San Miguel (1873-1949)
6. Mario Ciceri (1900-1945) (beatified on 30 April 2022)
7. Nunzio Russo (1841-1906)
8. Suzanne Aubert (1835-1926)

=== December 21, 2016 ===
1. Clelia Merloni (1861-1930) (beatified on 3 November 2018)
2. Egidio Marcelli, CP (1874-1953)
3. Isidoro Zorzano Ledesma (1902-1943)
4. Jean-Baptiste Fouque (1851-1926) (beatified on 30 September 2018)
5. Sebastiana Lladó Sala (1814-1899)

== 2017 ==
=== January 20, 2017 ===
1. Francesco Convertini, SDB (1898-1976)
2. Giuseppe Beschin, OFM (1880-1952)
3. Jan Tyranowski, OCD (1901-1947)
4. Joseph Vandor, SDB (1909-1979)
5. Juan Sáez Hurtado (1897-1982)
6. Raymundo Jardón Herrera (1887-1934)
7. Santina Maria Addolorata (1897-1981)

=== February 27, 2017 ===
1. Antonio Provolo (1801-1842)
2. Antonio Repiso Martínez, SJ (1856-1929)
3. Maria della Mercede Cabezas Terrero (1911-1993)
4. Maria Ripamonti (1909-1954) (beatified on 23 October 2021)
5. Octavio Ortiz Arrieta, SDB (1878-1958)
6. Pedro Herrero Rubio (1904-1978)
7. Vittorio Trancanelli (1944-1998)

=== March 23, 2017 ===
1. Daniela Zanetta (1962-1986)
2. Elena Raparelli (1893-1970)
3. Felice Rossini, OFMCap (1876-1924)

=== May 4, 2017 ===
1. Alessandro Nottegar (1943-1986)
2. Edvige Carboni (1880-1952) (beatified on 15 June 2019)
3. Elia Dalla Costa (1872-1961)
4. Francis-Xavier Nguyễn Văn Thuận (1928-2002)
5. Giovanna Meneghini (1868-1918)
6. Guadalupe Ortiz de Landázuri Fernández de Heredia (1916-1975) (beatified on 18 May 2019)
7. Vincenzina Cusmano SdP (1826-1894)

=== June 16, 2017 ===
1. Agostino Ernesto Castrillo, OFM (1904-1955)
2. António José de Sousa Barroso (1854-1918)
3. Beniamino Filon, OFMCap (1900-1948)
4. Giuseppina Operti (1871-1949)
5. Juan de Jesús López y González (1872-1950)
6. Maria Patlán Sánchez (1895-1970)

=== July 7, 2017 ===
1. Ismael Perdomo Borrero (1872-1950)
2. Maria Elisabetta Mazza (1886-1950)
3. Maria Gargani, TOFS (1892-1973) (beatified on 2 June 2018)
4. Paola de Jesus Gil Cano (1849-1913)
5. Piotr Kosiba, OFM (1855-1939)

=== October 9, 2017 ===
1. Aloiz Kashuba, OFMCap (1910-1977)
2. Caroline Baron (1820-1882)
3. Donizetti Tavares de Lima (1882-1961) (beatified on 23 November 2019)
4. Francesco Paolo Gravina (1800-1854)
5. Magín Morera y Feixas, SF (1908-1984)
6. Maria Llorença Llong (1463-1539) (beatified on 9 October 2021)
7. Róża Czacka (1876-1961) (beatified on 12 September 2021)

=== November 8, 2017 ===
1. Bernhard II of Baden (1428-1458) (cult confirmed on 16 September 1769)
2. Giovanni Maoloni, OFMCap (1873-1909)
3. Gregorio Fiorvanti, OFM (1822-1894)
4. Pope John Paul I (1912-1978) (beatified on 4 September 2022)
5. Teresa Fardella di Blasi (1867-1957)
6. Tomás Morales Pérez, SJ (1908-1994)

=== December 18, 2017 ===
1. Alonzo de Barcena, SJ (1530-1597)
2. Luiza Maria Andaluz Langstroth Figueira de Sousa (1877-1973)
3. Mariantonia Samà (1875-1953) (beatified on 3 October 2021)
4. Mariana de Manzanedo Herrera, OAR (1568-1638)
5. Marianna Orsi (1842-1885)
6. Patrick Peyton, CSC (1909-1992)
7. Paweł Klamans Smolikowski, CR (1849-1926)
8. Stefan Wyszyński (1901-1981) (beatified on 12 September 2021)

== 2018 ==
=== January 26, 2018 ===
1. Ambrogio Grittani (1907-1951)
2. Madeleine Delbrêl (1904-1964)

=== March 6, 2018 ===
1. Sandra Sabattini (1961-1984) (beatified on 24 October 2021)
2. Antonio Pietro Cortinovis, OFMCap (1885-1984)
3. Bernard Łubieński, CSsR (1846-1933)
4. Giustina Schiapparoli (1819-1877)
5. Maria Antonella Bordoni, TOSD (1916-1978)
6. Maria Schiapparoli (1815-1882)

=== April 14, 2018 ===
1. Costanza Ricci Curbastro (1856-1923)
2. Èlisabeth Bruyère (1818-1876)
3. Florenza Giovanna Profilio (1873-1956)
4. Justa Domínguez de Vidaurreta e Idoy (1875-1958)
5. Ludovico Longari, SSS (1889-1963)
6. Manuel Nunes Formigão (1883-1958)
7. Maria Di Majo (1888-1967)
8. Varghese Payapilly (1876-1929)

=== May 19, 2018 ===
1. Angela Maria Autsch, CSST (1900-1944)
2. August Hlond, SDB (1881-1948)
3. Coloma Antònia Martí y Valls, CDP (1860-1899)
4. Enrico Mauri (1883-1967)
5. Isora María del Tránsito Ocampo, OP (1841-1900)
6. Jean-Baptiste Berthier, MS (1840-1908)
7. John McAuliffe, SC (1886-1959)
8. Maria Edvige Zivelonghi, FdG (1919-1949)
9. Miguel Ángel Builes, MXY (1888-1971)
10. Pietro Uccelli, SX (1874-1954)
11. Pio Dellepiane, OM (1904-1976)
12. Wilhelm Eberschweiler, SJ (1837-1921)

=== July 5, 2018 ===
1. Alexia González-Barros y González (1971-1985)
2. Carlo Acutis (1991-2006) (beatified on 10 October 2020, canonized on 7 September 2025)
3. Giorgio La Pira (1904-1977)
4. Pietro Di Vitale (1916-1940)

=== November 7, 2018 ===
1. Alfredo Obviar (1889-1978)
2. Carme Badosa Cuatrecasas (1878-1918)
3. Giovanni Ciresola (1902-1987)
4. Giovanni Jacono (1873-1957)
5. Ludovico Coccapani, OFS (1849-1931)
6. Luigi Bosio (1909-1994)
7. Luigi Maria Ranieri, B. (1895-1918)
8. María Antonia Pereira Andrade, OCD (1700-1760)
9. Michał Giedroyć, OSA (1420-1485) (cultus confirmed on the same day)
10. Pasqualina Luciani, CP (1920-1954)
11. Rafaela Veintemilla Villacis (1836-1918)

=== December 21, 2018 ===
1. Angela Maria Boidi, CP (1908-1953)
2. Antonietta Giugliano (1909-1960)
3. Arcangelo Maria Biasi, OFMConv (1897-1929)
4. Augustine John Ukken (1880-1956)
5. Carlo Tancredi Falletti di Barolo (1782-1838)
6. Doroteo Hernández Vera (1901-1991)
7. Filomena D'Urso (1909-1954)
8. Giuseppe Codicè (1838-1915)
9. Jan Pietraszko (1911-1988)
10. José Estanislao Zavala López, OSA (1867-1947)
11. Józef Fordon, OFMConv (1862-1927)

== 2019 ==
=== January 15, 2019 ===
1. Anna Kaworek (1872-1936)
2. María Consuelo Sanjurjo Santos, SdeM (1892-1973)

=== February 12, 2019 ===
1. Maria Berenice Hencker, OP (1898-1993) (beatified on 29 October 2022)
2. Clorinda Letizia Formai (1876-1954)
3. Giovanni Battista Zuaboni (1880-1939)
4. József Mindszenty (1892-1975)
5. Manuel García Nieto, SJ (1894-1974)

=== March 19, 2019 ===
1. Francesco Maria di Francia (1853-1913)
2. Luisa Ferrari (1888-1984)
3. Maria Hueber (1653-1705)
4. Maria Teresa Camera (1818-1894)
5. Maria Teresa Gabrieli (1837-1908)

=== April 6, 2019 ===
1. Augustin Arnaud Pagés, FSC (1885-1966)
2. Carlo Cavina (1820-1880)
3. Damião de Bozzano, OFMCap (1898-1997)
4. Gaetana Tolomeo (1936-1997) (beatified on 3 October 2021)
5. Nelson Santana (1955-1964)
6. Pierina Lorenzina Giovanna Betrone, OSCCap (1903-1946)
7. Raffaele da Sant'Elia a Pianisi, OFMCap (1816-1901)

=== May 13, 2019 ===
1. Carlo Salerio, MEP (1827-1870)
2. Domingo Lázaro Castro, SM (1877-1935)
3. Hermínio Pinzetta, OFMCap (1911-1972)
4. Giovanni Battista Pinardi (1880-1962)
5. Maria Giuseppina Amalia Sofia Iaconis (1867-1916)

=== June 11, 2019 ===
1. Augustus Tolton (1854-1897)
2. Enzo Boschetti (1929-1993)
3. Felice Tantardini, PIME (1898-1991)
4. Giovanni Nadiani, SSS (1885-1940)
5. María Beatriz del Rosario Arroyo, OP (1884-1957)
6. Maria Paola Muzzeddu (1913-1971)
7. Santina Collani (1914-1956)

=== July 5, 2019 ===
1. Ángel Riesco Carbajo (1902-1972)
2. Elyās Buțros al-Ḩwayek (1843-1931)
3. Étienne-Pierre Morlanne (1772-1862)
4. Francisca Fuentes, OP (1647-1711)
5. Giovanni Ferro, CRS (1901-1992)
6. Vincenzo Lipani, OFMCap (1842-1920)
7. Władysław Korniłowicz (1884-1946)

=== October 2, 2019 ===
1. Augusto Cesare Bertazzoni (1876-1972)
2. Louis-Marie-Joseph Querbes (1793-1859)
3. María Natividad Sánchez Viloria OSC (1905-1991)

=== November 28, 2019 ===
1. Ana de Lobera Torres OCD (1545-1621) (beatified on 29 September 2024)
2. Georg Michael Wittmann (1760-1833)
3. Giacomo Bulgaro OFMConv (1879-1967)
4. Maria Antonia Solimani (1688-1758)
5. Olinto Fedi (1841-1923)
6. Ovide Charlebois OMI (1862-1933)

=== December 11, 2019 ===
1. Américo Monteiro de Aguiar (1887-1956)
2. Carlo Angelo Sonzini (1878-1957)
3. Dinah Amorim SchP (1917-1988)
4. Giulio Facibeni (1884-1958)
5. Tomás Suárez Fernández OSA (1915-1949)
6. Vincenzo Maria Morelli CR (1741-1812)

== 2020 ==
=== January 23, 2020 ===
1. Carmen Caterina Bieno OCD (1898-1966)
2. François-Léon Clergue OFMCap (1825-1907)
3. Giovanni Tavelli (1386-1446)
4. Joaquim Masmitjà de Puig (1808-1886)
5. José Antonio Plancarte y Labastida (1840-1898)
6. José Pio Gurruchaga Castuariense (1881-1967)

=== February 21, 2020 ===
1. Emilio Recchia CSS (1888-1969)
2. Emilio Venturini CO (1842-1905)
3. Mario Hiriart Pulido (1931-1964)
4. Pirro Scavizzi (1884-1964)

=== May 5, 2020 ===
1. Carmine De Palma (1876-1961) (beatified on 15 November 2025)
2. Francesco Caruso (1879-1951)
3. Francisco Barrecheguren Montagut CSsR (1881-1957)
4. Maria Concepción Barrecheguren García (1905-1927) (beatified on 6 May 2023)
5. Matteo Farina (1990-2009)

=== May 26, 2020 ===
1. Melchior-Marie-Joseph de Marion Brésillac (1813-1859)

=== June 19, 2020 ===
1. Gloria Esperanza Elizondo García (1908-1966)

=== July 10, 2020 ===
1. Angelo Bonetta (1948-1963)
2. Eusebio Francesco Chini SJ (1645-1711)
3. María Félix Torres (1907-2001)
4. Mariano José de Ibargüengoitia Zuloaga (1815-1888)

=== September 29, 2020 ===
1. Francisca Pascual Doménech (1833-1903)
2. María Dolores Segarra Gestoso (1921-1959)

=== October 27, 2020 ===
1. Celia Méndez y Delgado (1844-1908)
2. Roberto Giovanni CSS (1903-1994)

=== November 23, 2020 ===
1. Andrés Manjón y Manjón (1846-1923)
2. Alfonso Ugolini (1908-1999)
3. Clemenza Adelaide Cesira Ticchi (1887-1922)
4. Fiorina Cecchin SSGC (1877-1925) (beatified on 5 November 2022)
5. Fortunato Maria Farina (1881-1954)
6. Maria Carmela Giannetto (1902-1930)

=== December 21, 2020 ===
1. Antonio Seghezzi (1906-1945)
2. Antonio Vicente González Suárez (1817-1851)
3. Bernardino Piccinelli OSM (1905-1984)
4. Bernardo Antonini (1932-2002)
5. Ignác Stuchlý (1869-1953)
6. Rosella Stàltari (1951-1974)
7. Vasco de Quiroga (1470-1565)

== 2021 ==
=== January 21, 2021 ===
1. Adele Bonolis (1909-1980)
2. Elizabeth Prout (1820-1864)
3. Jérôme Lejeune (1926-1994)
4. Michele Arcangelo Maria Antonio Vinti (1893-1943)
5. Pasquale Canzii (1914-1930)
6. Ruggero Maria Caputo (1907-1980)
7. Santiago Masarnau Fernández (1805-1882)

=== February 20, 2021 ===
1. Albino Alves da Cunha e Silva (1882-1973)
2. Alessandra Ghilardi SdPIP (1931-1995)
3. Anna Clara Giovanna Baseggio OSA (1752-1829)
4. Elisa Giambelluca (1941-1986)
5. Ignatius Spencer CP (1799-1864)
6. Luigia Rosina Rondi SdPIP (1924-1995)
7. Teresa Belleri SdPIP (1936-1995)

=== March 17, 2021 ===
1. Anna Sorti SdPIP (1947-1995)
2. Celestina Ossoli SdPIP (1937-1995)
3. Clovis Veuthey OFMConv (1896-1974)
4. Cosme Muñoz Pérez (1573-1636)
5. Maria Rosa Zorza SdPIP (1944-1995)
6. Mercurio Maria Teresi (1742-1805)
7. Salvador Valera Parra (1816-1889) (beatified on 7 February 2026)

=== April 24, 2021 ===
1. Anfrosina Berardi (1920-1933)
2. Emanuele Stablum CFI (1895-1950)
3. Enrique Ernesto Shaw (1921-1962)
4. María de los Desamparados Portilla Crespo (1925-1996)
5. Pietro Marcellino Corradini (1658-1743)

=== May 22, 2021 ===
1. Anna Mezzacapo OCD (1914-1969)
2. Antonia Emma Lesino PFF (1897-1962)
3. Bálint Sándor (1904-1980)
4. Bernard Kryszkiewicz CP (1915-1945)
5. Felice Canelli (1880-1977)
6. Mariano Gazpio Ezcurra OAR (1899-1989)

=== June 19, 2021 ===
1. Aniela Róża Godecka (1861-1937)
2. María Aurelia Iglesias Fidalgo RMI (1899-1982)
3. Orsola Donati (1849-1935)
4. Severino Fabriani (1792-1849)
5. Robert Schuman (1886-1963)

=== August 30, 2021 ===
1. Enrichetta Beltrame Quattrocchi (1914-2012)
2. Maria Cristina Cella Mocellin (1969-1995)
3. Nicolò Cortese OFMConv (1907-1944)

=== October 13, 2021 ===
1. Diego Hernández González (1915-1976)
2. Elisa Martinez DML (1905-1991) (beatified on 25 June 2023)
3. Magdeleine Hutin (1898-1989)
4. Rocco Giocondo Pasquale Spoletini OFM (1870-1951)

=== November 25, 2021 ===
1. Antonio Bello (1905-1993)
2. Giorgio Guzzetta CO (1682-1756)
3. Juan San Pedro Ustárroz OCD (1564-1615)
4. Maria Domenica Bottani OMVI (1896-1970)
5. Natalina Bonardi (1864-1945)
6. Odette Vidal Cardoso (1930-1939)

=== December 13, 2021 ===
1. Andrés Garrido Perales OdeM (1663-1728)
2. Bernardo Sartori MCCJ (1897-1983)
3. Gaetano Antonio Vigevano OFMCap (1825-1859)
4. Ludwika Banaś CSFN (1896-1966)

== 2022 ==
=== January 20, 2022 ===
1. Francesco Saverio Toppi OFMCap (1925-2007)
2. Raffaella De Vincenti (1872-1936)
3. Teresa Borgarino DC (1880-1949)

=== February 18, 2022 ===
1. Aldo Brienza OCD (1923-1989)
2. Eduardo Francisco Pironio (1920-1998) (beatified on 16 December 2023)
3. Juana Méndez Romero (1937-1990)
4. Maria da Conceição Santos (1907-1981)

=== April 9, 2022 ===
1. Aurora Calvo Hernández Agero (1901-1933)
2. Costantino Mazzieri OFMConv (1889-1983)
3. Fulgenzio Elorza Legaristi CP (1899-1966)
4. Kazimiera Gruszczyńska (1848-1927)
5. Lucia Noiret (1832-1889)
6. Maria Aristea Ceccarelli Bernacchia (1883-1971)
7. Rozalia Celak (1901-1944)

=== May 21, 2022 ===
1. Alfredo Morganti OFM (1886-1969)
2. Clemente Recalcati OFMCap (1868-1913)
3. Janina Woynarowska (1923-1979)
4. José Torres Padilla (1811-1878) (beatified on 9 November 2024)
5. Luigi Sodo (1811-1895)
6. Mariana Allsopp González-Manrique (1854-1933)
7. Teofilo Camomot (1914-1988)

=== August 5, 2022 ===
1. Giovanni Giuseppe Bonzi OFMCap (1898-1969)
2. Jesús Antonio Gómez y Gómez (1895-1971)
3. Juan Sánchez Hernández (1902-1975)
4. Maria Celine Kannanaikal UMI (1931-1957)
5. Vítor Coelho de Almeida CSsR (1899-1987)

=== December 17, 2022 ===
1. Aleksander Woźny (1910-1983)
2. Alessia Antonia Guaini (1902-1994)
3. Ancilla Caterina Isacchi (1857-1934) (to be beatified on 10 October 2026)
4. Franz de Castro Holzwarth (1942-1981)
5. Giulia Bonifacio (1863-1926)
6. Ignacy Posadzy (1898-1984)
7. José Marcos Figueróa Umpierrez SJ (1865-1942)
8. Luisa Guidotti Mistrali (1932-1979)
9. Magdalena Aulina Saurina (1897-1956)
10. Margherita Diomira Crispi (1879-1974)
11. Martin Benedict OFMConv (1931-1986)
12. Matteo Ricci SJ (1552-1610)
13. Teresa Veronesi MIN (1870-1950)
14. Ugo De Blasi (1918-1982)

== 2023 ==
=== January 19, 2023 ===
1. Bertilla Antoniazzi (1944-1964)
2. Gaetano Francesco Mauro (1888-1969)
3. Giovanni Barra (1914-1975)
4. Maria Allegri (1651-1677)
5. Miguel Costa y Llobera (1854-1922)
6. Vicente López de Uralde Lazcano SM (1894-1990)

=== February 23, 2023 ===
1. Albertina Violi Zirondoli (1901-1972)
2. Aloísio Sebastião Boeing SCI (1913-2006)
3. Anna Teresa Caterina Lussana (1852-1935)
4. Francisca Ana María Alcover Morell (1912-1954)
5. Giulio Bocci OFMCap (1885-1974)

=== March 23, 2023 ===
1. Amelia Rossi SSHJM (1890-1945)
2. Carlo Crespi Croci SDB (1891-1982)
3. Elisa de Jesus Pereira HSC (1897-1963)
4. Florence Catherine Flanagan OSsS (1892-1941)
5. Maria Domenica Lazzeri (1815-1848)
6. Teresa Enríquez Alvarado de Cárdenas (1450-1529)

=== May 20, 2023 ===
1. Arnaldo Canepa (1882-1966)
2. Edda Maria Caterina Roda (1940-1996)
3. Guido Vidal França Schäffer (1974-2009)
4. Lorena D'Alessandro (1964-1981)
5. Maria Cristina Ogier (1955-1974)
6. Maria Luiza Rezende Marques OCD (1915-2005)
7. Pedro Díez Gil SchP (1913-1983)
8. Simon Mpeke (1906-1975)

=== June 22, 2023 ===
1. Antônio de Almeida Lustosa SDB (1886-1974)
2. Lúcia dos Santos OCD (1907-2005)
3. Elizabeth Lange (1794-1882)
4. Marco Pagani OFM (1526-1589)
5. Pia Cantalupa DC (1888-1983)

=== November 8, 2023 ===
1. Eleonora Foresti (1878-1953)
2. Eliswa Vakayil (1831-1913) (to be beatified on 8 November 2025)
3. Giuseppe Marrazzo RCJ (1917-1992)

=== December 14, 2023 ===
1. Enrico Beretta OFMCap (1916-2001)
2. Ernesto Guillermo Cofiño Ubico (1899-1991)
3. Francesca Lancellotti Zotta (1917-2008)

== 2024 ==
=== January 24, 2024 ===
1. Gianfranco Chiti OFMCap (1921-2004)
2. Hovhannes Zohrabian OFMCap (1881-1972)
3. Rosa Volpato EF (1918-1946)
4. Sebastià Gili Vives (1811-1894)

=== March 14, 2024 ===
1. Agata Maria Jacobucci SFAlc (1858-1939)
2. Angelina Pirini (1922-1940)
3. Geevarghese Thomas Panickerveetil (1882-1953)
4. Josip Tomičić OFMCap (1901-1981)
5. Libério Rodrigues Moreira (1884-1980)
6. Maria Maddalena Frescobaldi Capponi (1771-1839)
7. Rose Hawthorne Lathrop (1851-1926)

=== April 13, 2024 ===
1. Teresa Lanfranco (1920-1989)

=== May 23, 2024 ===
1. Enrico Medi (1911-1974)
2. Ismael Molinero Novillo (1917-1938)
3. Oscar Gattiani OFMCap (1914-1999)

=== June 20, 2024 ===
1. Ascensión Sacramento Sánchez y Sánchez (1911-1946)
2. Nicola Antonio Columbro OFM (1908-2004)
3. Palma Pasqua Zauli (1886-1954)
4. Vicenta Guilarte Alonso FI (1879-1960)

=== November 25, 2024 ===
1. Joseph Lang (1857-1924)

=== December 18, 2024 ===
1. Áron Márton (1896-1980)
2. Giuseppe Maria Leone (1829-1902)
3. Pietro Goursat (1914-1991)

== 2025 ==
=== January 27, 2025 ===
1. Luigia Sinapi (1916-1978)
2. Madaleina Catherine Beauchamp Hambrough OSsS (1887-1966)
3. Quintino Sicuro (1920-1968)

=== February 24, 2025 ===
1. Cunegonda Siwiec (1876-1955)
2. Didaco Bessi (1856-1919)
3. Emil Kapaun (1916-1951)
4. Michele Maura Montaner (1843-1915)
5. Salvo D'Acquisto (1920-1943)

=== March 28, 2025 ===
1. José Antônio de Maria Ibiapina (1806-1883)

=== April 14, 2025 ===
1. Antoni Gaudí (1852-1926)
2. Peter Joseph Triest (1760-1836)
3. Angelo Bughetti (1877-1935)
4. Agostino Cozzolino (1928-1988)

== See also ==
- List of people declared venerable by Pope John XXIII
- List of people declared venerable by Pope Paul VI
- List of people declared venerable by Pope John Paul II
- List of people declared venerable by Pope Benedict XVI
