= List of venerable people (Catholic) =

In the Catholic Church, venerable is a title used during a beatification process for a person whose life was found to be characterised by heroic virtue.

The following is an incomplete list of people declared to be venerable. The list is in alphabetical order by Christian name but, if necessary, by surname or the place or attribute part of the name.

Venerable	Year of death	Year declared venerable
Matthew Makil	1914	2025
Agnelo de Souza	1927	1986
Alessandro Luzzago	1602	1899
Alfred Pampalon	1896	1991
Alfredo Obviar	1978	2018
Aloísio Sebastião Boeing	2006	2023
Aloysius Schwartz	1992	2015
Alphonse Gallegos	1991	2016
Andrey Sheptytsky	1944	2015
Anfrosina Berardi	1920	2021
Angelo Angioni	1915	2008
Anne de Guigne	1922	1990
Anne de Xainctonge	1621	1900
Antoni Gaudí	1926	2025
Antonietta Meo	1937	2007
António Barroso	1918	2017
Antônio de Almeida Lustosa	1974	2023
Antônio Ferreira Viçoso	1875	2014
Áron Márton	1980	2024
August Hlond	1948	2018
Augustus Tolton	1897	2019
Aureliano of the Blessed Sacrament	1963	1999
Attilio Giordani	1972	2013
Benigna Victim of Jesus	1981	2022
Benoîte Rencurel	1718	2009
Bernard Łubieński	1933	2018
Bruno Lanteri	1830	1965
Caesar Baronius	1607	1745
Carla Ronci	1970	1997
Caroline-Barbe Colchen Carré de Malberg	1891	2014
Catherine McAuley	1841	1990
Clotilde of France	1802	1808
Cornelia Connelly	1879	1992
Damião de Bozzano	1997	2019
Delia Tetreault	1941	1997
Edel Quinn	1944	1994
Edward J. Flanagan	1948	2026
Eusebio Kino	1711	2020
Faustino Pérez-Manglano	1963	2011
Fathi Baladi	1980	2019
Francesca Lancellotti	2008	2023
Francesco Convertini	1868	2017
Francis Libermann	1852	1876
François Nguyễn Văn Thuận	2002	2017
Frederic Baraga	1868	2012
Geevarghese Mar Ivanios	1953	2024
Giacomo Gaglione	1962	2009
Gioacchino La Lomia	1905	2002
Gioacchino of the Queen of Peace	1890	1985
Giovanni Bacile	1941	2015
Giuseppe Carraro	1980	2015
Giuseppe Marchetti	1896	2016
Giuseppe Maria Leone	1902	2024
Guido Vidal França Schäffer	2009	2023
Henriette Delille	1862	2010
Hermínio Pinzetta	1972	2019
Ignacia del Espíritu Santo	1748	2007
Innocentto Leonelli	1625	before 1679
Isabel Larrañaga Ramírez	1899	1999
Jérôme Lejeune	1926	1994
Joaquina Maria Barcelo Pages	1940	2012
José Merino Andrés	1905	1968
Josefa Menéndez	1923	1948
Joseph Hartmann	1866	1998
Josip Lang	1924	2024
Kadalikkattil Mathai Kathanar	1935	2011
Leo Dupont	1876	1939
Léon-Gustave Dehon	1925	1997
Lúcia of Fátima	2005	2023
Luigi Maria Olivares	1943	2004
Louise of France	1787	1873
Margaret Anne Sinclair	1925	1978
Margherita Occhiena	1856	2006
María Evangelista Quintero Malfaz	1591	1648
Maria Kaupas	1940	2010
Maria Dulce Rodrigues dos Santos	1972	2014
María de Ágreda	1665	1673
Maria Güell	1921	1998
María Luisa Josefa	1937	2000
Marie de Sales Chappuis	1793	1875
Marthe Robin	1981	2014
Mary Potter	1913	1988
Mary Angeline Teresa McCrory	1994	2012
Mary Ward	1645	2009
Matt Talbot	1925	1975
Matteo Farina	2009	2020
Miquel Costa i Llobera	1922	2023
Nano Nagle	1784	2013
Nelson Baker	1936	2011
Odette Vidal Cardoso	1939	2021
Patrick Peyton	1992	2017
Pelágio Sauter	1961	2014
Pierre Goursat	1991	2024
Pierre Toussaint	1853	1996
Pietro Riminucci	1960	2008
Pope Pius XII	1958	2009
Rafaél Manuel Almansa Riaño	1840	1927
Rafael Cordero	1868	2013
Robert Schuman	1963	2021
Rose Hawthorne Lathrop	1926	2024
Rosalie Cadron-Jetté	1864	2013
Romano Bottegal	1978	2013
Rudolf Komórek	1949	1995
Samuel Charles Mazzuchelli	1864	1993
Satoko Kitahara	1958	2015
Serafina of God	1699	1723
Simon Srugi	1943	1993
Teofilo Camomot	1988	2022
Tereza Margarida of the Heart of Mary	2005	2023
Varghese Payyappilly Palakkappilly	1929	2018
Veronica of the Passion	1906	2014
Vital-Justin Grandin	1902	1966
Vítor Coelho de Almeida	1987	2022
Vittorio De Marino	1929	1992
Vincent Cimatti	1965	1991
Zacarias of Saint Teresa	1957	2014

== See also ==
- List of blesseds
- List of saints
- List of Servants of God
- List of venerated couples
