= Vicente Garrido Pastor =

Venerable Vicente Garrido Pastor
- Born: 12 November 1896; Benaguasil, Valencia, Spain
- Died: 16 April 1975 (aged 78); Valencia, Spain

Vicente Garrido Pastor (12 November 1896 - 16 April 1975) was a Spanish Roman Catholic priest and the founder of the Secular Institute of the Workers of the Cross. Garrido served as a parish priest and teacher before becoming the canon for the Valencia Cathedral where he often spent long hours listening to confessions. He was also a sought after spiritual director with priests and married couples going to see him for consultation. Garrido founded his order in 1934 with the aim of Christian sanctification for all people with a particular emphasis on the role of women in the Church.

The beatification process for Garrido opened in Valencia in 1989; on 14 June 2016 Pope Francis acknowledged his heroic virtue and named him as venerable.

== Life ==
Isidro Vicente was born on 12 November 1896 in Benaguasil in the Valencia province in Spain as the last of seven children to Isidro Garrido and Desamparados (or Amparo) Pastor.

In 1910 he commenced his ecclesial studies and later received his ordination to the priesthood] on 12 June 1921 in the metropolitan cathedral from Enrique Reig y Casanova. He served as a vicar first in Benimassot and later served for a few months as the coadjutor vicar for Albaida all spanning between 1922 and 1936 when the Spanish Civil War broke out. Garrido obtained a doctorate for his theological studies from the Universidad Pontificia de Valencia in 1922 and afterwards began teaching seminarians as a professor for both religious and philosophical studies. He was also an active promoter of women in the life of the Church and sought to help expand their role in the church's mission.

Garrido became a canon in 1956 for the metropolitan cathedral. The Archbishop of Valencia, José María García Lahiguera, expressed his admiration and respect for Garrido and noted that he was a good listener and was also an encouraging spiritual director who valued the spiritual growth of his people. Garrido had also been organizing the Spiritual Exercises of Ignatius of Loyola following the conclusion of the Spanish Civil War. Garrido once helped prepare some girls for their First Communion and asked if some of them were willing to dedicate themselves to God in their lives. Garrido was surprised when one girl, María Francisca Ricart Olmos, raised her hand and replied that she would do so (she became a Servite sister which was killed during the Spanish Civil War).

Garrido founded the Secular Institute of the Workers of the Cross on 13 June 1934; it received diocesan approval on 21 October 1964 from Archbishop Marcelino Olaechea and then the papal decree of praise from Pope Paul VI on 12 June 1971.

He suffered from a painful illness a month before his death on 16 April 1975 and Archbishop Lahiguera celebrated his funeral with 100 priests in attendance. His remains are now housed in the Capilla de la Santa Cruz in Moncada in Valencia.

== Beatification process ==
The beatification process was launched on 28 February 1989 after the Congregation for the Causes of Saints titled Garrido as a Servant of God after having issued the official nihil obstat edict for the cause to begin. The Archbishop of Valencia Miguel Roca Cabanellas inaugurated the diocesan process on 12 June 1990 which Cardinal Agustín García-Gasco Vicente closed on 14 September 1999. The Congregation declared the process valid in a decree issued on 20 October 2000 and received the positio for additional assessment. Garrido became titled as venerable on 14 June 2016 after Pope Francis confirmed that the late priest had lived a life of heroic virtue.

A possible miracle due to Garrido's invocation was investigated in Valencia from 2012 to 2013 and the Congregtaoin validated that diocesan investigation on 9 May 2014. The postulator of the cause is Silvia Mónica Correale.
