= Doroteo Hernández Vera =

Spanish Roman Catholic priest

Venerable Doroteo Hernández Vera
- Born: 28 March 1901; Almazán, Soria, Spain
- Died: 6 November 1991 (aged 90); Coslada, Madrid, Spain
- Venerated in: Roman Catholic Church
- Attributes: Priest's cassock
- Patronage: Cruzada Evangélica

Doroteo Hernández Vera (28 March 1901 - 6 November 1991) was a Spanish Roman Catholic priest and the founder of the secular institute Cruzada Evangélica. He served as a chaplain following his ordination and celebrated clandestine Masses and other services during the Spanish Civil War leading to his arrest. It was during his imprisonment that he saw the need to better evangelize to bring the Gospel message to those that either rejected or did not know about God while also seeing it as his objective to minister in prisons. He did this in the time after his release from prison until near the end of his life when he retired upon the significant decline of his health.

The steps to initiate his beatification cause started in the 1990s soon after he had died but the cause launched in 2001 therefore enabling for him to be titled as a Servant of God. He became titled as Venerable on 21 December 2018 after Pope Francis recognized that Hernández had practiced heroic virtue during his lifetime.

== Life ==
Doroteo Hernández Vera was born on 28 March 1901 in Matute de Almazán to poor parents Santiago Hernández and Juana Vera. He was baptized on 29 March in the Assumption parish and it was done in haste because it had been feared that he had been born almost half-dead therefore was in danger of a premature death.

From the age of four he felt called to enter into the priesthood and in 1915 commenced his ecclesial studies in Sigüenza that ended in 1925. He received his sacerdotal ordination to the priesthood on 20 March 1926 in Tarazona from Bishop Isidro Badía Sarradell (he celebrated his first Mass on 26 March) and then commenced his pastoral activities in Soria; he served first as a chaplain for the Sacred Heart College but would serve as a chaplain for most of his ecclesial life.

Hernández was arrested on 14 April 1937 following the outbreak of the Spanish Civil War (he was conducting clandestine Masses and other services during this period for the faithful) but was released from prison that following 26 August; it was during that time that he realized his purpose was to minister to prisoners but to find methods of better evangelizing the message of the Gospel to the faithful and to those that either rejected or did not know about God. Following his release he started to assist prisoners condemned to death since his imprisonment left a lasting impression on what his duties as a priest meant.

He started a small group of working-class women dedicated to evangelization but conserving their secular state as opposed to making them part of a religious congregation. He founded the secular institute Cruzada Evangélica in Santander on 8 December 1937 and it became a pious association in 1938 after the Bishop José María Eguino Trecu approved its founding. But in 1942 the bishop forced them to become a formal religious congregation (in contradiction of the institute's original intent and mission) since secular institutes had no legal ecclesial form until Pope Pius XII formalized them in 1947 in his apostolic constitution Provida Mater Ecclesia. The institute later received formal diocesan approval in Santander on 18 May 1951 and received formal papal approval over two decades after from Pope Paul VI on 8 December 1976.

In 1942 fire spread in Santander resulting in people losing their homes and schools being burnt down. This also left a great number of people living on the streets prompting Hernández to begin efforts to see the construction of two new schools for the children. He also began collaborating with Catholic Action in Santander around this stage.

Hernández died on 6 November 1991 in Madrid following a long and painful illness (he suffered from cerebral atherosclerosis that affected both swallowing and his speech); his institute has since spread across the world to places such as Bolivia and Zambia.

== Beatification process ==
The institute's General Council in Madrid in their meeting held on 18 December 1999 decided to lodge a formal request for the cause for the late priest's beatification to be introduced. The official request was made to the Bishop of Alcalá de Henares Jesús Esteban Catalá Ibáñez who then approved the appointment of the Dominican priest Crescencio Palomo Iglesias to be the first postulator for the cause on 8 February 2000. The cause was launched on 2 January 2001 after the Congregation for the Causes of Saints issued the official "nihil obstat" (no objections) decree thus issuing their assent to the cause being opened and titling Hernández as a Servant of God. The diocesan investigation into his life and reputation for holiness (as well as gathering his spiritual writings) took place from 3 February 2001 until 12 June 2004 with the evidence being sent to the C.C.S. in Rome. The C.C.S. validated the diocesan phase on 30 November 2006 after determining that the tribunal adhered to the C.C.S. regulations for conducting causes. The Dominican priest Vito Tomás Gómez was appointed as the postulator at this stage.

On 21 November 2016 the postulation submitted the official Positio dossier to the C.C.S. Cardinal Prefect Angelo Amato so that the C.C.S. could investigate the cause further. Theologians approved the cause after assessing the dossier as did the C.C.S. cardinal and bishop members sometime following this. Hernánzez became titled as Venerable on 21 December 2018 after Pope Francis confirmed that the late priest practiced heroic virtue during his lifetime.

The postulator for this cause since 2016 is Maria Sowa (a member of the secular institute).
