= Uberto Mori =

Italian layman and entrepreneur

Venerable Uberto Mori TOSF
- Born: 28 January 1926; Modena, Kingdom of Italy
- Died: 6 September 1989 (aged 63); Pavia, Italy

Uberto Mori (28 January 1926 – 6 September 1989) was an Italian layman who served as a lecturer in Bologna and was also an entrepreneur. Mori was also a member of the Third Order of Saint Francis and was known for his simple lifestyle, the purity in which he lived it, and his veneration of Mary. Mori was declared venerable in 2014 after Pope Francis recognized that he had lived a life of heroic virtue.

== Life ==
Uberto Mori was born in 1926 in Modena to Mario Mori and Edmea Scabazzi. His father was an artillery officer. Due to his several posts across the nation Uberto studied in schools in cities such as Florence and Trieste.

In 1943 General Mori fell ill with stomach cancer and it fell to Uberto to serve instead. He was seventeen when he was assigned to Nonantola and then to Pavia. It was at this time that he managed to warn 107 Jewish children to flee the area before the advancing Nazis arrived. In Nonantola, Lieutenant Uberto helped to hide them in the seminary and in private homes shortly before the arrival of the Germans, thus saving them from deportation. Seventy-three were able to get to safety in Switzerland.

His father died on 13 August 1944. Uberto was exempted from further duties and took the chance to resume his studies. But partisans soon broke into his home to intimidate him. He was almost shot but managed to escape his attackers and hid in Modena. After 1944 he pursued educational interests in Bologna while he worked in ceramics in Formigine.

Mori married Gilda Cavedoni on 14 April 1952 and went on to have three children. The eldest child was Mario (b. 1953) and the second was their daughter Maria Teresa (b. 1955). Their next son was due in 1958 but Gilda suffered a miscarriage. In 1961 their final child Maria Manuela was born but she died after a mere thirteen months after birth due to a severe illness.

He graduated on 23 July 1959 with a degree in industrial engineering with honors and became an assistant and later a lecturer in Bologna. He became a professor in the Department of Chemistry and Technology. His entrepreneurial abilities allowed him to establish an institution in 1960 known as the Studio Tecnico Uberto Mori that aimed to improve ceramics. He also established – in 1968 – the Ovens Industrial Plants and another in 1971. To do this he traveled to the United States of America in order to purchase the patent for the things that he would use for his establishment. He developed a new type of firing ceramics that increased productivity and reduced costs. The success of this business garnered wealth for Mori. It also convinced him that his sole aim was to praise the Lord in all circumstances.

Mori and his wife embarked on a pilgrimage to Lourdes in 1963. They became a members of the Third Order of Saint Francis on 19 February 1967. Mori became involved in activities at the Sanctuary of the Blessed Virgin of Health of Puianello and took biblical and Mariological courses there. He grew in his devotion to the Blessed Virgin Mary. He supported hospitals and also established a hostel for Franciscan tertiaries. His spiritual advisor was the Capuchin Servant of God Raffaele Spallanzani who died in 1972.

In 1978 he obtained a Diploma in Theology. He later established the Mori Group in 1980 and the broadcaster Antenna Uno so that he could evangelize on air. In 1985 he joined the Christian Union of Entrepreneurs and Managers (UCID) and, in 1986, the Association of Hospital Volunteers (AVO).

It was during a broadcast on 7 April 1987 that he suffered a heart attack. The result of this was that he was left crippled. Despite this he found that the Gospel and the rosary strengthened him during his suffering. Uberto Mori died during an open-heart operation in Pavia on 6 September 1989.

== Beatification process ==
The beatification process that spanned from 6 December 1997 to 29 June 2000 conferred upon him the title of Servant of God. The process was ratified in 2002. The Positio – which documented his life of heroic virtue – was submitted in 2003 to the Congregation for the Causes of Saints in Rome for further evaluation. Pope Francis approved his life of heroic virtue and proclaimed him to be venerable on 12 June 2014. The miracle required for his beatification was investigated and ratified on 18 April 2008.
