= Giovanni Bacile =

Venerable Giovanni Bacile
- Born: 12 August 1880; Bisacquino, Palermo, Kingdom of Italy
- Died: 20 August 1941 (aged 61); Bisacquino, Palermo

Giovanni Bacile (12 August 1880 – 20 August 1941) was an Italian Roman Catholic priest who exercised his pastoral service in the Diocese of Monreale. Pope Francis recognized that Bacilee lived a life of heroic virtue and declared him to be venerable.

== Life ==
Giovanni Bacile was born on 12 August 1880 and baptized on 13 August. He lost his father at the age of eight and he was a shoemaker and later a waiter in order to provide for his mother and siblings. Bacile attended church services on frequent occasions as a child and he wished to become a priest. At the age of sixteen he commenced his studies in Monreale and was ordained to priesthood on 17 June 1905. He was made archpriest of Bisacquino in 1916.

Bacile was a driving force in his diocese for the people listened to him preach and his talks in which the people realized he was a man of God who stressed the importance of His love. He helped the poor and the sick during his pastoral work. Bacile stressed the importance of the Eucharist and the participation in the Mass and his life was oriented towards the presence of Jesus Christ in the Eucharist. Bacile died in 1941 and there were people who flocked to his tomb for his intercession.

== Beatification process ==
The formal cause for beatification commenced in 1989 which bestowed upon Bacile the title of Servant of God. The process commenced on a local level in Monreale and the process was soon ratified in 1995. The Congregation for the Causes of Saints received the documentation on his life of heroic virtue, the positio, in 2003 but didn't begin to evaluate the cause until 2013. Pope Francis approved the cause and proclaimed Bacile to be Venerable on 3 February 2015.

== See also ==
- Catholic Church in Italy
- List of venerable people (Roman Catholic)
