= Giovanni Folci =

Italian Roman Catholic priest

Priest
- Born: 24 February 1890; Cagno, Como, Kingdom of Italy
- Died: 31 March 1963 (aged 73); Valle di Colorina, Sondrio, Italy
- Venerated in: Roman Catholic Church
- Patronage: Sisters Handmaids of Jesus Crucified

Giovanni Folci (24 February 1890 - 31 March 1963) was an Italian Roman Catholic priest and the founder of the Sisters Handmaids of Jesus Crucified. Folci began his ecclesial studies after he turned ten and was called to serve as a chaplain to Italian soldiers on the frontlines during the course of World War I until his capture and release. His main priorities as a priest included tending to the ill and poor and also focused on the education of children while seeking to establish a religious congregation that would continue that work.

Folci's beatification process launched in 2003 and he became titled as a Servant of God as the investigation was opened in his native Como. The investigation culminated on 30 September 2015 after Pope Francis confirmed his life of heroic virtue and named him as Venerable.

== Life ==
=== Education and priesthood ===
Giovanni Folci was born in Como on 24 February 1890 as one of four children to the devout Carlo Folci and Teresa Sonzini. His father was a store manager and also owned a tavern adjoining the store. He was baptized on 27 February in the San Michele parish church. His two brothers were Giuseppe and Giacomo and his sister was Carolina.

Folci began to serve as an altar server in 1897 and in the summer months lived with his maternal grandmother in Malnate where he also got to know his uncle (now a Servant of God) Carlo Sonzini who was a seminarian in Milan. The relationship he forged with his uncle fostered within Folci the call to enter the priesthood. His uncle soon suggested to his parents that he be sent to Vendrogno to complete his studies where his academic results were so good that he was permitted to skip the fifth grade. In summer 1901 he attended the ordination of his uncle and sometime after that towards summer's end arrived in Como to commence his own studies for the priesthood. But in 1904 he developed a lung disease and was sent to Valduce to be treated. He returned to his studies once he recovered and passed his examinations in 1909.

He was made a deacon on 6 January 1913. Folci was ordained to the priesthood in Como on 13 July 1913 and he celebrated his first Mass on 14 July in the Santuario del Crocifisso in Como with his uncle at his side. On 20 July he celebrated Mass in his parish of origin in his hometown. In August 1913 the Bishop of Como appointed him as the parish priest for Valle di Colorina and sent him there instead of to upper Valmalenco as was predicted for him. He arrived with his mother for the first time in Valle di Colorina on 23 August with the stationmaster welcoming him at the station.

=== Chaplain and imprisonment ===
But the outbreak of World War I in Europe saw him summoned to the frontlines that August as a chaplain in which he was later decorated for his actions. He was appointed as a chaplain for the soldiers at the end of September and served in that role until May 1916 when he was permitted a period of rest; he resumed his activities in October. Folci and several others were later taken as prisoners in November 1917 following the defeat of Caporetto and then interned in concentration camps across German regions until 1919 once the Red Cross arrived to oversee prisoner release following the war's end. It was during his time in prison that he tended to his fellow prisoners. He was first held in detention in Rastatt in Baden-Württemberg and received permission to celebrate Mass for himself and his fellow prisoners.

In September 1918 he was sent to a hospital near Limburg to tend to German soldiers and decided upon the armistice in 1918 not to leave the hospital. He left just over a month later in January 1919 and passed through Rome where he met with Pope Benedict XV who encouraged his idea to erect a monument to the fallen and victimized of the war.

=== Projects ===
Upon his return to his parish in July 1919 he had the desire to commemorate the imprisoned and the fallen which his parishioners supported. To that end he decided to erect the Santuario del Prigioniero dedicated to the Blessed Sacrament in his parish to honor those fallen; this project was completed and was consecrated on 27 September 1925. In December 1925 he rested following a period of exhaustion. He later founded - next to that place - his religious congregation known as the Sisters Handmaids of Jesus Crucified on 29 November 1926 alongside several religious and priests. This order took several forms during his lifetime. In 1919 he founded a center for the education of children and at a later stage founded the Et in Terra Pax home for retreats for priests and others.

He later bought at Santa Caterina di Valfurva an old hotel which he converted into a Casa Alpina for pre-seminarians and another at Villa di Santa Croce in Como which also acted as a retirement home for older priests. In 1950 he opened a home for the Spiritual Exercises and the Casa Gesù for the care of ill priests in Loano. It was also in 1950 that he travelled to Rome to celebrate the proclamation of the dogma of the Assumption of the Mother of God. Folci was successful in 1956 with the establishment of the San Pio X Pre-Seminario within the Vatican state which received approval from Pope Pius XII and was a venture that Monsignor Domenico Tardini also supported. Federico Tedeschini - the archpriest for the Vatican - also agreed with Folci's proposal. He and the students of the San Pio X Pre-Seminario met with Pius XII in Castel Gandolfo on 2 October 1952.

He was present on 5 February 1957 at the bedside of his uncle (who was made a Monsignor in 1942) who died not long after Folci arrived. On 23 February 1960 he was appointed as the rector for the Santuario della Madonna del Soccorso in Ossuccio and was hospitalized in Milan in 1960 after experiencing heart problems while in Albenga.

=== Death ===
On 30 March 1963 he returned from Loano to his parish after having passed through Como. He was found dead on the floor in his room on 31 March after the religious of his order waited for his presence to celebrate Mass. Folci's remains are interred (since October 1963) in the Santuario di Valle di Colorina in the main chapel beneath the main altar. His resting place is marked with a bronze monument that depicts a priest rendering assistance to a soldier.

== Beatification process ==
The beatification process launched on 7 July 2003 under Pope John Paul II and he was titled as a Servant of God after the Congregation for the Causes of Saints (CCS) published the "nihil obstat" (no objections) decree that allowed for the cause's launch. The Bishop of Como inaugurated the diocesan investigation for the cause on 15 September 2004 and closed it in Como on 19 November 2005; the CCS validated this process in Rome on 24 February 2007.

The postulation then drafted and compiled the positio dossier that collated witness testimonies and gathered documentation accumulated from the diocesan process; this dossier was submitted to the CCS on 16 February 2013. The dossier received approval from theologians on 3 June 2014 and from the CCS members on 22 September 2015. He was declared to be Venerable the following 30 September after Pope Francis confirmed his life of heroic virtue.

The current postulator for this cause is Dr. Francesca Consolini.
