= Francesco Gattola =

Italian Roman Catholic priest

Venerable Francesco Gattola

Priest
- Born: 19 September 1822; Naples, Kingdom of Naples
- Died: 20 January 1899 (aged 76); Naples, Kingdom of Italy
- Venerated in: Roman Catholic Church
- Attributes: Priest's cassock; Zucchetto

Francesco Gattola (19 September 1822 – 20 January 1899) was an Italian Roman Catholic priest who lived and served in Naples. He was the founder of the Daughters of the Most Holy Immaculate Virgin of Lourdes.

In 2015, Pope Francis recognized his life of heroic virtue and declared the late priest to be Venerable. A miracle that is needed for his beatification is now under investigation.

== Life ==
Francesco Gattola was born in Naples on 19 September 1822.

He was ordained to the priesthood in 1846 and was known for his virtuous conduct throughout his pastoral mission. He founded the Daughters of the Most Holy Immaculate Virgin of Lourdes in 1873; the order devoted its attention to the neediest and poorest while promoting Marian principles.

He died in 1899.

== Beatification process ==
The official cause for beatification commenced in Naples on 20 June 2001 and granted him the title of Servant of God. The diocesan process went from 2002 to 2003 and was ratified in 2004. The Positio was sent to the Congregation for the Causes of Saints in Rome in 2011 and it resulted in Pope Francis proclaiming him to be Venerable on 18 March 2015 on the account of his life of heroic virtue.

A miracle attributed to him was investigated on a local process and was ratified on 19 November 2010.
