= Elisabetta Tasca Serena =

Venerable Elisabetta Tasca Serena
- Born: 24 April 1899; San Zenone degli Ezzelini, Treviso, Kingdom of Italy
- Died: 3 November 1978 (aged 79); Vò di Brendola, Vicenza, Italy

Elisabetta Tasca Serena (24 April 1899 – 3 November 1978) was an Italian Roman Catholic laywoman. Tasca was devout in her childhood since her religious upbringing came from her parents; this was something that she would later pass on to her own children. In 1921 she was married and she and her husband had twelve children with four of them entering the religious life. Tasca was tireless in caring for her ill husband before his death and after that dedicated herself to involvement in her parish and in tending to her children and grandchildren.

Tasca's cause for beatification launched in 1991 and she became titled as a Servant of God but later was named as venerable in late 2014 after Pope Francis confirmed that she had lived a life of heroic virtue.

== Life ==
Elisabetta Tasca was born at dawn on 24 April 1899 in San Zenone degli Ezzelini as the last of seven children to the modest peasants Angelo Tasca and Luigia Battaglia; she received her baptism just after she was born from Father Vitale Gallina. Her siblings (in order) were: Fausto, Emilia, Antonio, Lino, Erminia and Luigi. Her brother Lino died when he was eight, and when she turned eight, her mother was struck with facial paralysis in 1907.

Her parents were devout and fostered a devotion to the Cross which was a devotion that she herself would learn from them. Tasca was a sociable child who was attentive to the needs of others: in one case she would bring lunch to her brother Antonio who worked on the construction of the local church. Her brother complained that the food was too little for him and so she returned home to her mother to give her lunch so the two could eat together. But she would give him her lunch instead rather than eating herself. Each morning she would attend Mass and would then return home in order to help her mother with the housework.

Tasca received her Confirmation on 26 January 1908 from the Blessed Bishop of Treviso Giacinto Longhin. Her father was a serious but jovial man but Tasca noted how pained he was when his sons had to go to the frontlines during World War I; her father would often walk around reciting rosaries for his sons.

Her future husband Giuseppe Serena (b. 1891) served in the VI Bersaglieri di Brescia during World War I and he was a serious but generous individual. But she was not too interested with his attempts to court her and with politeness would turn him down. But he was persistent and sought advice from his priest who spoke with Tasca. But she was still unsure if she wanted to pursue a relationship with him and so decided to visit the Santuario della Madonna del Monte to contemplate the matter further. It was here that she decided to get involved with him and it would lead to the pair getting married on 6 April 1921 (which Father Carlo Bernardi officiated over). The couple celebrated their honeymoon in Venice. It was not long after her wedding in 1921 that she first met Saint Leopold Mandić who would become her confessor and spiritual director.

The Serenas had twelve children (such as Pia etc.): two died as infants and four entered the religious life. Their first child would be born on 28 January 1922 and their last child Benito would be born on 14 April 1940. Tasca dedicated herself to caring for her husband after he fell ill and would tend to him until he died on 19 February 1967. In 1966 her son Benito married Rita Bisognin leading Tasca's sons Galileo and Antonio helping build a home for him which the Serenas were able to gift Benito with on 15 August 1966. It was around that time that her Passionist son Gabriele celebrated his first Mass.

The technological advances of the times saw neighbors start to purchase television sets for their homes. Tasca would set out her own so-called "TV channels" for a practical life:

- Go to the first Mass
- Recite the rosary
- Make the stockings and mend the clothes
- Work in the stall
- Teach the lessons to the children and prepare for school
- Prepare the food
- Do the laundry, dry, and fold it
- Sing for joy
- Wish everyone well
- So many jobs to do, and never idleness for a moment

Tasca attended her final Mass before her illness on 1 October 1978. Tasca fell ill on 2 October and the doctor was summoned. The doctor diagnosed Tasca as having contracted bronchopneumonia. Her condition worsened in the morning on 7 October which led her being rushed to the Montecchio hospital. On 23 November in the night she suffered from pain in the liver and intestines leading doctors to believe she had gallstones and bowel obstruction. On 25 October her pain worsened and she had her daughter Sister Elisalma at her side. On 30 October she was able to leave hospital and was pleased to be home. Her two sons Antonio and Noè came from Canada at this point to be with their ailing mother. On 31 October she made her confession and received the Extreme Unction from her priest son Galileo. On 1 November on her deathbed she asked for a Mass to be celebrated there in order to thank God for four of her children having entered the religious life (two became nuns and two became Passionist priests). Tasca also asked her children to sing the Te Deum after she died. On 2 November her condition became aggravated and Tasca died on 3 November after she received the Eucharist. Her funeral was celebrated in the afternoon on 5 November with 27 priests in attendance; her remains were exhumed on 12 November 1997 and reinterred on 13 November in the chapel adjacent the Passionist church in her hometown.

== Beatification process ==
The beatification process was launched on 9 December 1991 after the Congregation for the Causes of Saints issued the nihil obstat ("no objections") decree and titled Tasca as a Servant of God. The diocesan investigation was conducted in Vicenza from 7 March until 23 November 1992 at which point documentation was sent to the Congregation for further investigation; the Congregation validated the process on 1 October 1993 as having complied with their regulations.

The postulation submitted the positio in 1994. Tasca became titled as venerable on 6 December 2014 after Pope Francis confirmed that she had lived a life of heroic virtue. The postulator for this cause is the Passionist priest Cristiano Massimo Parisi.
