= Alessandro Nottegar =

Venerable Alessandro Nottegar
- Born: 30 October 1943; Verona, Kingdom of Italy
- Died: 19 September 1986 (aged 42); Verona, Italy

Alessandro Nottegar (30 October 1943 - 19 September 1986) was an Italian Roman Catholic physician and the founder of the Comunità Regina Pacis. He studied medicine in the 1970s and after his marriage and graduation left for Brazil in 1978 to work in the missions as a doctor. He tended to ill children and also to the lepers before being forced to return to Verona in 1982 after one of his daughters fell ill with malaria. He sought work there in a hospital where he remained until his death; just a month before he died he established the Comunità Regina Pacis in the hills.

The beatification process for Nottegar launched in the 2000s and he became a Servant of God. The cause reached a decisive point in mid-2017 after Pope Francis confirmed Nottegar lived a life of heroic virtue thus allowing for him to be titled as venerable.

== Life ==
Alessandro Nottegar was born in Verona on 30 October 1943 as the ninth of ten children to devout parents; one sibling was Teresa. His father sent him to a friar-run boarding school in the hopes that he would become a priest. Following high school he began theological studies but decided he did want to pursue the religious life or the priesthood. He instead decided to do medicine and so began a medical course at the college in Verona before he married Luisa Scipionato on 27 February 1971. The pair together had three children.

Nottegar graduated in 1977 and then in 1978 relocated with his wife and children to Brazil for experience in the missions there. He was one of the first doctors to have arrived in the missions to lend their medical expertise and tended to ill children. The arrival of more doctors over time in the area allowed for him to move to Rodonia in the Amazon rainforest area where he began working to help the lepers. The Bishop of Rio Branco Moacyr Grechi not long after asked him to move to a small village in an area where there was no doctor at all and he set himself on tending to the medical needs of the population there. Nottegar also taught the people there how to prepare some medicines on their own. But Nottegar was forced to return to Verona in 1982 after his daughter Chiara contracted malaria (added to his daughters' desire to see their grandparents again) where he found work in a lab in the Saint Bonifacio hospital. Nottegar also sold the lands inherited from his father before depositing the funds into a checking account thus later allowing him to purchase a large house in the Veronese hills. He later founded the Comunità Regina Pacis in the hills on 15 August 1986 and it would later spread to have seven communities in places like Grezzana and Budapest.

Nottegar was returning home from the hospital in the afternoon on 19 September 1986 after he suffered a heart attack]and so was rushed to hospital. His wife was taken to the hospital where the doctor handed her his personal effects (his glasses as well as his watch and wedding ring) just as his daughter Chiara arrived. His funeral saw 28 priests concelebrate the Mass. His remains are housed in his group's motherhouse in Verona.

== Beatification process ==
The beatification process launched on 22 February 2007 after the Congregation for the Causes of Saints issued the nihil obstat ("no objections"), thus providing their assent to the cause being opened and titling Nottegar as a Servant of God. The diocesan process opened in Verona on 14 May 2007 and concluded later on 6 June 2009 after a period of gathering evidence that could attest to Nottegar's reputation for holiness (writings or other documentation as well as witness interrogatories). The Congregation later validated the diocesan investigation in Rome on 23 April 2010 after confirming it adhered to their guidelines for conducting causes.

The postulation drafted and submitted the positio to the Congregation in Rome on 21 November 2013. Nottegar became titled as venerable on 4 May 2017 after Pope Francis confirmed that Nottegar had practiced heroic virtue during his lifetime.
