= Luigi Rocchi =

Italian Roman Catholic

Venerable Luigi Rocchi
- Born: 19 February 1932; San Giovanni Addolorata Hospital, Rome, Kingdom of Italy
- Died: 26 March 1979 (aged 47); Ospedale Generale Provincale, Macerata, Italy

Luigi Rocchi (19 February 1932 – 26 March 1979) was an Italian Roman Catholic who was disabled for most of his life and was sometimes referred to as a "saint in a wheelchair". Rocchi exhibited signs of weakness in his limbs since his childhood but was not diagnosed until he was eight with Duchenne muscular dystrophy that led to a progressive muscular decline. He struggled with his condition at first but a religious experience in his adolescence seemed to restore him from his struggles and a commitment to preach the Gospel message to all while using his own suffering to demonstrate the need for people to love more. Rocchi made pilgrimages to Lourdes and to Loreto where he came to know and correspond with its prelate Loris Francesco Capovilla. He was also close with several other priests and figures such as the journalist (and later politician) Ettore Masina and his diocesan bishop (later cardinal) Ersilio Tonini.

The process for his beatification commenced in the 1990s in smaller steps that were undertaken in his diocese since 1991 to launch a formal cause. This formal activation came in 1992 and Rocchi became titled a Servant of God. On 3 April 2014, Pope Francis signed a decree that named Rocchi as Venerable upon confirming that Rocchi had lived a life practicing heroic virtue.

== Life ==
=== Childhood ===
Luigi Rocchi was born on 19 February 1932 in the San Giovanni Addolorata Hospital in Rome as the first of three children to Francesco Rocchi (13.12.1906–30.7.1991) and Maria Pascucci (20.5.1910–???). His first home was in Via Assisi 29 in the Ognissanti parish where he received his baptism on 17 April 1932 from the parish priest Father Angelo Michaele Cominola in the names of "Luigi Pacifico Carlo". His grandmother relocated to Rome from Tolentino in order to help raise him. His paternal grandparents were Lorenzo Rocchi and Maria Pascolini and his maternal grandparents were Nazareno Pascucci and Augusta Pelliccioni. His father was born in Caldarola in the Macerata province and was married to Rocchi's mother on 30 November 1929. His siblings were Gabriella (b. 3 September 1938) and Alba (b. 26 May 1946).

The Rocchi's – when he was two in 1934 – relocated to the industrial Tolentino area in the Macerata province where it was hoped that his father could find new work since his previous work at La Marchigiana failed resulting in workers out of a job. His father found work in Tolentino in the paper mill that Vincenzo Porcelli managed and worked there for over five decades before retiring (which he found difficult to adjust to). The Rocchi's lived first in a suburban area in an apartment and then in the central district close to the cathedral. In his small house in the Tolentino neighborhood he could see the church of Santa Maria Nuova out of one of the small windows. His mother (who was devout) was responsible for his religious upbringing and he valued this later in life as he would later write about; she would call him "Luigino" with affection. His maternal grandmother also helped to raise him in his childhood; he would later recall her often giving him pine nuts or dried figs from her apron pockets.

Rocchi first demonstrated signs of muscular decline in 1936 and this became pronounced at his First Communion when his mother had to help him to the balustrade. In 1940 he was diagnosed with having a disease (D.M.D.) that would lead to progressive muscular decline that impeded motor and muscular functions. He had been sent first to the children's hospital in Ancona before being sent to Bologna where the diagnosis was made. He had to use a cane (and later two) in order to move and at fifteen he was using one when he fell from a flight of stairs. He was unharmed though attributed his fortune to "the intervention of the Madonna" as he told his mother who helped him.

=== Education ===
Rocchi entered into a state school in Tolentino in the Piazza Sant'Agnese (now the Piazza Don Bosco) and at that time the Fascist regime under Benito Mussolini mandated that all public school students be enrolled in the Gioventù Italiana del Littorio. This included Rocchi around 1942 even though he had no particular liking for Fascism. He was an Introverted student and marginalized due to his being unable to do sports or things that the other students could do. He was noted for his discretion in language but was known to joke with others on occasion. He also attended catechism classes and his parish priest Primo Minnoni considered him among the best of his students with a particular flair for communication.

He made his first confession in the week leading to the reception of his First Communion and then attended a retreat in order to prepare for the latter event. He made his First Communion on 8 September 1941. He completed school in June 1944 before making an effort to seek work and so tried tailoring. His health prevented him from holding an iron or using a sewing needle so he was forced to abandon this. He enrolled in middle school in 1947 in Tolentino and during this time was exempted from sports due to his condition and studied French as a foreign language class. Rocchi also fell often at school so much so that the dean had written a letter to his mother in 1951 asking that he be kept at home in order to prevent further accidents in what ended Rocchi's schooling. He tried to enroll in two other schools but was rejected on the account of his condition. His passion for reading books of all sorts enabled him to home-school himself and he read books on the natural sciences as well as genetics among other subjects.

He suffered a setback in 1944 during a fire caused in an aerial bombardment towards the end of World War II that saw him too close to the blast zone which left him bald for the remainder of his life. He had been visiting the Rizzoli Hospital in Bologna at the time. In his adolescence he came into contact with members of the Catholic Action movement and later was registered to it alongside some few friends in the Oratorio di San Catervo. He also made pilgrimages often to Lourdes and Loreto due to his strong devotion to the Blessed Mother.

=== Religious experience ===
Rocchi also recalled a specific incident when he found an old broken crucifix that he fixed and cleaned and then Varnished with wood oil before hanging it up in his bedroom. He said that one night he was struggling with severe pain when he began speaking to Jesus Christ about his life and struggles which led to an immense light coming out of the crucifix and illuminating the room. This incident inspired him to accept his suffering despite his dislike of it and to transmit the messages in the Gospel to others to find God. This had transformed Rocchi from sadness and crisis to one of peace and a desire to do good for others and he would later reflect that "suffering made me realize that it is sweet to be loved".

=== Adulthood ===
People often came to see Rocchi at his home for brief catechesis lessons or for spiritual counsel or even just to give him their good wishes (it included his bishop and future cardinal Ersilio Tonini who often visited him). It made him a known figure in his hometown and the opposite of his childhood when his peers often mocked him for his weaknesses that he discerned became his strengths. He also knew and corresponded with Bishop (later cardinal) Loris Francesco Capovilla whom he would often speak with or see in Loreto. In the 1960s the Augustinian priest Angelo Alessandri visited him often to bring him the Eucharist and to hear his confession. Alessandri once even accompanied Rocchi on a pilgrimage to Loreto while his mother accompanied him on a pilgrimage to Lourdes in 1969. The Rocchi's relocated to a new home in Viale Vittorio Veneto 52 in the Santissimo Crocifisso parish in Tolentino. He relied on his parents to care for him during this time since he was unable to live alone and never married despite wanting to when he finished his education. In his life he wrote frequent letters but as his life went on could no longer use his arms and hands. To that end he had a device built that had a short pole attached to his mouth that he could direct so he could use touch the letters on his typewriter that became a permanent fixture in his room. Rocchi also became part of the Rete Radié Resch network that the journalist and politician Ettore Masina co-founded alongside the French liberation theologian Paul Gauthier. He also started writing articles for the Messaggero di Sant'Antonio in the 1970s until his death. In one such article in 1975 he said that "these are bestial times ... when God is excluded, the door is opened to the beast" in reference to unloving people and the need for people to love more. Rocchi heard a television report in 1971 detailing his disease which prompted him to send a letter to his friend Gabriella Bentivoglio (whom he met in 1963) asking for relevant data on that television piece since he had the disease it referred to. Bentivoglio transmitted his letter to Ettore Masina – a journalist from Rai 2 – who contacted him with the data and asked Rocchi to join the network that he had co-founded. His reputation was noted in Tolentino and the wider Macerata region and he would often be referred to as the "saint in a wheelchair" which was a moniker given to him even after his death and which is still continued at present.

=== Declining health and death ===
He lived out his final month in an intensive care unit at the Ospedale Generale Provincale Macerata since 8 March 1979 due to a severe deterioration in his condition. He had fallen ill with bronchitis at the beginning of February prompting the doctor to refer him to the hospital for treatment. He had entered the emergency room with a diagnosis of acute respiratory distress which prompted for him to be intubated and attached to an automatic respirator. This machine passed through his vocal cords rendering him unable to speak. The machine was removed and a tracheotomy was performed in order to improve his breathing though still prevented him from speaking. This forced him to use an alphabet list to compose words or messages to nurses or to his relatives and visitors; he also asked for a bell in case of emergencies. His nurse later recalled that Rocchi was an ideal patient because he cooperated with them. From 23 March he could no longer react or communicate with others and his condition became critical on 24 March. He died at around 10:00 pm on 26 March due to a cardio- circulatory arrest. His remains are interred in Tolentino.

His friend Saulo Baroncia said after his death that Rocchi had "occupied a privileged place in paradise". Cardinal Angelo Comastri – who developed a devotion to Rocchi while the Prelate of Loreto – presided over an event in the Co-Cathedral of San Catervo di Tolentino to celebrate the news in 2014 that Rocchi's beatification process had advanced to the next stage. Loris Francesco Capovilla said that Rocchi was an "impeded man" but one who was "in the presence of the Lord" while Ettore Masina referred to Rocchi as a "sentinel of conscience and reason". Cardinal Ersilio Tonini would later mention that he could see Rocchi's love and passion for God while seeing how God guided his actions and words. Tonini recalled at a conference dedicated to him in 1992 that Rocchi disliked rewrote forbut accepted it as a manner in which he could support others who had similar circumstances. He had left around 1700 letters during his life.

== Beatification process ==
The beatification process for Rocchi launched on 9 April 1992 after the Congregation for the Causes of Saints issued the nihil obstat ("no objections") edict and titled Rocchi as a Servant of God. This edict therefore enabled for Rocchi's diocese to commence a diocesan investigation looking into his reputation for holiness and gathering documentation, such as Rocchi's letters, and testimonies of witnesses. On 17 October 1992, the diocesan process was opened in the Diocese of Macerata-Tolentino-Recanati-Cingoli-Treia and was closed on 22 April 1995. The process moved to Rome where the Congregation as given control of the cause. It issued a decree on 13 September 2009 validating the diocesan process as having conformed to the department's rules for conducting diocesan investigations for causes. The Congregation were later given the positio around Easter in 2003.

Nine theologians met and approved the cause on 16 June 2013 after reviewing the dossier as did the Congregation. Rocchi became titled as venerable on 3 April 2014 after Pope Francis signed a decree that acknowledged that Rocchi had practiced heroic virtue throughout his life to a sufficient degree. The postulator for this cause is the priest Rino Ramaccioni.
