= Adolfo Barberis =

Italian Roman Catholic priest

Venerable Adolfo Barberis
- Born: 1 June 1884; Turin, Kingdom of Italy
- Died: 24 September 1967 (aged 83); Turin, Italy

Adolfo Barberis (1 June 1884 - 24 September 1967) was an Italian Roman Catholic priest and the founder of the Sisters of Christian Servanthood. Barberis served as the assistant to the Archbishop of Turin from 1906 until the cardinal's death in 1923 at which point he worked for sometime as a professor. He did this while managing the functions of the religious congregation he established which he had dedicated to the education and care of women in domestic service. The consequences of World War I were enough to convince him to found a religious congregation to help women though he often faced difficulties in dealing with Cardinal Maurilio Fossati in the beginning of the latter's tenure as Archbishop of Turin. These disagreements came due to Fossati's limited knowledge of Barberis' work and the slander levelled against him sometime before that. This slander came in 1923 after his cardinal benefactor died as some fellow priests suggested he garnered too much power in his position.

Barberis nonetheless was rehabilitated towards the end of his life when his good friend Cardinal Michele Pellegrino dispelled the allegations leveled against him. Health concerns plagued him towards the rest of his life and he retired to the congregation's motherhouse where he later died from his ailments. Pope Francis confirmed his life of heroic virtue and named him as venerable.

== Life ==
Adolfo Barberis was born in Turin on 1 June 1884 as the second of four children to the Novara-born dentist Carlo Barberis and Teresa Chione di Caluso. He had one sister (who preceded him) Clelia and two successive brothers after him named Giacomo and Carlo. His mother was pious and gentle while his father was often brash and abrasive with little tenderness for his children. Barberis was baptized at Pentecost on 7 June 1884 in the parish church of Santa Giulia (a church the baroness Venerable Juliette Colbert de Barolo established) in the Vanchiglia village. The Barberis's later moved in the same village closer to the parish of San Tommaso Apostolo which was under the governance of the Order of Friars Minor who prepared Barberis for his First Communion on 27 April 1893 and his Confirmation less than a month later.

Barberis studied for the priesthood in the seminaries in Turin (1895–1900) and then in Giaveno where he received the cassock on 15 August 1900 from the curate of San Carlo. He studied also in Chieri from 1900 to 1902 for philosophical studies and then underwent his theological studies from 1902 to 1907.

He received his ordination to the priesthood on 29 June 1907 in the metropolitan cathedral from the Cardinal Archbishop of Turin Agostino Richelmy who had appointed him as his personal assistant months prior in 1906. He celebrated his first Mass on 30 June 1907 in the San Carlo church. Barberis founded a college hostel for students around this time and became invested in diocesan pilgrimages to Lourdes. But he soon harbored desires to join the missions and to join the Consolata Missionaries. But Cardinal Richelmy dissuaded him from doing this. But this did not prevent him from 1907 to 1909 going to the Consolata Missionaries' convent to receive spiritual direction from the two brothers Blessed Giovanni Maria Boccardo and Blessed Luigi Boccardo. In his role as the cardinal's aide he accompanied his benefactor and patron to the papal conclave in 1914 and the conclave in 1922. He also looked after the cardinal when Richelmy was ill. The cardinal had complete trust and confidence in Barberis which frustrated his colleagues who believed that he had too much influence and power.

Barberis had a passion for sacred art and was appointed to oversee the education of seminarians in sacred art, once Pope Pius X ordered that seminaries teach it. In 1915 Barberi was appointed chaplain of the Maria Letizia military hospital.

== Founder ==
He paid particular attention to the needs of women in domestic service and saw the consequences of World War I on them. Many women immigrated to Turin to find work as maids. He set himself on the establishment of a religious congregation that would render aid to them as well as both oversee their education and instill moral values in them. The social degradation and poor jobs available to women also motivated him to found an order which was something that Cardinal Richelmy encouraged him to do. He founded in 1921 the Sisters of Christian Servanthood. The Bishop of Ivrea Paolo Rostagno would later provide diocesan approval for his order on 8 December 1953. The cardinal died due to illness in 1923 (he tended to him in his final illness) and Barberis was appointed as a professor before being made a parish priest. But the cardinal's death also prompted his fellow priests to isolate him since they believed that Barberis had too much influence and power in archdiocesan duties.

In April 1924 he left the episcopal palace to begin his professorship in addition to his duties with his religious congregation. Richelmy's successor Cardinal Giuseppe Gamba liked Barberis and it was he who appointed him as a professor. It was at some stage that Barberis helped the poor Giuseppe Garneri begin his ecclesial studies; Garneri would later become the Bishop of Susa. Cardinal Maurilio Fossati later became the Archbishop of Turin and both he and Barberis had an initial tense relationship since Fossati did not quite understand Barberis's work. This later was dispelled and the two soon collaborated with each other. It was at some stage that he became friends with Giuseppina Operti. He was also good friends with the Archbishop of Turin Michele Pellegrino who helped Barberis dispel all slanderous allegations that had been made against him decades prior. Barberis's congregation was later aggregated to the Conventual Franciscans on 2 August 1955.

Barberi's health declined over time to the point where he had to have several operations including one to remove a tumor in 1958. He had an operation for prostate cancer and two for bowel cancer. He suffered a collapse in 1961 and suffered a cardiac crisis just months before he died. Barberis died during the evening on 24 September 1967 in the congregation's house in Turin at Via Lomellina. His remains are located in the motherhouse in Turin. The congregation expanded to Mexico and Colombia and as of 2005 had 50 religious sisters in a total of nine houses.

== Beatification process ==
The beatification process was launched in Turin in a diocesan investigation to assess his life and virtues; this process spanned from its opening on 8 February 1995 until its formal closure on 4 July 1998. But the formal introduction to the cause came on 13 March 1995 under Pope John Paul II after the Congregation for the Causes of Saints titled him as a Servant of God and declared the nihil obstat ("no objections") to the cause. The Congregation later validated the diocesan investigation on 26 February 1999 and received the positio in 2001 for evaluation.

Theologians were unanimous in their approval of the cause on 15 January 2013 and the cardinal and bishop members of the Congregation were also unanimous in their approval of the cause on 4 March 2014. Barberis was named as venerable on 3 April 2014 after Pope Francis confirmed that he had lived a life of heroic virtue. The postulator for this cause is Fr. Flavio Peloso.
