= Alessandro Luzzago =

Italian theologian, philosopher and educator

Venerable Alessandro Luzzago
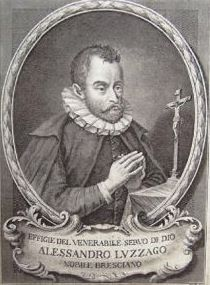
- Born: October 1551; Brescia, Italy
- Died: 7 May 1602 (aged 50); Milan, Italy
- Resting place: Santa Maria della Pace

Alessandro Luzzago (October 1551, Brescia - 7 May 1602, Milan) was an Italian nobleman and organizer of Catholic charities. He was declared venerable in 1899 by Pope Leo XIII.

== Life ==
Luzzago was the son of Girolamo Luzzago and Paola Peschiera. He was baptised on November 8 in the Church of Santa Maria in Calchera. The Luzzago family was one of the most important noble families of Brescia. His mother was an early collaborator of Saint Angela Merici.

Luzzago received his first formation at Gavardo under the priest Marcantonio Roccio. From 1570, he studied philosophy with the Jesuits at the Convent of San Antonio. On 25 and 26 October 1573 he defended his thesis, In universam philosophiam cum practicam tum speculativam necnon in logicam veterum aeque ac recentium philosophorum sententiae et theoremata varia publice discutienda (Brescia, 1573). Between 1578 and 1582, with the help of Saint Charles Borromeo, he studied theology with the Jesuits at the Palazzo Brera in Milan. In 1586 he received the clerical tonsure which was required for him to receive the doctorate in philosophy and theology from the University of Padua. Luzzago was eager to join the Jesuits, but he was prevented from doing so on account of the economic difficulties of his family, caused by some inappropriate transactions by his father.

In 1584, Luzzago became of member of Brescia's city council and he began his work to harmonize the relationships between the city government and various church charitable organisations. In 1595 he was appointed curator of the Monti di Pietà in Brescia. In 1597 he was elected protector of the Compagnia delle Dimesse di Sant' Orsola and of two other charitable institutes in Brescia: the Soccorso and the Zitelle. He reorganized and gave new impetus to the city's revised catechetical programme which arose after the Council of Trent. For the students he founded the Congregation of Saint Catherine of Siena. To ensure that his work continued, he founded the Congregation of the Holy Spirit, which gathered the members of the city's ruling class with the aim of cooperating more effectively in supporting all charitable institutions.

In 1589, Luzzago accompanied to Rome Cardinal Gianfrancesco Morosini, who was bishop of Brescia and papal nuncio to France. During this trip to Rome he studied the various church charities in Rome which he later proposed in Brescia. He also had the opportunity to meet Saint Philip Neri. In a 1595 letter from Morosini's secretary, Luzzago was informed that Pope Clement VIII was considering him as the next archbishop of Milan.

Luzzago fell sick on 3 May 1602 and died on 7 May. After his funeral in Milan, his body was buried in the church of Santa Barnaba in Brescia. In 1878 his remains were transferred to the church of Santa Maria della Pace in Bresica, where they still remain today.

Luzzago is a collateral ancestor of Fra' Marco Luzzago.

== Beatification process ==
At Luzzago's funeral, Cardinal Federico Borromeo said, "I honour this body not as a friend but as a saint".

In 1625 the City Council of Brescia asked the bishop to begin Luzzago's cause of beatification. The diocesan investigation was opened on 13 February 1658. In 1751 the cause was transferred to the Sacred Congregation of Rites in Rome. In 1899 Pope Leo XIII promulgated a decree recognising his heroic virtues, thus conferring on him the title of a Venerable.

In 2014 Luzzago's spiritual writings were published. Among his writings is an Instruction for the Knights of Malta, in which he proposes various practices for their sanctification, including a course modeled upon the Spiritual Exercises of Ignatius of Loyola and a list of readings taken from contemporary ascetics.

== Bibliography ==
- Cistellini, Antonio. Alessandro Luzzago. Brescia: Centro di documentazione, 1998.
- Frugoni, Arsenio. Alessandro Luzzago e la sua opera nella controriforma bresciana. Brescia: Apollonio, 1937.
- Girelli, Elisabetta. Vita del venerabile Alessandro Luzzago patrizio bresciano. Torino: Tipografia e libreria salesiana, 1883.
- Hermanni, Ottavio. Vita di Alessandro Luzago, gentil'huomo bresciano. 3. ed. Roma: Tip. Vaticana, 1891.
