= Vittorio Trancanelli =

Venerable Vittorio Trancanelli
- Born: 26 April 1944; Spello, Perugia, Kingdom of Italy
- Died: 24 June 1998 (aged 54); Cenerente, Perugia, Italy

Vittorio Trancanelli (26 April 1944 – 24 June 1998) was an Italian Roman Catholic physician from Perugia. He gained a strong reputation for both his good work as a doctor and for his personal holiness which was evident in his interactions with people he worked with. Trancanelli served as a doctor in Perugia where he aided all those who were sick irrespective of circumstance or otherwise. His deep faith in God was a crucial factor in his medical career. He worked with the disabled and welcomed them into his home.

Pope Francis titled him as venerable in 2017 upon confirming Trancanelli's heroic virtue.

== Life ==
Vittorio Trancanelli was born on 26 April 1944 to Saverio Trancanelli and Carolina Sedevcic in Spello in Perugia.

He studied medicine at the University of Perugia where he graduated. He also liked to learn about Sacred Scripture and Etruscology. He married Rosalia Sabatini on 18 October 1965 and became quite ill in 1976 prior to the birth of his son Diego. His illness returned in 1981 before the birth of his second child. He had an operation for ulcerative colitis which had evolved into peritonitis. He and his wife adopted seven others with some of them being disabled though loved all the same.

Trancanelli devoted his life to his medical career and his firm faith in God became a critical factor in his career. He welcomed the sick and disabled into his home and helped all those who needed him irrespective of their circumstances or otherwise. Trancanelli was enthralled with Judaism – as Jesus Christ was a Jew – and he contributed to Jewish festivals and attempted to learn the language. He was a frequent contributor to the Ecumenical Centre of Saint Martin where the elders there dubbed him as "our rabbi". He worked at the Silvestrini Hospital in Perugia.

He became ill in March 1998 and died three months later on 24 June 1998. He was dubbed "The Saint of the operating room". Archbishop Giuseppe Chiaretti celebrated the funeral mass in which his coffin was draped with a tallit due to his love for the Jewish people. It saw a massive number of people and those of the Jewish faith attend. Chiaretti referred to Trancanelli as a "saint of our time" who espoused a "civilization of love". His remains were later removed and relocated elsewhere in February 2013 in light of the beatification process (to the parish at Cenerente) and once again on 2 July 2017 to the chapel of the Santa Maria della Misericordia hospital. Cardinal Gualtiero Bassetti presided over the second transferral.

== Beatification process ==
The beatification process commenced on 22 June 2006 and the introduction of the cause granted him the posthumous title of Servant of God. The process in Perugia spanned from 24 September 2006 until 23 June 2013; the process received formal ratification on 12 December 2013 from the Congregation for the Causes of Saints. The postulation submitted the positio to the Congregation in 2015 while theologians voiced their approval to the cause on 21 June 2016. The Congregation approved the cause on 21 February 2017 at which point Pope Francis titled Trancanelli as venerable after confirming his heroic virtue. The postulator for this cause is Enrico Graziano Giovnani Solinas.
