= Thomas Choe Yang-eop =

Venerable Choe Yang-Eop Thomas

Priest
- Born: 1 March 1821; Cheongyang County, Chungcheong Province, Joseon
- Died: 15 June 1861 (aged 40); Jincheon County, Chungcheong Province, Joseon
- Venerated in: Roman Catholic Church
- Patronage: Missionaries; Persecuted Christians; Travellers

- Thomas Choe Yang-eop
- Hangul: 최양업
- Hanja: 崔良業
- RR: Choe Yangeop
- MR: Ch'oe Yangŏp

Choe Yang-Eop Thomas (1 March 1821 – 15 June 1861), also spelled Ch'oe Yang-Ōp Thomas, was a Korean Roman Catholic priest during the Joseon dynasty, who travelled across Eastern Asia as a seminarian and priest before settling at last after a period of persecution back in his homeland where he administered to hidden Christians until his death.

His father was canonized as a saint in 1984 and his mother was beatified in 2014.

His cause for sainthood commenced in 2004 in a move that accorded him the title of Servant of God. On 26 April 2016 he was proclaimed to be Venerable after Pope Francis recognized his life of heroic virtue.

== Life ==
Choe Yang-Eop Thomas was born in Korea on 1 March 1821 to Saint Francis Choe Kyeong-Hwan and Blessed Mary Yi Seong-rye. During his childhood he followed his father from place to place in order to avoid persecution and settled after a long period of travel in Burisan.

Saint Pierre Philibert Maubant (1803–1839) – from the Paris Foreign Missions Society – came to Korea with fellow missionaries of the congregation at the end of 1825 and met with Thomas; the priest was impressed with him so in 1836 took Thomas with him as a seminarian. On 6 February 1836 he was invited to Maubant's home for lessons in Latin – a prerequisite for the priesthood. He and fellow seminarian Andrew Kim Taegon (1821–1846) were selected to live with Maubant and arrived there on 14 March 1836 and 11 July respectively; the two lived and studied with the priest.

On 3 December 1836 he and his fellow seminarians placed their hands of the Bible and took an oath of obedience before setting off for further education in Macao; the group arrived there on 7 June 1837. In November 1837 he suspended his studies due to the death of his friend and companion Francis Xavier Choe who died of the fever. In 1839 he left for Manila due to disturbances in Macao but returned there at the end of 1839. In April 1842 he left Macao once more after France made known their intention for a trade agreement with Korea; the French required interpreters for its fleet and so Father Napoleon Libois – the superior of the Far Eastern Headquarters – managed to get Choe and Kim on board the two French vessels. But the French reached Nanjing and did not want to travel further in a move that allowed the two seminarians to disembark and travel to Liaodont in order to find a route back home to Korea.

The two companions travelled to Xiaobajiazi (小八家子) in Manchuria and continued their education for the priesthood under the direction of Bishop Jean-Joseph-Jean-Baptiste Ferréol (d. 1853). In 1843 – through Libois – he joined the Paris-based Order of the Immaculate Heart of Mary (SS. Coeur de Marie). The two seminarians were received into the diaconate by Bishop Ferréol on 10 December 1844 while Kim received his ordination as the first Korean priest from Bishop Ferréol around that same time. Kim left with the bishop and Father Anthony Daveluy for Korea while Thomas remained behind with Father Joseph Maistre in Xiaobajiazi.

Choe began searching for a route home and met secret envoys of the Korean Catholic Church and heard of the 1845 persecution in which his friend Kim was beheaded. The envoys convinced Thomas that it would be futile to return home so he went to the Far Eastern Headquarters that had been moved to Hong Kong where he translated "The Achievements of the Korean Martyrs" into Latin. In August 1847 he boarded a French warship and made an attempt to meet with the secret envoys back in his homeland; his effort failed and so he gave up the idea of returning home for the time being.

He moved to Shanghai and was at last ordained to the priesthood on 15 April 1849 – the presiding celebrant of his ordination was the Franciscan Bishop Francesco Xavier Maresca (1805–1855). He left Shanghai the following month and travelled to Liaodong where he began his pastoral ministry under the direction of Bishop Saint Siméon-François Berneux (1814–1866). In November 1849 he met with Maistre and later met with envoys on 3 December 1849; he returned to his homeland while Maistre couldn't lest he risk exposure and potential persecution.

He met with Ferréol and Daveluy and began to visit the hidden Christians in his homeland. From 1850 to 1861, Father Choi Yang-eop conducted pastoral activities in areas that were difficult for French missionaries to access. The beginning of 1860 saw him visit around 3815 Christians. He translated catechism books from Chinese and put Catholic teaching to verse to aid learning. Sometimes he was mistaken for a foreigner and was chased from villages; on one occasion in 1859 he was severely beaten by local authorities and non-believers and was also chased from an inn half-naked.

Choe died on 15 June 1861 due to typhoid fever. Father John Pourthia heard of Choe' illness and so rushed to his side prior to the latter's death. His solemn funeral was celebrated five months later while his remains were interred in a hill behind the Baeron seminary.

=== Parentage ===
His father was Francis Choe Kyeong-Hwan (1805 – 12 September 1831). He was beatified by Pope Pius XI alongside fellow martyrs on 5 July 1925 and was canonized as a saint by Pope John Paul II on 6 May 1984.

His mother was Mary Yi Seong-rye (1801–31 January 1840). She was made a Servant of God on 6 October 2003 by Pope John Paul II alongside her fellow martyrs and received beatification from Pope Francis on 16 August 2014.

== Beatification process ==
The beatification process was transferred from its then-forum of Cheongju on 10 January 2004 to Masan. It allowed for the Congregation for the Causes of Saints – under Pope John Paul II – to grant the "nihil obstat" ('nothing against') to the cause in which Thomas was accorded the posthumous title of Servant of God: the first official stage in the process.

The diocesan process opened in the Diocese of Masan on 3 December 2005 and closed on 20 May 2009; the C.C.S. validated the process in Rome on 1 October 2010. The postulation then submitted the Positio to the C.C.S. in 2014 while the latter passed it onto a board of historians for their own assessment. It was approved on 18 November 2014. Theologians voiced approval to the cause on 15 December 2015 while the C.C.S. did likewise on 14 March 2016. On 26 April 2016 he was proclaimed to be Venerable after Pope Francis acknowledged that Choe had lived a model life of heroic virtue.

The current postulator that is assigned to the cause is the Rev. Kim Jong-su John.
