= Marcello Labor =

Italian Roman Catholic priest and former doctor

Venerable Marcello Labor

Priest
- Born: 8 July 1890; Trieste, Kingdom of Italy
- Died: 29 September 1954 (aged 64); Trieste, Italy
- Resting place: Trieste, Italy
- Venerated in: Roman Catholic Church
- Attributes: Priest's attire
- Patronage: Doctors; Writers; Converts

Marcello Labor (8 July 1890 – 29 September 1954) – born Marcello Loewy – was an Italian Roman Catholic priest and former doctor. Labor was born to Jewish parents and was Jewish himself until his conversion to Roman Catholicism on 23 December 1914. He married Elsa Reiss in 1912 after the pair met at college in Austria and had three children together during the course of World War I. It was during that conflict that he served as a medical officer and was once a Russian captive until his release a short time later. He opened a medical practice in Pula in Croatia where he dedicated himself to the poor as well as to a range of different social issues and collaborated with Catholic Action in the region. He even changed his last name at the behest of his father in order to make him seem more Italianized.

He was a lover of literature and published around 200 articles in various newspapers and magazines. The sudden death of his wife in 1934 left him alone since his children were adults. This prompted him to join the priesthood and he was ordained as such in 1940 after the Salesians of Don Bosco rejected his application to join their religious congregation. He served as a noted preacher and spiritual director and served a Fascist exile towards the end of World War II. His Jewish origins and his status as a priest saw Josip Broz Tito and his communists imprison him for several months.

Labor died from a heart attack in late 1954 as he himself predicted. His cause for canonization was launched some decades after and culminated on 5 June 2015 after Pope Francis confirmed his life of heroic virtue and named him as Venerable.

== Life ==
Marcello Labor was born in mid-1890 in Trieste as the second of two children born to the Hungarian-born banker (and Jewish) Carlo (18.08.1856–30.07.1931) and the Italian-born Miriam Forti (26.10.1865–07.10.1897). His brother was Ferruccio (08.05.1888–28.01.1923) and his sole maternal uncle was Gino Forti (11.06.1864–08.12.1914). His father was from Kanisza.

From his childhood he loved to write and often kept diaries and correspondence with other contemporaries during the course of his studies in Trieste. Those he corresponded with included people such as Guido Devescovi and Scipio Slataper. He also became friends with Guglielmo Reiss-Romoli who later became his brother-in-law. His love for literature would be something that would grow over time and remain until his death decades later. He later attended the college in Vienna where he would meet his future wife Elsa Reiss (17.01.1891–17.01.1934) whom he married in the Jewish rite in 1912 in Trieste. He graduated in medicine in 1914 and received his degree in Graz. Labor and Elsa were both baptized into Roman Catholicism on 23 December 1914 and fathered three children with his wife. His children were:

- Maria (04.01.1915–09.03.1916) – born and died in Trieste
- Giuliana Guarnero (13.03.1917–14.12.2005) – born in Croatia
- Livio Labor (01.07.1918–09.04.1999) – born in Lviv

Labor became a medical officer in the Italian armed forces during World War I and served on the frontlines in Austro-Hungarian territories including Ljubljana. But Russian soldiers captured him at some stage during the conflict though later released him. The conflict's end saw him settle in Pula in Croatia where he set up his medical practice and helped raise his children alongside his wife. His father also suggested he change is Jewish surname to "Labor" so as to take focus off his Jewish roots since his father predicted that this would bring trouble if he kept his original surname. Labor worked for the poor and dedicated himself to social justice issues while he also published over 200 pieces on different topics in local newspapers and magazines during the course of the 1930s. He also collaborated with the Catholic Action movement and the Saint Vincent de Paul group operating in the area. He also founded the "Catholic Center" as a place that could teach doctrine and encourage Eucharistic devotion through adoration. Labor studied the tuberculosis disease as a doctor as well as a range of other ailments in his work as a medical researcher in addition to general practitioner. Labor's extensive diaries spanned several and detailed his medical research as well as his interest in the faith and his activities while living in Pula.

But the Labor's fortunes halted in 1934 after Elsa died in Pula after a sudden decline in health that saw one of her legs amputated. His adult children had lives of their own at this point which left Labor alone to pursue his call to the priesthood after having asked for special permission to do so due to his married state and conversion. He also had a special respect for the Salesians of Don Bosco and had applied to enter their religious congregation. But he was upset when the congregation denied his request and refused him admittance which prompted him to settle on diocesan priesthood rather than religious priesthood. He commenced his ecclesial studies and later received his solemn ordination to the priesthood in Trieste in the San Giusto cathedral on 21 September 1940 from the Bishop of Trieste Antonio Santin. Labor was then appointed as the rector for Trieste seminarians and then served also as a spiritual director in Gorizia. He later served as a pastor for the San Giusto cathedral (since 1948 after the death of Monsignor Guido Galvani) and became a noted preacher and spiritual director.

From 1943 until the war's end in 1945 he was subjected to a Fascist exile due to the dual offences of being both a priest and Jewish in origin. To that end he worked as the vicar for the parish of Fossalta di Portogruaro for the duration of his exile. His misfortune continued after the war after Josip Broz Tito and his anti-Christian communists imprisoned him on 13 August 1947. Labor was tried and sentenced to imprisonment that would have seen him released in late 1948 though he was released just a few months after on 30 December. It was at some point during his priesthood that he was named as a Monsignor. Labor later was made the rector of seminarians at Capodistria.

Labor died on 29 September 1954 in Trieste at Via Besenghi due to a heart attack. He himself predicted that he would die of a heart attack. The marker for his tomb in the church of Sant'Antonio Taumaturgo reads: "Marcello Labor: former parish priest of San Giusto". In his will he asked to be buried in his soutaine with no liturgical vestments or other insignia and dictated himself the simple words that would mark his grave.

== Beatification process ==
The process for his beatification opened under Pope John Paul II on 25 April 1996 after the Congregation for the Causes of Saints titled Labor as a Servant of God and published the "nihil obstat" edict (no objections to the cause) that launched the diocesan process of investigation. This process was held in Trieste and was closed on 11 June 2000 with the C.C.S. providing validation for the investigation in Rome on 1 February 2001 before receiving the Positio dossier for assessment in 2004.

Nine theologians voiced their assent to the cause on 13 February 2014 as did the cardinal and bishop members of the C.C.S. later on 2 June 2015. The process culminated on 5 June 2015 after Pope Francis confirmed that Labor lived a model life of heroic virtue and named him as Venerable.

The current postulator for this cause is the Franciscan friar Giovangiuseppe Califano.
