= Ludovico Coccapani =

Italian Roman Catholic teacher

Venerable Ludovico Coccapani OFS
- Born: 23 June 1849; Calcinaia, Pisa, Grand Duchy of Tuscany
- Died: 14 November 1931 (aged 82); Calcinaia, Pisa, Kingdom of Italy
- Resting place: Pisa, Italy

Ludovico Coccapani (23 June 1849 – 14 November 1931) was an Italian Roman Catholic teacher and professed member from the Secular Franciscan Order. He also served the President of the Conference of Saint Vincent de Paul in its Pisan division. He was a noted figure in Pisa due to his charitable activities; he was close with important figures of that era in Pisa including Cardinal Pietro Maffi and Giuseppe Toniolo who both had an interest in education.

His cause for beatification commenced in 1949 in a long and complex process that halted in 1966. It reopened several decades later and continued in Pisa after the resolution of the reasons for the initial stop. The commencement of the cause saw him titled as a Servant of God. Pope Francis titled him as Venerable on 7 November 2018 upon confirmation of his heroic virtue.

== Life ==
Ludovico Coccapani was born in Pisa on 23 June 1849 to bourgeois parents Sigismondo Coccapani and Fortunata Guelfi; he was baptized on 24 June as "Ludovico Francesco Angiolo Cesare". His paternal side consisted of noted potters. This line of ceramists in 1739 took over the management of a ceramics workshop in Montecchio and later in 1746 arrived and settled in Calcinaia to continue their business.

His parents died when he was a child, with one having died when he was eight in 1857; he therefore lived with his brother and sisters of which he was the lastborn. He received the sacrament of confirmation on 23 June 1856 from Cardinal Cosimo Corsi.

He did his studies in Pisa where he obtained a diploma in education around 1867. He taught first in Pisa for a brief period and then later in Fucecchio in Florence from 14 September 1867 but was forced to return home for health reasons in 1869. In 1872 he taught at Pietrasanta and then in 1874 decided that he would dedicate himself to a range of charitable works for the betterment of others. He never married and lived in Pisa with his priest brother Lionello and his two sisters Teresina and Rosina.

In 1874 he decided to devote his life to the poor and to that end soon discovered the life and charism of Francis of Assisi. He felt that Francis' guidelines in his Rule were things that he could do in Pisa as his true calling and so decided to join the Secular Franciscan Order. He vested in their habit on 7 December 1907 and made his profession on 8 December 1908. He began working for the Saint Vincent de Paul organization based in Pisa in 1894. He also served as a teacher and he educated children including those who had been abandoned and/or neglected.

He also visited prisons and he frequented those places in order to reach out to the prisoners and to bring them a message of hope as well as to teach them of the messages contained in the Gospel while attempting to emulate the merciful love of Jesus Christ. Coccapani was devoted to the Eucharist and was an ardent devotee of the Blessed Mother. His confessor and close friend was the Cardinal Carlo Rossi (future Servant of God) and he had also met and worked with Giuseppe Toniolo. He was likewise close with Cardinal Pietro Maffi who invested Coccapani with the civil class honor of the Knight of the Pontifical Order of San Gregorio Magno. In 1914 he became the president of the Pisan detail of the Vicentian Conference and carried out the duties of the organization during World War I; it was during that conflict that he took care of war orphans.

He died at his home in Pisa in the evening on 14 November 1931 due to pneumonia he had contracted earlier that week. He was granted a simple funeral and buried in a simple grave as per the instructions he laid out in his last will which also stipulated that his home was to become a kindergarten. His remains were exhumed in December 2015 and placed back into his grave after examination and canonical inspection was completed.

=== Legacies ===
His influence became widespread in Pisa and the surrounding areas to the point where he earned the moniker of the "Knight of God". In the parish of Saint Francis there was a soup kitchen that was named after him following his 1931 death.

== Beatification process ==
The beatification process commenced in 1949 in Pisa — Caccapini therefore became titled as a Servant of God— and lasted until 1966 at which point the cause stopped. It remained in that inactive state until 1989 when the Archbishop of Pisa, Alessandro Plotti, requested that it be reopened. The cause continued due to this new impetus and was closed on 15 November 1996. On 28 January 1997, the Congregation for the Causes of Saints granted their formal approval to the cause with the nihil obstat ("nothing against") and around that time issued a decree validating the diocesan process. On 7 November 2018 Pope Francis confirmed Coccapani exercised heroic virtue and so titled him as venerable. The postulator of the cause current one is Damian-Gheorghe Pătraşcu OFMConv.
