= Matteo Farina =

Italian Venerable

Venerable Matteo Farina
- Born: 19 September 1990; Avellino, Italy
- Died: 24 April 2009 (aged 18); Brindisi, Italy
- Resting place: Brindisi-Ostuni Cathedral

Matteo Farina (19 September 1990 – 24 April 2009) was an Italian Roman Catholic. Farina spent his entire life in Brindisi where he was an excellent student who developed a passion for science and for music (which came from his father) and who was noted for his devotion to Pio of Pietrelcina and Francis of Assisi, as well as to other saints who were close to him in age. He spent the last decade of his life struggling with a brain tumor that later led to his death; he was forced to seek treatment outside of Brindisi in attempt to remove the tumor.

Farina's reputation for personal holiness was evident throughout his life. This led to the introduction of his beatification process on 11 April 2016, just seven years after his death, when he assumed the title Servant of God. On 5 May 2020 he was declared venerable.

== Life ==
Matteo Farina was born on 19 September 1990 in Avellino (the birthplace of his paternal grandfather) as the second of two children born to Miky Farina (a bank clerk) and Paola Sabbatini (a housewife); his elder sister was Erika whom he was close to. Farina was baptized on 28 October in the Ave Maris Stella parish church in Brindisi where the Farina's lived.

Farina made his first confession (Reconciliation) when he was eight and on 4 June 2000 made his First Communion; he received confirmation on 10 May 2003 from the Archbishop of Brindisi-Ostuni, Settimo Todisco. For his confirmation he selected his older sister to be his sponsor due to their close relationship. Farina also had a dream during the night of 2–3 January 2000, in which he saw Pio of Pietrelcina who revealed to him the secret of Christian happiness, urging Farina to spread this knowledge to others; this dream made him realize that he was meant to evangelize this secret in order to lead others to God.

Throughout his life, he had a deep devotion to Francis of Assisi and to Pio of Pietrelcina and would recite the rosary each day and read the Gospel; he also made his confession once a week. Farina also attended Eucharistic Adoration often. Farina also had a devotion to Gemma Galgani and Pier Giorgio Frassati while the writings of Thérèse of Lisieux inspired him. From his father he acquired a strong liking for music and he was trained to play several musical instruments by his father while with his friends and he formed a music band called "No Name". His friends would often refer to Farina as "the moralizer" since he often spoke about God and encouraged peace. He also had a passion for chemistry and considered continuing his studies in the environmental engineering field. He liked information technology during his time at school. Farina created a fund for the missions in Mozambique and deposited his savings there while urging his parents to replace Christmas shopping with sending something to the poor of Africa. In April 2007, he began dating a girl named Serena (with whom he remained until his death) and referred to her once as "the most beautiful gift that the Lord could give."

In September 2003, he began experiencing severe headaches and vision problems and so he travelled with his parents and his uncle Rosario for a series of health checks conducted in Avellino and Verona hospitals before a two-week visit to Hannover for a brain biopsy the next month. On their return to Brindisi he believed his health problems were over but the tests soon showed an extended edema in the right temporo-occipital area of his brain with malignant cells also suspected. Farina had a severe seizure ten months later and found his vision was impaired. This forced him to go to Germany for a craniotomy operation to remove a third degree brain tumor in January 2005. He spent over a month undergoing chemotherapy in Milan and was able to return to Brindisi on 2 April 2005 — the date on which Pope John Paul II died — and had periodic checks until 2007 when it was believed that the disease was regressing. But this was short lived, as Farina experienced the first recurrence in December 2007. In October 2008 he left for Hannover for checks in which the second recurrence was discovered, at which stage his mother felt it was appropriate for him to receive the anointing of the sick. Farina had the first of three operations to remove the tumor on 9 December 2008 but his condition worsened and in January 2009 he underwent the third operation. He returned to Brindisi on 13 February 2009 with paralysis of his arm and left leg (due to the operations) and began using a wheelchair in order to move around. In late March he had a high fever which saw him admitted to the Antonio Perrino Hospital where he received an Easter blessing from Archbishop Rocco Talucci.

His doctors were unable to do anything more for Farina and advised him to return home. He received his final communion on 13 April 2009 and died a week later on 24 April. Farina's remains were relocated on 29 September 2017 to the Brindisi-Ostuni Cathedral at a Mass which was presided over by Archbishop Domenico Caliandro.

== Beatification process ==
The beatification process for Farina launched on 11 April 2016 after the Congregation for the Causes of Saints (CCS) titled him as a Servant of God and issued the nihil obstat ("no objections") which would allow for the Brindisi-Ostuni archdiocese to open the investigation. The diocesan process was opened on 19 September 2016 and concluded some months later on 24 April 2017; the CCS validated this process on 22 September 2017. The postulators submitted the positio to the CCS officials in mid-2018 for evaluation. The postulator for this cause is Francesca Consolini.

The Brindisi-Ostuni Archdiocese investigated a miracle attributed to Farina's intercession from 7 November 2018 until 21 March 2019 with all the relevant interrogatories and medical evidence presented to the CCS following that investigation.
