= Benigna Victim of Jesus =

Brazilian religious sister and Venerable

Venerable Benigna Victim of Jesus CIANSP
- Born: 16 August 1907; Diamantina, Brazil
- Died: 16 October 1981 (aged 74); Belo Horizonte, Brazil

Maria da Conceição Santos, CIANSP (religious name: Benigna Victim of Jesus; 16 August 1907 — 16 October 1981) was an Afro-Brazilian religious sister of the Congregation of Auxiliaries of Our Lady of Piety.

On October 15, 2011, her beatification cause was opened by the Archdiocese of Belo Horizonte. On February 18, 2022, Pope Francis declared her venerable.

== Life ==
=== Early years ===
Santos was born on August 16, 1907, in the mining town of Diamantina, and registered as Maria da Conceição Santos. She received a Catholic religious education from her parents as a child. Even as a little girl, she revealed divine gifts and manifested a vocation for religious life. She participated in celebrations of Holy Mass, coronations, processions and prayers of the rosary. In her homeland, Maria went to primary school and learned to play various musical instruments. As a catechist and guitar teacher, she evangelized children and adults.

=== Religious life ===
On February 11, 1935, a day dedicated to Our Lady of Lourdes, Maria joined the Congregation of the Auxiliary Sisters of Our Lady of Piety. On March 19, 1936, Saint Joseph's Day, she made her first vows and took the religious name Benigna Victim of Jesus.

Benigna began her apostolate by providing religious services in the places designated by the congregation. The Manoel Gonçalves de Souza Moreira Charity House, in Itaúna, was the first place where she worked. There, she took perpetual vows on January 6, 1941, and graduated from nursing. On January 1, 1943, she was appointed Mother Superior, thus assuming the direction of this house. In his new position, she founded a maternity hospital that assisted needy mothers.

Benigna suffered slander, such as rumors of a possible pregnancy and the accusation of being a communist nun, and was therefore in 1948 transferred in a police car to Asilo São Luiz, in Serra da Piedade, in Caeté, where she learned of the demolition of the maternity in Itaúna.

In Serra da Piedade, Sister Benigna was placed in a sty, thus acquiring various diseases. She was visited there by her friend, doctor José Nogueira, who realized the extreme fragility of her health. Fearing the worst, he communicated this to the director of the house, telling him that the congregation would be held responsible if something happened to her.

In 1950, Benigna was assigned to provide services as a midwife and nurse in an asylum hospital in the city of Lambari. In 1955, she went to Our Lady of Lourdes College, in Lavras. To the students of the school, she taught piety, faith, and devotion to Our Lady. It was common to find distressed students asking Sister Benigna for prayers to do well in the exams. In honor of Our Lady of Lourdes, Sister Benigna built a cave that was destroyed, shortly after her transfer to the city of Sabará. In this city, in the year 1960, Sister Benigna worked at the Holy House of Mercy.

In 1963, Benigna returned to provide her services at Asilo São Luiz, remaining there until 1966, when she was called to help rebuild the Lar Augusto Silva, in Lavras. Benigna lived in this house for the last sixteen years of her life. She was always sought after by people from all walks of life. She had great friends in Belo Horizonte, Lavras, and other regions of Minas Gerais, who always had her in difficult moments. When food was missing from the asylum, she called these friends and it was soon taken care of.

On June 30, 1977, in recognition of the work done to the community of Lavras, the city council by unanimous vote conferred Benigna the title of honorary citizen.

On August 16, 1980, Benigna, with the help of her friends, inaugurated the Chapel of St. Joseph, allowing Eucharistic celebrations to be held for the elderly of the asylum in a nearby place. On August 16, 1981, in honor of Our Lady of Lourdes, she inaugurated a beautiful grotto, in front of the Chapel of St. Joseph.

=== Illness and death ===
On the night of October 12 of the same year, Benigna was admitted to the urgent care center of Prontocor Hospital, in Belo Horizonte, with severe chest pains. A pacemaker was placed in an attempt to save her life. Even though her health was very poor, she prayed with everyone who sought her. On October 16, 1981, Benigna died.

== Devotion ==
Benigna, even after her death, remains a popular figure. Her name elevates and praises the Congregation of the Auxiliary Sisters of Our Lady of Piety. Thousands of devotees continue to ask for her intercession because of the countless miracles attributed to her.

Every Monday, at 14 hours, the faithful gathered in prayer in his tomb, in the Cemetery of Bonfim, where Holy Mass was celebrated and prayed, then the Novena of Our Lady of the Rosary of Pompeii. After the transfer of the remains of the religious to the Novitiate Our Lady of Piety, both The Holy Mass and the Novena were transferred to the Sanctuary of Our Lady of Conception, in the Lagoinha neighborhood, where devout members, keeping the same day and time, continue to gather in prayer, in the desire that, soon, she is revered in churches of Brazil and the world.
