= Zacarias of Saint Teresa =

Spanish Discalced Carmelite

Venerable Zacarias of Saint Teresa OCD
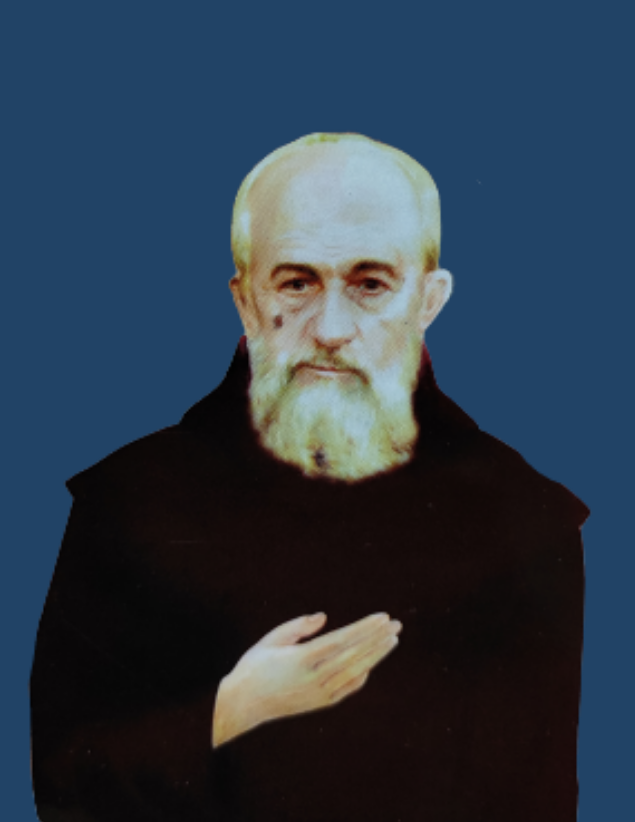
- Born: Zacarías Salterain-Bizkarra; 5 November 1887; Abadiano, Vizcaya, Spain
- Died: 23 May 1957 (aged 69); Christian Medical College & Hospital, Vellore, India

Zacarías of Saint Teresa (1887–1957), born as Zacarías Salterain-Bizkarra, was a Discalced Carmelite priest.

== Life ==
Salterain-Bizkarra was born on 5 November 1887 in Abadiño, Spain, to Bartholomew and Venancia Salterain-Bizkarra. In 1904, he made his religious vows at the Discalced Carmelite convent of Larrea. He was ordained a priest in Rome on 14 September 1912 and was sent as a missionary to India the same year, where he worked until his death on 28 May 1957 at the Christian Medical College Hospital in Vellore. Zacarias of Saint Teresa was buried in Mangalappuzha. On 8 June 2000, his mortal remains were translated to the Immaculate Conception Church in Manjummel.

He was declared venerable on 27 January 2014 by Pope Francis.
