= Rafaél Manuel Almansa Riaño =

Colombian Franciscan (1840–1927)

Venerable Rafaél Manuel Almansa Riaño OFM
- Born: 2 August 1840; Bogotá, Colombia
- Died: 28 June 1927 (aged 86); Bogotá, Colombia

Rafaél Manuel Almansa Riaño (2 August 1840 – 28 June 1927) was a Colombian religious priest of the Order of Friars Minor. Riaño dedicated his pastoral career to the care of the poor and to the administering of the sacraments in the parishes and communities that he served in. He faced initial persecution due to anti-Christian sentiment but gained a formidable reputation as a saint once he managed to resume his duties as a priest.

He was declared to be venerable in 2016 once Pope Francis signed a decree that certified Riaño's life of heroic virtue.

== Life ==
Riaño was born in Bogotá on 2 August 1840 to Ambrosio Riaño and María del Rosario. He was baptized in the church of Las Nieves on 3 August.

He commenced his studies for the priesthood in 1853 at the convent of Saint Francis in Columbia, where he made his religious vows in 1865. He was forced to suspend his studies in 1861 after President Tomás Cipriano de Mosquera expropriated the lands of the church in the nation. Once that all passed he was at last ordained as a priest on 27 May 1866 which he received from the Bishop of Nueva Pamplona, Bonifacio Antonio Toscano.

Riaño was appointed as the parish priest for Cúcuta and was transferred as the coadjutor to Bucaramanga following the 1875 earthquake. In 1881 he joined the Order of Friars Minor and was appointed as its chaplain in the church of Saint Francis at Bogotá. In 1895 he travelled to Rome for the General Chapter of the order and met with Pope Leo XIII. On 18 December 1897 the Archbishop of Bogotá, Bernardo Herrera Restrepo, made him the chaplain of the church of San Diego and he remained in that position until his death. Riaño aided the poor of his parishes and made the effort to spread the love of Jesus Christ to all his flock; he was known for his peacemaking and mediation in times of turmoil while known for his simple and austere methods of living. He also had a liking for the sacrament of Reconciliation despite his love for administering all sacraments. He was said to have slept on a bed made of stones with no pillow or blanket.

He died on 28 June 1927; around 100 000 were reported to have attended his wake and funeral.

== Beatification process ==
His beatification process began in 1995, when the Congregation for the Causes of Saints granted the nihil obstat ("nothing against") to the cause on 27 October, in a simultaneous act that conferred upon Almansa Riaño the title of a Servant of God. By 1999 it was entrusted to the general postulator of the Order of the Friors Minor, Giovangiuseppe Califano. Riaño was proclaimed to be venerable on 9 May 2016.
