= Pelágio Sauter =

German Roman Catholic priest

Venerable Pelágio Sauter CSsR
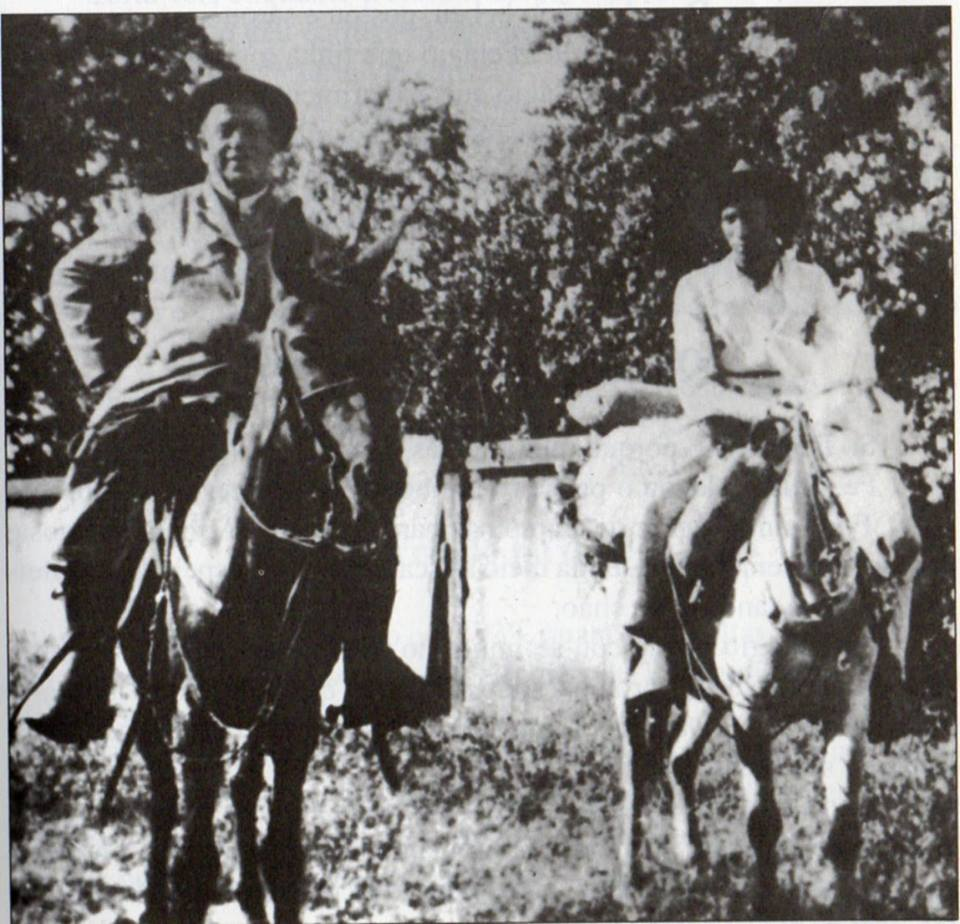
- Sauter (left) in 1900 with his friend Hermínio
- Born: 9 November 1878; Hausen am Tann, German Empire
- Died: 23 November 1961 (aged 83); Goiânia, Brazil

Pelágio Sauter (9 November 1878 – 23 November 1961) was a German religious priest of the Redemptorists who worked in the missions of Brazil. He served in the Brazilian missions from 1909 until his death, never returning to his homeland. He was dedicated to the needs of the ill and poor and often visited hundreds of villages on horseback. His care of the sick intensified in the last decade of his life; he contracted his final illness (which led to his death) while visiting an ill person.

His beatification process commenced after his death, leading to the declaration of his life of heroic virtue in 2014. This conferred the title of a Venerable upon him. Amiracle attributed to the intercession of Sauter is under investigation.

== Life ==
Pelágio Sauter was born on 9 November 1878 in Hausen am Tann as one of fifteen children to Mattis Sauter (a local schoolteacher) and Marta Neher. His brother Gaspar later became a Redemptorist priest and his mother often volunteered at their local parish.

In 1892 he received both his First Communion and Confirmation and then worked for a brief period as an apprentice locksmith.

He commenced his studies for the priesthood at the Redemptorist's seminary in Bachham in 1894. Sauter was also educated in Austria as a student of Blessed Stanggassinger and finished high school back in his homeland. He became a member of the Redemptorist religious congregation and made his solemn religious profession on 8 September 1902 at Gars am Inn. He received his ordination to the priesthood on 16 June 1907 in Deggendorf from the Bishop of Regensburg.

He accepted an invitation to join the missions in Brazil and travelled there in 1909 to work in the missions for the remainder of his life. Sauter would never return to his homeland again. He arrived with four other priests in Rio de Janeiro on 6 August 1909. He spent his first decade in São Paulo where he worked in parishes and then moved to Goiás. He evangelized in small towns and reached them all on horseback. Sauter gained a formidable reputation as a father of the poor and a comforter of those who were ill. He devoted himself to the sick in the last decade of his life. His favorite apostolate was the itinerant mission in the abandoned areas of the region and often arrived on horseback in the hundreds of small towns that he visited. Sauter was also good at music and often taught music to others; he himself learned the violin and the harmonica and used these instruments in his apostolate.

He contracted pneumonia that led to his death in 1961 after he got a cold from staying too long in the rain while visiting an ill person. Sauter died at 1:00pm 23 November 1961 from pneumonia. Hundreds attended his 24 November funeral and a week of mourning was decreed. About 30,000 people attended his funeral.

== Beatification process ==
The beatification process commenced at the behest of the Brazilian people in Brazil with the declaration of "nihil obstat" (nothing against) on 20 October 1997 under Pope John Paul II. This conferred upon him the title of Servant of God and allowed for a local diocesan process to gather documentation and testimonies. The process spanned from 23 November 1997 until 21 March 1998 and was ratified in 2003 for the cause to proceed to the next phase.

The Positio - an account of his life and a compilation of documentation - was forwarded to the Congregation for the Causes of Saints in 2005 for further evaluation. Pope Francis approved that he had lived a life of heroic virtue and declared him to be Venerable on 7 November 2014.

The miracle required for his beatification was investigated in a diocesan tribunal and was granted formal ratification on 29 October 2010.
