= Odette Vidal Oliveira =

Brazilian Catholic venerable

Venerable Odette Vidal de Oliveira
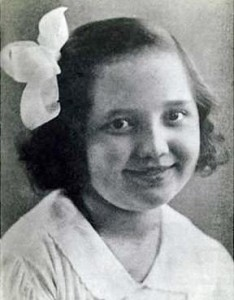
- Born: September 15, 1930; Rio de Janeiro, Brazil
- Died: November 25, 1939 (aged 9); Rio de Janeiro, Brazil

Odette Vidal de Oliveira, born Odette Vidal Cardoso (15 September 1930 – 25 November 1939), was a Brazilian girl who is being considered for beatification by the Roman Catholic Church.

== History ==
Odette was born to Augusto Cardoso Ferreira and Alice Vidal, who were both Portuguese immigrants. Her father died before her birth and her mother remarried to a wealthy merchant, Francisco de Oliveira, who raised her as his own child. Although she had a privileged upbringing, the girl showed a special concern for the poor, visiting orphanages with her mother and asking household staff to give to the poor and needy. From the time she was four, she purportedly had intimate dialogues with Jesus Christ. She often accompanied her mother to church.

At the age of five she began to attend catechism classes at the College of the Immaculate Conception.

She loved lilies, prayed the rosary daily and thought that Saint Joseph did not receive enough honor for his support of Mary and Jesus. Odette died of meningitis at the age of nine. After her death, her parents devoted themselves to good works that were inspired by Odette's love for the poor.

== Beatification process ==
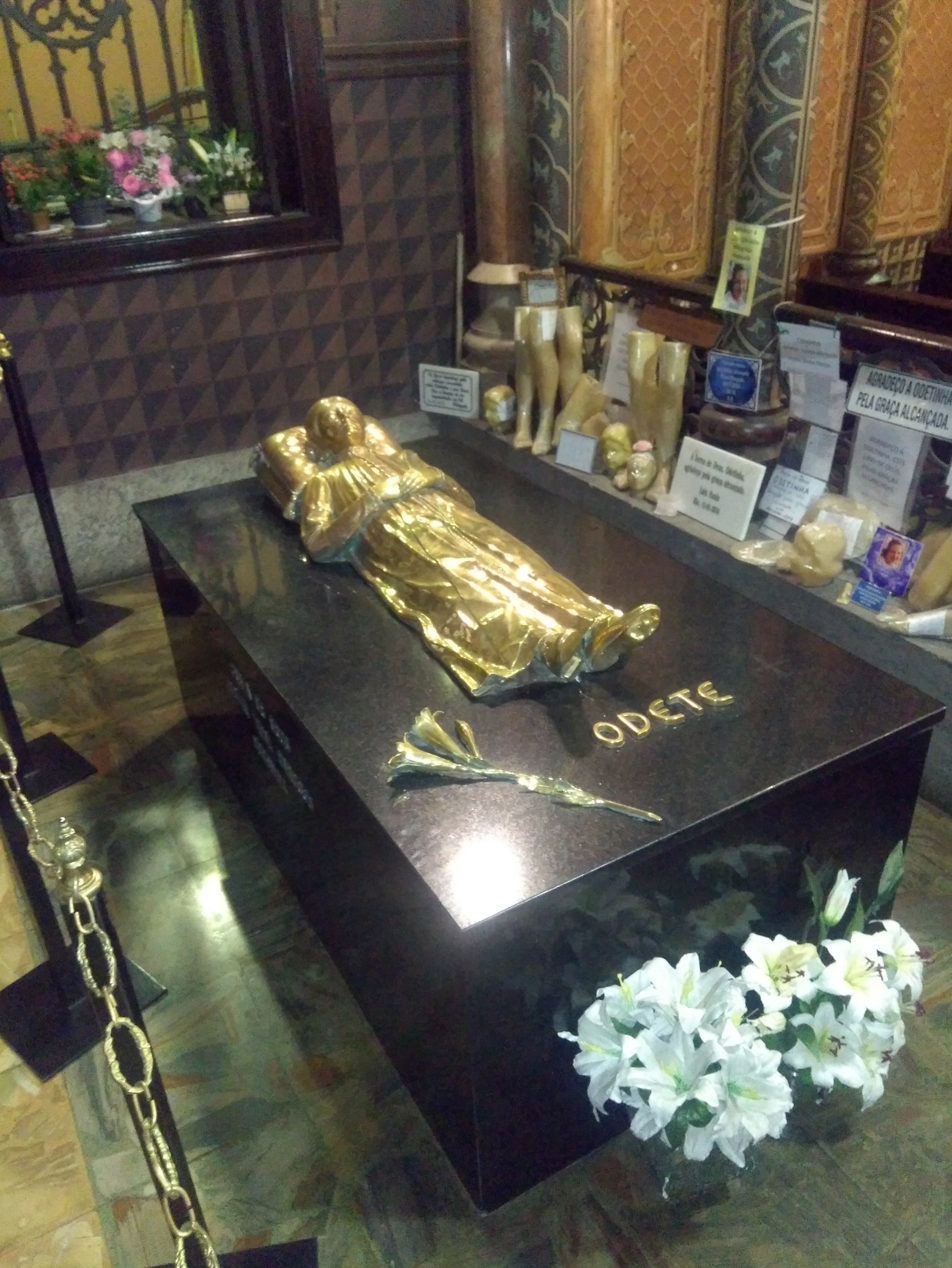
Tomb of venerable Odetinha in the Basilica of the Immaculate Conception, Botafogo, Rio de Janeiro

The Roman Catholic diocese in Rio de Janeiro, Brazil, is seeking to have the girl beatified. Since her death, one miracle has been attributed to the girl's intervention. A woman hemorrhaged after giving birth and her family was told she would die. The woman prayed to the child for help and recovered. One miracle is needed for beatification in the Roman Catholic Church and two are needed to declare someone a saint. On November 25, 2021, during an audience granted to the Prefect of the Congregation for the Causes of Saints, Pope Francis authorised the promulgation of the decree recognising the heroic virtue of Odette Vidal de Oliveira.
