= Francesca Lancellotti =

Italian laywoman declared venerable (1917–2008)

Venerable Francesca Lancellotti
- Born: 7 July 1917; Oppido Lucano, Potenza, Italy
- Died: 4 September 2008 (aged 91); Rome, Italy

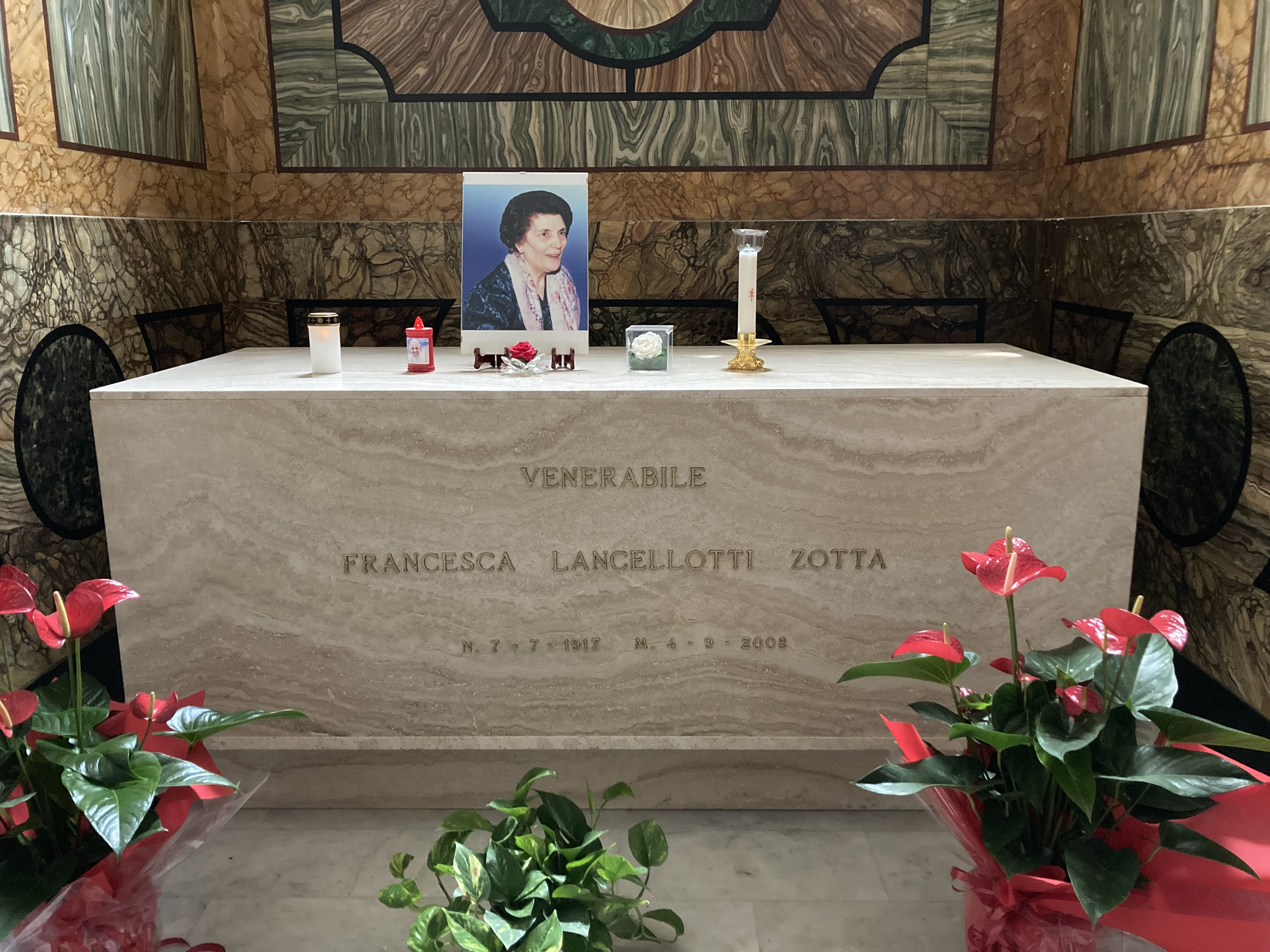
Grave in Santa Maria ai Monti in Rome

Venerable Francesca Lancellotti Zotta (7 July 1917 – 4 September 2008) was an Italian laywoman known for her faithfulness and generosity to the poor. Pope Francis declared Lancellotti a Servant of God in 2015. He later declared her venerable in 2023.

== Biography ==
Francesca Lancellotti was born on 7 July 1917 in Oppido Lucano, Potenza. She was baptized on 15 August, confirmed on 3 June 1921, and in 1925, received the Eucharist for the first time. Lancellotti attended school until the second grade, dropping out to work in the fields.

Since a young age, Lancellotti was very devout in prayer, frequently visiting the shrine of Our Lady of Purity at the Sanctuary of Belvedere nearby. She wanted to become a nun, but her father persuaded her to get married instead. Lancellotti eventually married Faustino Zotta, a farmer and saddler, on 10 October 1938 after three years of engagement. They had two children together.

Lancellotti and her husband started a small business selling tobacco, liquor, and groceries in 1939. She continued being prayerful, opening her house to the needy, and on 7 July 1956, allegedly had a private revelation of the archangel Michael urging her to go to Rome with her family. This caused the couple to sell their business and move in 1960, opening a house for the poor and those needing spiritual assistance. Before settling down on the Via del Seminario, they lived in the Primavalle quartiere and near the Pantheon.

Following Faustino's death on 24 November 1987, Lancellotti moved in with her daughter on the Via Cavour, Rome. She had colon surgery in 2002 and was unable to leave the house for the rest of her life because of it. She died on 4 September 2008, at the San Giovanni Addolorata Hospital. After her funeral at Santo Spirito in Sassia, Lancellotti was originally buried at the Cimitero Flaminio, but she was subsequently moved to Santa Maria ai Monti on 7 July 2021. Her case of beatification and canonization was opened on 16 June 2016 and closed on 17 January 2020, under Cardinal Vicar Angelo De Donatis.
