= Maria Dulce Rodrigues dos Santos =

Brazilian religious sister

Venerable Maria Teresa of the Eucharistic Jesus
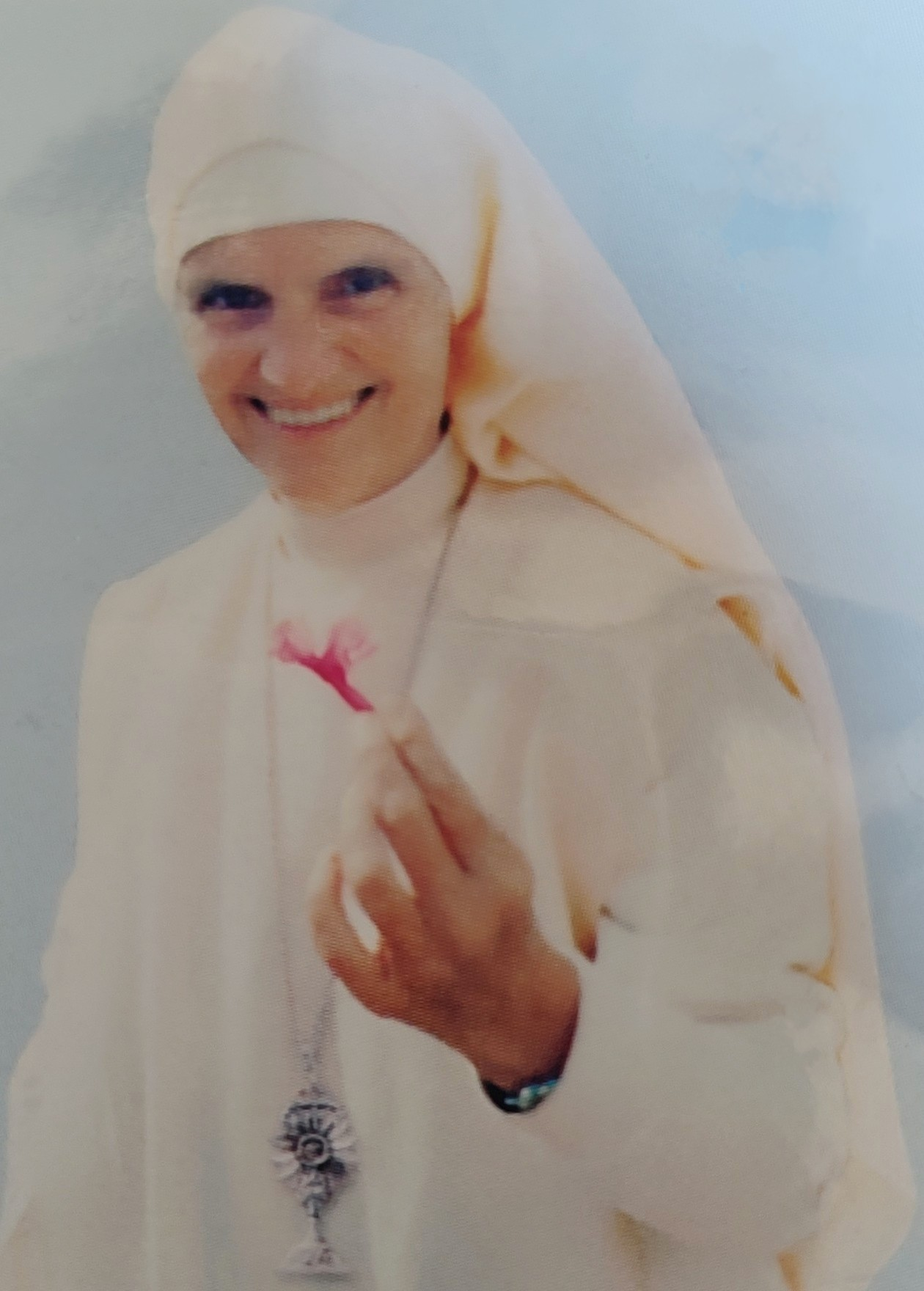
- Born: 20 January 1901; São Paulo, Brazil
- Died: 8 January 1972 (aged 70); São José dos Campos, São Paulo, Brazil

Maria Dulce Rodrigues dos Santos (religious name Maria Teresa of the Eucharistic Jesus; 20 January 1901 – 8 January 1972) was a Brazilian religious sister and the founder of the Little Missionary Sisters of Mary Immaculate.

Pope Francis recognized her life of heroic virtue and proclaimed her to be venerable on 3 April 2014.

== Life ==
Maria Dulce Rodrigues dos Santos was born in 1901 in Brazil. She decided to consecrate herself to God and became a religious sister. She assumed the name Maria Teresa of the Eucharistic Jesus after admittance to the novitiate.

She established the Little Missionary Sisters of Mary Immaculate with a focus on the Blessed Virgin Mary while catering to the needs of those who were underprivileged, ailing and poor.

She died in 1972.

== Beatification process ==
In 1997, the beatification process was introduced in Brazil with the declaration of nihil obstat ("nothing against") and it bestowed upon her the title of a Servant of God. Pope Francis recognized her life of heroic virtue and conferred on her the title of a Venerable on 3 April 2014.
