= List of people declared venerable by Pope Benedict XVI =

Pope Benedict XVI declared 181 individuals venerable, based on the recognition of their heroic virtues from 2005 to 2013, of whom 62 would be beatified.

== 2005 ==
=== December 19, 2005 ===
1. Camilla Battista da Varano (1458–1524) (cultus confirmed on 7 April 1843, canonized on 17 October 2010)
2. Carlo Bascapè (1550–1615)
3. Isabela de Rosis (1842–1911)
4. Joseph Kugler (1867–1946) (beatified on 4 October 2009)
5. María Josefa Segovia Morón (1891–1957)
6. Massimo Rinaldi (1869–1941)
7. Paul Joseph Nardini (1821–1862) (beatified on 22 October 2006)
8. Szymon of Lipnica (1435–1482) (cultus confirmed on 24 February 1685, canonized on 3 June 2007)

== 2006 ==
=== April 28, 2006 ===
1. Caterina Coromina i Agustí (1824–1893)
2. Ciriaco María Sancha y Hervás (1833–1909) (beatified on 18 October 2009)
3. Dolores Márquez Romero (1817–1904)
4. Esperança González i Puig (1823–1885)
5. Giuseppina Nicoli (1863–1924) (beatified on 3 February 2008)
6. Vincenza Maria Poloni (1802–1855) (beatified on 21 September 2008, canonized on 19 October 2025)
7. Rosa Flesch (1826–1906) (beatified on 4 May 2008)
8. Maria Matilde Bucchi (1812–1882)

=== June 26, 2006 ===
1. Antonio Rosmini-Serbati (1797–1855) (beatified on 18 November 2007)
2. Francesco Pianzola (1881–1943) (beatified on 4 October 2008)
3. Hieronymus Jaegen (1841–1919)
4. Louise-Marguerite Claret de la Touche (1868–1915)
5. Marco Morelli (1834–1912)
6. Regina Lete Landa (1913–1941)
7. Wanda Malczewska (1822–1896)

=== November 15, 2006 ===
1. Margherita Occhiena (1788–1856)

=== December 16, 2006 ===
1. José Olallo Valdés (1820–1889) (beatified on 29 November 2008)
2. Kaszap István (1916–1935)
3. Mamerto de la Ascensión Esquiú (1826–1883) (beatified on 4 September 2021)
4. Salvatore Micalizzi (1856–1937)

== 2007 ==
=== June 1, 2007 ===
1. Alcide-Vital Lataste (1832–1869) (beatified on 3 June 2012)
2. Armida Barelli (1882–1952) (beatified on 30 April 2022)
3. Cleonilde Guerra (1922–1949)
4. Eleonore Margarete Weiss (1882–1923)
5. Francesco Maria Perez (1861–1937)
6. Giovanni Battista Arista (1863–1920)
7. Luigia Lavizzari (1867–1931)

=== July 6, 2007 ===
1. Emilie Schneider (1820–1859)
2. Emmanuela Giovanna Scribano (1917–1968)
3. Hildegard Burjan (1883–1933) (beatified on 29 January 2012)
4. Ignacia del Espíritu Santo (1663–1748)
5. Jérôme le Royer de la Dauversière (1597–1659)
6. Leopoldina Naudet (1773–1834) (beatified on 29 April 2017)
7. Luca Passi (1789–1866) (beatified on 13 April 2013)
8. Marcantonio Barbarigo (1640–1706)

=== December 17, 2007 ===
1. Anna Maria Marovich (1815-1887)
2. Antonietta Meo (1930–1937)
3. Francesco Mottola (1901–1969) (beatified on 10 October 2021)
4. Manuel Lozano Garrido (1920–1971) (beatified on 12 June 2010)
5. Maria Pierina (1890–1945) (beatified on 30 May 2010)
6. Raphaël Rafiringa (1856–1919) (beatified on 7 June 2009)
7. Serafino Morazzone (1747–1822) (beatified on 26 June 2011)
8. Stephen Nehmé (1889–1938) (beatified on 27 June 2010)

== 2008 ==
=== March 15, 2008 ===
1. Anna Osti (1895–1958
2. Aurelio Bacciarini (1873–1935)
3. Clement Vismara (1897–1988) (beatified on 26 June 2011)
4. Eufemia Gemma Giannini (1884–1971)
5. Giocondo Pio Lorgna (1870–1928)
6. Joaquim Alves Brás (1889–1966)
7. Leopold of Alpandeire (1866–1956) (beatified on 12 September 2010)
8. Luigia Mazzotta (1900–1922)
9. Margalida Amengual i Campaner (1888–1919)
10. Michaelangelo Longo (1812–1886)
11. Michael J. McGivney (1852–1890) (beatified on 31 October 2020)
12. Paolo Roasenda (1906–1972)
13. Pietro Riminucci (1875–1960)
14. Victoriano Gondra Muruaga (1910–1974)

=== July 3, 2008 ===
1. Chiara Badano (1971–1990) (beatified on 25 September 2010)
2. Estephan El Douaihy (1630–1704) (beatified on 2 August 2024)
3. Francisco Garmendia Mendizábal (1880–1969)
4. Giuseppe Dal Vago (1822–1895)
5. Giuseppe Di Donna (1901–1952)
6. Barbara Maix (1818–1873) (beatified on 6 November 2010)
7. Nuno Álvares Pereira (1360–1431) (cultus confirmed on 23 January 1918, canonized on 26 April 2009)
8. Pius Keller (1825–1904)

=== November 12, 2008 ===
1. Maria Troncatti (1883–1969) (beatified on 24 November 2012, canonized on 19 October 2025)

=== December 6, 2008 ===
1. Giacinto Bianchi (1835–1914)
2. Jan van den Boer (1841–1917)
3. Maria Clara of the Child Jesus (1843–1899) (beatified on 21 May 2011)

=== December 22, 2008 ===
1. Josep Tous Soler (1811–1871) (beatified on 25 April 2010)

== 2009 ==
=== January 17, 2009 ===
1. Carolina Beltrami (1869–1932)
2. Juan de Palafox y Mendoza (1600–1659) (beatified on 5 June 2011)
3. Lliberada Ferrarons i Vives (1803–1842)
4. María de la Purísima Salvat Romero (1926–1998) (beatified on 18 September 2010, canonized on 18 October 2015)
5. Robert Spiske (1821–1888)

=== April 3, 2009 ===
1. Benoîte Rencurel (1647–1718)
2. Felisa Pérez de Iriarte Casado (1904–1954)
3. Franz-Josef Rudigier (1811–1884)
4. Giacomo Gaglione (1896–1962)
5. Giuseppe Marcinò (1589–1655)
6. Dulce de Souza Lopes Pontes (1914–1992) (beatified on 22 May 2011, canonized on 13 October 2019)
7. Johann Evangelist Wagner (1807–1886)
8. Manuela de Jesús Arias Espinosa (1904–1981) (beatified on 21 April 2012)
9. Marie de La Ferre (1590–1652)
10. Teresa Candamo Álvarez-Calderon (1875–1953)

=== July 3, 2009 ===
1. Anna Maria Janer Anglarill (1800–1885) (beatified on 8 October 2011)
2. Clotilde Micheli (1849–1911) (beatified on 28 May 2011)
3. Engelmar Unzeitig (1911–1945) (beatified on 24 September 2016)
4. Teresa Manganiello (1849–1876) (beatified on 22 May 2010)

=== December 19, 2009 ===
1. Antonia Maria Verna (1773–1838) (beatified on 2 October 2011)
2. Enrichetta Alfieri (1891–1951) (beatified on 26 June 2011)
3. Francesca Farolfi (1853–1917)
4. Giunio Tinarelli (1912–1956)
5. Giuseppe Quadrio (1921–1963)
6. Jakov Varingez (1400–1496) (cultus confirmed on 29 September 1700)
7. Louis Brisson (1817–1908) (beatified on 22 September 2012)
8. Joan Mary Ward (1585–1645)
9. Pope Pius XII (1876–1958)
10. Pope John Paul II (1920–2005) (beatified on 1 May 2011, canonized on 27 April 2014)

== 2010 ==
=== March 27, 2010 ===
1. Franziska Streitel (1844–1911)
2. Francesco Antonio Marcucci (1717–1798)
3. Henriette DeLille (1813–1862)
4. Luigi Novarese (1914–1984) (beatified on 11 May 2013)
5. Janez Frančišek Gnidovec (1873–1939)
6. María Guggiari Echeverría (1925–1959) (beatified on 23 June 2018)
7. Maria Theresia Bonzel (1830–1905) (beatified on 10 November 2013)

=== July 1, 2010 ===
1. Basilio Martinelli (1872–1962
2. Gertrude Prosperi (1799–1847) (beatified on 10 November 2012)
3. Lucia Cavallo (1913–1947)
4. Maria del Carmen Albarracín Pascual (1927–1946)
5. Maria Kaupas (1880–1940)
6. María Antonia de Paz y Figueroa (1730–1799) (beatified on 27 August 2016, canonized on 11 February 2024)

=== December 10, 2010 ===
1. Antonio Palladino (1881–1926)
2. Maria Elisa Andreoli (1861–1935)
3. María Pilar Solsona Lambán (1881–1966)
4. Selim Abu Mrad (1853–1930)

== 2011 ==
=== January 14, 2011 ===
1. Antonio Franco (1585–1626) (beatified on 2 September 2013)
2. Faustino Pérez-Manglano (1946–1963)
3. Francisca de Paula de Jesus a.k.a. "Nha Chica" (1810–1895) (beatified on 4 May 2013)
4. Franziskus Maria Jordan (1848–1918) (beatified on 15 May 2021)
5. Nelson Baker (1842–1936)

=== April 2, 2011 ===
1. Adolphe Chatillon (1871–1929)
2. Bernhard Lehner (1930–1944)
3. Irene Stefani (1891–1930) (beatified on 30 May 2015)
4. Libera Italia Maria Inglese (1866–1929)
5. Thomas Kurialacherry (1873–1925)
6. Vincenza Damato (1909–1948)

=== June 27, 2011 ===
1. Francesco Marinoni (1490–1562) (cultus confirmed on 5 December 1764)
2. José María García Lahiguera (1903–1989)
3. Laura Meozzi (1873–1951)
4. Luigia Tincani (1889–1976)
5. Matthew Kadalikattil (1872–1935)
6. Raffaele Dimiccoli (1887–1956)
7. Zeinab Alif (1845–1926)
8. Zofia Czeska (1584–1650) (beatified on 9 June 2013)

=== December 19, 2011 ===
1. Assunta Marchetti (1871–1948) (beatified on 25 October 2014)
2. Donato Giannotti (1828–1914)
3. Alphonse-Marie Eppinger (1814–1867) (beatified on 9 September 2018)
4. Małgorzata Szewczyk (1828–1905) (beatified on 9 June 2013)
5. Maria Julitta Ritz (1882–1966)
6. Marianna Amico Roxas (1883–1947)
7. Marie-Eugène de l'Enfant-Jésus (1894–1967) (beatified on 19 November 2016)

== 2012 ==
=== March 14, 2012 ===
1. Félix Varela (1788–1853)

=== May 10, 2012 ===
1. Baltasar Pardal Vidal (1886–1963)
2. Emilie Engel (1893–1955)
3. Frederic Baraga (1797–1868)
4. Jacques Sevin (1882–1951)
5. María Josefa Recio (1846–1883)
6. Maria Bolognesi (1924–1980) (beatified on 7 September 2013)
7. Francisco de Paula Victor (1827–1905) (beatified on 14 November 2015)
8. Pasquale Uva (1883–1955)
9. Rachelina Ambrosini (1925–1941)
10. Raffaello Delle Nocche (1877–1960)
11. Teresa Demjanovich (1901–1927) (beatified on 4 October 2014)

=== June 28, 2012 ===
1. Álvaro del Portillo (1914–1994) (beatified on 27 September 2014)
2. Bogner Etelka (1905–1933)
3. Cristobal of Saint Catherine (1638–1690) (beatified on 7 April 2013)
4. Fernanda Riva (1920–1956)
5. Fulton Sheen (1895–1979)
6. Louis Tijssen (1865–1929)
7. Marie-Josephte Fitzbach (1806–1885)
8. Mary Angeline Teresa McCrory (1893–1984)
9. Sisto Riario Sforza (1810–1877)

=== December 20, 2012 ===
1. Claudia Russo (1889–1964)
2. Francesco Saverio Petagna (1812–1878)
3. Giovannina Franks (1807–1872) (beatified on 20 September 2014)
4. Joaquina Maria Mercedes Barcelo Pages (1857–1940)
5. Juan José Jaime Bonal Cortada (1769–1829)
6. Louis-Marie Baudouin (1765–1835)
7. Ludwika Szczęsna (1863–1916) (beatified on 27 September 2015)
8. Luisa Aveledo (1874–1959)
9. Pope Paul VI (1897–1978) (beatified on 19 October 2014, canonized on 14 October 2018)
10. Rosa Elena Cornejo Pazmiño (1874–1964)

== See also ==
- List of people declared venerable by Pope John XXIII
- List of people declared venerable by Pope Paul VI
- List of people declared venerable by Pope John Paul II
- List of people declared venerable by Pope Francis
