= List of people declared venerable by Pope Leo XIV =

This article is a list of people that were proclaimed venerable, based on the recognition of their heroic virtue and offer of life, by Pope Leo XIV.

== 2025 ==
Venerable				Rescript of "nihil obstat"	Type of Cause	Ref.
No.	Details	Church status	Competent Forum	Rescript of "nihil obstat"	Type of Cause	Ref.
May 22
1.	Alejandro Labaka Ugarte (rel. name: Manuel de Beizama) (1920–1987)	Capuchin; Titular Bishop of Pomaria; Apostolic Vicar of Aguarico	Aguarico	4 July 1994	Offer of Life	
2.	Inés Arango Velásquez (rel. name: María Nieves of Medellín) (1937–1987)	Tertiary Capuchin Sister of the Holy Family	Aguarico	4 July 1994	Offer of Life	
3.	Matthew Makil [മാത്യു മാക്കീൽ] (1851–1914)	Titular Bishop of Tralles in Asia; Apostolic Vicar of Kottayam; Founder, Sisters of the Visitation of the Blessed Virgin Mary	Kottayam (Syro-Malabar)	11 November 2008	Heroic virtue	
June 20
4.	Anna Fulgida Bartolacelli (1928–1993)	Layman of the diocese of Modena-Nonatola; member of the Association of the Silent Workers of the Cross	Modena-Nonatola	15 December 2004	Heroic virtue	
5.	João Luiz Pozzobon (1904–1985)	Permanent deacon of the diocese of Santa Maria; married; member, Schönstatt Movement	Santa Maria	27 March 1995	Heroic virtue	
6.	Maria Olga Tambelli (rel. name: Teresa) (1884–1964)	Vincentine	Cagliari	8 July 2016	Heroic virtue	
7.	Raffaele Mennella (1877–1898)	Missionary of the Sacred Hearts of Jesus and Mary	Naples	5 June 1999	Heroic virtue	
October 24
8.	Angelo Angioni (1915–2008)	Diocesan priest of the Diocese of São José do Rio Preto; founder of the Missionary Institute of the Immaculate Heart of Mary	São José do Rio Preto	7 June 2015	Heroic virtue	
9.	José Merino Andrés (1905-1968)	Dominican	Palencia	23 April 2001	Heroic virtue	
10.	Leone Ramgnino (rel. name: Gioacchino of the Queen of Peace, [Nino]) (1890-1985)	Discalced Carmelite	Acqui	29 August 2012	Heroic virtue	
11.	María Quintero Malfaz (rel. name: María Evangelista) (1591-1648)	Cistercian	Toledo (Spain)	26 November 2012	Heroic virtue	
November 21
12.	Enrico Bartoletti (1916–1976)	archbishop of Lucca	Lucca	4 September 2007	Heroic virtue	
13.	Gaspare Goggi (1877-1908)	Religious priest of the Sons of Divine Providence (Orionists)	Alessandria	---	Heroic virtue	
14.	Mary Glowrey (rel. name: Mary of the Sacred Heart) (1887-1957)	Religious sister of the Society of Jesus, Mary and Joseph	Guntur	27 March 2013	Heroic virtue	
15.	Maria de Lourdes Guarda (1926-1996)	Laywoman of the Diocese of Jundiaí	Jundiaí	29 September 2007	Heroic virtue	
December 18
16.	Giuseppe Atonna (rel. name: Berado of the Heart of Jesus) (1843–1917)	Franciscan	Naples	---	Heroic virtue	
17.	Joseph Panjikaran (1888–1949)	Diocesan priest; Founder of the Congrgation of the Medical Sisters of Saint Joseph	Kothamangalam	20 August 2010	Heroic virtue	
18.	Teresa Solari (rel. name: Domenica Caterina of the Holy Spirit) (1822–1908)	Founder, Congregation of the Dominican Sisters of the Little House of Divine Providence	Genoa	10 September 1999	Heroic virtue	

== 2026 ==
Venerable				Rescript of "nihil obstat"	Type of Cause	Ref.
No.	Details	Church status	Competent Forum	Rescript of "nihil obstat"	Type of Cause	Ref.
January 22
1.	Maria Giselda Villela (Maria Imaculada of the Holy Trinity) [Mãezinha] (1909–1988)	Discalced Carmelite	Pouso Alegre	11 July 2006	Heroic virtue	
2.	Nerino Cobianchi (1945–1998)	Layman of the diocese of Vigevano; married	Vigevano	14 January 2020	Heroic virtue	
3.	Tecla Relucenti (rel. name: Tecla Maria of the Immaculate Conception) (1704–1769)	Founder, Pious Workers Sisters of the Immaculate Conception	Ascoli Piceno	---	Heroic virtue	
4.	Teresa Militerni (rel. name: Crocifissa) (1874–1925)	Religious sister of the Sisters of Saint John the Baptist	San Marco Argentano-Scalea	16 October 2014	Heroic virtue	
February 21
5.	Fausto Gei (1927–1968)	Layman of the diocese of Brescia; member of the Silent Workers of the Cross	Brescia	30 September 2005	Heroic virtue	
6.	Francesco Lombardi (1851–1922)	Diocesan priest of the Diocese of Ventimiglia-San Remo	Ventimiglia-San Remo	11 November 1983	Heroic virtue	
7.	Michael Koodalloor (rel. name: Theophane) (1913–1968)	Capuchin	Verapoly	11 May 2007	Heroic virtue	
March 23
8.	Lodovico Altieri (1805–1867)	Bishop of Albano; cardinal	Albano	14 March 2009	Offer of Life	
9.	Edward J. Flanagan (1886–1948)	Diocesan priest of the Archdiocese of Omaha	Omaha	17 March 2012	Heroic virtue	
10.	Henri Caffarel (1903–1996)	Diocesan priest of the Archdiocese of Paris; founder, Teams of Our Lady and Secular Institute of the Fraternity of Our Lady of the Resurrection	Paris	15 October 2005	Heroic virtue	
11.	Barbara Samulowska (rel. name: Stanisława) (1865–1950)	Vincentine	Warmia	22 September 2004	Heroic virtue	
12.	María Dolores Romero Algarín (rel. name: María Del Belén of the Heart of Jesus) (1916–1977)	Religious sister of the Handmaids of the Divine Heart	Seville	March 2013	Heroic virtue	
13.	Giuseppe Castagnetti (1909–1965)	Layman of the Diocese of Modena-Nonantola;	Modena-Nonantola	25 September 2009	Heroic virtue	
April 27
14.	Caterina Tramazzoli (rel. name: Maria Eletta of Jesus) (1605–1663)	Discalced Carmelite	Terni-Narni-Amelia	8 January 2003	Heroic virtue	
15.	Theresia Ijsseldijk (rel. name: Theresia of the Most Holy Trinity) (1897–1926)	Religious sister of the Carmelite Sisters of the Divine Heart of Jesus	Roermond	2010	Heroic virtue	
16.	Maria de Giovanna (rel. name: Maria Raffaella) (1870–1933)	Founder of the Minim Sisters of Saint Francis da Paola	Genoa	11 December 2012	Heroic virtue	
17.	Pedro Manuel Salado de Alba (1968–2012)	Religious brother of the Ecclesial Family "Hogar de Nazaret"	Córdoba	2018	Offer of Life	
May 22
18.	Constantine Vendrame (1893–1957)	Religious priest of the Society of Saint Francis de Sales (Salesians of Don Bosco)	Shillong	16 September 2006	Heroic virtue	
19.	Giovanni Zucca (rel. name: Nazareno from Pula) (1911–1992)	Friar Minor Capuchin	Cagliari	27 November 2003	Heroic virtue	
20.	María de la Concepción Cruz Echezarreta (rel. name: María Ana) (1912–1998)	Conceptionist nun	Madrid	29 October 2007	Heroic virtue	
21.	Jean-Thierry Ebogo (rel. name: Jean-Thierry of the Child Jesus and the Passion) (1982–2006)	Discalced Carmelite	Milan	2013	Heroic virtue	
June 18
22.	Julius Aemilius Albertus de Lombaerde (rel. name: Júlio Maria) (1878–1944)	Religious priest of the Congregation of the Missionaries of the Holy Family and founder of the Congregation of the Daughters of the Immaculate Heart of Mary, Congregation of the Missionaries of Our Lady of the Blessed Sacrament; Congregation of the Sisters of Our Lady of the Blessed Sacrament	Caratinga	3 January 2014	Heroic virtue	
23.	Julia Teresa Tallon (rel. name: Mary Teresa) (1867–1954)	Founder of the Congregation of the Parish Visitors of Mary Immaculate	New York	28 February 2013	Heroic virtue	
24.	Maria Agnese Tribbioli (1879–1965)	Founder of the Congregation of the Pious Workers Sisters of St. Joseph	Florence	---	Heroic virtue	
25.	Bàrbara Onofria Andreu Malferit (rel. name: Clara) (1596–1628)	Professed member of the Order of Saint Jerome	Mallorca	10 July 1984	Heroic virtue	
26.	Maria Petra Giordano (1912–2006)	Professed member of the Order of Preachers	Arezzo-Cortona-Sansepolcro	2014	Heroic virtue	
October 24
27.	Oreste Marengo (1906–1998)	Professed priest of the Society of Saint Francis de Sales (Salesians of Don Bosco); titular archbishop of Arsacal, and former apostolic administrator of Tura	Tura	9 July 2007	Heroic virtue	
28.	Friedrich Kaiser Depel (1903–1993)	Professed priest of the Congregation of the Missionaries of the Sacred Heart; first prelate of territorial prelature of Caravelí; titular bishop of Berrhoea; founder of the Congregation of the Missionaries of Jesus, Word and Victim	Lima	27 June 2018	Heroic virtue	
29.	Domenico Pogliani (1838–1921)	Priest of the archdiocese of Milan and founder of the Holy Family Institute	Milan	14 December 2002	Heroic virtue	
30.	Alessandro Vitetti (1915–1995)	Priest of the archdiocese of Rossano-Cariati	Rossano-Cariati	19 December 2007	Heroic virtue	
31.	Michele Natale (rel. name: Daniele from San Giovanni Rotondo) (1914–1994)	Professed religious of the Order of Friars Minor Capuchin	Manfredonia–Vieste–San Giovanni Rotondo	2013	Heroic virtue	
32.	Margarita Bavosi [Luminosa] (1941–1985)	Layperson of the archdiocese of Madrid and consecrated member of the Work of Mary (Focolare Movement)	Madrid	23 December 2004	Heroic virtue	
November 21
33.	Angelo Lolli (1880–1958)	priest of the archdiocese of Ravenna; founder of the Work of Saint Therese of the Child Jesus and of the Congregation of the Sisters of the Little Family of Saint Therese of the Child Jesus	Ravenna-Cervia	27 April 2000	Heroic virtue	
34.	Abundio García Román (1906–1989)	priest of the archdiocese of Madrid; founder of the Fraternities of Labor (“Hermandades del Trabajo”) and of the Public Association of the Missionaries of Labor (“Misioneros del Trabajo” and “Misioneras del Trabajo”)	Madrid	22 February 2000	Heroic virtue	
35.	Giulia Gabrieli (1997–2011)	child of the diocese of Bergamo	Bergamo	2019	Heroic virtue	

== See also ==
- List of people declared venerable by Pope John XXIII
- List of people declared venerable by Pope Paul VI
- List of people declared venerable by Pope John Paul II
- List of people declared venerable by Pope Benedict XVI
- List of people declared venerable by Pope Francis
