= List of people declared venerable by Pope John Paul II =

Pope John Paul II declared 523 individuals venerable, based on the recognition of their heroic virtues from 1978 to 2005.

== 1978 ==
=== December 1, 1978 ===
1. August Czartoryski (1858–1893)
2. Josephine Bakhita (1869–1947)
3. Leonie Aviat (1844–1914)

== 1979 ==
=== May 10, 1979 ===
1. Charles of Mount Argus (1821–1893)
2. Viktrizius Weiss (1842–1924)

=== July 13, 1979 ===
1. Jeanne Jugan (1792–1879)
2. Marie Rose Durocher (1811–1849)

== 1980 ==
=== April 29, 1980 ===
1. Brigida Morello Zancano (1610–1679)
2. Joseph Amand Passerat (1772–1858)
3. Franciszka Siedliska (1842–1902)

=== October 11, 1980 ===
1. Domingo Iturrate (1901–1927)
2. Raphael Kalinowski (1835–1907)

== 1981 ==
=== January 31, 1981 ===
1. Marie-Léonie Paradis (1840–1912)
2. Pedro Urocca (1583–1657)

=== March 30, 1981 ===
1. María Catalina Irigoyen Echegaray (1848–1918)

=== May 4, 1981 ===
1. Maria Gabriella Sagheddu (1914–1939)

=== November 27, 1981 ===
1. Galileo Nicolini (1882–1897)
2. Luigi Balbiano (1812–1884)
3. Mariam Baouardy (1846–1878)
4. Mercedes de Jesús Molina (1828–1883)
5. Rafael Guízar Valencia (1878–1938)

== 1982 ==
=== February 11, 1982 ===
1. Celine Borzecka (1833–1913)
2. Francisco Gárate Aranguren (1857–1929)
3. Guido Maria Conforti (1865–1931)
4. Maria Clotilde Adelaide Saveria di Borbone (1759–1802)
5. Rafqa Pietra Choboq Ar-Rayès (1832–1914)

=== April 2, 1982 ===
1. Angela Truszkowska (1825–1899)
2. Gesualdo Melacrino (1725–1803)
3. Giacomo Cusmano (1834–1888)

=== May 11, 1982 ===
1. Benedict Menni (1841–1912)
2. Jurgis Matulaitis-Matulevičius (1871–1927)

=== July 12, 1982 ===
1. Elizabeth of the Trinity (1880–1906)
2. Isidore De Loor (1881–1916)
3. Josep Manyanet i Vives (1833–1901)
4. Maria Caterina Troiani (1813–1887)
5. Teresa Valsé Pantellini (1878–1907)

=== December 17, 1982 ===
1. Hedwig Borzecka (1863–1907)
2. Maria Crocifissa Constantini (1713–1787)

== 1983 ==
=== January 13, 1983 ===
1. Daniel Brottier (1876–1936)
2. Karolina Gerhardinger (1797–1879)
3. Pauline Mallinckrodt (1817–1881)

=== March 21, 1983 ===
1. Leo Dupont (1797–1876)
2. Nicolas Barré (1621–1686)
3. Pius of Saint Aloysius (1868–1889)

=== May 14, 1983 ===
1. Étienne Pernet (1824–1899)
2. Hyacinthe-Marie Cormier (1832–1916)
3. Rupert Mayer (1876–1945)
4. Ursula Ledóchowska (1865–1939)
5. Victoire Rasoamanarivo (1848–1894)

=== June 9, 1983 ===
1. Domenico Mazzarella (1802–1854)
2. Eugenie Joubert (1876–1904)
3. Giovanni Bruni (1882–1897)
4. María Teresa Gonzalez-Quevedo Cadarso (1930–1950)

=== July 9, 1983 ===
1. Blandine Merten (1883–1918)
2. Dorotea Chopitea Villota Serra (1816–1891)

=== September 24, 1983 ===
1. Aimée-Adèle Le Bouteiller (1816–1883)
2. Marcelo Spinola y Maestre (1835–1906)
3. Peter Friedhofen (1819–1860)

== 1984 ==
=== January 12, 1984 ===
1. José María Rubio (1864–1929)
2. Nicolas Steno (1638–1686)

=== February 17, 1984 ===
1. Giuseppe Nascimbeni (1851–1922)
2. Polycarpe Gondre (1801–1856)

=== April 7, 1984 ===
1. Kuriakose Elias Chavara (1805–1871)
2. María del Carmen González-Ramos García-Prieto de Muñoz (1834–1899)
3. Virginia Centurione Bracelli (1587–1651)

=== June 9, 1984 ===
1. Catherine of St. Augustine (1632–1668)
2. Jean-Bernard Rousseau (1797–1867)
3. Pierre-Joseph Cassant (1878–1903)

=== November 9, 1984 ===
1. Alphonsa Muttathupadathu (1910–1946)

=== December 14, 1984 ===
1. Ulrika Nisch (1882–1913)

== 1985 ==
=== March 21, 1985 ===
1. Eustochia Smeralda Calafato (1434–1485)
2. Francinaina Cirer Carbonell (1781–1855)
3. Frédéric Janssoone (1838–1916)
4. Pierre-François Jamet (1762–1845)

=== May 9, 1985 ===
1. Giuseppe Giaccardo (1896–1948)
2. Junípero Serra (1713–1784)

=== July 6, 1985 ===
1. Benedetta Cambiagio Frassinello (1791–1858)
2. Miguel Mañara Vicenetelo de Leca Colona (1627–1679)
3. Pope Pius IX (1792–1878)
4. Teresa Grillo Michel (1855–1944)

=== November 16, 1985 ===
1. Antonio Angelo Cavanis (1772–1858)
2. Giuseppe Bedetti (1799–1889)
3. Marco Antonio Cavanis (1774–1853)
4. Savina Petrilli (1851–1923)

== 1986 ==
=== January 16, 1986 ===
1. Giovanni Calabria (1873–1954)
2. José Gregorio Hernández (1864–1919)
3. Kaspar Stanggassinger (1871–1899)
4. Marie-Louise-Élisabeth de Lamoignon (1763–1825)

=== March 22, 1986 ===
1. Alberto Marvelli (1918–1946)
2. Cayetana Alberta Giménez Adrover (1837–1922)
3. Edoardo Giuseppe Rosaz (1830–1903)
4. Giovanni Battista Piamarta(1841–1913)
5. Teresa of Los Andes (1900–1920)

=== June 5, 1986 ===
1. Adèle de Batz de Trenquelléon (1789–1828)
2. Julian-Nicolas Rèche (1838–1890)
3. Laura Vicuña (1891–1904)
4. Maria Anna Rosa Caiani (1863–1921)

=== June 30, 1986 ===
1. Edward Poppe (1890–1924)
2. Pietro Bonilli (1841–1935)

=== November 10, 1986 ===
1. Agnelo de Souza (1869–1927)
2. Francisco Palau (1811–1872)

== 1987 ==
=== January 3, 1987 ===
1. Francisco de Paula Tarin Arnau (1847–1910)
2. Giuseppina Catanea (1894–1948)
3. Josefa Naval Girbés (1820–1893)
4. Philip Rinaldi (1856–1931)
5. Victor Scheppers (1802–1877)

=== January 26, 1987 ===
1. Giuseppe Baldo (1843–1915)
2. Katharine Drexel (1858–1955)

=== March 16, 1987 ===
1. Giovanni Battista Scalabrini (1839–1905)
2. Honorat Koźmiński (1829–1916)
3. María Pilar López de Maturana Ortiz de Zárate (1884–1934)
4. Eleonora Ramirez di Montalvo (1602–1659)

=== June 1, 1987 ===
1. Cecilia Eusepi (1910–1928)

=== October 23, 1987 ===
1. Angela Salawa (1881–1922)
2. Lucia Burlini (1710–1789)
3. Mariano Avellana (1844–1904)
4. Marie Deluil-Martiny (1841–1884)
5. Narcisa de Jesús (1832–1869)
6. Nazju Falzon (1813–1865)
7. Pier Giorgio Frassati (1901–1925)
8. Pierre Bonhomme (1806–1861)
9. Thomas Olera (1563–1631)

=== December 11, 1987 ===
1. Benvenuto Bambozzi (1809–1875)
2. Bernardo Maria Clausi (1789–1849)
3. Elisha Fracasso of Saint Clement (1901–1927)

== 1988 ==
=== February 8, 1988 ===
1. Francesco Chiesa (1874–1946)
2. Maria Elisabetta Renzi (1786–1859)
3. Lorenzo Maria of Saint Francis Xavier (1782–1856)
4. Mary Potter (1847–1913)
5. Pauline of the Agonizing Heart of Jesus (1865–1942)
6. Pierre Bienvenu Noailles (1793–1861)

=== March 28, 1988 ===
1. Louise-Thérèse de Montaignac de Chauvance (1820–1885)
2. Maggiorino Vigolungo (1904–1918)

=== September 1, 1988 ===
1. Dina Bosatta (1858–1887)
2. Euthymia Üffing (1914–1955)
3. Francesca Maria Rubatto (1844–1904)
4. Maddalena Caterina Morano (1847–1908)
5. Nazaria Ignacia March Mesa (1889–1943)

=== November 28, 1988 ===
1. Joseph Savelberg (1827–1907)
2. Paula Montal Fornés (1799–1889)

== 1989 ==
=== February 11, 1989 ===
1. Agnes of Bohemia (1211–1282)

=== February 18, 1989 ===
1. Elisabetta Vendramini (1790–1860)
2. Józef Sebastian Pelczar (1842–1924)
3. Maria Angela Picco (1867–1921)
4. Marie Theodore Voiron (1835–1925)
5. Paolo Manna (1872–1952)

=== May 13, 1989 ===
1. Adolph Kolping (1813–1865)
2. Annunciata Astoria Cocchetti (1800–1882)
3. Dina Belanger (1897–1929)
4. Francisco Marto (1908–1919)
5. Giuseppe Allamano (1851–1926)
6. Jacinta Marto (1910–1920)
7. Jaume Clotet Fabres (1822–1898)
8. Joseph Vaz (1651–1711)
9. Maria Leonardo Ranixe (1796–1875)
10. María Natividad Venegas de la Torre (1868–1959)
11. Maria Schininà (1844–1910)

=== September 7, 1989 ===
1. Balbino Sanchez Mayorga (1865–1934)
2. Carlo Sterpi (1874–1951)
3. Claudio Granzotto (1900–1947)
4. Filomena Ferrer Galcerán (1841–1868)
5. José Maria de Yermo y Parres (1851–1904)
6. María Josefa Sancho de Guerra (1842–1912)
7. Nazareno Santolini (1859–1930)
8. Nimatullah Kassab (1808–1858)
9. Rafael Arnáiz Barón (1911–1938)

=== December 21, 1989 ===
1. Agostino Roscelli (1818–1902)
2. Annibale Maria di Francia (1851–1927)
3. Esteban Marcuello Zabalza (1808–1880)
4. Jacques Gianiel (1714–1750)
5. Johann Philipp Jeningen (1642–1704)
6. Kazimierz Wyszyński (1700–1755)
7. Leonardo Castellanos y Castellanos (1862–1912)
8. Marie-Thérèse Charlotte de Lamourous (1754–1836)

== 1990 ==
=== March 3, 1990 ===
1. Andrea Maria Borello (1916–1948)
2. Anne de Guigné (1911–1922)
3. Exupérien Mas (1829–1905)
4. Francesco Spinelli (1853–1913)
5. Gaetano Catanoso (1879–1963)
6. Mariano de Jesús Euse Hoyos (1845–1926)
7. Pietro Leonardi (1769–1844)
8. Saturnina Jassa Fontcuberta (1851–1936)
9. Teodoreto Garberoglio (1871–1954)

=== April 9, 1990 ===
1. Antonio Vicenzo Gallo (1899–1934)
2. Catherine McAuley (1778–1841)
3. Josemaría Escrivá (1902–1975)
4. Juan Diego Cuauhtlatoatzin (1474–1548)
5. Ramon Ibarra González (1851–1925)

=== July 10, 1990 ===
1. Colomba Matylda Gabriel (1858–1926)
2. Giuseppe Ambrosini (1889–1913)
3. Marguerite Bays (1815–1879)
4. Marie Louise Trichet (1684–1759)

== 1991 ==
=== January 22, 1991 ===
1. Alfano Vaser (1873–1943)
2. Antonio Augusto Intreccialagli (1852–1924)
3. Bolesława Lament (1862–1946)
4. Camille Costa de Beauregard (1841–1910)
5. Elena Aiello (1895–1961)
6. Gaetana Sterni (1827–1889)
7. Genoveva Torres Morales (1870–1956)
8. Giuseppe Oddi (1839–1919)
9. John Henry Newman (1801–1890)
10. Laura of Saint Catherine of Siena (1874–1949)
11. Maria Teresa Merlo (1894–1964)
12. Pietro Casani (1570–1647)
13. Vicente Bernedo (1562–1619)
14. Zefirino Agostini (1813–1896)

=== May 14, 1991 ===
1. Alfred Pampalon (1867–1896)
2. Anne de Xainctonge (1567–1621)
3. Cesare Guasti (1822–1889)
4. Clara Fey (1815–1894)
5. Egidio Laurent (1884–1941)
6. Elisabetta Maria Satellico (1706–1745)
7. Gabriel Taborin (1799–1864)
8. Giuseppe Bartolomeo Menochio (1741–1823)
9. Giuseppe Giraldi (1848–1901)
10. Grimoaldo of the Purification (1883–1902)
11. Helena Stollenwerk (1852–1900)
12. Hendrina Stenmanns (1852–1903)
13. Jean-Baptiste Delaveyne (1653–1719)
14. Marie Anne Blondin (1809–1890)
15. Paolo Giuseppe Maria Frassinetti (1804–1868)

=== July 6, 1991 ===
1. John Duns Scotus (1266–1308)
2. Émilie de Villeneuve (1811–1854)
3. Gianna Beretta Molla (1922–1962)
4. Marco d'Aviano (1631–1699)
5. María Rafols Bruna (1781–1853)

=== December 21, 1991 ===
1. Alberto Hurtado (1901–1952)
2. Anita Cantieri (1910–1942)
3. Emmanuel d'Alzon (1810–1880)
4. Gerardo Sagarduy de Lasgoitia (1881–1962)
5. Jordan Mai (1866–1922)
6. Maria Bernarda Bütler (1848–1924)
7. Maria Lucrezia Zileri dal Verme (1839–1923)
8. Marie Poussepin (1653–1744)
9. Oreste Fontanella (1883–1935)
10. Vicenta Chávez Orozco (1867–1949)
11. Vincenzo Cimatti (1879–1965)

== 1992 ==
=== March 7, 1992 ===
1. Angelico Pittavino (1875–1953)
2. Faustina Kowalska (1905–1938)
3. Genoveffa De Troia (1887–1949)
4. Giuditta Vannini (1859–1911)
5. Jeanne Chezard de Matel (1596–1670)
6. Laura Evangelista Alvarado Cardozo (1875–1967)

=== June 13, 1992 ===
1. Antonietta Farani (1906–1963)
2. Cornelia Connelly (1809–1879)
3. Giovanni Battista Rubino (1776–1853)
4. José María Amigó Ferrer (1854–1934)
5. Josep Torras i Bages (1846–1916)
6. María Teresa González Justo (1921–1967)
7. Mary MacKillop (1842–1909)
8. Monica Cornago Zapater (1889–1964)
9. Stanislaus Papczyński (1631–1701)

=== July 11, 1992 ===
1. Fortunato De Gruttis (1826–1905)
2. László Batthyány-Strattmann (1870–1931)
3. Luigi Talamoni (1848–1926)
4. María Dolores Rodríguez Sopeña (1848–1918)
5. Théodore Guérin (1798–1856)

=== December 21, 1992 ===
1. Agostino Chieppi (1830–1891)
2. Felix Mary Ghebreamlak (1895–1934)
3. Jan Beyzym (1850–1912)
4. Khalīl al-Haddād (1875–1954)
5. Nicolas Roland (1642–1678)
6. Stanisław Kazimierczyk (1433–1489)
7. Vittorio De Marino (1863–1929)

== 1993 ==
=== April 2, 1993 ===
1. Anna Maria Katherina Scherer (1825–1888)
2. Camila Rolón (1842–1913)
3. Daniel Coppini (1867–1945)
4. Edmund Ignatius Rice (1762–1844)
5. Francisco de Asís Méndez Casariego (1850–1924)
6. Luigi Variara (1875–1923)
7. Paola Renata Carboni (1908–1927)
8. Simaan Srugi (1877–1927)
9. Zygmunt Łoziński (1870–1932)

=== July 6, 1993 ===
1. Candida Maria of Jesus (1845–1912)
2. Cesare Maria Barzaghi (1863–1941)
3. Frédéric Ozanam (1813–1853)
4. Giuseppe Pesci (1853–1929)
5. Maria Raffaella Cimatti (1861–1945)
6. Samuel Charles Mazzuchelli (1806–1864)

=== December 23, 1993 ===
1. Benedetta Bianchi Porro (1936–1964)
2. Eleonora López de Maturana (1884–1931)
3. Emilia Chapellín Istúriz (1858–1893)
4. Émilie d'Oultremont d'Hoogvorst (1818–1878)
5. Émilie Gamelin (1800–1851)
6. Maria Antonia Paris (1813–1885)

== 1994 ==
=== March 26, 1994 ===
1. Alfredo Ildefonso Schuster (1880–1954)
2. Bernarda Heimgartner (1822–1863)
3. Daniel Comboni (1831–1881)
4. Felix Monasterio Ateca (1902–1951)
5. Giuseppina Gabriela Bonino (1843–1906)
6. José Gras Granollers (1834–1918)
7. José León Torres (1849–1930)
8. Julio María Matovelle (1852–1929)
9. Louis Martin (1823–1894)
10. Marie-Azélie Guérin Martin (1831–1877)
11. Maria Domenica Brun Barbantini (1789–1868)
12. María Isabel Tejada Cuartas (1887–1925)
13. Mary Theresa Dudzik (1860–1918)

=== July 2, 1994 ===
1. Bronisław Markiewicz (1842–1912)
2. John of Dukla (1414–1484)
3. Lucia Mangano (1896–1946)
4. Luigi Caburlotto (1817–1897)
5. María Amparo Delgado García (1889–1941)
6. Maria Cristina of the Immaculate Conception (1856–1906)
7. Zdislava Berka (1220–1252)

=== December 15, 1994 ===
1. Consuelo Utrilla Lozano (1925–1956)
2. Edel Quinn (1907–1944)
3. Gabriele Allegra (1907–1976)
4. Jan Wojciech Balicki (1869–1948)
5. Manuel Míguez González (1831–1925)
6. Maria Elena Bettini (1814–1894)
7. Marcelina Darowska (1827–1911)
8. Marie-Alphonsine Danil Ghattas (1843–1927)
9. Norberto Cassinelli (1827–1911)
10. Peregrina Mogas Fontcuberta (1827–1886)

== 1995 ==
=== April 6, 1995 ===
1. Anton Maria Schwartz (1852–1929)
2. Ferdinando Maria Baccilieri (1821–1893)
3. Gaetano Tantalo (1905–1947)
4. Giuseppe Tovini (1814–1897)
5. Gregor Cäsarius Buhl (1896–1973)
6. María Antonia Bandrés Elósegui (1898–1919)
7. Maria Vicenta Rosal (1820–1886)
8. Rudolf Komorek (1890–1949)

=== July 11, 1995 ===
1. Anna Schäffer (1882–1925)
2. Cyprian Iwene Tansi (1903–1964)
3. Enrico Rebuschini (1860–1938)
4. Filippo Smaldone (1848–1923)
5. Franz Alexander Kern (1897–1924)
6. Germano Ruopollo (1850–1909)
7. Juan Collell Cuatrecasas (1864–1921)
8. Maria Chiara Magro (1923–1969)
9. Maria Karłowska (1865–1935)
10. Maria Giovanna Fasce (1881–1947)
11. Solanus Casey (1870–1957)

== 1996 ==
=== January 12, 1996 ===
1. Alexandrina Maria da Costa (1904–1955)
2. Alpert Mosch (1849–1898)
3. Bernardo de Hoyos (1711–1735)
4. Élisabeth Bergeron (1851–1936)
5. Flora Manfrinati (1906–1954)
6. Juan Vicente Zengotitabengoa Lausen (1862–1943)
7. María del Carmen González-Valerio (1930–1939)
8. Maria Klara Fietz (1905–1937)

=== May 13, 1996 ===
1. Anton Martin Slomšek (1800–1862)

=== June 25, 1996 ===
1. Antonio Amundarain Garmendia (1885–1954)
2. Elisa Angela Meneguzzi (1901–1941)
3. James Alberione (1884–1971)
4. Maria Teresa Lega (1812–1890)
5. Nicola da Gesturi (1882–1958)
6. Teresa Gallifa Palmarola (1850–1907)

=== December 17, 1996 ===
1. Bernardyna Maria Jabłońska (1878–1940)
2. Carmen Salles y Barangueras (1848–1911)
3. Caterina Cittadini (1801–1857)
4. Eusebia Palomino Yenes (1899–1935)
5. Jadwiga of Poland (1374–1399)
6. María de las Maravillas de Jesús (1891–1974)
7. Pierre Toussaint (1766–1853)
8. Regina Protmann (1552–1613)
9. Teresa Mira García (1895–1941)

== 1997 ==
=== March 8, 1997 ===
1. Anthony of St. Ann Galvão (1739–1822)
2. Gioacchino Maria Stevan (1921–1949)
3. Giovanna Maria Bracaval (1861–1935)
4. Léon Dehon (1843–1925)
5. Louis-Antoine-Rose Ormières Lacase (1809–1890)
6. Maria Carmelina Leone (1923–1940)

=== July 7, 1997 ===
1. Artémides Zatti (1880–1951)
2. Carla Ronci (1936–1970)
3. Carlos Manuel Rodríguez Santiago (1918–1963)
4. Egidio Bullesi (1905–1929)
5. Juana María Condesa Lluch (1862–1916)
6. Maria Teresa Casini (1864–1937)
7. Pierre Monnereau (1787–1856)

=== December 18, 1997 ===
1. Ave Maria Pisano (1900–1964)
2. Delia Tetreault (1865–1941)
3. Giuseppe Picco (1867–1946)
4. Józef Bilczewski (1860–1923)
5. Justin Russolillo (1891–1955)
6. Pio of Pietrelcina (1887–1968)
7. Saturnina Rodríguez de Zavalía (1823–1896)
8. Secondo Pollo (1908–1941)
9. Thérèse of St. Augustine (1737–1787)
10. Tommaso Reggio (1818–1901)

== 1998 ==
=== April 6, 1998 ===
1. Alberto Capellan Zuazo (1888–1965)
2. Francesco Paleari (1863–1939)
3. François Gaschon (1732–1815)
4. Giovanni Maria Boccardo (1848–1913)
5. Josaphata Hordashevska (1869–1919)
6. Manuel González y García (1877–1940)
7. Maria Anna Donati (1848–1925)
8. Maria Gioia (1904|–1931)
9. Maria Güell Puig (1848–1921)
10. Paolo Pio Perazzo (1846–1911)

=== July 3, 1998 ===
1. Edmund Bojanowski (1814–1871)
2. Elisabetta Girelli (1839–1919)
3. Kinga of Poland (1224–1292)
4. Maddalena Girelli (1838–1923)
5. María Dolores Medina Zepeda (1860–1925)
6. Maria Maddalena of the Holy Cross Alesci (1901–1929)
7. Rosa Ojeda Creus (1871–1954)

=== December 21, 1998 ===
1. Anastasius Hartmann (1803–1866)
2. Arcangelo Tadini (1846–1912)
3. Firminius Wickenhauser (1876–1939)
4. Georges Bellanger (1861–1902)
5. Giacinto Longhin (1863–1936)
6. Jean Leon Le Prévost (1803–1874)
7. Josefa Campos Talamanes (1872–1950)
8. Maria Teresa Cortimiglia (1867–1934)
9. Rosa Maria Benedetta Gattorno Custo (1831–1900)

== 1999 ==
=== March 26, 1999 ===
1. Aureliano Landeta Azcueta (1887–1963)
2. Egidio Malacarne (1877–1953)
3. Elizabeth Hesselblad (1870–1957)
4. Isabel Larrañaga Ramirez (1836–1899)
5. Lino Maupas (1866–1924)

=== June 28, 1999 ===
1. Columba Marmion (1858–1923)
2. George Preca (1880–1962)
3. Jeronimo Mariano Usera Alarcon (1810–1891)
4. María del Tránsito Cabanillas (1821–1855)
5. Maria Josefa Karolina Brader (1860–1943)
6. Maria Theresa Chiramel (1876–1926)
7. Mary of the Passion (1839–1904)
8. Pablo de Anda Padilla (1830–1904)

=== December 20, 1999 ===
1. Concepcion Cabrera de Armida (1862–1937)
2. Elena Silvestri (1839–1907)
3. Pope John XXIII (1881–1963)
4. Zygmunt Gorazdowski (1845–1920)

== 2000 ==
=== January 27, 2000 ===
1. Francis Xavier Seelos (1819–1867)

=== July 1, 2000 ===
1. Adrian Osmolowski (1838–1924)
2. Bonifacia Rodríguez y Castro (1837–1905)
3. Bruna Pellesi (1911–1972)
4. Carlo Liviero (1866–1932)
5. Carolina Santocanale (1852–1923)
6. Casimiro Barello Morello (1857–1884)
7. Eugenia Maria Ravasco (1845–1900)
8. Félix de Jesús Rougier (1859–1938)
9. Marcantonio Durando (1801–1880)
10. Maria Guadalupe Garcia Zavala (1878–1963)
11. María Luisa Josefa (1866–1937)
12. Tomasa Ortiz Real (1842–1916)

=== December 18, 2000 ===
1. Giuseppe Ghezzi (1872–1955)
2. Janina Szymkowiak (1910–1942)
3. Librada Orozco Santa Cruz (1834–1926)
4. Maria Candida of the Eucharist (1884–1949)
5. Maria Pilar Izquierdo Albero (1906–1945)
6. Maria Romero Meneses (1902–1977)
7. Vendelin Vosnjak (1861–1933)

== 2001 ==
=== April 24, 2001 ===
1. Anne Catherine Emmerich (1774–1824)
2. Caterina Sordini (1770–1824)
3. Charles de Foucauld (1858–1916)
4. Concetta Bertoli (1908–1956)
5. Giovanni Antonio Farina (1803–1888)
6. Giuseppe Gualandi (1826–1907)
7. Luigi Monti (1825–1900)
8. Luigi Tezza (1841–1923)
9. Maria Adeodata Pisani (1806–1855)
10. Maria Domenica Mantovani (1862–1934)
11. Rosalie Rendu (1786–1856)
12. Tommaso Maria Fusco (1831–1891)
13. Zygmunt Szczęsny Feliński (1822–1895)

=== July 7, 2001 ===
1. Luigi Beltrame Quattrocchi (1880–1951)
2. Maria Corsini Quattrocchi (1884–1965)

=== December 20, 2001 ===
1. Antonina De Angelis (1880–1962)
2. Bruno Marchesini (1915–1938)
3. Juan Nepomuceno Zegrí Moreno (1831–1905)
4. Pedro Legaria Armendariz (1878–1956)

== 2002 ==
=== April 23, 2002 ===
1. Gioacchino La Lomia (1831–1905)
2. Giulia Salzano (1846–1929)
3. Giuseppe Morgera (1844–1898)
4. Matilde of the Sacred Heart (1841–1902)
5. Maria Anna Saltini Testi (1889–1957
6. Maria Josefa Alhama y Valera (1893–1983)

=== July 5, 2002 ===
1. Euphrasia Eluvathingal (1877–1952)
2. Giulia Valle (1847–1916)
3. Maria Pia Mastena (1881–1951)
4. Marija Petković (1892–1966)
5. Ivan Merz (1896–1928)

=== December 20, 2002 ===
1. Carlo Gnocchi (1902–1956)
2. Maria Teresa of St. Joseph (1855–1938)
3. Maria Crocifissa Curcio (1877–1957)
4. Teresa of Calcutta (1910–1997)

== 2003 ==
=== April 12, 2003 ===
1. Anna Maria Fiorelli Lapini (1809–1860)
2. Ascensión Nicol y Goñi (1868–1940)
3. Basil Moreau (1799–1873)
4. Charles I of Austria (1887–1922)
5. Eustáquio van Lieshout (1890–1943)
6. Filippo Bardellini (1878–1956)
7. Luigi Boccardo (1861–1936)
8. Luigi Bordino (1922–1977)
9. Mosè Tovini (1877–1930)

=== July 7, 2003 ===
1. Clemens August Graf von Galen (1878–1946)
2. Costanza Starace (1845–1921)
3. Eurosia Fabris (1866–1932)
4. Pierre Vigne (1670–1740)

=== December 20, 2003 ===
1. Angelo Calvi (1909–1937)
2. Luigi Biraghi (1801–1879)
3. Luigi Monza (1898–1954)
4. Maria Scrilli (1825–1889)
5. Maria Nazarena Majone (1869–1939)
6. Rita Amada de Jesus (1848–1913)

== 2004 ==
=== April 19, 2004 ===
1. Candlemas of San José (1863–1940)
2. Felice Prinetti (1842–1916)
3. Francesco Maria Greco (1857–1931)
4. Jose Gabriel del Rosario Brochero (1840–1914)
5. Maria Grazia Tarallo (1866–1912)
6. Marianne Cope (1838–1918)
7. María del Pilar Cimadevilla López-Dóriga (1952–1962)
8. Silvio Gallotti (1881–1927)
9. Teresa Guasch Toda (1848–1917)

=== June 28, 2004 ===
1. Alfonsa Clerici (1860–1930)
2. Julia Navarette Guerrero (1881–1974)
3. María Angélica Pérez (1897–1932)
4. Pere Tarrés i Claret (1905–1950)
5. Thevarparampil Kunjachan (1891–1973)
6. Vittoria Gisella Gregoris (1873–1935)

=== December 20, 2004 ===
1. Boļeslavs Sloskāns (1893–1981)
2. Ignacy Kłopotowski (1866–1931)
3. Luigi Maria Olivares (1873–1943)
4. Maria Merkert (1817–1872)
5. Mariano de la Mata (1905–1983)
6. Marta Anna Wiecka (1874–1904)
7. Michał Sopoćko (1888–1975)
8. Róża Filipa Białecka (1838–1887)
9. Titus Horten (1882–1936)
10. Virgilio Angioni (1878–1947)

== See also ==
- List of people declared venerable by Pope John XXIII
- List of people declared venerable by Pope Paul VI
- List of people declared venerable by Pope Benedict XVI
- List of people declared venerable by Pope Francis
