= Riminucci =

Riminucci is an Italian surname. Notable people with the surname include:

- Pietro Riminucci (1875–1960), Italian Roman Catholic priest
- Sandro Riminucci (born 1935), Italian basketball player
