= María de la Purísima Salvat Romero =

Spanish Roman Catholic nun

Saint María de la Purísima Salvat Romero HCC
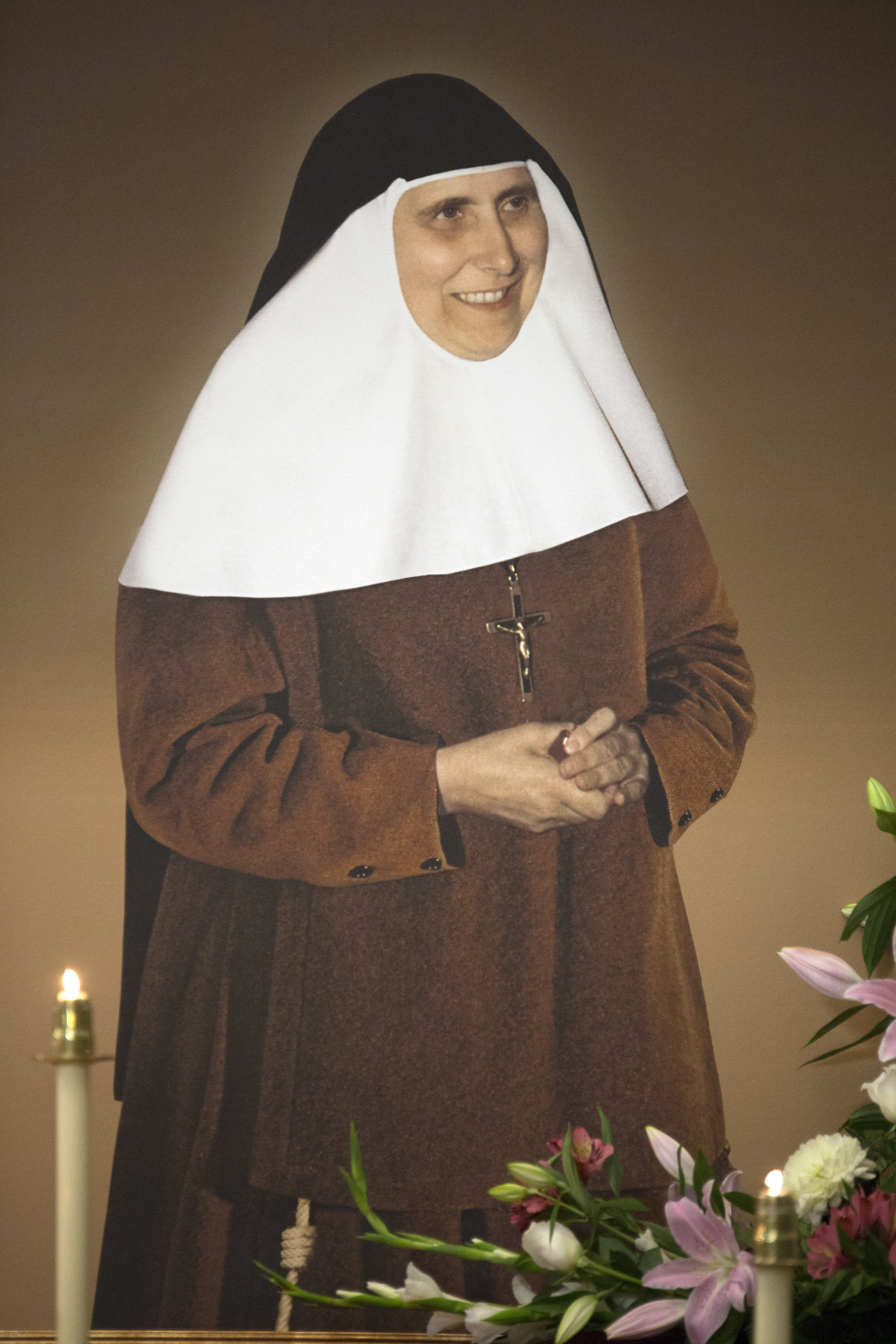

Virgin
- Born: 20 February 1926; Madrid, Kingdom of Spain
- Died: 31 October 1998 (aged 72); Seville, Spain
- Venerated in: Roman Catholic Church
- Beatified: 18 September 2010, Seville, Spain by Archbishop Angelo Amato
- Canonized: 18 October 2015, Saint Peter's Square, Vatican City by Pope Francis
- Feast: 18 September

María de la Purísima Salvat Romero (20 February 1926 – 31 October 1998), born María Isabel Salvat Romero, was a Spanish religious sister of the Sisters of the Company of the Cross. She assumed the religious name María de la Purísima of the Cross.

Romero was the successor of Angela of the Cross of the latter's congregation and was known for her firmness in the progress of the congregation and in their role as servants of God and his people, also for her strong commitment to uphold the magisterium of the church.

She was beatified on 18 September 2010 in Seville and canonised on 18 October 2015.

== Life ==
María de la Purísima Salvat Romero was born in 1926 in Spain to Ricardo Salvat Albert and Margarita Romero Ferrer as the third of eight children.

She was baptized the following day in the church of Our Lady of the Conception on Goya Street. As a child she attended the school of the Irish Sisters in Madrid and received her First Communion at the age of six.

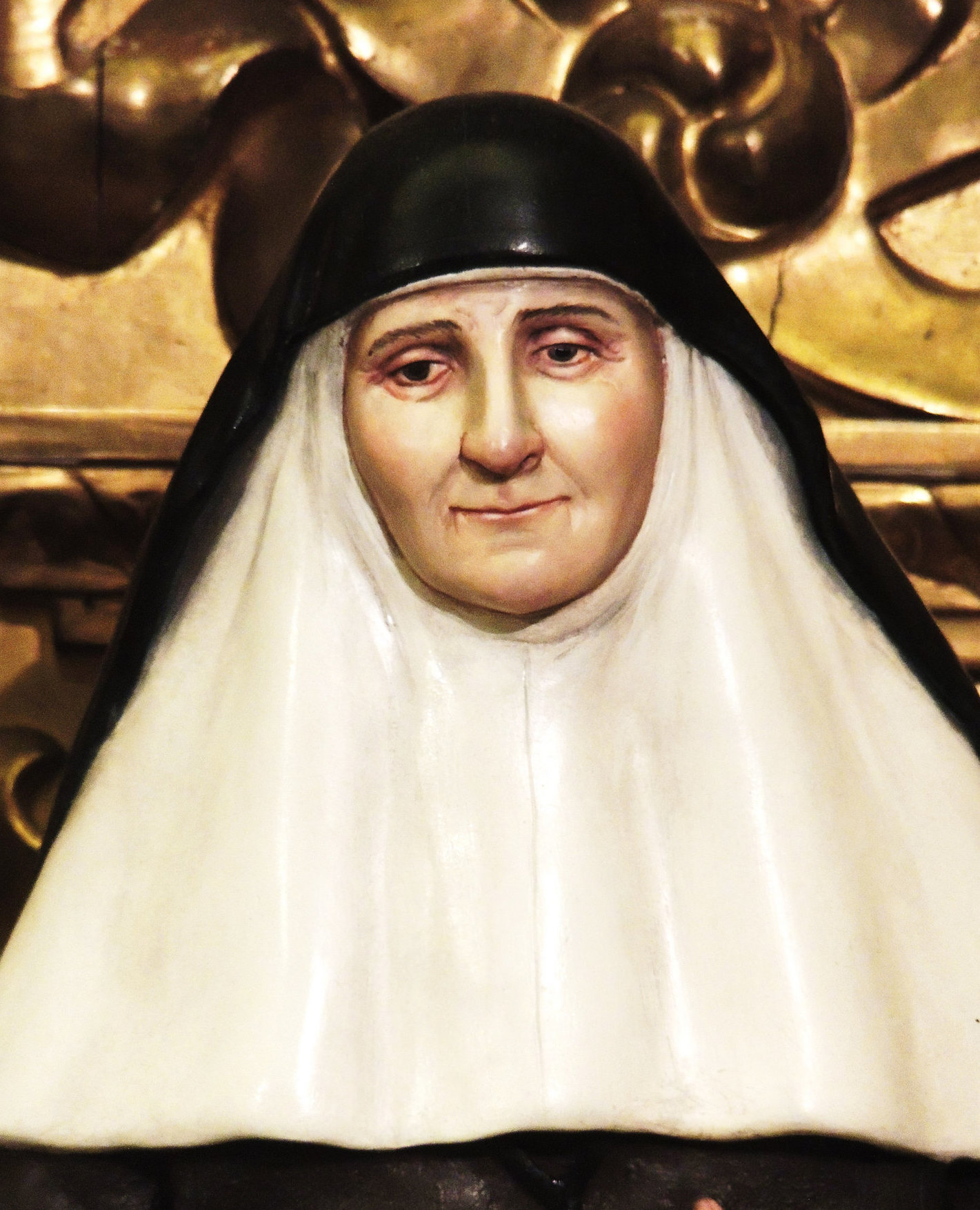
Statue of Saint María de la Purísima in Spain

Romero and her family left Spain for Portugal from July 1936 to 1938 in order to escape the persecutions of the Spanish Civil War; they returned following the conclusion of the conflict. During her time in Portugal, she realized her true calling was to that of religious life. While her mother approved of this decision, her father ultimately attempted to suppress this, though later relented to the strong desire of his daughter.

Romero joined the Sisters of the Company of the Cross, established by Angela of the Cross, on 8 December 1944 and was vested in the habit of the congregation for the first time on 9 June 1945. Romero later made her temporary vows on 27 June 1947 and her perpetual vows on 9 December 1952.

In 1966 she was sent to the Mother House of the congregation in Seville where she, in 1968, was named the Provincial of the Mother House. She eventually ascended to the position of Superior General in 1977 and was reelected thrice, remaining in office until her death.

During her tenure, she oversaw the updating of the constitution while attempting during her term to defend and uphold the charism of the congregation. She continued to safeguard the charism while focusing on a renewed fidelity to the message of the Gospel and the magisterium of the Catholic Church, as well as an added emphasis on Marian and Eucharistic devotion. Romero also met with the sick and the poor each morning, working tirelessly for them in terms of serving them food and cleaning their clothes. In her role as Mother General she attended the beatification of Angela of the Cross by Pope John Paul II on 5 November 1982.

Romero was diagnosed with a tumor in 1994 and she faced her illness for the next four years with great docility to the will of God. Romero died in Seville on 31 October 1998.

== Beatification process ==
The canonization process commenced with the declaration of nihil obstat ("nothing against") on 13 January 2004 which bestowed upon her the title of Servant of God. The cause opened in Seville and the local process spanned from 20 February 2004 until 15 November 2004. The process was validated on 2 July 2005.

The positio (documentation on her life of heroic virtue) was forwarded to the Congregation for the Causes of Saints in 2006 which allowed for Pope Benedict XVI to declare her venerable on 17 January 2009. A miracle attributed to her intercession was investigated on a local level that spanned from 4 November 2005 to 13 February 2006, and was validated on 13 December 2006. Pope Benedict XVI approved the miracle on 27 March 2010. The miracle involved the curing of Ana Maria Rodriguez Casado who was cured at the age of three in 2004 after being in a vegetative state; the girl celebrated her First Communion at the beatification Mass. Cardinal Angelo Amato celebrated the beatification on 18 September 2010.

A second miracle attributed to her intercession was investigated and was validated on 13 December 2013. On 5 May 2015, Pope Francis approved the miracle, which allowed for her to be canonized. A date was set for her canonization; it was determined at a consistory on 27 June 2015 and she was canonized as a saint of the Catholic Church on 18 October 2015.

On 14 August 2015, prior to the canonization, it was announced that the Congregation for Divine Worship and the Discipline of the Sacraments designated 18 September (the date of Romero's beatification) as the feast day in the liturgical calendar.
