= Peregrina Mogas Fontcuberta =

Spanish Roman Catholic nun

Blessed Peregrina Mogas Fontcuberta
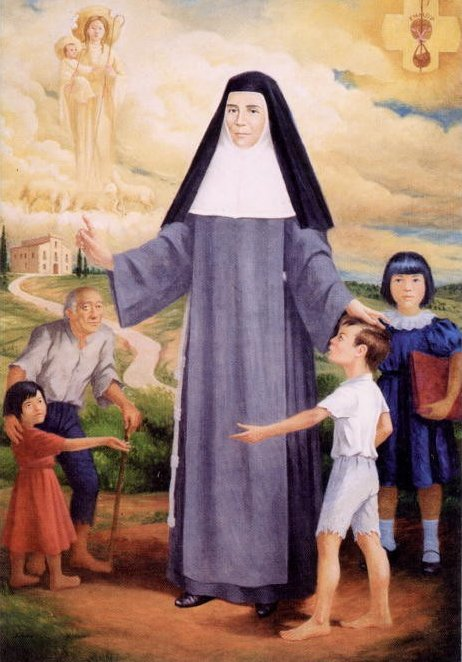
- Born: 13 January 1827; Corró de Vall, Granollers, Barcelona, Kingdom of Spain
- Died: 3 July 1886 (aged 59); Fuencarral, Madrid, Kingdom of Spain
- Venerated in: Roman Catholic Church
- Beatified: 6 October 1996, Saint Peter's Square, Vatican City by Pope John Paul II
- Feast: 3 July
- Attributes: Religious habit
- Patronage: Franciscan Missionaries of the Mother of the Divine Shepherd

Peregrina Mogas Fontcuberta (13 January 1827 - 3 July 1886) was a Spanish Roman Catholic nun in the name of "María Ana" and the founder of the Franciscan Missionaries of the Mother of the Divine Shepherd. Mogas Fontcuberta was in a Capuchin congregation before establishing her own order and was under the guidance of Josep Tous Soler.

The beatification cause commenced under Pope Paul VI on 11 June 1977 and Pope John Paul II beatified her on 6 October 1996.

== Life ==
Peregrina Mogas Fontcuberta was born in Granollers, a textile and farming city about thirty miles from Barcelona in Spain's Catalonia region on 13 January 1827. She was the third of four children of Llorenç Mogas – a farmer and innkeeper – and Magdalena Fontcuberta. She was baptized mere hours after her birth and made her First Communion either at the age of six or seven. Her father died when she was seven and her mother only survived him by six years.

After her parents died, her childless and widowed paternal aunt Dona Maria Mogas – who was also her godmother – raised Fontcuberta. The teenager joined many parish activities at Santa Maria del Mar, and the parish priest Mosen Gorgas became her confessor.

During the political tumult in Barcelona in 1848, Fontcuberta met two nuns of the Capuchin congregation living together in a rented flat, and through them met Josep Tous Soler. The Bishop of Vic Luciano Casadevall had allowed them to open a school in Ripoll. Impressed by Father Soler's charisma as well, as their joint dedication to the path of Francis of Assisi, Fontcuberta decided to join the religious at the school, and left all she had to follow this calling.

Thus, in 1850, despite her confessor's concerns, Fontcuberta went to Ripoll, and was formally clothed in the habit of the Capuchins of the Divine Shepherdess. The school opened on 27 May 1850. Despite still being in the novitiate and lacking a formal teaching diploma, less than a month later (on 13 June 1850), Fontcuberta was named the school's superior and formally became such in September 1851. Nonetheless, she returned to the cloistered life in October 1851 to complete her novitiate. On 25 January 1851 she made her profession into the order. She received her teaching diploma in March 1853, then assumed her new religious name of "María Ana" on 25 June.

Fontcuberta also met and discussed teaching with Antonio Maria Claret. On 10 December 1865 she accompanied four nuns to assist Antonia de Oviedo Schöntal with her new religious congregation. In 1868 Fontcubra led a group of religious to Spain's capital city, Madrid, where they founded a kindergarten. Despite political unrest (particularly after the assassination of the progressive Prime Minister Juan Prim in December 1870), the religious persisted in their mission to educate the city's poor and help the sick. Spain's Cardinal Archbishop of Toledo (the country's leading prelate) Cirilo de Alameda y Brea formally approved Fontcuberta's founding a new religious order, recognizing it on 16 January 1872 as the Franciscan Missionaries of the Mother of the Divine Shepherd.

== Death and legacy ==
Fontcuberta died at midnight on 3 July 1886 due to increasing seizures which she had begun suffering in 1878, and which led her to retire to Fuencarral in May 1886.

Logo of the order c. 1900.

Her order grew and eventually pursued recognition for the foundress. Her order was aggregated with other Franciscan Orders on 19 June 1906. As of 2005, the order included 669 religious in 105 houses in locations as diverse as Benin, Argentina and Portugal.

Fontcubra received a papal decree of praise on 22 September 1894, and diocesan approval for her potential beatification came on 4 July 1896. Pope Leo XIII issued formal approval of the potential cause on 8 August 1899. Several sisters of the order were martyred for their faith and religious activities in 1936 during the Spanish Civil War. The informative process concerning Mogas Fontcubra commenced in Madrid on 5 March 1949 and concluded on 28 May 1963. Theologians examined all of her theological writings and declared that the latter complied with the magisterium of the faith, as an official decree declared on 21 October 1965.

Pope Paul VI declared Fontcuberta a Servant of God on 11 June 1977, after the Congregation for the Causes of Saints (C.C.S.) began the formal cause. A diocesan historical commission had begun an investigation which took from 1978 to 1988. Historians met on 9 May 1989 to approve the cause, and the C.C.S. validated their process on 1 December 1989. The C.C.S. received the Positio in 1990 and passed it onto consulting theologians on 3 June 1994 for their approval. The C.C.S. approved the cause on 18 October 1994. Pope John Paul II proclaimed M Fontcubra as Venerable on 15 December 1994 after confirming her life of heroic virtue.

The process of investigating a miracle spanned from 1989 until 1990 and received C.C.S. validation on 12 February 1993. A medical board approved the miracle on 14 June 1995, and theologians came to the same conclusion on 1 November 1995. After the C.C.S. voted in favor on 5 March 1996, Pope John Paul II approved the result on 25 June 1996 and beatified her on 6 October 1996.

A church in Madrid is named to honor Maria Ana Mogas Fontcubra.
