= List of people declared venerable by Pope Paul VI =

Pope Paul VI declared 85 individuals venerable, based on the recognition of their heroic virtues from 1963 to 1978, of whom 62 would be beatified.

== 1964 ==
=== February 13, 1964 ===
1. Ludovico of Casoria (1814–1885) (beatified on 18 April 1993, canonized on 23 November 2014)
2. Mary of the Divine Heart (1863–1899) (beatified on 1 November 1975)

=== April 8, 1964 ===
1. Maria Fortunata Viti (1827–1922) (beatified on 8 October 1967)

== 1965 ==
=== July 15, 1965 ===
1. Giuseppe Benedetto Dusmet (1818–1894) (beatified on 25 September 1988)
2. Maria Therese von Wüllenweber (1833–1907) (beatified on 13 October 1968)
3. Charbel Makhluf (1828–1898) (beatified on 5 December 1965, canonized on 9 October 1977)

=== November 23, 1965 ===
1. Bruno Lanteri (1759–1830)

== 1966 ==
=== December 15, 1966 ===
1. Adolf Petit (1822–1914)
2. Andrea Beltrami (1870–1897)
3. Gaspar Bertoni (1777–1853) (beatified on 1 November 1975, canonized on 1 November 1989)
4. Giovanna Francesca Michelotti (1843–1888) (beatified on 1 November 1975)
5. Jean-Marie de Lamennais (1780–1860)
6. Vital-Justin Grandin (1829–1902)

== 1968 ==
=== July 4, 1968 ===
1. Carlo Domenico Albani (1790–1839)
2. Gabriel Rivat (1808–1881)
3. Johann Nepomuk von Tschiderer zu Gleifheim (1777–1860) (beatified on 30 April 1995)
4. Maria Repetto (1807–1890) (beatified on 4 October 1981)

=== September 19, 1968 ===
1. Agostina Livia Pietrantoni (1864–1894) (beatified on 12 November 1972, canonized on 18 April 1999)
2. Charles Schilling (1835–1907)

== 1969 ==
=== January 30, 1969 ===
1. Mary Frances Schervier (1819–1876) (beatified on 28 April 1974)
2. Maximilian Kolbe (1894–1941) (beatified on 17 October 1971, canonized on 10 October 1982)

== 1970 ==
=== March 16, 1970 ===
1. Joseph Freinademetz (1852–1908) (beatified on 19 October 1975, canonized on 5 October 2003)
2. Mary Theresa Ledóchowska (1863–1922) (beatified on 19 October 1975)
3. Miguel Febres Cordero (1854–1910) (beatified on 30 October 1977, canonized on 21 October 1984)
4. Rafaela Ybarra de Vilallonga (1843–1900) (beatified on 30 September 1984)

=== May 4, 1970 ===
1. Clemente Marchisio (1833–1903) (beatified on 30 September 1984)
2. Emmanuel Domingo y Sol (1836–1909) (beatified on 29 March 1987)
3. Francisco Coll Guitart (1812–1875) (beatified on 29 April 1979, canonized on 11 October 2009)
4. Mutien-Marie Wiaux (1841–1917) (beatified on 30 October 1977, canonized on 10 December 1989)
5. Valentinus Paquay (1828–1905) (beatified on 9 November 2003)

=== November 19, 1970 ===
1. Eugène de Mazenod (1782–1861) (beatified on 19 October 1975, canonized on 3 December 1995)
2. Charles Steeb (1773–1856) (beatified on 6 July 1975)
3. María Juana Guillén (1575–1607)
4. Marie-Madeleine d'Houët (1781–1858)

== 1971 ==
=== June 14, 1971 ===
1. Ana Petra Pérez Florido (1845–1906) (beatified on 16 October 1994)
2. Francesco Faà di Bruno (1825–1888) (beatified on 25 September 1988)
3. Giuseppe Toniolo (1845–1918) (beatified on 29 April 2012)
4. Ludovico Necchi Villa (1876–1930)

== 1972 ==
=== June 22, 1972 ===
1. Battista Vernazza (1497–1587)
2. Ceferino Namuncurá (1886–1905) (beatified on 11 November 2007)
3. Giovanni Battista Jossa (1767–1828)
4. Jacques-Désiré Laval (1803–1864) (beatified on 29 April 1979)
5. Jean Gailhac (1802–1890)
6. María López de Rivas Martínez (1560–1640) (beatified on 14 November 1976)

== 1973 ==
=== May 10, 1973 ===
1. Arnold Janssen (1837–1909) (beatified on 19 October 1975, canonized on 5 October 2003)
2. Giovanni Merlini (1795–1873) (beatified on 12 January 2025)
3. Giuseppe Moscati (1880–1927) (beatified on 16 November 1975, canonized on 25 October 1987)
4. Louis-Zéphirin Moreau (1824–1901) (beatified on 10 May 1987)
5. Maria Teresa Zonfrilli (1899–1934)
6. Paula Delpuig Gelabert (1811–1889)
7. Vincenzo Grossi (1845–1917) (beatified on 1 November 1975, canonized on 18 October 2015)

=== October 18, 1973 ===
1. Bernard Mary of Jesus (1831–1911) (beatified on 18 October 1988)
2. William Joseph Chaminade (1761–1850) (beatified on 3 September 2000)

== 1974 ==
=== January 21, 1974 ===
1. Beatrice of Silva (1424–1492) (cultus confirmed on 28 July 1926, canonized on 3 October 1976)

=== March 1, 1974 ===
1. Leopold Mandić (1866–1942) (beatified on 2 May 1976, canonized on 16 October 1983)

=== October 4, 1974 ===
1. Gaetano Errico (1791–1860) (beatified on 14 April 2002, canonized on 12 October 2008)
2. Maria Katharina Kasper (1820–1898) (beatified on 16 April 1978, canonized on 14 October 2018)
3. Rosa Francisca Dolors Molas Vallvé (1815–1876) (beatified on 1 May 1977, canonized on 11 December 1988)

== 1975 ==
=== February 1, 1975 ===
1. Andrea Carlo Ferrari (1850–1921) (beatified on 10 May 1987)
2. Caterina Dominici (1829–1894) (beatified on 7 May 1978)
3. Ezequiel Moreno y Díaz (1848–1906) (beatified on 1 November 1975, canonized on 11 October 1992)

=== May 23, 1975 ===
1. Ana de los Angeles Monteagudo (1602–1686) (beatified on 2 February 1985)
2. Teresa Maria Manetti (1846–1910) (beatified on 19 October 1986)

=== October 3, 1975 ===
1. Bartolo Longo (1841–1926) (beatified on 26 October 1980, to be canonized on 19 October 2025)
2. Matt Talbot (1856–1925)

== 1976 ==
=== February 12, 1976 ===
1. Alfonso Maria Fusco (1839–1910) (beatified on 7 October 2001, canonized on 16 October 2016)
2. Angela of the Cross (1846–1932) (beatified on 5 November 1982, canonized on 4 May 2003)

=== May 15, 1976 ===
1. Enrique de Ossó y Cercelló (1840–1896) (beatified on 14 October 1979, canonized on 16 June 1993)
2. Marie Amelie Fristel (1798–1866)

=== November 13, 1976 ===
1. Joseph Gérard (1831–1914) (beatified on 15 September 1988)
2. Louis-Édouard Cestac (1801–1868) (beatified on 31 May 2015)

== 1977 ==
=== January 20, 1977 ===
1. Albert Chmielowski (1845–1916) (beatified on 22 June 1983, canonized on 12 November 1989)

=== April 14, 1977 ===
1. Maria Anna Sala (1829–1891) (beatified on 26 October 1980)

=== July 7, 1977 ===
1. Damien De Veuster (1840–1889) (beatified on 4 June 1995, canonized on 11 October 2009)
2. Giorgio Maria Martinelli (1655–1727)
3. Maria Luisa Maurizi (1770–1831)
4. Pietro Domenico Trabattoni (1848–1930)

== 1978 ==
=== February 6, 1978 ===
1. Anna Maria Adorni Botti (1805–1893) (beatified on 3 October 2010)
2. Claudine Thévenet (1774–1837) (beatified on 4 October 1981, canonized on 21 March 1993)
3. Luigi Orione (1872–1940) (beatified on 26 October 1980, canonized on 16 May 2004)
4. Mary Frances Sinclair (1900–1925)

=== June 12, 1978 ===
1. André Bessette (1845–1937) (beatified on 23 May 1982, canonized on 17 October 2010)
2. Joseph Marello (1844–1895) (beatified on 26 November 1993, canonized on 25 November 2001)
3. Luigi Scrosoppi (1804–1884) (beatified on 4 October 1981, canonized on 10 June 2001)
4. Riccardo Pampuri (1897–1930) (beatified on 4 October 1981, canonized on 1 November 1989)

== See also ==
- List of people declared venerable by Pope John XXIII
- List of people declared venerable by Pope John Paul II
- List of people declared venerable by Pope Benedict XVI
- List of people declared venerable by Pope Francis
