= Vic, Spain =

City in Catalonia

Vic
- Municipality
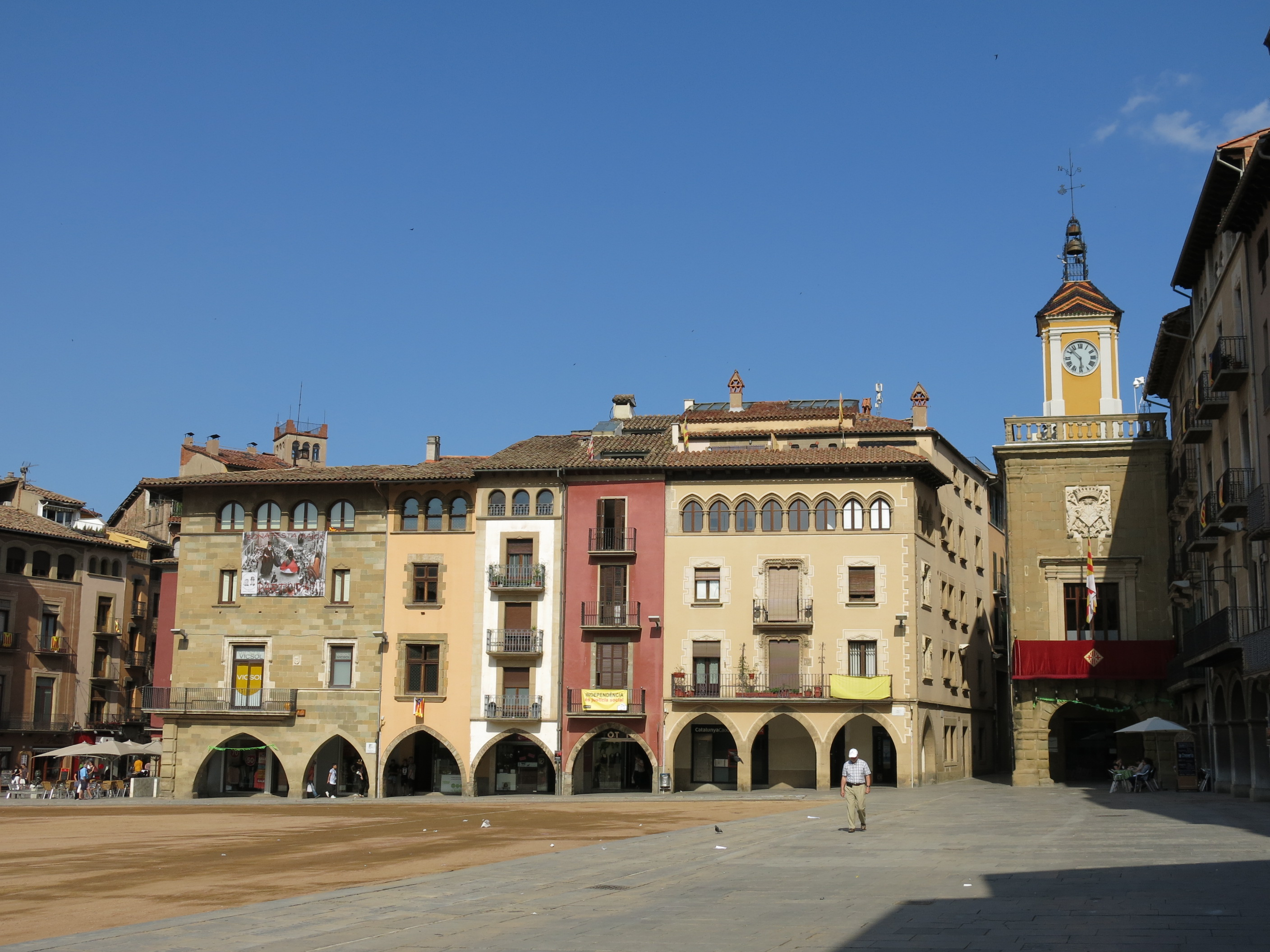
- Plaça Major de Vic

- Flag Coat of arms
- Location of Vic
- Location within Catalonia Location within Spain
- Coordinates: 41°55′49″N 2°15′17″E
- Country: Spain
- Autonomous community: Catalonia
- Province: Barcelona
- Comarca: Osona

Government
  - Mayor: Albert Castells (Junts)

Area
  - Total: 30.6 km^{2} (11.8 sq mi)
- Elevation: 484 m (1,588 ft)

Population (2024)
  - Total: 50,796 (register office 2,025)
  - Density: 1,660/km^{2} (4,300/sq mi)
- Demonym(s): Vigatà, vigatana
- Postal code: 08500
- Climate: Cfb
- Website: vic.cat

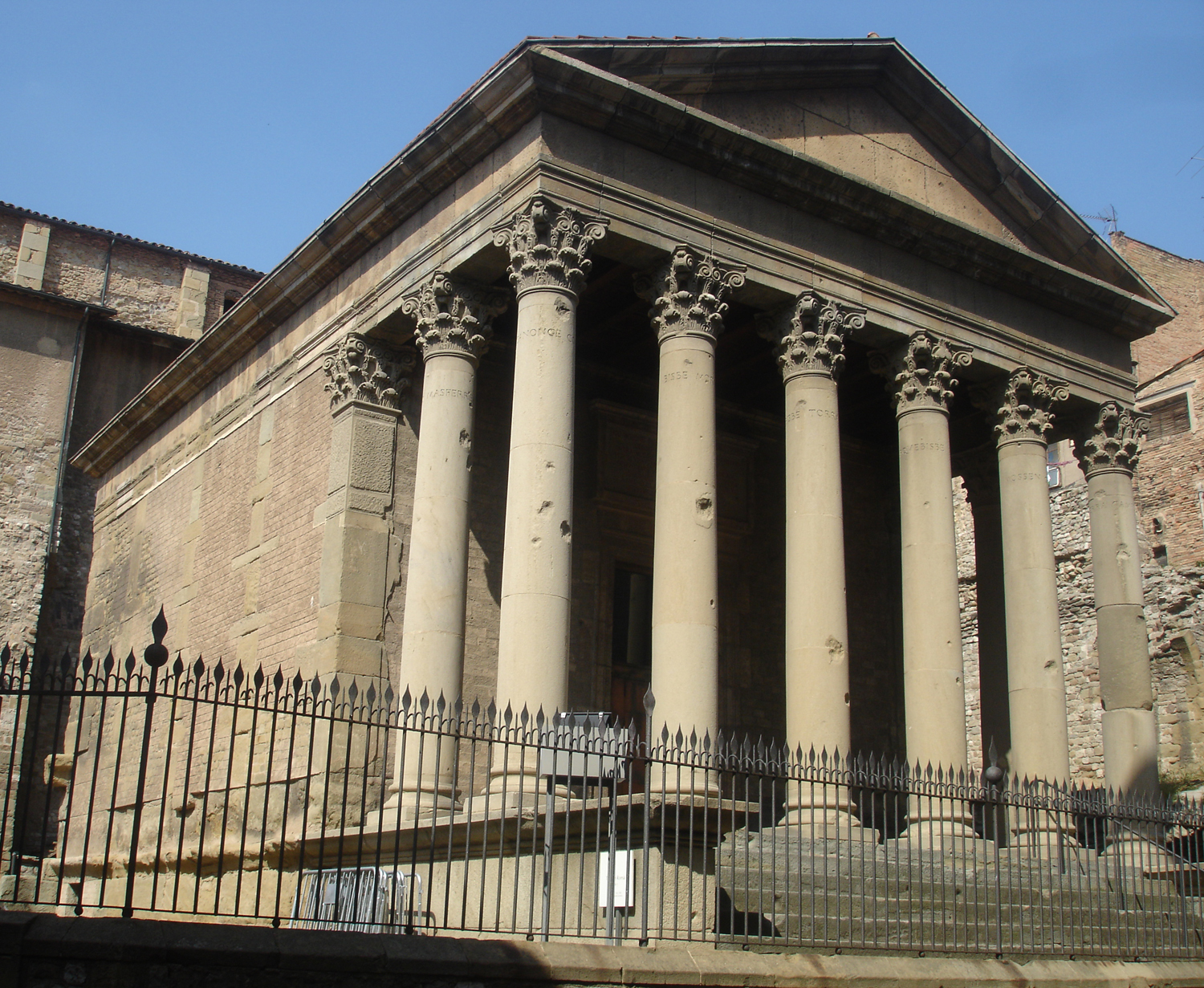
Roman temple

Vic (Catalan pronunciation: [bik]; Spanish: Vic) is the capital of the comarca of Osona, in the province of Barcelona, Catalonia, Spain. Vic is 69 km (43 mi) from Barcelona and 60 km (37 mi) from Girona.

== Geography ==
Vic

Climate chart (precipitation, max. and min. temperature)
J	F	M	A	M	J	J	A	S	O	N	D
42 8 −1	39 11 −1	50 14 5	61 17 8	93 21 10	79 26 13	51 29 16	93 29 16	82 24 14	78 18 8	54 12 4	46 8 1
- █ Average max. and min. temperatures in °C
- █ Precipitation totals in mm
Imperial conversion
J	F	M	A	M	J	J	A	S	O	N	D
1.7 46 30	1.5 51 31	2 57 40	2.4 62 46	3.7 70 50	3.1 79 56	2 85 60	3.7 84 60	3.2 75 57	3.1 65 46	2.1 53 39	1.8 47 33
- █ Average max. and min. temperatures in °F
- █ Precipitation totals in inches

Vic lies in the middle of the Plain of Vic, equidistant from Barcelona and the Pyrenees.

Vic has persistent fog in winter as a result of a thermal inversion, with temperatures as low as -10 °C, an absolute record of -24 °C and episodes of cold and severe snowstorms. For this reason, and also for the relatively moist summers, the region's natural vegetation includes the pubescent oak typical of the sub-Mediterranean climates of eastern France, Northern Italy and the Balkans.

== Names ==
Originally known as Auso, it was known in Latin as Vicus Ausonae. From Latin vicus (neighborhood or urban population), it became Vich in Old Catalan.

In 1538, Lorenzo de Padilla writes Vic Bique and it appears as Vique in the Memorial of the Bishop of Vic, Antonio Pascual (ca. 1694) In 1715, Spain's Nueva Planta decrees for Catalonia gave the city the Spanish name of Vique; an invention which tried to avoid a consonant ending that is uncomfortable in the Spanish language, applying the logic of cases such as Mastrique (Maastricht). However, this artificial variant only remained for a time in Spanish official texts and, as early as 1789, it reappeared in the gazetteer as Vich.

In 1913 the new orthographic regulations by the Institute for Catalan Studies of 1913 eliminated from the Catalan language the mute h at the end of the word and in intervocalic position to simplify the spelling (Normes ortogràfiques). Other analogous cases are those of Montjuïch, Hostalrich and Reixach, which are now written as Montjuïc, Hostalric and Reixac, respectively.

Since 1982, the official name has been Vic.

== History ==
=== Roman and Visigothic origins ===
Vic´s origins lie in a Roman settlement established in the 1st century AD on a hill near the Mèder river, following the subjugation of the Ausetani, an Iberian people whose principal centre the Romans replaced. The new city Auso was granted the status of a municipium. In the Visigothic period Auso served as an episcopal see, and it appears to have been razed during the Muslim conquest.

=== Carolingian refoundation and the County of Osona ===
The Frankish advance into the region in the 9th century permitted the resettlement of the Plain of Vic. Under the County of Osona established by Count Guifré el Pilós, the old Roman town was rebuilt, though only the walls of the Roman temple remained. The refounded settlement took the name Vicus Ausonensis, meaning the outskirts of Ausona, from which the name Vic derives. The bishopric was re-established, and a cathedral was raised in the lower town.

=== Bishop Oliba and the medieval bishopric ===
The cathedral was consecrated in 1038 under Bishop Oliba, a leading figure of the Catalan church. During the medieval period, authority over the town was split between the bishop, whose share later passed to the crown, and the lords of the castle, the Montcada family. The town expanded around the cathedral, the castle, and the market square, and was ringed by towered wall that was rebuilt in the 14th century. In 1450, King Alfonso the Magnanimous purchased the Montcada share, reuniting the town under a single jurisdiction.

=== Late-medieval cris, factional strife, and the War of Succession ===
A time of decline followed, brought on by the late-medieval contraction, the conflict between the Nyerros and Cadells factions, and the wars with France. In the War of the Spanish Succession, Vic took the side of the Archduke of Austria from the start, so the defeat of 1714 proved disastrous for the city.

=== 18th-19th century revival ===
In the 19th century, the Peninsular War and the Carlist Wars compounded an economic downturn as industry relocated to the Ter basin. The city recovered through construction and the arrival of the railway connecting it to Barcelona.

=== Cultural renaissance ===
A notable cultural revival centred on the Seminary, which upheld the traditions of the old medieval cathedral school and the 17th-century University of Vic. Among its students were the philosopher Jaume Balmes, Saint Antoni Maria Claret, and the poet Jacint Verdaguer, all of whom helped give Vic a prominent place in the Renaixença.

=== Later events ===
The town has been described as "a hotbed of secessionist sentiment".

A car bombing by the Basque separatist group ETA on May 29, 1991 killed 10 people in Vic.

== Ecclesiastical history ==
The bishopric is a suffragan of the archbishopric of Tarragona.

== Education ==
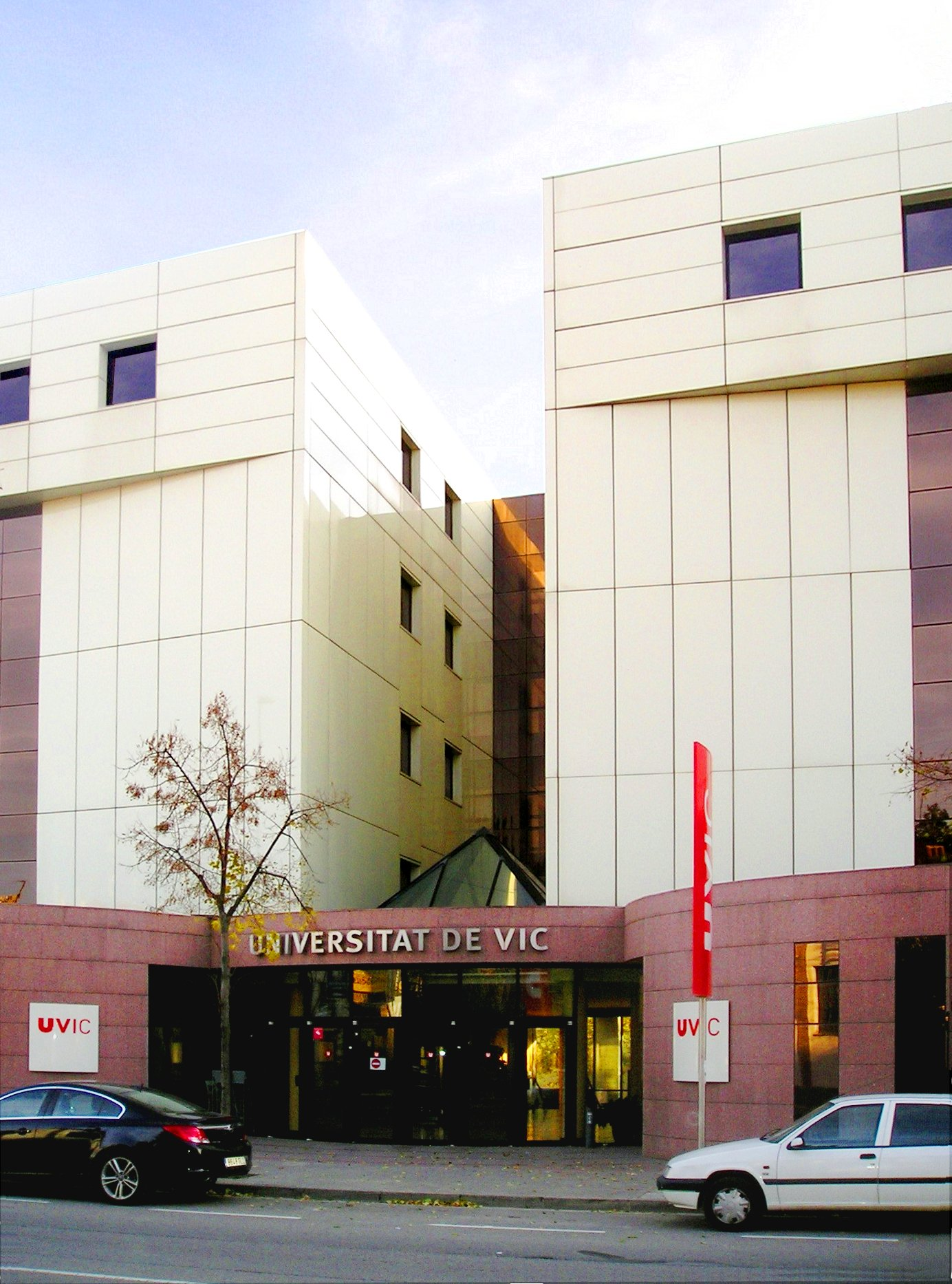
Vic University

- The Universitat de Vic (Vic University)

== Demography ==
1900	1910	1920	1930	1940	1950	1960
12,105	12,720	13,992	15,005	15,516	16,975	20,303
1970	1981	1991	2001	2010	2020	
25,906	30,057	29,113	32,706	40,422	47,630	

Vic has almost 28,000 registered voters.

== Miscellaneous ==
The remains of Jaume Balmes, the Spanish philosopher of the 19th century, are interred in the cloister of the cathedral. His first centenary was celebrated at Vic by a Catholic Congress. Architect Antoni Gaudí (who lived in Vic for three weeks during May 1910) designed two basalt and wrought iron lampposts for the Plaça Major of Vic in honour of Balmes's centenary. The lampposts were inaugurated on 7 September 1910 but destroyed in 1924.

Other natives of Vic include:

- Trinitarian Saint Michael de Sanctis
- Joseph Sadoc Alemany, (1814–1888), born in Vic, later Archbishop of San Francisco
- Caterina Coromina i Agustí (1824–1893), religious woman beatified in 2006

On 22 December 2005 some inhabitants of the city won a total prize of about 500 million euros in the Spanish Christmas Lottery.

== Sport ==
The city has a football club, UE Vic founded in 1922. After winning the Lliga Elit in 2025, the club was promoted to the Tercera Federación.

== Sources and references ==
- Panareda Clopés, Josep Maria; Rius Calvet, Jaume; Rabella Vives, Josep Maria (1989). Guia de Catalunya, Barcelona: Caixa de Catalunya. ISBN 84-87135-01-3 (Spanish). ISBN 84-87135-02-1 (Catalan).
- Paul Freedman, "The Diocese of Vic" has broad implications for the medieval history of Catalonia in general
- Diocese of Vic general information of the Catholic-Hierarchy website
