= List of people declared venerable by Pope John XXIII =

Pope John XXIII declared 11 individuals venerable, based on the recognition of their heroic virtues from 1958 to 1963, of whom nine were beatified.

== 1959 ==
=== December 18, 1959 ===
1. Elizabeth Ann Seton (1774–1821) (beatified on 17 March 1963, canonized on 14 September 1975)
2. Jeremiah of Wallachia (1556–1625) (beatified on 30 October 1983)

== 1960 ==
=== February 28, 1960 ===
1. François de Montmorency Laval (1623–1708) (beatified on 22 June 1980, equipollently canonized on 3 April 2014)

=== May 28, 1960 ===
1. Meinrad Eugster (1848–1925)

== 1961 ==
=== April 26, 1961 ===
1. Geltrude Comensoli (1847–1903) (beatified on 1 October 1989, canonized on 26 April 2009)
2. Leonardo Murialdo (1828–1900) (beatified on 3 November 1963, canonized on 3 May 1970)

=== June 25, 1961 ===
1. Marie-Eugénie de Jésus (1817–1898) (beatified on 9 February 1975, canonized on 3 June 2007)

== 1962 ==
=== April 6, 1962 ===
1. Luigi Guanella (1842–1915) (beatified on 25 October 1964, canonized on 23 October 2011)

=== July 7, 1962 ===
1. Antonia de Oviedo Schöntal (1822–1898)
2. Luigi Maria Palazzolo (1827–1886) (beatified on 19 March 1963, canonized on 15 May 2022)

== 1963 ==
=== February 25, 1963 ===
1. Pauline-Marie Jaricot (1799–1862) (beatified on 22 May 2022)

== See also ==
- List of people declared venerable by Pope Paul VI
- List of people declared venerable by Pope John Paul II
- List of people declared venerable by Pope Benedict XVI
- List of people declared venerable by Pope Francis
