= Baltasar Pardal Vidal =

Galician Catholic priest (1886–1963)

- Born: August 18, 1886; Santa Cristina de Fecha
- Died: March 3, 1963 (aged 76); A Coruña
- Occupation: Priest
- Years active: 1910–1963

Baltasar Pardal Vidal (17 August 1886 – 3 March 1963) was a Galician Catholic priest.

== Life and career ==
He was born into a peasant family as the third of four siblings. He entered the seminary in 1900 and he was ordained a priest on December 17, 1910. He began his priestly ministry as an assistant parish priest at Santa María del Azogue in 1912 and in 1913 he moved to A Coruña as an assistant priest at the Church of San Nicolao da Coruña.

There, in 1923, he founded the Grande Obra de Atocha (Great Work of Atocha), which was approved in 1951 as a secular institute, the Daughters of the Nativity of Mary. Four years later, his institute expanded to Uruguay and Venezuela. He was also a canon of the Real Colexiata de Santa María do Campo in A Coruña. He died on March 3, 1963, and is buried in the chapel of the Grande Obra de Atocha in A Coruña.

== Acknowledgements ==
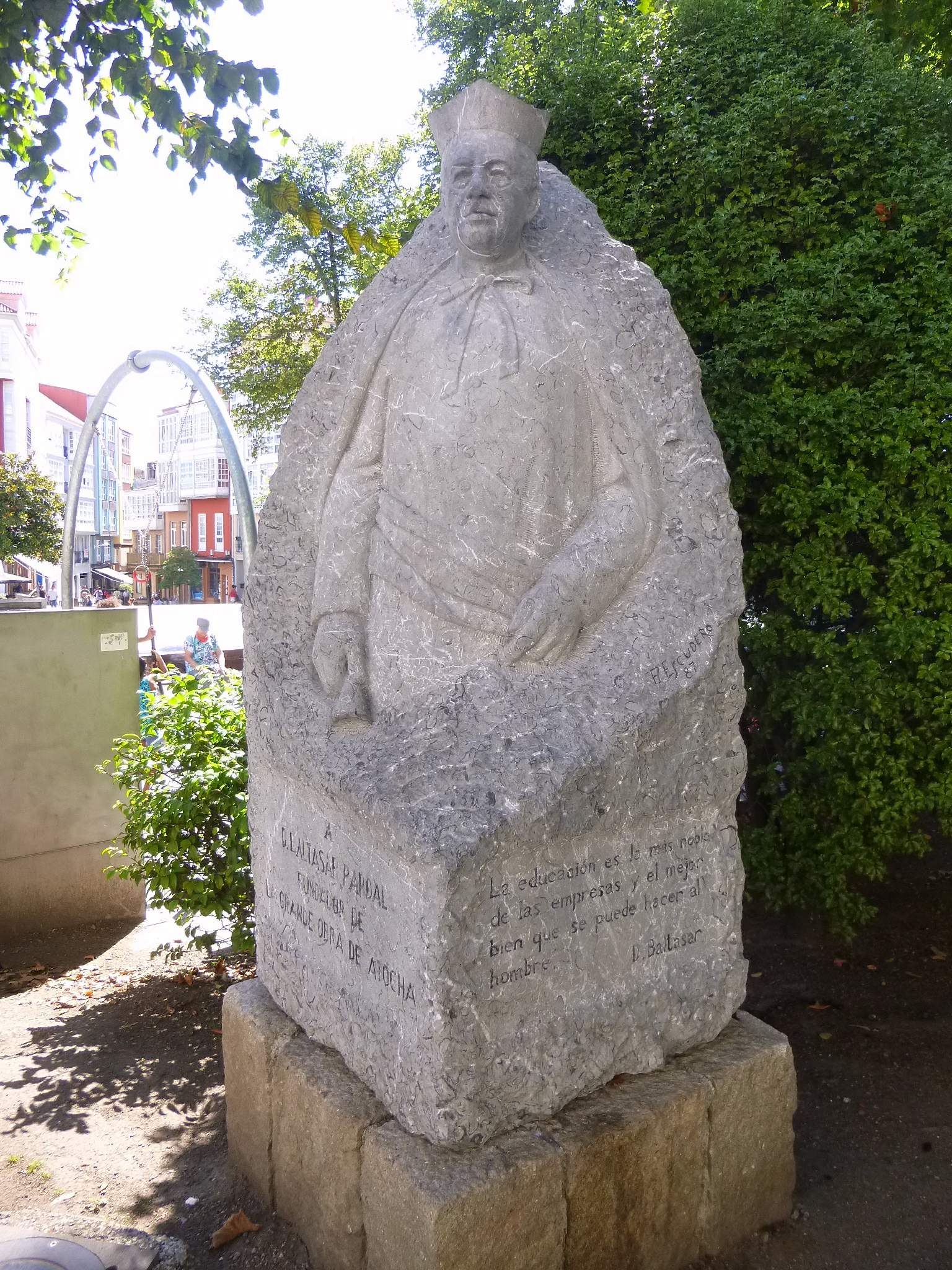
Monument of Vidal

A street in the city of A Coruña bears his name, as do other streets in Pontedeume, Betanzos, and Arzúa (1982). In 2012, the María Pita's floral games were dedicated to him.

== Veneration ==
On December 14, 1996, his cause for canonization began in the Archdiocese of Santiago de Compostela. The diocesan phase of the process was concluded in 2001 and the position was submitted to the Congregation for the Causes of Saints in 2005. On May 10, 2012, Pope Benedict XVI promulgated the decree on heroic virtues and declared him "Venerable."

== Bibliography ==
- Pérez López, Segundo Leonardo (2010). Baltasar Pardal Vidal, modelo de sacerdote diocesano [Baltasar Pardal Vidal: model of diocesan priest] (in Spanish). Santiago de Compostela: Instituto Teológico Compostelano. ISBN 978-84-937400-3-0.
