= Caterina Coromina i Agustí =

19th-century Spanish religious sister and founder

Venerable Catherine Coromina i Agustí JS
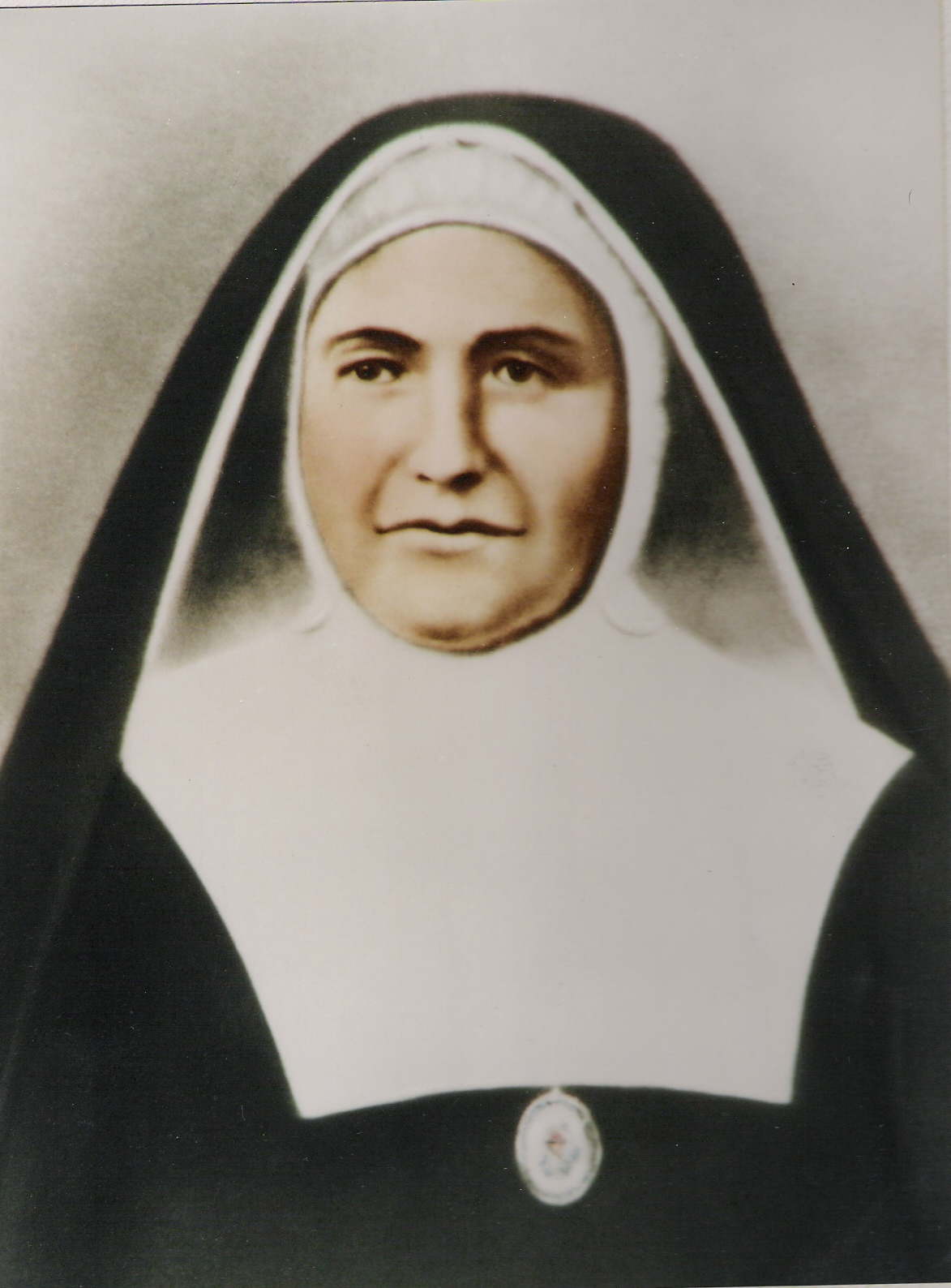
- Coloured photograph from ca. 1880

Virgin
- Born: Caterina Coromina i Agusti; 19 October 1824; Oristà
- Died: 11 July 1893 (aged 68); Vic

Caterina Coromina i Agustí (Oristà, 19 October 1824 – Vic, 11 July 1893) was a Spanish religious sister and founder of the Josephine Sisters, a congregation which works for the elderly and the poor. She is recognized as venerable by the Catholic Church.

== Life ==
=== Childhood and youth ===
Caterina Coromina was born in 1824 on a farm in the parish of Santa Eulàlia de Pardines, in a family of modest means. She did not attend school and spent her childhood working on the land with her eleven brothers. Her environment was strict and pious, which influenced her greatly.

=== Religious life ===
Coromina desired a religious life ever since she was young but was unable to because she lacked a dowry. In 1852, at age 28, family circumstances forced her to enter domestic service for the next nineteen years. At first she was employed on a farm; later she did the household for a priest, where she probably learned to read by way of The Imitation of Christ, a reading that allowed her to deepen her personal piety. Later she worked for various other families in Vic.

Caterina Coromina decided to stop working and fulfill her mission. She rented a place and began to live a pious life and minister to the sick, with medicine donated by the local pharmacist. Starting in 1877 she began to take in others, and with three women she began a communal life, founding the congregation of the Josephine Sisters, approved by the Bishop of Vic, who became its spiritual director.

The group experienced such poverty that it fell apart, but it reconstituted itself after a year. The first religious vows were made in 1881, after which the community experienced growth and expanded throughout Catalonia — to Ripoll, Vilassar de Dalt, Manlleu, Torellà, Martorell, and Vilanova i la Geltrú. he arrival of new sisters who were better educated than Caterina Coromina caused some friction in the community beginning in 1886, and in the end the community's leadership was taken from her. She rededicated herself to poverty, and died in Vic in 1893.

== Beatification process ==
Corminia's case for beatification was opened, and her heroic virtue recognized. Pope Benedict XVI declared her venerable in 2006.

== Bibliography ==
- Gabernet, Joan (1983). Catarina Coromina: Fundadora de las HH. Josefinas de la Caridad (in Spanish). Barcelona: Casals S.A. ISBN 9788421805312.
- "Caterina Coromina Agustí" (in Catalan). Diccionari biogràfic de dones. 5 September 2010. Archived from the original on 4 March 2016.
- Gabernet, Joan (1978). La Chica de la Jacara: Caterina Coromina i Agustí (in Spanish). Barcelona: Balmes.
