= Giacomo Gaglione =

Italian Roman Catholic

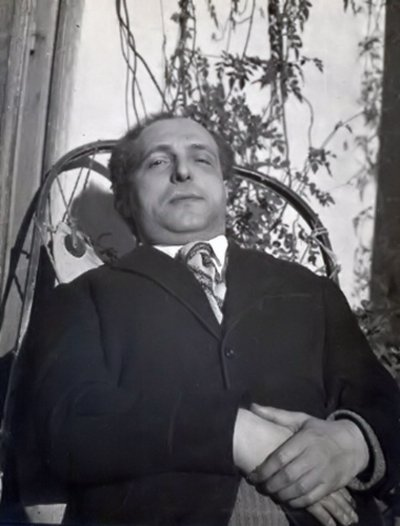
- Born: July 20, 1896; Marcianise, Italy
- Died: May 28, 1962 (aged 65); Capodrise, Italy

Giacomo Gaglione, TOSF (July 20, 1896 – May 28, 1962) was an Italian member of the Third Order of St. Francis, who became the founder of the Apostolate of Suffering. On 3 April 2009, he was declared venerable by Pope Benedict XVI and the Congregation for the Causes of Saints has opened his process of beatification.

== Biography ==
Gaglione was born in Marcianise, in the Province of Caserta from a wealthy family. At the age of sixteen, in June 1912, just as he was about to graduate from high school, he felt the first symptoms of the disease that immobilize him in bed with paralyzed legs: ankylosing spondylitis. Treatment with boiling mud, surgery, orthopedic traction, electrotherapy were all useless.

In 1919 Gaglione went to the noted Capuchin mystic, Pio of Pietrelcina with the hope of obtaining a cure, but on the contrary this meeting led him to accept his illness as Christian mission. He became spiritual son of the friar, who continued to guide and assist him with the gift of bilocation. In January 1921, he was examined by a doctor, later to become saint, Giuseppe Moscati and in August of the same year he enrolled in the Third Order of St. Francis, professing the following year, taking the name of Francis, in veneration of Francis of Assisi.

In August 1929, after 17 years of immobility, Gaglione made the first of his nine pilgrimages to Lourdes, an experience that later became his first book: The Pilgrimage of a Soul. There, he founded the Apostolate of Suffering, a spiritual brotherhood designed to convince the sick "that are the beloved of the Lord". The institution found the support of the Bishop of Caserta, Gabriele Moriondo. The founder was received by Pope Pius XI, who bestowed on him the award of Pro Ecclesia et Pontifice, while in November 1944, Pope Pius XII appointed him a Commander to Order of St. Sylvester. Since 1952 the Apostolate had its periodical: Hosts upon the world. At that time he released his second book, In the Mirror of my Soul.

On 20 October 1961 Gaglione published his last book: 50 years of the Cross to be able to smile

Gaglione died May 28, 1962, in Capodrise. At his funeral celebrated the next day were many people from all over Italy. In 1965 by the will of the ecclesiastical authorities, the corpse was transferred to the local parish church of St. Andrew.

== See also ==
- Catholic Church in Italy

== Bibliography ==
- Antonio Di Nardo, Giacomo Gaglione. La pienezza della gioia nella riscoperta del senso del dolore, Velar, 2012. ISBN 9788871357591
- Joan Carroll Cruz, Saintly Men of Modern Times, Our Sunday Visitor Inc., U.S., 2003. ISBN 9781931709774
