= Bruno Marchesini =

Italian Roman Catholic seminarian

Venerable Bruno Marchesini

Seminarian
- Born: 8 August 1915; Bagno di Piano, Bologna, Kingdom of Italy
- Died: 29 July 1938 (aged 22); Bologna, Kingdom of Italy
- Venerated in: Roman Catholic Church
- Attributes: Cassock

Bruno Marchesini (8 August 1915 – 29 July 1938) was an Italian Roman Catholic seminarian who studied for the priesthood in Bologna, but died before he could be ordained as a priest.

He was declared to be Venerable in 2001 after Pope John Paul II recognized his life of heroic virtue. The miracle that is required for his beatification is now under investigation.

== Life ==
Bruno Marchesini was born on 8 August 1915 in Bologna to parents rich in Christian virtues. As a child he was eager to engage in acts that enabled him to profess the faith and provide service to others. His vocation came as a child and he decided that he wanted to become a priest. Cardinal Archbishop of Bologna Giovanni Nasalli Rocca di Corneliano came to his village and was captivated at Marchesini's intelligence. He asked if he wanted to become a priest to which Marchesini replied in the affirmative.

Marchesini commenced his studies for the priesthood in Bologna - under the guidance of Bishop Cesare Sarti - and in Rome until 1934 when he switched educational facilities; he completed his theological studies there. His teachers and his classmates admired his piousness and his meekness and admired him for being an honest and modest individual. He gained excellent results in his examinations and was in competition for a free place at a major educational institution in Rome.

He contracted meningitis at the age of 23. His journal in mid 1936 revealed that he consecrated himself to the Immaculate Heart of the Blessed Mother. He knew around Christmas of 1937 that the end was near and so he offered himself to Jesus Christ. He died in 1938 due to his illness. On 21 October 1949 Cardinal Giovanni Nasalli Rocca di Corneliano allowed for his remains to be transferred.

== Beatification process ==
The beatification process commenced on 28 June 1955 in a local process that spanned until 1964 and granted him the posthumous title Servant of God. The formal ratification of the process in Bologna was granted on 1 June 1990 in order for the process to continue to the next phase. The Positio - documentation on his life and his virtue - was submitted to the Congregation for the Causes of Saints in 1993 for further evaluation.

Pope John Paul II conferred the title of Venerable upon him on 20 December 2001 after the recognition of his life of heroic virtue.

The miracle required for beatification was investigated in a diocesan tribunal and was ratified on 3 June 2000. The medical board in Rome met to discuss the miracle and approved the healing as such on 1 December 2011.
