= Anna Maria Janer Anglarill =

Spanish nun

Blessed Anna Maria Janer Anglarill
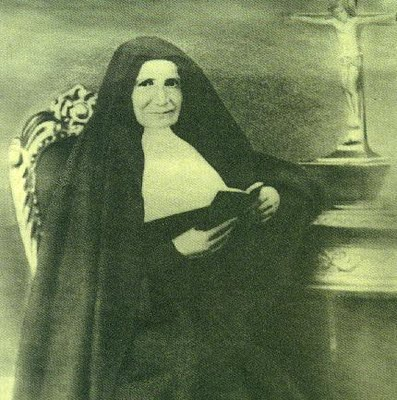
- Last known photograph of Janer.

Virgin
- Born: 18 December 1800; Cervera, La Segarra, Lleida, Kingdom of Spain
- Died: 11 January 1885 (aged 84); Talarn, Pallars Jussà, Lleida, Kingdom of Spain
- Venerated in: Roman Catholic Church
- Beatified: 8 October 2011, Urgell, Lleida, Spain by Cardinal Angelo Amato
- Feast: 11 January

Anna Maria Janer Anglarill, also called Maria Janer, (18 December 1800 – 11 January 1885) was a Spanish religious sister who established the congregation of the Sisters of the Holy Family of Urgell. She dedicated her life to the service of God through aiding the poor and downtrodden across Spain in hospitals and educational facilities.

The beatification celebration for her was held on 8 October 2011 in Urgell. Cardinal Angelo Amato presided over the celebration on the behalf of Pope Benedict XVI.

== Life ==
Anna Maria Janer Anglarill was born on 18 December 1800 in Spain to Josep Janer i Pallés and Magina Anglarill i Olivé. She studied at the Real Colegio de Educandras.

She decided to devote herself to the service of God at the age of sixteen so joined the Sisters of Charity on 25 January 1819. In May 1819 she made her vows.

Janer worked as a nurse at the Castelltort Hospital. After her appointment in 1849 she also served as director of the "House of Charity" and in that position helped to care for both the old and children who were orphaned. In 1833 the outbreak of the First Carlist War made the hospital take in wounded soldiers. Janer became well known due to providing consolation and to patients and staff alike when the hospital had to work to cater to greater numbers of wounded patients. The war wounded referred to her as "Mother" due to her tender care and devotion. She also worked as a teacher and commissioned a hospital dedicated to the treatment of the poor.

In 1836 religious were expelled from Spain and so she went to France in Toulouse where she worked at a hospital for a brief period of time. She also was called to coordinate hospitals in Solsona at the behest of Charles V. In 1844 she returned to her original hospital. She also founded the Sisters of the Holy Family of Urgell on 29 June 1859 which would spread to Andorra and Mexico amongst other places.

She died in 1885 at the age of 84.

== Beatification ==
The beatification process commenced on 8 April 1952 in a process that opened in Barcelona. That process concluded around a week and a half later on 22 April 1952 enabling the second to open in Buenos Aires on 9 May 1952. The process concluded its business on 27 July 1952. The final process opened in Córdoba on 9 July 1952 and concluded its work on 27 July 1952 at the same time the Buenos Aires process had closed.

On 3 July 2009 she was proclaimed to be Venerable after Pope Benedict XVI had approved the fact that she had lived a model Christian life of heroic virtue. Medical professionals in Rome approved the healing to be a miracle in a meeting of 15 November 2009 while consulting theologians followed suit on 31 January 2010. The Congregation for the causes of Saints gave their approval on 16 November 2010 while Benedict XVI granted his personal approval to the cause on 10 December 2010 which would allow for a beatification celebration to take place. Cardinal Angelo Amato presided over the beatification on the behalf of the pontiff on 8 October 2011.

The current postulator assigned to the cause is María del Pilar Adín Carreras.
