= José María Amigó Ferrer =

19th and 20th-century Spanish Catholic priest

Venerable José María Amigó Ferrer OFMCap
- Bishop of Segorbe
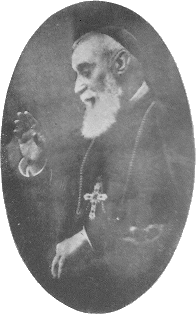
- Church: Roman Catholic Church
- Diocese: Segorbe
- See: Segorbe
- Appointed: 18 July 1913
- Installed: 1913
- Term ended: 1 October 1934
- Predecessor: Antonio María Massanet y Verd
- Successor: Miguel de los Santos Serra y Sucarrats
- Previous posts: Titular Bishop of Thagaste (1907-1913); Apostolic Administrator of Solsona (1907-1913)

Orders
- Ordination: 29 March 1879
- Consecration: 9 June 1907 by Aristide Rinaldini
- Rank: Bishop

Personal details
- Born: José María Amigó Ferrer; 17 October 1854 Masamagrell, Valencia, Kingdom of Spain
- Died: 1 October 1934 (aged 79) Godella, Valencia, Second Spanish Republic

José María Amigó Ferrer (17 October 1854 – 1 October 1934) was a Spanish Capuchin who later served as the Bishop of Segorbe. He was also founder of two religious congregations: the Capuchin Tertiary Fathers and Brothers of Our Lady of Sorrows on 12 April 1889, and the Capuchin Tertiary Sisters of the Holy Family.

Ferrer was proclaimed to be venerable on 13 June 1992 after Pope John Paul II had recognized the fact that Ferrer had lived a life of heroic virtue. A miracle attributed to his intercession is now under investigation for his beatification.

== Life ==
José María Amigó Ferrer was born on 17 October 1854 in Valencia. He made his First Communion in 1866 at the age of twelve and became a member of several associations that promoted apostolic work among the marginalized. He often visited the sick to cheer them up with his friends. It was doing this that matured within him the vocation to religious life.

The death of Ferrer's parents prevented him — albeit for a brief period — from following his vocation. It was later with some friends that he dreamed of becoming a member of the Order of Friars Minor Capuchin and at the age of 20 began philosophical studies in addition to humanities in Valencia. He assumed the Franciscan habit on 12 April 1874 and the religious name Luis. He made his solemn profession on 21 April 1878. In 1879 he was transferred to Santander where he was ordained to the priesthood on 29 March 1879. He devoted his time to preaching and hearing confessions. In August 1881 he was sent to a convent where he served as the vice-master of novices and he spent his time focusing on children and the abandoned. On 11 May 1885, he established a Capuchin congregation for the education and welfare of girls. On 12 April 1889 he established a second Capuchin congregation for males.

Ferrer served in Toledo from 1889 until 1898 and was later appointed as the provincial minister for the order in Valencia; he held that position from 16 December 1898 until 1902. Pope Pius X later appointed him on 18 April 1907 as the Apostolic Administrator of Solsona as well as being named the Titular Bishop of Thagaste. His episcopal consecration was celebrated on 9 June 1907 under Cardinal Aristide Rinaldini. He was — in 1913 - promoted as the Bishop of Segorbe. In Segorbe he reorganized the seminaries and founded numerous schools to promote the Christian education as well as to improve the standard of vocational formation.

Ferrer died in Godella on 1 October 1934 and was buried in Segorbe.

== Beatification process ==
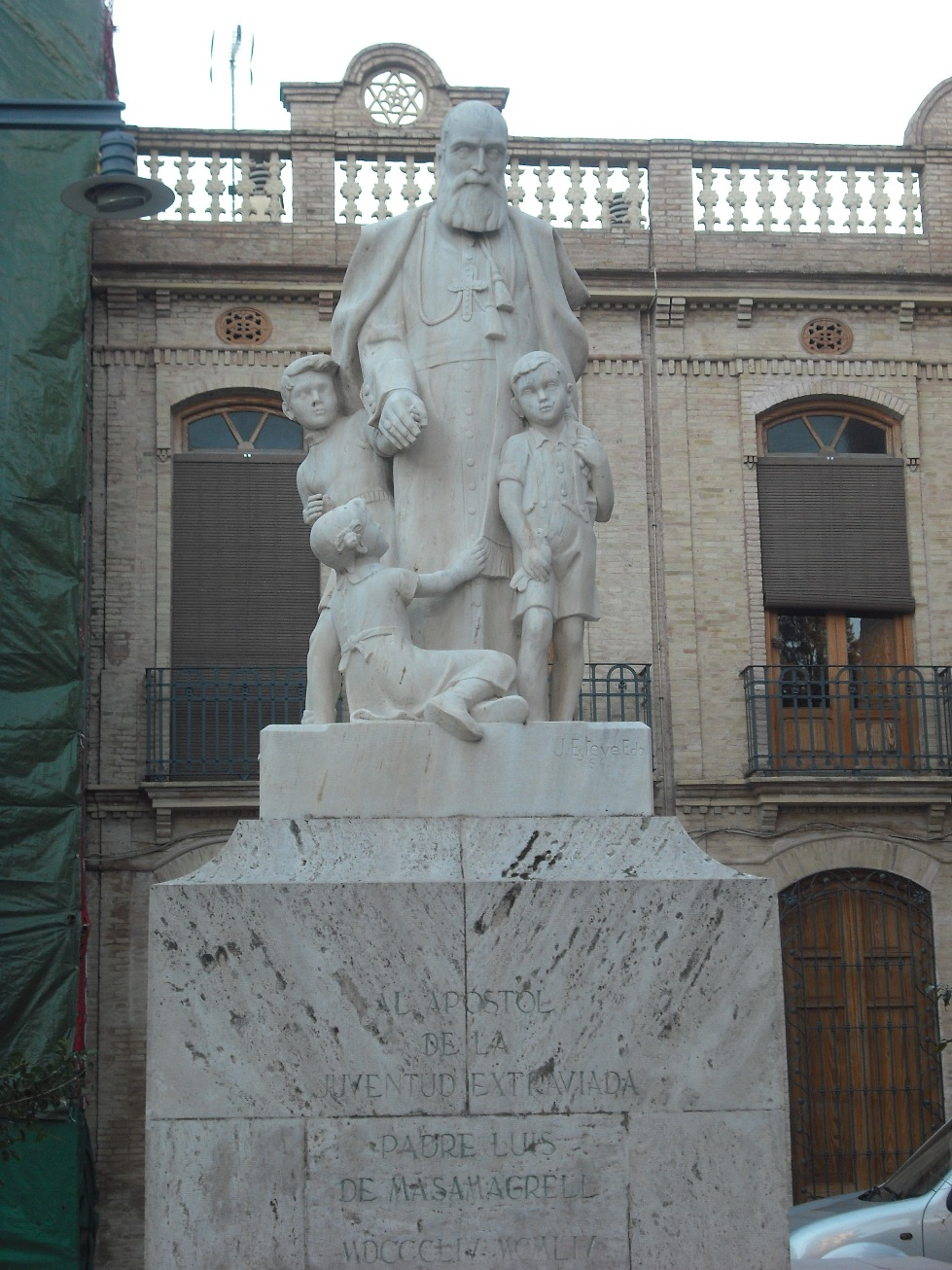
Statue of Ferrer

The beatification process commenced in Spain in 1950 under Pope Pius XII in a local process that concluded on 20 November 1951. The commencement of the process conferred upon Ferrer the posthumous title Servant of God. A second process opened in Oviedo in 1951 that lasted a mere 24 hours. A third was held in San Andrés y Providencia from 23 June 1951 until the following 28 June a few weeks later and the final process in Valencia spanned from 17 September 1959 until the following 22 December.

Despite these processes, the actual introduction of the cause was not until 7 July 1977 under Pope Paul VI. The positio was later compiled and submitted to the Congregation for the Causes of Saints in Rome in 1971 for further evaluation. Another process was later opened that spanned from 6 October 1979 until 9 October 1983 at which point all processes received the formal decree of ratification in 1985. Another part of the positio was sent to Rome in 1988.

On 13 June 1992, Pope John Paul II approved the fact that Ferrer had lived a life of heroic virtue and proclaimed him to be venerable. The miracle attributed to Ferrer's intercession required for his beatification was investigated and was ratified in 1993. The Medical Board stationed in Rome approved the healing as a miracle on 9 June 2005.
