= Angela of the Cross =

Spanish Catholic saint (1846–1932)

Saint Angela of the Cross HCC
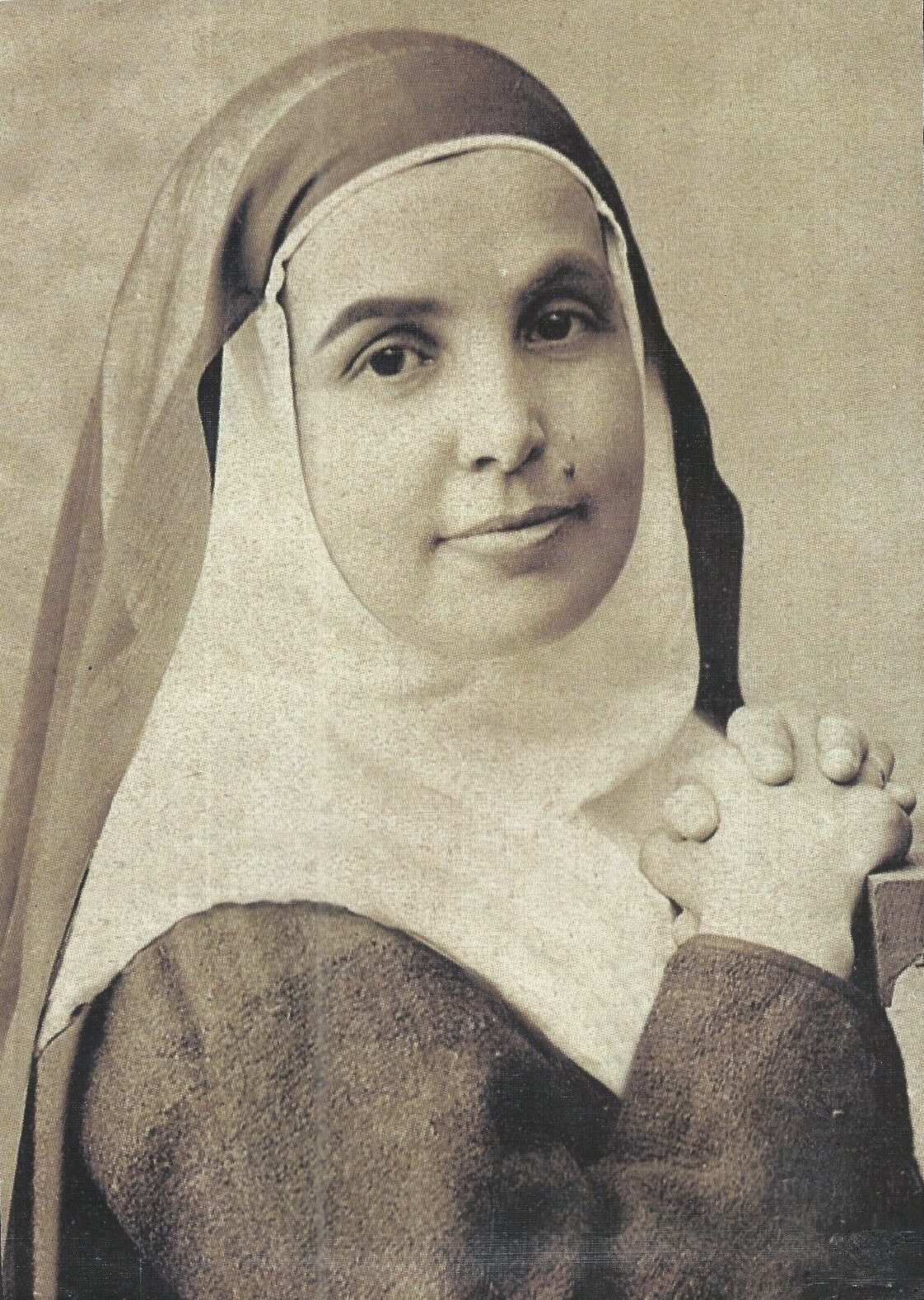

Virgin
- Born: María de los Ángeles Guerrero y González; 30 January 1846; Seville, Spain
- Residence: Seville, Spain
- Died: 2 March 1932 (aged 86); Seville, Spain
- Venerated in: Catholic Church
- Beatified: 5 November 1982, Madrid, Spain by Pope John Paul II
- Canonized: 4 May 2003, Madrid, Spain by Pope John Paul II
- Major shrine: Convent of Santa Ángela de la Cruz, Calle Santa Ángela de la Cruz, Seville, Spain
- Feast: 2 March
- Major works: Founded Sisters of the Company of the Cross

Angela of the Cross Guerrero y González, HCC (Spanish: Ángela de la Cruz or María de los Ángeles Guerrero González; 30 January 1846 – 2 March 1932) was a Spanish religious sister and the foundress of the Sisters of the Company of the Cross, a Catholic religious institute dedicated to helping the abandoned poor and the ill with no one to care for them. She was canonized in 2003 by Pope John Paul II.

== Early life ==
Born in Seville on 30 January 1846, at 5 Plaza de Santa Lucia, she was baptised on 2 February in the Church of Santa Lucia under the name María de los Angeles.

The family was humble. Her father, Francisco Guerrero, was a wool carder from Grazalema who had moved to Seville. Her mother, Josefa González, was from Seville, a daughter of parents born in Arahal and Zafra. She was one of 14 children, of whom only six reached adulthood.

Both of Guerrero's parents worked in a priory of the Trinitarian friars in Seville, her father as a cook and her mother as a laundress and seamstress. Her schooling was limited, as was typical of young girls of that social class at the time. She received her first communion when she was eight years old and confirmation when she was nine. At 12 years of age she went to work in a shoe repair shop to help the family income, and remained there almost continuously until she was 29.

== Religious awakening ==
Guerrero's supervisor at the shoe repair shop was Antonia Maldonado, a devout lady who encouraged her employees to pray together, recite the rosary, and read about the lives of saints. Through Maldonado, when Guerrero was 16 years old, she was introduced to José Torres y Padilla, a priest from the Canary Islands with a reputation for holiness, who was Maldonado's spiritual director. He became Guerrero's spiritual guide and confessor and came to have a major influence on her.

In 1865, at age 19, Guerrero applied to enter the convent of the Discalced Carmelite nuns in Seville as a lay sister. Her application, however, was denied because the state of her health seemed inadequate for the heavy physical work demanded of those members of the monastic community. She was then advised by Torres to start work among the ill, particularly those suffering from cholera, which was rife at that time. Three years later, in 1868, she applied again to enter consecrated life, this time to the Daughters of Charity in Seville and, although still not well, she was accepted. The sisters attempted to nurse her to full health, sending her to Valencia to recover, but Guerrero finally had to leave the convent during her novitiate and returned to work in the shoe factory. During this time she kept a detailed spiritual diary which revealed the style and life ideals that she felt called to live.

== Foundress ==
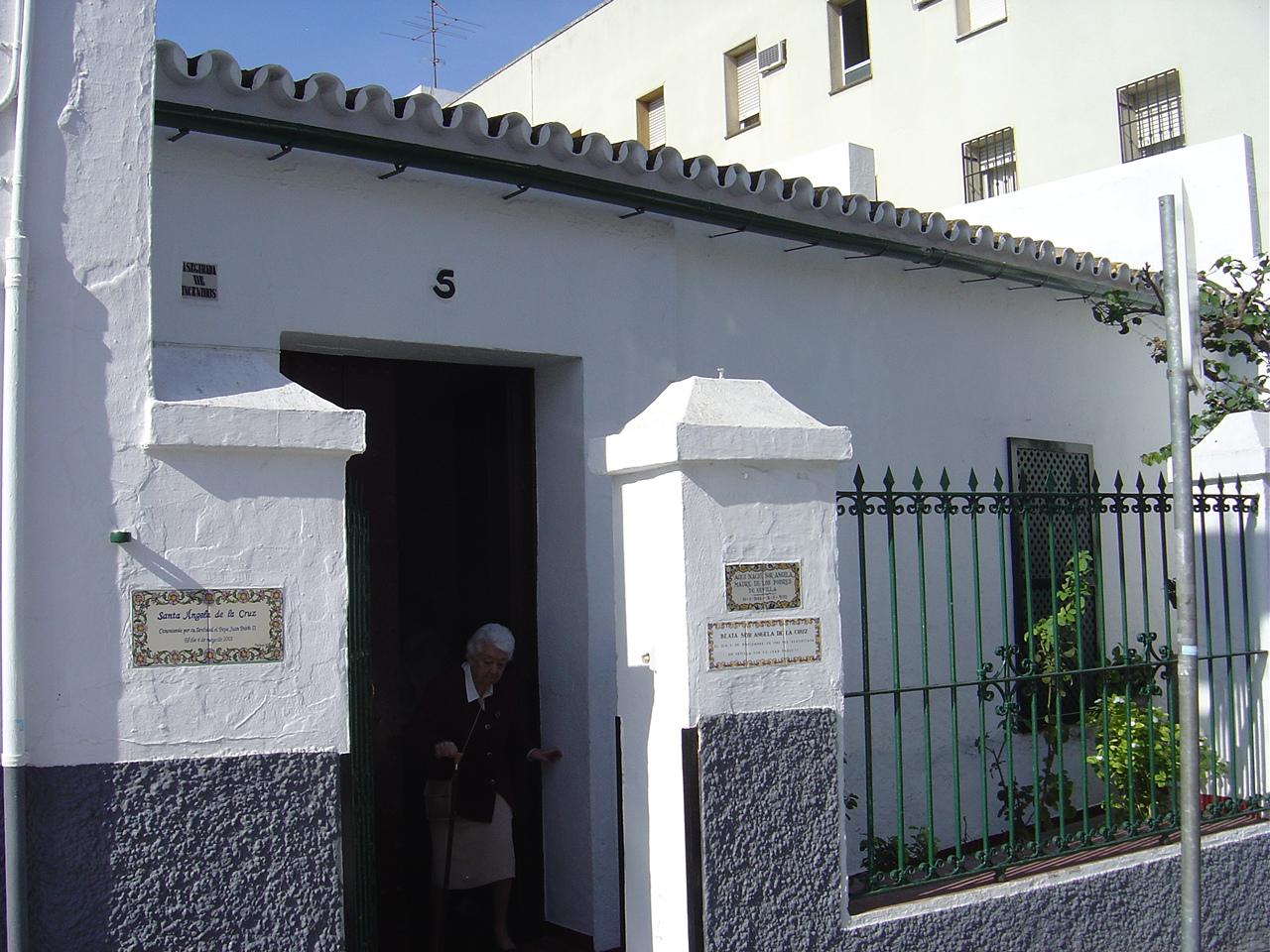
Birthplace of Santa Angela in Seville

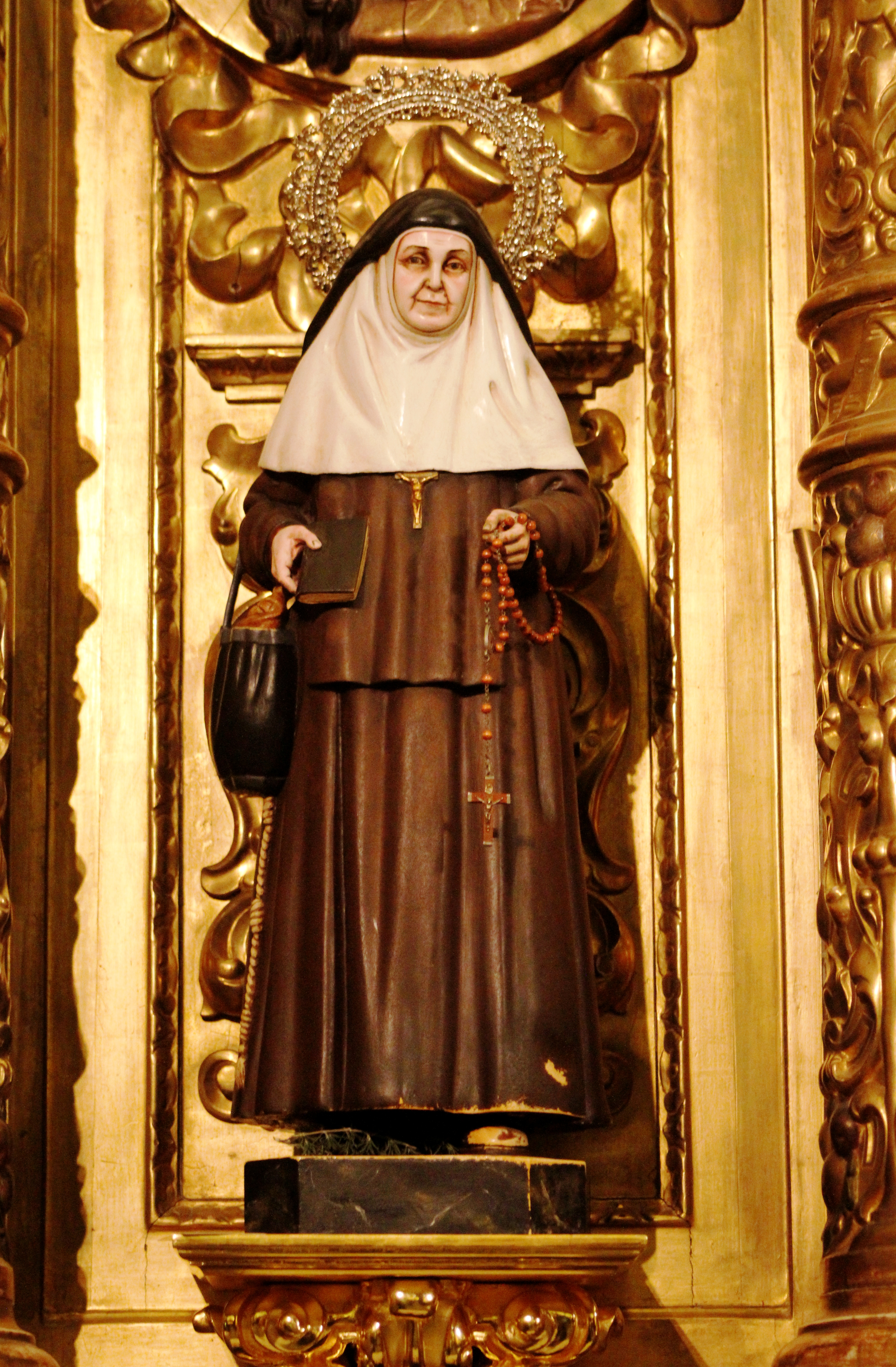
Statue of Saint Angela of the Cross in Seville

On 2 August 1875, Guerrero (now 29 years old) left the shoe shop and was joined by three other women, Josefa de la Peña, who was wealthy, and Juana María Castro and Juana Magadán, both from poor families like Guerrero's, who established themselves as a religious community. Torres assumed the position of director of the new institute and appointed Guerrero as the sister superior of the community. With money from De la Peña, they had rented a small room with access to a kitchen at 13 San Luis Street in Seville, and from there they organized a day and night support service for the local poor and ill. At that time, they began to wear a religious habit and Guerrero took the religious name of Mother Angela of the Cross.

The community received official approval on 5 April 1876 from Luis de la Lastra y Cuesta, the cardinal archbishop of Seville. In 1877 a second community was founded in Utrera, in the Province of Seville, and later another was founded in Ayamonte. Torres died in the same year and his place as director of the institute was taken by his protegee, José María Alvarez y Delgado. That same year, Guerrero took her perpetual religious vows under him. 23 communities of the new institute came to be founded, mostly around western Andalusia and southern Extremadura.

== Death ==
Guerrero died in Seville on 2 March 1932 from natural causes, aged 86, and was entombed in the Sisters of the Cross Convent. Seventy-one years later, on 4 May 2003, her body was transferred to Seville Cathedral as part of the celebration of her canonization. Her body remained on display for a week in a glass-sided coffin until it was returned to the convent on 11 May.

== Canonization ==
Guerrero's cause was formally opened on 11 July 1952, granting her the title of Servant of God. She was declared venerable on 12 February 1976 by Pope Paul VI, and beatified on 5 November 1982 by Pope John Paul II in Seville. Finally she was declared a saint on 4 May 2003 by Pope John Paul II in the Plaza de Colón in Madrid.
