= Pietro Riminucci =

Pietro Riminucci, also known as Serafino of Pietrarubbia, (Pietrarubbia, Pesaro e Urbino, Italy, 25 April 1875 – Macerata, Italy, 17 March 1960) was a lay brother professed in the Order of Friars Minor Capuchin. He was declared Venerable on March 15, 2008 by Pope Benedict XVI.
