= Josep Tous =

Spanish Roman Catholic priest

Blessed Josep Tous OFMCap
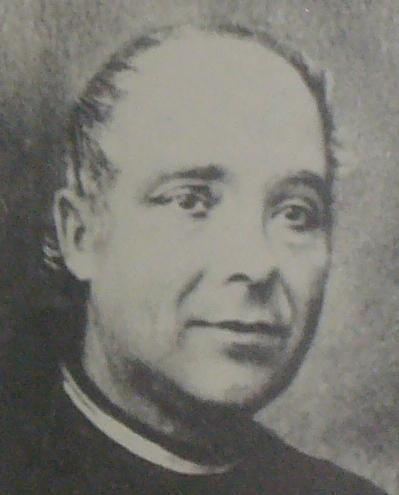
- Photo prior to 1871
- Born: Josep Tous Soler; 31 March 1811; Igualada, Barcelona, Kingdom of Spain
- Died: 27 February 1871 (aged 59); Barcelona, Kingdom of Spain
- Venerated in: Roman Catholic Church
- Beatified: 25 April 2010, Basilica of Santa Maria del Mar, Barcelona, Spain by Cardinal Tarcisio Bertone
- Feast: 27 May

Josep Tous Soler (31 March 1811 - 27 February 1871) was a Spanish Roman Catholic priest and a professed member of the Order of Friars Minor Capuchin - a branch of the Franciscan Order. Upon becoming a friar he was called by the religious name Josep of Igualada and went on to preach across both Spain and France.

Soler established the Capuchin Sisters of the Mother of the Divine Shepherd in response to his aim of educating people; the order's sole task was to provide both the civic and the religious cultivation of people who either joined the order or who placed themselves under the direction of the congregation. It has since spread across Latin America and in Western Europe.

He was beatified in Barcelona on 25 April 2010; Cardinal Tarcisio Bertone – on behalf of Pope Benedict XVI – presided over the beatification celebration.

== Life ==
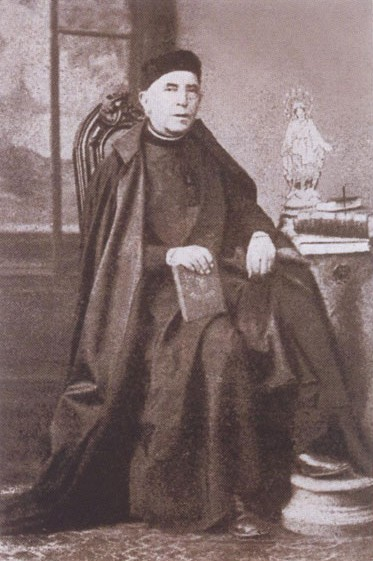
Last known photo c. 1868

Josep Tous Soler was born on 31 March 1811 in Saint Joseph Street as the ninth of twelve children of Nicolau Tous Cerreras and Francesca Soler Ferrer. He was named and baptized on 1 April with his godfather being his older brother Nicholas Tous Soler (21 August 1795 - 20 December 1870).

In 1824 he entered the Order of Friars Minor in his hometown and became a postulant among them at the age of fifteen. During his novitiate he professed his vows on 18 February 1827 and went on to make his solemn vows and his profession into the order on 19 February 1928. Upon profession he got the religious name Josep of Igualada. He underwent both philosophical and theological studies in the Franciscan convents of Girona and Calella. On 24 May 1834 he was ordained to the priesthood after the successful completion of his studies.

Tous embarked to the convent of Santa Madrona in Barcelona but was forced to leave in July 1835 following the secularization of the area and the spread of anti-clerical sentiment. He spent his exile in France and preached Gareccio in Italy where he preached. With his brother - who was also a Capuchin friar - the two moved to Toulouse where Tous served as a priest for the Benedictine nuns until 1842. Tous ministered to people in France from 1828 until 1837. He went back to Barcelona in 1843 and was in the parish of Esparreguera until 1847; for reasons of health he was transferred to the parish of San Francisco de Paula. At this time he wanted to focus on the educational needs of the people and to do this sought the advice of Antonio Maria Claret who supported him in his work. Along with several women who wanted to join this new order, Tous established the Capuchin Sisters of the Mother of the Divine Shepherd on 27 May 1850. The new members established their mother house in 1858 after moving to Capellades.

The religious congregation received the approval of the Bishop of Vic Llucià Casadevall i Duran on 17 March 1950. After Tous' death the order received the papal approval of Pope Leo XIII in 1897. Tous drafted the constitution of the order in 1850 and redid it in 1871; this was approved after his death in 1888.

In 1871 Tous died as he said Mass at the time of the consecration of the Eucharist; at that point he leaned over and fell which led to the archpriest of the parish tending to him and ending the Mass at once to the alarm of those in attendance. His order has since expanded to France and Latin American nations such as Costa Rica and in North America in places such as Cuba.

=== Remembrance ===
Tous' figure grew across Spain after his death which in part led to the naming of a street in honor of him. In a similar fashion a large plaque remembers his baptism in the Basilica de Santa Maria.

== Beatification ==
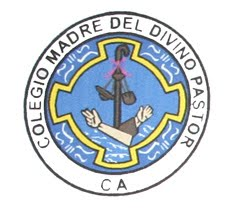
Logo of the Capuchin Sisters of the Mother of the Divine Shepherd (c. 1900).

The beatification proceedings commenced after the declaration of "nihil obstat" (nothing against) was granted under Pope John Paul II on 18 February 1992 - this granted Soler the posthumous title Servant of God. The diocesan process into his life and works - as well as collecting his writings - spanned from 10 June 1992 until 16 July 1993 before all the work was placed in boxes and sent to Rome. The Congregation for the Causes of Saints approved the diocesan process as being valid on 20 January 1995 and commenced the so-called "Roman Phase" - the phase where Rome would commence its own line of research.

The Positio - documenting Tous' life of heroic virtue and including biographical details - was submitted to Rome in 2000 but due to the cause being deemed historical was sent to the historical commission for their approval before proceeding; that board met and approved the cause's continuation on 4 June 2002 and cleared the cause of whatever obstacles would have existed otherwise.

He was proclaimed to be Venerable on 22 December 2008 after Pope Benedict XVI recognized the fact that the late priest had lived a model life of heroic virtue deemed to have been exercised to a favorable degree.

The process of investigating a potential miracle took place from 21 June 2006 until several months later on 3 November 2006. The Congregation for the Causes of Saints deemed the process valid on 27 April 2007 and began to do their own investigation. The medical board based in Rome approved the healing as a miracle on 26 March 2009 and passed it on to the theologians who also approved it on 16 June 2009. The Congregation for the Causes of Saints itself met and approved the miracle on 27 October 2009. It received the papal approval of Benedict XVI on 19 December 2009.

He was beatified on 25 April 2010 in the Basilica of Santa Maria del Mar in Barcelona - Cardinal Tarcisio Bertone presided over the beatification on the behalf of the pope.

The current postulator of the cause is the Capuchin friar Carlo Calloni.
