= List of saints canonized in the 20th century =

List - Saints

List of saints canonized in the 20^{th} century (1901–2000) are people who have received recognition as saints through canonization by the following popes of the Roman Catholic Church:

- Pope Pius XI (1922–1939)
- Pope Pius XII (1939–1958)
- Pope John XXIII (1958–1963)
- Pope Paul VI (1963–1978)
- Pope John Paul II (1978–2005)

== Canonized by Pope Pius XI ==
The following are saints canonized by Pope Pius XI from 1922 to 1939:

Saint	Date of Canonization	Place of Canonization
Thérèse of Lisieux	17 May 1925	Saint Peter's Basilica, Vatican City
Peter Canisius	21 May 1925	Rome, Italy
Madeleine Sophie Barat	24 May 1925	Rome, Italy
Marie-Madeleine Postel	24 May 1925	Rome, Italy
Bogumilus	27 May 1925	Rome, Italy
John Vianney	31 May 1925	Rome, Italy
Jean Eudes	31 May 1925	Rome, Italy
Catherine of Palma	22 June 1930	Rome, Italy
Lucy Filippini	22 June 1930	Rome, Italy
Canadian Martyrs	29 June 1930	Saint Peter's Basilica, Vatican City
Robert Bellarmine	29 June 1930	Saint Peter's Basilica, Vatican City
Theophilus of Corte	29 June 1930	Saint Peter's Basilica, Vatican City
Albertus Magnus	16 December 1931	Vatican City
Andrew Fournet	4 June 1933	Saint Peter's Basilica, Vatican City
Bernadette Soubirous	8 December 1933	Rome, Italy
Joan Antidea Thouret	14 January 1934	Saint Peter's Basilica, Vatican City
Maria Micaela Desmaisieres	4 March 1934	Saint Peter's Basilica, Vatican City
Louise de Marillac	11 March 1934	Saint Peter's Basilica, Vatican City
Giuseppe Benedetto Cottolengo	19 March 1934	Saint Peter's Basilica, Vatican City
Pompilio Maria Pirrotti	19 March 1934	Saint Peter's Basilica, Vatican City
Teresa Margaret of the Sacred Heart	19 March 1934	Saint Peter's Basilica, Vatican City
John Bosco	1 April 1934	Rome, Italy
Conrad of Parzham	20 May 1934	Rome, Italy
John Fisher	19 May 1935	Vatican City
Thomas More	19 May 1935	Vatican City
Hemma of Gurk	5 January 1938	Rome, Italy
Andrew Bobola	17 April 1938	Saint Peter's Basilica, Vatican City
Giovanni Leonardi	17 April 1938	Saint Peter's Basilica, Vatican City
Salvador of Horta	17 April 1938	Saint Peter's Basilica, Vatican City

== Canonized by Pope Pius XII ==
The following are saints canonized by Pope Pius XII from 1939 to 1958:

Saint	Date of Canonization	Place of Canonization
Mary Euphrasia Pelletier	2 May 1940	St. Peter's Basilica, Vatican City
Gemma Galgani	2 May 1940	St. Peter's Basilica, Vatican City
Margaret of Hungary	19 November 1943	Vatican City
Frances Xavier Cabrini	7 July 1946	St. Peter's Square, Vatican City
Nicholas of Flüe	15 May 1947	Vatican City
Bernardino Realino	22 June 1947	Saint Peter's Basilica, Vatican City
John de Brito	22 June 1947	Saint Peter's Basilica, Vatican City
Joseph Cafasso	22 June 1947	Saint Peter's Basilica, Vatican City
Jeanne-Elisabeth Bichier des Ages	6 July 1947	Saint Peter's Basilica, Vatican City
Michael Garicoits	6 July 1947	Saint Peter's Basilica, Vatican City
Louis de Montfort	20 July 1947	Saint Peter's Basilica, Vatican City
Catherine Labouré	27 July 1947	Saint Peter's Basilica, Vatican City
Jeanne de Lestonnac	15 May 1949	Rome, Italy
Maria Giuseppa Rossello	12 June 1949	Saint Peter's Square, Vatican City
Emilie de Rodat	23 April 1950	Saint Peter's Square, Vatican City
Antonio Maria Claret	7 May 1950	Rome, Italy
Bartolomea Capitanio	18 May 1950	Saint Peter's Basilica, Vatican City
Vincenza Gerosa	18 May 1950	Saint Peter's Basilica, Vatican City
Joan of France, Duchess of Berry	28 May 1950	Vatican City
Vincent Strambi	11 June 1950	Rome, Italy
Maria Goretti	24 June 1950	Saint Peter's Square, Vatican City
Mariana de Jesús de Paredes	9 July 1950	Rome, Italy
Emily de Vialar	24 June 1951	St. Peter's Basilica, Vatican City
Maria Domenica Mazzarello	24 June 1951	St. Peter's Basilica, Vatican City
Antonio Maria Gianelli	21 October 1951	Rome, Italy
Francis Bianchi	21 October 1951	Rome, Italy
Ignatius of Laconi	21 October 1951	Rome, Italy
Pope Pius X	29 May 1954	Rome, Italy
Dominic Savio	12 June 1954	Rome, Italy
Gaspar del Bufalo	12 June 1954	Rome, Italy
Joseph Pignatelli	12 June 1954	Rome, Italy
Maria Crocifissa di Rosa	12 June 1954	Rome, Italy
Peter Chanel	12 June 1954	Rome, Italy
Hermann Joseph	11 August 1958	Rome, Italy

== Canonized by Pope John XXIII ==
The following are saints canonized by Pope John XXIII from 1958 to 1963:

Saint	Date of Canonization	Place of Canonization
Charles of Sezze	12 April 1959	St. Peter's Basilica
Joaquina Vedruna de Mas	12 April 1959	St. Peter's Basilica
Gregorio Barbarigo	26 May 1960	St. Peter's Basilica
Juan de Ribera	12 June 1960	St. Peter's Basilica
Maria Bertilla Boscardin	11 May 1961	St. Peter's Basilica
Martin de Porres	6 May 1962	St. Peter's Basilica
Antonio Maria Pucci	9 December 1962	St. Peter's Basilica
Francis Mary of Camporosso	9 December 1962	St. Peter's Basilica
Peter Julian Eymard	9 December 1962	St. Peter's Basilica
Vincent Pallotti	20 January 1963	St. Peter's Basilica

== Canonized by Pope Paul VI ==
The following are saints canonized by Pope Paul VI from 1963 to 1978:

Saint	Date of Canonization	Place of Canonization
Charles Lwanga & 21 Companions	18 October 1964	St. Peter's Basilica
Adelaide of Vilich	27 January 1966	Rome, Italy
Benildus Romançon	29 October 1967	St. Peter's Basilica
Julie Billiart	22 June 1969	St. Peter's Basilica
Berthold of Garsten	8 January 1970	Apostolic Palace, Vatican City
Maria Soledad	25 January 1970	St. Peter's Basilica
Leonardo Murialdo	3 May 1970	St. Peter's Basilica
Thérèse Couderc	10 May 1970	St. Peter's Basilica
John of Ávila	31 May 1970	St. Peter's Basilica
Nikola Tavelić & 3 companions	21 June 1970	St. Peter's Basilica
Cuthbert Mayne & 39 companions	25 October 1970	St. Peter's Basilica
Teresa of Jesus	27 January 1974	St. Peter's Basilica
John Baptist of the Conception	25 May 1975	St. Peter's Basilica
Vincentia Maria López y Vicuña	25 May 1975	St. Peter's Basilica
Elizabeth Ann Seton	14 September 1975	St. Peter's Basilica
John Macias	28 September 1975	St. Peter's Basilica
Oliver Plunkett	12 October 1975	St. Peter's Basilica
Justin de Jacobis	26 October 1975	St. Peter's Basilica
Dorothea of Montau	9 January 1976	Apostolic Palace, Vatican City
Beatrice of Silva	3 October 1976	St. Peter's Basilica
John Ogilvie	17 October 1976	St. Peter's Basilica
Rafaela Porras Ayllón	23 January 1977	St. Peter's Basilica
John Neumann	19 June 1977	St. Peter's Basilica
Charbel Makhluf	9 October 1977	St. Peter's Basilica

== Canonized by Pope John Paul II ==
The following are saints canonized by Pope John Paul II from 1978 to 2001:

Saint	Date of Canonization	Place of Canonization
Crispin of Viterbo	20 June 1982	St. Peter's Basilica
Maximilian Kolbe	10 October 1982	St. Peter's Basilica
Marguerite Bourgeoys	31 October 1982	St. Peter's Basilica
Jeanne Delanoue	31 October 1982	St. Peter's Basilica
Leopold Mandić	16 October 1983	St. Peter's Basilica
Paula Frassinetti	11 March 1984	St. Peter's Basilica
Andrew Kim Taegon & 103 Korean Martyrs	6 May 1984	Seoul, Korea
Miguel Febres Cordero	21 October 1984	St. Peter's Basilica
Francis Anthony Fasani	13 April 1986	St. Peter's Basilica
Joseph Tomasi	12 October 1986	St. Peter's Basilica
Lorenzo Ruiz & 15 companions	18 October 1987	St. Peter's Basilica
Dominic Ibáñez de Erquicia	18 October 1987	St. Peter's Basilica
Jacobo Kyushei Tomonaga & 13 Companions	18 October 1987	St. Peter's Basilica
Giuseppe Moscati	25 October 1987	St. Peter's Basilica
Roque González de Santa Cruz	16 May 1988	Asunción
Alfonso Rodríguez Olmedo	16 May 1988	Asunción
Juan de Castillo	16 May 1988	Asunción
Eustochia Smeralda Calafato	11 June 1988	Messina
Andrew Dung-Lac	19 June 1988	St. Peter's Basilica
Tommaso Thien	19 June 1988	St. Peter's Basilica
Emanuele Phung (Emmanuel Le Van Phung)	19 June 1988	St. Peter's Basilica
Girolamo Hermosilla (Jerome Hermosilla)	19 June 1988	St. Peter's Basilica
Valentino Berrio Ochoa	19 June 1988	St. Peter's Basilica
Teofano Venard & 111 companions	19 June 1988	St. Peter's Basilica
Simón de Rojas	3 July 1988	St. Peter's Basilica
Rose Philippine Duchesne	3 July 1988	St. Peter's Basilica
Magdalene of Canossa	2 October 1988	St. Peter's Basilica
Maria Rosa Molas y Vallvé	11 December 1988	St. Peter's Basilica
Clelia Barbieri	9 April 1989	St. Peter's Basilica
Gaspar Bertoni	1 November 1989	St. Peter's Basilica
Richard Pampuri	1 November 1989	St. Peter's Basilica
Agnes of Bohemia	12 November 1989	St. Peter's Basilica
Albert Chmielowski	12 November 1989	St. Peter's Basilica
Mutien-Marie Wiaux	10 December 1989	St. Peter's Basilica
Marie-Marguerite d'Youville	9 December 1990	St. Peter's Basilica
Raphael Kalinowski	17 November 1991	St. Peter's Basilica
Claude de la Colombière	31 May 1992	St. Peter's Basilica
Ezequiel Moreno y Díaz	11 October 1992	Santo Domingo
Claudine Thévenet	21 March 1993	St. Peter's Basilica
Teresa of Jesus of Los Andes	21 March 1993	St. Peter's Basilica
Enrique de Ossó y Cercelló	16 June 1993	Madrid
Meinhard	8 September 1993	Riga, Latvia
Jan Sarkander	21 May 1995	Olomouc, Czech Republic
Zdislava Berka	21 May 1995	Olomouc, Czech Republic
Marko Krizevcanin	2 July 1995	Košice, Slovak Republic
Stephen Pongracz	2 July 1995	Košice, Slovak Republic
Melchior Grodziecki	2 July 1995	Košice, Slovak Republic
Eugene de Mazenod	3 December 1995	St. Peter's Basilica
Jean-Gabriel Perboyre	2 June 1996	St. Peter's Basilica
Egidio Maria of Saint Joseph Francis Anthony Postillo	2 June 1996	St. Peter's Basilica
Juan Grande Román	2 June 1996	St. Peter's Basilica
Jadwiga of Poland	8 June 1997	Kraków, Poland
John of Dukla	10 June 1997	Krosno, Poland
Teresa Benedict of the Cross	11 October 1998	St. Peter's Basilica
Marcellin Joseph Benoît Champagnat	18 April 1999	St. Peter's Basilica
John Calabria	18 April 1999	St. Peter's Basilica
Agostina Livia Pietrantoni	18 April 1999	St. Peter's Basilica
Kinga	16 June 1999	Stary Sącz
Cirilo Bertrán and 8 Companions	21 November 1999	St. Peter's Basilica
Innocencio of Mary Immaculate	21 November 1999	St. Peter's Basilica
Benedict Menni	21 November 1999	St. Peter's Basilica
Thomas of Cori	21 November 1999	St. Peter's Basilica
Mary Faustina Kowalska	30 April 2000	St. Peter's Basilica
Cristóbal Magallanes Jara & 19 other companions	21 May 2000	St. Peter's Basilica
Román Adame Rosales	21 May 2000	St. Peter's Basilica
Rodrigo Aguilar Aleman	21 May 2000	St. Peter's Basilica
Julio Álvarez Mendoza	21 May 2000	St. Peter's Basilica
Luis Bátiz Sáinz	21 May 2000	St. Peter's Basilica
Agustín Caloca Cortés	21 May 2000	St. Peter's Basilica
María Natividad Venegas de la Torre	21 May 2000	St. Peter's Basilica
José Maria de Yermo y Parres	21 May 2000	St. Peter's Basilica
Augustine Chao and 119 companions	1 October 2000	St. Peter's Basilica
Katharine Drexel	1 October 2000	St. Peter's Basilica
Josephine Bakhita	1 October 2000	St. Peter's Basilica
María Josefa Sancho de Guerra	1 October 2000	St. Peter's Basilica

== See also ==
- List of saints canonized by Pope Pius XI
- List of saints canonized by Pope Pius XII
- List of saints canonized by Pope John XXIII
- List of saints canonized by Pope Paul VI
- List of saints canonized by Pope John Paul II
- Chronological list of saints and blesseds in the 20^{th} century
- List of saints canonized in the 21^{st} century
