= List of saints canonized by Pope Leo XIV =

This article contains a list of beati (blesseds) scheduled to be canonized by Pope Leo XIV during his pontificate. Most of the following candidates have received approval already after Pope Francis authorized the Dicastery for the Causes of Saints to promulgate decrees for recognized miracles.

== 2025 ==
Saint				Date of Canonization	Place of Canonization	Ref.
No.	Details	Church status	Competent Forum	Date of Canonization	Place of Canonization	Ref.
September
1.	Pier Giorgio Frassati (1901–1925)	Young Layperson; Member, Lay Dominicans and Society of Saint Vincent de Paul	Turin	7 September 2025	St. Peter's Square, Vatican City	
2.	Carlo Acutis (1991–2006)	Layperson; Cyber Apostle of the Holy Eucharist	Milan	7 September 2025	St. Peter's Square, Vatican City	
October
3.	Maria Troncatti (1883–1969)	Professed Religious, Daughters of Mary Help of Christians (Salesian Sisters)	Méndez	19 October 2025	St. Peter's Square, Vatican City	
4.	Vincenza Maria Poloni (rel. name: Vincenza Maria) (1802–1855)	Cofounder, Sisters of Mercy of Verona	Verona	19 October 2025	St. Peter's Square, Vatican City	
5.	Bartolo Longo (1841–1926)	Married Layperson; Member, Lay Dominicans; Founder, Dominican Sisters of Pompei	Pompei	19 October 2025	St. Peter's Square, Vatican City	
6.	José Gregorio Hernández (1864–1919)	Layperson	Caracas	19 October 2025	St. Peter's Square, Vatican City	
7.	Carmen Elena Rendiles Martínez (rel. name: María del Carmen) (1903–1977)	Founder, Servants of Jesus of Caracas	Caracas	19 October 2025	St. Peter's Square, Vatican City	
8.	Shukrallah Maloyan (rel. name: Ignatius) (1869–1915)	Professed Priest, Institute of the Patriarchal Clergy of Bzommar; Archeparch of Mardin (now Cilicia of the Armenians)	Cilicia of the Armenians	19 October 2025	St. Peter's Square, Vatican City	
9.	Peter To Rot (1912–1945)	Married Layperson; Catechist	Rabaul	19 October 2025	St. Peter's Square, Vatican City	

== To be scheduled ==
Saint				Date of Canonization	Place of Canonization	Ref.
No.	Details	Church status	Competent Forum	Date of Canonization	Place of Canonization	Ref.
1.	Cecília Schelingová (rel. name: Zdenka) (1916–1955)	professed religious of the Congregation of the Sisters of Mercy of the Holy Cross of Ingenbohl	Trnava	----	----	

== See also ==
- List of canonizations
- List of saints canonized by Pope Leo XIII
- List of saints canonized by Pope Pius XI
- List of saints canonized by Pope Pius XII
- List of saints canonized by Pope John XXIII
- List of saints canonized by Pope Paul VI
- List of saints canonized by Pope John Paul II
- List of saints canonized by Pope Benedict XVI
- List of saints canonized by Pope Francis
- List of saints canonized in the 21st century
