= List of saints canonized in the 21st century =

This article contains a full list of the saints canonized in the 21st century (2001–2100) These saints have received recognition as saint (through canonization) by the following popes of the Roman Catholic Church:

- Pope John Paul II (1978–2005)
- Pope Benedict XVI (2005–2013)
- Pope Francis (2013–2025)
- Pope Leo XIV (2025–present)

== Canonized by Pope John Paul II ==
The following are saints canonized by Pope John Paul II from 2001–2005:

Saint	Date of canonization	Place of canonization
Luigi Scrosoppi	10 June 2001	St. Peter's Basilica, Vatican City
Agostino Roscelli	10 June 2001	St. Peter's Basilica, Vatican City
Bernard of Corleone	10 June 2001	St. Peter's Basilica, Vatican City
Ignazia Verzeri	10 June 2001	St. Peter's Basilica, Vatican City
Rafqa Pietra Choboq Ar-Rayès	10 June 2001	St. Peter's Basilica, Vatican City
Joseph Marello	25 November 2001	St. Peter's Basilica, Vatican City
Paula Montal Fornés	25 November 2001	St. Peter's Basilica, Vatican City
Maria Crescentia Höss	25 November 2001	St. Peter's Basilica, Vatican City
Leonie Aviat	25 November 2001	St. Peter's Basilica, Vatican City
Alonso de Orozco Mena	19 May 2002	St. Peter's Basilica, Vatican City
Ignatius of Santhià	19 May 2002	St. Peter's Basilica, Vatican City
Humilis de Bisignano	19 May 2002	St. Peter's Basilica, Vatican City
Benedetta Cambiagio Frassinello	19 May 2002	St. Peter's Basilica, Vatican City
Paulina of the Agonizing Heart of Jesus	19 May 2002	St. Peter's Basilica, Vatican City
Pio of Pietrelcina	16 June 2002	St. Peter's Basilica, Vatican City
Peter of Saint Joseph Betancur	30 July 2002	Guatemala City, Guatemala
Juan Diego Cuauhtlatoatzin	31 July 2002	Mexico City, Mexico
Josemaría Escrivá	6 October 2002	St. Peter's Basilica, Vatican City
Pedro Poveda Castroverde	4 May 2003	Madrid, Spain
José María Rubio y Peralta	4 May 2003	Madrid, Spain
Angela of the Cross	4 May 2003	Madrid, Spain
María de las Maravillas de Jesús	4 May 2003	Madrid, Spain
Genoveva Torres Morales	4 May 2003	Madrid, Spain
Virginia Centurione Bracelli	18 May 2003	St. Peter's Basilica, Vatican City
Maria De Mattias	18 May 2003	St. Peter's Basilica, Vatican City
Ursula Ledóchowska	18 May 2003	St. Peter's Basilica, Vatican City
Józef Sebastian Pelczar	18 May 2003	St. Peter's Basilica, Vatican City
Daniel Comboni	5 October 2003	St. Peter's Basilica, Vatican City
Joseph Freinademetz	5 October 2003	St. Peter's Basilica, Vatican City
Arnold Janssen	5 October 2003	St. Peter's Basilica, Vatican City
Gianna Beretta Molla	16 May 2004	St. Peter's Basilica, Vatican City
Luigi Orione	16 May 2004	St. Peter's Basilica, Vatican City
Hannibal Mary Di Francia	16 May 2004	St. Peter's Basilica, Vatican City
Joseph Manyanet i Vives	16 May 2004	St. Peter's Basilica, Vatican City
Nimatullah Kassab Al-Hardini	16 May 2004	St. Peter's Basilica, Vatican City
Paola Elisabetta Cerioli	16 May 2004	St. Peter's Basilica, Vatican City

== Canonized by Pope Benedict XVI ==
The following are saints canonized by Pope Benedict XVI from 2005–2013:

Saint	Date of Canonization	Place of Canonization
Felix of Nicosia	23 October 2005	St. Peter's Square, Vatican City
Józef Bilczewski	23 October 2005	St. Peter's Square, Vatican City
Gaetano Catanoso	23 October 2005	St. Peter's Square, Vatican City
Zygmunt Gorazdowski	23 October 2005	St. Peter's Square, Vatican City
Alberto Hurtado	23 October 2005	St. Peter's Square, Vatican City
Théodore Guérin	15 October 2006	St. Peter's Square, Vatican City
Rafael Guízar Valencia	15 October 2006	St. Peter's Square, Vatican City
Filippo Smaldone	15 October 2006	St. Peter's Square, Vatican City
Rose Venerini	15 October 2006	St. Peter's Square, Vatican City
Anthony of St. Ann Galvão	11 May 2007	São Paulo, Brazil
Szymon of Lipnica	3 June 2007	St. Peter's Square, Vatican City
Charles of Mount Argus	3 June 2007	St. Peter's Square, Vatican City
Marie-Eugénie de Jésus	3 June 2007	St. Peter's Square, Vatican City
George Preca	3 June 2007	St. Peter's Square, Vatican City
María Bernarda Bütler	12 October 2008	St. Peter's Square, Vatican City
Gaetano Errico	12 October 2008	St. Peter's Square, Vatican City
Alphonsa Muttathupadathu	12 October 2008	St. Peter's Square, Vatican City
Narcisa de Jesús	12 October 2008	St. Peter's Square, Vatican City
Nuno Álvares Pereira	26 April 2009	St. Peter's Square, Vatican City
Geltrude Comensoli	26 April 2009	St. Peter's Square, Vatican City
Arcangelo Tadini	26 April 2009	St. Peter's Square, Vatican City
Bernardo Tolomei	26 April 2009	St. Peter's Square, Vatican City
Caterina Volpicelli	26 April 2009	St. Peter's Square, Vatican City
Rafael Arnáiz Barón	11 October 2009	St. Peter's Square, Vatican City
Francisco Coll Guitart	11 October 2009	St. Peter's Square, Vatican City
Damien De Veuster	11 October 2009	St. Peter's Square, Vatican City
Zygmunt Szczęsny Feliński	11 October 2009	St. Peter's Square, Vatican City
Jeanne Jugan	11 October 2009	St. Peter's Square, Vatican City
André Bessette	17 October 2010	St. Peter's Square, Vatican City
Candida Maria of Jesus	17 October 2010	St. Peter's Square, Vatican City
Mary MacKillop	17 October 2010	St. Peter's Square, Vatican City
Giulia Salzano	17 October 2010	St. Peter's Square, Vatican City
Stanisław Kazimierczyk	17 October 2010	St. Peter's Square, Vatican City
Camilla Battista da Varano	17 October 2010	St. Peter's Square, Vatican City
Guido Maria Conforti	23 October 2011	St. Peter's Square, Vatican City
Luigi Guanella	23 October 2011	St. Peter's Square, Vatican City
Bonifacia Rodríguez y Castro	23 October 2011	St. Peter's Square, Vatican City
Hildegard of Bingen	10 May 2012	Vatican City (equipollent canonization)
Jacques Berthieu	21 October 2012	St. Peter's Square, Vatican City
Pedro Calungsod	21 October 2012	St. Peter's Square, Vatican City
Marianne Cope	21 October 2012	St. Peter's Square, Vatican City
Giovanni Battista Piamarta	21 October 2012	St. Peter's Square, Vatican City
María del Monte Carmelo Sallés y Barangueras	21 October 2012	St. Peter's Square, Vatican City
Anna Schäffer	21 October 2012	St. Peter's Square, Vatican City
Kateri Tekakwitha	21 October 2012	St. Peter's Square, Vatican City

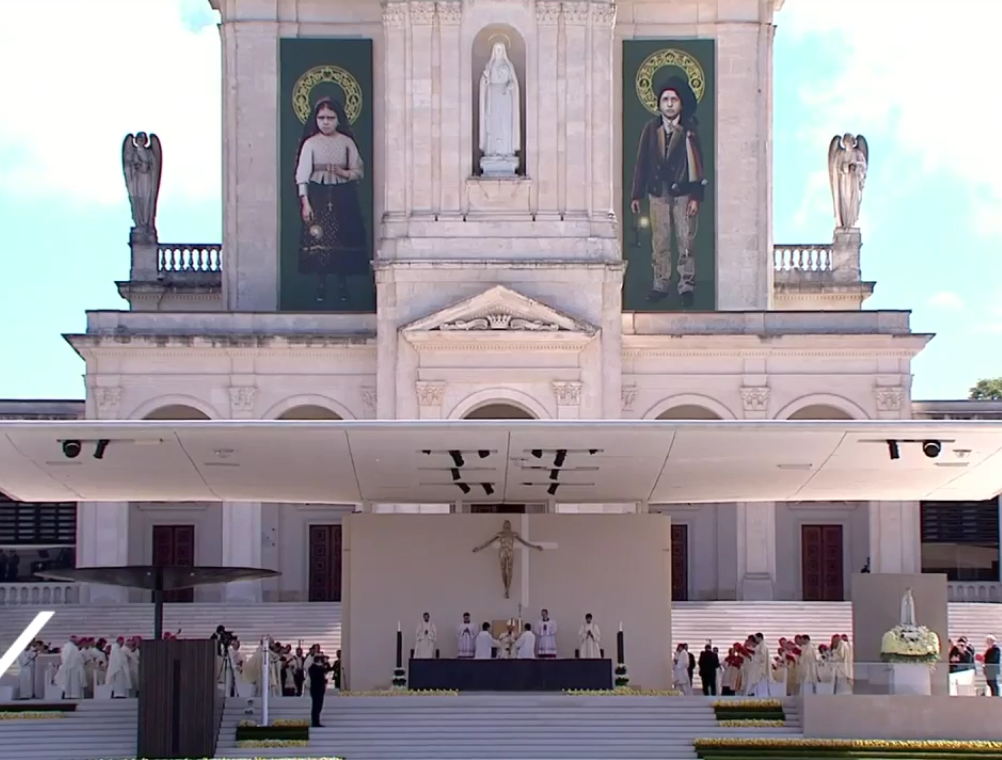
Pope Francis canonizing Francisco and Jacinta Marto on May 13, 2017.

== Canonized by Pope Francis ==
The following are saints canonized by Pope Francis from 2013–2025:

Saint	Date of Canonization	Place of Canonization
Antonio Primaldo & 812 Companions	12 May 2013	Saint Peter's Square, Vatican City
Laura Montoya Upegui	12 May 2013	Saint Peter's Square, Vatican City
Maria Guadalupe Garcia Zavala	12 May 2013	Saint Peter's Square, Vatican City
Angela of Foligno	9 October 2013	Apostolic Palace, Vatican City
Peter Faber	17 December 2013	Apostolic Palace, Vatican City
José de Anchieta	3 April 2014	Apostolic Palace, Vatican City
Marie of the Incarnation	3 April 2014	Apostolic Palace, Vatican City
François de Laval	3 April 2014	Apostolic Palace, Vatican City
Pope John XXIII	27 April 2014	Saint Peter's Square, Vatican City
Pope John Paul II	27 April 2014	Saint Peter's Square, Vatican City
Kuriakose Elias Chavara	23 November 2014	Saint Peter's Square, Vatican City
Nicola Saggio	23 November 2014	Saint Peter's Square, Vatican City
Euphrasia Eluvathingal	23 November 2014	Saint Peter's Square, Vatican City
Giovanni Antonio Farina	23 November 2014	Saint Peter's Square, Vatican City
Ludovico of Casoria	23 November 2014	Saint Peter's Square, Vatican City
Amato Ronconi	23 November 2014	Saint Peter's Square, Vatican City
Joseph Vaz	14 January 2015	Galle Face Green, Colombo, Sri Lanka
Émilie de Villeneuve	17 May 2015	Saint Peter's Square, Vatican City
Maria Cristina of the Immaculate Conception	17 May 2015	Saint Peter's Square, Vatican City
Mariam Baouardy	17 May 2015	Saint Peter's Square, Vatican City
Marie-Alphonsine Danil Ghattas	17 May 2015	Saint Peter's Square, Vatican City
Junípero Serra	23 September 2015	Washington, D.C., United States
Louis Martin	18 October 2015	Saint Peter's Square, Vatican City
Marie-Azélie Guérin Martin	18 October 2015	Saint Peter's Square, Vatican City
Vincenzo Grossi	18 October 2015	Saint Peter's Square, Vatican City
María de la Purísima Salvat Romero	18 October 2015	Saint Peter's Square, Vatican City
Stanisław Papczyński	5 June 2016	Saint Peter's Square, Vatican City
Maria Elizabeth Hesselblad	5 June 2016	Saint Peter's Square, Vatican City
Teresa of Calcutta	4 September 2016	Saint Peter's Square, Vatican City
José Gabriel del Rosario Brochero	16 October 2016	Saint Peter's Square, Vatican City
José Sánchez del Río	16 October 2016	Saint Peter's Square, Vatican City
Manuel González García	16 October 2016	Saint Peter's Square, Vatican City
Elizabeth of the Trinity	16 October 2016	Saint Peter's Square, Vatican City
Alfonso Maria Fusco	16 October 2016	Saint Peter's Square, Vatican City
Lodovico Pavoni	16 October 2016	Saint Peter's Square, Vatican City
Solomon Leclercq	16 October 2016	Saint Peter's Square, Vatican City
Francisco Marto	13 May 2017	Basilica of Our Lady of the Rosary, Fátima, Portugal
Jacinta Marto	13 May 2017	Basilica of Our Lady of the Rosary, Fátima, Portugal
Manuel Míguez González	15 October 2017	Saint Peter's Square, Vatican City
Luca Antonio Falcone	15 October 2017	Saint Peter's Square, Vatican City
André de Soveral & 29 Companions	15 October 2017	Saint Peter's Square, Vatican City
Cristobal & 2 Companions	15 October 2017	Saint Peter's Square, Vatican City
Pope Paul VI	14 October 2018	Saint Peter's Square, Vatican City
Óscar Arnulfo Romero y Galdámez	14 October 2018	Saint Peter's Square, Vatican City
Francesco Spinelli	14 October 2018	Saint Peter's Square, Vatican City
Vincenzo Romano	14 October 2018	Saint Peter's Square, Vatican City
Maria Katharina Kasper	14 October 2018	Saint Peter's Square, Vatican City
Ignacia Nazaria March Mesa	14 October 2018	Saint Peter's Square, Vatican City
Nunzio Sulprizio	14 October 2018	Saint Peter's Square, Vatican City
Bartolomeu Fernandes dos Mártires	5 July 2019	Apostolic Palace, Vatican City
John Henry Newman	13 October 2019	Saint Peter's Square, Vatican City
Giuseppina Vannini	13 October 2019	Saint Peter's Square, Vatican City
Mariam Thresia Chiramel Mankidiyan	13 October 2019	Saint Peter's Square, Vatican City
Dulce Lopes Pontes	13 October 2019	Saint Peter's Square, Vatican City
Marguerite Bays	13 October 2019	Saint Peter's Square, Vatican City
Margherita della Metola	24 April 2021	Apostolic Palace, Vatican City
Titus Brandsma	15 May 2022	Saint Peter's Square, Vatican City
Devasahayam Pillai	15 May 2022	Saint Peter's Square, Vatican City
César de Bus	15 May 2022	Saint Peter's Square, Vatican City
Luigi Maria Palazzolo	15 May 2022	Saint Peter's Square, Vatican City
Giustino Russolillo	15 May 2022	Saint Peter's Square, Vatican City
Charles de Foucauld	15 May 2022	Saint Peter's Square, Vatican City
Anne-Marie Rivier	15 May 2022	Saint Peter's Square, Vatican City
Mary Frances of Jesus Rubatto	15 May 2022	Saint Peter's Square, Vatican City
Carolina Santocanale	15 May 2022	Saint Peter's Square, Vatican City
Maria Domenica Mantovani	15 May 2022	Saint Peter's Square, Vatican City
Giovanni Battista Scalabrini	9 October 2022	Saint Peter's Square, Vatican City
Artémides Zatti	9 October 2022	Saint Peter's Square, Vatican City
María Antonia de Paz y Figueroa	11 February 2024	Saint Peter's Basilica, Vatican City
Manuel Ruiz López & 10 Companions	20 October 2024	Saint Peter's Square, Vatican City
Marie-Léonie Paradis	20 October 2024	Saint Peter's Square, Vatican City
Elena Guerra	20 October 2024	Saint Peter's Square, Vatican City
Giuseppe Allamano	20 October 2024	Saint Peter's Square, Vatican City
Thérèse of Saint Augustine and 15 Companions	18 December 2024	Apostolic Palace, Vatican City

== Canonized by Pope Leo XIV ==
The following are saints canonized by Pope Leo XIV from 2025–present:

Saint	Date of Canonization	Place of Canonization
Carlo Acutis	7 September 2025	Saint Peter's Square, Vatican City
Pier Giorgio Frassati	7 September 2025	Saint Peter's Square, Vatican City
Maria Troncatti	19 October 2025	Saint Peter's Square, Vatican City
Vincenza Maria Poloni	19 October 2025	Saint Peter's Square, Vatican City
Bartolo Longo	19 October 2025	Saint Peter's Square, Vatican City
José Gregorio Hernández	19 October 2025	Saint Peter's Square, Vatican City
Carmen Elena Rendiles Martínez	19 October 2025	Saint Peter's Square, Vatican City
Ignatius Maloyan	19 October 2025	Saint Peter's Square, Vatican City
Peter To Rot	19 October 2025	Saint Peter's Square, Vatican City

== See also ==
- List of saints canonized by Pope John Paul II
- List of saints canonized by Pope Benedict XVI
- List of saints canonized by Pope Francis
- List of saints canonized by Pope Leo XIV
- Chronological list of saints and blesseds in the 21st century
- List of saints canonized in the 20th century
