= List of saints canonized by Pope John Paul II =

This article contains the saints canonized by Pope John Paul II. Pope John Paul II canonized 483 saints, including one equipollent canonizations, during his twenty-six-year reign as Pope from 1978 to 2005:

No.	Saint	Date of Canonization	Place of Canonization
1.	Crispin of Viterbo	20 June 1982	St. Peter's Basilica
2.	Maximilian Kolbe	10 October 1982	St. Peter's Basilica
3.	Marguerite Bourgeoys	31 October 1982	St. Peter's Basilica
4.	Jeanne Delanoue	31 October 1982	St. Peter's Basilica
5.	Leopold Mandić	16 October 1983	St. Peter's Basilica
6.	Paula Frassinetti	11 March 1984	St. Peter's Basilica
7.	Andrew Kim Taegon and 102 Companions	6 May 1984	Seoul, Korea
8.	Miguel Febres Cordero	21 October 1984	St. Peter's Basilica
9.	Francis Anthony Fasani	13 April 1986	St. Peter's Basilica
10.	Joseph Tomasi	12 October 1986	St. Peter's Basilica
11.	Lorenzo Ruiz and 15 companions	18 October 1987	St. Peter's Basilica
12.	Giuseppe Moscati	25 October 1987	St. Peter's Basilica
13.	Roque González de Santa Cruz	16 May 1988	Asunción, Paraguay
14.	Alfonso Rodríguez Olmedo	16 May 1988	Asunción, Paraguay
15.	Juan de Castillo	16 May 1988	Asunción, Paraguay
16.	Eustochia Smeralda Calafato	11 June 1988	Messina, Italy
17.	Andrew Dung-Lac and 116 Companions	19 June 1988	St. Peter's Basilica
18.	Simón de Rojas	3 July 1988	St. Peter's Basilica
19.	Rose Philippine Duchesne	3 July 1988	St. Peter's Basilica
20.	Magdalene of Canossa	2 October 1988	St. Peter's Basilica
21.	Maria Rosa Molas y Vallvé	11 December 1988	St. Peter's Basilica
22.	Clelia Barbieri	9 April 1989	St. Peter's Basilica
23.	Gaspar Bertoni	1 November 1989	St. Peter's Basilica
24.	Richard Pampuri	1 November 1989	St. Peter's Basilica
25.	Agnes of Bohemia	12 November 1989	St. Peter's Basilica
26.	Albert Chmielowski	12 November 1989	St. Peter's Basilica
27.	Mutien-Marie Wiaux	10 December 1989	St. Peter's Basilica
28.	Marie-Marguerite d'Youville	9 December 1990	St. Peter's Basilica
29.	Raphael Kalinowski	17 November 1991	St. Peter's Basilica
30.	Claude de la Colombière	31 May 1992	St. Peter's Basilica
31.	Ezequiel Moreno y Díaz	11 October 1992	Santo Domingo, Dominican Republic
32.	Claudine Thévenet	21 March 1993	St. Peter's Basilica
33.	Teresa of Jesus of Los Andes	21 March 1993	St. Peter's Basilica
34.	Enrique de Ossó y Cercelló	16 June 1993	Madrid, Spain
35.	Meinhard (equipollent)	8 September 1993	Riga, Latvia
36.	Jan Sarkander	21 May 1995	Olomouc, Czech Republic
37.	Zdislava Berka	21 May 1995	Olomouc, Czech Republic
38.	Marko Krizevcanin	2 July 1995	Košice, Slovak Republic
39.	Stephen Pongracz	2 July 1995	Košice, Slovak Republic
40.	Melchior Grodziecki	2 July 1995	Košice, Slovak Republic
41.	Eugene de Mazenod	3 December 1995	St. Peter's Basilica
42.	Jean-Gabriel Perboyre	2 June 1996	St. Peter's Basilica
43.	Egidio Maria of Saint Joseph Francis Anthony Postillo	2 June 1996	St. Peter's Basilica
44.	Juan Grande Román	2 June 1996	St. Peter's Basilica
45.	Jadwiga of Poland	8 June 1997	Kraków, Poland
46.	John of Dukla	10 June 1997	Krosno, Poland
47.	Teresa Benedict of the Cross	11 October 1998	St. Peter's Basilica
48.	Marcellin Joseph Benoît Champagnat	18 April 1999	St. Peter's Basilica
49.	John Calabria	18 April 1999	St. Peter's Basilica
50.	Agostina Livia Pietrantoni	18 April 1999	St. Peter's Basilica
51.	Kinga (equipollent)	16 June 1999	Stary Sącz, Poland
52.	Cirilo Bertrán and 8 Companions	21 November 1999	St. Peter's Basilica
53.	Innocencio of Mary Immaculate	21 November 1999	St. Peter's Basilica
54.	Benedict Menni	21 November 1999	St. Peter's Basilica
55.	Thomas of Cori	21 November 1999	St. Peter's Basilica
56.	Mary Faustina Kowalska	30 April 2000	St. Peter's Basilica
57.	Cristóbal Magallanes Jara and 24 Companions	21 May 2000	St. Peter's Basilica
58.	María Natividad Venegas de la Torre	21 May 2000	St. Peter's Basilica
59.	José Maria de Yermo y Parres	21 May 2000	St. Peter's Basilica
60.	Augustine Chao and 119 companions	1 October 2000	St. Peter's Basilica
61.	Katharine Drexel	1 October 2000	St. Peter's Basilica
62.	Josephine Bakhita	1 October 2000	St. Peter's Basilica
63.	María Josefa Sancho de Guerra	1 October 2000	St. Peter's Basilica
64.	Luigi Scrosoppi	10 June 2001	St. Peter's Basilica
65.	Agostino Roscelli	10 June 2001	St. Peter's Basilica
66.	Bernard of Corleone	10 June 2001	St. Peter's Basilica
67.	Ignazia Verzeri	10 June 2001	St. Peter's Basilica
68.	Rafqa Pietra Choboq Ar-Rayès	10 June 2001	St. Peter's Basilica
69.	Joseph Marello	25 November 2001	St. Peter's Basilica
70.	Paula Montal Fornés	25 November 2001	St. Peter's Basilica
71.	Maria Crescentia Höss	25 November 2001	St. Peter's Basilica
72.	Leonie Aviat	25 November 2001	St. Peter's Basilica
73.	Alonso de Orozco Mena	19 May 2002	St. Peter's Basilica
74.	Ignatius of Santhià	19 May 2002	St. Peter's Basilica
75.	Humilis de Bisignano	19 May 2002	St. Peter's Basilica
76.	Benedetta Cambiagio Frassinello	19 May 2002	St. Peter's Basilica
77.	Paulina of the Agonizing Heart of Jesus	19 May 2002	St. Peter's Basilica
78.	Pio of Pietrelcina	16 June 2002	St. Peter's Basilica
79.	Peter of Saint Joseph Betancur	30 July 2002	Guatemala City, Guatemala
80.	Juan Diego Cuauhtlatoatzin	31 July 2002	Mexico City, Mexico
81.	Josemaría Escrivá	6 October 2002	St. Peter's Basilica
82.	Pedro Poveda Castroverde	4 May 2003	Madrid, Spain
83.	José María Rubio y Peralta	4 May 2003	Madrid, Spain
84.	Angela of the Cross	4 May 2003	Madrid, Spain
85.	María de las Maravillas de Jesús	4 May 2003	Madrid, Spain
86.	Genoveva Torres Morales	4 May 2003	Madrid, Spain
87.	Virginia Centurione Bracelli	18 May 2003	St. Peter's Basilica
88.	Maria De Mattias	18 May 2003	St. Peter's Basilica
89.	Ursula Ledóchowska	18 May 2003	St. Peter's Basilica
90.	Józef Sebastian Pelczar	18 May 2003	St. Peter's Basilica
91.	Daniel Comboni	5 October 2003	St. Peter's Basilica
92.	Joseph Freinademetz	5 October 2003	St. Peter's Basilica
93.	Arnold Janssen	5 October 2003	St. Peter's Basilica
94.	Gianna Beretta Molla	16 May 2004	St. Peter's Basilica
95.	Luigi Orione	16 May 2004	St. Peter's Basilica
96.	Hannibal Mary Di Francia	16 May 2004	St. Peter's Basilica
97.	Joseph Manyanet i Vives	16 May 2004	St. Peter's Basilica
98.	Nimatullah Kassab Al-Hardini	16 May 2004	St. Peter's Basilica
99.	Paola Elisabetta Cerioli	16 May 2004	St. Peter's Basilica

== See also ==
- List of saints canonized by Pope Leo XIII
- List of saints canonized by Pope Pius XI
- List of saints canonized by Pope Pius XII
- List of saints canonized by Pope John XXIII
- List of saints canonized by Pope Paul VI
- List of saints canonized by Pope Benedict XVI
- List of saints canonized by Pope Francis
- List of saints canonized in the 21st century
