= List of saints canonized by Pope Francis =

This article contains a list of the 942 saints canonized by Pope Francis (2013–2025) during his pontificate, which includes the 813 Martyrs of Otranto as a group, 23 who were equipollently canonized and 4 who were canonized in other countries.

== 2013–2016 ==
Saint				Date of Canonization	Place of Canonization	Ref.
No.	Details	Church status	Competent Forum	Date of Canonization	Place of Canonization	Ref.
May 2013
1.	Antonio Primaldo & 812 Companions (+1480)	laypersons of the archdiocese of Otranto	Otranto	12 May 2013	Saint Peter's Square	
2.	Laura Montoya Upegui (1874–1949)	founder, Missionary Sisters of the Immaculate Virgin Mary and Saint Catherine of Siena	Medellín	12 May 2013	Saint Peter's Square	
3.	Maria Guadalupe Garcia Zavala (1878–1963)	cofounder, Handmaids of Saint Margaret Mary and of the Poor	Guadalajara	12 May 2013	Saint Peter's Square	
October 2013
4.	Angela of Foligno (1248–1309)	layperson of the diocese of Foligno; married; member, Secular Franciscans	Urbis et Orbis	9 October 2013	Apostolic Palace, Vatican City	
December 2013
5.	Peter Faber (1506–1546)	professed priest, Jesuits	Urbis et Orbis	17 December 2013	Apostolic Palace, Vatican City	
April 2014
6.	José de Anchieta (1534–1597)	professed priest, Jesuits	São Salvador da Bahia	3 April 2014	Apostolic Palace, Vatican City	
7.	Marie of the Incarnation (1599–1672)	widow; professed religious, Ursulines	Québec	3 April 2014	Apostolic Palace, Vatican City	
8.	François de Laval (1623–1708)	bishop of Québec	Québec	3 April 2014	Apostolic Palace, Vatican City	
9.	Pope John XXIII (1881–1963)	Pope	Rome	27 April 2014	Saint Peter's Square	
10.	Pope John Paul II (1920–2005)	Pope	Rome	27 April 2014	Saint Peter's Square	
November 2014
11.	Kuriakose Elias Chavara (1805–1871)	professed priest and cofounder, Carmelites of Mary Immaculate; founder, Congregation of the Mother of Carmel	Changanacherry/Verapoly	23 November 2014	Saint Peter's Square	
12.	Nicola Saggio (1650–1709)	professed oblate, Minims	Cosenza-Bisignano	23 November 2014	Saint Peter's Square	
13.	Euphrasia Eluvathingal (1877–1952)	professed religious, Congregation of the Mother of Carmel	Trichur	23 November 2014	Saint Peter's Square	
14.	Giovanni Antonio Farina (1803–1888)	founder, Teaching Sisters of Saint Dorothy, Daughters of the Sacred Heart	Vicenza	23 November 2014	Saint Peter's Square	
15.	Ludovico of Casoria (1814–1885)	professed priest, Franciscan Friars Minor; founder, Franciscan Sisters of Saint Elizabeth (Gray Sisters)	Naples	23 November 2014	Saint Peter's Square	
16.	Amato Ronconi (ca. 1226–1292)	layperson of the diocese of Rimini	Rimini	23 November 2014	Saint Peter's Square	
January 2015
17.	Joseph Vaz (1651–1711)	priest, Oratorians (Goa Congregation)	Kandy/Goa-Daman	14 January 2015	Colombo, Sri Lanka	
May 2015
18.	Émilie de Villeneuve (1811–1854)	founder, Sisters of the Immaculate Conception of Castres	Albi	17 May 2015	Saint Peter's Square	
19.	Maria Cristina of the Immaculate Conception (1856–1906)	founder, Oblation Sisters of the Blessed Sacrament	Naples	17 May 2015	Saint Peter's Square	
20.	Mariam Baouardy (1846–1878)	professed religious, Discalced Carmelite Nuns	Jerusalem of the Latins	17 May 2015	Saint Peter's Square	
21.	Marie-Alphonsine Danil Ghattas (1843–1927)	cofounder, Sisters of the Holy Rosary of Jerusalem of the Latins (Rosary Sisters)	Jerusalem of the Latins	17 May 2015	Saint Peter's Square	
September 2015
22.	Junípero Serra (1713–1784)	professed priest, Franciscan Friars Minor (Observants)	Monterey	23 September 2015	Washington, D.C., United States	
October 2015
23.	Louis Martin (1823–1894)	layperson of the diocese of Bayeux-Liseux; married	Bayeux-Liseux	18 October 2015	Saint Peter's Square	
24.	Marie-Azélie Guérin Martin (1831–1877)	layperson of the diocese of Séez; married	Séez	18 October 2015	Saint Peter's Square	
25.	Vincenzo Grossi (1845–1917)	priest of the diocese of Lodi; founder, Daughters of the Oratory	Lodi	18 October 2015	Saint Peter's Square	
26.	María de la Purísima Salvat Romero (1926–1998)	professed religious, Sisters of the Company of the Cross	Seville	18 October 2015	Saint Peter's Square	
June 2016
27.	Stanisław Papczyński (1631–1701)	professed priest and founder, Marians of the Immaculate Conception	Poznań	5 June 2016	Saint Peter's Square	
28.	Maria Elizabeth Hesselblad (1870–1957)	founder, Bridgettine Sisters	Rome	5 June 2016	Saint Peter's Square	
September 2016
29.	Teresa of Calcutta (1910–1997)	founder, Missionaries of Charity	Calcutta	4 September 2016	Saint Peter's Square	
October 2016
30.	José Gabriel del Rosario Brochero (1840–1914)	priest of the Archdiocese of Córdoba	Córdoba	16 October 2016	Saint Peter's Square	
31.	José Sánchez del Río (1913–1928)	child of the diocese of Zamora	Zamora	16 October 2016	Saint Peter's Square	
32.	Manuel González García (1877–1940)	bishop of Palencia; founder, Eucharistic Missionaries of Nazareth and Eucharistic Reparation Union	Palencia	16 October 2016	Saint Peter's Square	
33.	Elizabeth of the Trinity (1880–1906)	professed religious, Discalced Carmelite Nuns	Dijon	16 October 2016	Saint Peter's Square	
34.	Alfonso Maria Fusco (1839–1910)	priest of the diocese of Nocera Inferiore-Sarno; founder, Sisters of Saint John the Baptist	Nocera Inferiore-Sarno	16 October 2016	Saint Peter's Square	
35.	Lodovico Pavoni (1784–1849)	priest and founder, Sons of Mary Immaculate	Brescia	16 October 2016	Saint Peter's Square	
36.	Solomon Leclercq (1745–1792)	professed religious, Brothers of the Christian Schools (De La Salle Brothers)	Caracas	16 October 2016	Saint Peter's Square	

== 2017–2019 ==
Saint				Date of Canonization	Place of Canonization	Ref.
No.	Details	Church status	Competent Forum	Date of Canonization	Place of Canonization	Ref.
May 2017
1.	Francisco Marto (1908–1919)	children of the diocese of Leiria-Fátima	Leiria-Fátima	13 May 2017	Fatima, Portugal	
2.	Jacinta Marto (1910–1920)	children of the diocese of Leiria-Fátima	Leiria-Fátima	13 May 2017	Fatima, Portugal	
October 2017
3.	Manuel Míguez González (1831–1925)	professed priest, Piarists; founder, Calasanzian Institute, Daughters of the Divine Shepherdess	Madrid	15 October 2017	Saint Peter's Square	
4.	Luca Antonio Falcone (1669–1739)	professed priest, Capuchin Franciscans	Cosenza-Bisignano	15 October 2017	Saint Peter's Square	
5.	André de Soveral & 29 Companions (+1645)	priest and laypersons of the archdiocese of Natal	Natal	15 October 2017	Saint Peter's Square	
6.	Cristobal & 2 Companions (+1527–1529)	children of the diocese of Tlaxcala	Tlaxcala	15 October 2017	Saint Peter's Square	
October 2018
7.	Pope Paul VI (1897–1978)	Pope	Rome/Brescia	14 October 2018	Saint Peter's Square	
8.	Óscar Arnulfo Romero y Galdámez (1917–1980)	archbishop of San Salvador	San Salvador	14 October 2018	Saint Peter's Square	
9.	Francesco Spinelli (1853–1913)	priest of the diocese of Cremona; founder, Sisters Adorers of the Blessed Sacrament	Cremona	14 October 2018	Saint Peter's Square	
10.	Vincenzo Romano (1751–1831)	priest of the archdiocese of Naples	Naples	14 October 2018	Saint Peter's Square	
11.	Maria Katharina Kasper (1820–1898)	founder, Poor Handmaids of Jesus Christ	Limburg	14 October 2018	Saint Peter's Square	
12.	Ignacia Nazaria March Mesa (1889–1943)	founder, Missionary Crusaders of the Church	Buenos Aires	14 October 2018	Saint Peter's Square	
13.	Nunzio Sulprizio (1817–1836)	young layperson of the archdiocese of Naples	Naples/Pescara-Penne	14 October 2018	Saint Peter's Square	
July 2019
14.	Bartolomeu Fernandes dos Mártires (1514–1590)	professed priest, Dominicans; archbishop of Braga	Urbis et Orbis	5 July 2019	Apostolic Palace, Vatican City	
October 2019
15.	John Henry Newman (1801–1890)	priest, Oratorians (Birmingham Congregation); cardinal	Birmingham	13 October 2019	Saint Peter's Square	
16.	Giuseppina Vannini (1859–1911)	founder, Daughters of Saint Camillus	Rome	13 October 2019	Saint Peter's Square	
17.	Mariam Thresia Chiramel Mankidiyan (1876–1926)	founder, Congregation of the Holy Family	Irinjalakuda	13 October 2019	Saint Peter's Square	
18.	Dulce Lopes Pontes (1914–1992)	professed religious, Missionary Sisters of the Immaculate Conception	São Salvador da Bahia	13 October 2019	Saint Peter's Square	
19.	Marguerite Bays (1815–1879)	layperson of the archdiocese of Lausanne; member, Secular Franciscans	Lausanne-Geneva-Fribourg	13 October 2019	Saint Peter's Square	

== 2021–2024 ==
Saint				Date of Canonization	Place of Canonization	Ref.
No.	Details	Church status	Competent Forum	Date of Canonization	Place of Canonization	Ref.
April 2021
1.	Margherita della Metola (ca. 1287–1320)	layperson of the diocese of Città di Castello; member, Lay Dominicans	Urbis et Orbis	24 April 2021	Apostolic Palace, Vatican City	
May 2022
2.	Titus Brandsma (1881–1942)	professed priest, Carmelites of the Ancient Observance	's-Hertogenbosch	15 May 2022	Saint Peter's Square	
3.	Devasahayam Pillai (1712–1752)	layperson of the diocese of Kottar; married	Kottar	15 May 2022	Saint Peter's Square	
4.	César de Bus (1544–1607)	priest and founder, Christian Doctrine Fathers	Avignon	15 May 2022	Saint Peter's Square	
5.	Luigi Maria Palazzolo (1827–1886)	priest of the diocese of Bergamo; founder, Sisters of the Poor, Palazzolo Institute	Bergamo	15 May 2022	Saint Peter's Square	
6.	Giustino Russolillo (1891–1955)	priest and founder, Society of Divine Vocations (Vocationists) and Sisters of Divine Vocations	Pozzuoli/Naples	15 May 2022	Saint Peter's Square	
7.	Charles de Foucauld (1858–1916)	priest of the diocese of Viviers	Laghouat	15 May 2022	Saint Peter's Square	
8.	Anne-Marie Rivier (1768–1838)	founder, Sisters of the Presentation of Mary	Viviers	15 May 2022	Saint Peter's Square	
9.	Maria Francesca Rubatto (1844–1904)	founder, Capuchin Sisters of Mother Rubatto	Montevideo/Genoa	15 May 2022	Saint Peter's Square	
10.	Carolina Santocanale (1852–1923)	founder, Capuchin Sisters of the Immaculata of Lourdes	Monreale	15 May 2022	Saint Peter's Square	
11.	Maria Domenica Mantovani (1862–1934)	cofounder, Little Sisters of the Holy Family	Verona	15 May 2022	Saint Peter's Square	
October 2022
12.	Giovanni Battista Scalabrini (1839–1905)	bishop of Piacenza; founder, Missionaries of Saint Charles (Scalabrinians) and Missionary Sisters of Saint Charles Borromeo (Scalabrinian Sisters)	Piacenza	9 October 2022	Saint Peter's Square	
13.	Artémides Zatti (1880–1951)	professed religious, Salesians of Don Bosco	Viedma	9 October 2022	Saint Peter's Square	
February 2024
14.	María Antonia de Paz y Figueroa (1730–1799)	layperson of the archdiocese of Buenos Aires; founder, Beaterio of the Spiritual Exercise of Buenos Aires (now Daughters of the Divine Savior)	Buenos Aires	11 February 2024	Saint Peter's Basilica	
October 2024
15.	Manuel Ruiz López & 10 Companions (+1860)	priests, religious, laypersons and martyrs	Damascus of the Latins/Damascus of the Maronites	20 October 2024	Saint Peter's Square	
16.	Giuseppe Allamano (1851–1926)	priest and founder, Consolata Missionaries	Turin	20 October 2024	Saint Peter's Square	
17.	Marie-Léonie Paradis (1840–1912)	founder, Little Sisters of the Holy Family	Sherbrooke	20 October 2024	Saint Peter's Square	
18.	Elena Guerra (1835–1914)	founder, Oblates of the Holy Spirit	Lucca	20 October 2024	Saint Peter's Square	
November 2024
19.	Thérèse of Saint Augustine & 15 Companions (+1794)	professed religious, Discalced Carmelite Nuns	Paris/Beauvais	18 December 2024	Apostolic Palace, Vatican City	

== See also ==
- List of canonizations
- List of saints canonized by Pope Leo XIII
- List of saints canonized by Pope Pius XI
- List of saints canonized by Pope Pius XII
- List of saints canonized by Pope John XXIII
- List of saints canonized by Pope Paul VI
- List of saints canonized by Pope John Paul II
- List of saints canonized by Pope Benedict XVI
- List of saints canonized by Pope Leo XIV
- List of saints canonized in the 21st century
