= List of saints canonized by Pope Leo XIII =

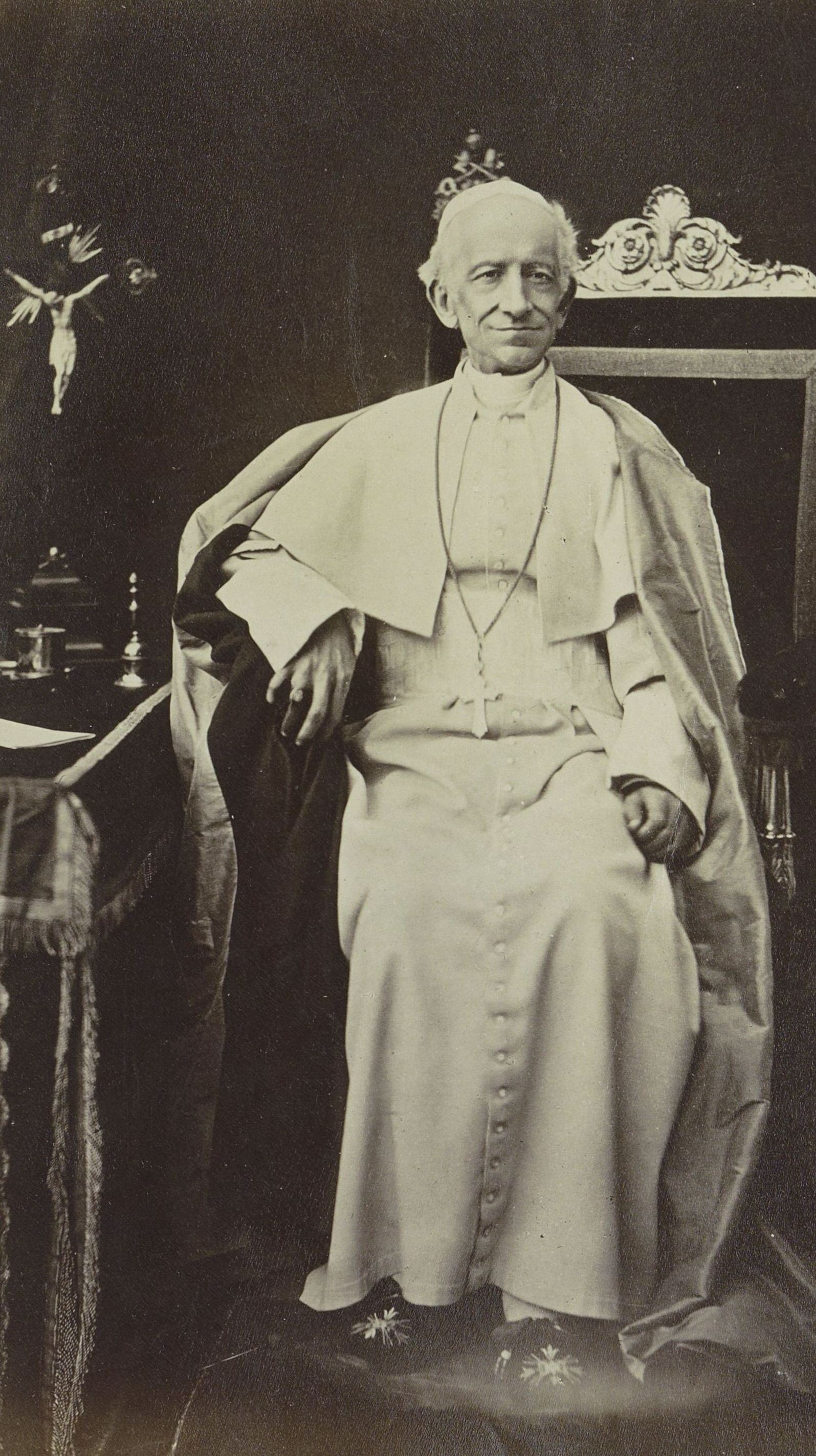
Pope Leo XIII

This article is a list of saints canonized by Pope Leo XIII.

No.	Saint	Date of Canonization	Place of Canonization
1.	Benedict Joseph Labre	8 December 1881	Saint Peter's Basilica, Kingdom of Italy
2.	Clare of Montefalco	8 December 1881	Saint Peter's Basilica, Kingdom of Italy
3.	Giovanni Battista de Rossi	8 December 1881	Saint Peter's Basilica, Kingdom of Italy
4.	Lawrence of Brindisi	8 December 1881	Saint Peter's Basilica, Kingdom of Italy
5.	Alphonsus Rodriguez	15 January 1888	Rome, Kingdom of Italy
6.	John Berchmans	15 January 1888	Rome, Kingdom of Italy
7.	Peter Claver	15 January 1888	Rome, Kingdom of Italy
8.	Seven Holy Founders of the Servite Order	15 January 1888	Rome, Kingdom of Italy
9.	Antonio Maria Zaccaria	27 May 1897	Rome, Kingdom of Italy
10.	Peter Fourier	27 May 1897	Rome, Kingdom of Italy
11.	Jean-Baptiste de La Salle	24 May 1900	Rome, Kingdom of Italy
12.	Rita of Cascia	24 May 1900	Rome, Kingdom of Italy

== See also ==
- List of saints canonized by Pope Pius XI
- List of saints canonized by Pope Pius XII
- List of saints canonized by Pope John XXIII
- List of saints canonized by Pope Paul VI
- List of saints canonized by Pope John Paul II
- List of saints canonized by Pope Benedict XVI
- List of saints canonized by Pope Francis
- List of saints canonized by Pope Leo XIV
