= List of saints canonized by Pope Benedict XVI =

This article contains the saints canonized by Pope Benedict XVI. Pope Benedict XVI canonized 45 saints, including one equipollent canonization, during his seven-year reign as Pope from 2005 to 2013:

No.	Saint	Date of Canonisation	Place of Canonisation	Reference
1.	Felix of Nicosia	23 October 2005	St. Peter's Square	
2.	Józef Bilczewski	23 October 2005	St. Peter's Square	
3.	Gaetano Catanoso	23 October 2005	St. Peter's Square	
4.	Zygmunt Gorazdowski	23 October 2005	St. Peter's Square	
5.	Alberto Hurtado	23 October 2005	St. Peter's Square	
6.	Théodore Guérin	15 October 2006	St. Peter's Square	
7.	Rafael Guízar Valencia	15 October 2006	St. Peter's Square	
8.	Filippo Smaldone	15 October 2006	St. Peter's Square	
9.	Rose Venerini	15 October 2006	St. Peter's Square	
10.	Anthony of St. Ann Galvão	11 May 2007	São Paulo, Brazil	
11.	Szymon of Lipnica	3 June 2007	St. Peter's Square	
12.	Charles of Mount Argus	3 June 2007	St. Peter's Square	
13.	Marie-Eugénie de Jésus	3 June 2007	St. Peter's Square	
14.	George Preca	3 June 2007	St. Peter's Square	
15.	María Bernarda Bütler	12 October 2008	St. Peter's Square	
16.	Gaetano Errico	12 October 2008	St. Peter's Square	
17.	Alphonsa Muttathupadathu	12 October 2008	St. Peter's Square	
18.	Narcisa de Jesús	12 October 2008	St. Peter's Square	
19.	Nuno Álvares Pereira	26 April 2009	St. Peter's Square	
20.	Geltrude Comensoli	26 April 2009	St. Peter's Square	
21.	Arcangelo Tadini	26 April 2009	St. Peter's Square	
22.	Bernardo Tolomei	26 April 2009	St. Peter's Square	
23.	Caterina Volpicelli	26 April 2009	St. Peter's Square	
24.	Rafael Arnáiz Barón	11 October 2009	St. Peter's Basilica	
25.	Francisco Coll Guitart	11 October 2009	St. Peter's Basilica	
26.	Damien De Veuster	11 October 2009	St. Peter's Basilica	
27.	Zygmunt Szczęsny Feliński	11 October 2009	St. Peter's Basilica	
28.	Jeanne Jugan	11 October 2009	St. Peter's Basilica	
29.	André Bessette	17 October 2010	St. Peter's Square	
30.	Candida Maria of Jesus	17 October 2010	St. Peter's Square	
31.	Mary MacKillop	17 October 2010	St. Peter's Square	
32.	Giulia Salzano	17 October 2010	St. Peter's Square	
33.	Stanisław Kazimierczyk	17 October 2010	St. Peter's Square	
34.	Camilla Battista da Varano	17 October 2010	St. Peter's Square	
35.	Guido Maria Conforti	23 October 2011	St. Peter's Square	
36.	Luigi Guanella	23 October 2011	St. Peter's Square	
37.	Bonifacia Rodríguez y Castro	23 October 2011	St. Peter's Square	
38.	Hildegard of Bingen	10 May 2012	Vatican City (equipollent)	
39.	Jacques Berthieu	21 October 2012	St. Peter's Square	
40.	Pedro Calungsod	21 October 2012	St. Peter's Square	
41.	Marianne Cope	21 October 2012	St. Peter's Square	
42.	Giovanni Battista Piamarta	21 October 2012	St. Peter's Square	
43.	María del Monte Carmelo Sallés y Barangueras	21 October 2012	St. Peter's Square	
44.	Anna Schäffer	21 October 2012	St. Peter's Square	
45.	Kateri Tekakwitha	21 October 2012	St. Peter's Square	

== See also ==
- List of saints canonized by Pope Leo XIII
- List of saints canonized by Pope Pius XI
- List of saints canonized by Pope Pius XII
- List of saints canonized by Pope John XXIII
- List of saints canonized by Pope Paul VI
- List of saints canonized by Pope John Paul II
- List of saints canonized by Pope Francis
- List of saints canonized in the 21st century
