= Chronological list of saints and blesseds in the 21st century =

This is a list of saints and blesseds in the 21st century.

== Saints ==
Name	Birth	Birthplace	Death	Place of death	Beatification date	Canonization date	Notes
Pope John XXIII	1881	Sotto il Monte, Italy	1963	Vatican City	September 3, 2000	April 27, 2014	Pope
Pope John Paul II	1920	Wadowice, Poland	2005	Vatican City	May 1, 2011	April 27, 2014	Pope
Carlo Acutis	1991	London, United Kingdom	2006	Monza, Italy	October 10, 2020	September 7, 2025	Layman
21 Coptic Martyrs of Libya	Various	One from Ghana, others from Egypt	2015	Sirte, Libya	N/A	N/A (Canonized by the Coptic Orthodox Church)	Laymen and martyrs. Not traditionally canonized, but added to the Roman Martyrology.

== Blesseds ==
Name	Birth	Birthplace	Death	Place of death	Beatification date	Notes
Leonella Sgorbati	1940	Piacenza, Italy	2006	Mogadishu, Somalia	May 26, 2018	Religious sister of the Consolata Missionaries and martyr and martyr
Floribert Bwana Chui	1981	Goma, Democratic Republic of the Congo	2007	Goma, Democratic Republic of the Congo	June 15, 2025	Martyr

== See also ==
- Christianity in the 21st century
- List of saints canonized in the 21st century
