= List of saints canonized by Pope Pius XI =

This article is a list of saints canonized by Pope Pius XI.

No.	Saint	Date of Canonization	Place of Canonization	Reference
1.	Thérèse of Lisieux	17 May 1925	Saint Peter's Basilica, Vatican City	
2.	Peter Canisius	21 May 1925	Rome, Italy	
3.	Madeleine Sophie Barat	24 May 1925	Rome, Italy	
4.	Marie-Madeleine Postel	24 May 1925	Rome, Italy	
5.	Bogumił z Dobrowa	27 May 1925	Vatican City (equipollent)	
6.	John Vianney	31 May 1925	Rome, Italy	
7.	Jean Eudes	31 May 1925	Rome, Italy	
8.	Catherine of Palma	22 June 1930	Rome, Italy	
9.	Lucy Filippini	22 June 1930	Rome, Italy	
10.	Canadian Martyrs	29 June 1930	Saint Peter's Basilica, Vatican City	
11.	Robert Bellarmine	29 June 1930	Saint Peter's Basilica, Vatican City	
12.	Theophilus of Corte	29 June 1930	Saint Peter's Basilica, Vatican City	
13.	Albertus Magnus	16 December 1931	Vatican City	
14.	Andrew Fournet	4 June 1933	Saint Peter's Basilica, Vatican City	
15.	Bernadette Soubirous	8 December 1933	Rome, Italy	
16.	Joan Antidea Thouret	14 January 1934	Saint Peter's Basilica, Vatican City	
17.	Maria Micaela Desmaisieres	4 March 1934	Saint Peter's Basilica, Vatican City	
18.	Louise de Marillac	11 March 1934	Saint Peter's Basilica, Vatican City	
19.	Giuseppe Benedetto Cottolengo	19 March 1934	Saint Peter's Basilica, Vatican City	
20.	Pompilio Maria Pirrotti	19 March 1934	Saint Peter's Basilica, Vatican City	
21.	Teresa Margaret of the Sacred Heart	19 March 1934	Saint Peter's Basilica, Vatican City	
22.	John Bosco	1 April 1934	Rome, Italy	
23.	Conrad of Parzham	20 May 1934	Rome, Italy	
24.	John Fisher	19 May 1935	Vatican City	
25.	Thomas More	19 May 1935	Vatican City	
26.	Hemma of Gurk	5 January 1938	Rome (equipollent)	
27.	Andrew Bobola	17 April 1938	Saint Peter's Basilica, Vatican City	
28.	Giovanni Leonardi	17 April 1938	Saint Peter's Basilica, Vatican City	
29.	Salvador of Horta	17 April 1938	Saint Peter's Basilica, Vatican City	

== See also ==
- List of saints canonized by Pope Leo XIII
- List of saints canonized by Pope Pius XII
- List of saints canonized by Pope John XXIII
- List of saints canonized by Pope Paul VI
- List of saints canonized by Pope John Paul II
- List of saints canonized by Pope Benedict XVI
- List of saints canonized by Pope Francis
