= Felix of Nicosia =

Italian Roman Catholic saint

Saint Felix of Nicosia O.F.M. Cap.
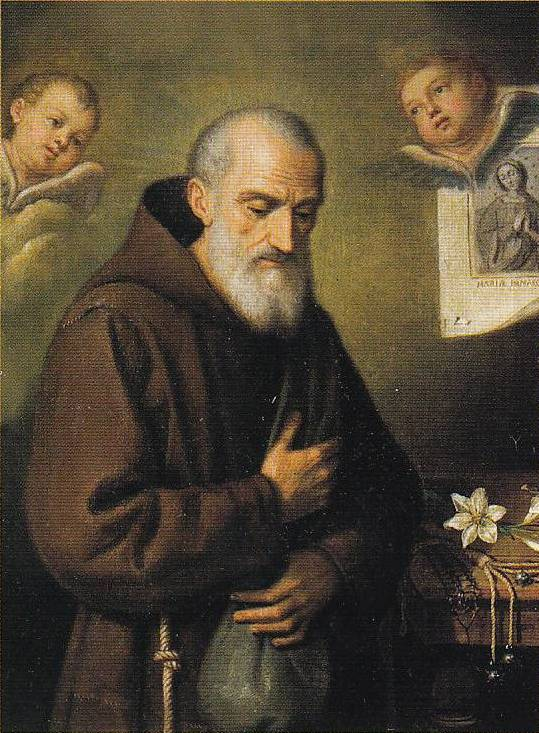
- Born: 5 November 1715; Nicosia, Sicily
- Died: 31 May 1787; Nicosia, Sicily
- Venerated in: Roman Catholic Church
- Beatified: 12 February 1888 by Pope Leo XIII
- Canonized: 23 October 2005 by Pope Benedict XVI
- Major shrine: Cathedral of St. Nicholas; Nicosia, Sicily
- Feast: June 2

Felix of Nicosia (Italian: Felice di Nicosia; November 5, 1715 – May 31, 1787) was a Capuchin friar, and is honored as a saint in the Roman Catholic Church.

== Life ==
He was born Filippo Giacomo Amoroso in Nicosia, Sicily on 5 November 1715, about three weeks after the death of his father on October 12. As a young boy Filippo helped in the workshop of a shoemaker near a Capuchin friary. Thus from an early age, he got to know the friars and their way of life.

At the age of 20 he asked the Guardian of the friary to speak for him to the Minister Provincial in Messina so that he could be admitted to the Order as a lay brother. Being illiterate, he could not be admitted as a cleric. His application was rejected several times; however, seeing his continued perseverance, after eight years he was admitted to the Order and sent to the novitiate in Mistretta.

On October 19, 1743 he entered the novitiate, being given the name of Brother Felix (after the first Capuchin saint), and professed his vows a year later.

Against the norms, the authorities of the Province then assigned him to the friary in his hometown. This was contrary to the norms, because the fear was that young friars would find themselves distracted by family and friends, thereby stunting their spiritual growth. Yet the level of his detachment was so great that they felt that this fear was largely unwarranted in his case.

He was given the job of quaestor, which involved roaming the region in the goal of collecting alms to support the friars and their work. Every day he would knock on doors, inviting people to share their prosperity. His nature was such that he would always say 'thank you' and even when he was manhandled he would exclaim: Let it be for the love of God.

He was devoted to Jesus Christ and the Virgin Mary. On Fridays he would contemplate the Passion and death of Jesus Christ. On Fridays during Lent, he fasted on bread and water. He had a particular veneration for the Blessed Sacrament, spending hours in front of the tabernacle, even after having endured the harsh trials of every day.

He was endowed with the gift of healing both physical and spiritual diseases and he delighted in tending the sick. It was said he could bilocate. Called to aid the sick when a malignant epidemic was decimating the nearby town of Cerami in March 1777, he responded eagerly. He went about ministering the sick, and his efforts were crowned with great success.

For 33 years he lived under a guardian who considered it his role to sanctify Felix by subjecting him to relentless severity and fantastic humiliations, all of which he heroically endured. Finally, in May 1787 he was overtaken by a sudden, raging fever while working in the garden. Felix told the doctor, who prescribed medicines for him that proved useless, because this was his final illness. He died later that month, on May 31, at two in the morning. So dedicated was he to his vow of obedience that he requested permission to die from the guardian of the community.

== Veneration ==
Felix was beatified by Pope Leo XIII on 2 February 1888. In 1891, his relics were translated to the cathedral of the city for greater access by the public who wished to venerate him. The cause for his canonization was opened on 19 June 1902, and he was canonized on 23 October 2005 by Pope Benedict XVI.

== See also ==
- List of saints canonized by Pope Benedict XVI
