= List of saints canonized by Pope Paul VI =

This article is a list of saints canonized by Pope Paul VI. Pope Paul VI canonized 84 saints during his pontificate from 1963 to 1978:

No.	Saint	Date of Canonization	Place of Canonization	Reference
1.	Charles Lwanga and 21 Companions	18 October 1964	St. Peter's Basilica	
2.	Adelaide of Vilich	27 January 1966	Rome (equipollent)	
3.	Benildus Romançon	29 October 1967	St. Peter's Basilica	
4.	Julie Billiart	22 June 1969	St. Peter's Basilica	
5.	Berthold of Garsten	8 January 1970	Apostolic Palace, Vatican City (equipollent)	
6.	Maria Soledad	25 January 1970	St. Peter's Basilica	
7.	Leonardo Murialdo	3 May 1970	St. Peter's Basilica	
8.	Thérèse Couderc	10 May 1970	St. Peter's Basilica	
9.	John of Ávila	31 May 1970	St. Peter's Basilica	
10.	Nikola Tavelić and 3 companions	21 June 1970	St. Peter's Basilica	
11.	Cuthbert Mayne and 39 companions	25 October 1970	St. Peter's Basilica	
12.	Teresa of Jesus	27 January 1974	St. Peter's Basilica	
13.	John Baptist of the Conception	25 May 1975	St. Peter's Basilica	
14.	Vincentia Maria López y Vicuña	25 May 1975	St. Peter's Basilica	
15.	Elizabeth Ann Seton	14 September 1975	St. Peter's Basilica	
16.	John Macias	28 September 1975	St. Peter's Basilica	
17.	Oliver Plunkett	12 October 1975	St. Peter's Basilica	
18.	Justin de Jacobis	26 October 1975	St. Peter's Basilica	
19.	Dorothea of Montau	9 January 1976	Apostolic Palace, Vatican City	
20.	Beatrice of Silva	3 October 1976	St. Peter's Basilica	
21.	John Ogilvie	17 October 1976	St. Peter's Basilica	
22.	Rafaela Porras Ayllón	23 January 1977	St. Peter's Basilica	
23.	John Neumann	19 June 1977	St. Peter's Basilica	
24.	Charbel Makhluf	9 October 1977	St. Peter's Basilica	

== See also ==
- Equivalent canonization
- List of saints canonized by Pope Leo XIII
- List of saints canonized by Pope Pius XI
- List of saints canonized by Pope Pius XII
- List of saints canonized by Pope John Paul II
- List of saints canonized by Pope Benedict XVI
- List of saints canonized by Pope Francis
