= Genoveva Torres Morales =

Spanish Roman Catholic nun

Saint Genoveva Torres Morales
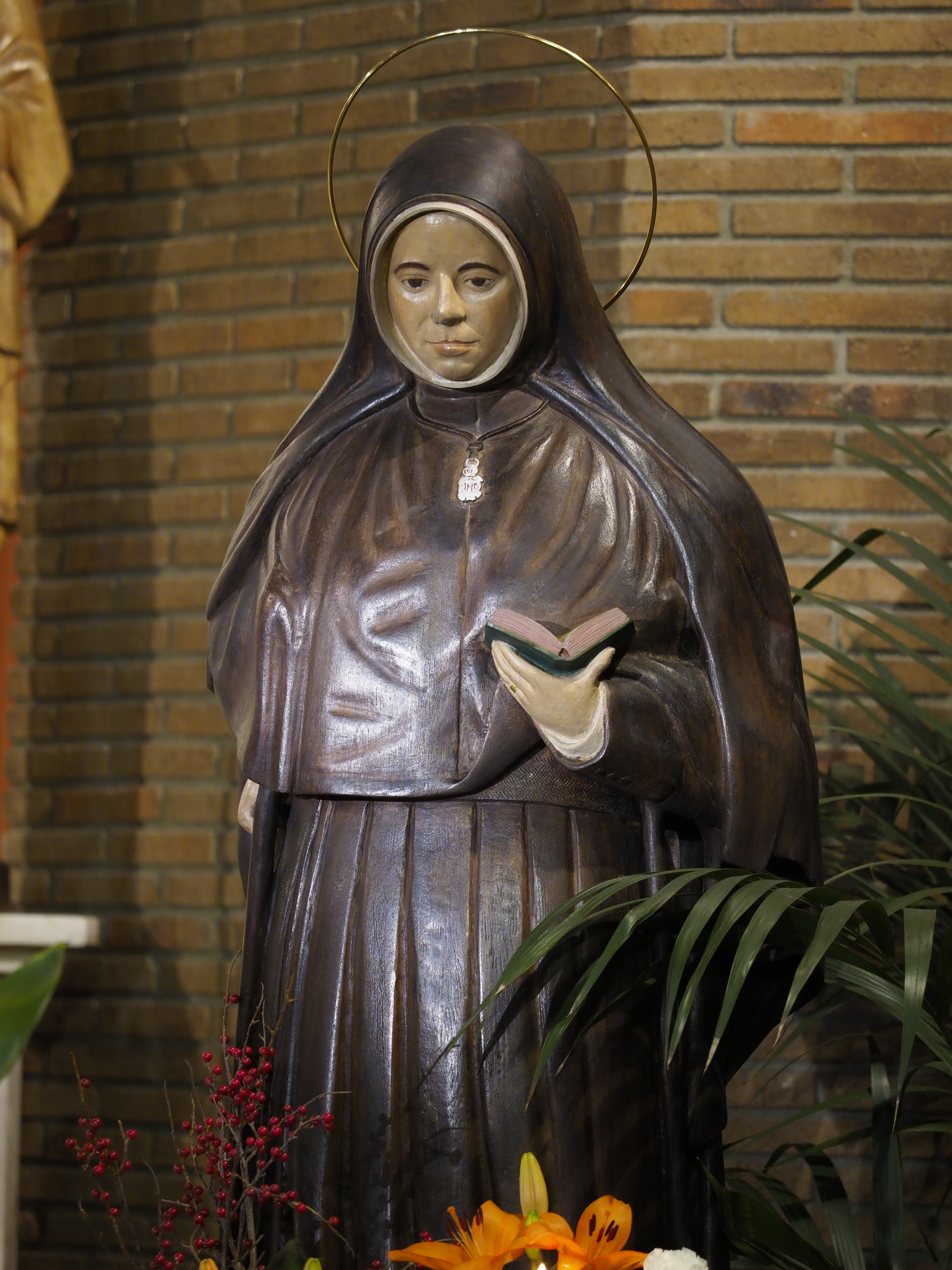

Religious
- Born: 3 January 1870; Almenara, Castellón, Spain
- Died: 5 January 1956 (aged 86); Zaragoza, Spain
- Venerated in: Roman Catholic Church
- Beatified: 29 January 1995, Saint Peter's Square, Vatican City by Pope John Paul II
- Canonized: 4 May 2003, Madrid, Spain by Pope John Paul II
- Feast: 5 January
- Attributes: Religious habit; Scapular
- Patronage: Daughters of the Sacred Heart of Jesus and of the Holy Angels

Genoveva Torres Morales (3 January 1870 – 5 January 1956) was a Spanish Roman Catholic nun who established her own congregation known as the Daughters of the Sacred Heart of Jesus and of the Holy Angels. She wanted her new congregation to focus on the care of women. During her life and after her death, she was referred to as an "Angel of Solitude".

Pope John Paul II beatified her in 1995 and canonized her in 2003 in Spain.

== Life ==
Genoveva Torres Morales was born in Almenara in 1870 as the last of six children to poor parents whom she lost before she was eight years old. Four of her six brothers also died at this point. She remained in the care of her eldest brother José who was 18. Despite this hard life she remained steadfast in her faith which never wavered. Of course this also impacted on her completion of her education due to the circumstances. Despite the fact that he treated her with much respect José was taciturn and demanding of her. Deprived of affection and companionship Morales grew quite accustomed to solitude.

In 1882 an infection in her knee led to the amputation of her leg, she was forced to walk with crutches. She found solace in spiritual reading. In 1885 she moved to a hospice run by the Carmelites, who taught her to sew. She remained there for almost a decade while she deepened her spiritual life and grew attracted to community life. She also met the priest Carlos Ferrís who would help her deepen her spiritual life. Although she wished to join the congregation, her health precluded that and in 1895 returned to her hometown with the idea of establishing a congregation with a special emphasis on caring for elderly women. To that end she consulted with spiritual directors as well as the Jesuits - in particular Martín Sánchez - and began to plan how she would go about this mission of hers. Her first aim was to establish special houses for women that were in need of assistance and the first house was opened in 1911 in Valencia. Others in places such as Barcelona and Santander soon opened. The General House was then established along with a novitiate and led to the formation of her own congregation. The sisters came to become known as "Angelicas".

Her ailments worsened in the 1950s which added to her deafness. Her congregation received the papal approval of Pope Pius XII in 1953. She resigned her post as Mother General in 1954.

Morales died at the beginning of 1956 in Zaragoza. She was granted the nickname of "Angel of Solitude" due to her peaceful and humorous disposition with a deep faith in Jesus Christ.

== Canonization ==
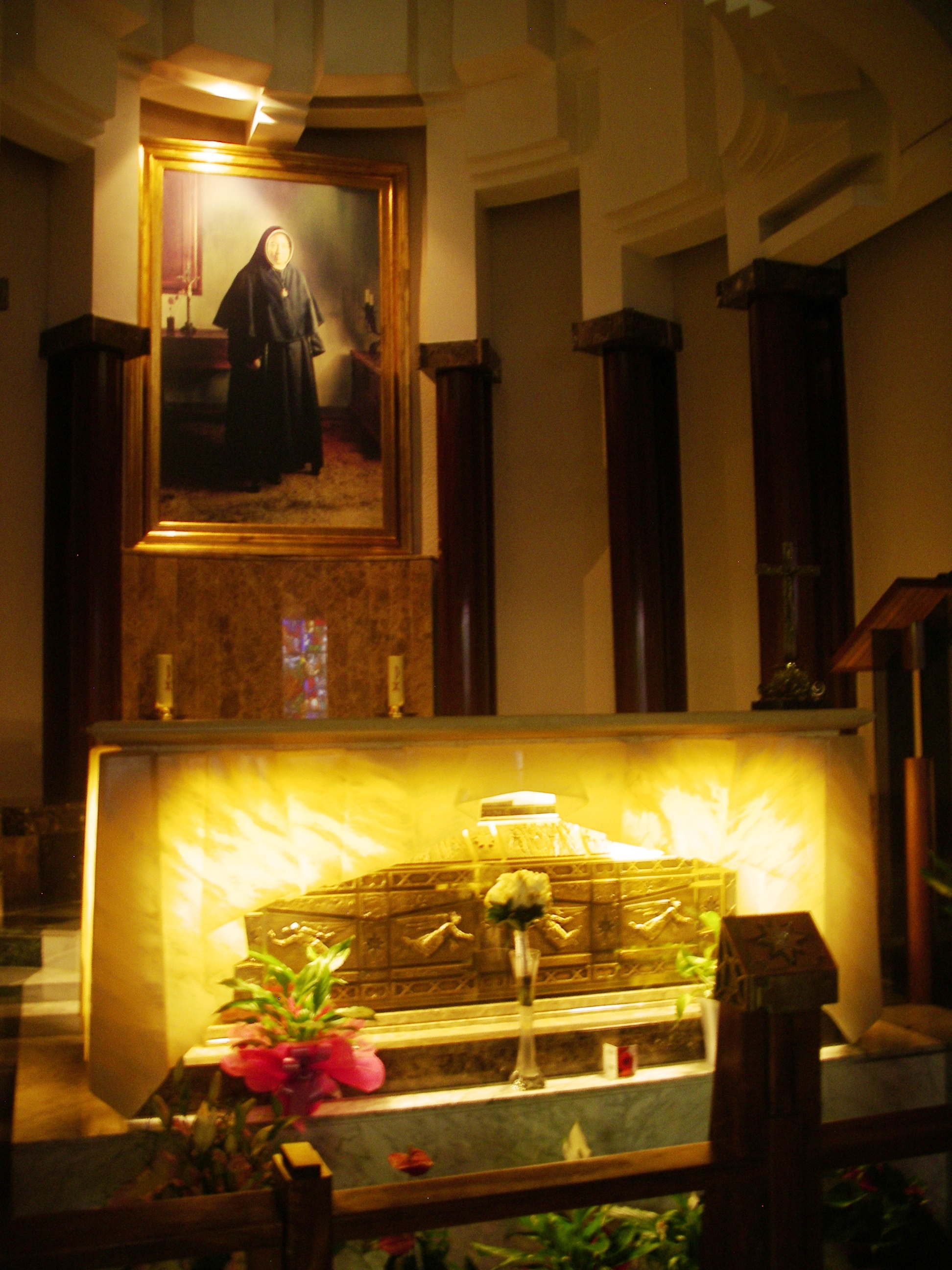
Tomb of St. Genoveva Torres Morales.

The canonization cause commenced in Zaragoza on 12 July 1975 under Pope Paul VI which conferred upon her the title of Servant of God. The process started with the accumulation of documentation and testimonies in a process that spanned from 5 January 1976 until 3 April 1978. The process was formally ratified on 11 November 1983, resulting in the Positio being submitted to the Congregation for the Causes of Saints in Rome in 1987. Pope John Paul II approved that she had lived a life of heroic virtue and declared her to be Venerable on 22 January 1991.

The miracle attributed to her intercession required for her beatification was investigated and ratified on 17 January 1992. John Paul II approved the miracle on 2 July 1994 and beatified her on 29 January 1995. The second miracle needed for canonization was ratified on 19 November 1999 and received papal approval, leading to John Paul II canonizing her on his visit to Spain on 4 May 2003.
