= Egidio Maria of Saint Joseph =

Christian saint

Saint Egidio Maria of Saint Joseph O.F.M.
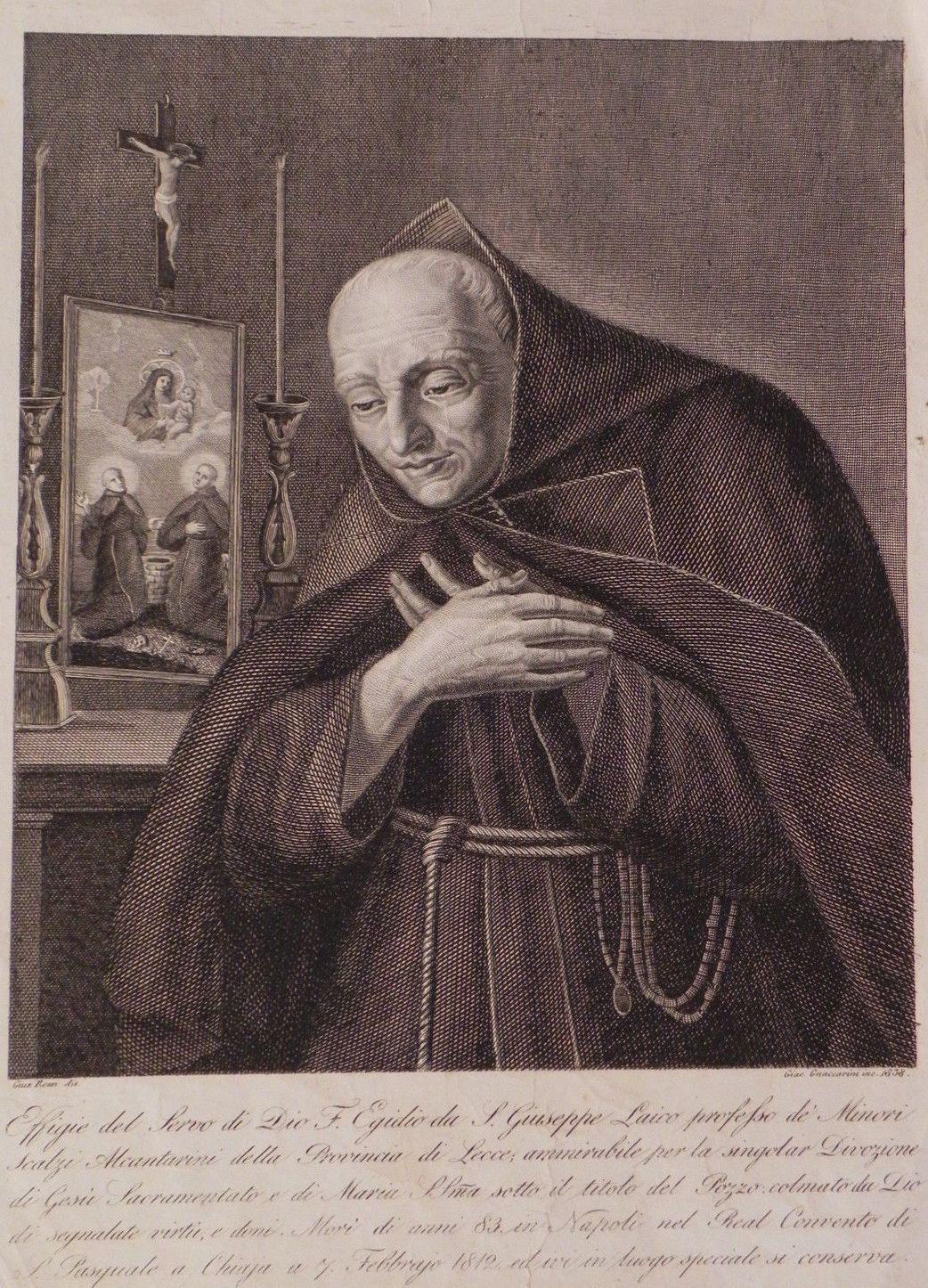
- Born: 16 November 1729; Taranto, Apulia, Kingdom of Naples
- Died: 7 February 1812 (aged 82); Naples, Kingdom of the Two Sicilies
- Venerated in: Roman Catholic Church
- Beatified: 5 February 1888, Saint Peter's Basilica, Kingdom of Italy by Pope Leo XIII
- Canonized: 2 June 1996, Saint Peter's Square, Vatican City by Pope John Paul II
- Feast: 7 February
- Attributes: Franciscan habit
- Patronage: Taranto; Ill people; Outcast people; Children; People looking for work

Egidio Maria of Saint Joseph (16 November 1729 – 7 February 1812) - born Francesco Pontillo - was an Italian professed religious of the Order of Friars Minor. Pontillo became a Franciscan brother rather than an ordained priest due to his lack of a proper education and so dedicated himself to the care of the poor and ill in southern Italian cities such as Taranto and Naples where he earned the moniker of the "Consoler of Naples".

== Life ==
Francesco Pontillo was born in Taranto on 16 November 1729 to Cataldo Postillo and Grazia Procaccio; three siblings later followed him. He was baptized as Francesco Domenico Antonio Pasquale Pontillo.

His father died in 1747 and this forced Pontillo to seek work to provide for his widowed mother and siblings. For a brief period of time he worked as a rope maker. The lack of a personal education meant that he was unable to become a priest and served instead as a professed religious in the Order of Friars Minor in Naples. He applied to enter the order on 27 February 1754 and made his solemn profession of vows on 28 February 1755 at the convent of Santa Maria delle Grazie in Galatone. He assumed the religious name of "Egidio of the Mother of God" but he later altered this instead to "Egidio Maria of Saint Joseph". Postillo served as a porter and gatekeeper at his convent and worked as a cook at the convent in Squinzano while also working with lepers; he often travelled outside the confines of his convent to beg for alms and to aid those who were shunned and isolated. Postillo spent almost a week at a convent in Capuso near Bari in 1759 when he was assigned to the convent of San Pasquale in Chiaia near Naples.

Pontillo died in Naples in 1812. His death came as a result of severe sciatica coupled with severe asthma and then dropsy. His remains are housed at San Pasquale convent's adjacent church in Chiaia.

== Sainthood ==
The process for sainthood commenced in Naples in an informative process that Cardinal Filippo Giudice Caracciolo opened and later closed in 1843. Pope Pius IX named him as venerable on 24 February 1868 after confirming that Postillo had lived a model life of heroic virtue. Pope Leo XIII beatified Postillo on 5 February 1888 after the confirmation of two miracles attributed to his intercession. On 29 June 1919 the Archbishop of Taranto Orazio Mazzella named him the patron of Taranto.

The cause for Postillo's canonization was formally opened on 14 March 1952. A third miracle was investigated and received validation from the Congregation for the Causes of Saints on 2 October 1992 which led to a medical board approving it on 27 January 1994; theologians did likewise on 13 May 1994 as did the C.C.S. on 18 October 1994. Pope John Paul II declared the healing to be a miracle - the 1937 cure of Mrs. Angela Mignogna - on 15 December 1994 and canonized Postillo on 2 June 1996.

His liturgical feast is celebrated on the date of his death.
