= Juan García López-Rico =

Spanish Catholic priest (1561–1613)

Saint John Baptist of the Conception Juan García López-Rico O.SS.T.
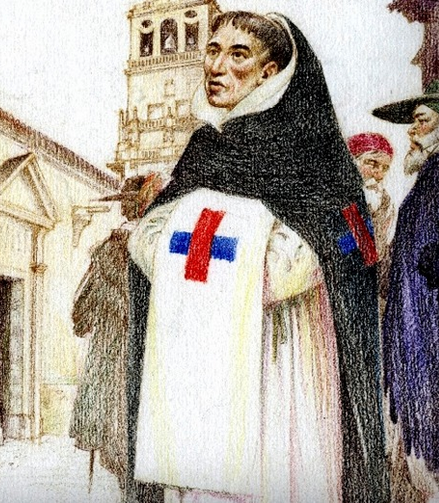

Priest
- Born: 10 July 1561; Almodóvar del Campo, Ciudad Real, Spain
- Died: 14 February 1613 (aged 51); Córdoba, Spain
- Venerated in: Roman Catholic Church
- Beatified: 26 September 1819, Saint Peter's Basilica, Papal States by Pope Pius VII
- Canonized: 25 May 1975, Saint Peter's Basilica, Vatican City by Pope Paul VI
- Feast: 14 February; 15 February (Córdoba & Ciudad Real)
- Attributes: Trinitarian habit; Crucifix
- Patronage: Trinitarians; Order of Discalced Trinitarians

Juan García López-Rico (10 July 1561 – 14 February 1613), known as John Baptist of the Conception, was a Spanish Roman Catholic priest from the Trinitarian Order who would establish a branch of his order which he named the Order of Discalced Trinitarians.

He made it his mission to renew his order and he became known as a great reformer of the aims and structure of his order which he had applied to the new one that he established. He was also a prolific writer on theological matters.

He was beatified in 1819 and was canonized in 1975.

== Life ==
Juan García López-Rico was born as the fifth of eight children in 1561 to Xixón and Isabel García Marcos López-Rico. He had eight siblings and three of his siblings entered into religious life. His religious calling manifested when he was fifteen.

At the age of fifteen he met Teresa of Avila. This awakened in him a calling to the Carmelites but instead he chose another order. He studied grammar with the Carmelites in Almodóvar del Campo and then commenced his theological studies in Baeza and Toledo. He assumed the habit of the Trinitarian Order at the age of nineteen on 28 June 1580 and made his religious profession on 29 June 1581. He was ordained to the priesthood in 1585. On 20 August 1599, he obtained approval for the reformation of the Trinitarians and was granted the approval of Pope Clement VIII. He drew his inspiration of reform from Teresa of Avila whom he had met in the past. He commenced his plan of reformation for the monasteries and continued despite opposition that he faced.

He died in 1613 of nephritis.

== Canonization ==
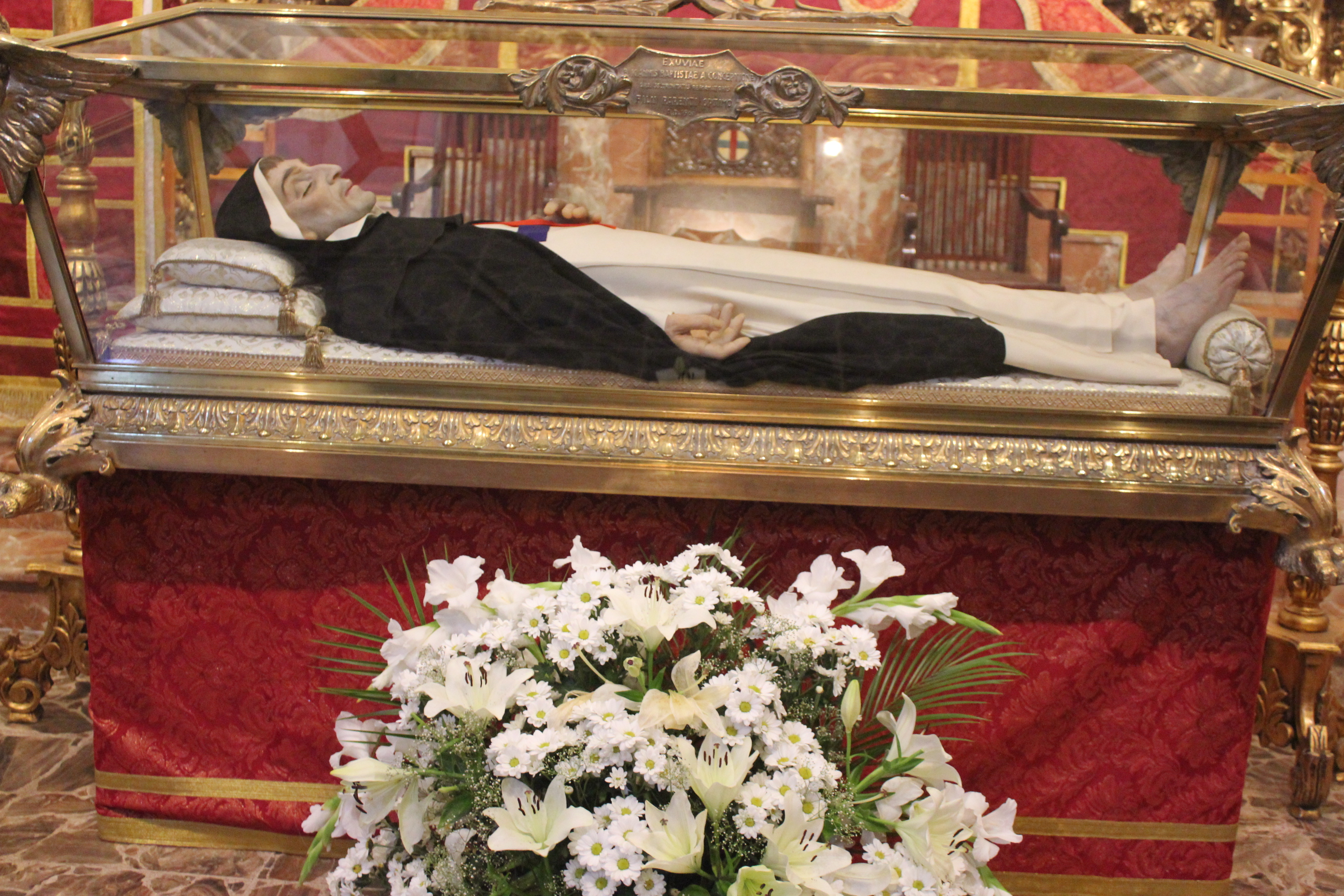
Tomb.

The process for canonization commenced under Pope Innocent XI on 16 February 1677 which granted him the posthumous title Servant of God. Two local processes to gather both testimonies and documentation were held in Spain and all the findings of both processes were sent to Rome for further evaluation. Pope Clement XIII approved that he had lived a life of heroic virtue and proclaimed him to be Venerable on 10 August 1760.

After the approval of two miracles attributed to his intercession, Pope Pius VII beatified him on 26 September 1819. The cause for his canonization was formally opened on 27 April 1865, and a third miracle was approved on 1 January 1881. Pope Paul VI canonized him on 25 May 1975.
