= Solomon Leclercq =

French Roman Catholic saint (1745–1792)

Saint Solomon Leclercq FSC
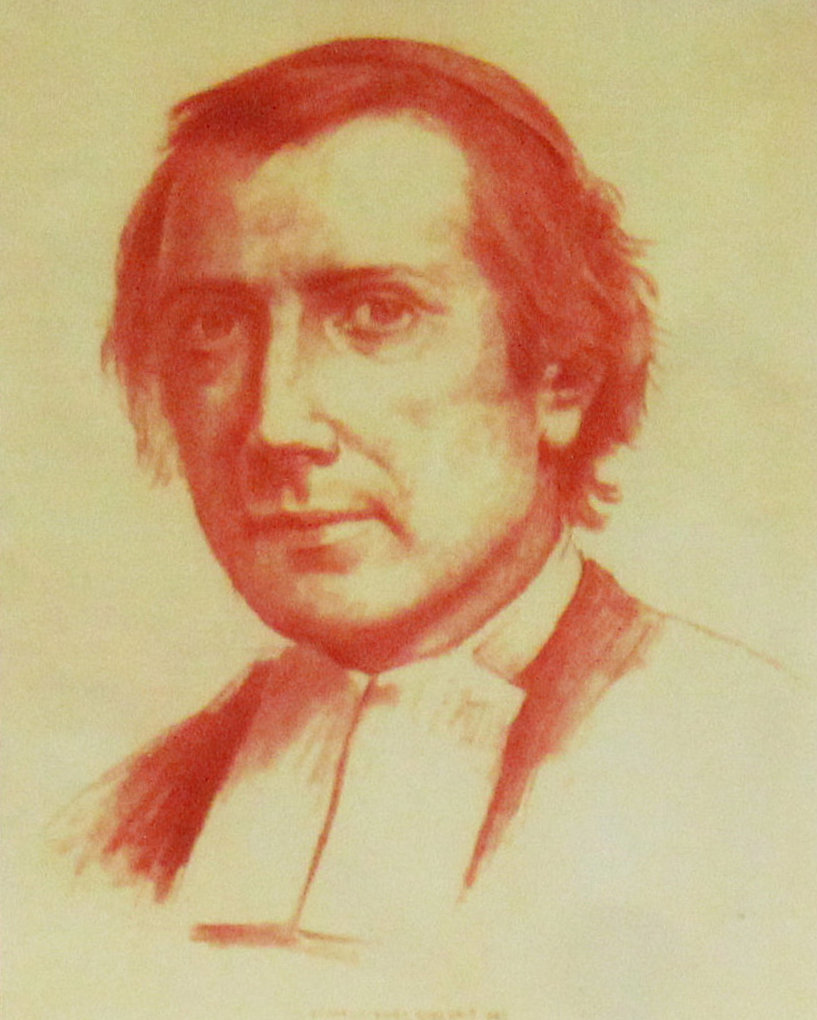

Martyr
- Born: 15 November 1745; Boulogne-ser-Mer, Pas-de-Calais, Kingdom of France
- Died: 2 September 1792 (aged 46); Hôtel des Carmes, Paris, Kingdom of France
- Venerated in: Roman Catholic Church
- Beatified: 17 October 1926, Saint Peter's Basilica by Pope Pius XI
- Canonized: 16 October 2016, Saint Peter's Square by Pope Francis
- Feast: 2 September

Solomon Leclercq, FSC (born Guillaume-Nicolas-Louis Leclercq; 15 November 1745 – 2 September 1792) was a French religious brother of the Institute of the De La Salle Brothers.

Leclercq was killed in 1792 after he refused to take the oath of allegiance to the new French Revolutionary government almost two weeks before the kingdom was dissolved. He was killed in the garden of a Carmelite convent around a fortnight after he had been arrested and imprisoned in Paris. He was the first Brother of the Christian Schools to be martyred, and the first to be beatified. His canonization was celebrated on 16 October 2016; his feast day is September 2.

== Life ==
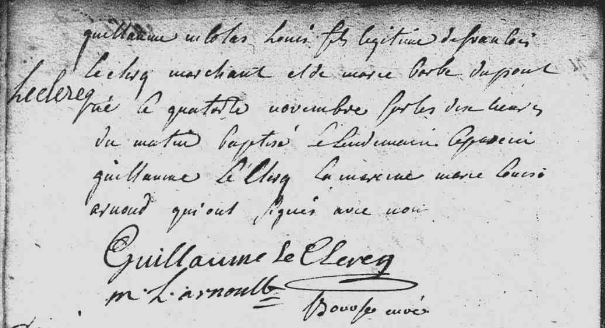
Baptismal record.

Guillaume-Nicolas-Louis Leclercq was born to a family of merchants in Boulogne-sur-Mer, on 15 November 1745. He attended a school run by the Brothers of the Christian Schools, and worked in the family business for a time.

He entered the novitiate at the Institute of the Brothers of the Christian Schools in Rouen on 25 March 1767. He took his vows in 1769 and in September 1770 was sent to teach at Maréville. Leclercq is described as "... quiet, gentle, and somewhat shy, but also engaged and firm". He made his final profession in 1772. The following year he became director of novices at Maréville. Leclercq was made procurator in 1777 of Maréville and in 1780 was sent to teach mathematics at the scholasticate in Melun. In 1787 he become secretary to the Superior General of the Congregation.

In 1790, during the French Revolution, the institute was designated as being illegal due to the members who refused to take the oath of allegiance to the new French government following the toppling of King Louis XVI. In 1791, the Brothers were forced to give up their schools, and to retire into civilian life. Brother Solomon stayed on at their property in Paris, dressed in ordinary clothes and looking after the house. Leclercq too refused to take the oath and despite being watched, he penned letters to his relatives. His last letter was dated on 15 August 1792. It was in this period of his life, around 1791, that he and the priest Clorivièm initiated plans to establish a new religious congregation – it was never to materialize.

Leclercq was arrested on 15 August 1792 and was imprisoned with priests and other religious at a Carmelite convent in Paris. Revolutionaries armed with swords killed them all on 2 September 1792 in the garden of the convent.

== Veneration ==
The process for Leclercq's canonization commenced in Paris on 21 March 1901 in a diocesan process for himself and his fellow 190 compatriots killed at the same time. The process was tasked with collating biographical evidence on them and attesting to their being killed in odium fidei ("in hatred of the faith"); the process concluded on 5 February 1906. The formal introduction of the cause received the approval of Pope Benedict XV on 26 January 1916 in a move that labelled Leclercq as a Servant of God.

A second process later was held and after it concluded, received the full ratification of the Congregation of Rites. His beatification received formal approval from Pope Pius XI on 1 October 1926; the pontiff beatified Leclercq and his 190 companions on 17 October 1926.

Following this, Solomon Leclercq's cause was separated from that of his compatriots and treated as a distinct cause. The 2007 occurrence regarded prima facie as a miracle, such as could lead to his eventual Canonization as a saint was investigated in the diocese of its origin in Venezuela from 19 January 2011 to 29 September 2011 and was then forwarded to the Congregation for the Causes of Saints in Rome for further investigation. There the board of medical consultants approved the miracle on 3 March 2016, and the following month, on 5 April 2016, a panel of theologians approved it. The Congregation itself approved the miracle on 3 May 2016 and presented it to Pope Francis, who approved the decision on 9 May 2016 and decreed that Solomon Leclercq would be canonized.

The date of canonization was decided at a meeting of cardinals on 20 June 2016 and the canonization itself was celebrated by Pope Francis in the course of a solemn Mass in Saint Peter's Square on 16 October 2016.
