= List of saints canonized by Pope Pius XII =

Pope Pius XII (1939–1958) canonized numerous saints, including Pope Pius X and Maria Goretti. He beatified Pope Innocent XI.

== The Saints ==
The first canonizations of Pope Pius XII were two women, the founder of a female order, Mary Euphrasia Pelletier, and a nanny and housekeeper, Gemma Galgani. Pelletier had a reputation for opening new ways for Catholic charities, helping people in difficulties with the law, who so far were neglected by the system and the Church. Galgani was an unknown woman whose virtue, charity and devotion became model by her canonization.

The saints are:

No.	Saint	Date of Canonization	Place of Canonization
1.	Mary Euphrasia Pelletier	2 May 1940	St. Peter's Basilica, Vatican City
2.	Gemma Galgani	2 May 1940	St. Peter's Basilica, Vatican City
3.	Margaret of Hungary	19 November 1943	Vatican City
4.	Frances Xavier Cabrini	7 July 1946	St. Peter's Square, Vatican City
5.	Nicholas of Flüe	15 May 1947	Vatican City
6.	Bernardino Realino	22 June 1947	Saint Peter's Basilica, Vatican City
7.	John de Brito	22 June 1947	Saint Peter's Basilica, Vatican City
8.	Joseph Cafasso	22 June 1947	Saint Peter's Basilica, Vatican City
9.	Jeanne-Elisabeth Bichier des Ages	6 July 1947	Saint Peter's Basilica, Vatican City
10.	Michael Garicoits	6 July 1947	Saint Peter's Basilica, Vatican City
11.	Louis de Montfort	20 July 1947	Saint Peter's Basilica, Vatican City
12.	Catherine Labouré	27 July 1947	Saint Peter's Basilica, Vatican City
13.	Jeanne de Lestonnac	15 May 1949	Rome, Italy
14.	Maria Giuseppa Rossello	12 June 1949	Saint Peter's Square, Vatican City
15.	Emilie de Rodat	23 April 1950	Saint Peter's Square, Vatican City
16.	Antonio Maria Claret	7 May 1950	Rome, Italy
17.	Bartolomea Capitanio	18 May 1950	Saint Peter's Basilica, Vatican City
18.	Vincenza Gerosa	18 May 1950	Saint Peter's Basilica, Vatican City
19.	Joan of France, Duchess of Berry	28 May 1950	Vatican City
20.	Vincent Strambi	11 June 1950	Rome, Italy
21.	Maria Goretti	24 June 1950	Saint Peter's Square, Vatican City
22.	Mariana de Jesús de Paredes	9 July 1950	Rome, Italy
23.	Emily de Vialar	24 June 1951	St. Peter's Basilica, Vatican City
24.	Maria Domenica Mazzarello	24 June 1951	St. Peter's Basilica, Vatican City
25.	Antonio Maria Gianelli	21 October 1951	Rome, Italy
26.	Francis Bianchi	21 October 1951	Rome, Italy
27.	Ignatius of Laconi	21 October 1951	Rome, Italy
28.	Pope Pius X	29 May 1954	Rome, Italy
29.	Dominic Savio	12 June 1954	Rome, Italy
30.	Gaspar del Bufalo	12 June 1954	Rome, Italy
31.	Joseph Pignatelli	12 June 1954	Rome, Italy
32.	Maria Crocifissa di Rosa	12 June 1954	Rome, Italy
33.	Peter Chanel	12 June 1954	Rome, Italy
34.	Hermann Joseph	11 August 1958	Rome, Italy

He named Saint Casimir the patron saint of all youth. Saint Catherine of Siena and Saint Francis of Assisi were named Patron Saints of Italy on 5 May 1940 just before Italy entered the Second World War.

Pope Pius XII opened the canonization procedures for Pope Pius IX, who was beatified by Pope John Paul II.

=== Pius X ===
On 29 May 1954, less than three years after his beatification, Pius X was canonized, following recognition of two more miracles. The first involved Francesco Belsami, an attorney from Naples who had a fatal pulmonary abscess, who was cured after placing a picture of Pope Pius X upon his chest. The second miracle involved Sr. Maria Ludovica Scorcia, a nun who had a serious neurotropic virus, and who, after several novenas, was entirely cured. The Canonization mass was presided over by Pius XII at Saint Peter's Basilica before a crowd of about 800,000 of the faithful and church officials at St. Peter's Basilica. Pius X became the first Pope to be canonized since the 17th century.

=== Maria Goretti ===
Pope Pius XII canonized Saint Maria Goretti as a virgin and martyr saint of the Roman Catholic Church. Maria's mother, nicknamed "Mamma Assunta" by her neighbors, was present at the ceremony; she was the first mother ever to attend the canonization ceremony of her child, along with her four remaining sons and daughters. Her murderer Alessendro also was present at the canonization.

Because of the huge number of visitors, the canonisation of Maria Goretti by Pope Pius XII, was held outside at Piazza San Pietro on 24 June 1950. The Pope spoke, not as before in Latin, but in Italian. "We order and declare, that the blessed Maria Goretti can be venerated as a Saint and We introduce her into the Canon of Saints". Some 500,000 people, among them a majority of youth, had come from around the World. Pope Pius asked them:

- Young people, pleasure of the eyes of Jesus, are you determined to resist any attack on your chastity with the help of grace of God?

A resounding Yes was the answer.

=== Innocent XI ===
Pope Innocent XI, personally a holy man, was highly controversial even hated, because of his opposition to the French monarchy and its aspirations for European hegemony; but also for his family's engagement in money-lending. He opposed French attempts to usurp the traditional liberties of the Church, for example in nominating its bishops. He opposed Gallicanism, the Gallican Liberties demanded by the French king. The case for his canonization was introduced in 1714 but the strong emotional and political influence of France forced a postponement until Pope Pius XII, who reintroduced the case, announced his beatification on 7 October 1956.

=== Placet Eugenio ===
The Placet Eugenio was the required final approval by the Pope of proposed candidates. Not all, who had passed the Vatican tribunals, received the Placet Eugenio. In one instance, Pius found, that the candidate, supposedly a model of virtue, had consistently used foul language. Refusing to accept the Vatican defense, that this kind of language was custom in that region, he stopped the proceedings shortly before their conclusion. Another person, belonging to a large religious order, was refused the honour of the altars, because he turned out to be a chain smoker. "Monsignore, as long as I am alive, this Causa will not find approval". This case too was almost completed and the relatives and members of the order were quite disappointed.

==== American Saints ====
According to Halecki and Murray, Pius has shown a particular interest in the discovery and recognition of sanctity among American religious leaders and pioneers of the Church movement. The first "American" saint was canonized during his pontificate, when Mother Cabrini, an Italian born nun with American citizenship, was raised to sainthood in St. Peter's Basilica. Pius also accelerated the canonization of other Americans, including American born Mother Seton of Emmitsburg, Maryland, founder of the Sisters of Charity. Fourteen months after his death, she was declared Venerable and was later beatified by Pope John XXIII and canonized by Pope Paul VI. Pope Pius supported also the case of an American Indian woman from the Mohawk tribe, Saint Kateri Tekakwitha, who was declared "Venerable" by him in 1943.

== Beatifications ==
Among the persons beatified by Pius XII, a majority are women, with Spanish, Italian and French backgrounds and others.

No.	Blessed	Date of Beatification	Place of Beatification
1.	Emily de Vialar	18 June 1939	Rome, Italy
2.	Justin de Jacobis	25 June 1939	St. Peter's Basilica, Vatican City
3.	Rose Philippine Duchesne	12 May 1940	St. Peter's Basilica, Vatican City
4.	Joaquina Vedruna de Mas	19 May 1940	Saint Peter's Basilica, Vatican City
5.	Maria Crocifissa di Rosa	26 May 1940	St. Peter's Basilica, Vatican City
6.	Émilie de Rodat	9 June 1940	St. Peter's Basilica, Vatican City
7.	Ignatius of Laconi	16 June 1940	Rome, Italy
8.	Magdalene of Canossa	7 December 1941	St. Peter's Basilica, Vatican City
9.	Sophie-Thérèse de Soubiran La Louvière	20 October 1946	St. Peter's Basilica, Vatican City
10.	Ignazia Verzeri	27 October 1946	St. Peter's Basilica, Vatican City
11.	The Franciscan Martyrs of China	24 November 1946	St. Peter's Basilica, Vatican City
12.	Contardo Ferrini	13 April 1947	Saint Peter's Square, Vatican City
13.	Maria Goretti	27 April 1947	Rome, Italy
14.	Alix Le Clerc	4 May 1947	Vatican City
15.	Jeanne Delanoue	8 November 1947	Saint Peter's Square, Vatican City
16.	Benildus Romancon	4 April 1948	Vatican City
17.	Vincent Pallotti	22 January 1950	Rome, Italy
18.	Maria Soledad Torres y Acosta	5 February 1950	Vatican City
19.	Vincentia Maria López y Vicuña	19 February 1950	St. Peter's Basilica, Vatican City
20.	Dominic Savio	5 March 1950	Rome, Italy
21.	Paola Elisabetta Cerioli	19 March 1950	Saint Peter's Basilica, Vatican City
22.	Anne-Marie Javouhey	15 October 1950	Rome, Italy
23.	Marguerite Bourgeoys	12 November 1950	Rome, Italy
24.	Francis Fasani	15 April 1951	Rome, Italy
25.	25 Vietnamese Martyrs	29 April 1951	Saint Peter's Basilica, Vatican City
26.	Placide Viel	6 May 1951	Saint Peter's Basilica, Vatican City
27.	Julian Maunoir	20 May 1951	Saint Peter's Basilica, Vatican City
28.	Pope Pius X	3 June 1951	Saint Peter's Basilica, Vatican City
29.	Thérèse Couderc	4 November 1951	Saint Peter's Basilica, Vatican City
30.	Rose Venerini	4 May 1952	Rome, Italy
31.	Rafaela Porras Ayllón	18 May 1952	Saint Peter's Basilica, Vatican City
32.	Maria Bertilla Boscardin	8 June 1952	Saint Peter's Basilica, Vatican City
33.	Antonio Maria Pucci	12 June 1952	Saint Peter's Basilica, Vatican City
34.	Maria Assunta Pallotta	7 November 1954	St. Peter's Basilica, Vatican City
35.	Jean-Martin Moye	21 November 1954	Rome, Italy
36.	Tommaso Riccardi	5 December 1954	St. Peter's Basilica, Vatican City
37.	Marcellin Champagnat	29 May 1955	St. Peter's Basilica, Vatican City
38.	The 19 Martyrs of Laval	19 June 1955	Rome, Italy
39.	Pope Innocent XI	7 October 1956	St. Peter's Basilica, Vatican City
40.	Eugénie Smet	26 May 1957	Rome, Italy
41.	Teresa Jornet Ibars	27 April 1958	Saint Peter's Basilica, Vatican City

== See also ==
- List of saints canonized by Pope Leo XIII
- List of saints canonized by Pope Pius XI
- List of saints canonized by Pope John XXIII
- List of saints canonized by Pope Paul VI
- List of saints canonized by Pope John Paul II
- List of saints canonized by Pope Francis

== Sources ==
- Oskar Halecki, James Murray Jr. Pius XII, Eugenio Pacelli, Pope of Peace, New York, 1954
- Pascalina Lehnert, Pius XII, Ich durfte ihm dienen, Würzburg, 1982
- Jan Olav Smit, Pope Pius XII, London & Dublin 1951
