= María Josefa Sancho de Guerra =

Spanish Roman Catholic nun

Saint María Josefa Sancho de Guerra
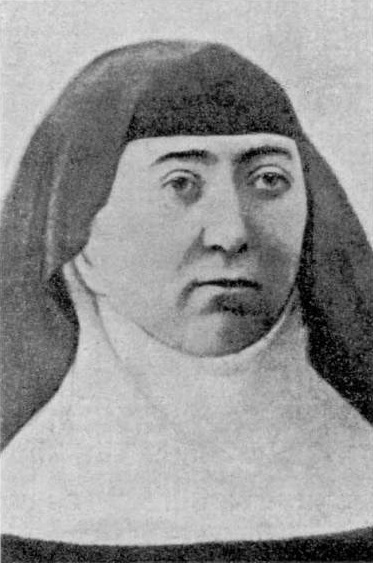
- María Josefa Sancho de Guerra, circa 1910.

Religious and Foundress
- Born: 7 September 1842; Vitoria, Álava, Spain
- Died: 20 March 1912 (aged 69); Bilbao, Vizcaya, Spain
- Venerated in: Roman Catholic Church
- Beatified: 27 September 1992, Saint Peter's Square, Vatican City by Pope John Paul II
- Canonized: 1 October 2000, Saint Peter's Square, Vatican City by Pope John Paul II
- Feast: 20 March
- Attributes: Book; Religious habit; Sash; Rosary
- Patronage: Servants of Jesus of Charity

María Josefa Sancho de Guerra (7 September 1842 – 20 March 1912) was a Spanish Roman Catholic nun who established her own congregation known as the Servants of Jesus of Charity. She wanted her new congregation to focus on the care of the sick and the poor. She assumed the religious name of "María Josefa of the Heart of Jesus".

Pope John Paul II beatified her on 27 September 1992 and canonized her on 1 October 2000.

== Life ==
María Josefa Sancho de Guerra was born on 7 September 1842 in Spain as the eldest daughter of Bernabe Sancho and Petra de Guerra. She was baptized the following day. She received the sacrament of Confirmation on 10 August 1844. At the age of seven, her father died and her mother took charge of her spiritual development. Her mother also sent her to her relatives in Madrid for further education.

At the age of 18, she returned to Vitoria to announce to her mother her desire to join a monastery, responding to her vocation, repeatedly telling her: "I was born with a religious vocation". She joined the Institute of the Servants of Mary at the age of 18 but by the time she approached her time for profession, she was aware of uncertainties about her vocation. Telling various confessors, each told her that she had misinterpreted her vocation. After a brief period, she decided to leave the order to establish her own congregation.

She established a new congregation known as the Servants of Jesus of Charity in 1871 with a focus on the care of children, the sick, the elderly and the poor. She was its first Mother Superior. At that point, she selected as her new name "María Josefa of the Heart of Jesus".

She died on 20 March 1912. Her remains were transferred in 1926 from the local cemetery to the motherhouse of the institute. Her institute expanded after her death with over 100 houses in many different countries such as Chile, Italy, France, Portugal, Argentina, Paraguay, Colombia, Ecuador, Peru, Mexico, the Philippines and the Dominican Republic.

== Canonization ==
The sainthood process commenced in Bilbao with the opening of a local process in 1951 which finished in 1954. The formal introduction of the cause came on 7 January 1972 which granted her the title of Servant of God. The Positio – documentation on her life of heroic virtue – was submitted to the Congregation for the Causes of Saints in 1984. Pope John Paul II approved the findings and conferred upon her the title of Venerable on 7 September 1989.

The miracle required for her beatification was investigated and ratified on 8 June 1990 leading to papal approval on 13 June 1992. She was beatified on 27 September 1992. The second miracle that was needed for her canonization was also investigated after her beatification and was ratified on 13 October 1995. John Paul II approved it on 28 June 1999 and canonized her on 1 October 2000.
