= Rosa Francisca Dolors Molas Vallvé =

Spanish Roman Catholic religious sister

Saint Rosa Francisca Dolors Molas Vallvé
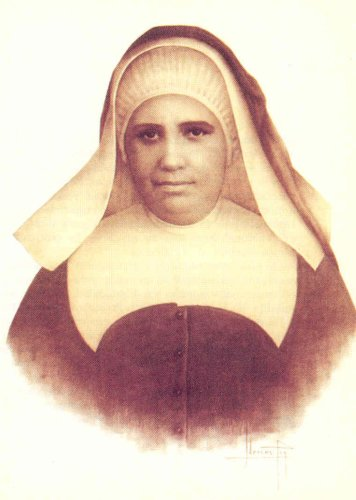
- c. 1870.

Nun
- Born: 24 March 1815; Reus, Tarragona, Kingdom of Spain
- Died: 11 June 1876 (aged 61); Tortosa, Tarragona, Kingdom of Spain
- Venerated in: Roman Catholic Church
- Beatified: 1 May 1977, Saint Peter's Basilica, Vatican City by Pope Paul VI
- Canonized: 11 December 1988, Saint Peter's Basilica, Vatican City by Pope John Paul II
- Feast: 9 February
- Attributes: Nun's habit
- Patronage: Sisters of Our Lady of Consolation

Rosa Francisca Dolors Molas Vallvé (24 March 1815 – 11 June 1876) was a Spanish Roman Catholic religious sister. Following her solemn religious profession she assumed the name of "Maria Rosa" and also established the religious congregation known as the Sisters of Our Lady of Consolation.

Vallvé decided that her order would be devoted to women and to service of the poor who most needed aid.

Pope Paul VI beatified her in mid-1977 and she was canonized in late 1988 after recognition of three miracles attributed to her intercession. She is a patron saint of her congregation.

== Life ==
Rosa Francisca Dolors Molas Vallvé was born on 24 March 1815 in Spain to Jose Molas and Maria Vallvé, and baptized the following day. As a child she was known for her intuitive and sensitive nature, with tenderness toward the poor and to those on the peripheries. She wanted to devote herself to alleviating the suffering of those peoples.

With her First Communion came the birth of her religious calling and the determination to consecrate herself to God as a professed religious, assuming the name of "Maria Rosa". In January 1841 she entered the Corporation Sisters of Charity who served in a hospital in Reus. She remained in the city on 11 June 1844 to help people despite the bombardment of the city by the troops of General Zurbano. She later went with her fellow sisters to Tortosa in 1849 where the scope of her mission expanded.

On 14 March 1857 she established her own religious congregation for women to assist in aiding the poor and outcasts. On 14 November 1858 she named the congregation the Sisters of Our Lady of Consolation

In May 1876 she could feel that her health was slowly declining and that her end was near. She remarked to her confessor: "The holy will of God be done". She died on 11 June 1876.

== Sainthood ==
=== The process ===
Vallvé's spiritual writings were approved by theologians on 12 December 1941. The canonization process commenced under Pope Pius XII on 27 July 1951 with the commencement of two local processes in Spain that would collect documents and witness testimonies in order to compile the Positio. The commencement of the cause gave her the title Servant of God and the processes were both ratified on 23 November 1956 so that the cause could proceed to the next stage.

The documentation did not receive consideration until almost a decade after and it culminated on 4 October 1974 when Pope Paul VI proclaimed her to be Venerable after recognizing the fact that she lived a life of heroic virtue.

=== Beatification ===
The diocesan tribunal for the evaluation of two miracles commenced and concluded in 1954 and was ratified on 23 November 1956 along with the process for the accumulation of documentation. It was not until two decades later that the Congregation for the Causes of Saints in Rome began to evaluate it. On 20 January 1977 the Pope approved them and beatified her on 1 May 1977.

The miracle was the healing of Elvira Ruiz Llopis who had severe peritonitis and was taken to hospital on 4 October 1944 where the sisters running the hospital prayed for the intercession of Vallvé. Against all odds of survival, she recovered from her ailment.

=== Canonization ===
The miracle for canonization was also investigated and was ratified in 1987. Pope John Paul II approved it on 28 March 1988 and canonized her on 11 December 1988.
