= Paola Elisabetta Cerioli =

Italian Roman Catholic saint

Saint Paola Elisabetta Cerioli

Religious
- Born: 28 January 1816; Soncino, Cremona, Kingdom of Lombardy–Venetia
- Died: 24 December 1865 (aged 49); Comonte di Seriate, Bergamo, Kingdom of Italy
- Venerated in: Roman Catholic Church
- Beatified: 19 March 1950, Saint Peter's Basilica, Vatican City by Pope Pius XII
- Canonized: 16 May 2004, Saint Peter's Square, Vatican City by Pope John Paul II
- Patronage: Institute of Sisters of the Holy Family; Family of Bergamo

Paola Elisabetta Cerioli (28 January 1816 – 24 December 1865), born Costanza Cerioli, was an Italian Roman Catholic widow and the founder of both the Institute of Sisters of the Holy Family and the congregation of the Family of Bergamo.

Pope Pius XII beatified her on 19 March 1950 while Pope John Paul II canonized her in 2004.

== Life ==
=== Childhood ===
Costanza Cerioli was born in 1816 in Soncino, Lombardy as the last of sixteen children of Francesco Cerioli and Francesca Corniani. Her parents were members of the nobility.

At the age of eleven in 1827 she was sent to school in Bergamo where she would be educated until 1832. She was a frail child plagued with a heart condition throughout her life. Though she became somewhat of a loner the experience helped her religious convictions and aided her in granting her inner strength and further motivation.

=== Marriage ===
Cerioli returned to Soncino where an arranged marriage awaited her. At the age of nineteen in 1835 she married Gaetano Busecchi (aged 59) - the widower of a countess. She accepted the proposal and was married on 30 April 1835. During the marriage - which lasted for 19 years - she had to deal with her husband's difficult character and poor health. Of the four children she gave birth to three of them died after being premature. Her sole child Carlo died at the age of sixteen due to a serious illness in January 1854. In 1854 her husband also died leaving her widowed.

=== Religious life ===
Following the death of her husband and son she entered into a deep mourning period. She was able to find guidance in God and the religious life. At the age of 38 she began to assist the poor and she opened the family’s country residence as a home for orphaned girls.

Cerioli decided to devote the remainder of her life to charity and contemplative prayer. She took a vow of chastity on 25 December 1856 which was soon followed by her vows of poverty and obedience on 8 February 1857 and founded the Institute of the Sisters of the Holy Family in Comonte to care for abandoned children and to assist new parents. It was during this time that Cerioli took the name of Paola Elisabetta. The men's Congregation of the Holy Family was founded on 4 November 1863. That year she opened another country house, the Villacampagna di Soncino for orphaned boys.

Paola Elisabetta died in her home in Comonte on 24 December 1865 at the age 49.

== Legacy ==
Paola Elisabetta was beatified by Pope Pius XII on March 19, 1950 and canonized on Pope John Paul II on 16 May 2004.

In a homily on 16 May 2004 John Paul II said, "Paola Elisabetta understood that families remain strong when the bonds among their members are sustained and kept together by sharing the values of faith and a Christian way of life."
