= List of saints canonized by Pope John XXIII =

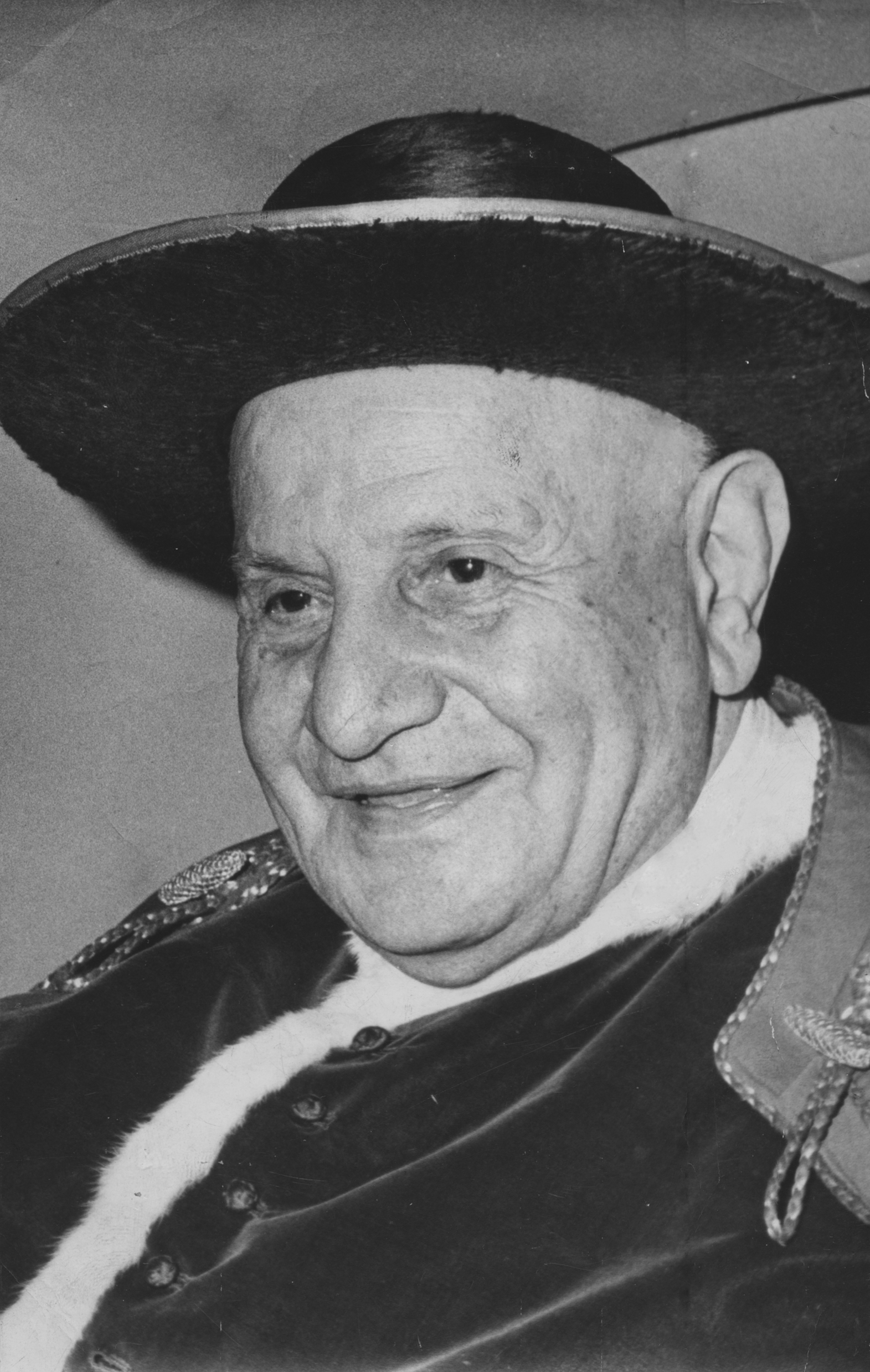
Pope John XXIII in February 1963

This article is a list of saints canonized by Pope John XXIII.

No.	Saint	Date of Canonization	Place of Canonization	Reference
1.	Charles of Sezze	12 April 1959	St. Peter's Basilica	
2.	Joaquina Vedruna de Mas	12 April 1959	St. Peter's Basilica	
3.	Gregorio Barbarigo	26 May 1960	St. Peter's Basilica	
4.	Juan de Ribera	12 June 1960	St. Peter's Basilica	
5.	Maria Bertilla Boscardin	11 May 1961	St. Peter's Basilica	
6.	Martin de Porres	6 May 1962	St. Peter's Basilica	
7.	Antonio Maria Pucci	9 December 1962	St. Peter's Basilica	
8.	Francis Mary of Camporosso	9 December 1962	St. Peter's Basilica	
9.	Peter Julian Eymard	9 December 1962	St. Peter's Basilica	
10.	Vincent Pallotti	20 January 1963	St. Peter's Basilica	

== See also ==
- List of saints canonized by Pope Pius XII
- List of saints canonized by Pope Paul VI
- List of saints canonized by Pope John Paul II
- List of saints canonized by Pope Benedict XVI
- List of saints canonized by Pope Francis
