= Equivalent canonization =

Canonization process used for beatified who already have a cultus

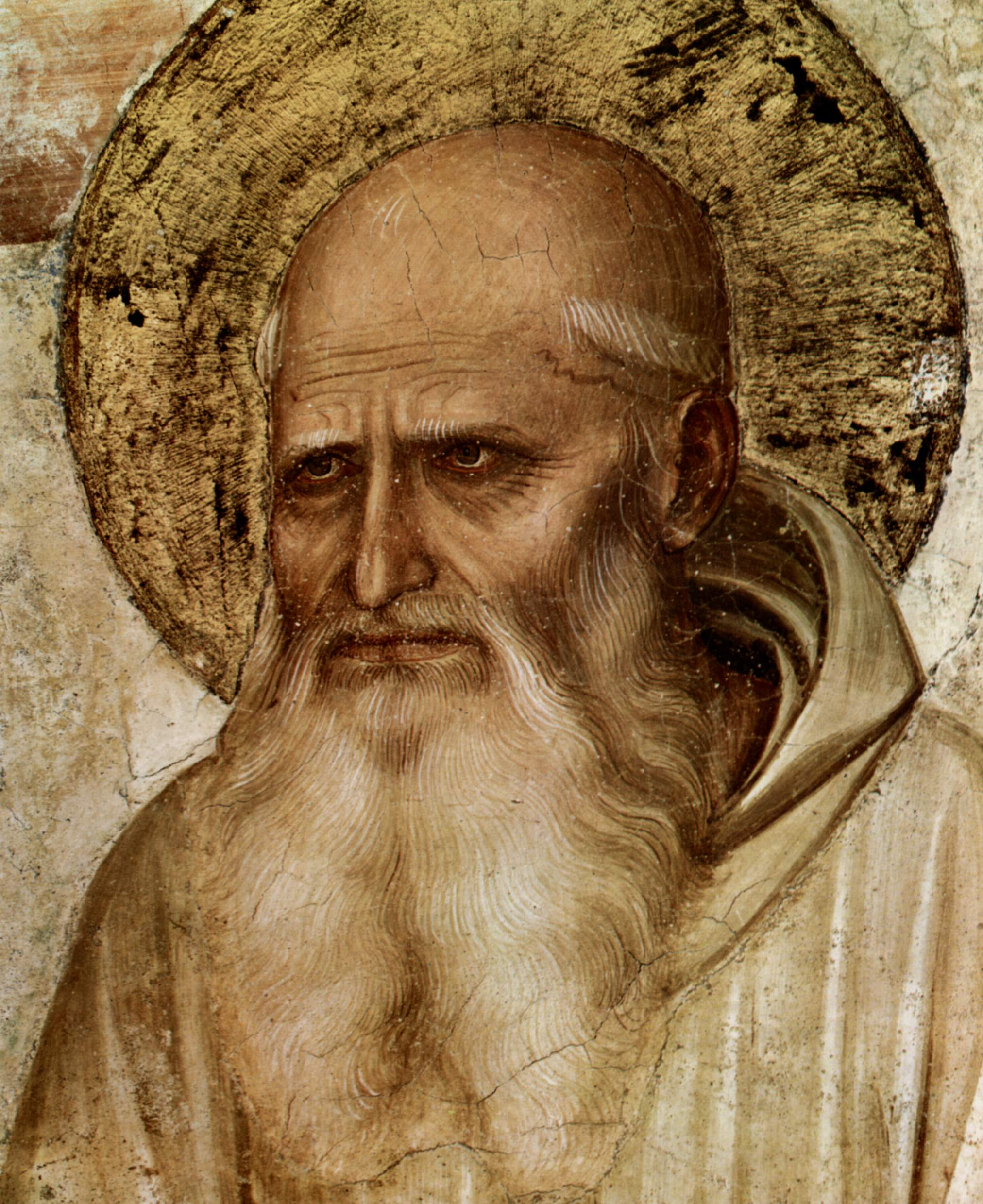
The hermit Romuald, founder of the Camaldolese order, was one of the first saints to receive an equivalent canonization (in 1595).

Through an equivalent (also equipollent) beatification or canonization, a pope can choose to relinquish the judicial processes, formal attribution of miracles, and scientific examinations that are typically involved in beatification or canonization. This can take place when the person has been venerated since ancient times by the faithful.

== History ==
The veneration of martyrs and other saints is attested from the first centuries of the Church. However, canonization as an ecclesiastical procedure was not outlined until the 11th century with the aim of seeking to define those Christians who would deserve the universal reverence of the Church, thus avoiding confusion between local churches and seeking that the virtues of the deceased were fully proven. Already during this time the authority of the pope was appealed to claim to him or to the synods the power to determine said cult.

In the 17th century, Urban VIII began to make pontifical declarations of canonization through papal bulls, the first canonized saints being Philip Neri, Ignatius of Loyola, and Francis Xavier, and in other bulls Urban would decree the beatification of other Servants of God. Similarly, in 1634, through the bull Caelestis Hierusalem cives, he established such powers of beatification and canonization as exclusive to the Holy See.

In the first half of the 18th century, Bishop Prospero Lambertini, before being elected as pope under the name of Benedict XIV, published his major liturgical work entitled De servorum Dei beatificatione et de beatorum canonizatione, where he expounded the procedure of equivalent canonization and described the possibility of establishing public veneration for a person whose reputation for holiness and heroic virtue has long been proven by tradition and for whom there was already a prior veneration in the Church.

This has been reiterated since then by various pontiffs up to the present. The most recent provisions regarding the canonization process have not repealed it as a valid practice, exclusive to the pope.

Various saints have been included in the martyrology in this way, including Romuald, Norbert of Xanten, Bruno of Cologne, Peter Nolasco, Raymond Nonnatus, John of Matha, Felix of Valois, Margaret of Scotland, Stephen I of Hungary, and Pope Gregory VII. Some of the most recent cases of equivalent canonization were that of Hildegard of Bingen on 10 May 2012, 833 years after her death; that of Angela of Foligno on 9 October 2013, 704 years after her death; that of Peter Faber on 17 December 2013, 467 years after his death; and that of Joseph of Anchieta on 3 April 2014, 416 years after his death.

== List ==
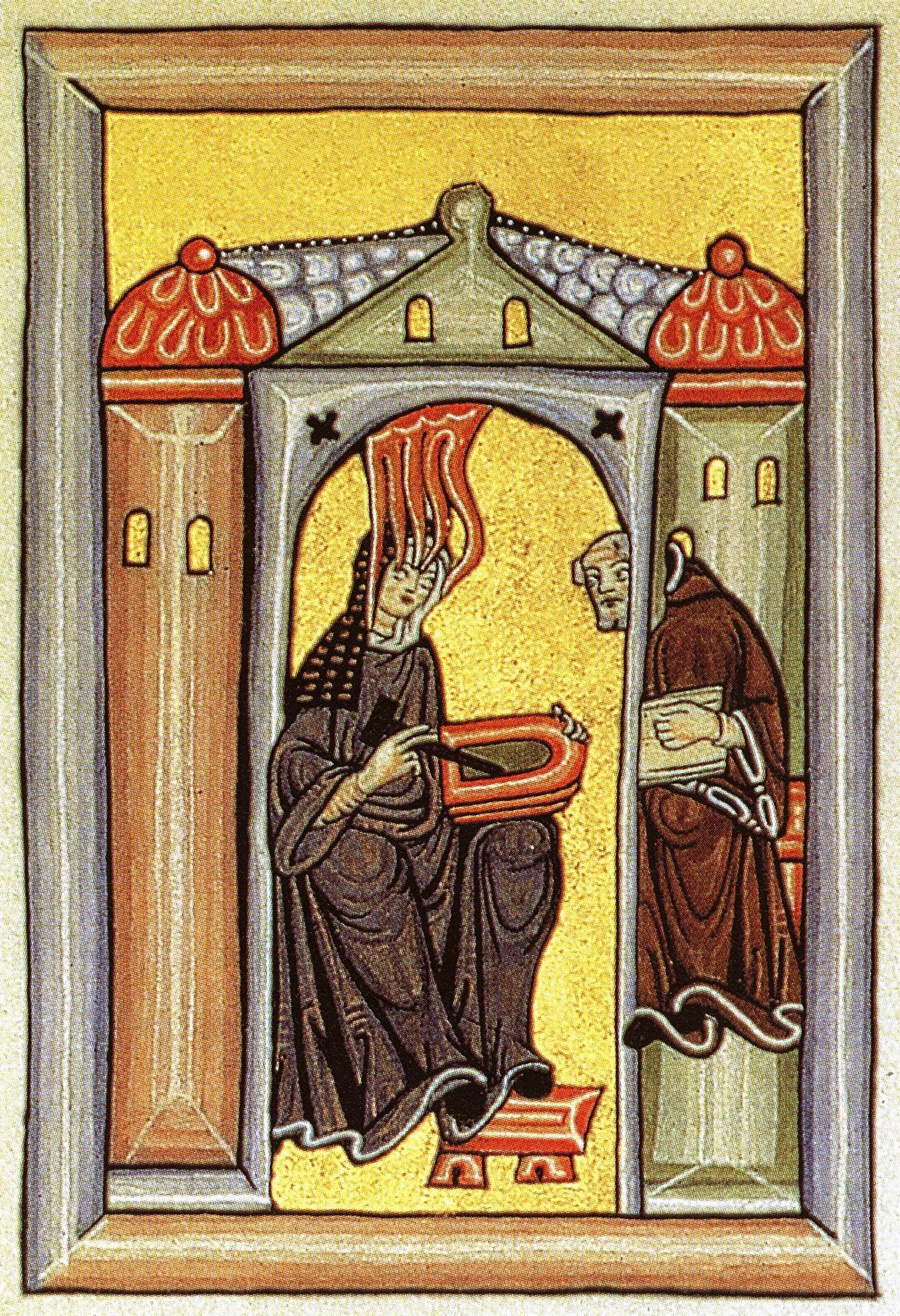
Hildegard of Bingen, a Doctor of the Church, was equivalently canonized in 2012.

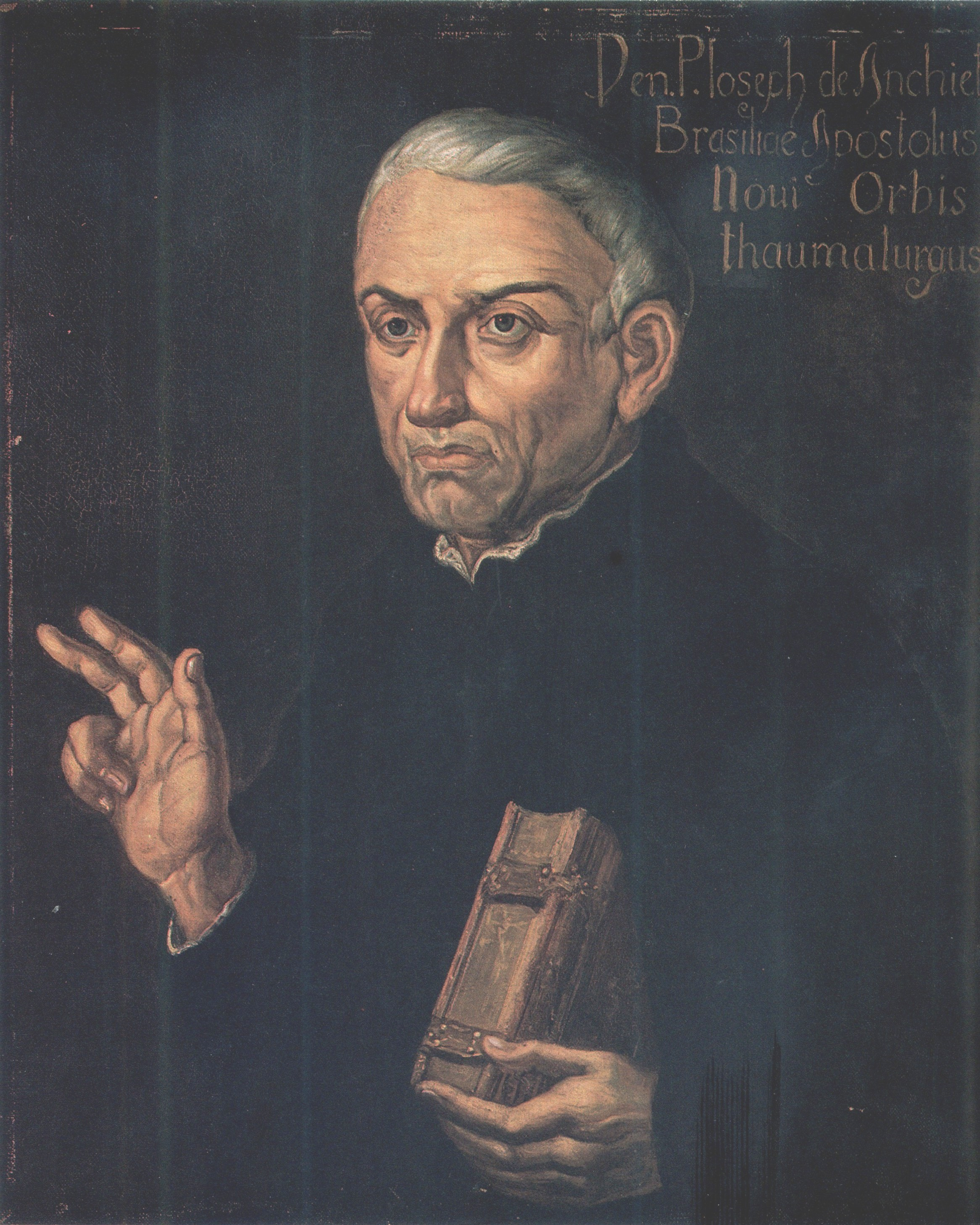
Saint Joseph of Anchieta, canonized in 2014 by Pope Francis.

As examples, prior to his pontificate, of this mode of canonization, Pope Benedict XIV enumerated the equipollent canonizations of saints:

- Romuald – 9 July 1595
- Norbert of Xanten – 7 September 1621
- Bruno of Cologne – 6 October 1623
- Pope Gregory VII – 25 September 1728
- Duke Wenceslaus of Bohemia – 14 March 1729
- Gertrude of Helfta – 20 July 1738

Further equipollent canonizations include those of saints:

- Guillaume Pinchon, Bishop of Saint-Brieuc – 24 March 1247
- Gottfried von Cappenberg, OPraem – 8 March 1728
- Peter Damian – 1 October 1828
- Guido, bishop of Acqui – 22 September 1859
- Vibiana – February 1854
- Cyril and Methodius – 30 September 1880
- Cyril of Alexandria – 28 July 1882
- Cyril of Jerusalem – 28 July 1882
- Justin Martyr – 28 July 1882
- Augustine of Canterbury – 28 July 1882
- John of Damascus – 29 August 1890
- Sylvester Gozzolini – 29 August 1890
- Bede the Venerable – 25 May 1899
- Ephrem the Syrian – 5 October 1920
- Albert the Great – 15 December 1931
- John Fisher – 19 May 1935
- Thomas More – 19 May 1935
- Gregorio Barbarigo – 26 May 1960
- Berthold of Garsten – 8 January 1970
- Meinhard of Livonia – 8 September 1993
- Hildegard of Bingen – 10 May 2012

Pope Francis added:

- Angela of Foligno – 9 October 2013
- Peter Faber – 17 December 2013
- Joseph of Anchieta – 3 April 2014
- Marie of the Incarnation – 3 April 2014
- François de Laval – 3 April 2014
- Bartholomew of Braga – 5 July 2019
- Margaret of Castello – 24 April 2021
- Martyrs of Compiègne – 18 December 2024
