= Regina degli Apostoli alla Montagnola =

Regina Apostolorum
- Basilica of Saint Mary Queen of the Apostles in Montagnola (in English)
- Click on the map for a fullscreen view
- 41°51′13″N 12°28′59″E
- Location: Via Antonino Pio 75, Rome
- Country: Italy
- Denomination: Roman Catholic
- Tradition: Roman Rite

History
- Status: Titular church, minor basilica
- Dedication: Mary, mother of Jesus (as Queen of the Apostles)

Architecture
- Architect: Leone Favini
- Architectural type: Church
- Style: Baroque Revival
- Groundbreaking: 1947

Administration
- District: Lazio

The Basilica di Santa Maria Regina degli Apostoli alla Montagnola, entrusted to the care of the Society of St. Paul (Paolini), is located in Via Antonino Pio, in the Ostiense quarter of the city of Rome, Italy.

== History ==
Built between 1945 and 1954, the church was commissioned by Blessed James Alberione, in fulfilment of a vow made during the bombardments of World War II. It was designed by architect Leone Favini and is inspired by Roman Baroque architecture. The plan of the church is marked exteriorly and interiorly by its large dome. The interior is notable for a series of frescoes commissioned by the Founder and accomplished by the artist G.A. Santagata, depicting Marian images, among them a fresco showing the Virgin Mary seated among the Apostles as the Holy Spirit descends upon them.

== Cardinalatial Titular Church ==
Pope Paul VI established the church as a cardinalatial Titular Church on 25 February 1965.

The Cardinal priests who have been assigned to this title to date are:

- Ermenegildo Florit, 25 February 1965 appointed-8 December 1985 died
- Giuseppe Sensi, 22 June 1987 appointed-26 July 2001 died
- Virgilio Noè, 22 February 2002 appointed-24 July 2011 died
- John Tong Hon, 18 February 2012 appointed- present

== Parish Church ==
On October 26, 1976, the church was established as a parish church of the diocese of Rome by the decree Pastorali munere issued by the Cardinal Vicar, Ugo Poletti. In April 1984 the Holy See granted the church the dignity of a minor basilica.

== The Pauline Family ==
The church was founded by Father Giacomo Alberione, founder of the Society of St. Paul, of the Daughters of St. Paul, and other religious institutes which form the Pauline Family. The church is attached to the Mother House of the Society of St. Paul.

In the church are the tombs of Blessed Giacomo Alberione, of Blessed Giuseppe Giaccardo (1896-1948), a priest of the Society of St. Paul, and that of Mother Thecla (Maria Teresa) Merlo (1894-1964), co-founder of the Daughters of St. Paul.

Despite the similar title, the church is unrelated to the Pontifical Athenaeum Regina Apostolorum, an educational institute in Rome directed by the Congregation of the Legionaries of Christ.
