= Maria Domenica Mantovani =

Beatified Italian nun (1862–1934)

Saint Maria Domenica Mantovani
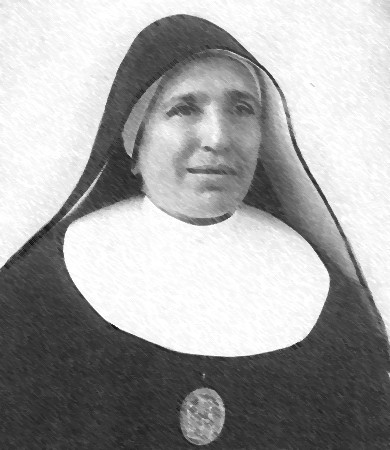

Religious
- Born: 12 November 1862; Castelletto di Brenzone, Verona, Kingdom of Lombardy–Venetia
- Died: 2 February 1934 (aged 71); Verona, Kingdom of Italy
- Venerated in: Roman Catholic Church
- Beatified: 27 April 2003, Saint Peter's Square, Vatican City by Pope John Paul II
- Canonized: 15 May 2022, Saint Peter's Square, Vatican City by Pope Francis
- Feast: 2 February
- Attributes: Religious habit
- Patronage: Little Sisters of the Holy Family

Maria Domenica Mantovani (12 November 1862 - 2 February 1934) was an Italian Roman Catholic professed religious, and the co-founder of the Little Sisters of the Holy Family; she established them alongside Giuseppe Nascimbeni. As a nun she received the religious name of Maria of the Immaculate.

She was beatified on 27 April 2003 and canonized on 15 May 2022.

== Life ==
Maria Domenica Mantovani was born on 12 November 1862 in Verona, the eldest of four children born to Giovanni Mantovani and Prudenza Zamperini. Her education did not proceed beyond a period, not very long, in which she studied at a local school. She learnt religion from her parents, which contributed to her sense of having a religious vocation.

In her adolescence – in 1877 – her parish priest and spiritual director, Giuseppe Nascimbeni, encouraged her to visit the ill and to teach catechism in the parish. On 8 December 1886, she made a private vow to remain chaste and asked the Blessed Mother to guide her in how best to fulfill her vocation. In 1892, she founded a religious congregation alongside Nascimbeni and became its first superior; she led the order for a total of four decades.

Mantovani and four of her companions made their solemn profession into the congregation on 4 November 1892. The institute later received the papal approval of Pope Pius XI on 3 June 1932.

Mantovani died in 1934 due to complications from influenza. Her remains were transferred on 12 November 1987 to be near the remains of her friend and confidante, Nascimbeni. The countries in which her order now operates include Albania and Brazil.

== Canonization ==
Mantovani's beatification process commenced after – on 27 January 1987 – the Congregation for the Causes of Saints issued a nihil obstat (nothing against) to the cause in a move that accorded Mantovani the posthumous title of Servant of God. The conferral of the title acted as the process's first official stage. The diocesan process opened in 1987 and, after a brief period of collecting evidence on her saintliness, closed in 1988. The C.C.S. validated the process on 25 May 1990 in Rome.

The C.C.S. received the Positio in 1992, allowing them to commence their own investigation into the cause. The consulting theologians approved the contents of the dossier on 24 October 2000, while the C.C.S. approved it on 9 January 2001. On 24 April 2001, Mantovani was proclaimed to be Venerable after Pope John Paul II approved her life of heroic virtue, both cardinal and theological.

John Paul II beatified Mantovani on 27 April 2003, along with five others: James Alberione, a priest and founder of the Pauline Family; Marco d'Aviano, a priest and member of the Order of Friars Minor Capuchin; Eugenia Ravasco, virgin and founder of the Congregations of the Daughters of the Sacred Hearts of Jesus and Mary; Maria Cristina of the Immaculate Conception Brando, founder of the Congregation of the Sisters, Expiatory Victims of Jesus in the Blessed Sacrament; and Giulia Salzano, virgin and founder of the Congregation of the Catechist Sisters of the Sacred Heart. The pope, who called Mantovani a "praiseworthy daughter of the region of Verona" and a "fine example of holiness for every believer" during his homily for the beatification ceremony, said that Mantovani was "inspired by the Holy Family of Nazareth to make herself 'all things to all people', ever attentive to the needs of the 'poor people'."

The second miracle attributed to her – required for her canonization as a saint – was investigated in Bahía Blanca from 16 November 2015 until 10 June 2016; Cardinal Antonio Cañizares Llovera presided over the closing of the diocesan process, alongside the vice-postulator and medical experts. On 27 May 2020, Pope Francis authorized a decree during a meeting with the prefect of the C.C.S., Cardinal Giovanni Angelo Becciu, which approved a miracle, clearing the way for Mantovani to become a saint. It was announced on 9 November 2021 that the canonization for Mantovani and several others would be celebrated on 15 May 2022.

The current postulator assigned to the cause is Giovangiuseppe Califano. The current vice-postulator is Luciana Camella.
