= Holy Family Institute =

The Holy Family Institute is an institute of consecrated life that is aggregated to the Society of St. Paul, and it is composed exclusively of married and widowed Catholics. Members take private vows (in a public, church-regulated ceremony) of poverty, conjugal chastity and obedience and make a promise of fidelity to the Pope. The vows of members of the Holy Family Institute are adapted according to the conditions of the married state and the normal requirements of family life. The Institute was begun in 1960 and received general approval from the Holy See in 1993.

The charism specific to Holy Family Institute members is lifelong spiritual growth through living the example of the "Holy Family of Nazareth: Model, Light, and Source of Grace".

The Holy Family Institute is a part of the Pauline Family, being one of 10 Institutes begun by Blessed James Alberione early in the 20th century. The Pauline Family is dedicated to evangelization through the media, and it carries on constant prayer for good media and in reparation for the misuse of media.

The Holy Family Institute makes families aware of the media and encourages them to take some practical steps to put their awareness to good use:

- encouraging them to moderate their use of media
- inviting them to point out to their children that there are problems
- reminding them that their thoughts, words, actions, prayers and sufferings are linked, by their membership, to the work of the Pauline Family.
