= Giulia Salzano =

Italian Roman Catholic professed religious

Saint Giulia Salzano
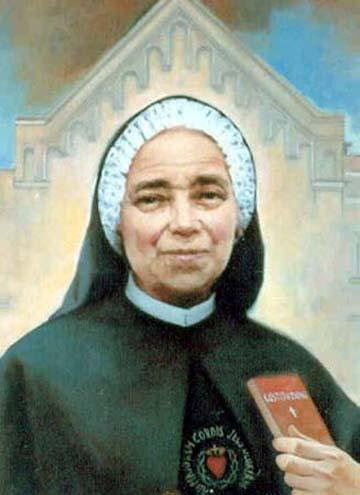

Religious
- Born: 13 October 1846; Santa Maria Capua Vetere, Province of Caserta, Kingdom of the Two Sicilies
- Died: 17 May 1929 (aged 82); Casoria, Naples, Kingdom of Italy
- Venerated in: Roman Catholic Church
- Beatified: 27 April 2003, Saint Peter's Square, Vatican City by Pope John Paul II
- Canonized: 17 October 2010, Saint Peter's Square, Vatican City by Pope Benedict XVI
- Feast: 17 May
- Attributes: Religious habit; Heart
- Patronage: Catechetical Sisters of the Sacred Heart of Jesus

Giulia Salzano (13 October 1846 – 17 May 1929) was an Italian Roman Catholic professed religious and the founder of the Catechetical Sisters of the Sacred Heart of Jesus (1905). Salzano served as a teacher prior to becoming a religious and since 1865 worked in Casoria as a teacher for children where she demonstrated herself as an apt catechist and instructor.

Salzano's cause for sainthood opened on 4 April 1974 under Pope Paul VI and was titled as a Servant of God while Pope John Paul II titled her as Venerable on 23 April 2002 and beatified her as well on 27 April 2003. Pope Benedict XVI canonized her as a saint in Saint Peter's Square on 17 October 2010.

== Life ==
Giulia Salzano was born in Santa Maria Capua Vetere in Caserta on 13 October 1846 as the fourth of seven children to Diego Salzano and Adelaide Valentino; she was baptized that same day. Her mother was a descendant of Alphonsus Maria de' Liguori. Her father – a captain in the Lancers of King Ferdinand II – died in 1850 and her mother could not afford to raise all her children so sent Salzano to an orphanage.

The Sisters of Charity educated and raised her at the orphanage of Santa Maria delle Grazie in San Nicola la Strada from November 1850 when she was admitted into it until 1861 when she returned home. Salzano made her First Communion on 8 December 1854 and received her Confirmation in 1860. Sometime around this point she made a private vow to God to remain chaste. She graduated in Caserta where she received a teaching diploma in 1865 while her first assignment was not too long after this that October. Salzano served as a school teacher and as a catechist in Casoria and became known for being an apt catechist and religious educator. She was also a close friend and co-worker with Caterina Volpicelli and she came into contact with her at the suggestion of the Cardinal Archbishop of Naples Sisto Riario Sforza.

In 1882 she started to entertain the notion of perhaps becoming a nun herself and this intensified as she began to set the foundations for a new religious congregation dedicated to catechesis and education. Two priests from her area offered their input as did Ludovico of Casoria.

On 21 November 1905 she founded the Catechetical Sisters of the Sacred Heart of Jesus and assumed its habit; it received diocesan approval from Cardinal Giuseppe Antonio Ermenegildo Prisco on 12 August 1920 and papal approval from Pope John XXIII on 19 March 1960 (after her death). Salzano became noted for her personal devotion to the Madonna and encouraged others in devotion to her and to the Sacred Heart of Jesus. Her weaknesses later in life would start to hinder her teaching and she began to receive a pension on 19 March 1890 because of this.

Salzano died at dawn on 17 May 1929. The previous morning she had met with 100 children preparing for their First Communion. Her remains were housed in the motherhouse of the order in Casoria at Piazza Giovanni Pisa 20.

== Sainthood ==
The beatification cause commenced in Naples in an informative process – for the collection of documentation and interrogatories – that Cardinal Alessio Ascalesi inaugurated on 29 January 1937 and that Cardinal Marcello Mimmi closed in 1954 while all of her writings received the full approval of a board of theologians who deemed that her spiritual writings were in line with official doctrine. The formal introduction to the cause came under Pope Paul VI on 4 April 1974 in which she was titled as a Servant of God while an apostolic process was later held in April 1977 in Naples under Cardinal Corrado Ursi. The Congregation for the Causes of Saints validated these two processes on 12 July 1991 while receiving the official Positio dossier from the postulation in 1994.

Theologians issued their approval to the cause in a meeting on 29 January 2002 while the C.C.S. themselves likewise issued their approval of it on 5 March 2002. Pope John Paul II declared Salzano to be Venerable on 23 April 2002 after he confirmed that the late nun had lived a model Christian life of heroic virtue. The process for a miracle attributed to her opened in the diocese of its origin and was closed in 1995 before receiving validation in Rome on 11 December 1995; it received the approval of a medical board sometime later on 14 March 2002. The congress of theologians met not too long after on 6 September 2002 and approved this miracle while the C.C.S. issued their approval to it as well on 5 November 2002. This led to John Paul II issuing his final approval for it – and also her beatification – on 20 December 2002 and he later beatified Salzano in Saint Peter's Square on 27 April 2003, along with five others: James Alberione, a priest and founder of the Pauline Family; Marco d'Aviano, a priest and member of the Order of Friars Minor Capuchin; Eugenia Ravasco, virgin and founder of the Congregations of the Daughters of the Sacred Hearts of Jesus and Mary; Maria Domenica Mantovani, virgin and co-founder of the Institute of the Little Sisters of the Holy Family; and Maria Cristina of the Immaculate Conception Brando, founder of the Congregation of the Sisters, Expiatory Victims of Jesus in the Blessed Sacrament. John Paul II called Salzano "in advance of her time" and "an apostle of the new evangelization in which she combined apostolic activity with prayer, offered ceaselessly, especially for the conversion of the 'indifferent'."

The process for the second miracle attributed to her and needed for sainthood spanned from 21 June 2007 until 21 December 2007 at which point all documents were sent in boxes to Rome and later validated on 25 January 2008. The medical board voted in favor of this miracle on 13 November 13, 2008 as did the theologians on 15 September 2009 and the C.C.S. on 1 December 2009. Pope Benedict XVI approved this second miracle on 19 December 2009 and canonized Salzano as a saint of the Roman Catholic Church in Saint Peter's Square on 17 October 2010. The pope addressed the crowds and said: "May the example and intercession of Saint Giulia Salzano sustain the church in her perennial task of announcing Christ and form authentic Christian consciences".
