= Maria Cristina of the Immaculate Conception Brando =

Italian Roman Catholic saint

Saint Maria Cristina of the Immaculate Conception Brando S.V.E.G.S.
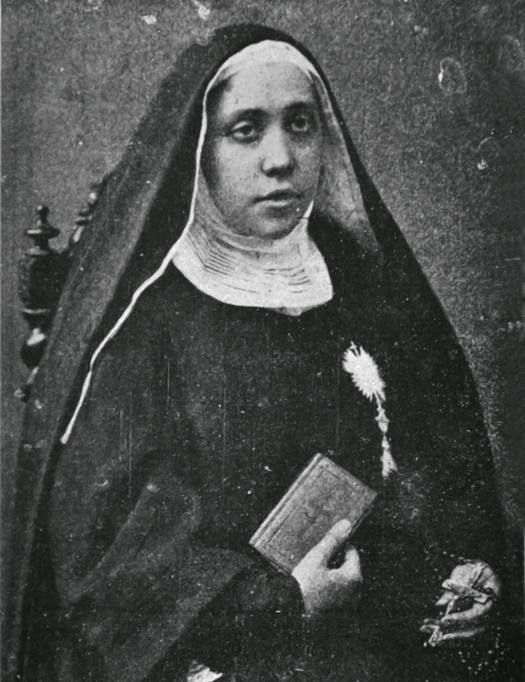
- Born: 1 May 1856; Naples, Campania, Kingdom of the Two Sicilies
- Died: 20 January 1906 (aged 49); Casoria, Province of Naples, Kingdom of Italy
- Resting place: Casoria, Naples, Italy
- Venerated in: Roman Catholic Church (Archdiocese of Naples & Sisters, Expiatory Victims of Jesus in the Blessed Sacrament)
- Beatified: 27 April 2003, Saint Peter's Square, Vatican City by Pope John Paul II
- Canonized: 17 May 2015, Saint Peter's Square, Vatican City by Pope Francis
- Feast: 20 January
- Attributes: Religious habit
- Patronage: Sisters, Expiatory Victims of Jesus in the Blessed Sacrament

Maria Cristina of the Immaculate Conception Brando (1 May 1856 – 20 January 1906), born Adelaida Brando, was an Italian saint, nun and the founder of the Congregation of the Sisters, Expiatory Victims of Jesus in the Blessed Sacrament, an international teaching institute. She was beatified by Pope John Paul II on 27 April 2003, and canonized by Pope Francis on 17 May 2015.

== Life ==
Adelaida Brando was born on 1 May 1856 in Naples, Italy, the youngest of four sisters, to Christian and wealthy parents Giovanni Giuseppe and Maria Concetta Marrazzo, who died several days after Brando's birth. Brando received a "fruiful and sound" religious education and showed inclinations towards the religious life, holiness, prayer, and celibacy early in her life. As a child, she would say, "I must be a saint, I want to be a saint". When she was about 12 years old, she professed a vow of perpetual chastity before an image of the Christ child. She tried to enter the convent of the Sacramentine nuns in Naples, but her father prevented her. He gave his permission for her to join the Poor Clare nuns at their convent in Fiorentine, where her oldest sister was a nun, but Brando became ill and had to return to her family for medical care. After she recovered, she was able to enter the Sacramentine's convent; in 1876, she became a nun, taking on the name Maria Cristina of the Immaculate Conception. She became ill again and had to return home.

In 1878, Brando founded the Congregation of the Sisters, Expiatory Victims of Jesus in the Blessed Sacrament while renting a room with the Teresiane Sisters of Torre del Greco. The new congregation grew quickly, despite economic limitations and Brando's health difficulties. The community settled in Casoria, three miles northeast of Naples, grew with new houses and members, and "demonstrated great devotion to the Eucharist and diligent care for the education of young boys and girls". The congregation founded collegiate schools for girls, orphanages, and boarding and day schools. On 20 July 1903, the congregation received approval from the pope, with Brando as their superior general, and on 2 November, Brando and many other nuns professed perpetual vows. According to her biography published on the Vatican News website, "She lived her consecration with generosity, with perseverance and with spiritual joy" and "held the office of superior general with humility, prudence and amiability, giving her sisters continual examples of fidelity to God and to one's vocation and of zeal for the growth of the kingdom of God".

Brando built a cell near the church of the convent where she lived, which she called the grotticella ("the little grotto"), in order to "be nearer in spirit and in body to the tabernacle". She slept there in a chair every night, in order to "accompany Jesus in the Eucharist, while awake and while resting". She celebrated the sacraments regularly and practiced devotion to the Incarnation, to the Passion and death of Christ, and to the Eucharist. Brando died on 20 January 1906.

== Legacy ==
Brando's cause was formally opened on 15 April 1943, granting her the title of Servant of God. Brando was beatified by Pope John Paul II on 27 April 2003, along with five others: James Alberione, a priest and founder of the Pauline Family; Marco d'Aviano, a priest and member of the Order of Friars Minor Capuchin; Eugenia Ravasco, virgin and founder of the Congregations of the Daughters of the Sacred Hearts of Jesus and Mary; Maria Domenica Mantovani, virgin and co-founder of the Institute of the Little Sisters of the Holy Family; and Giulia Salzano, virgin and founder of the Congregation of the Catechist Sisters of the Sacred Heart. The pope stated about Brando during his homily for the beatification ceremony: "All that God worked through Maria Christina Brando is astonishing. Her Eucharistic and expiatory spirituality is expressed in two lines, like 'two branches that stem from the same trunk': love of God and love of neighbour. Her desire to take part in Christ's passion, as it were, 'overflowed' into educational works, for the purpose of making people aware of their dignity and open to the Lord's merciful love".

She was canonized by Pope Francis on 17 May 2015, along with three other 19th century nuns and educators: Marie-Alphonsine and Mary of Jesus Crucified of Palestine, and Émilie de Villeneuve from France. During the ceremony, Francis said this about Brando: "She was completely given over to ardent love for the Lord. From prayer and her intimate encounter with the risen Jesus present in the Eucharist, she received strength to endure suffering and to give herself, as bread which is broken, to many people who had wandered far from God and yet hungered for authentic love".

== Works cited ==
- Burns, Paul (2005). Butler's Saints of the Third Millennium. London: Bloomsbury Academic. ISBN 9780860123828.
