= Sisters of the Little Way =

Catholic religious order for women

- Sisters of the Little Way of Beauty, Truth and Goodness
- Formation: 2023; 3 years ago
- Founded at: Portland, Oregon, US
- Type: Religious order
- Legal status: Private association of the Christian faithful
- Headquarters: Lexington, Kentucky
- Members: 2 (2026)
- Website: sistersofthelittleway.com

The Sisters of the Little Way of Beauty, Truth, and Goodness are a private association of the Christian faithful of Catholic religious sisters who have a mission of listening and solidarity with those on the fringes of the Church, especially those hurt by members of the Catholic Church.

== History ==
Theresa Aletheia Noble and Danielle Victoria Lussier were both religious sisters in the Daughters of St. Paul. In 2022, they stepped away from the Daughters of Saint Paul to request approval from a diocesan bishop to begin a religious community.

Seeing Archbishop Alexander Sample's response to the 2018 grand jury investigation of Catholic Church sexual abuse in Pennsylvania wherein he mentioned need for "justice... compassion, assistance, and encouragement" for victims of abuse, the sisters chose to form their community in the Archdiocese of Portland in Oregon. Noble and Lussier and another woman, Maria Kim-Ngân Bùi, took private vows before Sample on September 22, 2023. Several months later, Bùi would discern a different path and leave the community.

In March 2025, after completing degrees in abuse prevention at the Pontifical Gregorian University in Rome, the Sisters relocated to the Diocese of Lexington in Kentucky where they now reside.

== Outreach ==
The Sisters' mission is "listening and solidarity with people on the fringes of the Church, especially those who have been wounded, scandalized, or abused by members of the Church." The Sisters pray for and meet with those who have experienced abuse within the Catholic Church, whether that abuse is sexual, spiritual, financial, or emotional. Some of the Sisters' ministry takes place online through meeting with survivors of abuse. They are the only religious sisters in the Catholic Church whose mission is explicitly dedicated to safeguarding, accompanying survivors, and educating about the dynamics of abuse in religious contexts.

The Sisters published a limited series podcast entitled Descent Into Light where they work through how to recognize unhealthy patterns of spiritual and sexual grooming and abuse of adults, discuss institutional and cultural roadblocks to overcoming abuse and finding healing, and speak with professionals on the topic. The sisters share their own story of grooming and abuse by a priest whom their former community brought in to be a spiritual director as the structure within which they share about the reality of adult abuse in the Church. In its first week, the podcast was in the top 10% of podcast listenership; four months later, it remained in the top 25%. Sara Larson, director of Awake, and Hans Zollner, former member of the Pontifical Commission for the Protection of Minors, appeared on the podcast.

== Organization ==
Canonically, within the Catholic Church the community is structured a private association of the Christian faithful on the path towards full recognition as a religious institute. The process is more complex since changes by Pope Francis in 2022, made in part to help avoid abuse in religious communities.

In addition to praying the Liturgy of the Hours, each morning the sisters pray the Prayer to Saint Michael, Memorare, and Litany of the Precious Blood. On Fridays, the sisters offer fasting and prayer for all survivors of clerical abuse in a practice they call Lacrimosa.

The colors of their habit are black to symbolize memento mori, gray to symbolizes ashes and penitence, and teal to represent the Mary's intercession for anawim (Hebrew: "little ones").

In 2026, the Sisters of the Little Way stated they had "received a lot of interest" from women seeking to join the community, and hoped to be able to accept new members by 2027. In July 2026, they expected to meet with potential members that summer.
