= Émilie de Villeneuve =

French Roman Catholic saint

Saint Émilie de Villeneuve
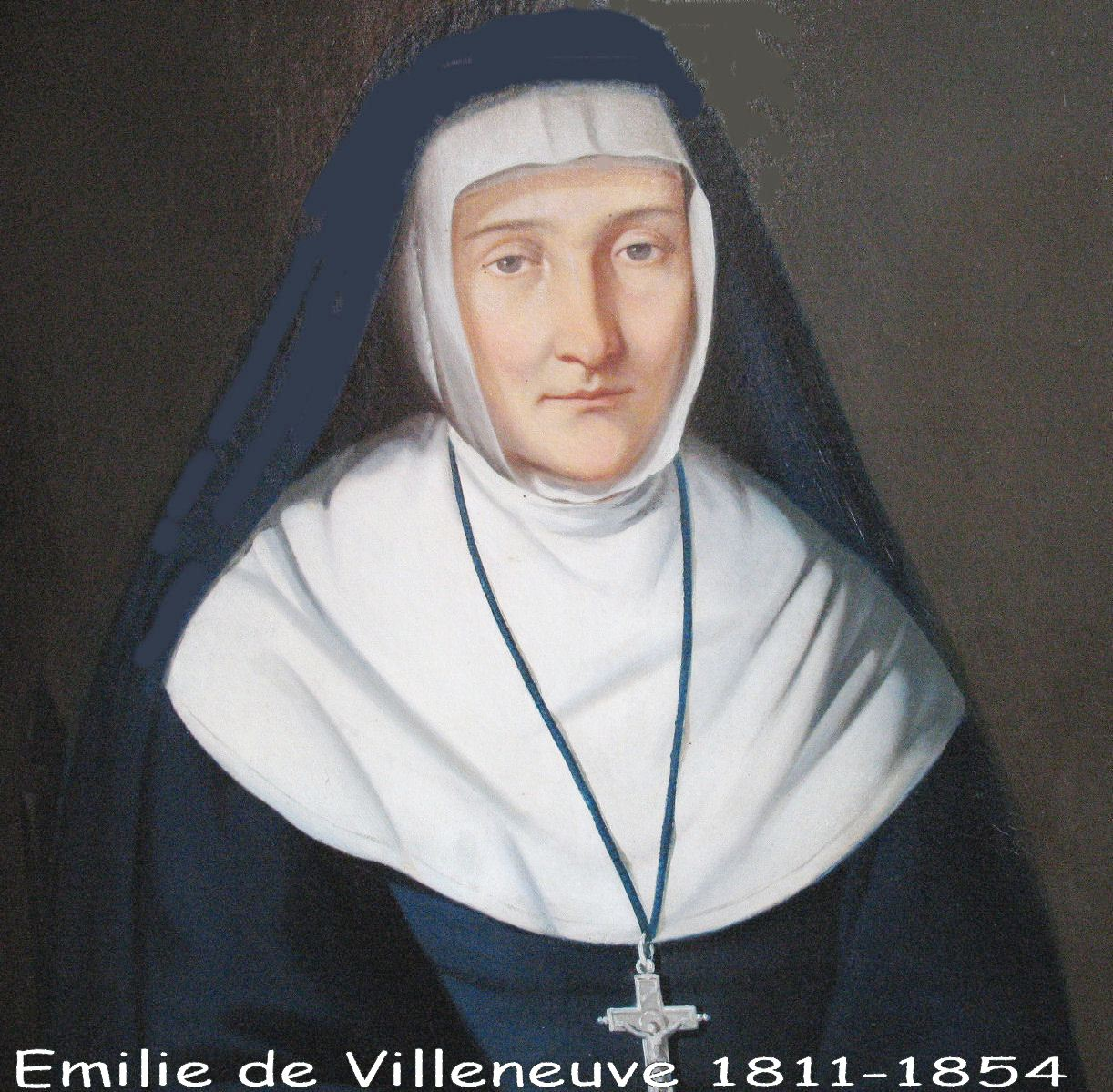

Religious
- Born: 9 March 1811; Toulouse, Haute-Garonne, First French Empire
- Died: 2 October 1854 (aged 43); Castres, Tarn, Second French Empire
- Venerated in: Catholic Church
- Beatified: 5 July 2009, Castres, France by Cardinal Angelo Amato
- Canonized: 17 May 2015, Saint Peter's Square, Vatican City by Pope Francis
- Feast: 2 October
- Attributes: Religious habit
- Patronage: Our Lady of the Immaculate Conception of Castres

Émilie de Villeneuve (9 March 1811 – 2 October 1854) was a French Catholic nun and the founder of the Sisters of Our Lady of the Immaculate Conception of Castres.

After she died her cause of canonization was opened. She was beatified in 2009 after a miracle attributed to her intercession was ratified. She was approved for sainthood in 2014 and was canonized by Pope Francis on 17 May 2015.

== Biography ==
=== Early life ===
Jeanne-Emilie de Villeneuve, also named Émilie de Villeneuve, was born in Toulouse, on 9 March 1811 From an early age, she lived in Hauterive Castle (near Castres), where her sick mother had withdrawn for treatment. She lost her mother at the age of 14 in 1815, followed by her sister Octavie in 1818.

After her mother's death, she lived some time in Toulouse where her grandmother supported her education and that of her sisters. At the age 19, de Villeneuve was back at Hauterive, where she managed family life, mitigating of this task her father, then mayor of Castres (from 1826 to 1830). She planned to join the "Daughters of Charity". But during the cooling off period imposed by her father, she created (with the approval of her bishop), and in collaboration with two companions, the Congregation of Our Lady of the Immaculate Conception on 8 December 1836. The religious community rapidly became known under the name of "Blue sisters of Castres" because of the color of their clothes.

In the anonymity of a house in Castres, with her companions, she served the poor: young workers, sick people, prostitutes and those who were convicted in prison. Then, the congregation saw the growing number of its sisters, and its influence extended to Africa (Senegal, Gambia, and Gabon).

=== The charism of Émilie ===
De Villeneuve called on others to become missionaries wherever they were, daring to take a stand for justice, peace, respect and attention to the smallest in all our places of life, to do all this out of love, according to the motto taken by the congregation: "to go where the voice of the poor calls us". This charism explained the scope and diversity of the competences displayed by the community members: education, health and participation in the life of local church.

=== Funding and development of the congregation ===
De Villeneuve founded the Congregation of the Sisters of Our Lady of the Immaculate Conception on 8 December 1836. Constitutions were approved in 1842 (revised in 2004). Twelve years after the establishment of the congregation, it started to expand in Africa in 1848, then in Europe in 1903, in Latin America in 1904–1905, and eventually in the Asia Pacific region in 1998.

Today, there are around 600 members spread in 124 communities in 18 countries: France, Spain, Italy, Senegal, Burkina Faso, Benin, Gabon, RD Congo, Brazil, Argentina, Uruguay, Paraguay, Bolivia, Venezuela, Mexico, Haiti and in the Philippines.

== The beatification process ==
During the Generalate of Mother Sylvie Azaïs, Superioress General from 1921 to 1936, the congregation began to copy and classify handwritten documents, in order to deepen the knowledge of the spirituality of Villeneuve. It was in 1945, that Superior General Mother Marie Agathe Vernadat (1936-1947) began studying the writings of the late founder for the cause of canonization.

On 18 August 1947, during the General Chapter, Superior General Mother Germaine Sapene communicated the decision of the council to introduce in Rome the cause of Villeneuve.

The process began on 25 August 1948 under the chairmanship of the Archbishop of Albi, Jean-Joseph-Aimé Moussaron. As the cause was launched 94 years after the death of the newly proclaimed Servant of God, it was considered "historical cause". The opening of the diocesan process was held on 25 August 1948. The exhumation of the body of de Villeneuve took place on 20 November 1948. The re-burial of her bones was conducted on 18 August 1949. The diocesan process ended in February 1950, and in March 1950, the process was transferred to Rome. There it was officially opened on 14 April 1950.

The Positio on the heroic Christian virtues was approved on 10 October 1984. On 6 July 1991, there came the "reading of the decree of the heroism of the virtues" in front of Pope John Paul II, who authorized the promulgation, which became official on 9 October 1991.

=== The first miracle (1995) ===
In February 1995, Binta Diaby, a young girl from the Republic of Guinea hospitalized in Barcelona, Spain, was cured of acute peritonitis after the blue sisters of a neighboring community visited the young woman and after the novena that they did for the intention of Binta.

Doctors have recognized the healing and Binta Diaby and the folder was sent to Bishop Ricard María Carles y Gordò, Bishop of Barcelona, on 27 March 2003. The diocesan tribunal began on 16 May 2003 and was concluded on 29 October 2003. The information from that process were brought to Rome on 31 October 2003 and 4 February 2004, the Congregation for the Causes of Saints promulgated a decree of validity.

It would go to the Medical Board and a vote was held for the miracle, completed on February 16, 2006 in which the members recognized unanimously that medicine could not explain the cure in question. This has been recognized by the theologians and later the cardinals and bishops of the congregation.

=== Beatification ===
The decree on the miracle was promulgated by the Congregation for the Causes of Saints on 17 December 2007. Émilie de Villeneuve was beatified by Cardinal Angelo Amato, Prefect of the Congregation for the Causes of Saints, during a ceremony in Castres on 5 July 2009. This was done on behalf of Pope Benedict XVI.

== Canonization process ==
=== The second miracle ===
For the canonization of Émilie de Villeneuve, the postulator of the cause presented the case of healing of a child named Emilly, born 2 August 2007 at Oroco, Pernambuco, in Brazil. On 5 May 2008 - Emilly was barely nine months old - she was playing with the wire of an electric fan. She put her finger in the power outlet and received an electric shock. Eight minutes later, she was found paralyzed and moaning.

Emilly was unconscious without pulsation or respiration: she went into cardiopulmonary arrest. The doctor who visited her said, "Your daughter is dead, what can I do?" Her father begged the doctor: "She is not dead! Do whatever you can!" The doctor on duty, Dr. Jairo de Lima Ferreira, tried to resuscitate the child. Usually doctors do it for 20 minutes. For Emilly, he tried for an hour. When the heart started to give the first sign of life, he took the ambulance and took her to the hospital Dom Malan.

She stayed there for 10 days and then 6 days in the pediatrics section. The doctor who accompanied her said to the family: "If Emilly gets out of here alive, she will not be able to neither see, nor hear nor speak, and even less walk". She left the hospital on 20 May and could not see or speak.

From 21 to 29 May 2008, a novena was said to Émilie de Villeneuve. On the evening of 30 May 2008, there was a radical change: the girl began to see and returned to normal. Emilly, from that day, began to develop as a normal child, with the characteristics of her age. Successive medical examinations, until the last made by the two experts "ab inspectione", had recorded the absence of neurological consequences.

The initiative to invoke Villeneuve's intercession came from Ana Celia de Oliveira, a religious sister of the Congregation of Our Lady of the Immaculate Conception, who knew Emilly's grandfather Rafael, and his family. When de Oliveira received the news of the accident at the Mr. Rafael's granddaughter, she began to invoke the intercession of Villeneuve in front of a relic. This image was provided to the family of the child, who began to pray, asking for the intercession of Villeneuve and the image with the relic was placed under the head of the child.

This happened after the promulgation of the decree on the heroic virtues in 2007 but before the beatification ceremony. A papal indult was given to be able to follow the diocesan research into the miracle. The recognition of the miracle took place from 13 September 2011 to 12 June 2012. The diocesan tribunal was constituted on 13 September 2012 in Petrolina City.

The Medical Board conducted a vote on 6 March 2014, Experts unanimously voted on the diagnosis "prolonged respiratory cardiac arrest after the electric shock" and they considered especially the absence of neurological consequences that science cannot explain. On 25 September 2014 the theological advisors met and considered the child's recovery as a miracle through the intercession of Émilie de Villeneuve.

== Canonization ==
The second miracle was confirmed to have been performed through her intercession on 6 December 2014. Pope Francis declared that she would be canonized as a result of this and announced at a consistory on 14 February 2015 that the late nun shall be canonized on 17 May 2015. She was canonized on that date at the Vatican, along with three other 19th century nuns and educators: Saint Marie-Alphonsine and Saint Mary of Jesus Crucified of Palestine, and Maria Cristina of the Immaculate Conception Brando from Italy. Francis stated during his homily of the ceremony this about de Villeneuve: "...Love shines forth in the testimony of Sister Jeanne Émilie de Villeneuve, who consecrated her life to God and to the poor, the sick, the imprisoned and the exploited, becoming for them and for all a concrete sign of the Lord’s merciful love".
