= Aviano railway station =

Railway station in Italy

Aviano
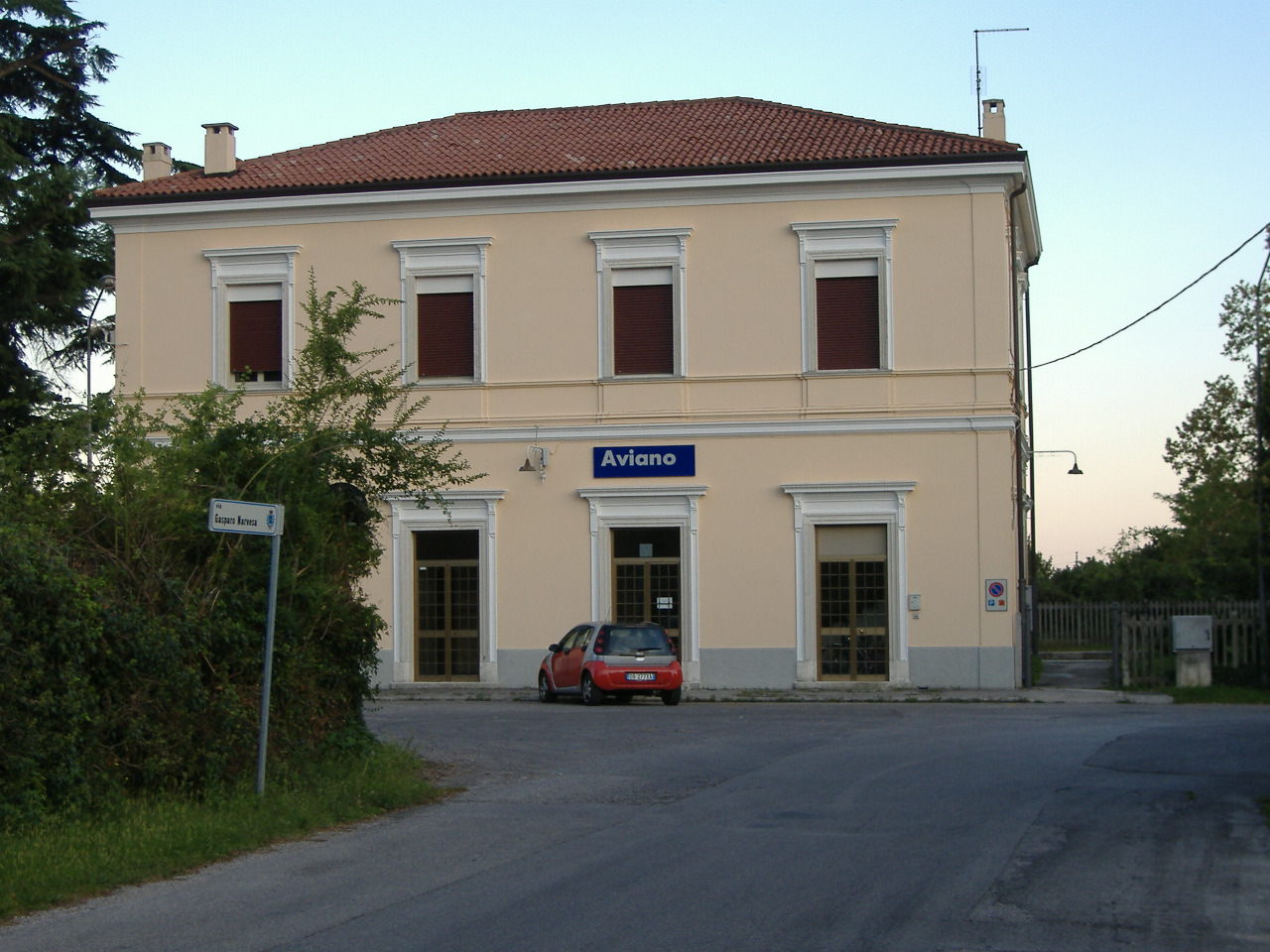
- View of the station building.

General information
- Location: Piazzale Stazione 2 Aviano (PN); Aviano, Pordenone, Friuli-Venezia Giulia; Italy
- Coordinates: 46°03′52″N 12°35′26″E
- Owner: Rete Ferroviaria Italiana
- Operator: Rete Ferroviaria Italiana
- Line: Sacile-Pinzano-Gemona del Friuli
- Platforms: 3
- Train operators: Trenitalia
- Connections: Suburban buses

Other information
- Status: In Use

History
- Opened: October 28, 1930; 95 years ago
Location
- Location within Friuli-Venezia Giulia Location within Northern Italy Location within Italy

Aviano railway station (Italian: Stazione di Aviano) is a railway station serving the city of Aviano, Italy.

== History ==
The station was inaugurated on October 28, 1930, when it opened the railway line between Sacile and Pinzano al Tagliamento.

== Structure and systems ==
The passenger building consists of two levels. The building is brick and is painted pink. There is a cargo terminal with attached warehouse in the station. As of 2010, the cargo terminal had been largely dismantled while the warehouse had been converted to storage. The architecture of the warehouse is very similar to that of other Italian railway stations. The layout of the buildings is rectangular. The square is composed of two tracks. Specifically, Track 1 is used for crossing and precedence between trains (on route diverted). Track 2 is the running line. Both tracks have platforms connected by a crossing at grade.

== Closure and Reopening ==
On 6 July 2012, following a landslide in Meduno which damaged the train tracks and caused regional train Minuetto (6046) to derail, rail traffic was halted. The rail service was promptly replaced with a bus service, which made 4 trips daily between Sacile and Maniago.

In response to the closure, the "Trains-Taglia Give Us Back Our Train" (Italian: Treni-Taglia ridacci il nostro treno) relay was born. The relay began by parading a banner down the entire railway over the course of a month from Gemona to Sacile, and was displayed at all municipal offices. This motto reached as far as Sicily, where the Alto Friuli Commuters Committee met with engineer Luigi Cantamessa, the director of the FS Foundation (Italian: Fondazione FS Italiane). The committee embraced his "Timeless Tracks" (Italian: Binari senza tempo) project, which envisioned the repurposing of 18 Italian railway lines for tourism.

In December 2014, the Friuli-Venezia Giulia regional government signed an agreement with local mountain-community authorities and the Udine–Cividale railway to commission a feasibility study, which was presented to municipalities in January 2016. Rete Ferroviaria Italiana (RFI) was chosen to carry out track repairs at Meduno. The project was subsequently approved on August 2, 2017 by the Senate.

On 20 April 2017, it was announced that RFI has restored a section of the track on the line in Meduno.

The service was partially opened to the public on 10–11 December 2017, restoring the connection between Sacile and Maniago, though the remaining stretch toward Pinzano al Tagliamento and Gemona del Friuli has stayed suspended. The restored line is the first in Italy to combine both tourist services and local public transport.
