= Awake (organization) =

American non-profit organization

- Formation: 2019; 7 years ago
- Founder: Sara Larson
- Founded at: Milwaukee, Wisconsin, United States
- Type: Nonprofit
- Tax ID no.: 84-4590798
- Revenue: $173,936 (2025)
- Expenses: $175,950 (2025)
- Website: awakecommunity.org
- Formerly called: Awake Milwaukee

Awake, formerly Awake Milwaukee, is a non-profit dedicated to listening, educating, healing, and advocacy surrounding Catholic Church sexual abuse cases.

== History ==
Following grand jury investigation of Catholic Church sexual abuse in Pennsylvania and resignation of Theodore Cardinal McCarrick in the summer of 2018, Milwaukee-area Catholic Sara Larson, a practicing Catholic who had worked in a parish and served on her parish council, resigned from her parish job and began blogging about her concern, anger, and sadness. Larson had previously thought the abuse was in the past and had been fixed but began to rethink her approach. After connecting with other Milwaukee Catholics experiencing similar feelings, they began to meet in her home and gradually became to call themselves Awake Milwaukee. In August 2019, the group was formally established; its first public act was to issue an apology to victims of sexual abuse.

During the COVID-19 pandemic, its support groups were forced to become virtual and as a result expanded across the country; in response, the group renamed themselves from Awake Milwaukee to simply Awake. Awake named Charles Lwanga, Catherine of Siena, Mary and Abraham of Edessa, Michael the Archangel, and Our Lady, Undoer of Knots as their patrons in 2023.

== Outreach ==
The group hosts support groups, called Survivor Circles, for survivors of clerical abuse, with members from across the United States and Canada. Awake welcomes people from all backgrounds and relationships with the Catholic Church; in 2022, it launched a Circle with no prayer or religious elements whatsoever. Larson states that Circles help survivors find community, and allow survivors space to share the stories of their abuse, sometimes for the first time. Awake also hosts Bridges Dialogues, where survivors share their experiences with listening, non-offending church leaders. Awake also hosts a virtual Way of the Cross with meditations written by survivors. They also occasionally offer in-person retreats.

In 2023, Awake hosted a conversation with Fr. Hans Zollner, a Jesuit priest and at the time a member of the Pontifical Commission for the Protection of Minors, where he criticized the Vos estis lux mundi reforms issued by Pope Francis as being "unhelpful" and acknowledged that the new rules were "very often... not working".

== See also ==
- Sisters of the Little Way
