= Aviano =

Aviano Pleif (Cimbrian)
- Comune
- Comune di Aviano
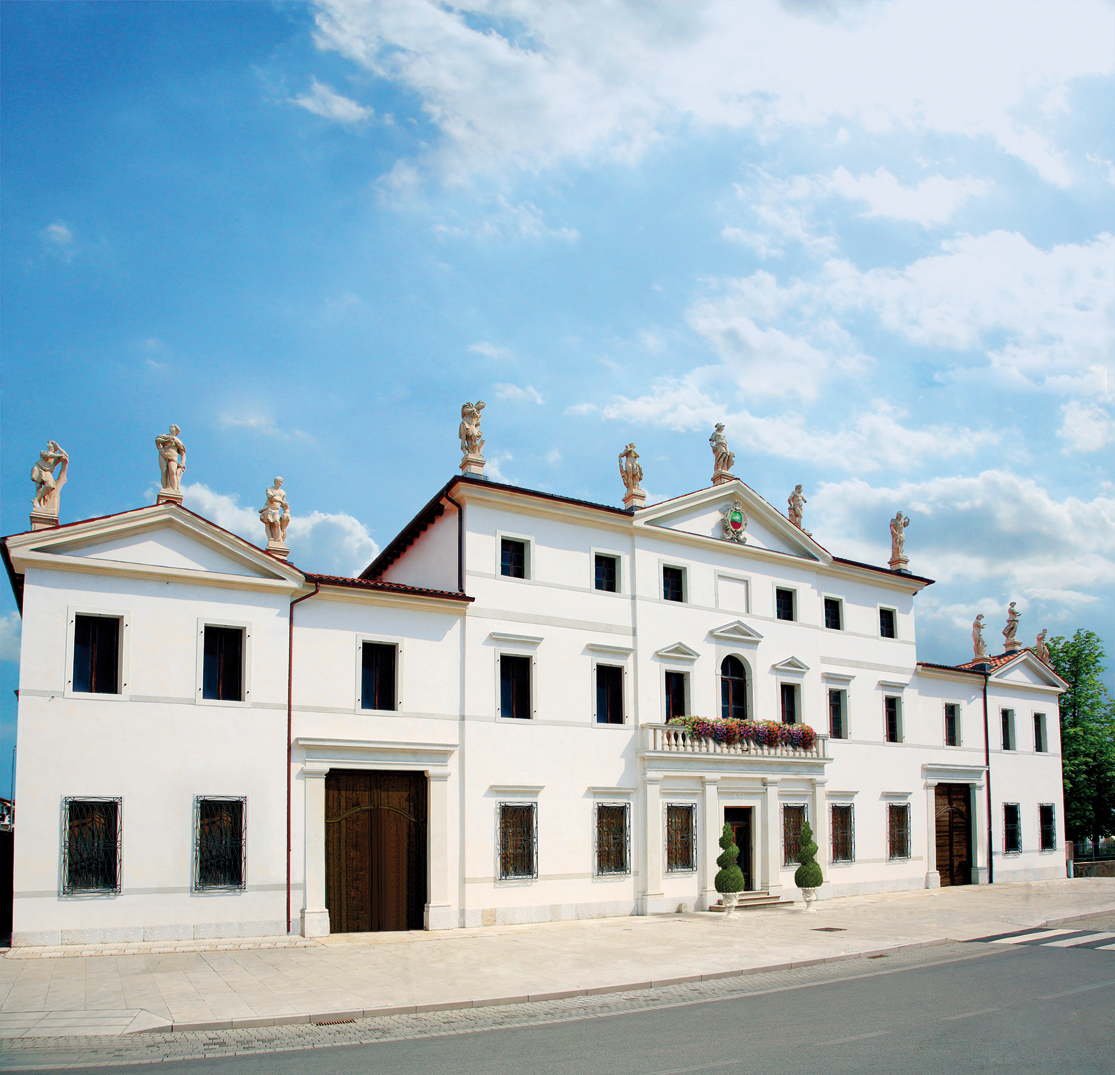
- Palazzo Menegozzi in Piazza Duomo

- Location within Italy Location within Friuli-Venezia Giulia
- Coordinates: 46°04′N 12°35′E
- Country: Italy
- Region: Friuli-Venezia Giulia
- Province: Pordenone (PN)
- Frazioni: Castello di Aviano, Giais, Cortina di Giais, Selva di Giais, Costa, Glera, Marsure, Ornedo, Piancavallo, Piante, San Martino di Campagna, Somprado

Government
  - Mayor: Paolo Tassan-Zanin (elected in 2022)

Area
  - Total: 113.35 km^{2} (43.76 sq mi)
- Elevation: 159 m (522 ft)

Population (31 December 2017)
  - Total: 9,080
  - Density: 80.1/km^{2} (207/sq mi)
- Demonym: Avianesi
- Time zone: UTC+1 (CET)
  - Summer (DST): UTC+2 (CEST)
- Postal code: 33081
- Dialing code: 0434
- ISTAT code: 093004
- Patron saint: St. Zeno
- Website: Official website

Aviano (Friulian: Davian; Cimbrian: Pleif) is a town and comune (municipality) in the Regional decentralization entity of Pordenone at the foot of the Dolomites mountain range in Friuli-Venezia Giulia, northeast Italy.

Aviano is home to the C.R.O. (Centro di Riferimento Oncologico), one of the main Italian cancer hospitals and research centres.

The Piancavallo ski resort is part of the municipality.

== History ==
Findings from Aviano show that the area has been populated since the Bronze Age.

It became an agricultural area dependent on the municipality of Concordia Sagittaria. The name itself, Aviano, derives from a prediale name, that is, referring to land belonging to a landowner named Avilius or Avidius.

In the early Middle Ages Aviano was made up of parish churches and villages in correspondence with today's hamlets. Around the 11th century, on a hill overlooking the surrounding plain, a castle was built by the Patriarchate of Aquileia and given to local feudal lords. The castle was besieged several times, during the 14th century first by the Da Camino and then by the Carraresi, and in 1411 it was conquered by the Hungarian troops of Emperor Sigismund.

Most historians believe that a commercial center developed where present day Aviano is situated, with a cultural and defensive center in the castle area. Aviano was a possession of the Patriarchal State of Friuli until 1420, when it came under the influence of the Venetian Republic, like the rest of the territory of the Patriarchate of Aquileia. In 1477 and 1499 Aviano and the surrounding villages were devastated by raids of Ottoman troops in which a large part of the population was killed or taken prisoner.

In the town in 1631 was born Blessed Marco d'Aviano, who was the spiritual guide of Catholics during the siege of Vienna in 1683 and in the subsequent period of reconquest by the Holy League of the Christian territories that had been occupied by the troops of the Ottoman Empire.

With the fall of the Venetian Republic, Aviano followed the fate of the rest of Friuli and Veneto, and was part of the Napoleonic Empire and then the Austrian Empire (Kingdom of Lombardy-Venetia ) before being annexed to the Kingdom of Italy in 1866 as a consequence of the Third War of Italian Independence, itself a part of the Prussian-Austrian War.

In 1911 one of the first airfields of the Italian Air Force was built in Aviano, which in the following years was enlarged and became increasingly important until it became the NATO Aviano AB base in the 1950s. At the end of the sixties the mountain area of Piancavallo became a ski and winter sports resort.

== Geography ==
Although the village is located at the foot of the Dolomites, the municipality extends to an altitude of 2,251 metres (7,385 feet) above sea level (Cimon del Cavallo peak).

=== Climate ===
Climate data for Aviano (normals and extremes 2000-2024)
Month	Jan	Feb	Mar	Apr	May	Jun	Jul	Aug	Sep	Oct	Nov	Dec	Year
Record high °C (°F)	17.0 (62.6)	23.6 (74.5)	24.8 (76.6)	28.6 (83.5)	33.2 (91.8)	36.4 (97.5)	37.6 (99.7)	37.0 (98.6)	34.8 (94.6)	28.8 (83.8)	26.0 (78.8)	20.2 (68.4)	37.6 (99.7)
Mean daily maximum °C (°F)	7.3 (45.1)	9.7 (49.5)	13.7 (56.7)	17.9 (64.2)	22.0 (71.6)	26.8 (80.2)	28.8 (83.8)	28.5 (83.3)	23.7 (74.7)	18.7 (65.7)	13.1 (55.6)	8.9 (48.0)	18.3 (64.9)
Daily mean °C (°F)	3.8 (38.8)	5.9 (42.6)	9.3 (48.7)	13.2 (55.8)	17.5 (63.5)	22.1 (71.8)	23.9 (75.0)	23.6 (74.5)	19.2 (66.6)	14.7 (58.5)	9.1 (48.4)	5.3 (41.5)	14.0 (57.1)
Mean daily minimum °C (°F)	0.3 (32.5)	2.2 (36.0)	4.8 (40.6)	8.5 (47.3)	13.1 (55.6)	17.4 (63.3)	19.0 (66.2)	18.7 (65.7)	14.6 (58.3)	10.6 (51.1)	6.4 (43.5)	1.6 (34.9)	9.8 (49.6)
Record low °C (°F)	−9.4 (15.1)	−9.0 (15.8)	−9.2 (15.4)	−4.8 (23.4)	4.8 (40.6)	5.2 (41.4)	10.0 (50.0)	0.0 (32.0)	5.8 (42.4)	−1.4 (29.5)	−4.0 (24.8)	−9.2 (15.4)	−9.4 (15.1)
Average precipitation mm (inches)	49.1 (1.93)	61.5 (2.42)	61.5 (2.42)	87.1 (3.43)	104.7 (4.12)	78.7 (3.10)	116.3 (4.58)	83.7 (3.30)	99.0 (3.90)	100.1 (3.94)	117.9 (4.64)	53.1 (2.09)	1,012.7 (39.87)
Average precipitation days (≥ 0.1 mm)	5.1	6.1	7.2	9.2	12.1	9.6	9.7	8.2	8.3	8.5	8.6	5.9	98.5
Average snowy days	0.7	0.4	0.3	0.1	0	0	0	0	0	0	0.2	0.5	2.2
Source: Meteomanz

Climate data for Aviano (1981-2010)
Month	Jan	Feb	Mar	Apr	May	Jun	Jul	Aug	Sep	Oct	Nov	Dec	Year
Mean daily maximum °C (°F)	7.4 (45.3)	8.9 (48.0)	13.0 (55.4)	17.1 (62.8)	22.1 (71.8)	25.6 (78.1)	28.3 (82.9)	28.3 (82.9)	23.7 (74.7)	18.4 (65.1)	12.5 (54.5)	8.3 (46.9)	17.8 (64.0)
Daily mean °C (°F)	3.5 (38.3)	4.6 (40.3)	8.6 (47.5)	12.8 (55.0)	17.7 (63.9)	21.2 (70.2)	23.6 (74.5)	23.5 (74.3)	19.1 (66.4)	14.3 (57.7)	8.7 (47.7)	4.6 (40.3)	13.5 (56.3)
Mean daily minimum °C (°F)	−0.3 (31.5)	0.2 (32.4)	4.2 (39.6)	8.4 (47.1)	13.3 (55.9)	16.7 (62.1)	18.9 (66.0)	18.6 (65.5)	14.5 (58.1)	10.2 (50.4)	4.8 (40.6)	0.8 (33.4)	9.2 (48.6)
Average rainfall mm (inches)	25.9 (1.02)	21.6 (0.85)	32.8 (1.29)	44.4 (1.75)	69.0 (2.72)	49.1 (1.93)	43.4 (1.71)	49.8 (1.96)	61.5 (2.42)	50.1 (1.97)	65.4 (2.57)	42.9 (1.69)	555.9 (21.88)
Average rainy days (≥ 1.0 mm)	2	2	3	4	5	4	4	4	3	3	3	3	40

== Main sights ==
=== Religious buildings ===
- The Cathedral of San Zenone (Duomo), built between 1775 and 1832. It has paintings from the 16th and 17th centuries, one of which attributed to Paolo Veronese's school.
- The church of St. Gregory, in the frazione of Castello, with a precious fresco cycle of the Passion of Christ (late 16th century).
- Sanctuary of the Madonna del Monte(Madonna of the mountain), built in 1615 on the site of a Marian apparition, was remodeled in the Baroque style.
- Church of Santa Caterina, in the frazione of Marsure, built in the fifteenth century and richly frescoed with scenes from the life of St. Catherine of Alexandria.
- Parish Church of Giais, retains a baroque altarpiece of O. Gortanutti.
- Parish Church of San Martino (frazione of San Martino di Campagna). Guards inside a canvas of Pomponio Amalteo and some wooden works of the seventeenth century.
- Church of San Floriano of the fifteenth century.

=== Secular buildings ===
- The remains of the Castle (first half of the 10th century), on a hill nearby the city, including two towers, the mastio and the walls. The latter include the Renaissance-style church of Santa Maria e Giuliana (1589), which houses a precious stone Pietà sculpture by masters from Salzburg.
- The village has a total of 7 Venetian villas protected by the Regional Institute Venetian Villas (IRVV). The following villas can be visited upon request: Villa Policreti-Fabris with the adjoining frescoed chapel, Villa Bonassi and Villa Zanussi-Fabris. You must then remember the imposing presence of Villa Menegozzi Brazzoduro dating from the mid-eighteenth century (the interior is decorated with landscape views done with tempera technique).

=== Natural places ===
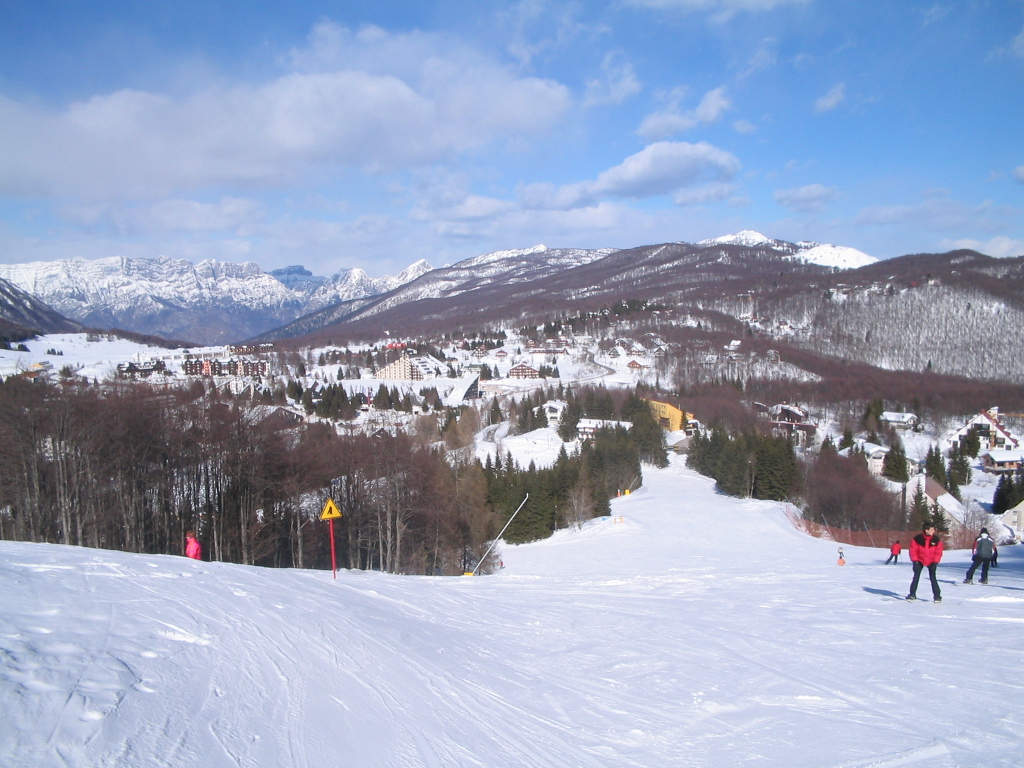
A part of Piancavallo ski resort.

- The ski resort of Piancavallo, elevation 1,267 metres (4,157 ft) above sea level, at the foot of Monte Cavallo, 2,250 metres (7,380 ft). On one of the peaks of Monte Cavallo there is a bronze statue of the Virgin Mary by the sculptor Pierino Sam Pordenone (1921-2010).

== Transport ==
Aviano is served by a station on the Sacile-Pinzano Railway: the Aviano railway station. The Sacile-Pinzano line connects the town of Sacile, on the Venice-Udine railway, to the village of Pinzano, on the Gemona del Friuli-Pinzano line.
As of today, the service is limited from Sacile to Maniago.

== Aviano Air Base ==
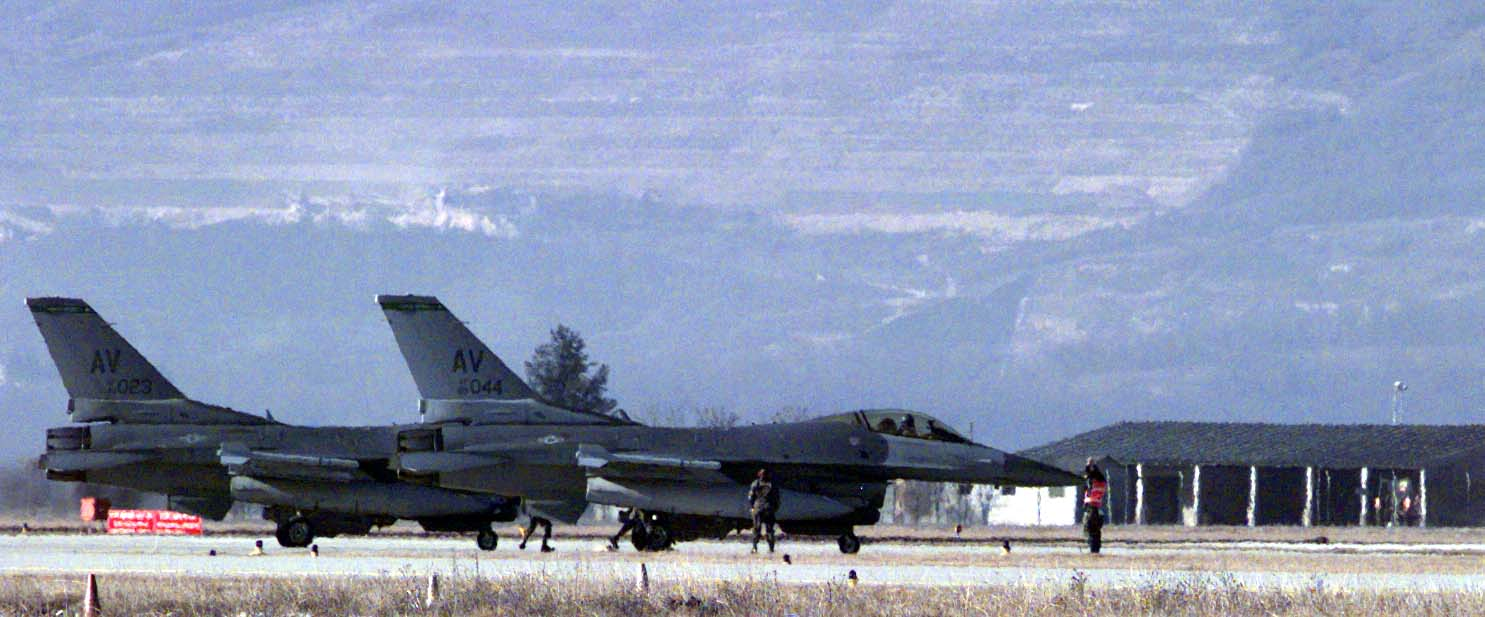
USAF F-16s in the Aviano air base.

Aviano Air Base was established by Italy in 1911. The base was among the first ones available to Italian aviation.

There has been an American presence at Aviano Air Base since the end of World War II. In 1954 the Italian and American governments signed a joint use agreement and by 1955, HQ United States Air Forces in Europe (USAFE) had moved its Italian operations from Udine to Aviano. The base went through a period of hosting rotational fighter squadrons. With the declining use of the Italian live fire range, the rotational squadrons became a thing of the past. Aviano became a war reserve material storage base and played a big part in Desert Storm. In 1992, HQ 16th Air Force and the 401st Fighter Wing moved from Torrejon Air Base, Spain to Aviano. The Wing became home to two F-16 fighter squadrons, the 510th FS and the 555th FS. Both squadrons relocated from Ramstein AB in 1994 and redesignated. The wing was redesignated from the 401st Fighter Wing to the 31st Fighter Wing in 1994 as Aviano took on permanently based aircraft for the first time in over 50 years. The base currently performs a NATO mission with close coordination with Italian personnel.

== International relations ==
Aviano is twinned with:

- Larissa, Greece

== People ==
- Marco d'Aviano (1631–1699), Capuchin friar confessor of Emperor Leopold I of Austria, was born in Aviano, in the hamlet of Villotta.
- Fabio Rossitto (1971), former football player in Italia Serie A and in the Italian national team.
- Amy Adams (1974), American actress who lived for nine years in Aviano; after this experience she named her daughter Aviana.
- Luca Manfè (1981), winner of MasterChef US season 4
