= Giuseppe Sensi =

Italian Cardinal

His Eminence Giuseppe Maria Sensi
- Cardinal-Priest of Regina Apostolorum
- Church: Roman Catholic Church
- Appointed: 22 June 1987
- Term ended: 26 July 2001
- Predecessor: Ermenegildo Florit
- Successor: Virgilio Noè
- Previous posts: Apostolic Nuncio to Costa Rica (1955–57); Titular Archbishop of Sardes (1955–76); Apostolic Delegate to Jerusalem and Palestine (1957–62); Apostolic Nuncio to Ireland (1962–67); Apostolic Nuncio to Portugal (1967–76); Cardinal-Deacon of Santi Biagio e Carlo ai Catinari (1976–87)

Orders
- Ordination: 21 December 1929
- Consecration: 24 July 1955 by Valerio Valeri
- Created cardinal: 24 May 1976 by Pope Paul VI
- Rank: Cardinal-Deacon (1976–87); Cardinal-Priest (1987–2001)

Personal details
- Born: Giuseppe Maria Sensi; 27 May 1907 Cosenza, Kingdom of Italy
- Died: 26 July 2001 (aged 94) Clinic Pio XI, Rome, Italy
- Education: Pontifical Lateran University; Pontifical Ecclesiastical Academy

Styles of Giuseppe Sensi
- Reference style: His Eminence
- Spoken style: Your Eminence
- Informal style: Cardinal
- See: Sardes (titular see)

Giuseppe Maria Sensi (27 May 1907 – 26 July 2001) was an Italian Cardinal of the Roman Catholic Church who served as a longtime Vatican diplomat.

== Biography ==
Sensi was born in Cosenza, Italy, on 27 May 1907, the sixth of ten children of a prominent local politician. He was ordained a priest in December 1929 at the age of 22.

In preparation for a diplomat's career he completed the course of study at the Pontifical Ecclesiastical Academy in 1931.

By 1934 he was working in the diplomatic service of the Holy See. He worked in minor roles in many nunciatures. Pope Pius XII named him Permanent Observer of the Holy See to UNESCO on 21 May 1953.

On 21 May 1955 Pope Pius XII appointed him Titular Archbishop of Sardes and Apostolic Nuncio to Costa Rica. He was consecrated a bishop on 24 July.

He was appointed Apostolic Delegate to Jerusalem and Palestine on 12 January 1957. Pope Paul VI appointed him on 10 May 1962 the Apostolic Nuncio to Ireland. He was transferred to Portugal on 8 July 1967.

On 24 May 1976 he was created Cardinal-Deacon of Santi Biagio e Carlo ai Catinari by Pope Paul at the age of 69. He took part in both of the conclaves of 1978 that elected Pope John Paul I and Pope John Paul II.

After ten years as a Cardinal Deacon he took the option of becoming a Cardinal-Priest on 22 June 1987, becoming Cardinal-Priest of Regina Apostolorum.

He died at the age of 94 on 26 July 2001.
