= Sacred ashes =

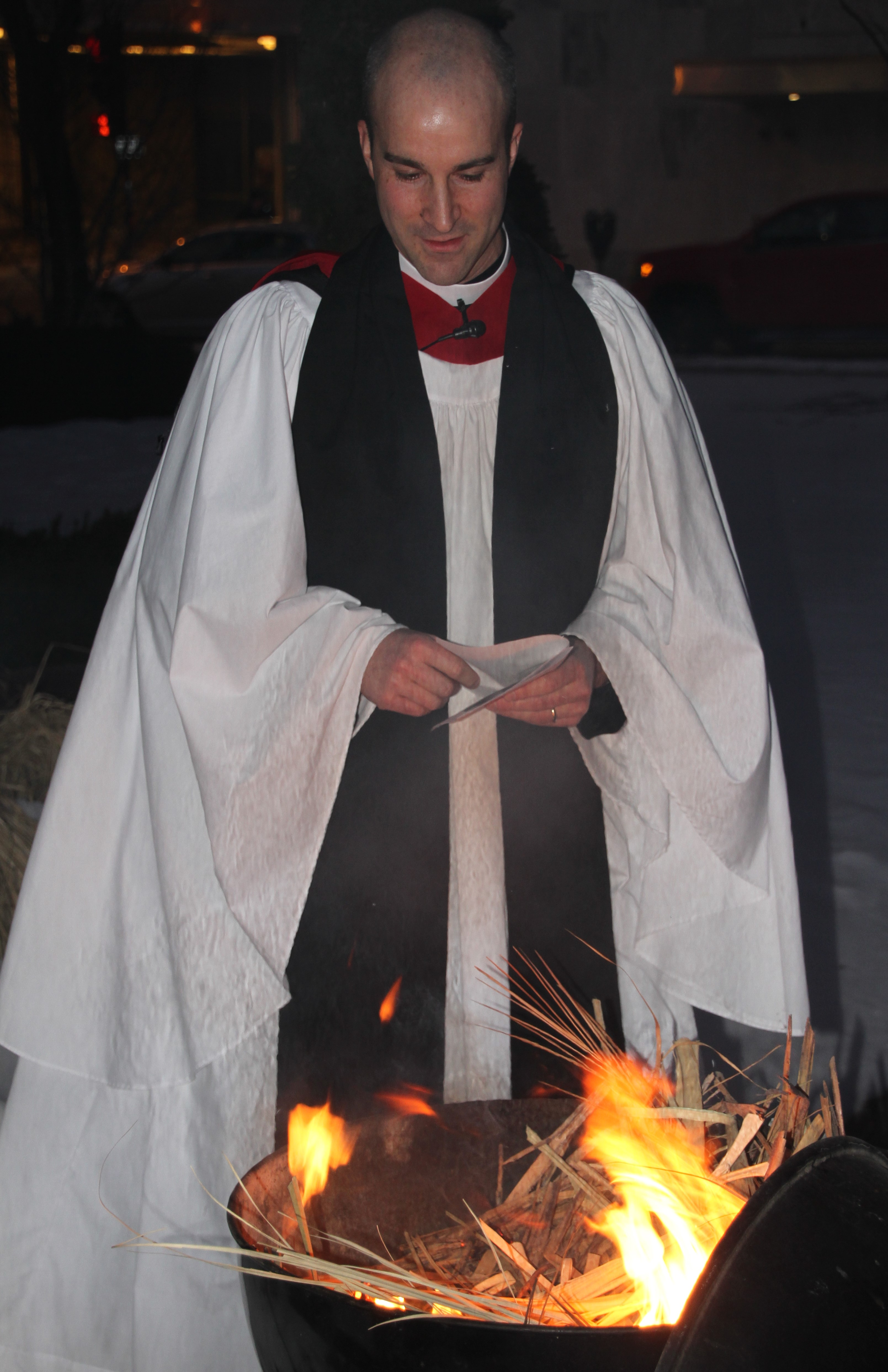
A deacon burning palm fronds from the previous Palm Sunday for Ash Wednesday

Sacred ashes are put to use in various religions.

== Background ==
In Christianity, specifically in Roman Catholicism and some Protestant denominations on Ash Wednesday, ashes of burnt palm leaves and fronds left over from Palm Sunday, mixed with olive oil, are applied in a cross-form on the forehead of the believer as a reminder of his inevitable physical death, with the intonation: "Dust thou art, and to dust will return" from Genesis 3:19 in the Old Testament.

In Hinduism, sacred ashes or Vibhuti are used to smear, anoint or mark devotees.

== See also ==
- Vibhuti
