= Daughters of St. Paul =

Roman Catholic religious congregation for women

The Daughters of St. Paul
- Figlie di San Paolo
- Abbreviation: F.S.P.
- Formation: 1915
- Type: Religious congregation
- Location: Worldwide: Rome, Italy In the US: Boston, MA
- Superior General: Sr. Anna Caiazza, fsp
- Key people: Blessed James Alberione, Venerable Mother Thecla Merlo
- Staff: 2155
- Website: www.paoline.org, www.daughtersofstpaul.com, www.paulines.ph

The Daughters of St. Paul (Latin: Filiae Sancti Pauli; Italian: Figlie di San Paolo), also known as the Media Nuns, are an international Catholic religious congregation of consecrated women founded in 1915 in Italy.

The congregation is part of the worldwide Pauline Family, one of the ten institutes founded by James Alberione, and operates in 51 countries around the world. The Daughters operate Pauline Books and Media Centres across the world. In addition, they also run Media Education Centres, Radio and Internet Channels (YouTube), and related institutions across the globe.

== History ==
The Congregation of the Daughters of St. Paul was founded on 15 June 1915 in Alba, Italy. Mother Thecla Merlo (born Maria Teresa Merlo) assisted in the founding and development of the Daughters of St. Paul and other Pauline institutes that developed throughout the 20th century.

On June 15, 1915, James Alberione established the women's workshop from which the Daughters of St. Paul developed began: the women religious were to teach women work skills, train catechists and run stores selling books and religious articles. Alberione entrusted the leadership of the group to Teresa Merlo (1894-1964), in religion Sister Thecla. In 1918, at the invitation of the local bishop, the Paulines opened their first branch in Susa, where they took over the editorship of the diocesan weekly la Valsusa.

The institute's first nine women religious made their perpetual profession of vows on July 22, 1922. The Pious Society Daughters of St. Paul was erected into a congregation of diocesan right by Joseph Francis Re, bishop of Alba, on March 15, 1929; it received the pontifical decree of praise on Dec. 13, 1943, and its constitutions were finally approved by the Holy See on March 15, 1953. The general headquarters is in Rome.

== Apostolate ==
The Daughters of St. Paul are dedicated to the apostolate of printing: they own the publishing house Edizioni Paoline and operate bookstores, distribution agencies, printing houses, bindery and multimedia centers present all over the world.

== Locations ==
They are present in Europe (Czechia, France, Germany, Italy, Poland, Portugal, United Kingdom, Romania, Russia, Spain, Switzerland), in the Americas (Argentina, Bolivia, Brazil, Canada, Chile, Colombia, Dominican Republic, Ecuador, Mexico, Paraguay, Peru, Puerto Rico, United States of America, Uruguay, Venezuela), in Africa (Angola, Democratic Republic of Congo, Côte d'Ivoire, Equatorial Guinea, Ghana, Kenya, Madagascar, Mozambique, Nigeria, South Africa, South Sudan, Tanzania, Uganda, Zambia, Zimbabwe), in Asia (South Korea, Philippines, Japan, Hong Kong, India, Macau, Malaysia, Pakistan, Singapore, Taiwan, Thailand) and in Oceania (Australia)[4].

=== Pakistan ===
The congregation came to Pakistan at the invitation of Bishop Francis Cialeo of Faisalabad in 1958.

In 2009 there were 12 nuns, five of whom are local women, 8 novices and 20 aspirants. Sister Daniela Baronchelli who has worked in Pakistan for 22 years founded the first local community of the Daughters of St Paul in Karachi.

In every mission they put evangelization first, followed by programmes of spiritual and material assistance to the poor with a series of initiatives: social centres, medical care, education. They give special attention to children and young people. In Pakistan they have a primary and a secondary school and various other activities.

==== Karachi ====
The inauguration of a book shop in Karachi in 1966 by Archbishop Joseph Cordeiro was the first in a Muslim country. It is located on Syedna Burhanuddin Road (formerly Mansfield Road). The sisters served the community by offering prayer books, bibles and religious articles. This book centre was reconsecrated by Archbishop Evarist Pinto on 30 June 2005.

The police raided the Sisters' bookshop in Karachi in June 2005, for allegedly issuing literature or materials which hurt the feelings or beliefs of other religions. The Daughters of St. Paul have been selling CDs, videos and Christian literature and material about the Christian religion and moral teachings in Karachi since 1948.

In 2015, the bookshop celebrated the 50th year in the city.

==== Lahore ====
In January 1968, Sr. Ignatia Balla, the superior general in Rome visited Pakistan to determine the need for the opening of a second community in Lahore upon the request of the Bishops from the Punjab. On 27 July 1968, four sisters started work in Lahore. Four religious books for adults and four books for children were published in Urdu. The Sisters also welcomed the first Pakistani vocations. The sisters are involved in the wider area of communications. Sister Magdaline Ishaq chaired a World Communications Day seminar at her convent in Lahore on 27 April 2008. The nuns run three communications centers in Lahore, Karachi and Rawalpindi. The Daughters of St. Paul also conducted one-hour lectures on communication and its effects in a number of Catholic schools. The sisters also have a bookshop on the premises of the Sacred Heart Cathedral, Lahore. The cathedral was one of several buildings damaged or destroyed by a bomb blast in Lahore in May 2009.

The shops of the Sisters in the main cities also act as the main channel of distribution for the products of WAVE Studio.

In 2016, Sister Athens Angeles of the Daughters of St. Paul held a lesson for their sisters, encouraging them to use social networks with a missionary purpose. According to Angeles this opens up "the possibility of new vocations, better understanding of the mission at a local level, elevation of the dignity of women, opportunities for dialogue with the modern world and greater support to pastoral work".

On 16 November 2019, the sisters used the launch of the Year of Youth 2020 at the Sacred Heart Cathedral, Lahore to unveil the Urdu translation of Christus vivit, the message of Pope Francis written in response to the 2018 synod.

==== Islamabad-Rawalpindi ====
In 2006, two Sisters from Karachi started a new home in the diocese of Islamabad-Rawalpindi, where a book shop had already been built in front of the Bishop's House. In January 2012 a youth group from the Cathedral Parish launched a new website for realising the potential of youth and expressing their concerns in a Christian way. It is hoped that the website will also help counter fundamentalism and fanaticism.

==== Multan ====
In 2017 Bishop Benny Mario Travas inaugurated the book shop of the Daughters of St. Paul in the Multan Diocese.

== See also ==
- Pauline Family
- Society of Saint Paul
- Sisters of the Little Way
