= Giuseppe Nascimbeni =

Blessed Giuseppe Nascimbeni
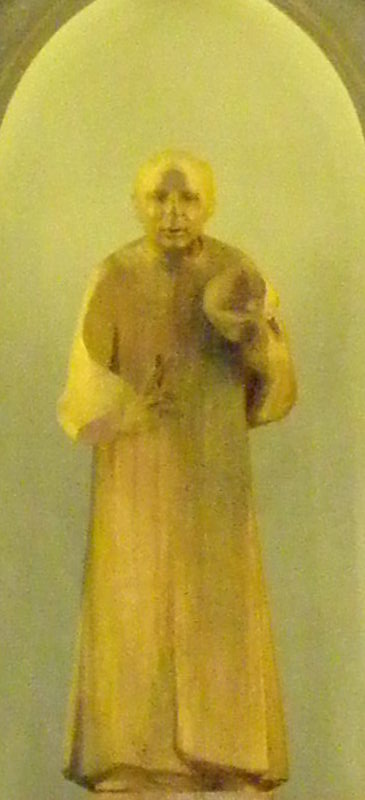

Priest
- Born: 22 March 1851; Torri del Benaco, Verona, Kingdom of Lombardy–Venetia
- Died: 22 January 1922 (aged 70); Castelletto del Garda, Verona, Kingdom of Italy
- Venerated in: Roman Catholic Church
- Beatified: 17 April 1988, Saint Peter's Basilica, Vatican City by Pope John Paul II
- Feast: 22 January
- Attributes: Cassock; Crucifix
- Patronage: Little Sisters of the Holy Family

Giuseppe Nascimbeni (22 March 1851 – 22 January 1922) was an Italian Roman Catholic priest who exercised his pastoral mission in his home of Verona and who also established the Little Sisters of the Holy Family.

Pope John Paul II beatified him in 1988 on account of his holiness and a miracle attributed to his intercession; his feast is celebrated on the date of his death or "dies natalis" (birth into Heaven).

== Life ==
Giuseppe Nascimbeni was born on 22 March 1851 in Verona. He grew up in a Christian environment and his vocation to religious life grew well into his adolescence. He started his studies in Verona to respond to this calling.

He was ordained to the priesthood on 9 August 1874 and served as a teacher at San Pietro di Lavagno until 1877. Cardinal Luigi di Canossa ordained him. At the same time he served as a simple parish priest at Castelletto del Garda and worked to improve living conditions. To that end he restored plumbing and electrical services and implemented new mail and telegraph services to connect the village with the rest of the nation. He also founded his own religious congregation to help with town works when the Ursulines were unable to do so. The order received the papal approval of Pope Pius X in 1909.

Nascimbeni suffered from a stroke on 31 December 1916 and spent the remainder of his life in a wheelchair. He remained in the shadow of ill health and was plagued with various illnesses that included influenza and diabetes. He died in 1922 mere hours after the death of Pope Benedict XV. His order spread after his death from places such as Albania and Angola.

== Beatification ==
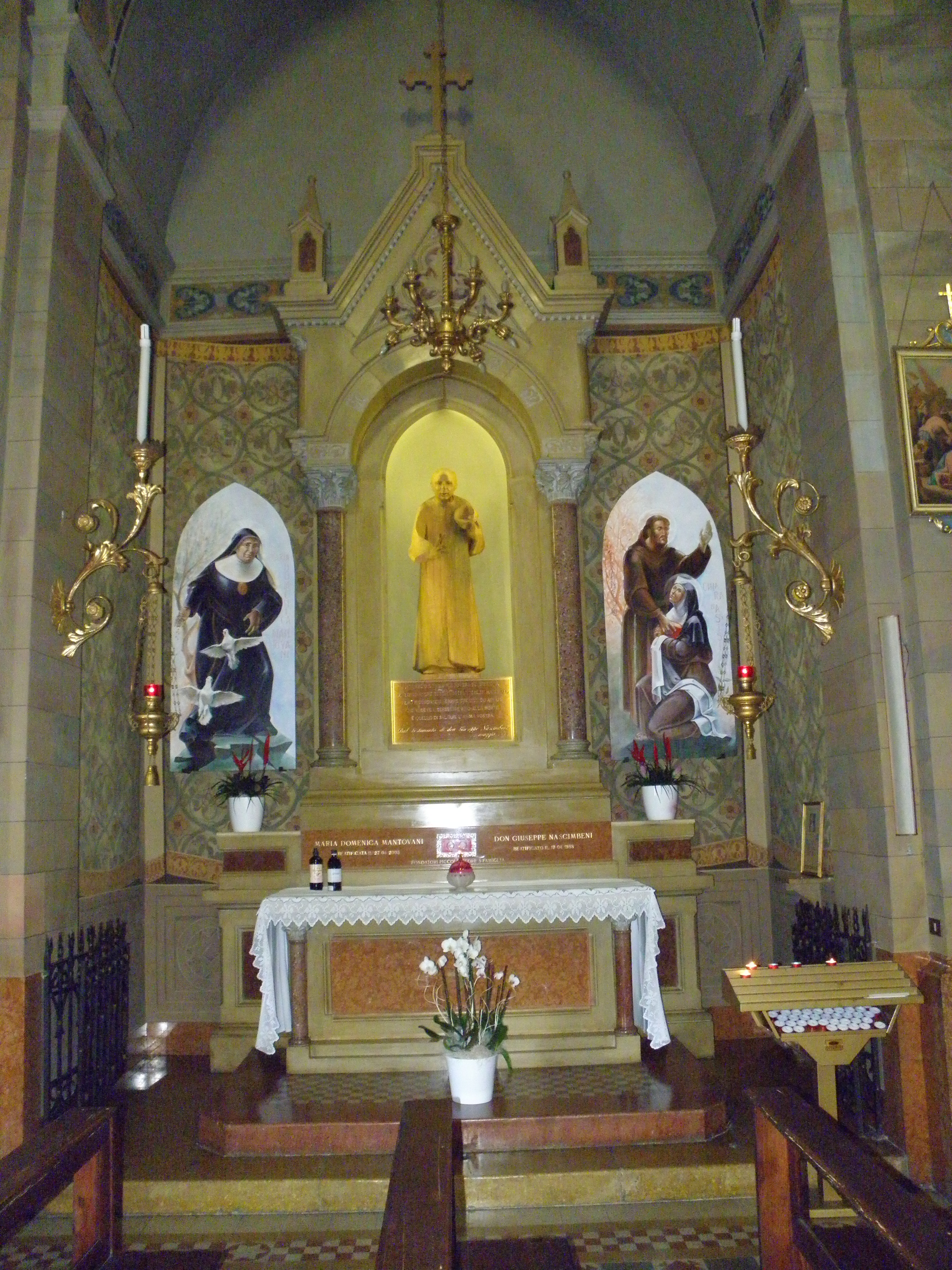
Tomb of Giuseppe Nascimbeni.

The beatification process commenced in his hometown on 4 December 1980 which conferred upon him the title Servant of God. The introduction of the cause saw the implementation of two diocesan tribunals which received formal ratification before the cause could proceed to the next phase. The Positio - the result of the two processes - was submitted to the Congregation for the Causes of Saints in 1983.

Pope John Paul II approved the findings and his life of heroic virtue on 17 February 1984 and declared him to be Venerable. The miracle needed for beatification was investigated and approved on 26 September 1986. The pope approved it in mid 1987 and beatified him on 17 April 1988.
