= Sisters of Jesus the Good Shepherd =

Pastorelle Sisters
- Sisters of Jesus the Good Shepherd
- Suore Jesu Buen Pastor
- Abbreviation: S.J.B.P. (Suore Jesu Buen Pastor)
- Formation: 7 October 1938
- Founder: Blessed James Alberione
- Type: Catholic religious order
- Members: 550
- Leader: Sr. Marta Finotelli
- Affiliations: Catholic Church
- Website: pastorelle.org

The Sisters of Jesus the Good Shepherd (Latin: Suore Jesu Buen Pastor; postnominal abbreviation: S.J.B.P.), also known as the Pastorelle Sisters, is a Catholic religious institute founded by Father James Alberione in Italy on 7 October 1938. Members of the order, who are referred to as Pastorelle, generally carry the letters S.J.B.P. after their names, standing for Suore Jesu Buen Pastor, meaning of the Sisters of Jesus the Good Shepherd.

== History ==
The Community was founded by James Alberione on October 7, 1938. The Sisters assist pastors and pastoral ministers, working in schools and parishes by providing religious instruction. They are involved in evangelization, catechesis, liturgical animation, formation of pastoral associates, and in other forms of service. They are familiarly known as Pastorelles, and are part of the Pauline Family of institutes founded by Alberione. The generalate is in Rome.

In the Philippines, they run Jesus Good Shepherd School in Imus. In Nigeria, the sisters work in St. John's Parish, Okpaugwu.

== Provinces ==
The Congregation is present in Albania, Argentina, Australia, Bolivia, Brazil, Chile, Colombia, Cuba, Gabon, Italy, Japan, Mexico, Mozambique, Peru, Philippines, Saipan, South Korea, Taiwan, United States of America, Uruguay and Venezuela.

It has five provinces and four delegations, as follows:

- Italy Central North - Mozambique Province
- Italy Central South - Albania Province
- Brazil St. Paul - Gabon Province
- Brazil Caxias do Sul - Uruguay Province
- Philippines - Australia - Saipan - Taiwan Province
- Argentina - Bolivia Delegation
- Chile - Peru Delegation
- Colombia - Venezuela - Mexico Delegation
- Korea Delegation

== See also ==
- Pauline Family
