= Pauline Family =

Catholic religious congregation

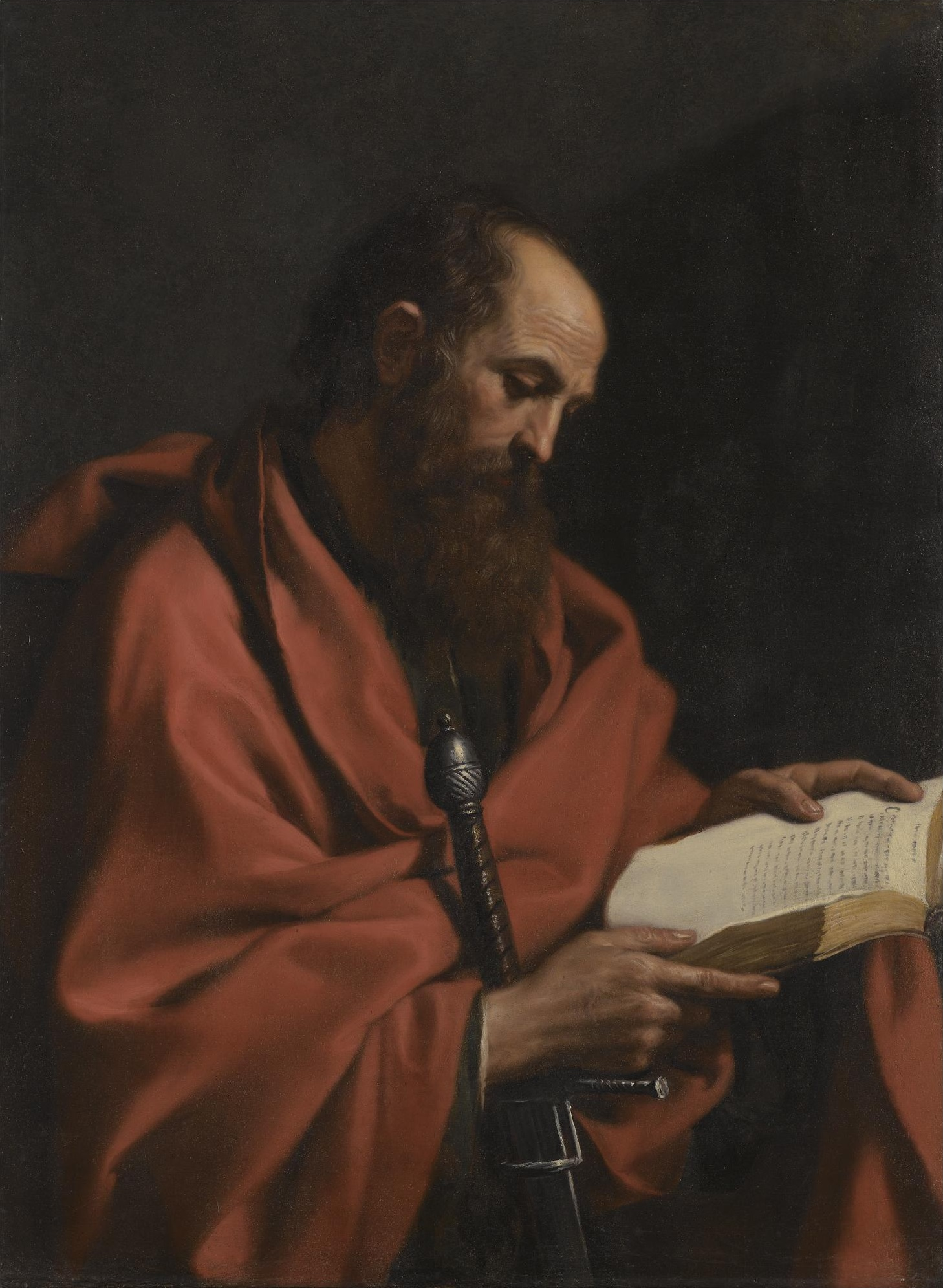
The Pauline Family recognizes Saint Paul the Apostle as its father, model and inspiration.

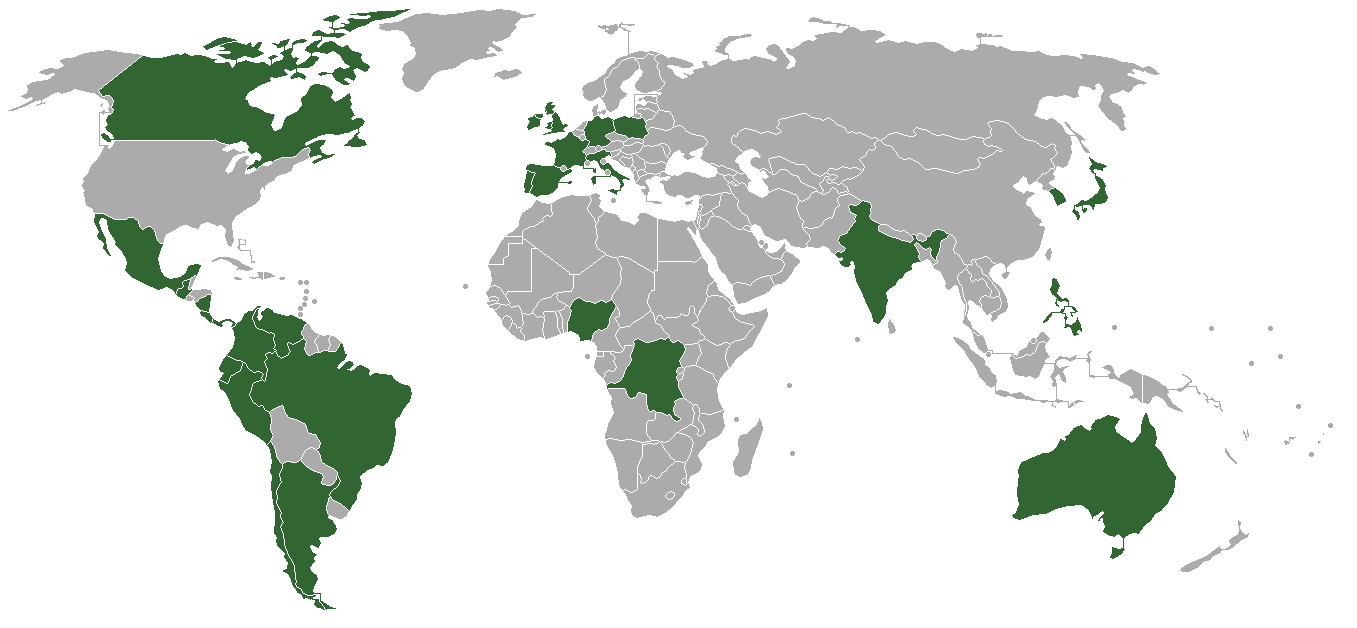
Presence of the Pauline Family around the world as of 2006.

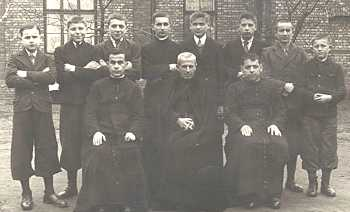
The first Polish Paulines with Fr. Alberione (seated in the center).

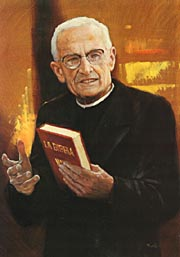
Giacomo Alberione

The Pauline Family refers to a number of institutes of consecrated life (religious and aggregated institutes) and an association of lay collaborators established between 1914 and 1959, which all share the same founder, Blessed Giacomo Alberione (1884–1971) and the same spirituality. Their mission is to evangelize with the modern tools of communications.

== Members ==
The worldwide Pauline family consists of:

Five religious institutes

- Society of Saint Paul (SSP) (1914), also known as Pauline Fathers and Brothers, are active in: editorial and bookstores, journalism, cinematography, television, radio, audiovisual, multimedia, telematics; centers of studies, research, formation, and animation.
- Daughters of Saint Paul (FSP) (1915), also known as Pauline Sisters, operate in Pauline Books and Media Centres as well Media Education Centres, Radio and Internet Channels, and related institutions.
  - Sisters Servants of the Visitation (AV) (1978) – a group of 31 Pauline Sisters who served at a hospital for sick religious women in Albano, formed a new congregation in 1978 led by Suor Vincenza Minet and with the blessing of Fr. Alberione. However, the new congregation was not aggregated to the Pauline Family.
- Pious Disciples of the Divine Master (PDDM) (1924), the contemplative sisters focus on the Eucharist, adoration of the Blessed Sacrament, and praying for priests. In each of their convents, the sisters operate a Liturgical Apostolate Center to provide articles of the faith for lay worshippers and clergy alike: books, artwork, liturgical vestments, icons, rosaries, prayer cards, incense, liturgical vessels, altar linens, and more. They also accept special requests.
- Sisters of Jesus the Good Shepherd] (SJBP) (1938), also known as Pastorelle Sisters, work in pastoral ministry, assisting pastors and other pastoral ministers with evangelization, catechesis, liturgical animation, formation of pastoral associates, and in other forms of service.
- Sisters of Mary, Queen of Apostles (AP) (1959), also known as Apostoline Sisters, work in vocations discernment and counselling.

Four secular institutes

- Institute of Jesus the Priest (IJS) (1960) – for Catholic Diocesan Priests and Bishops
- Institute of Gabriel the Archangel (ISGA) (1960), also known as Gabrielites – for single Catholic men
- Institute of Our Lady of the Annunciation (INSA) (1960), also known as Annunciationists – for single Catholic women
- Institute of the Holy Family (ISF) (1963) – for married and widowed Catholics.

One association of lay collaborators

- Association of Pauline Cooperators (APC) (1918)

== Saints and Blesseds ==
=== Blesseds ===
- Timoteo Giaccardo, SSP (1896–1948)
  - Declared "Venerable": 9 May 1985
  - Beatified: 22 October 1989 by Pope John Paul II
- Giacomo Alberione, SSP (1884–1971)
  - Declared "Venerable": 25 June 1996
  - Beatified: 27 April 2003 by Pope John Paul II

=== Venerables ===
- Francesco Chiesa (1874–1946)
  - Declared "Venerable": 8 February 1988
- Maggiorino Vigolungo SSP (1904–1918)
  - Declared "Venerable": 28 March 1988
- Andrea Maria Borello, SSP (1916–1948)
  - Declared "Venerable": 3 March 1990
- Tecla Merlo, FSP (1894–1964)
  - Declared "Venerable": 22 January 1991
- Maria Scolastica Rivata, PDDM (1897–1987)
  - Declared "Venerable": 9 December 2013

=== Servants of God ===
- Teresa Sivilli Ugenti (1914-1984)
- Francesco Fasola, IJS (1898–1988)
- Nicola Riezzo, IJS (1904–1998)
- Francesco Ugenti (1913-1998)
- Bernardo Antonini, IJS (1932-2002)
- Stefano Lamera, SSP (1912–1997)

=== Other saintly members ===
- Michele Alberione (1837–1904)
- Teresa Allocco Alberione (1850–1903)
- Rosaria Nazzari, SJBP (1912–1915)
- Claudia Da Sois, SJBP (1921–1957)
- Elisabetta Franchi, SJBP (1934–1961)
- Ferdinando Michele Gagna, SSP (1910–1961)
- Tommaso Dragone, SSP (1911–1974)
- Giovanni Evangelista RobaldoSSP (1896–1977)
- Maria Giuseppina Cosner, SJBP (1927–1978)
- Nazarena Morando, FSP (1904–1984)
- Giovanni Roatta, SSP (1913–1985)
- Maria Giacomina Cardenti, SJBP (1925–2000)
- Maria Lucia Ricci, PDDM (1914–2001)
- Fedele Pasquero, SSP (1911–2001)
- Valentino Gambi, SSP (1913–2002)
- Luigina Borrano, FSP (1913–2002)
- Ignazia Balla, FSP (1909–2003)
- Giuseppe Barbero, SSP (1910–2003)
- Concettina Borgogno, FSP (1914–2003)
- Antonietta Martini, FSP (1937–2003)
- Giovannina Boffa, FSP (1914–2004)
- Justin Daniel Bataclan, SSP (1986–2007)
- Assunta Bassi, FSP (1915–2012)
- Gabriele Amorth, SSP (1926–2016)

== See also ==
- Order of Saint Paul the First Hermit
- Paulists
- Regina degli Apostoli alla Montagnola
