= Society of Saint Paul =

Catholic religious order

- Societas a Sancto Paulo Apostolo
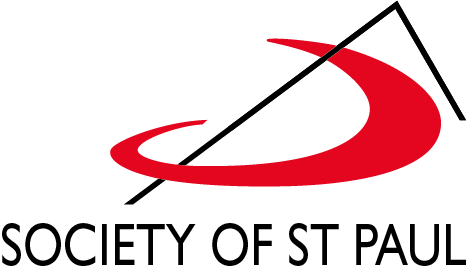
- Abbreviation: SSP (post-nominals)
- Nickname: Paulines
- Formation: 20 August 1914; 110 years ago
- Founder: Giacomo Alberione
- Founded at: Alba, Piedmont, Italy
- Type: Clerical Religious Congregation of Pontifical Right for Men
- Headquarters: Motherhouse: Via Alessandro Severo 58, 00145 Rome, Italy
- Members: 828 members (493 priests) as of 2020
- Superior General: Domenico Soliman
- Ministry: Social communication work
- Parent organization: Roman Catholic Church
- Website: paulus.net

The Society of Saint Paul the Apostle (Latin: Societas a Sancto Paulo Apostolo) abbreviated SSP and also known as the Paulines, is a Catholic clerical religious congregation of pontifical right for men founded on 20 August 1914 at Alba, Piedmont in Italy by Giacomo Alberione and officially approved by the Holy See on 27 June 1949. Its members add the nominal letters SSP. after their names to indicate membership in the congregation.

== History ==
In 1912 Alberione began publication of the magazine Vita pastorale, and the following year assumed direction of the diocesan weekly Gazzetta d`Alba. In August 1914, he opened the “Little Workers” Typographical School, which would develop into the future Society of St Paul (SSP). In 1926, Alberione sent his associate, Giuseppe Giaccardo, to establish a house in Rome. (Giaccardo was beatified in 1989.) The society was canonically erected in 1927 in Alba. Foundations were established in Brazil, Argentina and the United States in 1931.

The constitutions were approved in 1941 and the society was approved officially by the Holy See on 27 June 1949, with the mission to "evangelize with the modern tools of communications".

In 1969, Pope Paul VI honoured Alberione and the Society of Saint Paul with the Pro Ecclesia et Pontifice award.

== Apostolate ==
Its members are known as the Paulines—a name also applied to the much older Order of Saint Paul the First Hermit. Faithful to the mission assigned them by their founder, they communicate the Christian message with the use of all means that technology puts at the disposition of modern man.

The society is based in Rome and is present in about 32 countries. Members are active in several fields: editorial and bookstores, journalism, cinematography, television, radio, audiovisual, multimedia, telematics; centres of studies, research, formation, animation.

In the USA, the congregation has a publishing house based in Staten Island, New York. ST PAULS is the leading Catholic online bookstore in the Philippines, carrying bibles, books, religious statues, rosaries, etc. In India, the congregation manages two media colleges – St Paul's Institute of Communication Education (SPICE) in Mumbai and St Paul's College in Bangalore.

The society is one of ten religious and lay institutes founded by the priest Giacomo Alberione, who was proclaimed Blessed by Pope John Paul II on 20 December 2002. Members of the Pauline family included the Daughters of St. Paul and the Sisters of Jesus the Good Shepherd.

== See also ==
- Pauline Family
- Paulist Fathers, separate order
- Paulists, separate orders
- Nippon Cultural Broadcasting (Founded by Society of Saint Paul)
