= Giuseppe Giaccardo =

Blessed Giuseppe Giaccardo S.S.P.
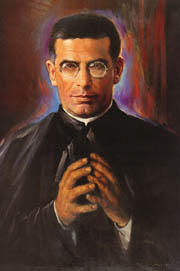

Priest
- Born: 13 June 1896; Narzole, Cuneo, Kingdom of Italy
- Died: 24 January 1948 (aged 51); Rome, Lazio, Italy
- Venerated in: Roman Catholic Church
- Beatified: 22 October 1989, Saint Peter's Square, Vatican City by Pope John Paul II
- Major shrine: Basilica di Santa Maria Regina degli Apostoli alla Montagnola, Italy
- Feast: 22 October
- Attributes: Priest's cassock
- Patronage: Society of Saint Paul

Giuseppe Giaccardo (13 June 1896 - 24 January 1948) was an Italian Roman Catholic priest and a professed member of the Society of Saint Paul that Giacomo Alberione established. Giaccardo became the latter's closest aide and confidant and was involved in promoting the congregation and the Pauline charism. His profession into the order saw him assume the religious name of "Timoteo".

He became a Servant of God on 10 December 1964 under Pope Paul VI when the sainthood process commenced. Pope John Paul II declared him to be Venerable in 1985 and beatified Giaccardo on 22 October 1989; his liturgical feast is assigned for 22 October.

== Life ==
Giuseppe Giaccardo was born in Cuneo on 13 June 1896 to the farmers Stefano Giaccardo and Maria Cagna as the eldest of five children. Giaccardo was given the names of "Giuseppe Domenico Vincenzo" when he was baptized. He was ill to the point of near-death at the age of six months which resulted in a miraculous cure after his parents turned to the intercession of the Blessed Virgin Mary.

As a child he had a little statue of the Blessed Virgin Mary on a ledge in his room and he also served as a Mass server. He was known for his docile nature and for his ardent devotion to the Blessed Mother.

Giaccardo met the priest Giacomo Alberione as a child at the age of twelve. It was Alberione who heard Giaccardo's first confession and was impressed with the latter's spirit and devotion to the sacraments. In 1908 the priest invited Giaccardo to go with him to Alba to start his studies to become a priest. He studied for the priesthood in Alba from the age of twelve - after entering on 17 October 1908 - due to the support of Alberione (the latter also taught there).

On 22 January 1915 he was drafted and assigned to the 2nd Company of Health in Alexandria but was discharged on 7 January 1916 due to oligemia (anemia). In his journal in 1916 he said: "I want to become a saint. Transform me into You".

He was aged thirteen when he entered the Paulines - that Alberione established - and in 1917 asked the Bishop of Alba for permission to leave his studies to join Alberione to which the bishop was reluctant to approve. On 4 September 1917 he assumed the religious name of "Timoteo". The Bishop of Alba later allowed Giaccardo to resume his studies not long after this. Giaccardo received ordination to the priesthood on 19 October 1919 from the Bishop of Alba Giuseppe Francesco Re; he was allowed to be ordained sooner than his classmates so that his mother - on her deathbed with cancer - could see his ordination. In 1919 he was made the Vice-Superior and the Treasurer of the Paulines. He made his religious vows in 1920. Alberione would go on to call Giaccardo "the most faithful of the faithful" while fellow Paulines would refer to him as "Signor Maestro. On 12 November 1920 he graduated in theological studies in Genoa with honours.

On 6 January 1926 he was sent to Rome on Alberione's wishes to establish the institute's first house; he arrived on 15 January 1926 with a mere 3000 lire and would later come into contact with the Benedictine Alfredo Ildefonso Schuster. Giaccardo mediated matters between Alberione and Pope Pius XI in relation to the approval of the congregation after meeting the pope in 1926 and with Cardinal Camillo Laurenti on 13 July 1926. Giaccardo was present in Rome for the convocation and celebration of the 1933-1934 Holy Year of Redemption.

He returned to Alba in 1936 as the director of the mother-house and dedicated himself to the cultural and spiritual formation of the Sisters Disciples of the Divine Master - Alberione's new Pauline institute. He was recalled to Rome in 1946 to serve as the Vicar General of the institute there. He contributed to Alberione's new religious congregation - also of the Pauline charism - which was established on 3 April 1947 in the Church of Saint Paul in Alba on the occasion of the Last Supper.

In the latter half of 1947 he began to feel ill; November 1947 saw him go to several Pauline houses for inspection. Doctor Tommaso Teodoli diagnosed him with leukemia and Giaccardo began to tell others of his failing health. He celebrated his final Mass on the morning of 12 January 1948 - the same morning that Pope Pius XII approved the Sisters Disciples of the Divine Master. Alberione gave him the Viaticum before his death.

Giaccardo died on the eve of the Feast of the Conversion of Saint Paul due to leukaemia. Cardinal Schuster wrote - on 25 January 1948 - of the profound loss he felt in the death of Giaccardo. His funeral was celebrated on 26 January 1948 in which the homilist was Alberione. He was buried in the Basilica di Santa Maria Regina degli Apostoli alla Montagnola.

== Beatification ==
The beatification process commenced in the Diocese of Rome in an informative process that commenced on 8 June 1955 and finished on 19 June 1957. The first of two smaller processes opened in Alba on 7 June 1955 and concluded on 6 November 1956. The formal introduction to the cause on 10 December 1964 - under Pope Paul VI - granted the posthumous title of Servant of God upon the late priest.

An apostolic process was later opened on 20 May 1965 and concluded its work on 26 October 1967 while the second and final of the smaller processes opened in Alba on 22 July 1965 and closed on 13 October 1967. The Congregation of Rites validated these four processes in Rome on 19 December 1969. In 1979 - one decade later - the postulation submitted the Positio to the Congregation for the Causes of Saints for their assessment. On 9 May 1985 he was declared to be Venerable after Pope John Paul II recognized his life of heroic virtue.

The miracle required for his beatification was investigated in the Italian diocese of its origin and received the validation of the C.C.S. in Rome on 27 May 1988. The medical board voted in favor of the miracle on 9 November 1988 while the theologians did likewise on 3 February 1989. The pope voiced his approval on 13 May 1989 and presided over the beatification of Giaccardo on 22 October 1989.

The current postulator assigned to the cause is José Antonio Pérez Sánchez.
