= James Alberione =

Italian Catholic priest (1884–1971)

Blessed James Alberione S.S.P.
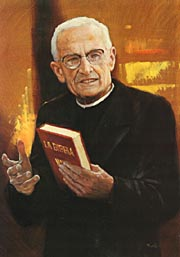

Priest, religious founder and publisher
- Born: 4 April 1884; Fossano, Province of Cuneo, Kingdom of Italy
- Died: 26 November 1971 (aged 87); Rome, Lazio, Italy
- Venerated in: Roman Catholic Church (Pauline Family)
- Beatified: 27 April 2003 by Pope John Paul II
- Feast: 26 November

James Alberione, SSP (Italian: Giacomo) (4 April 1884 – 26 November 1971), was an Italian Catholic priest, and the founder of the Society of St. Paul, of the Daughters of St. Paul, of the Sister Disciples of the Divine Master, of the Pious Disciples of the Divine Master, of the Sisters of Jesus the Good Shepherd, of the Sisters of Mary Queen of the Apostles, and other religious institutes, which form the Pauline Family. The first two groups are best known for promoting the Catholic faith through various forms of modern media.

== Early life ==
Alberione was born on 4 April 1884, in San Lorenzo di Fossano, Cuneo, then in the Kingdom of Italy. The Alberione family, made up of Michael Alberione, Teresa Allocco and their six children, were farmers. He was the fourth son of a peasant family and had a more delicate physical constitution than his brothers. At the age of sixteen, James entered the seminary of Alba, Piedmont, financially aided by his uncle James, his godfather from whom his name is derived. At the seminary of Alba, his spiritual director was Canon Francesco Chiesa, who is now a "Venerable".

On the night of 31 December 1900, the night that divided the 19th and 20th centuries, he prayed for five hours before the Blessed Sacrament and contemplating the future, felt that he was called to do something for the people of the new century. Inspired by the example of Saint John Bosco (1815-1888), he was one of the first to engage in a mission to educate and evangelize exclusively through the mass media.

== Founder ==
Alberione was ordained on 29 June 1907 (Feast of Sts. Peter and Paul), and became a parish priest in Narzole. He received his doctorate in theology in 1908. Alberione founded a total of ten religious congregations, aggregated institutes, and lay cooperators. These congregations use modern media technology and published materials to spread the word of God and help in personal devotions.

=== Society of St. Paul ===
On August 20, 1914, he put two teenagers, Desiderio Costa and Tito Armani, to work in a small pressroom under the guidance of a printer friend of his. Thus began the "Little Printing School of Typography" now known today as The Society of St. Paul whose purpose is to "Live and to Give Jesus Master the Way, the Truth, and the Life" through the most modern means of communications, press, cinema, television, radio and other modern media.

== Other congregations ==
After founding the "Little Printing School" (now Society of St. Paul) he gathered a group of women in 1915; together with Venerable Mother Tecla Merlo, he founded the female counterpart of the Society of St. Paul, the Daughters of St. Paul.

More congregations and institutes followed after. Thus he founded:

- 1924: The Pious Disciples of the Divine Master (PDDM), with Servant of God Mother Maria Scolastica Rivata, the contemplative members of the Pauline Family whose members would be especially dedicated to adoration, liturgical preparations, and priestly services
- 1938: The Sisters of Jesus the Good Shepherd (also known as "Pastorelle") works in schools and parishes by providing religious instruction
- 1957: The Sisters of Mary Queen of Apostles, who work and pray for vocations for the Pauline family and the Religious life
- 1958: The Institute of St. Gabriel the Archangel, lay consecrated men whose apostolate is also that of the Society of St. Paul
- 1958: The Institute of Mary of the Annunciation, lay consecrated women whose apostolate is also that of the Society of St. Paul
- 1959: The Institute of Jesus the Priest, diocesan clergy who would like to adopt the Pauline spirituality to their ministry
- 1960: The Institute of the Holy Family, married couples
- 1918: The Association of Pauline Cooperators

Alberione served during the Second Vatican Council as a peritus (theological expert), participating in the private sessions during which the decrees of the Council were formed and shaped, for the approval of the Council Fathers in full session.

== Death and veneration ==
Alberione died of natural causes on 26 November 1971 in the Generalate House of the Society in Rome. He had received a personal visit by Pope Paul VI an hour before he died. He was buried in the sub-crypt of the Basilica of Mary Queen of the Apostles in Rome.

Alberione was declared venerable on 25 June 1996, and was beatified on 27 April 2003 by Pope John Paul II, along with five others: Marco d'Aviano, a priest and member of the Order of Friars Minor Capuchin; Eugenia Ravasco, virgin and founder of the Congregations of the Daughters of the Sacred Hearts of Jesus and Mary; Maria Domenica Mantovani, virgin and co-founder of the Institute of the Little Sisters of the Holy Family; Maria Cristina of the Immaculate Conception Brando, founder of the Congregation of the Sisters, Expiatory Victims of Jesus in the Blessed Sacrament, and Giulia Salzano, virgin and founder of the Congregation of the Catechist Sisters of the Sacred Heart. The pope said, during his homily for the ceremony, said that Alberione left "a formidable heritage". According to John Paul II, Alberione "felt the need to make Jesus Christ, the Way, the Truth and the Life, known 'to all people of our time with the means of our time', as he liked to say. He was inspired by the Apostle Paul, whom he described as a 'theologian and architect of the Church', remaining ever docile and faithful to the Magisterium of the Successor of Peter, a 'beacon' of truth in a world that is so often devoid of sound spiritual references".

== Legacy ==
Alberione used modern means of mass communication to spread his message.
