= Marco d'Aviano =

Italian Capuchin friar

Blessed Mark of Aviano O.F.M. Cap.
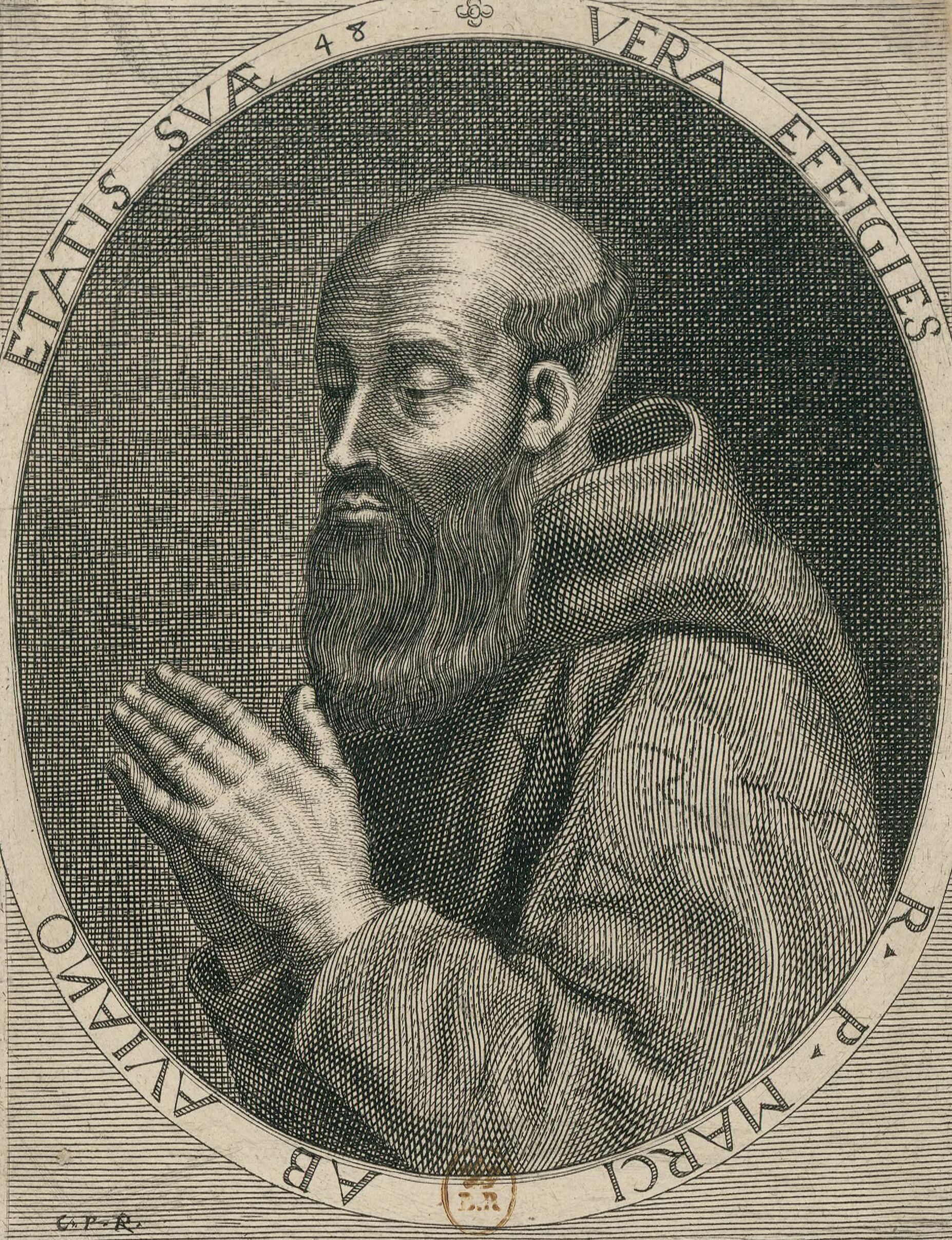

Priest
- Born: Carlo Domenico Cristofori; November 17, 1631; Aviano, Venice
- Died: August 13, 1699 (aged 67); Vienna, Austria
- Venerated in: Catholic Church
- Beatified: 27 April 2003, Saint Peter's Square, Vatican City by Pope John Paul II
- Feast: August 13
- Attributes: Franciscan habit

Mark of Aviano (Italian: Marco d'Aviano), born Carlo Domenico Cristofori (November 17, 1631 – August 13, 1699) was an Italian Capuchin friar. In 2003, he was beatified by Pope John Paul II.

== Life ==
Carlo Domenico Cristofori was born in Aviano, a small community in the Republic of Venice (Italy). Educated at the Jesuit College in Gorizia, at 16 he tried to reach the island of Crete, where the Venetians were at war with the Ottoman Turks, in order to preach the Gospel and convert the Muslims to Christianity. On his way, he sought asylum at a Capuchin convent in Koper, where he was welcomed by the superior, who knew his family, and who, after providing him with food and rest, advised him to return home.

Inspired by his encounter with the Capuchins, he felt that God was calling on him to enter their order. In 1648, he began his novitiate. A year later, he professed his vows and took his father's name, Marco, becoming Fra' Marco d'Aviano. On 18 September 1655, he was ordained a priest in Chioggia. His ministry entered a new phase in 1664, when he received a licence to preach throughout the Republic of Venice and other Italian states, particularly during Advent and Lent. He was also given more responsibility when he was elected superior of the convents of Belluno in 1672, and Oderzo in 1674.

His life took an unexpected turn in 1676, when he gave his blessing to a nun, bedridden for some 13 years: she was miraculously healed. The news spread far and wide, and it was not long before the sick, and many others from all social strata, began to seek him out.

Among those who sought his help was Leopold I, Holy Roman Emperor, whose wife had been unable to conceive a male heir. From 1680 to the end of his life, Marco d'Aviano became a close confidant and adviser to him. As the danger of war with the Ottoman Turks grew near, Marco d'Aviano was appointed by Pope Innocent XI as his personal envoy to the emperor. An impassioned preacher and a skillful mediator, Marco d'Aviano played a crucial role in resolving disputes, restoring unity, and energizing the armies of the Holy League, which included Austria, Poland, and Venice, under the leadership of the Polish king Jan III Sobieski. In the decisive Battle of Vienna (1683), the Holy League succeeded in inflicting a defeat on the invading Ottoman Turks.

From 1683 to 1689, Marco participated in the military campaigns, playing a crucial role in promoting good relations within the Imperial army and encouraging the soldiers. He was present at the liberation of Buda in 1686 and at the siege of Belgrade in 1688. He always maintained a strictly religious spirit, to which any violence and cruelty were repugnant. As a result, at the siege of Belgrade several hundred Muslim soldiers successfully appealed to him personally, in order to avoid being massacred upon capture.

With the campaigns over, Marco returned to pastoral work. In one of his private letters to the emperor, Marco actually scolds him quite forcefully for granting a benefit to one of his brothers, reminding him that, by so doing, he was only providing ammunition for the enemies of their cause.

Marco d'Aviano died of cancer on August 13, 1699, in Vienna. He is buried in the Capuchin Church, in whose vault the Habsburg emperors are buried.

== Veneration ==
Marco's cause was formally opened on 11 December 1912, granting him the title of Servant of God. He was later declared Venerable. Usually he is depicted in the act of preaching.

== Honorary protection ==
Notable people who are baptised under protection of Marcus are:

- Archduke Anton Karl Ludwig Georg Felix Marcus d'Aviano of Habsburg Lothringen.
- Archduchess Adelheid Maria Josefa Sixta Antonia Roberta Ottonia Zita Charlotte Luise Immaculata Pia Theresia Beatrix Franciska Isabelle Henriette Maximiliana Genoveva Ignatia Marcus d'Aviano of Austria.
- Archduke Felix Friedrich August Maria vom Siege Franz Joseph Peter Karl Anton Robert Otto Pius Michael Benedikt Sebastian Ignatius Marcus d'Aviano, Erzherzog von Österreich)
- Carlos Felipe María Otón Lucas Marcos de Aviano Melchor de Habsburgo-Lorena y Arenberg
- Archduke Karl Ludwig Maria Franz Joseph Michael Gabriel Antonius Robert Stephan Pius Gregor Ignatius Markus d'Aviano of Habsburg-Lothringen
- Archduke Carl Christian Maria Anna Rudolph Anton Marcus d'Aviano of Austria.
- Archduke Imre Emanuel Simeon Jean Carl Marcus d'Aviano of Austria
- Archduke Christoph Henri Alexander Maria Marcus d'Aviano of Austria
- Archduke Alexander Hector Marie Karl Leopold Marcus d'Aviano of Austria
- Archduke Rudolf Syringus Peter Karl Franz Joseph Robert Otto Antonius Maria Pius Benedikt Ignatius Laurentius Justiniani Marcus d'Aviano von Habsburg-Lothringen.
- Archduke Joannes Carlos Luis Clemente María José de Aviano Leopoldo de Habsburgo-Lorena (1962-1975)
- Archduchess Elisabeth Charlotte Alfonsa Christina Theresia Antonia Josefa Roberta Ottonia Francisca Isabelle Pia Marcus d'Aviano van Oostenrijk
- Archduke Lorenz Otto Carl Amadeus Thadeus Maria Pius Andreas Marcus d'Aviano
- Archduke Amedeo Maria Joseph Carl Pierre Philippe Paola Marcus d'Aviano of Austria.
- Archduke Joachim Carl Maria Nikolaus Isabelle Marcus d'Aviano of Austria.
- Grand duke Jean Benoît Guillaume Robert Antoine Louis Marie Adolphe Marc d'Aviano of Luxembourg.
- Prince Constantin Jean Philippe Marie Albert Marc d'Aviano of Nassau.
- Prince Wenceslas François Baudoin Léopold Juraj Marie Marc d'Aviano of Nassau.
- Prince Jean André Guillaume Marie Gabriel Marc d'Aviano of Nassau.
- Prince Joachim Maria Nikolaus Isabelle Marcus d'Aviano of Belgium.
- Prince Carl-Johan Félix Julien Marc d'Aviano of Nassau.

== Media ==
In the 2012 Polish and Italian historical drama film The Day of the Siege: September Eleven 1683 about the Battle of Vienna, Marco d'Aviano is portrayed by F. Murray Abraham.

== Trivia ==
A popular myth says that cappuccino was named after him. According to legend, after the Battle of Vienna, "the Viennese reportedly found sacks of coffee abandoned by the enemy and, finding it too strong for their taste, diluted it with cream and honey. The drink being of a brown colour like that of the Capuchins' robes, the Viennese named it cappuccino in honour of Marco D'Aviano's order."
