= List of people beatified by Pope John Paul II =

Pope John Paul II beatified 1,344 people. The names listed below are from the Holy See website and are listed by year, then date. The locations given are the locations of the beatification ceremonies, and not necessarily the birthplaces or homelands of the beatified. As of July 2025, 199 would be subsequently canonized, of which Pope John Paul II himself presided over the canonizations of 96 of these same individuals. All of the beatifications listed have taken place within St. Peter's Square or St. Peter's Basilica, unless stated otherwise.

== January ==
=== 25 January 1983 at the Basilica of Saint Paul Outside the Walls in Rome, Italy ===
- Maria Gabriella Sagheddu (1914–1939)

=== 17 January 1995 at the Sir John Guise Stadium in Port Moresby, Papua New Guinea ===
- Peter To Rot (1912–1945) (canonized in 19 October 2025)

=== 19 January 1995 at the Randwick Racecourse in Sydney, Australia ===
- Mary MacKillop (1842–1909) (canonized on 17 October 2010)

=== 21 January 1995 at the Galle Face Green in Colombo, Sri Lanka ===
- Joseph Vaz (1651–1711) (canonized on 14 January 2015)

=== 29 January 1995 ===
- Domenico Mazzarella (1802–1854)
- Grimoaldo Santamaria (1883–1902)
- Rafael Guízar Valencia (1878–1938) (canonized on 15 October 2006)
- Genoveva Torres Morales (1870–1956) (canonized on 4 May 2003)

== February ==
=== 24 February 1979 (confirmation of cult) at the Apostolic Palace ===
- Margareta Ebner (ca. 1291–1351)

=== 18 February 1981 at Rizal Park in Manila, Philippines ===
- 16 Martyrs of Japan (+1633–1637) (canonized on 18 October 1987)

=== 19 February 1984 ===
- Giovanni Battista Mazzucconi (1826–1855)
- Guillaume Repin & 98 Companions (+1794)

=== 1 February 1985 in Guayaquil, Ecuador ===
- Mercedes de Jesús Molina (1828–1883)

=== 2 February 1985 in Arequipa, Peru ===
- Ana de los Angeles Monteagudo (1602–1686)

=== 8 February 1986 at the Nahru Stadium in Kottayam, India ===
- Kuriakose Elias Chavara (1805–1871) (canonized on 23 November 2014)
- Alphonsa Muttathupadathu (1910–1946) (canonized on 12 October 2008)

== March ==
=== 29 March 1987 ===
- Emmanuel Domingo y Sol (1836–1909)
- María Pilar Martínez García & 2 Companions (+1936)
- Marcelo Spinola y Maestre (1835–1906)

=== 20 March 1993 ===
- Dina Bélanger (1897–1929)
- Duns Scotus (c. 1266–1308) (cult confirmed on 6 July 1991)

=== 17 March 1996 ===
- Daniel Comboni (1831–1881) (canonized on 5 October 2003)
- Guido Maria Conforti (1865–1931) (canonized on 23 October 2011)

=== 15 March 1998 ===
- Brigida Morello Zancano (1610–1679)
- Carmen Sallés y Barangueras (1848–1911) (canonized on 21 October 2012)
- Eugene Bossilkov (1900–1952)

=== 22 March 1998 at Oba, Nigeria ===
- Cyprian Iwene Tansi (1903–1964)

=== 7 March 1999 ===
- Anna Schäffer (1882–1925) (canonized on 21 October 2012)
- Nicholas Barré (1621–1686)
- Vicente Soler Munárriz & 7 Companions (+1936)

=== 5 March 2000 ===
- Andrew of Phu Yen (1624–1644)
- Nicholas Bunkerd Kitbamrung (1895–1944)
- Blessed Martyrs of Nowogródek (+1943)
- Martyrs of Natal (+1645) (canonized on 15 October 2017)
- Pedro Calungsod (1654–1672) (canonized on 21 October 2012)

=== 11 March 2001 ===
- 233 Spanish Martyrs (+1936–1939)

=== 23 March 2003 ===
- László Batthyány-Strattmann (1870–1931)
- Maria Josefa Karolina Brader (1860–1943)
- Pierre Bonhomme (1806–1861)
- Juana María Condesa Lluch (1862–1916)
- María Dolores Rodríguez Sopeña (1848–1918)

=== 21 March 2004 ===
- Maria Candida of the Eucharist (1884–1949)
- Tomasa Ortiz Real (1842–1916)
- Matilde of the Sacred Heart (1841–1902)
- Luigi Talamoni (1848–1926)

== April ==
=== 29 April 1979 ===
- Francisco Coll Guitart (1812–1875) (canonized on 11 October 2009)
- Jacques-Désiré Laval (1803–1864)

=== 14 April 1985 ===
- Pauline Mallinckrodt (1817–1881)
- Maria Caterina Troiani (1813–1887)

=== 3 April 1987 at the O'Higgins Park in Santiago, Chile ===
- Teresa of Los Andes (1900–1920) (canonized on 21 March 1993)

=== 17 April 1988 ===
- Giovanni Calabria (1873–1954) (canonized on 18 April 1999)
- Giuseppe Nascimbeni (1851–1922)

=== 24 April 1988 ===
- Pietro Bonilli (1841–1935)
- Francisco Palau (1811–1872)
- Savina Petrilli (1851–1923)
- Kaspar Stanggassinger (1871–1899)

=== 23 April 1989 ===
- Maria Anna Rosa Caiani (1863–1921)
- Martin Lumbreras Peralta (1598–1632)
- Melchor Sánchez Pérez (1599–1632)
- Franciszka Siedliska (1842–1902)
- Catherine of St. Augustine (1632–1668)

=== 30 April 1989 in Antananarivo, Madagascar ===
- Victoire Rasoamanarivo (1828–1894)

=== 9 April 1990 (confirmation of cult) at the Apostolic Palace ===
- Juan Diego (1474–1548) (later solemnized on 9 April 1990, canonized on 31 July 2002)

=== 29 April 1990 ===
- Filippo Rinaldi (1856–1931)
- Martyrs of Turon (+1934) (canonized on 21 November 1999)
- Innocencio of Mary Immaculate (1887–1934) (canonized on 21 November 1999)
- Maria Mercedes Prat (1890–1936)
- Jaime Hilario Barbal (1898–1937) (canonized on 21 November 1999)

=== 21 April 1991 ===
- Annunciata Astoria Cocchetti (1800–1882)
- Dina Bosatta (1858–1887)
- Marie Thérèse Haze (1782–1876)

=== 18 April 1993 ===
- Ludovico of Casoria (1814–1885) (canonized on 23 November 2014)
- Angela Truszkowska (1825–1899)
- Mary Faustina Kowalska (1905–1938) (canonized on 30 April 2000)
- Stanisław Kazimierczyk (1433–1489) (cult confirmed on 21 December 1992, canonized on 17 October 2010)
- Paula Montal Fornés (1799–1889) (canonized on 25 November 2001)

=== 24 April 1994 ===
- Gianna Beretta Molla (1922–1962) (canonized on 16 May 2004)
- Elisabeth Canori Mora (1774–1825)
- Isidore Bakanja (ca. 1887–1909)

=== 30 April 1995 in Trento, Italy ===
- Johann Nepomuk von Tschiderer zu Gleifheim (1777–1860)

=== 9 April 2000 ===
- Elizabeth Hesselblad (1870–1957) (canonized on 5 June 2016)
- Francis Xavier Seelos (1819–1867)
- Maria Theresa Chiramel (1876–1926) (canonized on 13 October 2019)
- Mariano de Jesús Euse Hoyos (1845–1926)
- Rosa Maria Benedetta Gattorno Custo (1831–1900)

=== 29 April 2001 ===
- Manuel González y García (1877–1940) (canonized on 16 October 2016)
- Marie Anne Blondin (1809–1890)
- Caterina Cittadini (1801–1857) (canonized on 26 April 2009)
- Caterina Volpicelli (1839–1894)
- Carlos Manuel Rodríguez Santiago (1918–1963)

=== 14 April 2002 ===
- María del Tránsito Cabanillas (1821–1885)
- Gaetano Errico (1791–1860) (canonized on 12 October 2008)
- Lodovico Pavoni (1784–1849) (canonized on 16 October 2016)
- Maria Romero Meneses (1902–1977)
- Luigi Variara (1875–1923)
- Artémides Zatti (1880–1951) (canonized on 9 October 2022)

=== 27 April 2003 ===
- James Alberione (1884–1971)
- Marco d'Aviano (1631–1699)
- Maria Cristina of the Immaculate Conception (1856–1906) (canonized on 17 May 2015)
- Maria Domenica Mantovani (1862–1934) (canonized on 15 May 2022)
- Eugenia Maria Ravasco (1845–1900)
- Giulia Salzano (1846–1929) (canonized on 17 October 2010)

=== 25 April 2004 ===
- August Czartoryski (1858–1893)
- Alexandrina Maria da Costa (1904–1955)
- María Guadalupe García Zavala (1878–1963) (canonized on 12 May 2013)
- Laura of Saint Catherine of Siena (1874–1949) (canonized on 12 May 2013)
- Eusebia Palomino Yenes (1899–1935)
- Giulia Valle (1847–1916)

== May ==
=== 31 May 1979 (concession of Mass) at the Apostolic Palace ===
- Jadwiga of Poland (1374–1399) (canonized on 8 June 1997)

=== 23 May 1982 ===
- André Bessette (1845–1937) (canonized on 17 October 2010)
- Maria Angela Astorch (1592–1665)
- Anne-Marie Rivier (1768–1838) (canonized on 15 May 2022)
- Marie Rose Durocher (1811–1849)
- Peter Donders (1807–1887)

=== 15 May 1983 ===
- Luigi Versiglia (1873–1930) (canonized on 1 October 2000)
- Callistus Caravario (1903–1930) (canonized on 1 October 2000)

=== 1 May 1987 at the Stadion Köln-Müngersdorf in Cologne, Germany ===
- Edith Stein (1891–1942) (canonized on 11 October 1998)

=== 3 May 1987 at the Münchener Olympiastadion in Munich, Germany ===
- Rupert Mayer (1876–1945)

=== 10 May 1987 ===
- Andrea Carlo Ferrari (1850–1921)
- Pierre-François Jamet (1762–1845)
- Louis-Zéphirin Moreau (1824–1901)
- Benedetta Cambiagio Frassinello (1791–1858) (canonized on 19 May 2002)

=== 2 May 1989 at Saint Denis in Réunion ===
- Jean-Bernard Rousseau (1797–1867)

=== 6 May 1990 at the Basilica of Our Lady of Guadalupe in Mexico City, Mexico ===
- Jose Maria de Yermo y Parres (1851–1904) (canonized on 21 May 2000)
- Juan Diego (1474–1548) (cult confirmed on 9 April 1990, canonized on 31 July 2002)
- Cristobal, Antonio and Juan (+1527–1529) (canonized on 15 October 2017)

=== 20 May 1990 ===
- Pier Giorgio Frassati (1901–1925) (canonized on 7 September 2025)

=== 17 May 1992 ===
- Josephine Bakhita (ca. 1869–1947) (canonized on 1 October 2000)
- Josemaría Escrivá (1902–1975) (canonized on 6 October 2002)

=== 16 May 1993 ===
- Marie Louise Trichet (1684–1759)
- Florida Cevoli (1685–1767)
- Colomba Matylda Gabriel (1858–1926)
- Maurice Tornay (1910–1949)

=== 7 May 1995 ===
- Agostino Roscelli (1818–1902) (canonized on 10 June 2001)
- Maria Domenica Brun Barbantini (1789–1868)
- Helena Stollenwerk (1852–1900)
- Giuseppina Gabriela Bonino (1843–1906)
- Laura Evangelista Alvarado Cardozo (1875–1967)

=== 12 May 1996 ===
- Alfredo Ildefonso Schuster (1880–1954)
- Candida Maria of Jesus (1845–1912) (canonized on 17 October 2010)
- Filippo Smaldone (1848–1923) (canonized on 15 October 2006)
- Januarius Maria Sarnelli (1702–1744)
- María Antonia Bandrés Elósegui (1898–1919)
- Maria Raffaella Cimatti (1861–1945)

=== 4 May 1997 ===
- Ceferino Giménez Malla (1861–1936)
- Enrico Rebuschini (1860–1938)
- Florentino Asensio Barroso (1877–1936)
- Gaetano Catanoso (1879–1963) (canonized on 23 October 2005)
- Maria Vicenta Rosal (1820–1886)

=== 10 May 1998 ===
- Rita Josefa Pujalte Sánchez (1853–1936)
- Francisca Aldea Araujo (1881–1936)
- María Sagrario Moragas Cantarero (1881–1936)
- María Gabriela Hinojosa Naveros & 6 Companions (+1936)
- María de las Maravillas de Jesús (1891–1974) (canonized on 4 May 2003)
- Nimattullah Kassab (1808–1858) (canonized on 16 May 2004)

=== 23 May 1998 in Vercelli, Italy ===
- Secondo Pollo (1908–1941)

=== 24 May 1998 in Turin, Italy ===
- Giovanni Maria Boccardo (1848–1913)
- Teresa Grillo Michel (1855–1944)
- Teresa Bracco (1924–1944)

=== 2 May 1999 ===
- Pio of Pietrelcina (1887–1968) (canonized on 16 June 2002)

=== 13 May 2000 at the Basilica of Our Lady of the Rosary in Fatima, Portugal ===
- Francisco Marto (1908–1919) (canonized on 13 May 2017)
- Jacinta Marto (1910–1920) (canonized on 13 May 2017)

=== 9 May 2001 at the "Granaries" of Floriana in Malta ===
- George Preca (1880–1962) (canonized on 3 June 2007)
- Nazju Falzon (1813–1865)
- Maria Adeodata Pisani (1806–1855)

=== 26 May 2002 at the Central Plaza in Plovdiv, Bulgaria ===
- Kamen Vitchev (1893–1952)
- Pavel Djidjov (1919–1952)
- Josaphat Chichkov (1884–1952)

== June ==
=== 22 June 1980 ===
- Kateri Tekakwitha (1656–1680) (canonized on 21 October 2012)
- François de Montmorency-Laval (1623–1708) (canonized on 3 April 2014)
- José de Anchieta (1534–1597) (canonized on 3 April 2014)
- Marie Guyart of the Incarnation (1599–1672) (canonized on 3 April 2014)
- Peter of Saint Joseph Betancur (1626–1667) (canonized on 30 July 2002)

=== 20 June 1983 in Poznań, Poland ===
- Ursula Ledóchowska (1865–1939) (canonized on 18 May 2003)

=== 22 June 1983 in Krakow, Poland ===
- Raphael Kalinowski (1835–1907) (canonized on 17 November 1991)
- Albert Chmielowski (1845–1916) (canonized on 12 November 1989)

=== 23 June 1985 ===
- Benedict Menni (1841–1914) (canonized on 21 November 1999)
- Peter Friedhofen (1819–1860)

=== 10 June 1987 in Tarnow, Poland ===
- Karolina Kózka (1898–1914)

=== 14 June 1987 in Wielkopolskie, Poland ===
- Michał Kozal (1893–1943)

=== 28 June 1987 ===
- Jurgis Matulaitis-Matulevičius (1871–1927)

=== 18 June 1989 ===
- Antonio Lucci (1681–1752)
- Maria Elisabetta Renzi (1786–1859)

=== 2 June 1991 in Rzeszów, Poland ===
- Józef Sebastian Pelczar (1842–1924) (canonized on 18 May 2003)

=== 5 June 1991 at the Aeroclub of Bialystok in Bialystok, Poland ===
- Bolesława Lament (1862–1946)

=== 9 June 1991 at the Plaza of Agricola Park in Warsaw, Poland ===
- Melchor Chyliński (1694–1741)

=== 21 June 1992 at the Shrine of Our Lady of the Fountain in Bergamo, Italy ===
- Francesco Spinelli (1853–1913) (canonized on 14 October 2018)

=== 4 June 1995 at the Basilica of the Sacred Heart in Brussels, Belgium ===
- Damien De Veuster (1840–1889) (canonized on 11 October 2009)

=== 23 June 1996 at the Olympic Stadium in Berlin, Germany ===
- Bernhard Lichtenberg (1875–1943)
- Karl Leisner (1915–1945)

=== 6 June 1997 in Zakopane, Poland ===
- Bernardyna Maria Jabłońska (1878–1940)
- Maria Karłowska (1865–1935)

=== 21 June 1998 ===
- Anton Maria Schwartz (1852–1929)
- Franz Alexander Kern (1897–1924)
- Maria Restituta Kafka (1894–1943)

=== 7 June 1999 in Torun, Poland ===
- Stefan Wincenty Frelichowski (1913–1945)

=== 13 June 1999 in Warsaw, Poland ===
- Edmund Bojanowski (1814–1871)
- Regina Protmann (1552–1613)
- 108 Martyrs of World War II (+1939–1945)

=== 26 June 2001 at the Lviv Hippodrome in Lviv, Ukraine ===
- Józef Bilczewski (1860–1923) (canonized on 23 October 2005)
- Zygmunt Gorazdowski (1845–1920) (canonized on 23 October 2005)

=== 27 June 2001 at the Lviv Hippodrome in Lviv, Ukraine ===
- Omelyan Kovch (1884–1944)
- Theodore Romzha (1911–1947)
- Nicholas Charnetsky & 24 Companions (+1935–1973)
- Josaphata Hordashevska (1869–1919)

=== 6 June 2003 at Harbor Square in Dubrovnik, Croatia ===
- Marija Petković (1892–1966)

=== 22 June 2003 at Petričevać Hill near Banja Luka in Bosnia and Herzegovina ===
- Ivan Merz (1896–1928)

== July ==
=== 4 July 1987 (concession of Mass and Office) at the Apostolic Palace ===
Approved for veneration for the Sovereign Order of Malta

- Gerardo Sasso (c. 1040–1120)
- Pietro Pattarini d'Imola (c. 1250–1320)
- Gerlando d'Alemagna (+1271)
- Nicasius of Sicily (1135–1187)
- Ubaldesca Taccini (1136–1206)
- Ugo Canefri (1186–1233)
- Toscana da Verona (1280–1344)
- Fleur de Beaulieu (c. 1300–1347)

=== 6 July 1991 (confirmation of cult) at the Apostolic Palace ===
- John Duns Scotus (c. 1265 - 1308) (later solemnized on 20 March 1993)

=== 14 July 1991 at Aosta Valley in Susa, Italy ===
- Edoardo Giuseppe Rosaz (1830–1903)

== August ==
=== 15 August 1985 in Kinshasa, Democratic Republic of the Congo ===
- Marie-Clémentine Anuarite Nengapeta (1939–1964)

=== 13 August 1991 ===
- Angela Salawa (1881–1922)

=== 22 August 1997 in the Cathedral of Notre-Dame de Paris in Paris, France ===
- Frédéric Ozanam (1813–1853)

=== 1 August 2002 at the Basilica of Our Lady of Guadalupe in Mexico City, Mexico ===
- Juan Bautista and Jacinto de los Ángeles (c. 1660–1700)

=== 18 August 2002 at Błonie Park in Kraków, Poland ===
- Jan Wojciech Balicki (1869–1948)
- Jan Beyzym (1850–1912)
- Zygmunt Szczęsny Feliński (1822–1895) (canonized on 11 October 2009)
- Janina Szymkowiak (1910–1942)

== September ==
=== 11 September 1984 at Jarry Park in Montreal, Canada ===
- Marie-Léonie Paradis (1840–1912) (canonized on 20 October 2024)

=== 30 September 1984 ===
- Clemente Marchisio (1833–1903)
- Federico Albert (1820–1876)
- Isidore of Saint Joseph (1881–1916)
- Rafaela Ybarra de Vilallonga (1843–1900)

=== 22 September 1985 ===
- Virginia Centurione Bracelli (1587–1651) (canonized on 18 May 2003)

=== 3 September 1988 ===
- Laura Vicuña (1891–1904)

=== 15 September 1988 at the Maseru Race Course in Maseru, Lesotho ===
- Joseph Gérard (1831–1904)

=== 25 September 1988 ===
- Frédéric Janssoone (1838–1916)
- Josefa Naval Girbés (1820–1893)
- Giuseppe Benedetto Dusmet (1818–1894)
- Francesco Faà di Bruno (1825–1888)
- Miguel Agustín Pro (1891–1927)
- Junipero Serra (1713–1784) (canonized on 23 September 2015)

=== 27 September 1992 ===
- Irish Catholic Martyrs (+1584–1654)
- Rafael Arnáiz Barón (1911–1938) (canonized on 11 October 2009)
- Ignacia Nazaria March Mesa (1889–1943) (canonized on 14 October 2018)
- María Josefa Sancho de Guerra (1842–1912) (canonized on 1 October 2000)
- Leonie Aviat (1844–1914) (canonized on 25 November 2001)

=== 28 September 1993 in Asti, Italy ===
- Giuseppe Marello (1844–1895) (canonized on 25 November 2001)

=== 27 September 1997 in Bologna, Italy ===
- Bartolomeo Maria Dal Monte (1726–1778)

=== 20 September 1998 in Brescia, Italy ===
- Giuseppe Tovini (1841–1897)

=== 19 September 1999 in Maribor, Slovenia ===
- Anton Martin Slomšek (1800–1862)

=== 3 September 2000 ===
- Columba Marmion (1858–1923)
- Tommaso Reggio (1818–1901)
- William Joseph Chaminade (1761–1850)
- Pope Pius IX (1792–1878)
- Pope John XXIII (1881–1963) (canonized on 27 April 2014)

=== 14 September 2003 at Petržalka Square in Bratislava, Slovakia ===
- Basil Hopko (1904–1976)
- Cecília Schelingová (1916–1955)

=== 5 September 2004 at the Esplanade of Montorso in Loreto, Italy ===
- Pere Tarrés i Claret (1905–1950)
- Alberto Marvelli (1918–1946)
- Giuseppina Suriano (1915–1950)

== October ==
=== 14 October 1979 ===
- Enrique de Ossó y Cercelló (1840–1896) (canonized on 16 June 1993)

=== 26 October 1980 ===
- Bartolo Longo (1841–1926) (canonized in 2025)
- Luigi Orione (1872–1940) (canonized on 16 May 2004)
- Maria Anna Sala (1829–1891)

=== 4 October 1981 ===
- Alain de Solminihac (1593–1659)
- Maria Repetto (1807–1890)
- Richard Pampuri (1897–1930) (canonized on 1 November 1989)
- Claudine Thévenet (1774–1837) (canonized on 21 March 1993)
- Luigi Scrosoppi (1804–1884) (canonized on 10 June 2001)

=== 3 October 1982 ===
- Giovanni da Fiesole (Fra Angelico) (c. 1395–1455)
- Jeanne Jugan (1792–1879) (canonized on 11 October 2009)
- Salvatore Lilli & 7 Companions (+1895)

=== 30 October 1983 ===
- Domingo Iturrate (1901–1927)
- Giacomo Cusmano (1834–1888)
- Jeremiah of Wallachia (1556–1625)

=== 6 October 1985 ===
- Diego Luis de San Vitores (1627–1672)
- Francisco Gárate Aranguren (1857–1929)
- Jose Maria Rubio (1864–1929) (canonized on 4 May 2003)

=== 4 October 1986 in Lyon, France ===
- Antoine Chevrier (1825–1879)

=== 19 October 1986 in Florence, Italy ===
- Teresa Maria Manetti (1846–1910)

=== 4 October 1987 ===
- Marcel Callo (1921–1945)
- Antonia Mesina (1919–1935)
- Pierina Morosini (1931–1957)

=== 16 October 1988 ===
- Honorat Koźmiński (1829–1916)
- Bernard Mary of Jesus (1831–1911)
- Charles of Mount Argus (1821–1893) (canonized on 3 June 2007)

=== 23 October 1988 ===
- Nicolas Steno (1638–1686)

=== 1 October 1989 ===
- Francinaina Cirer Carbonell (1781–1855)
- Geltrude Comensoli (1847–1903) (canonized on 26 April 2009)
- Lorenzo Maria of Saint Francis Xavier (1782–1856)
- Martyrs of Daimiel (+1936)

=== 22 October 1989 ===
- Marie Deluil-Martiny (1841–1884)
- Giuseppe Giaccardo (1896–1948)
- Aknaet Phila and 6 Companions (+1940)

=== 31 October 1989 ===
- Giuseppe Baldo (1843–1915)

=== 7 October 1990 ===
- Giuseppe Allamano (1851–1926) (canonized on 20 October 2024)
- Annibale Maria di Francia (1851–1927) (canonized on 16 May 2004)

=== 18 October 1991 at Florianópolis in Santa Catarina, Brazil ===
- Pauline of the Agonizing Heart of Jesus (1865–1942) (canonized on 19 May 2002)

=== 27 October 1991 ===
- Adolf Kolping (1813–1865)

=== 25 October 1992 ===
- Felipe de Jesús Munárriz Azcona & 50 Companions (+1936)
- Braulio María Corres Díaz de Cerio & 70 Companions (+1936)
- Narcisa de Jesús (1832–1869) (canonized on 12 October 2008)

=== 10 October 1993 ===
- Elisabetta Maria Satellico (1706–1745)
- Maria Francesca Rubatto (1844–1904) (canonized on 15 May 2022)
- Victoria Díez Bustos de Molina (1903–1936)
- Diego Ventaja Milán & 8 Companions (+1936)
- Pedro Poveda Castroverde (1874–1936) (canonized on 4 May 2003)

=== 16 October 1994 ===
- María Rafols Bruna (1781–1853)
- Ana Petra Pérez Florido (1845–1906)
- Giuditta Vannini (1859–1911) (canonized on 13 October 2019)
- Alberto Hurtado (1901–1952) (canonized on 23 October 2005)
- Nicolas Roland (1642–1678)

=== 1 October 1995 ===
- Pietro Casani (1570–1647)
- Jean-Baptiste Souzy & 63 Companions (+1794–1795)
- Carlos Eraña Guruceta & 2 Companions (+1936)
- Dionisio Pamplona Polo & 12 Companions (+1936)
- Pedro Ruiz de los Paños Ángel & 8 Companions (+1936)
- Ángeles Lloret Martí & 16 Companions (+1936)
- Vicente Vilar David (1889–1937)
- Anselmo Polanco Fontecha (1881–1939)
- Felipe Ripoll Morata (1878–1939)

=== 29 October 1995 ===
- Marguerite Bays (1815–1879) (canonized on 13 October 2019)
- Anna Maria Katherina Scherer (1825–1888)
- Maria Bernarda Bütler (1848–1924) (canonized on 12 October 2008)

=== 6 October 1996 ===
- Edmund Ignatius Rice (1762–1844)
- Wincenty Lewoniuk and 12 Companions (+1874)
- Peregrina Mogas Fontcuberta (1827–1886)
- Marcelina Darowska (1827–1911)

=== 12 October 1997 ===
- Domenico Lentini (1770–1828)
- Émilie d'Oultremont (1818–1878)
- Giovanni Battista Piamarta (1841–1913)
- Maria Giovanna Fasce (1881–1947)
- Mateo Elías Nieves Castillo (1882–1928)

=== 3 October 1998 at the Shrine of Marija Bistrica in Croatia ===
- Aloysius Stepinac (1898–1960)

=== 25 October 1998 ===
- Anthony of St. Ann Galvão (1739–1822) (canonized on 11 May 2007)
- Manuel Míguez González (1831–1925) (canonized on 15 October 2017)
- Théodore Guérin (1798–1856) (canonized on 15 October 2006)
- Zefirino Agostini (1813–1896)

=== 3 October 1999 ===
- Arcangelo Tadini (1846–1912) (canonized on 26 April 2009)
- Edward Poppe (1890–1924)
- Ferdinando Maria Baccilieri (1821–1893)
- Giuseppe Oddi (1839–1919)
- Mariano da Roccacasale (1778–1866)
- Nicola da Gesturi (1882–1958)

=== 7 October 2001 ===
- Ignatius Maloyan (1869–1915) (canonized on 19 October 2025)
- Nikolaus Gross (1898–1945)
- Alfonso Maria Fusco (1839–1910) (canonized on 16 October 2016)
- Tommaso Maria Fusco (1831–1891)
- Émilie Gamelin (1800–1851)
- Maria Angela Picco (1867–1921)
- Euthymia Üffing (1914–1955)

=== 21 October 2001 ===
- Luigi Beltrame Quattrocchi (1880–1951)
- Maria C. Beltrame Quattrocchi (1884–1965)

=== 20 October 2002 ===
- Mary of the Passion (1839–1904)
- Marcantonio Durando (1801–1880)
- Giacinto Longhin (1863–1936)
- Elisa Angela Meneguzzi (1901–1941)
- Daudi Okelo (ca. 1900–1918)
- Jildo Irwa (ca. 1906–1918)

=== 19 October 2003 ===
- Teresa of Calcutta (1910–1997) (canonized on 4 September 2016)

=== 3 October 2004 ===
- Pierre-Joseph Cassant (1878–1903)
- Antonina De Angelis (1880–1962)
- Charles I and IV of Austria and Hungary (1887–1922)
- Pierre Vigne (1670–1740)
- Anne Catherine Emmerich (1774–1824)

== November ==
=== 5 November 1982 in Sevilla, Spain ===
- Angela of the Cross (1846–1932) (canonized on 4 May 2003)

=== 13 November 1983 ===
- Mariam Baouardy (1846–1878) (canonized on 17 May 2015)

=== 25 November 1984 ===
- Daniel Brottier (1876–1936)
- Elizabeth of the Trinity (1880–1906) (canonized on 16 October 2016)
- Josep Manyanet i Vives (1833–1901) (canonized on 16 May 2004)

=== 3 November 1985 ===
- Titus Brandsma (1881–1942) (canonized on 15 May 2022)

=== 16 November 1985 ===
- Rafqa Pietra Choboq Ar-Rayès (1832–1914) (canonized on 10 June 2001)

=== 17 November 1985 ===
- Karolina Gerhardinger (1797–1879)
- Pius of Saint Aloysius (1868–1889)

=== 1 November 1987 ===
- Blandine Merten (1883–1918)
- Ulrika Nisch (1882–1913)
- Julian-Nicolas Rèche (1838–1890)

=== 22 November 1987 ===
- Eighty-five martyrs of England and Wales (+1584–1678)

=== 20 November 1988 ===
- Johannes Laurentius Weiss & 2 Companions (+1716)
- Katharine Drexel (1858–1955) (canonized on 1 October 2000)

=== 4 November 1990 ===
- Aimée-Adèle Le Bouteiller (1816–1883)
- Elisabetta Vendramini (1790–1860)
- Louise-Thérèse de Montaignac de Chauvance (1820–1885)
- Maria Schininà (1844–1910)

=== 22 November 1992 ===
- Martyrs of the Cristero War (+1915–1937) (canonized on 21 May 2000)
- María Natividad Venegas de la Torre (1868–1959) (canonized on 21 May 2000)

=== 5 November 1994 in Catania, Italy ===
- Maddalena Caterina Morano (1847–1908)

=== 20 November 1994 ===
- Agnes Galand (1602–1634)
- Marie Poussepin (1653–1744)
- Eugénie Joubert (1876–1904)
- Hyacinthe-Marie Cormier (1832–1916)
- Claudio Granzotto (1900–1947)

=== 24 November 1996 ===
- Catherine Jarrige (1754–1836)
- Jakob Gapp (1897–1943)
- Otto Neururer (1882–1940)

=== 9 November 1997 ===
- Giovanni Battista Scalabrini (1839–1905) (canonized on 9 October 2022)
- Vicenta Chávez Orozco (1867–1949)
- Vilmos Apor (1892–1945)

=== 4 November 2001 ===
- Pavel Peter Gojdič (1888–1960)
- Dominick Trcka (1886–1959)
- Bartholomew of Braga (1514–1590) (canonized on 5 July 2019)
- Giovanni Antonio Farina (1803–1888) (canonized on 23 November 2014)
- Luigi Tezza (1841–1923)
- Paolo Manna (1872–1952)
- Gaetana Sterni (1827–1889)
- Maria Pilar Izquierdo Albero (1906–1945)

=== 9 November 2003 ===
- Luigi Maria Monti (1825–1900)
- Johannes Ludovicus Paquay (1828–1905)
- Juan Nepomuceno Zegrí Moreno (1831–1905)
- Bonifacia Rodríguez y Castro (1837–1905) (canonized on 23 October 2011)
- Rosalie Rendu (1786–1856)

=== 16 November 2004 (confirmation of cult) at the Apostolic Palace ===
- Eusebius of Esztergom (c. 1200–1270) (veneration approved for the Order of Saint Paul the First Hermit)

== December ==
=== 9 December 1980 (concession of Mass and Office) at the Apostolic Palace ===
- Giovanni Saziari (1327–1371)

=== 21 December 1992 (confirmation of cult) at the Apostolic Palace ===
- Stanisław Kazimierczyk (1433–1489) (solemnized on 18 April 1993, canonized on 17 October 2010)

== See also ==
- List of people beatified by Pope John XXIII
- List of people beatified by Pope Paul VI
- List of people beatified by Pope Benedict XVI
- List of people beatified by Pope Francis
- List of people beatified by Pope Leo XIV
