= Mariana Allsopp González-Manrique =

Mexican Catholic religious sister (1854-1933)

Venerable Mariana of the Most Holy Trinity OSsT
- Born: Mariana Allsopp González-Manrique; 24 November 1854; Tepic, Nayarit, Mexico
- Died: 15 March 1933 (aged 78); Madrid, Spain

Mariana of the Most Holy Trinity, OSsT whose given name was Mariana Allsopp González-Manrique (born in Tepic, Mexico on November 24, 1854 – died in Madrid, Spain on March 15, 1933) was a Mexican religious sister in the Roman Catholic Church who co-founded the congregation of the Trinitarian Sisters of Madrid with Francisco de Asís Méndez Casariego.

== Biography ==
=== Childhood and family ===
Mariana at the age of 12

Mariana Allsopp was born in Tepic, Mexico into a wealthy family; her father was an English diplomat and her mother was Spanish. Her mother died in 1862 when she was just 8 years old. Mariana, along with her four siblings, remained under the care of a nanny until 1864 when her father decided to take them to Spain and place them under the care of her mother's family.

As a child, Mariana was educated at the Colegio de Santa Isabel la Real, where she was raised in a courtly environment. Even so, Mariana, from a very young age, felt the call to works of charity for the most needy. She was fond of reading pious books which left her with a desire for a deeper consecration to God.

== Consolidation and expansion of the Institute ==
Mariana as a young adult in Mexico

In 1882 Mariana met Francisco de Asís Méndez Casariego, a canon of Madrid, who had among his objectives the founding of a religious congregation to care for "misguided young women". Mariana felt that this was precisely the vocation to which she was called. Between the two they devised a project that materialized on February 2, 1885, in the Church of the Incarnation, with the creation of the Institute of the Sisters of the Holy Trinity, whose statutes were approved by the Bishop of Madrid in 1888.

The primary mission of the new religious institute, and to which Mariana devoted herself completely, was the protection of women who were the target of prostitution networks, helping them to escape and sheltering them in the institute's homes, where the doors were always kept open, in such a way that those who wanted to seek refuge in them would not find any obstacles. This activity was praised and cited by Pope Francis in his message to the Minister General of the Trinitarians on December 17, 2013: "That is the interest of Christ, and therefore for this reason, the houses of your Family have the 'door always open' for fraternal welcome" (Directory Primitive of the Trinitarian Sisters 2, cf. Evangelii gaudium, 46).

The first house of the foundation was on Calle Obelisco on the outskirts of Madrid, where they set up an ironing, sewing and embroidery workshop, to keep the young women in their care busy. Soon, due to the large number of interested women, the house became too small for them. Despite the difficulties that the sisters had due to the quarrels with the neighbors who did not agree with the lifestyle of the young women, Mariana and her first companions wore the habits of religious sisters on March 18, 1888. Henceforth Mariana would be known as Mariana of the Holy Trinity.

On March 26, 1907, with 73 Trinitarian sisters, Mariana made her perpetual vows, and soon the institute experienced an explosive growth of new foundations that took the sisters across the ocean reaching Argentina and Mexico, the co-founder's homeland. During the anti-religious upsurge that occurred first in Mexico and then in Spain, González-Manrique comforted her spiritual daughters through correspondence, encouraging them never to leave the work to which they had consecrated themselves.

== Death ==
On March 15, 1933, after much arduous work founding new houses and encouraging her sisters, González-Manrique died. Her remains rest next to those of Francisco de Asís Méndez, in the chapel of the congregation's motherhouse.

== Beatification process ==
The diocesan process of beatification began in 1998, ending in the year 2000. It is now in the hands of the Holy See. Mariana Allsopp was declared venerable by Pope Francis on May 21, 2022.

== Bibliography ==
- Alberto Barrios Moneo, Quién es mi prójimo. Francisco de Asís Méndez Casariego..., Madrid, Hermanas Trinitarias, 1981
- José Hernandez Sánchez, Espigando el patrimonio trinitario, Rome, 2001. ISBN 88-900340-2-5.
- Celina Marcos, Sierva de Dios Mariana de la Santísima Trinidad, in Meditaciones Trinitarias, Rome, 2003, pp. 56–59
- Vicente Pereda, Sor Mariana, Fundadora de la Congregación de Hermanas Trinitarias, Madrid, sn, 1958.
- Ignacio Vizcargüenaga Arriortúa,, Carisma y misión de la Orden Trinitaria, Salamanca, Secretariado Trinitario, 2011. ISBN 978-84-96488-47-2
