= Trinitarian (disambiguation) =

Trinitarian commonly refers to ideas or things pertaining to the Trinity.

Trinitarian may also refer to:

- Trinitarianism, a Christian doctrine
- Trinitarian Order, a Roman Catholic mendicant order founded in 1198 by St. John of Matha
- A member of Trinity College, Cambridge
- A member of Trinity College, Oxford
