= Saint Laura (disambiguation) =

Saint Laura of Cordoba (died 864) was a Spanish abbess and martyr.

Saint Laura may also refer to:

- Saint Laura of Constantinople, abbess and martyr
- Laura Montoya (1874–1949), Colombian religious sister known for her work with Indigenous peoples
- Laura Vicuña (1891–1904), Chilean child beatified by the Roman Catholic Church
