= Elisabeth Canori Mora =

Italian Roman Catholic mystic (1774–1825)

Blessed Elisabetta Canori Mora OSST
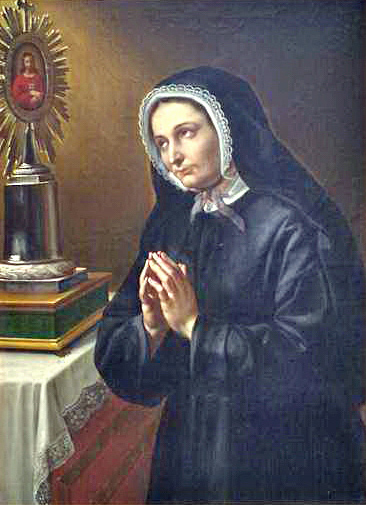
- Born: 21 November 1774; Rome
- Died: 5 February 1825 (aged 50); Rome
- Venerated in: Roman Catholic Church
- Beatified: 24 April 1994, Saint Peter's Square by Pope John Paul II
- Major shrine: San Carlo alle Quattro Fontane, Rome
- Feast: 5 February

Elisabetta Canori Mora (21 November 1774 – 5 February 1825) was an Italian member of the Third Order of the Most Holy Trinity. Mora married an abrasive husband who remained unfaithful and abusive to her but at the time of her death secured his repentance, and he became a priest. Mora had a range of spiritual experiences in which she heard the voice of God and visions of the Madonna and other saints while also experiencing religious ecstasies during her life.

Her beatification cause opened in 1874 under Pope Pius IX and in 1928 was named Venerable under Pope Pius XI. The beatification for Mora was celebrated in Saint Peter's Square under Pope John Paul II in 1994.

== Life ==
Elisabetta Canori Mora was born in Rome on 21 November 1774 to the aristocrats Tommaso Canori and Teresa Primoli as one of twelve children, six of whom died as infants. One sister was Benedetta. She was baptized on 22 November in the names of "Maria Elisabetta Cecilia Gertrude".

Her parents first entrusted her to the religious at the convent of Santa Euphemia for her initial studies and the Superioress Gertrude Riggoli discovered her keen gifts and wanted her there as a full-time student. Canori received her Confirmation in Saint Peter's Basilica on 5 July 1782 and Sister Riggoli was her godmother. Her father withdrew her from the Santa Euphemia convent due to their poorness and soon after sought help from his Spoleto-based brother when their fortunes began to dwindle. Her uncle responded to this and assumed the care of her and her sister Benedetta and entrusted them to a convent for education. The Augustinian Sisters from Casica oversaw her education from 1785 until 1788. During her education she became noted for her intelligence and her interior spirit of penance.

Elisabetta married the successful solicitor Cristoforo Mora (d. 9 September 1845) on 10 January 1796 in the church of Santa Maria in Campo Corleo and the couple went on to have a total of four children. The first two children died within the week of their births, with two surviving daughters Marianne (b. 1799) and Luciana (b. 5 July 1801) left; Marianne later married and had a single child while Luciana became a nun in 1795. Her father-in-law was the doctor Francesco Mora. Her husband proved unfaithful and sometimes violent and reduced the Moras to a state of poorness due to his abrasive nature. Her husband was also jealous and controlling, becoming suspicious of his wife's ties to her parents - this led to him becoming cold and indifferent to her. Cristoforo, at the beginning of their marriage, liked to parade her around and guard her like a treasure and called her his "pearl of great price", though as the marriage deteriorated took up a mistress. Her confessor and spiritual director before 1807 was the Jesuit priest Giovanni Giacomo Pegna.

On 15 August 1801 she fell ill with severe colic despite the attempts of her father-in-law to treat her and almost died but miraculously was cured; there was no medical explanation for her recovery and she deemed it to be a miracle. Her illness caused her to sell her jewels and her wedding dress to make up for the medical bills. Mora - in 1807 - soon became a member of the Secular Trinitarians and her fame spread throughout Rome at a rapid pace. The Trinitarian priest Fernando de San Luis became her spiritual director in 1807 and exposed her to the order before she joined it. Mora predicted that her husband would soon repent to the faith and become devout.

Her husband had reduced them to much poorness to the point that he had stolen a considerable sum from his father, who found out and suffered an apoplectic stroke; he was cured due to Mora's turning to God for His divine intercession. Her sisters-in-law grew concerned for Mora - as did her mother-in-law - and Cristoforo's sisters went to the Roman authorities for the Papal States to have them reprimand him for his vile mannerisms that ran counter to the faith they held dear. The Cardinal Vicar of Rome received him at the convent of Santi Giovanni e Paolo and this enraged Cristoforo when he learnt his sisters were behind it and his wife knew of it. Cristoforo became so enraged with his wife that he pulled out a knife and lunged at her, but did not strike her; he instead fell to his knees and begged for her pardon in a sudden and unexpected moment of fear. Her father-in-law later died on 25 August 1813 which caused her great pain.

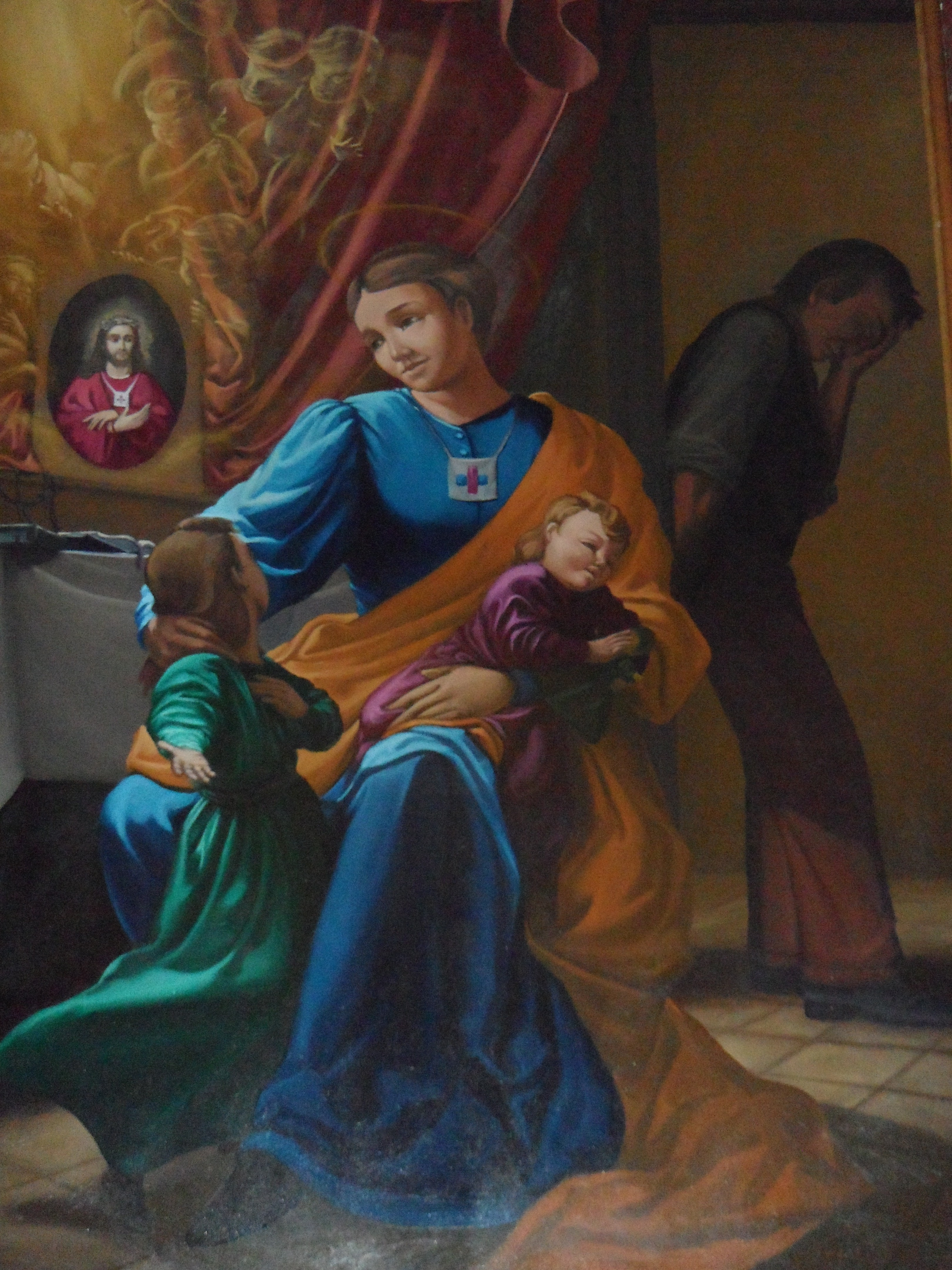
Painting of Elisabetta Canori Mora

Mora recorded all her spiritual experiences at her confessor's request and this ended up spanning countless notebooks. She saw the Madonna on 7 September 1803 with a dove, and this caused her to faint, though she later awoke and saw a flame where her heart was. On 22 March 1814 she turned her mind in reflection to Pope Pius VII and had a sudden vision in which she saw the pontiff in the midst of a pack of "wolves". On 16 January 1815 she had a vision in which she saw angels and on 29 June 1820 saw Saint Peter descend from heaven in papal vestments with a legion of angels behind him. On 19 October 1816 she went to receive Communion and a voice said that God would speak with her on 23 October at midnight - on that date the Madonna appeared with the Infant Jesus and beckoned her to come to them. Mora approached them trembling, and the Infant Jesus placed a ring on her finger. Pius VII at one point suffered a fall with near fatal results and she suffered profound sadness because of this. Mora had an intense devotion to the Eucharist and once saw Felix of Valois and John of Matha appear to her with the Host. It was also said that Mora cured the epileptic Giovanni Maria Mastai-Ferretti - the future Pope Pius IX - before the latter became a priest. This is lesser known, for the future pope credited this to Pius VII when the pair met. In 1820 she was vested in the Trinitarian habit, and assumed the name of "Jane Felica della Santissima Trinità". When she learnt that Pius VII would return from his French exile she - in great happiness - asked God to grant the pope safe passage through to Rome. On 29 September 1809 she saw the Archangel Michael with a legion of angels.

Mora had an intense devotion for Ignatius of Loyola and called him both her "father" and her "protector". She was a friend of Anna Maria Taigi. On 17 June 1814 she returned from church and had a vision in which she saw the late Pope Pius VI who told her that he was in Purgatory for negligences committed in his pontificate. She hurried to tell his confessor who requested her to go five times to the tomb of Pope Pius V and to the tomb of Pudentiana at the church of Santa Pudenziana. God later appeared to Mora and confirmed that Pius VI had gone into heaven.

In late December 1824 she became ill - the death of her mother-in-law on 12 December exacerbated this - and she summoned her daughters to her when she felt that her death was near. Her breathing became slow and deep and on the date of her death, her confessor celebrated Mass and gave her the Eucharist. At 7:00pm she called Luciana to her and requested that she take all of her writings and to give them to her confessor; she confided that she wanted to burn them but would have them given to her confessor out of obedience. Mora died during the evening on 5 February 1825 while her two daughters were caring for her. Her husband Cristoforo arrived too late at her deathbed and wept when he saw her dead in the bed; it was there that he repented and felt great shame for his conduct during their marriage. Her prediction came to fruition, for her husband joined the Trinitarian Order and later became an ordained priest - in the name of "Antonio" - of the Conventual Franciscans in Sezze and died there on 9 September 1845 (he was ordained in 1834). Her remains were interred in the San Carlo alle Quattro Fontane church in Rome. Her nun daughter became the Superioress of the Oblate Nuns of Saint Philip Neri in Rome as "Maria Josephina" while her nephew Romualdo Canori was a professed brother and the then Vicar-General of the De La Salle Brothers.

== Beatification ==
The beatification process commenced in Rome on 20 February 1874 under Pope Pius IX, who titled Mora a Servant of God. Her spiritual writings were approved by theologians on 16 December 1914. Pope Pius XI later confirmed her heroic virtue and named her venerable on 26 February 1928. The miracle needed for her to be beatified received the papal approval of Pope John Paul II On 6 July 1993. Pope John Paul beatified her on 24 April 1994 at Saint Peter's Square. The postulator for this cause is the Trinitarian priest Javier Carnerero Peñalver.

== See also ==
- List of people beatified by Pope John Paul II
