= María Dolores Rodríguez Sopeña =

Spanish Roman Catholic Nun

Blessed María Dolores Rodríguez Sopeña ICDS
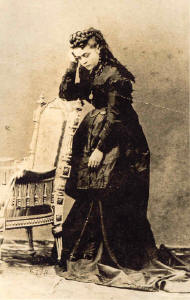
- Photograph.

Religious
- Born: 30 December 1848; Vélez-Rubio, Almería, Kingdom of Spain
- Died: 10 January 1918 (aged 69); Madrid, Kingdom of Spain
- Venerated in: Roman Catholic Church
- Beatified: 23 March 2003, Saint Peter's Square, Vatican City by Pope John Paul II
- Feast: 10 January
- Patronage: Sisters of the Catechetical Institute

María Dolores Rodríguez Sopeña, ICDS (30 December 1848 – 10 January 1918) was a Spanish Catholic nun and the founder of the Sisters of the Catechetical Institute.

Her religious activism came about from her earliest experiences in Almería where she tended to the poor including a leper though she later moved to Madrid and Puerto Rico where she continued her care for the poor and the sick. Her return to her native land saw her continue her work and her commitment to establishing religious and secular movements for others all directed towards active participation and care for poor people.

The beatification process commenced on 19 June 1980 and she became titled as a Servant of God while later being named as Venerable in 1992 after her life of heroic virtue was confirmed; Pope John Paul II later beatified her in Saint Peter's Square on 23 March 2003.

== Life ==
María Dolores Rodríguez Sopeña was born on 30 December 1848 as the fourth of seven children to Tomas Rodríguez Sopeña and Nicolasa Ortega Salomon; her baptism was celebrated in the following month.

Her father - although trained in law and due to his age - was working as a farm administrator. Her father later was named as a magistrate and in 1866 was promoted as a barrister. This exposed her to higher social circles but she did not like being exposed to them for she liked to be with poorer people and in 1866 she often visited the poor with her mother. Her father was posted to Puerto Rico in 1869 - and took the eldest son with him - but her mother and most of her siblings moved to Madrid where she taught at a women's prison. In 1872 the rest of them moved to Puerto Rico. In 1856 she had an operation for her sight but this instead left her with limited sight. Two sisters suffered from an illness and she tended to them in addition to a leper - she kept this hidden from her parents for she was worried she would be forbidden to continue her work.

In Puerto Rico she found the Jesuit priest Goicoechea to be her spiritual director and she later founded the Association of the Sodality of the Virgin Mary while also started schools for disadvantaged children. In 1873 her father was appointed as a state official in law for Santiago de Cuba. It was there that she established Centers of Instruction where she taught and also instructed in catechism as well as providing medical assistance. She tried to join the Vincentian Sisters but was not accepted because of her poor sight deemed to be an impediment that blocked admittance. Her mother died in 1877 in Cuba and her father then retired; all returned to Madrid where her father later died in 1883. Her spiritual director there in Madrid was the Jesuit priest López Soldado. In 1883 she joined a Salesians of Don Bosco convent at Soldado's suggestion but this lasted just over a week for she realized that that particular life was not for her.

In 1885 she established a social house which functioned as a service center for the poor of the area. Sopeña began visiting a slum neighborhood and established what came to known as the "Works of the Doctrines" that later became known as the "Workers' Centre" - she founded additional ones in 1896. At the urging of the Bishop of Madrid Ciriaco María Sancha y Hervás she established an organization for the faithful that was a secular one in 1892 and it received government approval in 1893. From 1896 until 1900 she made 199 trips across the nation to establish and consolidate her work and often accompanied Father Tarin to Andalucía to help him in the missions. In 1900 she made a pilgrimage to Rome and visited the tomb of Saint Peter while there.

On 24 September 1901 she established the Sisters of the Catechetical Institute and set up a group of them in Toledo at the suggestion of Cardinal Sancha. The foundress was reelected as the Superior General in 1910 for the order which had opened communities in Rome and in the Americas; she also established a civil association Obra Social Cultural Sopeña - or OSCUS - received government approval. Her order received the papal decree of praise in 1905 and full papal approval from Pope Pius X on 21 November 1907.

Sopeña died in 1918 and her remains were interred in Madrid while popular opinion held her as a saint; her order now operates in nations such as Argentina and the Dominican Republic amongst others.

== Beatification ==
The beatification process opened in Madrid in an informative process that spanned from 1928 until its solemn closure later in 1956 while theologians determined - on 1 July 1964 - that her spiritual writings were in full accordance with official doctrine. An apostolic process was later held in which Cardinal Vicente Enrique Tarancón oversaw it from 1981 until 26 March 1982; the Congregation for the Causes of Saints validated the two previous processes in Rome on 18 February 1983 before receiving the Positio in 1988. Theologians approved the cause on 17 December 1991 as did the C.C.S. on 19 May 1992 while the confirmation of her life of heroic virtue allowed for Pope John Paul II to name her as Venerable on 11 July 1992.

The miracle required for beatification was investigated in the location of its origin in 1968 before the C.C.S. later validated this on 5 February 1999; a medical board of experts later confirmed the healing was a miracle on 9 March 2000 as did a congress of theologians on 23 June 2000 and the cardinal and bishop members of the C.C.S. on 5 March 2002. John Paul II approved this healing - the 26 May 1957 cure of Victoriano Herrero Pérez - to be a miracle on 23 April 2002 and later beatified her on 23 March 2003.

The second miracle - the one for sainthood - was investigated in Madrid from 27 December 2005 until its closure on 25 January 2007 and involved the curing of the girl Dayanna Cantos Guillermo; the C.C.S. validated the process in Rome on 25 January 2008.

The current postulator for this cause is the Trinitarian priest Antonio Sáez de Albéniz and the vice-postulator is Jacqueline Rivas Agurto.
