= Domingo Iturrate Zubero =

Spanish priest (1901–1927)

Blessed Domingo Iturrate Zubero OSsT
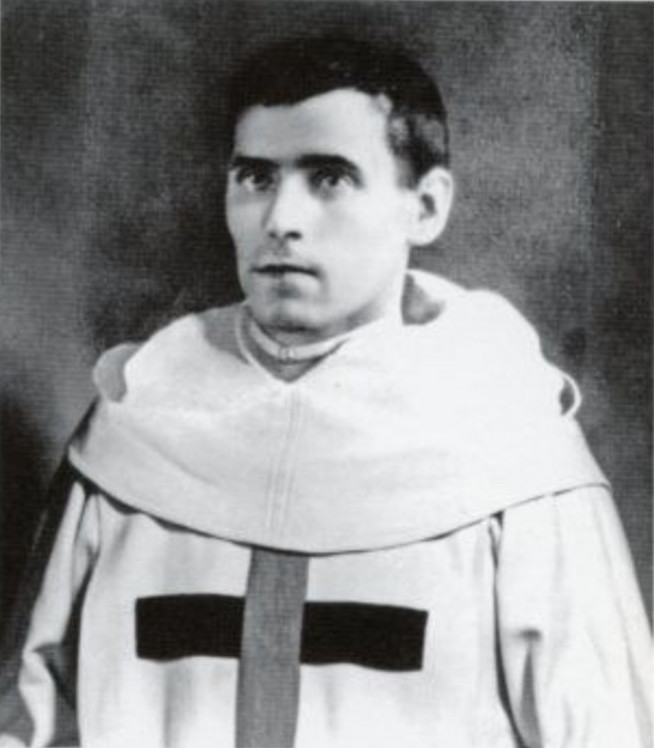
- Born: 11 May 1901; Dima, Vizcaya, Kingdom of Spain
- Died: 7 April 1927 (aged 25); Belmonte, Cuenca, Kingdom of Spain
- Venerated in: Roman Catholic Church
- Beatified: 30 October 1983, Saint Peter's Square, Vatican City by Pope John Paul II
- Feast: 11 May

Domingo Iturrate Zubero (11 May 1901 – 7 April 1927), religious name Domingo of the Blessed Sacrament, was a Spanis religious priest of the Trinitarians. Zubero grappled with tuberculosis as he underwent his studies in Rome where he was ordained to the priesthood. He became noted for his staunch devotion to the Blessed Virgin Mary. His beatification was celebrated under Pope John Paul II in 1983.

== Life ==
Domingo Iturrate Zubero was born in Dima in mid-1901 as one of twelve children to Simone Iturrate and María Zubero. He made his First Communion in 1911 and made his Confirmation on 26 August 1913.

Zubero entered the Trinitarian Order in Algorta on 30 September 1914 and spent his period of novitiate in the house of La Bien Aparecida in Cantabria. He was vested in the habit on 11 December 1917. Zubero received the religious name of "Domingo of the Blessed Sacrament" at the time of his initial profession on 14 December 1918. He commenced his philosophical studies in 1918 and in October 1919 was sent to Rome to continue those studies at the Pontifical Gregorian University where he later obtained his degree on 3 July 1922; he later graduated in theological studies on 26 July 1926. He professed his solemn vows on 23 October 1922 in San Carlo alle Quattro Fontane and was later ordained to the priesthood on 9 August 1925 in the church of Santi XII Apostoli. He celebrated Mass "as an act of personal sacrifice in union with the Supreme Victim on behalf of all" and celebrated his first Mass on the Feast of the Assumption on 15 August 1925.

In June 1926 it was learned that he had become afflicted with an advanced stage of tuberculosis and he spent the remainder of his life in the order's house of Belmonte in Cuenca after he spent a brief period of time at Rocca di Papa. Before he had arrived in Spain on 6 September 1926 he made a brief detour to Lourdes in France and then continued on to the order's house. He died on 7 April 1927 from tuberculosis and his remains were placed in a side chapel of the Santo Redentor church in Algorta after their transferral in 1974.

== Beatification ==
The beatification process commenced after it had been determined that there would be two competent forums in which the cause would be conducted in: Cuenca and Vitoria. The informative process in Vitoria commenced on 22 September 1928 and concluded on 7 April 1931 while the informative process in Cuenca spanned from 21 September 1931 until 21 October 1931. There was another process that opened in Rome at this time and it spanned from 3 August 1932 to 15 January 1925 while an apostolic process in Bilbao spanned from 21 November 1959 to 15 July 1961 before all of these processes received the validation of the Congregation for Rites on 21 March 1964. All of Zubero's spiritual writings received the positive approval of theologians on 18 November 1936. The formal introduction to the cause came under Pope Pius XII on 29 May 1958 in which the late Trinitarian priest was titled as a Servant of God.

The Congregation for the Causes of Saints and their consultants met and approved the cause on 19 February 1980 while the former met themselves on 10 June 1980 and further approved it. Pope John Paul II named Zubero as Venerable on 11 October 1980 after he had confirmed that the late priest had lived a life of heroic virtue. The process for a miracle opened in Valencia on 27 January 1961 and concluded sometime later while receiving C.C.S. validation in Rome on 26 June 1981 before receiving the approval of the medical board based there on 18 June 1982. Theologians likewise approved this miracle on 11 January 1983 as did the C.C.S. on 1 March 1983. John Paul II approved it on 14 May 1983 and beatified Zubero in Saint Peter's Square on 30 October 1983.

The current postulator for the cause is the Rev. Javier Carnerero Peñalver.

== Publications ==
- Anthony O. D'Errico,The Trinitarians, Roma, 1997.
- Manuel Fuentes, La voluntad de ser santos: beato Domingo Iturrate Zubero, Trinitario, Deusto, 1983.
- José Gamarra, Beato Domingo Iturrate in Meditaciones Trinitarias, Roma, Secretariado general trinitario, 2003.
- José Hernández Sánchez, Espigando en el patrimonio trinitario, Roma, Tipografia Cardoni s.a.s., 2001. ISBN 88-900340-2-5.
