= Eugenia Maria Ravasco =

Italian Roman Catholic nun

Blessed Eugenia Maria Ravasco
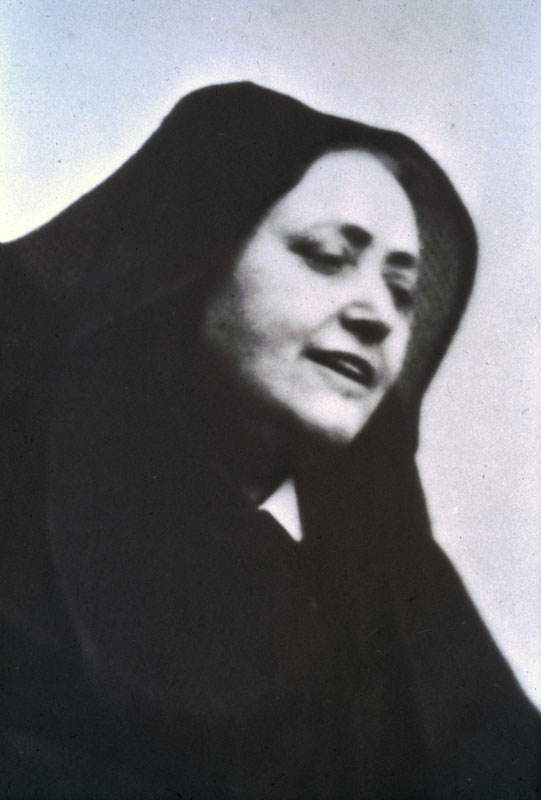

Religious
- Born: 4 January 1845; Milan, Kingdom of Lombardy–Venetia
- Died: 30 December 1900 (aged 55); Genoa, Kingdom of Italy
- Venerated in: Roman Catholic Church
- Beatified: 27 April 2003, Saint Peter's Square, Vatican City by Pope John Paul II
- Feast: 30 December
- Attributes: Religious habit
- Patronage: Ravasco Institute

Eugenia Maria Ravasco (4 January 1845 - 30 December 1900) was an Italian Roman Catholic nun of the Ravasco Institute that she herself had established - the order was also known as the Daughters of the Sacred Hearts of Jesus and Mary and was founded in the Archdiocese of Genoa where she spent most of her life.

Ravasco devoted her entire life to the service of God and to aiding the poor and the sick across parishes in Genoa and in various hospitals. She travelled across the Italian state as well as in Switzerland to spread the message of her order and also acted as a catechist to the poor. She was also on close terms with various priests and the Genoa archbishop Salvatore Magnasco.

She was beatified on 27 April 2003.

== Life ==
Eugenia Maria Ravasco was born in Milan in 1845 as the third of six children to banker Francesco Matteo Ravasco (d. March 1855) and Carolina Mozzoni Frosconi (d. 1848). The eldest child was Ambrose while the last was Elisa (d. 1868).

Her mother died in 1848 and her father relocated to Genoa with two of his male children in order to find work. Because of this she was raised in Milan under the care of her pious aunt Marietta Anselmi. The siblings in Milan were reunited with their father and siblings in Genoa in 1852 but was short lived when their father died in March 1855. Due to this the siblings moved in with Luigi and Elisa Ravasco and their ten children.

On 21 June 1855 she made her First Communion and her Confirmation. It was around this time anti-clerical sentiment spread across the Italian peninsula and her brother Ambrose joined their forces - this alarmed their uncle Luigi. Ravasco was forced to assume the duties of head of the household after her uncle Luigi died in December 1862.

Ravasco felt a strong call to the religious life on 31 May 1863 and felt the strong call to submit to a vocation that was dedicated to the Sacred Heart of Jesus. It was at that time she heard the priest Giacinto Bianchi give a meditation in the Church of Santa Sabina and it impelled her to devote herself to God and to give up marriage prospects. Ravasco was promised in marriage to a marquis but she refused based on her calling though her relations did not protest though would have preferred she accepted the offer. She also began to teach catechism and help poor girls with the aid of her spiritual director and the priest Giuseppe Como. Ravasco later worked under the direction of the Jesuit Luigi Persoglio.

In 1867 at the age of 22 she became part of the Ladies of Saint Catherine of Portoria and visited patients of the Pammatone hospital. It was in 1868 that her sister Elisa died. Around this time - on 6 December 1868 - she established her new religious congregation (the Ravasco Institute) with the aid of Salvatore Magnasco. She drafted her Rule with the help of Father Persoglio. In 1870 she bought a building on a hill where she established a female boarding school and in 1878 she founded a school for science. Her congregation - in 1883 - was aggregated to the Order of Friars Minor. In 1892 she opened a home for working women.

She spent the remainder of her life as the first superior of the institute. She also travelled to France and Switzerland to start new communities for the congregation and correct anti-Christian press. The institute received diocesan approval in 1882 after Magnasco was appointed as the Archbishop of Genoa on 12 January. On 4 October 1884 she and 18 others made their solemn profession into the new institute. It spread across Liguria and the first branch opened in Levanto in 1887.

Ravasco died on 30 December 1900. In 1905 the order moved to settle in Rome after the invitation of Pope Pius X was extended to them. He issued a decree of praise for them on 23 November 1907 and approved the Constitution on 6 August 1909. The document underwent a revision which received the approval of Pope Benedict XV on 28 February 1920. Her institute now operates in places such as Albania and Colombia. As of 2005 there were 409 religious in 73 houses.

== Beatification ==
The informative process for the beatification cause commenced in 1948 - under Pope Pius XII. During this time her writings were compiled into a large dossier for theologians to evaluate and their task was to ascertain whether or not such writings were in line with the magisterium with the Roman Catholic Church. Her writings received approval on 10 December 1964.

These dual processes occurred despite the fact that the formal introduction of the cause was not until 26 January 1981 in which she was granted the posthumous title of Servant of God - the first stage in the process. Following this there was the apostolic process and its conclusion allowed for both to be validated in Rome on 18 April 1986.

In 1992 the postulation submitted the Positio to the Congregation for the Causes of Saints for further assessment. Theologians approved the contents on 14 March 2000 while the C.C.S. followed likewise on 6 June 2000. On 1 July 2000 she was proclaimed to be Venerable after Pope John Paul II declared the fact that she had lived a model Christian life of heroic virtue.

The miracle needed for her beatification was investigated in the diocese of its origin and the process received validation on 17 October 1998 in Rome. The pope approved the healing to be a legitimate miracle in 2002 and allowed for him to preside over Ravasco's beatification on 27 April 2003 in Saint Peter's Square.

The current postulator assigned to the cause is Miranda Ruscitti.
