= Laura of Constantinople =

Saint Laura of Constantinople
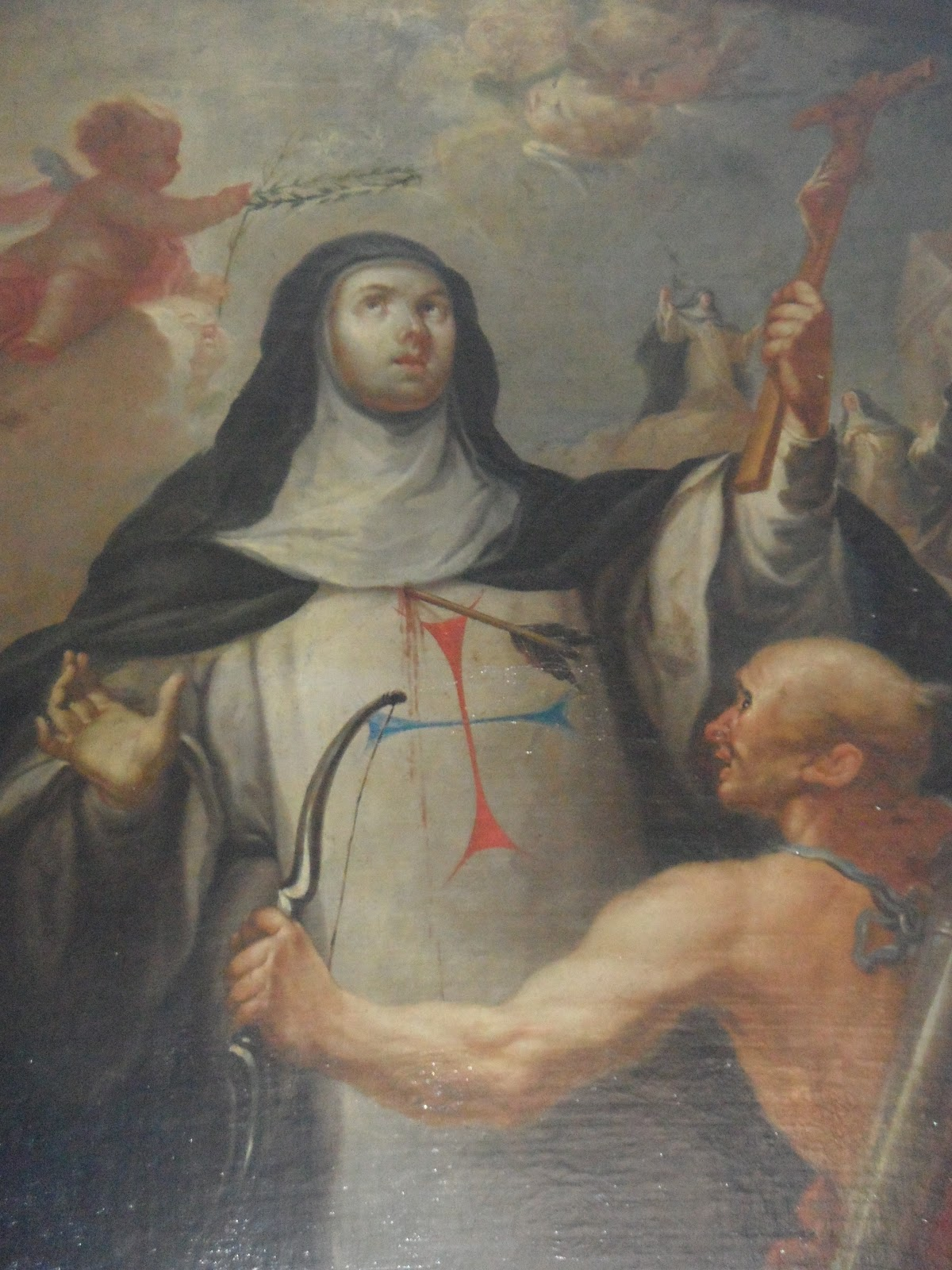
- Born: 1400; Constantinople, Byzantine Empire (modern-day Istanbul, Turkey)
- Died: 29 May 1453
- Venerated in: Catholic Church
- Feast: 29 May

Saint Laura of Constantinople (died 1453) was a Roman Catholic nun who lived in Constantinople. She was a member of the Order of the Holy Trinity.

== Life ==
=== Ancestry and early life ===
Her birth name was Theodolinde Trasci. She was born in Greece into a noble family: her father was a Latin knight named Michael and her mother Helena was Albanian.

=== Monastic life ===
After she became a nun in Constantinople, she changed her name into Laura of Saint Peter, eventually rising to become an abbess at the age of 30. She was said to possess “excellent virtues of governance and piety.”

=== Martyrdom ===
She was martyred by the Ottoman Turks who took Constantinople on 29 May 1453. They scalded her to death, as well as the other 52 sisters of her convent who were either beheaded or mortally wounded.

Her feast day is on 29 May.
