= Pierre Vigne =

French Roman Catholic priest

Blessed Pierre Vigne
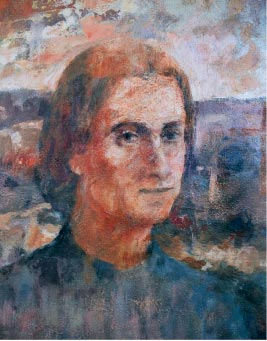

Priest
- Born: 20 August 1670; Privas, Ardèche, France
- Died: 8 July 1740 (aged 69); Rencurel, Isère, France
- Venerated in: Roman Catholic Church
- Beatified: 3 October 2004, Saint Peter's Square, Vatican City by Pope John Paul II
- Feast: 8 July
- Attributes: Crucifix; Staff
- Patronage: Blessed Sacrament Sisters of Valence

Pierre Vigne (20 August 1670 – 8 July 1740) was a French Roman Catholic priest who established the Blessed Sacrament Sisters of Valence.

Pope John Paul II beatified him in 2004.

== Life ==
Pierre Vigne was born in 1670 as one of five children to Pierre Vigne and Frances Gautier. He was better educated than most of his peers and served as an active member in his parish. A religious vocation manifested in his late teens when he received a sudden and active awareness of Jesus Christ in the Eucharist.

Vigne entered the Sulpician Seminary in Viviers in 1690 to commence his studies, and was ordained to the priesthood on 18 September 1694. After this, he served as a parish curate for six years and joined the Vincentian missionaries in Lyon in 1700, acting as a missionary and a preacher. He left the Vincentians in 1706 and became known as a travelling priest for the next three decades.

He would preach and celebrate Mass at the places he visited and also visited the sick and carried out confessions. It was on 30 November 1715 that he founded the Blessed Sacrament Sisters of Valence and following this established schools for children.

He died in 1740.

== Beatification ==
The official cause of beatification commenced on a local level in France on 19 September 1894, before the Positio was submitted to the Congregation for the Causes of Saints. Pope John Paul II declared that he lived a life of heroic virtue and proclaimed him to be Venerable on 7 July 2003. That same pope beatified him after the recognition of a miracle on 3 October 2004.
