= Pierre-François Jamet =

French Roman Catholic priest

Blessed Pierre-François Jamet
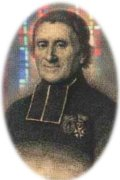
- Born: 13 September 1762; Fresnes, Aisne, Kingdom of France
- Died: 12 January 1845 (aged 82); Caen, Calvados, French Kingdom
- Resting place: Caen, France
- Venerated in: Roman Catholic Church
- Beatified: 10 May 1987, Saint Peter's Square, Vatican City by Pope John Paul II
- Feast: 12 January
- Patronage: Sisters of the Good Saviour

Pierre-François Jamet (13 September 1762 - 12 January 1845) was a French Roman Catholic priest who refused to take the oath of allegiance during the French Revolution. He is also called the "Second Founder" due to restoring the dwindled congregation of the Sisters of the Good Saviour. In 1827 he was awarded the Legion of Honor for his service as a priest.

Jamet was beatified in 1987 after Pope John Paul II approved a miracle attributed to his intercession. Jamet remains the patron of the congregation he restored.

== Life ==
Pierre-François Jamet was born on 13 September 1762 in France to the poor farmers Pierre Jamet and Marie Madeleine Busnot. He had eight siblings - two became priests and one sister became a nun.

In 1782 he commenced his theological and philosophical studies at the University of Caen upon feeling that he was being called to become a priest and commenced his studies for the priesthood in that same village in 1784. He graduated with a masters in arts and completing a bachelor of theological studies. Jamet was ordained to the priesthood on 22 September 1787. However he could not go for further studies due to the outbreak of revolution not long after.

Jamet refused to swear allegiance to the new government of the French Revolution in 1790 and was later arrested due to this dissidence. He even suffered death threats at this time. Upon his release he set about the restoration of the Sisters of the Good Saviour which was in decline at that time and would celebrate mass in secret. On 19 November 1790 he was appointed as its chaplain and confessor. He became the superior of the congregation in 1819.

He also served as the rector of his old educational institute where he graduated and served there from 1822 to 1830. He also established a school for teaching people who were deaf. In 1827 he was recognized for his great service as a priest and was thus awarded the Legion of Honor.

Jamet died in 1845. He is buried in Caen.

== Beatification ==
The beatification process commenced in 1930. Theologians approved Jamet's spiritual writings on 8 July 1936. On 21 March 1985 he was declared to be Venerable after Pope John Paul II acknowledged the fact that Jamet had lived a life of heroic virtue.

The miracle needed for beatification was investigated and ratified on 19 April 1985. The pope approved the healing to be a legitimate miracle on 5 June 1986 and beatified Jamet on 10 May 1987.
