= Pierre Bonhomme =

French Roman Catholic priest

Blessed Pierre Bonhomme
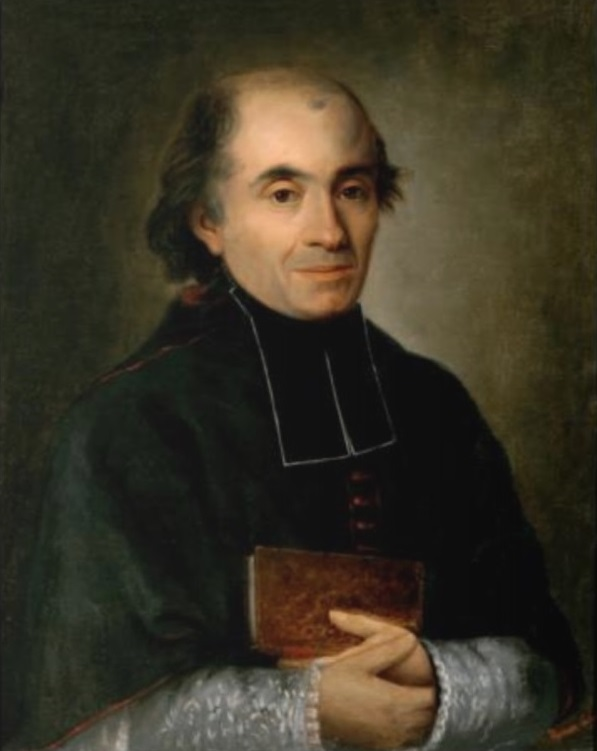

Priest
- Born: 4 July 1803; Gramat, Lot, First French Empire
- Died: 9 September 1861 (aged 58); Gramat, Lot, Second French Empire
- Venerated in: Roman Catholic Church
- Beatified: 23 March 2003, Saint Peter's Square, Vatican City by Pope John Paul II
- Feast: 9 September
- Attributes: Cassock
- Patronage: Sisters of Our Lady of Calvary of Gramat; Preachers

Pierre Bonhomme (4 July 1803 – 9 September 1861) was a French Roman Catholic priest who exercised his pastoral mission in Cahors. He went on to establish the new religious congregation known as the Sisters of Our Lady of Calvary of Gramat.

Bonhomme established his new congregation with the aim of the education of children and assistance to the poor and the handicapped. He opened schools for children and educated people about the importance of service to the poor and those who required aid. He was remembered after his death as a tireless preacher and evangelizer.

He was beatified on 23 March 2003 after the recognition of a healing attributed to him as a miracle.

== Life ==
Pierre Bonhomme was born in 1803 in France; he had one sister. He was a pious and studious child who felt his religious calling as a child.

He commenced his studies for the priesthood at Montfaucon in November 1818 and was later ordained to the diaconate. While a deacon he established a school for adolescent males. He was ordained to the priesthood on 23 December 1827 and was assigned as a parish priest in the Diocese of Cahors. In 1831 he opened a school to prepare seminarians for the priesthood and to help them with their studies and he later went on to establish the Children of Mary to provide for the spiritual need of girls in Gramat.

He gained a formidable reputation as a preacher and he urged all people, especially the youth, to visit and to help the poor and the frail who he believed were effectively abandoned and left to fend for themselves. He founded a home around this same time, and he also established his own religious congregation that was tasked with teaching children, helping the poor and assisting the sick and disabled. Known for his devotion to Our Lady of Rocamadour, he turned to her after he had completely lost his voice while preaching a retreat; he was miraculously healed and managed to complete the retreat.

Bonhomme felt a strong calling to the Carmelite life in 1836 after a brief retreat to a Trappist monastery in Mortagne, but his bishop insisted that he continue his work as a parish priest. He relented and preached until 1848 until a disease that struck his larynx forced him to cease preaching. After this, he turned all of his attention to the order and made efforts to expand their work into the care for the deaf and the mute in 1854, and later in 1856 expanding its role to the care of the mentally ill. He continued to guide the professed religious of the order and wrote their Rule.

Bonhomme died on 9 September 1861. His order expanded across France but also to other states such as Brazil and the Philippines.

== Beatification ==
The beatification process commenced in Cahors in a diocesan process that assembled both documentation and testimonies in 1952. This granted him the posthumous title Servant of God and occurred despite the fact that the formal introduction of the cause did not take place until 15 March 1980. The Positio - documentation on his life and an account of his virtues - was compiled after the process and was submitted to the Congregation for the Causes of Saints in Rome in 1984.

He was proclaimed to be Venerable on 23 October 1987 after Pope John Paul II recognized that Bonhomme had lived a life of heroic virtue.

The miracle needed for his beatification was subjected to full investigation in a diocesan tribunal and was granted its formal ratification on 27 October 2000 in order for the cause to proceed to Rome. John Paul II approved it and beatified him on 23 March 2004.
