= Maria Anna Sala =

Italian Roman Catholic

Blessed Maria Anna Sala I.M.

Religious
- Born: 21 April 1829; Brivio, Lecco, Kingdom of Lombardy–Venetia
- Died: 24 November 1891 (aged 62); Milan, Kingdom of Italy
- Venerated in: Roman Catholic Church
- Beatified: 26 October 1980, Saint Peter's Square, Vatican City by Pope John Paul II
- Feast: 24 November
- Attributes: Religious habit
- Patronage: Sisters of Saint Marcellina; Against throat cancer; Educators

Maria Anna Sala (21 April 1829 – 24 November 1891) was an Italian Roman Catholic professed religious who was a member of the Sisters of Saint Marcellina. She served throughout her life as an educator across the northern Italian cities and carried out her work in the name of God.

Sala continued to serve as a teacher even when it became known in 1883 that she had contracted throat cancer though the progression of the illness made her duties far more difficult to perform. She died of the disease almost a decade after contracting it.

Her beatification was celebrated on 26 October 1980.

== Life ==
Maria Anna Sala was born in Brivio on 21 April 1829 as the fifth of eight children to Giovanni and Giovannina Sala; two of her siblings were Genoveffa and Lucia. Sala was baptized mere hours after she was born.

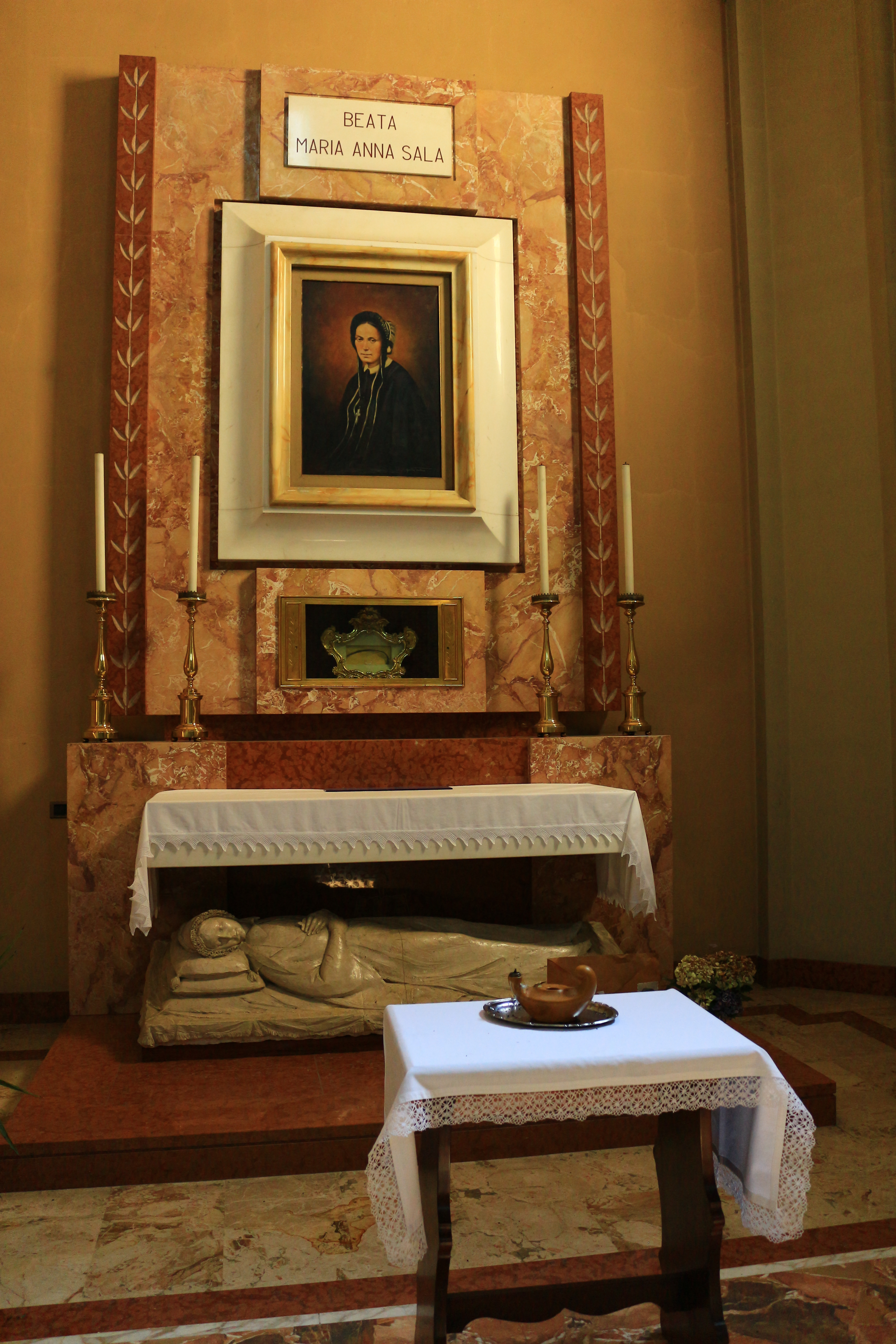
Chapel dedicated to Maria Anna Sala (and her relics) in the parish church of her hometown, Brivio

Her education was overseen at home until such time when she could attend an actual school. She commenced her formal studies at the age of eleven in Vimercate in a school that the Sisters of Saint Marcellina managed - an order that Luigi Biraghi had established. She was the top of class throughout her entire time there.

Following the completion of her studies she received a teaching certification on 16 November 1846. It was at this point that she perceived the call of Jesus Christ to be part of the religious life and she decided to join the Sisters of Saint Marcellina who had educated her. However a cousin came to her and took her back home in order to aid her ailing mother. Despite this setback she was resolved to aid her mother and then realize her vocation and spent time in teaching catechism to children. one occasion her father protested when she gave alms to a poor man: "Right now we need to think of ourselves!" Sala responded: "God will think of us". While being at home she and one of her sister's liked to visit the Oratory of Saint Leonard. She returned - in 1848 - to the congregation as a postulant once the situation of her household eased; she professed her final vows on 13 September 1852. She had entered the order alongside her sisters Genoveffa and Lucia who were admitted into the order's school as students.

Sala was dedicated to teaching in various colleges of the institute in both Genoa and Milan; amongst the subjects that she taught were music and the French language. In 1859 - during the Second Italian War of Independence - she tended to the wounded soldiers and suspended her teaching duties in order to do this.

In 1868 she was appointed as the vice-superior of the congregation at which point she embarked for Genoa. Sala returned to Milan in 1878 to teach while still serving as the assistant general to the superior amongst other positions. Of these posts she was forced to juggle she - on 1 November 1878 - wrote to the superior of the school in Genoa: "Dearest Superior Catherine, I received the news of my new assignment yesterday; I cannot yet express the effect it has had on my soul, as I am still so stunned by it. But enough argument! The Lord wills it this way, the Lord will help me".

In 1883 she learned that she had contracted throat cancer and over time experienced a series of neck deformities that were quite visible. She wore a black scarf in order to conceal the deformations. Sala often laughed off her own illness and called her neck deformities "my necklace of pearls". When the pain was bad and forced her to tear she said to those around her: "Excuse me, I have set a poor example. I will be more careful ... the suffering will have earned me something for Heaven. Up there I will pray for everyone. How beautiful Heaven will be!" Sala was forced to stop teaching in October 1891 due to her illness.

On 24 November 1891 she succumbed to her throat cancer with her last words being: "Pray for me, Queen of Virgins". Her remains were exhumed in the morning of 29 January 1920 in Cernusco sul Naviglio where she was buried; her remains were deemed to be incorrupt and the chaplain present said of it: "This was a young sister. She could not have been more than 30 years old".

== Beatification ==
The beatification process commenced in Milan with a diocesan process that Cardinal Alfredo Ildefonso Schuster opened; the process spanned from 27 May 1931 until 22 September 1938. The process also saw the collation of Sala's writings that included personal reflections and letters as a means of ascertaining the depth of her spiritual life. The decree on her writings - as a sign of approval - was signed on 3 December 1944.

The process and the ratification of her writings took place despite the fact that the formal introduction of the cause did not come until 28 January 1959 under Pope John XXIII when the Congregation of Rites approved the cause and granted Sala the title Servant of God. One final process was held again in Milan from 28 May 1962 to 1964; a decree that ratified the process was signed on 28 May 1966.

Upon the acknowledgement of Pope Paul VI of her life of heroic virtue she was proclaimed to be Venerable on 14 April 1977.

The approval of one miracle attributed to her intercession allowed for Pope John Paul II to preside over her beatification on 26 October 1980.
