= Domenico Mazzarella =

Italian Roman Catholic priest

Blessed Domenico Mazzarella
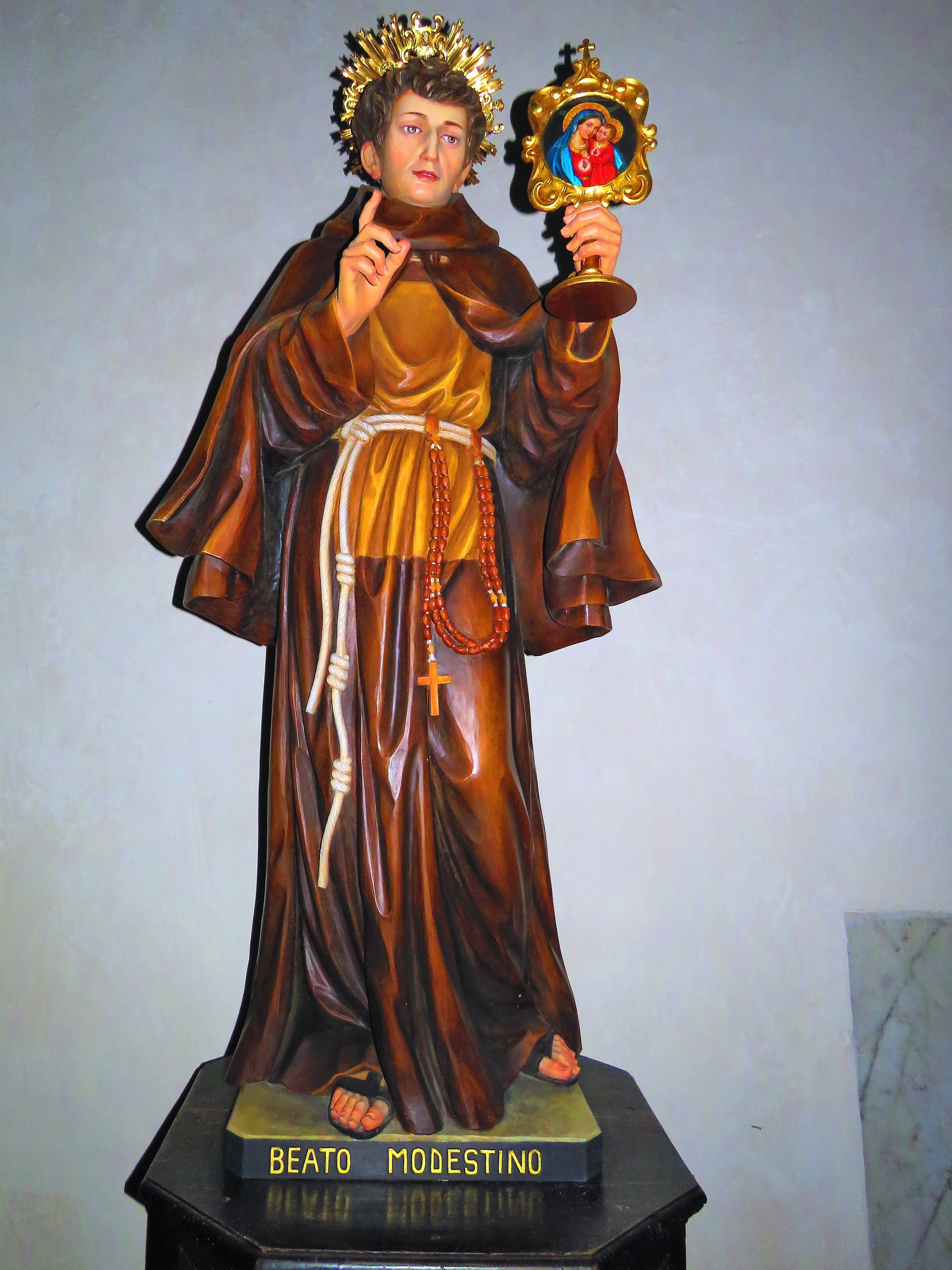

Priest
- Born: 5 September 1802; Frattamaggiore, Naples, Kingdom of Naples
- Died: 4 July 1854 (aged 51); Naples, Kingdom of the Two Sicilies
- Venerated in: Roman Catholic Church
- Beatified: 29 January 1995, Saint Peter's Basilica, Vatican City by Pope John Paul II
- Feast: 4 July
- Attributes: Franciscan habit
- Patronage: Frattamaggiore

Domenico Mazzarella (5 September 1802 – 4 July 1854) was an Italian Roman Catholic priest. He was also a professed member of the Franciscan Friars Minor of the Alcantarines and assumed the name of "Modestino of Jesus and Mary". He devoted his life to service to those who were poor and sick and he himself later succumbed to cholera during an epidemic as he tended to the ill.

He was beatified in 1995.

== Life ==
Domenico Mazzarella was born in Frattamaggiore, near Naples, on 9 September 1802 to poor parents as the last of six children. As a child he showed prominent religious fervor and he was an active participant in his parish.

At the age of eighteen he commenced his studies for the priesthood in Aversa on the recommendation of Bishop Agostino Tommasi who had been impressed with his zeal and his devotion to religious life. He continued with his studies even after the death of his benefactor Tommasi in 1821 and was later clothed in the Franciscan habit for the first time in Grumo Nevano in 1822. He later spent his novitiate in Naples and made his religious profession on 27 November 1824. After the completion of both his theological and philosophical education he was ordained to the priesthood in Avrersa on 22 December 1827. He spent his time preaching and hearing confessions; he would spend long hours in this latter task. In 1839 he was sent to a slum quarter of Naples and spent the remainder of his life there catering to the needs of the poor and sick. Mazzarella was also a friend of Pope Pius IX and he was also a collaborator of Cardinal Sisto Riario Sforza and King Ferdinand II.

His work with cholera victims saw himself afflicted with the disease and he died in 1854 during the epidemic.

== Beatification ==
Mazzarella's spiritual writings were approved by theologians on 13 January 1887. The beatification process commenced under Pope Leo XIII on 11 March 1891, granting Mazzarella the title of Servant of God. Two diocesan tribunals were opened in Naples to evaluate his life and to compile summaries of both his life and his works. Both processes were granted ratification on 11 November 1903 and allowed for the publication of the Positio to be sent to Rome for further evaluation.

He was declared to be Venerable on 9 June 1983 after Pope John Paul II recognized that he had lived a model Christian life of heroic virtue. The miracle attributed to him was also investigated - later to be ratified in 1991 - and the pope approved that in a decree on 23 December 1993. It allowed for him to celebrate the beatification on 29 January 1995.
