= San Carlo alle Quattro Fontane =

- Church of Saint Charles at the Four Fountains
- San Carlo alle Quattro Fontane
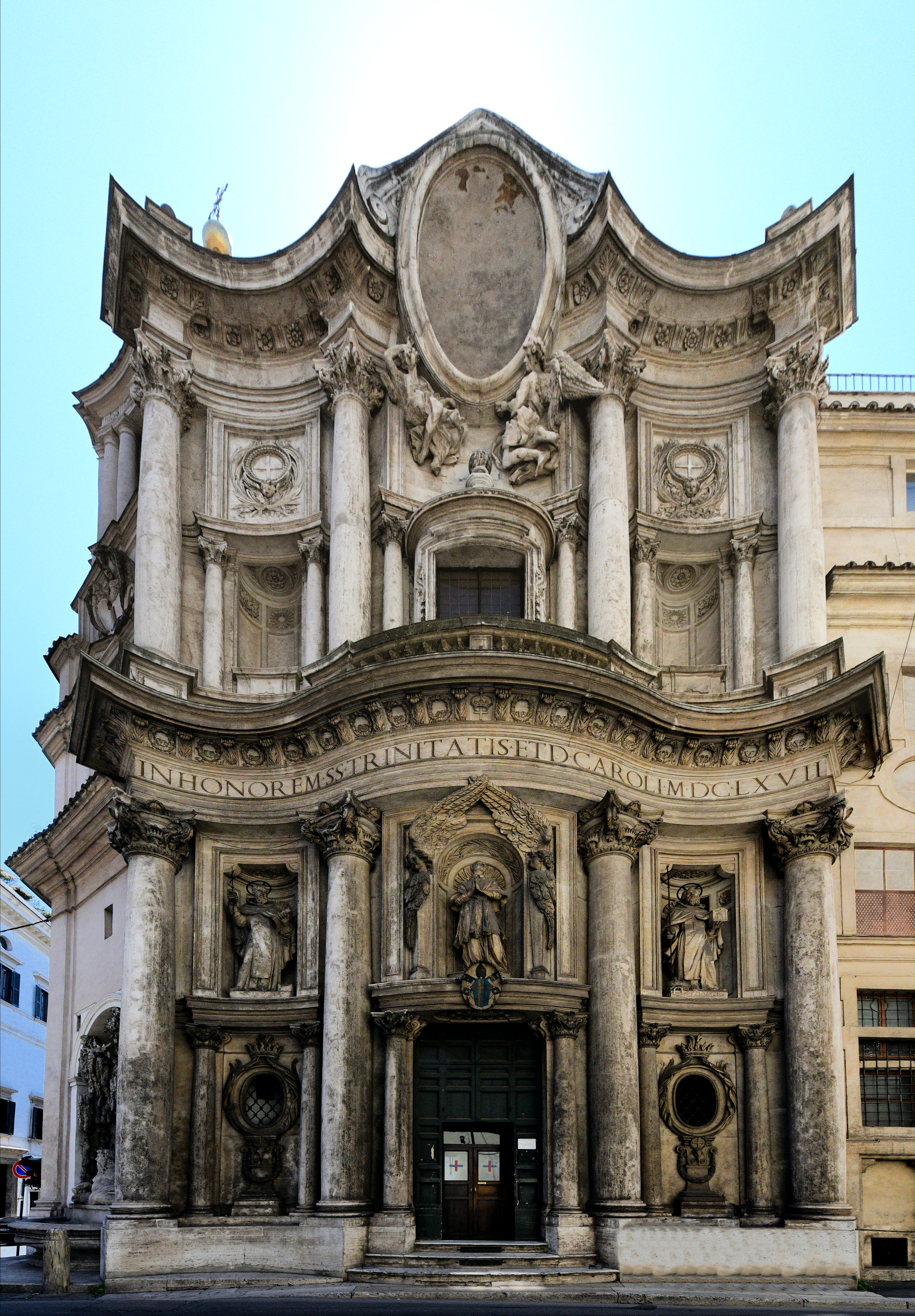
- Façade of Church of San Carlo alle Quattro Fontane by Francesco Borromini
- Click on the map to see marker.
- 41°54′07″N 12°29′27″E
- Location: Via del Quirinale 23 00184, Rome
- Country: Italy
- Language: Italian
- Denomination: Catholic
- Tradition: Roman Rite
- Religious order: Trinitarians
- Website: sancarlino.ch

History
- Status: Parish church, Spanish national church
- Dedication: Charles Borromeo
- Consecrated: 1646

Architecture
- Architect: Francesco Borromini
- Style: Baroque
- Groundbreaking: 1638

Specifications
- Length: 20 m (66 ft)
- Width: 12 m (39 ft)

The church of San Carlo alle Quattro Fontane (Saint Charles at the Four Fountains), also called San Carlino, is a Roman Catholic church in Rome, Italy. The church was designed by the architect Francesco Borromini and it was his first independent commission. It is an iconic masterpiece of Baroque architecture, built as part of a complex of monastic buildings on the Quirinal Hill for the Spanish Trinitarians, an order dedicated to the freeing of Christian slaves. He received the commission in 1634, under the patronage of Cardinal Francesco Barberini, whose palace was across the road. However, this financial backing did not last and subsequently the building project suffered various financial difficulties. It is one of at least three churches in Rome dedicated to Saint Charles Borromeo, including San Carlo ai Catinari and San Carlo al Corso.

== History ==
The Trinitarian Order first acquired the parcel of land between 1611-1612, though design for the church did not begin until 1634. Francesco Borromini offered to complete the commission free of charge in order to start his career as a solo architect.

Borromini's design started in 1634 with the living quarters for the monks, including the refrectory and the library. This was followed by the beginning of the design of the cloisters in 1635. Construction of the church took place during the period 1638–1641; in 1646 it was dedicated to Saint Charles Borromeo. At the point of his death in 1667 there was no ornament on the facade. Although the idea for the serpentine facade must have been conceived fairly early on, probably in the mid-1630s, it was only constructed towards the end of Borromini's life and the upper part was not completed until after the architect's death. Construction continued under the direction of Borromini's nephew, Barnardo, until 1682.

The site for the new church and its monastery was at the southwest corner of the "Quattro Fontane", which refers to the four corner fountains set on the oblique at the intersection of two roads, the Strada Pia and the Strada Felice. Bernini's oval church of Sant'Andrea al Quirinale would later be built further along the Strada Pia.

The inscriptions found in San Carlo, a valuable source illustrating the history of the church, have been collected and published by Vincenzo Forcella.

== Architect ==
Francesco Borromini (1599–1667) came from a lower-class background but quickly built a name for himself by taking on small commissions for churches around Europe. Borromini became known as a father of baroque architecture after completing his first solo project – San Carlo alle Quattro Fontane.

Borromini first found his interest in architecture through his travels to Milan, in which his father sent him to observe stonecutting. His interest lead to years of architectural and sculptural training which caused a growing debt to his father. Borromini fled to Rome to avoid his debt and found himself becoming an architectural star pupil under renowned Italian architect Carlo Maderno. Together, Maderno and Borromini worked side by side on numerous architectural giants, St. Peter's Basilica, Palazzo Barberini, Sant’Andrea della Valle, until Maderno died and Borromini found himself working as a solo baroque architect.

== Design ==
=== Exterior ===
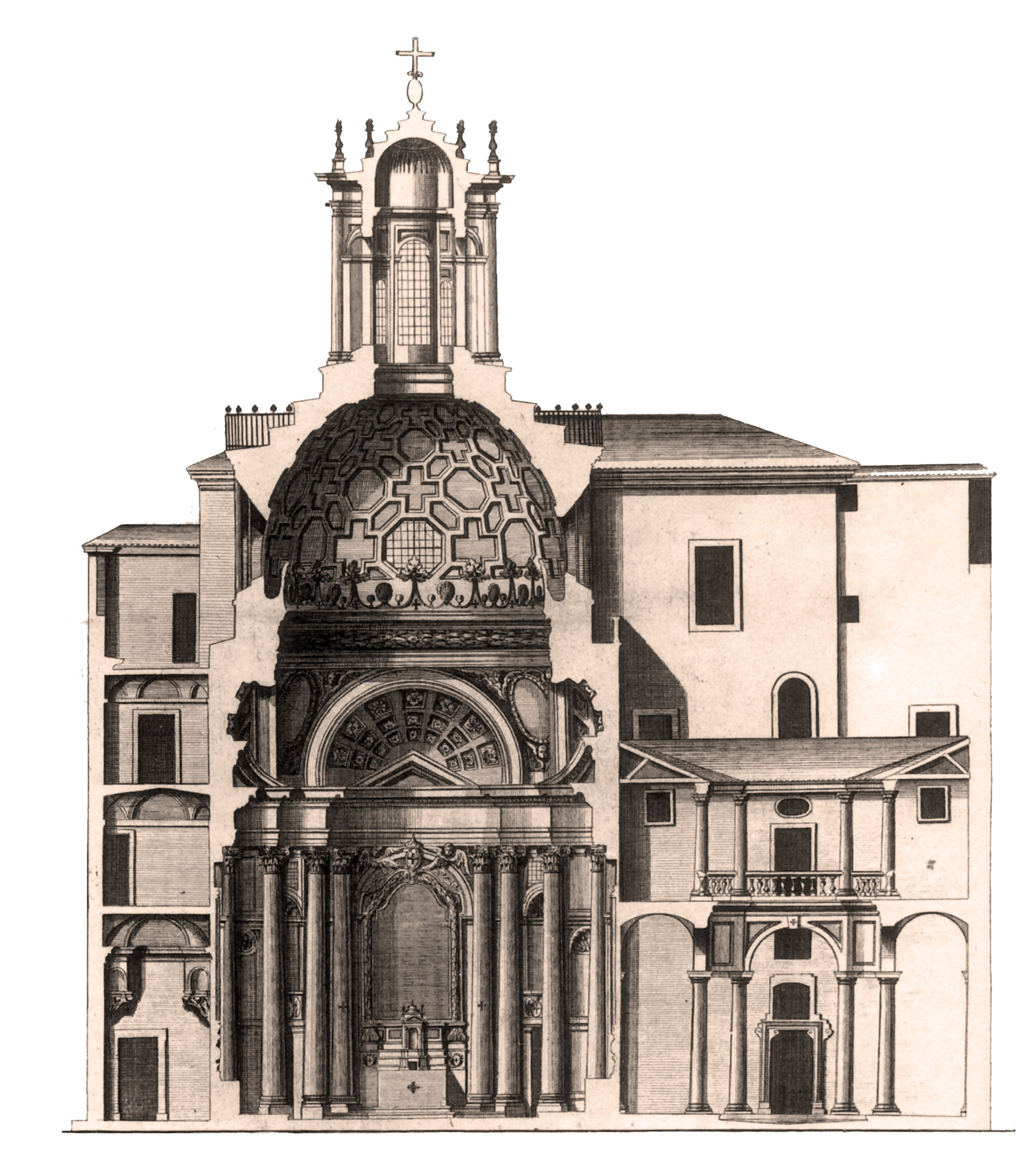
Section of San Carlo alle Quattro Fontane, ca. 1730

The concave-convex facade of San Carlo undulates in a non-classic way. Tall corinthian columns stand on plinths and bear the main entablatures; these define the main framework of two storeys and the tripartite bay division. Between the columns, smaller columns with their entablatures weave behind the main columns and in turn they frame niches, windows, a variety of sculptures as well as the main door, the central oval aedicule of the upper order and the oval framed medallion borne aloft by angels. The medallion once contained a 1677 fresco by Pietro Giarguzzi depicting the Coronation of Mary by the Holy Trinity. Above the main entrance, cherubim herms frame the central figure of Saint Charles Borromeo by Antonio Raggi and to either side are statues of St. John of Matha and St. Felix of Valois, the founders of the Trinitarian Order. Separating the two storeys is a frieze containing the Latin inscription: "IN HONOREM SS. TRINITATIS ET D. CAROLI MDCLXVII". This translates to: "In honour of the Most Holy Trinity and Saint Charles, 1667"

The plan and section show the layout of the cramped and difficult site; the church is on the corner with the cloister next to it and both face onto the Via Pia. The monastic buildings straddle the site, beyond which Borromini intended to design a garden. The church itself is only 66 feet wide and 39 feet long – deeming a non-classic plan vital. Before the baroque style became the style of choice in the seventeenth century, the renaissance was full of buildings with very rectangular shapes. The baroque style introduced curves and ovals, which Borromini combined with cubic elements to create a floor plan that fit the awkward site's requirements. Not only did the curves suit the site, but it also enhanced the baroque design by creating movement, playing with lighting and shadows, adding ornament, and extra drama.

=== Interior ===
Floor plan of the Church of San Carlo alle Quattro Fontane.

The rise of baroque architecture prompted Borromini to bring his sculpture background to life by creating unexpected combinations of curves and rectangular forms in his work. Many baroque architects during the seventeenth century focused their design basis to fall in line with proportions of the human body. Borromini was non-classical in the sense that he based his designs on geometric figures.

The church interior is both extraordinary and complex. The three principal parts can be identified vertically as the lower order at ground level, the transition zone of the pendentives and the oval coffered dome with its oval lantern.

In the lower part of the church, the main altar is on the same longitudinal axis as the door and there are two altars on the cross axis. One altar is dedicated to Saint Michael de Sanctis, the other dedicated to Saint John Baptist of the Conception. Between these, and arranged in groups of four, sixteen columns carry a broad and continuous entablature. The arrangement seems to refer to a cross plan but all the altars are visible as the two central columns in each arrangement of four are placed on the oblique with respect to the axial ordering of the space. This creates an undulating movement effect which is enhanced by the variation in treatment of the bays between the columns with niches, mouldings, and doors. Architectural historians have described how the bay structure of this lower order can have different rhythmic readings and the underlying geometric rationale for this complex ground plan, as well as discussing the symbolism of the church and the distinctive architectural drawings of Borromini.

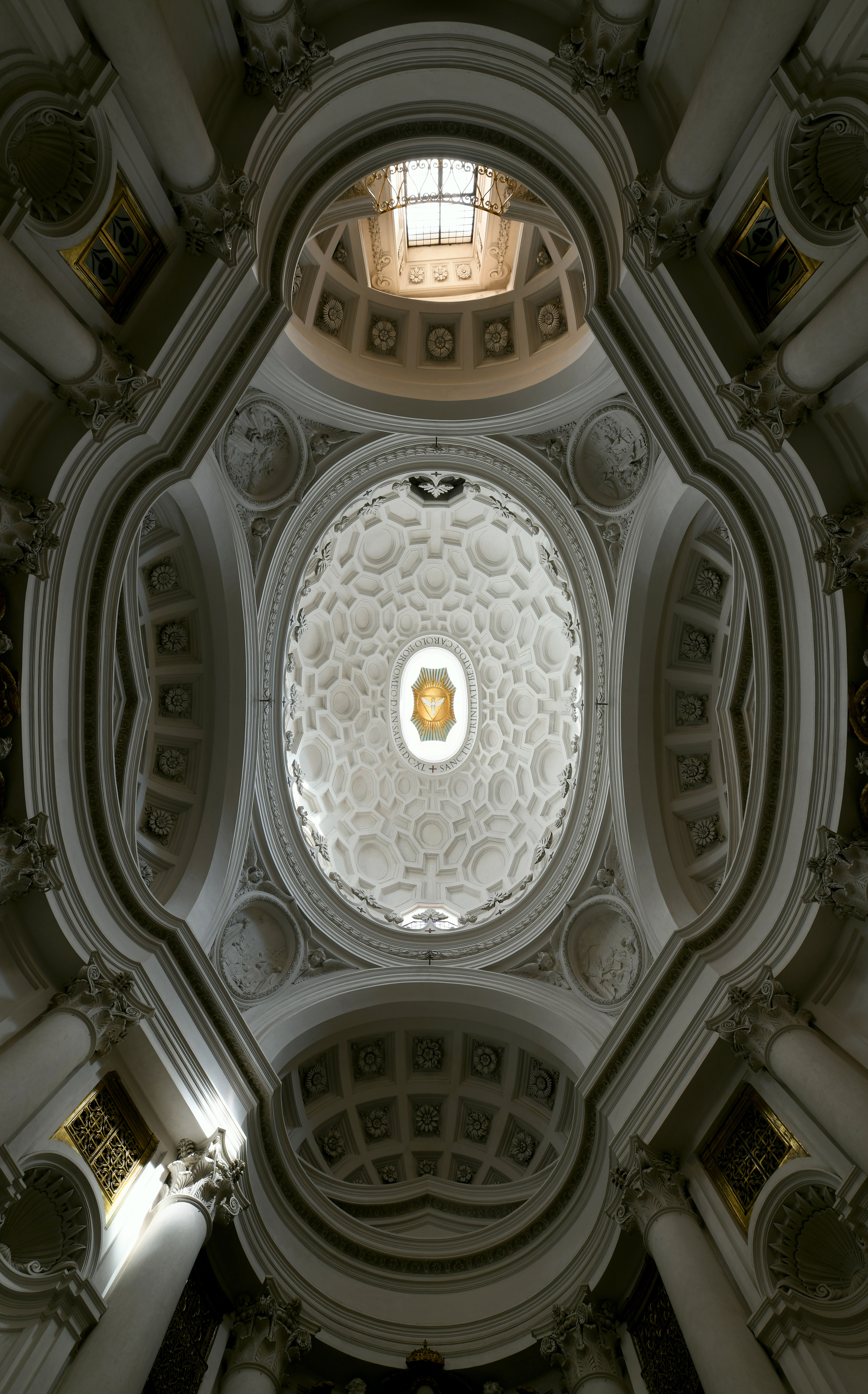
The dome with its intricate geometrical pattern

The pendentives are part of the transition area where the undulating almost cross-like form of the lower order is reconciled with the oval opening to the dome. The arches which spring from the diagonally placed columns of the lower wall order to frame the altars and entrance, rise to meet the oval entablature and so define the space of the pendentives in which roundels are set.

The oval entablature to the dome has a 'crown' of foliage and frames a view of deep set interlocking coffering of octagons, crosses and hexagons which diminish in size the higher they rise. Light floods in from windows in the lower dome that are hidden by the oval opening and from windows in the side of the lantern. In a hierarchical structuring of light, the illuminated lantern with its symbol of the Holy Trinity is the most brightly lit, the coffering of the dome is thrown into sharp and deep relief and light gradually filters downwards to the darker lower body of the church.

Flanking the apse of the main altar is a pair of identical doorways. The right door leads to the convent through which the crypts below may be accessed. The door on the left leads to an external chapel known as Capella Barberini which contains a shrine to the blessed Elisabeth Canori Mora.

=== Crypt ===
The crypt below follows the size and form of the church and has a low pierced vault. Chapels open off this space, including an octagonal chapel on the south-east side where Borromini intended to be buried. It has a major and minor niche arrangement and an undulating cornice.

=== Cloister ===
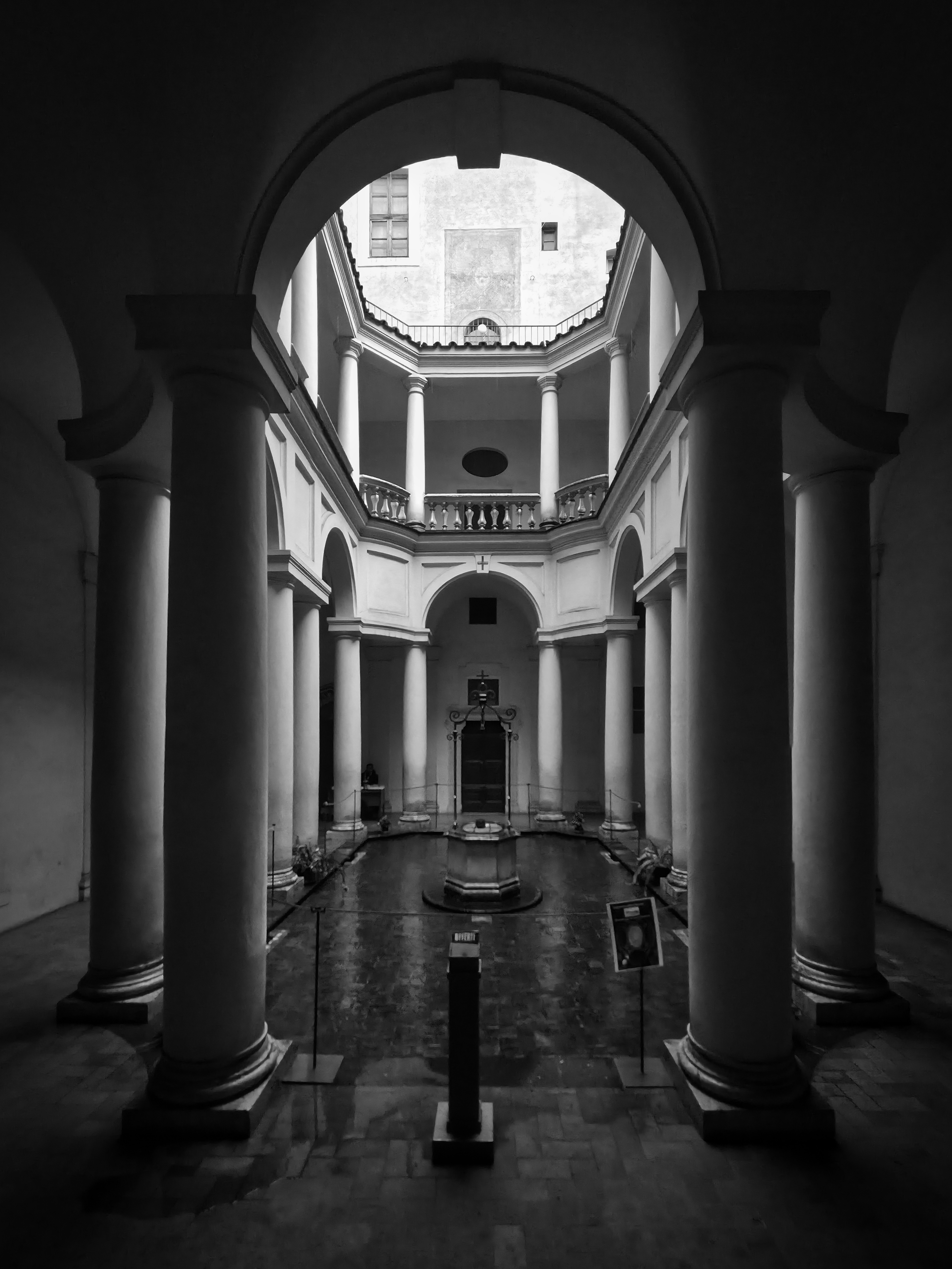
Cloister

Next to the church is the cloister, which is a two-story arrangement. The space is longer along the entrance axis than it is wide, but the rectangular ordering is interrupted by cutting the corners so it could also be understood as an elongated octagon. Further complexity is introduced by the variation in the spacing of the twelve columns carrying alternating round and flat headed openings, the curvature of the corners, and the inventive balustrade. Geometrical themes are reinforced by the central octagonal wellhead on an oval base and the octagonal capitals of the upper columns.

The most distinct break from typical rennaissance conventions is in the second floor ballustrade. To create movement, Borromini drew the balusters in a triangular form (where circles were typical). These forms alternate in an A-B pattern. This gesture is not purely aesthetic. As the architect explained, these alternatng balusters provided better visibility from the upper floor down to the ground floor.

The cloister also includes an octagonal well-head, further repeating the surrounding geometry.

Behind the church, the refectory, now the sacristy, has rounded corners, a pierced vault, windows in the garden façade and later alterations.

=== Monastery ===
The dormitory for the monks is made up of a simple block with a single-loaded corridor. Some drawings indicate Borromini had plans to ornament the facade that faces the garden - including chimneys which mimick Ionic volutes similar to Michelangelo's treatment of Porta Pia, as well as a central belvedere in the middle of the roof which was common of the era and region.

The refectory is the first of Borromini's designs to include distinct rounded corners in the room, which would later become a common element in his designs. The vaulted ceilings include cross-vaults over the windows, emphasized by stucco mouldings.

== See also ==
- 17th-century Western domes

== Notes ==
External videos
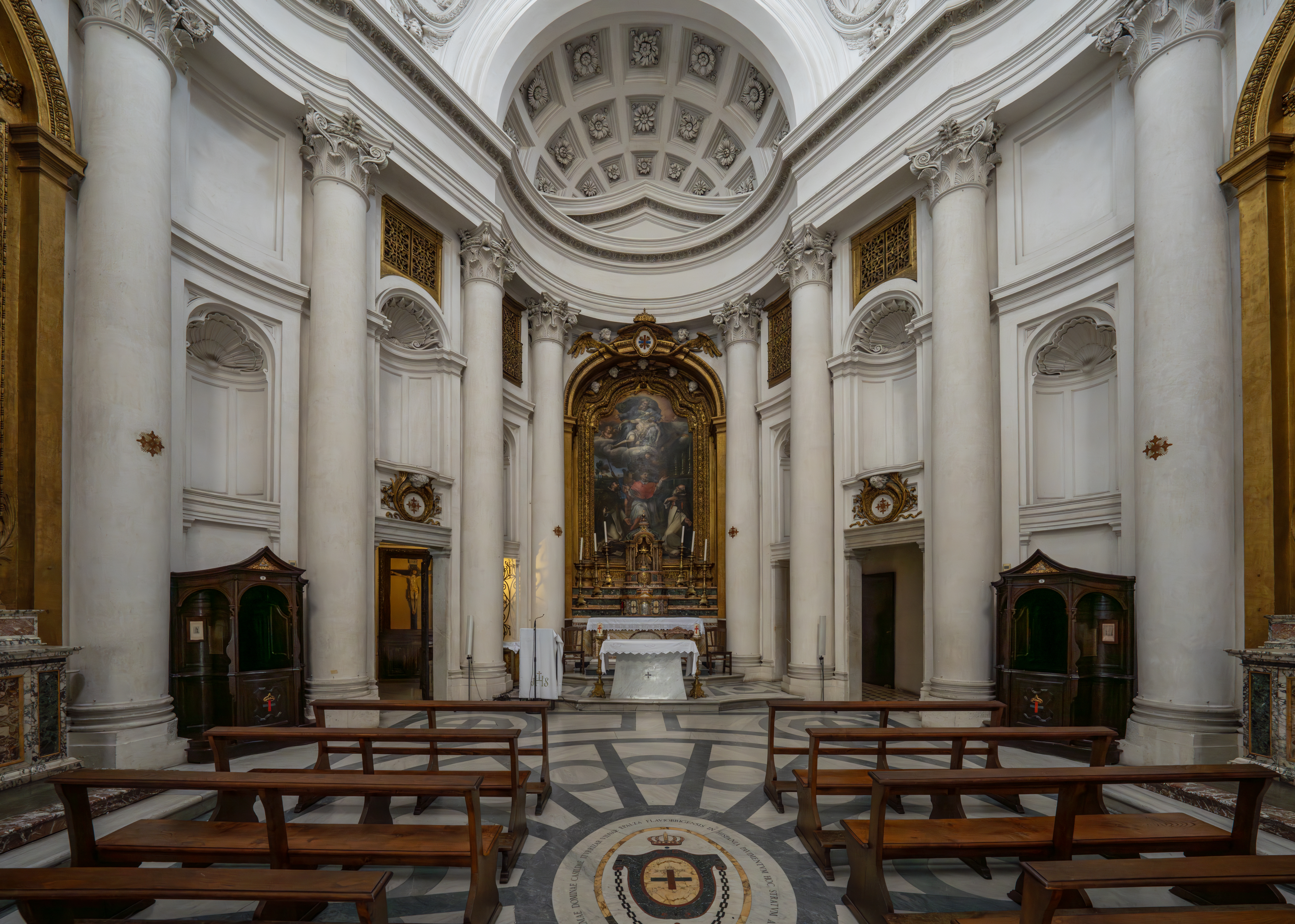
- Borromini, San Carlo alle Quattro Fontane, Smarthistory
