= Bartolomeo Maria Dal Monte =

Italian Roman Catholic priest

Blessed Bartolomeo Maria Dal Monte

Priest
- Born: 4 November 1726; Bologna, Papal Legations
- Died: 24 December 1778 (aged 52); Bologna, Papal Legations
- Venerated in: Roman Catholic Church
- Beatified: 27 September 1997, Saint Peter's Square, Vatican City by Pope John Paul II
- Feast: 24 December
- Attributes: Priest's cassock; Crucifix
- Patronage: Missionaries; Opera Pia Mission; Preachers

Bartolomeo Maria Dal Monte (3 November 1726 – 24 December 1778) was an Italian Roman Catholic priest who exercised his pastoral mission in his home town of Bologna. He established the Opera Pia Mission as part of the missions.

He preached in around 62 Italian dioceses and founded his own to prepare diocesan priests for the missions with the emphasis that Jesus Christ was the center of all missionaries as integral to the function of the missions. He emulated the example of Leonardo da Porto Maurizio for his preaching abilities.

Dal Monte was beatified on 27 September 1997.

== Life ==
Bartolomeo Maria Dal Monte was born in Bologna on 3 November 1726 as the fifth child to the peasant Anna Maria Bassani. Four of his siblings had died earlier before him. His birth and first week of life was a success after his mother requested the intercession of Francis of Paola.

His childhood was one in which his parents protected him as their most precious addition. He received his Confirmation on 26 April 1733 from the Archbishop of Bologna Cardinal Prospero Lorenzo Lambertini who became Pope Benedict XIV. He commenced his studies under the Jesuits and studied humanities. His religious calling soon formed and he informed his parents of this to which his father opposed. He had chosen Leonardo da Porto Maurizio as his model and devoted himself to the priesthood.

He was ordained to the priesthood on 20 December 1749. He served as a diocesan administrator in 1749 at the behest of Pope Benedict XIV. The latter also requested that Dal Monte continue his studies and he graduated in theological studies on 30 December 1751. He undertook work for the missions and preached in a total of 62 Italian dioceses. In 1774 the Cardinal Vicar of Rome Marcantonio Colonna called him to preach in Piazza Navona for the Jubilee of 1775. He established the Opera Pia Missions in order to prepare the diocesan priests for the missions.

Pope Pius VI wanted Dal Monte to take up residence in Rome but he refused to cease his mission of evangelization. He even offered to travel to the missions in India but his superiors dissuaded him to do so due to his precarious state of health. He continued work in his own mission and wanted its members to be apostles of Christ as those on hand to preach to all.

Dal Monte predicted that he would die at Christmas and the prediction came to pass for he died hours before on 24 December 1778 after the Archbishop of Bologna Andrea Gioannetti visited him.

== Beatification ==
The beatification process commenced under Pope Leo XIII on 22 January 1890 with the commencement of two local diocesan processes in Bologna that granted him the posthumous title Servant of God - the first stage in the process. It saw the collection of documentation and witness testimonies in order to compile the Positio for evaluation in Rome. Both processes were ratified before the documents could be sent to the Congregation of Rites.

Pope Benedict XV proclaimed him to be Venerable on 23 January 1921 after he recognized that Dal Monte had lived a life of heroic virtue.

Pope John Paul II approved a miracle attributed to his intercession on 11 June 1995 and beatified him on 27 September 1997.
