= Trinitarians =

Catholic religious order

- Order of the Most Holy Trinity and of the Captives
- Latin: Ordo Sanctissimae Trinitatis et Captivorum
- Flag of the Trinitarians

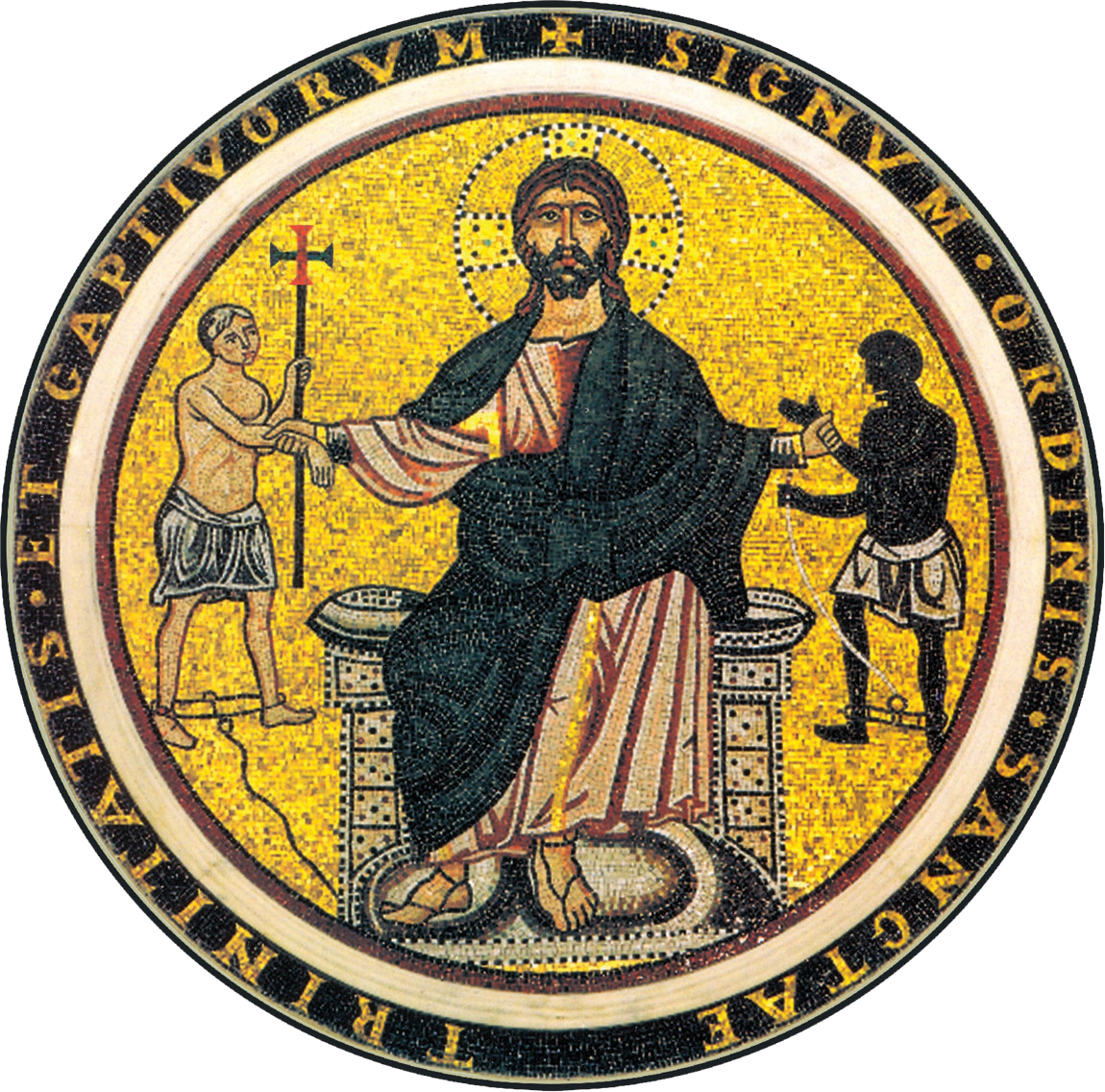
- Mosaic of Jesus Christ used as the emblem of the Trinitarians
- Abbreviation: OSsT
- Nickname: Trinitarians
- Formation: 17 December 1198; 827 years ago
- Founders: John of Matha and Felix of Valois
- Type: Mendicant order
- Purpose: To ransom Christian captives
- Headquarters: Basilica of San Crisogono Rome, Italy
- Members: 610 (415 priests) (2018)
- Minister General: Luigi Buccarello, OSsT
- Parent organization: Catholic Church
- Website: trinitari.org

The Trinitarians, formally known as the Order of the Most Holy Trinity and of the Captives (Latin: Ordo Sanctissimae Trinitatis et Captivorum; abbreviated OSsT), is a mendicant order of the Catholic Church for men founded in Cerfroid, outside Paris, in the late 12th century, and approved by Pope Innocent in 1198. In addition to its purpose of ransoming Christian captives, a special dedication to the mystery of the Holy Trinity has been a constitutive element of the order's life from the very outset.

Papal documents refer to the founder only as "Brother John", but tradition identifies him as John of Matha, whose feast day is celebrated on 17 December. The founding-intention for the order was the ransom of Christians held captive by Muslims, a consequence of crusading and of piracy along the Mediterranean coast of Europe.

== Background ==
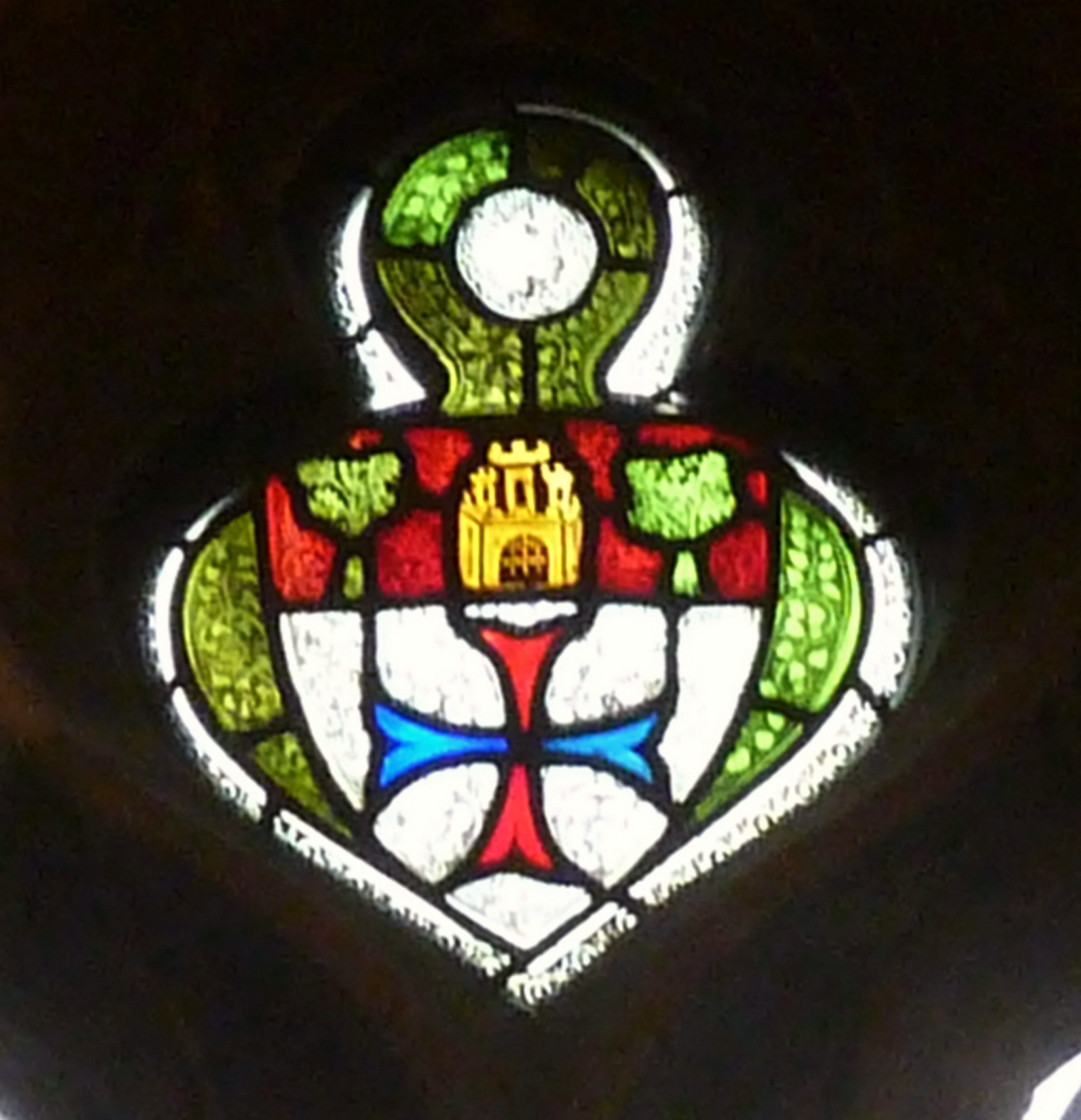
14th century Trinitarian cross at St Robert's Church, Pannal

Between the eighth and the fifteenth centuries medieval Europe was in a state of intermittent warfare between the Christian kingdoms of southern Europe and the Muslim polities of North Africa, Southern France, Sicily and portions of Spain. According to James W. Brodman, the threat of capture, whether by pirates or coastal raiders, or during one of the region's intermittent wars, was a continuous threat to residents of Catalonia, Languedoc, and the other coastal provinces of medieval Christian Europe. Raids by militias, bands, and armies from both sides was an almost annual occurrence.

The redemption of captives is listed among the corporal works of mercy. The period of the Crusades, when so many Christians were in danger of falling into the hands of Muslims, witnessed the rise of religious orders vowed exclusively to this pious work.

== History ==
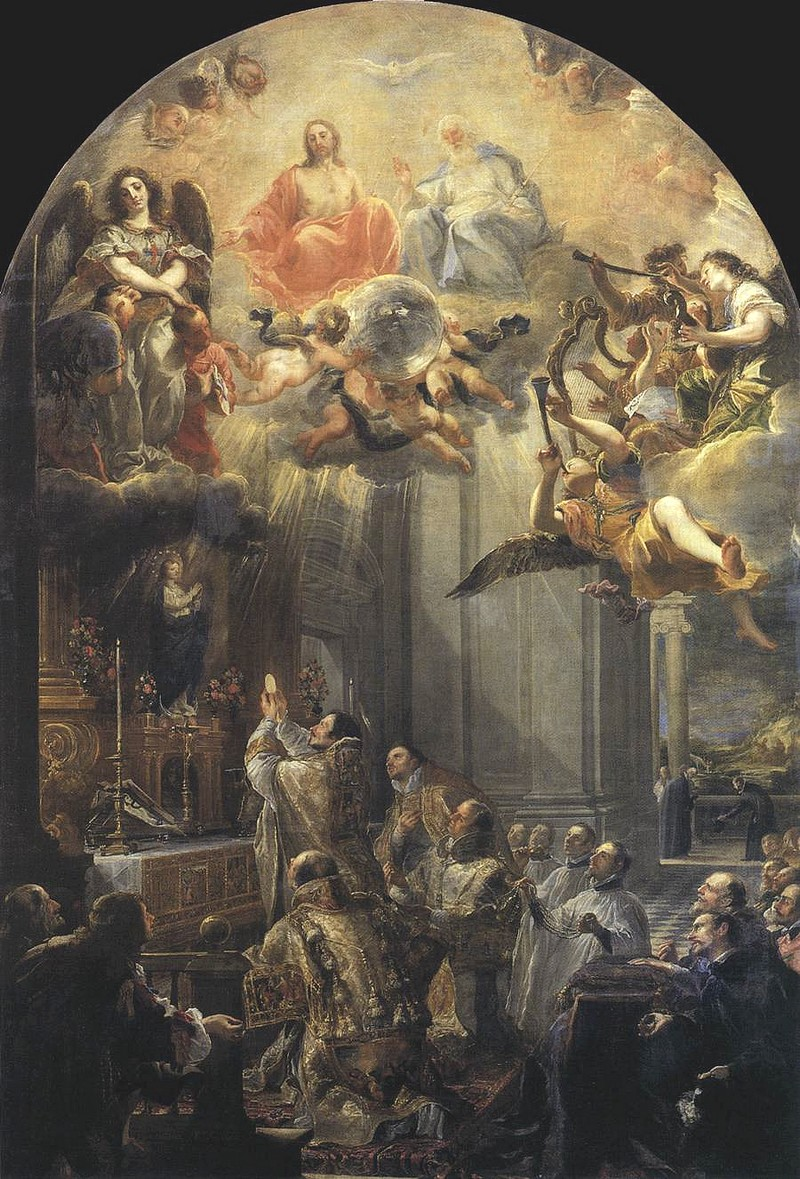
Juan Carreño de Miranda. Founding of Trinitarian Order (Mass of St John of Matha)

The Order of the Trinitarians (Order of the Holy Trinity and Captives) was founded by St. John de Matha after his vision of Christ with two captives around 1193. Pope Innocent III granted the order and its rule approval with his letter Operante divine dispositionis clementia, issued on 17 December 1198. Soon after papal approbation, the Trinitarian ministry to Christian captives was incorporated into the Order's title: Order of the Holy Trinity and of Captives. In addition to the Order's purpose of ransoming Christian captives, each local community of Trinitarians served the people of its area. And so, their ministry included hospitality, care of the sick and poor, churches, education, etc. Eventually, the Trinitarians also assumed the work of evangelization.

Brother John's founding intention expanded quickly beyond the three initial foundations (at Cerfroid, Planels, and Bourg-la-Reine) into a considerable network of houses committed to the ransom of Christian captives and other works of mercy conducted in their locales.

Trinitarian tradition considers St. Felix of Valois co-founder of the Order; he was a companion of John of Matha at Cerfroid, near Paris. In Cerfroid the first Trinitarian community was established and it is considered the mother house of the whole Order. Among the earliest recruits were some Englishmen, and the first to go on the special mission of the order were two English friars, who in 1200 went to Morocco and returned to France with 186 liberated Christian captives.

The first generation of Trinitarians could count some fifty foundations. In northern France, the Trinitarians were known as "Mathurins" because they were based in the church of Saint-Mathurin in Paris from 1228 onwards. Ransoming captives required economic resources. Fundraising and economic expertise constituted important aspects of the Order's life. The Rule's requirement of "the tertia pars", or setting aside one-third of all income for the ransom of Christian captives, became a noted characteristic of the Order.

Louis IX installed a house of the Order in the royal palace (château) at Fontainebleau. He chose Trinitarians as his chaplains, and was accompanied by them on his crusades. The Master of the Trinity was taken captive together with Louis IX after the Battle of Al Mansurah.

The Order of the Most Holy Trinity has its own rule of life approved by Pope Innocent III in 1198. The habit was white, with the red and blue cross depicted above on the breast. Through the centuries, the Trinitarian Rule underwent several revisions, notably in 1267 and in 1631. It has been complemented by statutes and constitutions. The thirteenth century was a time of vitality, whereas the following centuries brought periods of difficulty and even decline in some areas. The Council of Trent (1545–1563) was a major turning-point in the life of the Catholic Church. Its twenty-fifth session dealt with regulars and nuns and the reform of religious orders. Reforming interests and energies manifested themselves among Trinitarians in France with the foundation at Pontoise, north of Paris, during the last quarter of the sixteenth century. Reform-minded Trinitarians in Spain first established the movement known as the Recollection and then, at the very end of the sixteenth century, under the leadership of St. John Baptist of the Conception, a movement at Valdepeñas (Ciudad Real) known as the Spanish Discalced Trinitarians. Far-reaching periods of growth and development followed this rebirth, and at the beginning of the 18th century there were still 250 houses.

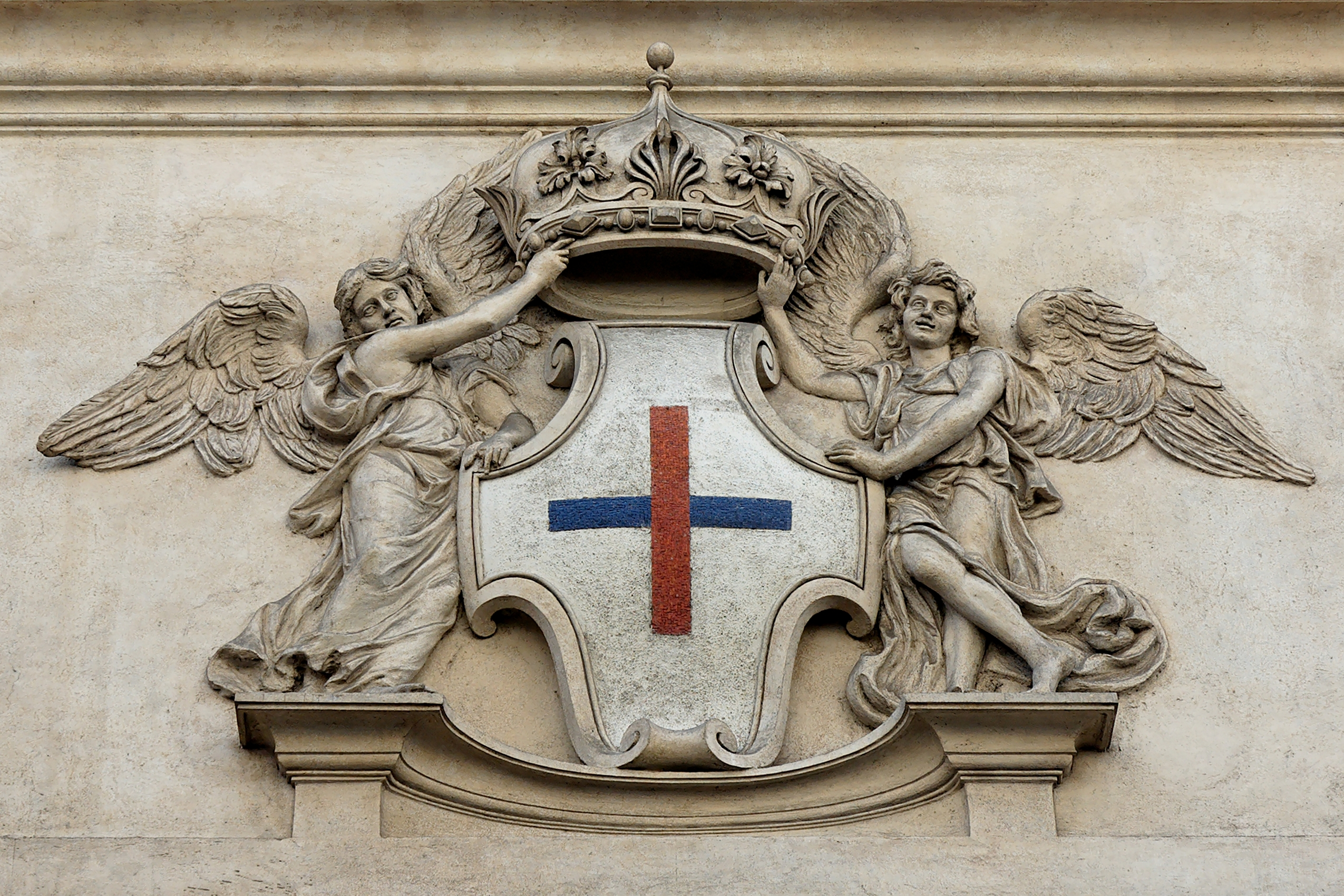
Stone shield of the Trinitarian Order on the façade of San Carlo alle Quattro Fontane (1638–1641) in Rome.

In succeeding centuries, modern European events such as revolution, government suppression and civil war had very serious consequences for the Trinitarian Order, and it declined significantly in terms of professed membership and number of active houses. During the last decades of the nineteenth century, the Trinitarians began to grow slowly again in Italy and Spain. Its members continue to dedicate themselves in present times to fostering and promoting devotion to the Holy Trinity, evangelising non-Christians, assisting immigrants, educating the young, and to parish work.

== The Trinitarian family ==
Today the Trinitarian family is composed of priests, brothers, cloistered nuns and religious sisters as well as committed laity. Members of the Trinitarian family include the Trinitarian religious; the Trinitarian nuns; the Trinitarian Sisters of Valence; the Trinitarian Sisters of Rome, Valencia, Madrid, Mallorca, and Seville; the Oblates of the Most Holy Trinity; the Third Order Secular (tertiaries) and other Trinitarian laity. All are distinguished by the cross of red and blue which dates from the origins of the Order. Trinitarians are found throughout Europe and in the Americas as well as in Africa, India, Korea and the Philippines.

=== Third Order Secular of the Most Holy Trinity ===
In 2000 the Vatican Congregation for Institutes of Consecrated Life and Societies of Apostolic Life approved "The Trinitarian Way", a rule of life which would guide all the lay groups associated with the Trinitarians: the Third Order Secular, the Trinitarian Movement, Confraternities, etc.

There have been tertiaries of the Order of the Most Holy Trinity and of the Captives since the beginnings of the Order though they were not known by that name. Lay confreres were admitted already in 1198 by the permission of Pope Innocent III. Statutes attributed to William the Scotsman, the third Minister General of the Order (1217–1222), give some idea of the primitive organization of the Trinitarian Fraternity. In the 1203 contract between the Bishop of Arles and St. John de Matha, reference is made to affiliates of the convent. There were Trinitarian Confraternities, of the Redemption, and of Our Lady of Remedy aggregated to the Order.

The first known Statutes of the Trinitarian Third Order were published in 1584, and were approved by the General of the Order, Father Bernard Dominici. The first Rule of Life for the Third Order attached to the Discalced Trinitarians was approved by Pope Leo XII on 6 June 1828.

== Charism ==
The Glory of the Most Holy Trinity and the ransom of Christian Captives. Along with the Order's mission of ransoming Christian captives, each Trinitarian Community served the people of its area by performing works of mercy; redemption and mercy are at the center of the Trinitarian charism.

== Our Lady of Good Remedy ==
Our Lady of Good Remedy is the patroness of the Order of the Most Holy Trinity. Devotion to Mary under this ancient title is widely known in Europe and Latin America. Her feast day is celebrated on 8 October.

== Scapular of the Most Blessed Trinity ==
The Scapular of the Holy Trinity is a devotional scapular associated with the Confraternity of The Holy Trinity and the Third Order Secular of the Most Holy Trinity. It is a white scapular with a cross of which the transverse shaft is blue and the longitudinal shaft red. It is worn by Tertiaries as well as members of the Confraternity of the Blessed Trinity (or other Trinitarian associations that make use of the scapular) after investment with this scapular. It is a sign of consecration to the Holy Trinity and of fraternity.

== Saints, Blesseds, and other holy people ==
Saints

- Felix of Valois (16 April 1127 – 4 November 1212), founder of the Order, canonized on 21 October 1666
- John de Matha (23 June 1160 – 17 December 1213), founder of the Order, canonized on 21 October 1666
- Laura of Constantinople (c. 1400 - 29 May 1453), abbess who was matyred during the Fall of Constantinople
- John Baptist of the Conception (10 July 1561 – 14 February 1613), founder of the Order of Discalced Trinitarians, canonized on 25 May 1975
- Michael of the Saints (Michael de Sanctis) (29 Semptember 1591 – 10 April 1625), patron of cancer patients, canonized on 8 June 1862
- Simon de Rojas (28 October 1552 – 29 September 1624), priest and "Apostle of the Ave Maria", canonized on 3 July 1988

Blesseds

- Marcos Criado Guelamo (25 April 1522 – 25 September 1569), martyr, beatified on 24 June 1899
- Elisabetta Canori Mora (21 November 1774 – 5 February 1825), Secular Trinitarian, beatified on 24 April 1994
- Anna Maria Giannetti Taigi (29 May 1769 – 9 June 1837), Secular Trinitarian, beatified on 30 May 1920
- Dominic Iturrate of the Blessed Sacrament (11 May 1901 – 7 April 1927), priest, beatified on 30 October 1983
- Hermenegildo Iza Aregita of the Assumption and 5 Companions (died 27 August 1936), Martyrs of the Spanish Civil War from Ciudad Real, beatified on 13 October 2013
- Mariano Altolaguirre y Altolaguirre of Saint Joseph and 9 Companions (died between July 1936 to April 1937), Martyrs of the Spanish Civil War from Cuenca and Jaen, beatified on 28 October 2007

Venerables

- Rodrigo Bustos Sánchez (Tomás of the Virgin) (21 January 1587 – 7 October 1647), priest, declared venerable on 22 September 1805
- Francisco de Asís Méndez Casariego (21 June 1850 – 1 April 1924), founder of the Trinitarian Sisters of Madrid, declared venerable on 2 April 1993
- María Ana Allsopp González-Manrique (Mariana of the Holy Trinity) (24 November 1854 15 March 1933), cofounder of the Trinitarian Sisters of Madrid, declared venerable on 21 May 2022
- Maria Cäcilia Autsch (Angela Maria of the Sacred Heart of Jesus) (26 March 1900 – 23 December 1944), professed religious of the Trinitarian Sisters of Valence, declared venerable on 19 May 2018
- Félix Monasterio Ateca of the Virgin (2 May 1902 – 17 January 1951), priest, declared venerable on 26 March 1994
- Giuseppe di Donna (23 August 1901 – 2 January 1952), Bishop of Andria, declared venerable on 3 July 2008

Servants of God

- Juan del Aguila (early February 1553 5 June 1613), martyred in Algeria
- Juan Maroto García of Saint Joseph (7 September 1586 – 1 January 1616), priest
- Juan de Palacios (c. 1560 20 September 1616), martyred in Algeria
- Bernardo de Monroy (c. 1559 – 31 July 1622), martyred in Algeria
- Angela María Tabares Martínez of the Conception (1 March 1649 13 April 1690), professed religious of the Trinitarian Nuns and reformer
- Anna Cucchiari (Maria Teresa of the Holy Trinity) (10 November 1734 – 10 June 1801), founder of the Sisters of the Most Holy Trinity (Trinitarian Sisters of Rome), declared a Servant of God on 16 February 1996
- Marie-Magdeleine-Euphrasie Hugon (Marie-Séraphia) (10 April 1828 – 17 March 1900), professed religious of the Trinitarian Sisters of Valence
- Félix de Uriarte Olaeta de la Sagrada Familia (12 October 1903 – 23 July 1936), Martyr of the Spanish Civil War from the Diocese of Malaga, declared a Servant of God on 27 September 2016

== See also ==
- Angelo Buccarello
- DeMatha Catholic High School, the only college preparatory and secondary educational school in the Americas run by the Trinitarian Order
- Order of the Blessed Virgin Mary of Mercy
- San Tommaso in Formis, the Trinitarian church in Rome
- San Carlo alle Quattro Fontane in Rome
- List of Ministers General of the Trinitarian Order

== Sources ==
- Witko, Andrew. The Order of the Holy Trinity and Captives, 2008
