= List of people beatified by Pope Francis =

From his election in 2013 until his death in 2025, Pope Francis authorized the beatification of 1,541 people, including three equipollent beatifications.

The pope has continued the practice of having beatifications celebrated in the place of the individual's origin, although he has presided over beatifications himself on three occasions: for Paul Yun Ji-Chung and 123 companions, for his predecessor Pope Paul VI, and for two Colombian martyrs.

The names listed below are from the Holy See website and are listed by year, then date. The locations given are the locations of the beatification ceremonies, not necessarily the birthplaces or homelands of the beatified.

== 2013–2016 ==
=== 7 April 2013, Córdoba, Spain ===
- Cristobal of Saint Catherine (1638–1690)

=== 13 April 2013, Venice, Italy ===
- Luca Passi (1789–1866)

=== 21 April 2013, Sondrio, Italy ===
- Nicolò Rusca (1563–1618)

=== 4 May 2013, Baependi, Minas Gerais, Brazil ===
- Francisca de Paula de Jesus (1810–1895)

=== 11 May 2013, Rome, Italy ===
- Luigi Novarese (1914–1984)

=== 25 May 2013, Palermo, Sicily, Italy ===
- Giuseppe Puglisi (1937–1993)

=== 9 June 2013, Kraków, Poland ===
- Zofia Czeska-Maciejowska (1584–1650)
- Małgorzata Szewczyk (1828–1905)

=== 15 June 2013, Carpi, Modena, Italy ===
- Odoardo Focherini (1907–1944)

=== 31 August 2013, Bucharest, Romania ===
- Vladimir Ghika (1873–1954)

=== 2 September 2013, Santa Lucia del Mela, Messina, Italy ===
- Antonio Franco (1585–1626)

=== 7 September 2013, Rovigo, Italy ===
- Maria Bolognesi (1924–1980)

=== 14 September 2013, Córdoba, Argentina ===
- José Gabriel del Rosario Brochero (1840–1914) (canonized on 16 October 2016)

=== 21 September 2013, Bergamo, Italy ===
- Tommaso da Olera (1563–1631)

=== 28 September 2013, Istria, Croatia ===
- Miroslav Bulešić (1920–1947)

=== 5 October 2013, Modena, Italy ===
- Rolando Rivi (1931–1945)

=== 13 October 2013, Tarragona, Spain ===
- 522 Spanish Martyrs (+1934, 1936–1939)

=== 19 October 2013, Budapest, Hungary ===
- István Sándor (1914–1953)

=== 10 November 2013, Paderborn, Germany ===
- Maria Theresia Bonzel (1830–1905)

=== 25 January 2014, Naples, Italy ===
- Maria Cristina of Savoy (1812–1836)

=== 26 April 2014, Alba, Cuneo, Italy ===
- Giuseppe Girotti (1905–1945)

=== 17 May 2014, Iași, Romania ===
- Anton Durcovici (1888–1951)

=== 24 May 2014, Aversa, Caserta, Italy ===
- Mario Vergara (1910–1950)
- Isidore Ngei Ko Lat (1918–1950)

=== 31 May 2014, Collevallenza, Perugia, Italy ===
- Maria Josefa Alhama y Valera (1893–1983)

=== 16 August 2014, Seoul, South Korea ===
- Paul Yun Ji-Chung & 123 Companions (+1791–1868)

=== 4 October 2014, Newark, New Jersey, United States ===
- Teresa Demjanovich (1901–1927)

=== 12 October 2014, Sassari, Italy ===
- Francesco Zirano (1564–1603)

=== 19 October 2014, Saint Peter's Square, Vatican City ===
- Pope Paul VI (1897–1978) (canonized on 14 October 2018)

=== 25 October 2014, São Paulo, Brazil ===
- Assunta Marchetti (1871–1948)

=== 1 November 2014, Vitoria, Spain ===
- Pedro Asúa Mendía (1890–1936)

=== 26 April 2015, Rimouski, Canada ===
- Marie-Élisabeth Turgeon (1840–1881)

=== 2 May 2015, Turin, Italy ===
- Luigi Bordino (1922–1977)

=== 16 May 2015, Venice, Italy ===
- Luigi Caburlotto (1817–1897)

=== 23 May 2015 ===
==== San Salvador, El Salvador ====
- Óscar Romero (1917–1980) (canonized on 14 October 2018)

==== Nyeri, Kenya ====
- Irene Stefani (1891–1930)

=== 31 May 2015, Bayonne, France ===
- Louis-Édouard Cestac (1801–1868)

=== 29 August 2015, Harissa, Lebanon ===
- Flaviano Michele Melki (1858–1915)

=== 5 September 2015, Girona, Spain ===
- Maria Dolores Oller Angelats & 2 Companions (+1936)

=== 13 September 2015, Limpopo, South Africa ===
- Benedict Daswa (1946–1990)

=== 19 September 2015, San Miniato, Italy ===
- Pio Alberto del Corona (1837–1912)

=== 27 September 2015, Kraków, Poland ===
- Ludwika Szczęsna (1863–1916)

=== 3 October 2015, Santander, Spain ===
- Julián Heredia Zubía & 17 Companions (+1936)

=== 31 October 2015, Frascati, Italy ===
- Maria Teresa Casini (1864–1937)

=== 14 November 2015, Três Pontas, Minas Gerais, Brazil ===
- Francisco de Paula Victor (1827–1905)

=== 21 November 2015, Barcelona, Spain ===
- Frederic Tarrés Puigpelat & 25 Companions (+1936–1937)

=== 5 December 2015, Chimbote, Peru ===
- Michał Tomaszek (1960–1991)
- Zbigniew Adam Strzałkowski (1958–1991)
- Alessandro Dordi (1931–1991)

=== 23 April 2016, Burgos, Spain ===
- Valentín Palencia Marquina & 4 Companions (+1937)

=== 21 May 2016, Cosenza, Italy ===
- Francesco Maria Greco (1857–1931)

=== 11 June 2016, Vercelli, Italy ===
- Giacomo Abbondo (1720–1788)

=== 12 June 2016, Monreale, Italy ===
- Carolina Santocanale (1852–1923) (canonized on 15 May 2022)

=== 18 June 2016, Foggia, Italy ===
- Giulia Crostarosa (1696–1755)

=== 27 August 2016, Santiago del Estero, Argentina ===
- María Antonia de Paz y Figueroa (1730–1799) (canonized on 11 February 2024)

=== 11 September 2016, Karaganda, Kazakhstan ===
- Władysław Bukowiński (1904–1974)

=== 17 September 2016, Codrongianos, Italy ===
- Elisabetta Sanna Porcu (1788–1857)

=== 24 September 2016, Würzburg, Germany ===
- Engelmar Unzeitig (1911–1945)

=== 8 October 2016, Oviedo, Spain ===
- Genaro Fueyo Castañon & 3 Companions (+1936)

=== 29 October 2016, Madrid, Spain ===
- José Antón Gómez & 3 Companions (+1936)

=== 5 November 2016, Shkodër, Albania ===
- Nikollë Prennushi & 37 Companions (+1945–1974)

=== 19 November 2016, Avignon, France ===
- Marie-Eugène de l'Enfant-Jésus (1894–1967)

=== 11 December 2016, Vientiene, Laos ===
- Joseph Thạo Tiến and 16 Companions (+1954–1970)

== 2017–2020 ==
=== 7 February 2017, Osaka, Japan ===
- Takayama Ukon (ca. 1552–1615)

=== 18 March 2017, Bolzano, Italy ===
- Josef Mayr-Nusser (1910–1945)

=== 25 March 2017, Almería, Spain ===
- José Álvarez-Benavides de la Torre & 114 Companions (+1936–1939)

=== 22 April 2017, Oviedo, Spain ===
- Louis-Antoine-Rose Ormières Lacase (1809–1890)

=== 29 April 2017, Verona, Italy ===
- Leopoldina Naudet (1773–1834)

=== 6 May 2017, Girona, Spain ===
- Antonio Arribas Hortigüela & 6 Companions (+1936)

=== 13 May 2017, Dublin, Ireland ===
- John Sullivan (1861–1933)

=== 10 June 2017, La Spezia, Italy ===
- Itala Mela (1904–1957)

=== 25 June 2017, Vilnius, Lithuania ===
- Teofilius Matulionis (1873–1962)

=== 8 September 2017, Villavicencio, Colombia ===
- Jesús Emilio Jaramillo Monsalve (1916–1989)
- Pedro María Ramírez Ramos (1899–1948)

=== 23 September 2017, Oklahoma City, Oklahoma, United States ===
- Stanley Francis Rother (1935–1981)

=== 30 September 2017, Bratislava, Slovakia ===
- Titus Zeman (1915–1969)

=== 7 October 2017, Milan, Italy ===
- Giuseppe Antonio Migliavacca (1849–1909)

=== 21 October 2017, Barcelona, Spain ===
- Mateo Casals Mas & 108 Companions (+1936–1937)

=== 28 October 2017, Caxias do Sul, Rio Grande do Sul, Brazil ===
- Giovanni Schiavo (1903–1967)

=== 4 November 2017, Indore, India ===
- Mariam Vattalil (1954–1995)

=== 11 November 2017, Carabanchel, Madrid, Spain ===
- Vicenç Queralt Lloret & 20 Companions (+1936–1937)
- José Maria Fernández Sánchez & 38 Companions (+1936)

=== 18 November 2017, Detroit, Michigan, United States ===
- Solanus Casey (1870–1957)

=== 25 November 2017, Córdoba, Argentina ===
- Saturnina Rodríguez de Zavalía (1823–1896)

=== 3 February 2018, Vigevano, Italy ===
- Teresio Olivelli (1916–1945)

=== 15 April 2018, Vohipeno, Madagascar ===
- Lucien Botovasoa (1908–1947)

=== 28 April 2018, Kraków, Poland ===
- Hanna Helena Chrzanowska (1902–1973)

=== 1 May 2018, Szombathely, Hungary ===
- János Brenner (1931–1957)

=== 5 May 2018, Aachen, Germany ===
- Clara Fey (1815–1894)

=== 26 May 2018, Piacenza, Italy ===
- Leonella Sgorbati (1940–2006)

=== 2 June 2018, Naples, Italy ===
- Maria Gargani (1892–1973)

=== 10 June 2018, Agen, France ===
- Adèle de Batz de Trenquelléon (1789–1828)

=== 16 June 2018, Caracas, Venezuela ===
- Carmen Elena Rendiles Martínez (1903–1977) (canonized on 19 October 2025)

=== 23 June 2018, Barrio Obrero, Asunción, Paraguay ===
- María Guggiari Echeverría (1925–1959)

=== 1 September 2018, Košice, Slovakia ===
- Anna Kolesárová (1928–1944)

=== 9 September 2018, Strasbourg, France ===
- Alphonse-Marie Eppinger (1814–1867)

=== 22 September 2018, Nisiporești, Romania ===
- Veronica Antal (1935–1958)

=== 30 September 2018, Marseille, France ===
- Jean-Baptiste Fouque (1851–1926)

=== 20 October 2018, Málaga, Spain ===
- Tiburcio Arnáiz Muñoz (1865–1926)

=== 27 October 2018, Izabal, Guatemala ===
- Marcello Maruzzo (1929–1981)
- Luis Navarro (1950–1981)

=== 3 November 2018, Rome, Italy ===
- Clelia Merloni (1861–1930)

=== 7 November 2018, Vatican City (Equipollent beatification) ===
- Michał Giedroyć (1420–1485)

=== 10 November 2018, Barcelona, Spain ===
- Teodoro Illera del Olmo & 15 Companions (+1936–1937)

=== 8 December 2018, Oran, Algeria ===
- Pierre Claverie & 18 Companions (+1994–1996)

=== 9 March 2019, Oviedo, Spain ===
- Angel Cuartas Cristóbal & 8 Companions (+1934, 1936–1937)

=== 23 March 2019, Tarragona, Spain ===
- Mariano Mullerat i Soldevila (1897–1936)

=== 27 April 2019, La Rioja, Argentina ===
- Carlos de Dios Murias (1945–1976)
- Gabriel Longueville (1931–1976)
- Wenceslao Pedernera (1936–1976)
- Enrique Angelelli (1923–1976)

=== 4 May 2019, Mexico City, Mexico ===
- María Concepción Cabrera Arias de Armida (1862–1937)

=== 18 May 2019, Madrid, Spain ===
- Guadalupe Ortiz de Landázuri Fernández de Heredia (1916–1975)

=== 2 June 2019, Blaj, Romania ===
- Vasile Aftenie (1899–1950)
- Valeriu Traian Frentiu (1875–1952)
- Ioan Suciu (1907–1953)
- Tit Liviu Chinezu (1904–1955)
- Ioan Balan (1880–1959)
- Alexandru Rusu (1884–1963)
- Iuliu Hossu (1885–1970)

=== 15 June 2019, Pozzomaggiore, Italy ===
- Edvige Carboni (1880–1952)

=== 22 June 2019, Madrid, Spain ===
- María Isabel Lacaba Andia & 13 Companions (+1936)

=== 14 September 2019, Forlì, Italy ===
- Benedetta Bianchi Porro (1936–1964)

=== 15 September 2019, Limburg, Germany ===
- Richard Henkes (1900–1945)

=== 19 October 2019, Crema, Italy ===
- Alfredo Cremonesi (1902–1953)

=== 9 November 2019, Granada, Spain ===
- María Emilia Riquelme y Zayas (1847–1940)

=== 16 November 2019, Riobamba, Ecuador ===
- Victor Emilio Moscoso Cárdenas (1846–1897)

=== 23 November 2019, Tambaú, Brazil ===
- Donizetti Tavares de Lima (1882–1961)

=== 7 December 2019, Huehuetenango, Guatemala ===
- James Alfred Miller (1944–1982)

=== 26 September 2020, Naples, Italy ===
- Maria Velotti (1826–1886)

=== 4 October 2020, Bologna, Italy ===
- Olinto Marella (1882–1969)

=== 10 October 2020, Assisi, Italy ===
- Carlo Acutis (1991–2006) (canonized on 7 September 2025)

=== 31 October 2020, Hartford, Connecticut, United States ===
- Michael Joseph McGivney (1852–1890)

=== 7 November 2020, Barcelona, Spain ===
- Joan Roig i Diggle (1917–1936)

== 2021–2025 ==
=== 17 April 2021, Veroli, Italy ===
- Simèon-Marie Cardon & 5 Companions (+1799)

=== 23 April 2021, Santa Cruz del Quiché, Guatemala ===
- José María Gran Cirera & 9 Companions (+1980–1991)

=== 30 April 2021, Caracas, Venezuela ===
- José Gregorio Hernández (1864–1919) (canonized on 19 October 2025)

=== 9 May 2021, Agrigento, Italy ===
- Rosario Angelo Livatino (1952–1990)

=== 15 May 2021, Rome, Italy ===
- Johann Baptist Jordan (1848–1918)

=== 29 May 2021, Astorga, Spain ===
- María Pilar Gullón Yturriaga & 2 Companions (+1936)

=== 6 June 2021, Chiavenna, Italy ===
- Maria Laura Mainetti (1939–2000)

=== 4 September 2021, Catamarca, Argentina ===
- Mamerto Esquiú (1826–1883)

=== 12 September 2021, Warsaw, Poland ===
- Stefan Wyszyński (1901–1981)
- Róża Czacka (1876–1961)

=== 26 September 2021, Bologna, Italy ===
- Giovanni Fornasini (1915–1944)

=== 3 October 2021, Catanzaro, Italy ===
- Gaetana Tolomeo (1936–1997)
- Mariantonia Samà (1875–1953)

=== 9 October 2021, Naples, Italy ===
- Maria Llorença Llong (1463–1539)

=== 10 October 2021, Tropea, Italy ===
- Francesco Mottola (1901–1969)

=== 16 October 2021, Córdoba, Spain ===
- Juan Elías Medina & 126 Companions (+1936–1939)

=== 23 October 2021, Brescia, Italy ===
- Maria Ripamonti (1909–1954)

=== 24 October 2021, Rimini, Italy ===
- Sandra Sabattini (1961–1984)

=== 30 October 2021, Tortosa, Spain ===
- Francisco Cástor Sojo López & 3 Companions (+1936–1938)

=== 6 November 2021, Manresa, Spain ===
- Benet Domènech Bonet & 2 Companions (+1936)

=== 20 November 2021, Katowice, Poland ===
- Jan Franciszek Macha (1914–1942)

=== 22 January 2022, San Salvador, El Salvador ===
- Rutilio Grande García (1928–1977)
- Manuel Solórzano (1905–1977)
- Nelson Lemus (1960–1977)
- Cosma Spessotto (1923–1980)

=== 26 February 2022, Granada, Spain ===
- Cayetano Giménez Martín & 15 Companions (+1936)

=== 30 April 2022, Milan, Italy ===
- Armida Barelli (1882–1952)
- Mario Ciceri (1900–1945)

=== 7 May 2022, La Florida, Peru ===
- Antonia Luzmila Rivas López (1920–1990)

=== 22 May 2022, Lyon, France ===
- Pauline Jaricot (1799–1862)

=== 28 May 2022, Modena, Italy ===
- Luigi Lenzini (1881–1945)

=== 4 June 2022, Bqennaya, Lebanon ===
- Leonard Melki (1881–1915)
- Thomas Saleh (1879–1917)

=== 11 June 2022, Wrocław, Poland ===
- Maria Magdalena Jahn & 9 Companions (+1945)

=== 18 June 2022, Almería, Spain ===
- Angel Marina Álvarez & 19 Companions (+1936)
- Juan Aguilar Donis & 5 Companions (+1936)
- Isabel Sánchez Romero (1861–1937)

=== 2 July 2022, San Ramón de la Nueva Orán, Argentina ===
- Pedro Ortiz de Zárate (1622–1683)
- Giovanni Antonio Solinas (1643–1683)

=== 16 July 2022, Ellwangen, Germany ===
- Johann Philipp Jeningen (1642–1704)

=== 4 September 2022, Saint Peter's Square, Vatican City ===
- Pope John Paul I (1912–1978)

=== 9 October 2022, Fabriano, Italy ===
- Maria Costanza Panas (1896–1963)

=== 16 October 2022, Boves, Italy ===
- Giuseppe Bernardi (1897–1943)
- Mario Ghibaudo (1920–1943)

=== 22 October 2022, Madrid, Spain ===
- Vicente Nicasio Renuncio Toribio & 11 Companions (+1936)

=== 24 October 2022, Crato, Brazil ===
- Benigna Cardoso da Silva (1928–1941)

=== 29 October 2022, Medellín, Colombia ===
- Maria Berenice Hencker (1898–1993)

=== 5 November 2022, Meru, Kenya ===
- Fiorina Cecchin (1877–1925)

=== 20 November 2022, Kalongo, Uganda ===
- Giuseppe Ambrosoli (1923–1987)

=== 10 December 2022, Barbacena, Brazil ===
- Isabel Cristina Mrad Campos (1962–1982)

=== 22 April 2023, Paris, France ===
- Henri-Mathieu Planchat & 4 Companions (+1871)

=== 6 May 2023 ===
==== Granada, Spain ====
- Maria Concepción Barrecheguren García (1901–1927)

==== Montevideo, Uruguay ====
- Jacinto Vera (1813–1881)

=== 25 June 2023, Lecce, Italy ===
- Elisabetta Martinez (1905–1991)

=== 10 September 2023, Markowa, Poland ===
- Józef and Wiktoria Ulma with Seven Children (+1944)

=== 30 September 2023, Piacenza, Italy ===
- Giuseppe Beotti (1912–1944)

=== 18 November 2023, Seville, Spain ===
- Manuel González-Serna Rodríguez & 19 Companions (+1936)

=== 16 December 2023, Luján, Argentina ===
- Eduardo Francisco Pironio (1920–1998)

=== 18 May 2024, Vatican City (Equipollent beatification) ===
- Guy de Montpellier (1160–1208)

=== 26 May 2024, Novara, Italy ===
- Giuseppe Rossi (1912–1945)

=== 15 June 2024, Kraków, Poland ===
- Michał Rapacz (1904–1946)

=== 2 August 2024, Bkerké, Lebanon ===
- Esţfān al-Dwayhī (1630–1704)

=== 18 August 2024, Uvira, Democratic Republic of the Congo ===
- Luigi Carrara & 3 Companions (+1964)

=== 31 August 2024, Šaštín-Stráže, Slovakia ===
- Ján Havlík (1928–1965)

=== 14 September 2024, Mexico City, Mexico ===
- Moisés Lira Serafín (1893–1950)

=== 29 September 2024, Brussels, Belgium ===
- Ana de Jesús (1545–1621)

=== 9 November 2024, Seville, Spain ===
- José Torres Padilla (1811–1878)

=== 16 November 2024, Shkodër, Albania ===
- Luigi Palić (1877–1913)
- John Gazulli (1893–1927)

=== 17 November 2024, Freiburg, Germany ===
- Max Josef Metzger (1887–1944)

=== 23 November 2024, Barcelona, Spain ===
- Gaetano Clausellas Ballvé (1863–1936)
- Antonio Tort Reixachs (1895–1936)

=== 25 November 2024, Vatican City (Equipollent beatification) ===
- Juana Vázquez Gutiérrez (1481–1534)

=== 12 January 2025, Rome, Italy ===
- Giovanni Merlini (1795–1873)

== See also ==
- List of people beatified by Pope Pius X
- List of people beatified by Pope Benedict XV
- List of people beatified by Pope Pius XI
- List of people beatified by Pope Pius XII
- List of people beatified by Pope John XXIII
- List of people beatified by Pope Paul VI
- List of people beatified by Pope John Paul II
- List of people beatified by Pope Benedict XVI
- List of people beatified by Pope Leo XIV
