= Martyrs of the Spanish Civil War =

Spanish Roman Catholic martyrs

Martyrs
- Born: Various
- Died: 1934, 1936-1939
- Venerated in: Catholic Church
- Beatified: 29 March 1987; 1 October 1989; 29 April 1990; 25 October 1992; 10 October 1993; 1 October 1995; 4 May 1997; 10 May 1998; 7 March 1999; 11 March 2001 by Pope John Paul II; 29 October 2005; 28 October 2007; 23 January 2010; 17 December 2011 by Pope Benedict XVI; 13 October 2013; 1 November 2014; 5 September 2015; 3 October 2015; 21 November 2015; 23 April 2016; 8 October 2016; 29 October 2016; 25 March 2017; 6 May 2017; 21 October 2017; 11 November 2017; 10 November 2018; 9 March 2019; 23 March 2019; 22 June 2019; 7 November 2020; 29 May 2021; 16 October 2021; 30 October 2021; 6 November 2021; 26 February 2022; 18 June 2022; 22 October 2022; 18 November 2023; 23 November 2024 by Pope Francis; 13 December 2025; 17 October 2026; 7 November 2026 by Pope Leo XIV
- Canonized: 21 November 1999 (Nine Martyrs of the 1934 Asturias uprising) in Rome; 4 May 2003 in Madrid by Pope John Paul II
- Feast: Various
- Attributes: Crown of martyrdom Martyr's palm Rosary
- Patronage: Persecuted Christians

During the Spanish Civil War Catholic people faced persecution from the Republican faction of the war, in part due to their support of the nationalists and the recently abolished monarchy. The Catholic Church venerates them as martyrs. More than 6,800 clerics and other Catholic people were killed in what has been dubbed the Red Terror. As of December 2025, 2,255 Spanish martyrs have been beatified; 11 of them being canonized. For some 2,000 additional martyrs, the beatification process is underway.

== Background ==
During the nineteenth and the twentieth centuries, the Catholic Church in Spain supported and was strongly supported by and associated with the Spanish monarchy. The Second Spanish Republic saw an alternation of leftist and conservative coalition governments between 1931 and 1936. Amidst the disorder caused by the military coup of July 1936, many supporters of the Republican government pointed their weapons against individuals they considered local reactionaries, including priests and nuns.

A paradoxical case for foreign Catholics was that of the Basque Nationalist Party, at the time a Catholic party from the Basque areas, who after some hesitation supported the Republican government in exchange for an autonomous government in the Basque Country. Although virtually every other group on the Republican side was involved in the anticlerical persecution, the Basques did not play a part. The Vatican diplomacy tried to orient them to the National side, explicitly supported by Cardinal Isidro Goma y Tomas, but the BNP feared the centralism of the Nationals. Some Catalan nationalists also found themselves in the same situation, such as members of de Unió Democràtica de Catalunya party whose most relevant leader, Manuel Carrasco i Formiguera was killed by the Nationalists in Burgos in 1938.

== History ==
During the Spanish Civil War of 1936–1939, and especially in the early months of the conflict, individual clergymen were executed while entire religious communities were persecuted, leading to a death toll of 13 bishops, 4,172 diocesan priests and seminarians, 2,364 monks and friars and 283 nuns, for a total of 6,832 clerical victims, as part of what is referred to as Spain's Red Terror, which has been described as "the greatest anticlerical bloodletting Europe has ever seen".

=== Pope John Paul II ===
Pope John Paul II beatified 473 martyrs in the years 1987, 1989, 1990, 1992, 1993, 1995, 1997 and 2001. Some 233 executed clergy were beatified by John Paul II on 11 March 2001. In 1999 he also canonized a Christian Brother and the nine Martyrs of Turon, the first group of Spanish Civil War martyrs to reach sainthood. Regarding the selection of Candidates, Archbishop Edward Novack from the Congregation of Saints explained in an interview with L'Osservatore Romano: "Ideologies such as Nazism or Communism serve as a context of martyrdom, but in the foreground the person stands out with his conduct, and, case by case, it is important that the people among whom the person lived should affirm and recognize his fame as a martyr and then pray to him, obtaining graces. It is not so much ideologies that concern us, as the sense of faith of the People of God, who judge the person's behavior."

=== Pope Benedict XVI ===
Benedict XVI beatified 530 martyrs in the years 2005, 2007, 2010 and 2011, with the biggest being the 498 Spanish martyrs in October 2007, in the largest beatification ceremony in the history of the Catholic Church. In this group of people, the Vatican has not included all Spanish martyrs, nor any of the 16 priests who were executed by the nationalist side in the first years of the war. This decision has caused numerous criticisms from surviving family members and several political organisations in Spain.

The beatification recognized the extraordinary fate and often brutal death of the persons involved. Some have criticized the beatifications as dishonoring non-clergy who were also killed in the war, and as being an attempt to draw attention away from the church's support of Franco (some quarters of the Church called the Nationalist cause a "crusade"). Within Spain, the Civil War still raises high emotions. The act of beatification has also coincided in time with the debate on the Law of Historical Memory (about the treatment of the victims of the war and its aftermath) promoted by the Spanish Government.

Responding to the criticism, the Vatican has described the October 2007 beatifications as relating to personal virtues and holiness, not ideology. They are not about "resentment but ... reconciliation". The Spanish government has supported the beatifications, sending Foreign Minister Miguel Ángel Moratinos to attend the ceremony. Among those present was Juan Andrés Torres Mora, a relative of one of the martyrs and the Spanish MP who had debated the memory law for PSOE.

The October 2007 beatifications brought the number of martyred persons beatified by the Church to 977, eleven of whom have been canonized as saints. Because of the extent of the persecution, many more cases could be proposed; as many as 10,000 according to Catholic Church sources. The process for beatification has already been initiated for about 2,000 people.

At 28 October 2007 beatifications, Pope Benedict underscored the call to sanctity for all Christians, saying it was "realistic possibility for the entire Christian people". He also noted, "This martyrdom in ordinary life is an important witness in today's secularized society."

=== Pope Francis ===
Pope Francis beatified 522 martyrs on 13 October 2013, at Tarragona, Spain; among them was Eugenio Sanz-Orozco Mortera from Manila, Philippines, who became the first Filipino martyr of the Spanish Civil War. He also approved additional beatifications for Spanish martyrs that took place for a priest on 1 November 2014 as well as two sets of group martyrs on both 5 September 2015 and 3 October 2015. The pope also approved the beatification of 26 Capuchin martyrs, which took place on 21 November 2015. The beatification for Valentín Palencia Marquina and his four companions took place on 23 April 2016 in Burgos.

The 114 Almerian martyrs were beatified on 25 March 2017, and Antonio Arribas Hortigüela and his six companions were beatified on 6 May 2017 in Girona. The beatification of Mateo Casals Mas & 108 companions were beatified in Barcelona on 21 October 2017 and Vicenç Queralt Lloret & 20 companions as well as José Maria Fernández Sánchez & 38 companions were beatified in Madrid on 11 November 2017. The beatification of Teodoro Illera del Olmo & 15 Companions was held on 10 November 2018. The beatification of Ángel Cuartas Cristobal and his 8 companions was held in Oviedo on 9 March 2019 while María Isabel Lacaba Andia and her 13 companions were beatified in Madrid on 22 June 2019. María Pilar Gullón Yturriaga and 2 companions was beatified in Astorga on 29 May 2021. The beatification of Juan Elías Medina and 126 companions will be held in Córdoba on 16 October 2021, Francisco Cástor Sojo López and 3 companions in Tortosa on 30 October 2021 Benet Domènech Bonet & 2 companions in Barcelona on 6 November 2021 The beatifications of Cayetano Giménez Martín & 15 Companions in Granada on 26 February 2022, Angel Marina Álvarez & 19 Companions, Isabel Sánchez Romero, Juan Aguilar Donis & 5 Companions in Almería on 18 June 2022 and Vicente Nicasio Renuncio Toribio & 11 Companions in Madrid on 22 October 2022, Manuel González-Serna Rodríguez & 19 Companions in Sevilla on 18 November 2023, and Gaetano Clausellas Ballvé and Antonio Tort Reixachs in Barcelona on 23 November 2024.

=== Pope Leo XIV ===
On 13 December 2025, Pope Leo XIV beatified Manuel Izquerido Izquerido and 123 Companions in Jaén.

On 27 April 2026, Pope Leo XIV recognised the martyrdom of Servants of God Stanislao Ortega García (born Lorenzo) and 48 companions, members of the Institute of the Brothers of Christian Instruction of Saint Gabriel, together with diocesan priest Emanuel Berenguer Clusella. They were killed between July and November 1936 in various locations in Catalonia.

== Controversy ==
One of the most notable cases has centered on Cruz Laplana y Laguna, Bishop of Cuenca, a well-known supporter of the monarchist regime. After the proclamation of the Second Republic he carried out a number of right-wing political campaigns throughout the province, and had established close contacts with military officials such as General Joaquín Fanjul, a supporter of the Nationalist rebellion. Laplana y Laguna was described by his biographer as "supreme advisor" to the general, as well as being closely involved with the Falange. In 1936 he personally endorsed Falangista leader José Antonio Primo de Rivera as a candidate in the 1936 local elections. When the Nationalist uprising in Cuenca failed, Laplana y Lagun was arrested by Republican militiamen for treason. He was tried for conspiring against the Republican government and executed on 8 August.

Another is Fulgencio Martínez, a priest in the village of La Paca in Murcia, who was shot after the uprising, who was reported by many locals to be closely allied to the local landowners. Over several days before the uprising, Father Fulgencio met with these landowners in the village casino—the hub of social life for the local elites in rural Spain—to organize support for the rebellion. He offered guns and money to anyone who would join an improvised militia. On 18 July, the day of the uprising, Father Fulgencio was among the persons who went through the village streets on lorries, rallying support for the uprising with shouts of "Viva el Ejército!" ("Long live the Army") and "Viva General Queipo de Llano!"

Public statements by some of these clerics have also been widely publicised as a form of criticism against their beatification. Rigoberto Domenech, Archbishop of Zaragoza, declared publicly on 11 August 1936 that the military uprising was to be supported, and its defensive actions approved, because "it is not done in the service of anarchy, but in the benefit of order, fatherland, and religion" in response to the Red Terror. Another statement was that given in November 1938 by Leopoldo Eijo Garay, Bishop of Madrid-Alcalá, regarding a possible truce between Republican and rebel forces: "To tolerate democratic liberalism... would be to betray the martyrs".

Of the second, the controversy surrounding the beatification of Augustinian Friar Gabino Olaso Zabala, listed as a companion of Avelino Rodriguez Alonso, concerns his previous life. Friar Zabala was martyred during the Civil War and was beatified. Attention was called to the fact that Fr. Olaso had been a missionary in the Philippines during the Katipunan rebellion against Spanish rule, and had been accused of torturing Friar Mariano Dacanay, an alleged rebel sympathizer. However this objection ignores the Church proclamation that even sinners can repent and turn into saints, such as in the case of Augustine of Hippo. It also misunderstands the nature of a cause for martyrdom, where the primary factor is the person's death due to religious hatred of the faith, rather than the saintliness of his previous life.

The third objection refers to the Church's attitude to victims of Nationalist repression. Regarding the attitude of the Vatican, Manuel Montero, historian and lecturer of the University of the Basque Country commented on 6 May 2007:

The Church, which upheld the idea of a 'National Crusade' in order to legitimize the military rebellion, was a belligerent part during the Civil War, even at the cost of alienating part of its members. It continues in a belligerent role in its unusual answer to the Historical Memory Law by recurring to the beatification of 498 "martyrs" of the Civil War. The priests executed by Franco's Army are not counted among them... Its selective criteria regarding the religious persons that were part of its ranks are difficult to fathom. The priests who were victims of the republicans are "martyrs who died forgiving", but those priests who were executed by the Francoists are forgotten.

While much of Republican Spain was anti-clerical in sentiment, the Basque region, which also supported the Republic, was not; the clergy of the region stood against the Nationalist coup, and suffered accordingly. At least 16 Basque nationalist priests (among them the arch-priest of Mondragón) were killed by the Nationalists, and hundreds more were imprisoned or deported. This included several priests who tried to halt the killings. The Basque clergy wrote a letter signed by many of their priests to Pope Pius XI assuring him that the Basque government was not engaging in anti-clerical violence or restricting them in any way, like the rest of the Republican parts of Spain. They also confirmed the Basque government's reports of churches being destroyed and members of the clergy being killed during Franco's bombing of Durango and Guernica.

== Individual cases ==
=== Martyrs of Turon ===
The martyrs of Turon were a group of eight De La Salle Brothers, and the Passionist priest who was with them, who were executed by striking miners at Turon in October 1934. This was nearly two years before the outbreak of the civil war, therefore they are not technically martyrs of the Spanish Civil War per se. They were beatified by Pope John Paul II on 29 April 1990, and were canonized by him on 21 November 1999.

=== Innocencio of Mary Immaculate ===
Saint Innocencio of Mary Immaculate, born Emanuele Canoura Arnau, was a member of the Passionist Congregation and martyr of the Spanish Civil War. Born on 10 March 1887 in Santa Cecelia del Valle de Oro in Galicia, Spain, he died at Turon, with his eight companions, on 9 October 1934. He was beatified on 29 April 1990 and was canonized by Pope John Paul II on 21 November 1999.

=== Jaime Hilario Barbal ===
Jaime Hilario Barbal, born Manuel Barbal Cosán, was raised in a pious and hardworking family near the Pyrenees mountains. Entered the seminary at age 12, but when his hearing began to fail in his teens, he was sent home. Joined the Brothers of the Christian Schools at age 19, entering the novitiate on 24 February 1917 at Irun, Spain, taking the name Jaime Hilario. Exceptional teacher and catechist, he believed strongly in the value of universal education, especially for the poor. However, his hearing problems grew worse, and in the early 1930s, he was forced to retire from teaching, and began work in the garden at the La Salle house at San Jose, Tarragona, Spain. Imprisoned in July 1936 at Mollerosa, Spain when the Spanish Civil War broke out and religious people were swept from the street. Transferred to Tarragona in December, then confined on a prison ship with some other religious people. Convicted on 15 January 1937 of being a Christian Brother. Two rounds of volley fire from a firing squad did not kill him, possibly because some of the soldiers intentionally shot wide; their commander then murdered Jaime with five shots at close range. First of the 97 La Salle Brothers killed in Catalonia, Spain during the Spanish Civil War to be recognized as a martyr. He was beatified on 29 April 1990, and was canonized by Pope John Paul II on 21 November 1999.

=== Pedro Poveda Castroverde ===
He was a priest, the founder of the Teresian Association and a Martyr of the Spanish civil war. He was beatified on 10 October 1993 and canonized on 4 May 2003.

=== Passionist Martyrs of Daimiel ===
They were a group of priests and brothers of the Passionist Congregation killed by Republican forces during the Spanish Civil War. They were beatified by Pope John Paul II on 1 October 1989. Eyewitnesses reported that all of the Passionists had forgiven their murderers before they died. A witness to the murder of Father Niceforo reported that after being shot the priest turned his eyes to heaven then turned and smiled at his murderers. At this point one of them, now more infuriated than ever, shouted:

What, are you still smiling?

With that he shot him at point blank range.

=== Eugenio Sanz-Orozco Mortera ===
Eugenio Sanz-Orozco Mortera (Jose Maria of Manila) was born on 5 September 1880 in Manila, Philippines. He was a Franciscan Capuchin priest. He died a martyr on 17 August 1936, in Madrid, Spain, during the Spanish civil war. He is venerated in the Catholic Church, which celebrates his feast on 6 November. He was beatified on 13 October 2013.

=== Bartolomé Blanco Márquez ===
Bartolomé Blanco Márquez was born in Cordoba, Spain in 1914. He was arrested as a Catholic leader—he was the secretary of Catholic Action and a delegate to the Catholic Syndicates—on 18 August 1936. He was executed on 2 October 1936, at age 21, while he cried out, "Long live Christ the King!" Born in Pozoblanco 25 November 1914, Bartolome was orphaned as a child, and raised by family with whom he worked. He was an excellent student, studying under the tutelage of the Salesians.

=== Victoria Díez Bustos de Molina ===
She was a religious, the member of the same congregation and also a Martyr of the Spanish civil war. She was beatified on 10 October 1993.

=== Pedro Asúa Mendía ===
Pedro was educated by Jesuits. Trained as an architect, graduating in 1915. he worked on schools, churches and houses for religious. He was ordained priest in the diocese of Vitoria, Spain in 1924. He was executed on 29 August 1936. He was beatified on 1 November 2014.

=== Mariano Mullerat i Soldevila ===
Mariano was a Spanish Roman Catholic doctor who also served as the mayor for Arbeca from 1924 until March 1930. He died on 13 August 1936. He was beatified on 23 March 2019.

=== Joan Roig i Diggle ===
Joan was a young layperson of the Archdiocese of Barcelona. He died on 11 September 1936. He was beatified on 7 November 2020.

=== Isabel Sánchez Romero ===
Isabel was a religious from the Dominican Order. She died on 15 February 1937. She was beatified on 18 June 2022.

== List of martyrs ==
=== Beatification ===
Date	Martyrs	Feast Day
29 March 1987	María Pilar Martínez García and 2 companions	24 July
1 October 1989	Niceforo Díez Tejerina and 25 companions	23 July
29 April 1990	Cirilo Bertrán Sanz Tejedor, Inocencio Canoura Arnau and 7 companions*	9 October
29 April 1990	Maria Merce Prat i Prat	24 July
29 April 1990	Jaime Hilario Barbal Cosán*	18 January
25 October 1992	Braulio María Corres Díaz de Cerio, Federico Rubio Alvarez and 69 companions	30 July
25 October 1992	Felipe de Jesús Munárriz and 50 companions	13 August
10 October 1993	Diego Ventaja Milán, Manuel Medina Olmos and 7 companions	30 August
10 October 1993	Pedro Poveda Castroverde*	28 July
10 October 1993	Victoria Díez Bustos de Molina	12 August
1 October 1995	Anselmo Polanco Fontecha & Felipe Ripoll Morata	7 February
1 October 1995	Martin Martinez Pascual	18 August
1 October 1995	Pedro Ruiz de los Paños Ángel and 8 companions	23 July
1 October 1995	Dionisio Pamplona and 12 companions	22 September
1 October 1995	Carlos Eraña Guruceta and 2 companions	18 September
1 October 1995	Ángeles Lloret Martí and 16 companions	20 November
1 October 1995	Vicente Vilar David	14 February
4 May 1997	Florentino Asensio Barroso	9 August
4 May 1997	Ceferino Giménez Malla	4 May
10 May 1998	Rita Josefa Pujalte Sánchez & Francisca Aldea Araujo	20 July
10 May 1998	María Gabriela Hinojosa Naveros and 6 companions	18 November
10 May 1998	María Sagrario Moragas Cantarero	16 August
7 March 1999	Vicente Soler Munárriz and 7 companions	5 May
11 March 2001	José Aparicio Sanz & 232 companions	22 September
29 October 2005	Josep Tàpies Sirvant and 6 companions	13 August
29 October 2005	Ángela Ginard Martí	26 August
28 October 2007	498 Martyrs of the Spanish Civil War	6 November
23 January 2010	Josep Samsó Elias	1 September
17 December 2011	Francisco Esteban Lacal and 22 companions	28 November
13 October 2013	522 Martyrs of the Spanish Civil War	6 November
1 November 2014	Pedro Asúa Mendía	29 August
5 September 2015	Fidela Oller Angelats and 2 companions	30 August
3 October 2015	Pio Heredia Zubia and 17 companions	4 December
21 November 2015	Frederic Tarrés Puigpelat and 25 companions	6 November
23 April 2016	Valentín Palencia Marquina and 4 companions	15 January
8 October 2016	Genaro Fueyo Castañón and 3 companions	21 October
29 October 2016	José Antón Gómez and 3 companions	25 September
25 March 2017	José Álvarez-Benavides de la Torre and 114 companions	6 November
6 May 2017	Antonio Arribas Hortigüela & 6 companions	6 November
21 October 2017	Mateu Casals Mas, Teófilo Casajús Alduán, Ferran Saperas Aluja and 106 companions	1 February
11 November 2017	Vicenç Queralt Lloret, José María Fernández Sánchez and 58 Companions	6 November
10 November 2018	Teodoro Illera del Olmo and 15 companions	6 November
9 March 2019	Ángel Cuartas Cristobal and 8 companions	6 November
23 March 2019	Mariano Mullerat i Soldevila	13 August
22 June 2019	María Isabel Lacaba Andia and 13 companions	6 November
7 November 2020	Joan Roig i Diggle	11 September
29 May 2021	María Pilar Gullón Yturriaga and 2 companions	6 November
16 October 2021	Juan Elías Medina and 126 companions	6 November
30 October 2021	Francisco Cástor Sojo López and 3 companions	25 October
6 November 2021	Benet Domènech Bonet and 2 companions	6 November
26 February 2022	Cayetano Giménez Martín & 15 companions	6 November
18 June 2022	Ángel Marina Álvarez and 19 Companions	6 November
18 June 2022	Juan Aguilar Donis & 5 Companions	6 November
18 June 2022	Isabel Sánchez Romero	17 February
22 October 2022	Vicente Nicasio Renuncio Toribio & 11 Companions	6 November
18 November 2023	Manuel González-Serna Rodríguez & 19 Companions	6 November
23 November 2024	Gaetano Clausellas Ballvé	6 November
23 November 2024	Antonio Tort Reixachs	6 November
13 December 2025	Manuel Izquerido Izquerido and 123 Companions	6 November
17 October 2026	Joan Torres Torres and 19 Companions	6 November
7 November 2026	Francisco González de Córdova and 79 Companions	6 November
28 November 2026	Ignacio Aláez Vaquero and 10 Companions	6 November

(*) means they are Canonized.

=== Canonization ===
Date	Martyrs
21 November 1999	Cirilo Bertrán Sanz Tejedor and 7 Companions
21 November 1999	Innocencio of Mary Immaculate
21 November 1999	Jaime Hilario Barbal Cosán
4 May 2003	Pedro Poveda Castroverde

== See also ==
- Martyrs of China
- Korean Martyrs
- China Martyrs of 1900
- Martyr Saints of China
- Blessed Bartolome Blanco Marquez, cooperator of the Salesian Fathers
- Suppression of Freemasonry (Spain)
- Martyrs of the Cristero War
- Drina Martyrs
- 233 Spanish Martyrs
- 498 Spanish Martyrs
- International Day of Prayer for the Persecuted Church
