= Bordino =

Bordino is a surname. Notable people with the surname include:

- Luigi Bordino (1922–1977), Italian Roman Catholic priest
- Pietro Bordino (1887–1928), Italian racecar driver
- Virginio Bordino (1804–1879), Italian soldier and inventor
- Don Gregorio Bonici dei Marchesi Bordino

== See also ==
- Bordini
