= Bordin =

Bordin is a surname. Notable people with the surname include:

- Alessandro Bordin (born 1998), Italian footballer
- Gelindo Bordin (born 1959), Italian former athlete
- Mike Bordin (born 1962), American drummer
- Roberto Bordin, Italian former footballer
- Thiago Bordin, Brazilian ballet dancer

== See also ==
- Bordini
