= Gargani =

Gargani is a surname. Notable people with the surname include:

- Aldo Gargani (1933–2009), Italian philosopher
- Giuseppe Gargani (1935–2026), Italian politician and lawyer
- Maria Gargani (1892-1973), Italian member of the Secular Franciscan Order
