= Cestac =

Cestac is a French surname. Notable people with the surname include:

- Abel Cestac (1918–1995), Argentine boxer
- Florence Cestac (born 1949), French cartoonist
- Louis-Édouard Cestac (1801–1868), French priest
