= Bordini =

Bordini is an Italian surname. Notable people with the surname include:

- Alessandro Bordini (born 1985), Italian blind man
- Carlo Bordini (1938–2020), Italian poet

== See also ==
- Bordin
