= Mariantonia Samà =

Italian Roman Catholic

Blessed Mariantonia Samà
- Born: 2 March 1875; Sant'Andrea Ionio, Catanzaro, Kingdom of Italy
- Died: 27 May 1953 (aged 78); Sant'Andrea Ionio, Catanzaro, Italy
- Resting place: Santi Pietro e Paolo
- Venerated in: Roman Catholic Church
- Beatified: 3 October 2021, Basilica di Maria Santissima Immacolata, Catanzaro, Italy by Cardinal Marcello Semeraro
- Feast: 27 May

Mariantonia Samà (2 March 1875 - 27 May 1953) was an Italian Roman Catholic. Samà lived alone with her mother until 1920 aiding her in domestic duties while coping with their poor state due to her father's death before Samà was born. But drinking unsafe water after working in the fields caused great infirmities and often-violent convulsions that the populace believed her to be possessed. In the town lived a baroness who organized for her to be taken to a Carthusian convent to be exorcised but this failed. Samà was healed after the convent's prior put her in front of a statue of Bruno of Cologne and lived in relative peace for a while before being bedridden with another illness that she never recovered from.

Her mother tended to her until her death in 1920 at which point the populace as well as nuns and Redemptorist priests came to visit her to aid her and provide for her while also seeking her out for advice. Samà was close to the Sisters of the Sacred Heart who placed a black veil upon her head as if she were a nun too.

The beatification process had been called for since her death since the population came to believe she was a saint due to her reputation for personal holiness. The calls for such a process grew in the 2000s to the point where the formal cause was launched in her province. The process culminated on 18 December 2017 after Pope Francis confirmed her heroic virtue and named her as Venerable as a result. He also approved a decree confirming a miracle attributed to her in mid-2020; her beatification was celebrated in Catanzaro on 3 October 2021.

== Life ==
=== Childhood ===
Mariantonia Samà was born on 2 March 1875 as the sole child born to Bruno Samà (d. 20.06.1874) and Marianna Vivino (d. 24.02.1920). Her father had died a few months prior to her birth which left her mother alone to take care of the newborn child. The pair were poor and lived in a small home in a small lane almost five feet wide with dim light. Her baptism was celebrated on 3 March in the local parish. Her paternal grandmother was Antonia Frustaci and her maternal great-uncle was Antonio Vivino (09.10.1824-???). Her maternal grandparents were Giuseppe Vivino and Caterina Carioti. Samà made her First Communion and received her Confirmation in 1882.

The pair fostered a close bond with each other due to the pair living alone and her mother did all she could to provide for herself and her daughter despite their hardships. Samà was docile and obedient to her mother. The two were also illiterate and spoke the local dialect rather than the mainstream Italian language. The pair were also pious and walked barefoot in summer and winter to attend Mass at their church; their clothing was also poor and was minimal more so in wintertime. Samà often accompanied a mule loaded with wheat to the mill and would bring it back to the village with sacks of flour which would be exchanged for a loaf of bread each week.

=== Hardship ===
In 1886 she followed her mother and some relatives to the Saluro River to clean clothing near the mill along the banks. En route home she was in a section of land known as Briga and there decided to quench her thirst so bent to drink from a water puddle she thought was clean (but in all likelihood was contaminated). But when she reached home she shrunk up and was immobile for about a month. During this period she often babbled incoherent things and often shook and twisted around. It was also strange in the mind of those who knew her condition that she ate past midnight and at no other time. But soon people came to believe that evil spirits had possessed her and so turned to God for a miracle. These attempts failed until the baroness Enrichetta Scoppa decided to intervene in 1894. The baroness organized for the immobile Samà to be taken to a Carthusian convent (that of Serra San Bruno) for an exorcism. The convent's archives revealed a monk's 15 paged narrative dated 1904 and detailing the baroness's plans. In June 1894 she was transported eight hours alongside her mother to the carrier but sealed in a wooden box with four people as her carriers. Samà was enclosed in the wooden box due to her often-violent convulsions. Her transporters were Antonio Mannello and Antonio Frustaci as well as the brothers Vincenzo and Giuseppe Lombardo (who all worked for the baroness). During the trip the box was opened to see if she required something but she declined and grew more and more agitated over time.

Their arrival at the convent was before noon with some of the locals following the procession to the convent where the exorcism rite began in Latin once the procession reached the convent's main gate. The absent convent's prior - who had been elsewhere - joined the crowd and the other monks for five hours turning to God for His grace but nothing happened. To that end the prior ordered a servant to get a silver bust containing the cranium and bones of Saint Bruno of Cologne. Once Samà saw this bust - which she believed was smiling at her - got up and hugged the bust proclaiming her condition to be healed. The crowd were elated that Samà's condition was resolved so the box and her old clothes were burned to the side of the convent to demonstrate a rebirth and renewal.

=== The Little Sister of Saint Bruno ===
Samà returned home but in 1896 suffered from arthritis. The condition grew so bad to the point where she confined herself to her bed on her back with her bent knees raised. This would be the position she would remain in for the remainder of her life. Samà was immobile once more but could use her hands to recite rosaries and to eat. Her mother died in 1920 which left her alone until an older woman oversaw her care for a time. But the townsfolk visited her to help care for her. People bought her food and cooked meals as well as oils and fruits to sustain her without causing her pain and intestinal complications. But she was far too modest for the doctor to assess those areas that caused her greater pain and forbade the doctor from doing so. Those supplies she needed she kept for herself but donated the rest of the food supplies to the poor and said of it that "God will take care of me tomorrow!" There were those who offered financial assistance but she refused all attempts at this.

The wall opposite her had a large Crucifix and she would often stare at it and refer to Jesus as "that beautiful Jesus" as the best description possible for Him. The local priest would bring the Eucharist to her each morning as well as each noon and night at her request for she believed it bought her closer to Jesus. People who visited her often recited rosaries with her in Latin and countless others came to see her to ask her for advice. Her response would be to urge courage and hope.

The Sisters of the Sacred Heart - whom the baroness Scoppa had allowed to settle in her vacant palace - made her a "sister" and had a special reverence and love for her. To that end the order covered her head with the order's black veil and she became known as the "Little Sister of Saint Bruno". The nuns too took care of her and helped to both comb and bathe her. The local parish priest and the Redemptorist fathers also visited her and oversaw her spiritual care and guidance. In 1915 she dedicated herself to God through private vows with the permission of the parish priest.

=== Death and burial ===
Samà died in the morning on 27 May 1953 while three women were at her bedside reciting litanies to the Blessed Mother; her gaze upon her death was at the Crucifix on the opposite wall and her last words were the names of Jesus and His mother. Upon her death she had no visible bedsores and her skin was both smooth and unblemished. Her remains were dressed in a white linen dress and carried in a procession through the streets in an open casket before their interment following her funeral on 29 May. Upon her death the parish priest wrote in the margins of her death certificate that Samà had "died in the concept of holiness". On 3 August 2003 her remains were relocated from the chapel of the Sisters of the Sacred Heart to a new special tomb constructed in the church of Santi Pietro e Paolo.

== Beatification ==
The Calabrian episcopate voiced their approval in launching the cause for the canonization for Samà after a favorable vote was taken on 20 April 2007. The diocesan investigation opened in the Catanzaro-Squillace archdiocese on 5 August 2007 and later concluded on 2 March 2009. But the formal introduction to the cause came under Pope Benedict XVI on 29 September 2007 after she was titled as a Servant of God and the Congregation for the Causes of Saints issued an edict declaring "nihil obstat" (no objections to the cause). But the C.C.S. requested that another investigation into Samà's life be undertaken and the process was opened on 20 October 2011 and was closed a couple of months later on 31 January 2012. The C.C.S. later validated these two processes in Rome on 9 June 2012.

The postulation drafted and later submitted the Positio dossier to the C.C.S. officials on 15 September 2014 for evaluation with nine theologians approving the cause on 21 June 2016 after having assessed the dossier. The cardinal and bishop members of the C.C.S. approved the cause later on 5 December 2017. Samà became titled as Venerable on 18 December 2017 after Pope Francis confirmed that she had lived a model life of heroic virtue.

Her beatification depends upon one miracle receiving papal approval; the miracle needs to be a healing that both science and medicine fail to explain. There was one such case reported in Genoa which led to Cardinal Angelo Bagnasco overseeing a diocesan investigation into the case from 1 November 2008 until 23 October 2009. Medical experts approved this miracle in December 2019 as did theologians in the months following in addition to the C.C.S. members. Pope Francis signed a decree on 10 July 2020 confirming this healing as a miracle therefore enabling for Samà to be beatified in Catanzaro on 3 October 2021. The current postulator for the cause is the Capuchin friar Carlo Calloni.
