= Alessandro Bordini =

Italian traveler

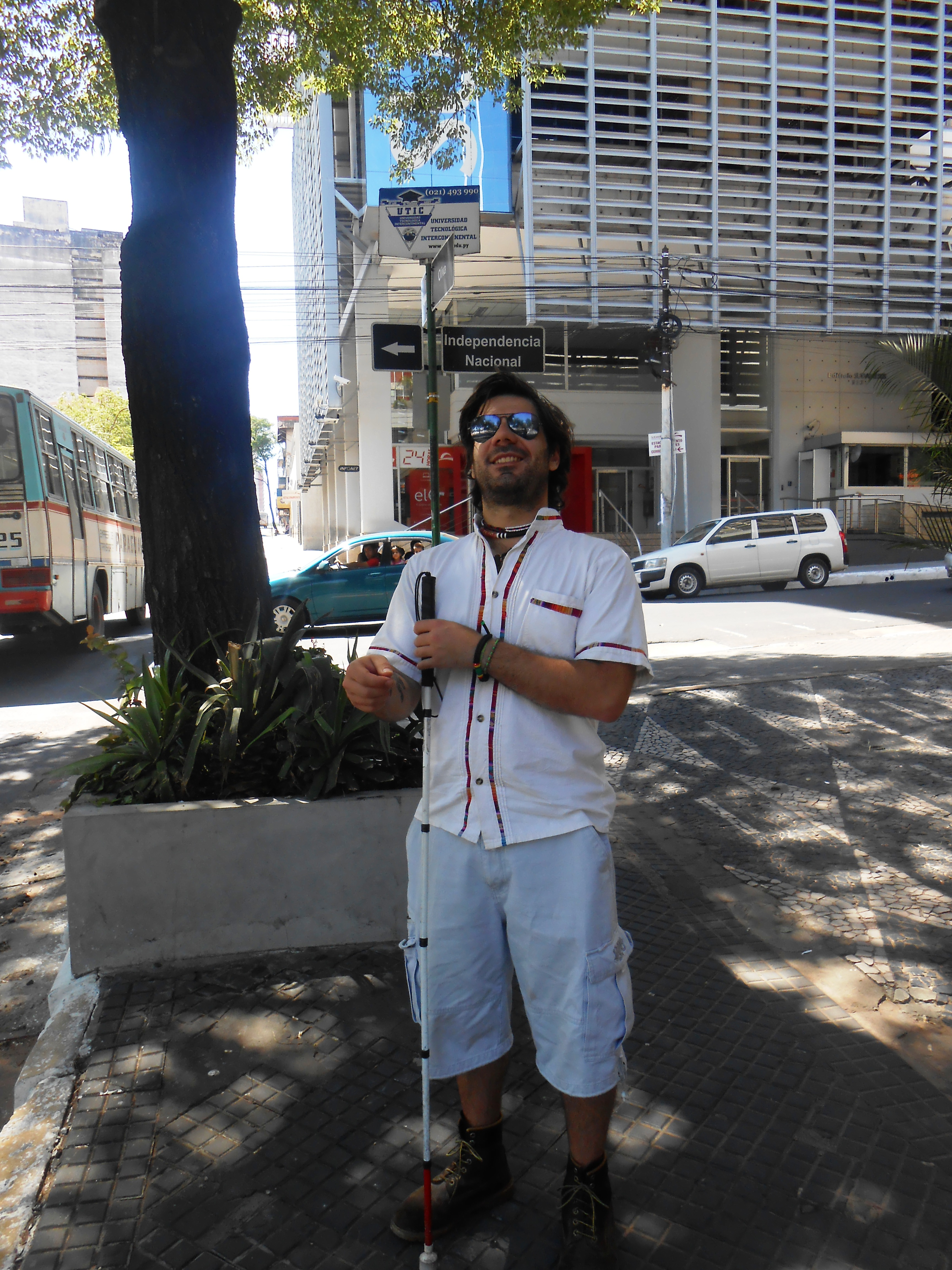
Alessandro Bordini in Paraguay

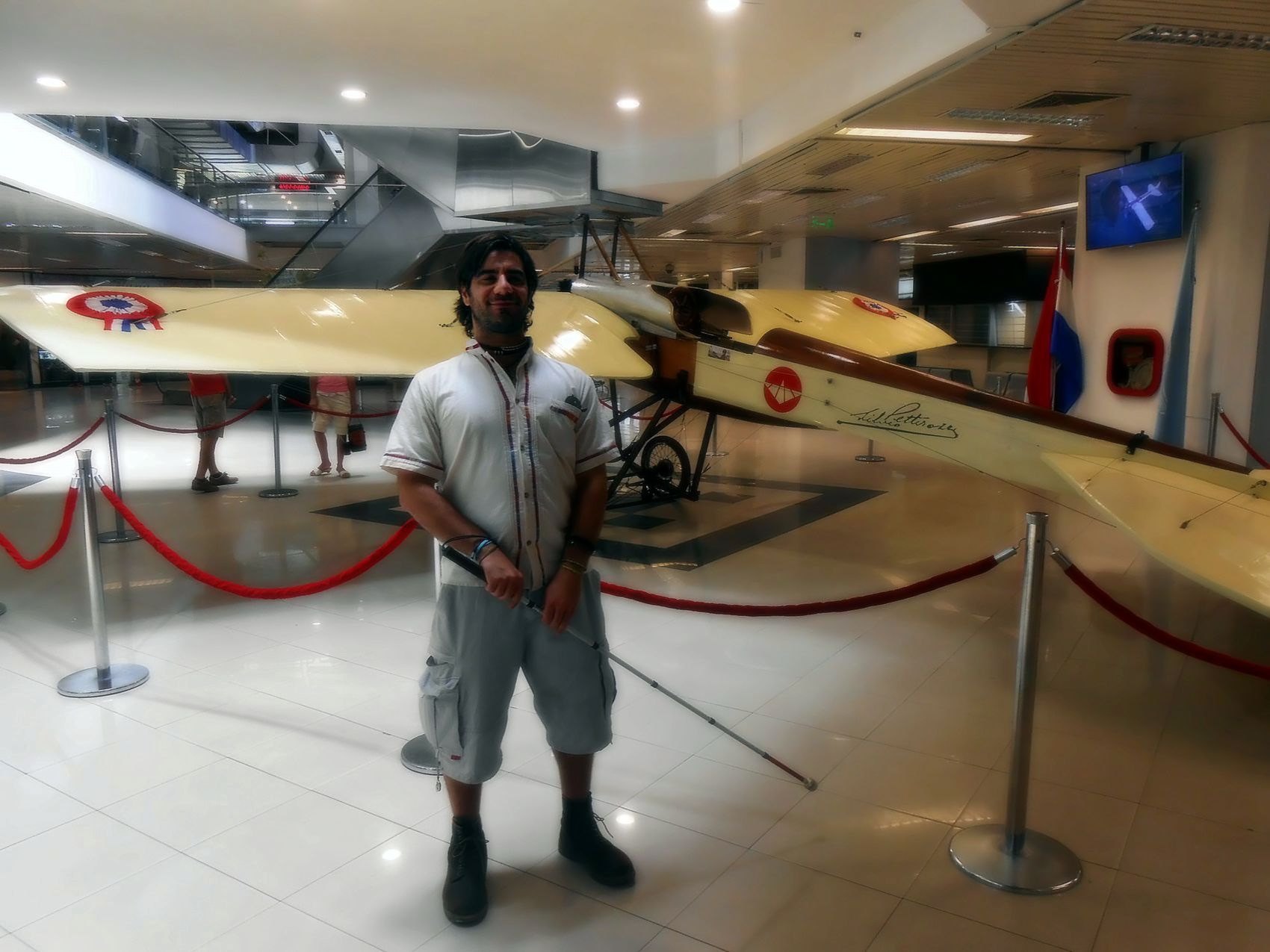
Alessandro Bordini in the Silvio Pettirossi International Airport

Alessandro Bordini (born 8 August 1985) is an Italian blind man who travels the world alone with his stick and iPhone.

== Biography ==
Bordini was born in the Province of Verona. His father was a wood craftsman. He attended the Italian public schools. After completing his schooling, Bordini worked with his father. At age 21 he took up skydiving.

== Accident and resolution ==
After skydiving regularly for three years Bordini was seriously injured in a landing accident. He lost his sight as a result of his injuries and it took several months of treatment and hospitalization before he was able to resume his life.

Bordini attended a seminar given by French motivation speaker Michelle J. Noel, in which the marvelous adaptive and recuperative powers of the human brain were discussed. This motivated Bordini to adapt a more positive outlook on his life. Three years after his accident, he embarked on an around-the-world journey of discovery.

In 2019 he wrote the book “Crescere al buio” (it:Giacomo Bruno Publishing) that become Amazon Bestseller in 1 hours
