= Marie-Eugène de l'Enfant-Jésus =

French Discalced Carmelite priest

Blessed Marie-Eugene de L'Enfant-Jésus OCD
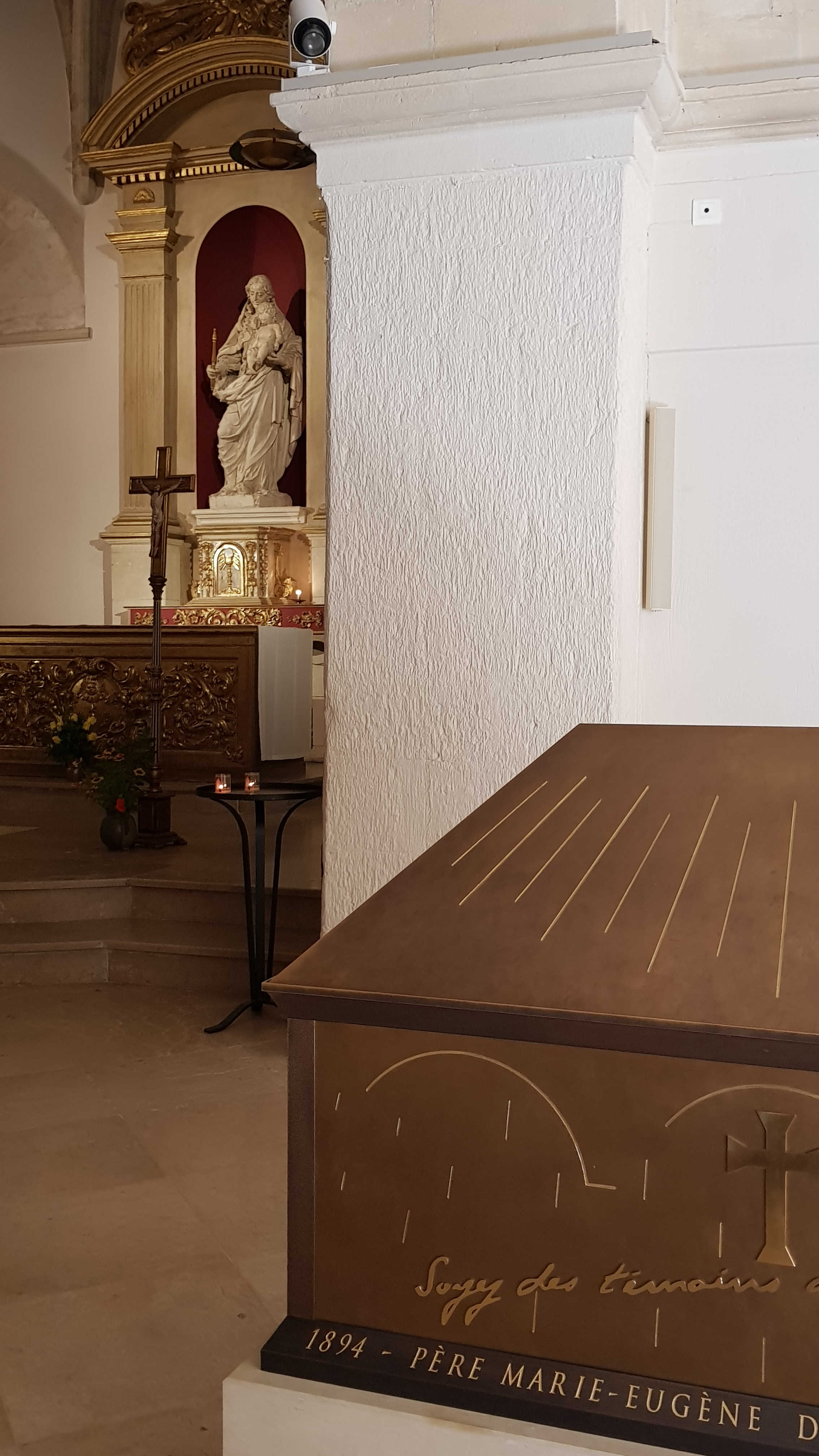
- Tomb of Blessed Marie-Eugène de l'Enfant-Jésus OCD in Notre-Dame de Vie
- Born: 2 December 1894; Le Gua, Aveyron, French Third Republic
- Died: 27 March 1967 (aged 72); Venasque, Vaucluse, France
- Venerated in: Roman Catholic Church
- Beatified: 19 November 2016, Avignon, France by Cardinal Angelo Amato
- Feast: 4 February

Marie-Eugene de L'Enfant-Jésus, OCD (born Henri Grialou; 2 December 1894 – 27 March 1967) was a French Catholic priest and a Discalced Carmelite. He joined the Carmelites just after his ordination.

Grialou held several positions of leadership within his congregation and was an extensive traveler as a manager of a range of different Carmelite convents and monasteries across the world. He was the founder of the Secular Institute of Notre-Dame de Vie. Grialou was also a noted spiritual writer and wrote at great length on the Carmelite charism as well as on a range of Carmelite luminaries.

Grialou's life was driven with his devotion to the Carmelite charism and to the spreading and promotion of evangelical zeal. His motto in life was "traditus gratiae Dei" (surrendered to the grace of God). He ensured that Carmelite teachings and its charism was promoted among the faithful.

He was proclaimed to be Venerable on 19 December 2011 after Pope Benedict XVI signed a decree that acknowledged the fact that Grialou lived a life of heroic virtue. One miracle required for beatification received the approval of Pope Francis on 3 March 2016; his beatification was celebrated on 19 November 2016 in Avignon and Cardinal Angelo Amato presided over the celebration on the pope's behalf.

== Life ==
Henri Grialou was born on 2 December 1894 in Le Gua as one of five children to Auguste Grialou (1860-1904) and Marie Miral; his father died of pneumonia just before Grialou turned ten. He had four siblings: there was Marius as the first and then Fernande with Angèle and Berthe (d. 2 January 1958) following.

In his childhood his sole desire was to become a priest but became more concrete towards the end of his childhood. From September 1905 until September 1907 he received a free education from the Fathers of the Holy Spirit in Suzio and in Langogne. His mother worked hard to send him for his studies in October 1908 into the minor seminary in Graves; his father died of tuberculosis in August 1904. Grialou entered the major seminary in Rodez in October 1911 where he discovered the life and works of Thérèse of Lisieux - then just starting along the road to sanctification. During his studies he said of her: "I find her life written by herself admirable. I've read it several times and bought myself a copy so I can often read it". His formation and studies were interrupted with the outbreak of World War I and Grialou served on the front lines as an officer. At the war's end and his discharge in 1919 he had the rank of Lieutenant and was decorated as a chevalier in the Legion of Honor with the military cross. For both he and his men he felt the powerful protection of Thérèse of Lisieux and took solace in the fact that he had a powerful intercessor protecting him and his fellow comrades. In the 1920s - before she was canonized - he wrote of her: "It seems to me that the mission of the little Blessed is to spread the divine love in souls in the form which God wills for our times". In 1920 he discovered the writings of John of the Cross and was moved and inspired to look past his vocation to something much more and as a result felt a greater call: to the monastic life and to the Carmelites. But this secured his mother's resistance in 1921 but she later relented to her son's determination.

Grialou was ordained to the priesthood on 4 February 1922 and assumed the new religious name of "Marie-Eugène de L'Enfant-Jésus" upon entering the order. At his ordination he said: "I am a priest, a priest for eternity ... tomorrow I shall hold You in my hands and I will be giving You, Jesus. You will be mine and You want to associate me to Your sacrifice ..." He began his novitiate in the Discalced Carmelites after he entered on 24 February 1922 in Avon close to Fontainebleau and his new name demonstrated his deep inspiration for the Little Flower; once he entered he said of it: "My vocation is certain. Grialou was received into the order with his new name and received the Carmelite habit on 10 March 1922.

As a priest he made it his task to make known the teaching of the Carmelite saints and he believed that the paths to both contemplation and personal holiness were open to all the Christian faithful. His two major works - "I Want to See God" and "I am a Daughter of the Church" - both offer rich insight into the Carmelite charism and are also comprehensive studies of the great Carmelite luminaries. This included both the Little Flower and John of the Cross but also Teresa of Ávila.

On the Feast of Pentecost in 1929 three women came to him and were directresses of a female college in Marseille - among them was Marie Pila. He established his own religious congregation - the Secular Institute of Notre-Dame de Vie - alongside Pila in 1932 in Venasque. In 1936 he was the prior of all convents in Agen and the same but in Monaco from 1936 to 1937. He was an extensive traveller and visited the Philippines in December 1954 when the first branch of his institute opened there; he celebrated his first Mass there of the institute on 25 December 1954 and would later return to the nation in 1964. He sought to revitalize Carmelite monasteries and convents and thus Pope Pius XII in 1948 made him an Apostolic Visitor in order for him to do this. In the order itself he was the Definitor General (1937-1954) and was its Vicar-General (1954-1955); in the latter post he travelled across to a range of different Carmelite monasteries. His sister Berthe joined his order in 1939 - she was in an accident in 1942 and healed - and later died on 2 January 1958. He visited - from 4 May 1960 to 6 June - Canada and went to visit the Carmelite convents at places such as Montreal and Dolbeau. He later returned to Canada from 25 June to 18 July 1963 alongside Marie Pila and visited Mexico with her from 1 July 1961 to 20 August. He later visited the far East alongside Pila from 18 January 1964 to 18 February and made stops in Rome as well as in Saigon and Dalat before spending two weeks in the Philippines. The priest travelled once again to Canada from 25 May 1964 to 6 June and back to Canada once more from 27 June to 18 July 1966.

He died on 27 March 1967 following Easter as his health had deteriorated since 1965. His final words to those gathered at his bedside were: "As for me, I am on my way to perfect union with the Holy Spirit". He had suffered severe pneumonia from 18 February 1965 until 25 February and believed he would die in that period. His order received papal approval from Pope Paul VI on 21 November 1973.

== Legacy ==
The Secular Institute of Notre-Dame de Vie has since his death expanded into Japan and Canada amongst other states such as Poland and Mexico. The congregation has since expanded more so in the respective countries in terms of the number of members and houses preset.

== Beatfication process ==
The process for beatification opened in Avignon on 7 April 1985 and saw the accumulation of all documents and the writings associated with him. His life and his works - and that of his religious congregation - was placed under careful investigation also; 25 000 pages of documentation and of witness testimonies were all part of this process. The process closed on 5 March 1994 in Avignon; this process commenced when it did despite the fact that the official introduction of the cause did not come until September 27, 1985 under Pope John Paul II - this granted him the title Servant of God.

Another process was opened in Japan and lasted less than a week from 3 April 1990 to 5 April 1990. Both processes were declared valid on 24 March 1999 and were both ratified also. This allowed for the Congregation for the Causes of Saints to begin their own investigation into the cause in what would be the so-called "Roman Phase". The Positio was submitted to Rome in 2000 and was put to theologians who approved the contents of the Positio.

On 19 December 2011 he was proclaimed to be Venerable after Pope Benedict XVI acknowledged that Grialou had lived a model Christian life of heroic virtue - both cardinal and theological - which the pope deemed Grialou exercised to a favorable degree.

The miracle required for the beatification was investigated and was sent to the [ongregation for the Causes of Saints in Rome for their own investigation. The medical board that advises them met to discuss the healing on 28 May 2015 and approved it as being a miracle. The board passed it onto theologians who also met and approved the case as being a miracle on 1 December 2015 and the cardinal and bishop members of the Congregation met and approved the healing as a miracle on 1 March 2016. It was passed to the pope for his approval and received it on 3 March 2016.

Previous reports indicated that the beatification could have taken place in 2017. The beatification was celebrated in Avignon on 19 November 2016 with Cardinal Angelo Amato presiding on the behalf of the pontiff.

The current postulator of the cause is the Discalced Carmelite priest Romano Gambalunga.
