= Isabel Sánchez Romero =

Spanish nun

Blessed Isabel Sánchez Romero OP
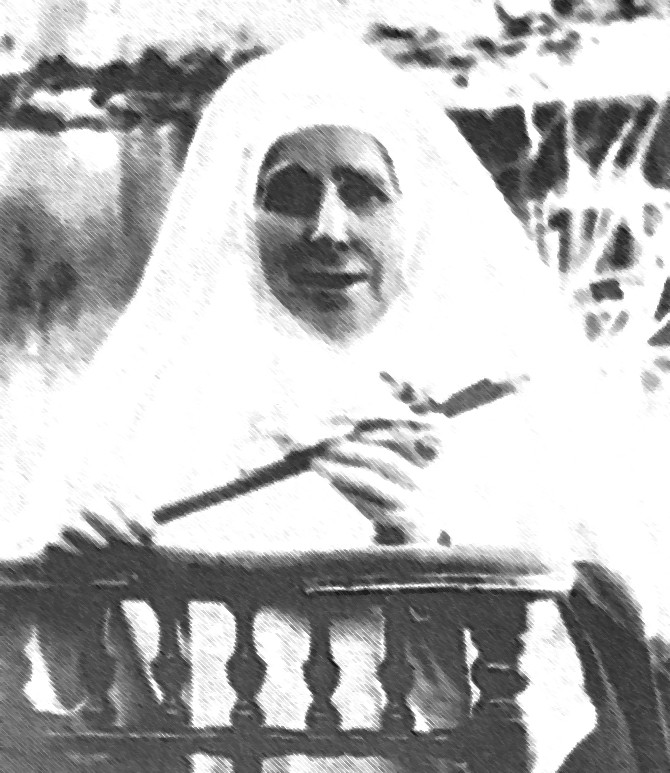

Martyr
- Born: 9 May 1861; Huéscar, Granada, Kingdom of Spain
- Died: 17 February 1937 (aged 75); Huéscar, Granada, Second Spanish Republic
- Venerated in: Roman Catholic Church
- Beatified: 18 June 2022, Cathedral of Santa María de la Sede, Seville, Spain by Cardinal Marcello Semeraro
- Feast: 17 February
- Attributes: Dominican habit, crucifix

Isabel Sánchez Romero, religious name Asunción de San José, (9 May 1861 – 17 February 1937) was a Spanish nun of the Order of Preachers.

Sánchez became a postulant after she turned seventeen and was known amongst her peers for her obedient and silent nature but also developed a reputation as a hard worker who was contemplative in nature. The Spanish Civil War saw her imprisoned and anti-religious forces attempted to force her to renounce her faith and subscribe to their regime. Sánchez refused to do so and was beaten to death since her captors decided not to shoot her like others executed. Her beatification was celebrated in Seville on 18 June 2022.

== Life ==
Isabel Sánchez Romero was born in Huéscar in the Granada province on 9 May 1861 as the last of eight children. Her baptism was celebrated at her local parish church on 13 May and she received her Confirmation that 11 November.

Sánchez became a postulant and joined the Dominican nuns once she turned seventeen at the La Consolación convent in her hometown and assumed the religious name of "Asunción de San José" to honor Saint Joseph; she made her solemn profession of vows on 2 October 1885. In her convent she became noted for her obedient and silent nature and had become known as a hard worker who was quick to help her peers in their duties. From her childhood she suffered from a rare disease that created painful wounds which never complained about despite the pain that she would experience.

The outbreak of civil war in Spain in the mid-1930s saw an intense wave of anti-religious sentiment and was also witness to a period of terror that saw convents dissolved and priests and nuns interrogated and executed. The nuns made the decision to leave their convent and take refuge amongst their friends while she went to live with her relatives in her hometown. The time came when Socialist armed forces apprehended her and imprisoned her on 16 February 1937 after the men broke into the house that evening; she was beaten at times and ordered to renounce her faith and blaspheme since her captors believed that it would amuse them to see a nun at her age do this. But she refused to give in and her captors decided to kill her alongside several others which included her nephew Florencio. The soldiers decided to take them in a van in the morning to a local cemetery and brutally threw the aged nun in the van which she had been unable to get into by herself due to her age. Sánchez, who never stopped praying throughout the ordeal, was the last one killed on 17 February 1937 and her captors decided not to shoot her like the rest and instead beat her to death with a rock. Her last words were recorded as "long live Christ the King!"

== Beatification ==
The beatification process for Sánchez Romero was initiated on 5 July 1995 after the Congregation for the Causes of Saints issued the nihil obstat; this enabled the Guadix diocese to launch a diocesan investigation into her life and holiness on 5 December 1995 and which concluded on 18 March 1997. Pope Francis signed a decree on 11 December 2019 that determined that Sánchez had been killed in odium fidei ("in hatred of the faith"). The beatification was celebrated in Seville on 18 June 2022. The postulator for this cause is the Dominican Gianni Festa.

== See also ==
- Martyrs of the Spanish Civil War
