= Giacomo Abbondo =

Italian Roman Catholic priest

Blessed Giacomo Abbondo
- Church: Roman Catholic Church

Orders
- Ordination: 21 March 1744 by Giovanni Pietro Solaro
- Rank: Priest

Personal details
- Born: Giacomo Abbondo; 27 August 1720 Salomino, Vercelli, Duchy of Milan
- Died: 9 February 1788 (aged 67) Tronzano, Vercelli, Duchy of Milan
- Buried: Tronzano, Italy
- Parents: Carlo Benedetto Abbondo; Francesca Maria Naya

Sainthood
- Feast day: 9 February
- Venerated in: Roman Catholic Church
- Beatified: 11 June 2016; Vercelli, Italy by Cardinal Angelo Amato

Giacomo Abbondo (27 August 1720 – 9 February 1788) was an Italian Roman Catholic priest who hailed from Vercelli. Abbondo served as a pastor and provost in his home town of Tronzano where he administered to the people while proclaiming the message of the Gospel and bringing the sacraments to his parishioners.

Pope Francis proclaimed him to be Venerable in 2014 and approved a miracle needed for his beatification in 2015. The beatification was celebrated in Vercelli on 11 June 2016; Cardinal Angelo Amato led the celebration on behalf of the pope.

== Life ==
=== Early life and education ===
Giacomo Abbondo was born in Vercelli on 27 August 1720 as the second of six children to Carlo Benedetto Abbondo and Francesca Maria Naya (married 8 September 1717). His mother was widowed at the time she married Abbondo; her first marriage was to Giovanni Battista Massera. Abbondo's siblings were Maria Margherita, Pietro Francesco, Carlo Vittorio, Giovanni Eusebio, and another Maria Margherita.

The decisive factor in his Christian upbringing was the presence and example of his paternal uncle, Father Giovanni Carlo Abbondo. Giacomo attended school in Tronzano and received Confirmation from Cardinal Carlo Vincenzo Maria Ferreri on 15 December 1740. It was at this time his religious calling blossomed, and his father had, on 11 August 1738, announced his son's desire to become a priest. The same day as his Confirmation, the cardinal gave him the first clerical tonsure and on 12 August admitted him to minor orders. On 27 May 1741, the cardinal also gave him the minor orders of exorcism and acolyte.

Mgr. Giovanni Pietro Solaro elevated him to the subdiaconate on 21 December 1743 and elevated him to the diaconate on 29 February 1744.

=== Priesthood ===
He felt called to religious life and so decided to join the priesthood; he commenced his theological studies in Vercelli where he was ordained on 21 March 1744. He received a papal dispensation from Pope Clement XII for his ordination since he had not reached the canonical age for becoming a priest.

He obtained a degree in literature on 31 October 1748 in Turin and was assigned to teach in Vercelli. In 1757 he left teaching to remain as a simple parish priest.

He tried to help his parishioners to discover the goodness of God and to know and praise God. He believed that this was of greater importance since the previous pastor was a known Jansenist. He was devoted to the sacraments and was a renowned preacher. He loved the children and insisted that he be the one who admitted the Eucharist to them when the children were ten. He viewed his mission as a priest as a service that had to be available to all people.

Abbondo would visit his parishioners in their homes when he had the chance in his role as the head of thirteen churches but also did this in order to maintain fruitful relationships and connections with the people. He scheduled lectures each Lent season and on 3 April 1759 obtained from Pope Clement XIII the privilege of indulgences for those that partook of the spiritual exercises offered in Tronzano. He also referred to the spiritual exercises of Ignatius of Loyola as a guide. He preached to the Sisters of Saint Agatha in 1775 and to the Sisters of the Holy Spirit in 1782.

=== Death and burial ===
He died in 1788 with a deep reputation for holiness and was well known across the area for the pious life that he led. Pilgrimages to his tomb became common and there were immediate calls for his beatification to commence. His remains were later transferred on 13 March 1922. An elementary school was named in his honour in 1994.

== Beatification ==
The informative process of the cause commenced on 22 January 1923 with people attributing a wide range of miracles to his intercession. Abbondo's spiritual writings were approved by theologians on 20 November 1935. The cause for sainthood commenced on 25 January 2003 and the process that commenced in Vercelli bestowed upon him the title of Servant of God. This came after the Congregation for the Causes of Saints approved the opening of the cause with the declaration of "nihil obstat" (nothing against).

The Positio – documentation on his life of heroic virtue – was submitted to Rome on 5 December 2008 for assessment at the discretion of the C.C.S. Pope Francis declared him to be Venerable on 9 May 2014.

A miracle alleged to have resulted from his intercession was investigated and was validated on 5 December 2008. The medical board stationed in Rome approved the miracle on 26 June 2014 and theologians also granted their approval to the miracle on 20 November 2014. Pope Francis approved the miracle on 5 May 2015 and allowed for him to be beatified; the beatification took place in Vercelli on 11 June 2016; Cardinal Angelo Amato presided over the celebration. Present was Vercelli native Cardinal Tarcisio Bertone and a total of ten bishops.

The miracle in question involved the 1907 healing of the teenager Giovanni Domenico Viola.

=== Exhumation ===
His remains were exhumed on 5 November 2015 and placed at the foot of his old parish altar for the veneration of the faithful. Some of the remains left in his casket were taken to be used as relics.
