= Jean-Baptiste Fouque =

French Catholic priest (1851–1926)

Blessed Jean-Baptiste Fouque
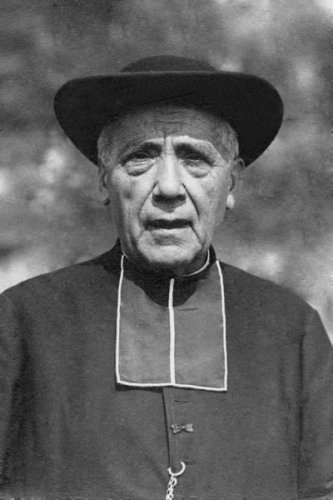
- Fouque c. 1920.

Priest
- Born: 19 September 1851; Marseille, France
- Died: 5 December 1926 (aged 75); Marseille, France
- Venerated in: Roman Catholic Church
- Beatified: 30 September 2018, Marseille, France by Cardinal Giovanni Angelo Becciu
- Feast: 5 December
- Attributes: Priest's attire
- Patronage: Saint Joseph's Hospital

Jean-Baptiste Fouque (19 September 1851 – 5 December 1926) was a French Roman Catholic priest. He tended to the poor during his time as a parish priest in Marseille and was noted for his desire to create a large and free hospital for them. He achieved this in 1921 and tended to the old and infirm in the hospital. Fouque also was known for his ministering to displaced peoples during World War I and for his commitment to evangelization.

His beatification cause opened in 2002 and he became titled as a Servant of God. Pope Francis named him as Venerable on 21 December 2016 and later confirmed his beatification; it was celebrated in Marseille on 30 September 2018.

== Life ==
Jean-Baptiste Fouque was born on 19 September 1851 in Marseille to Louis Fouque and Adèle Anne Remuzat. His parents married on 29 October 1850 and were devout in their faith.

He studied in the school that the Joseph-Marie Timon-David had opened; both David and Jean-Joseph Allemand proved to be Fouque's spiritual masters during his education and were also influences on his desire to enter the priesthood. Timon-David helped Fouque discern his call to the priesthood which Fouque had felt since the beginning of his adolescence. This event – his ordination – took place in Marseille on 10 June 1876. His first assignment following his ordination was to serve as a pastor in Auriol (December 1877 – July 1885) at the Sainte-Marguerite parish and then in La Major (1885–88). His final assignment was to serve at the Sainte Trinité parish from 15 April 1888 until his death over three decades later.

Fouque inaugurated "Le Sainte Famille" home for girls that he later entrusted to the nuns from the Presentation order from Tours. In December 1891 the archdiocesan vicar general asked Fouque to tend to the abandoned and to orphans. He threw himself into this work and created one such place that was transferred to a new location in 1894 and entrusted to nuns. He set himself on establishing this place following a Mass he celebrated on 3 October 1892 at Notre-Dame-de-la-Garde.

In 1903 he helped to establish a house for girls and also a home for poor domestic workers both in Marseille. In 1903 he also reopened the former boarding school of the Ladies of the Christian Doctrine while in 1905 – in a former convent – created "L'oeuvre de Salette" for the old and infirm. Fouque later founded "Le travail de l'enfance" on 27 November 1913 in Saint-Tronc which he later entrusted to the direction of a group of priests.

Between 1914 and 1918 – upon the outbreak of World War I – he tended to the wounded and displaced peoples. He had no financial means following the war but decided to appeal to doctors to care for the poor who had little finances to request their services. There were some doctors who agreed while Fouque decided to set something up that would ensure better treatment of the poor. He asked industrialists and merchants to help finance this venture which became the basis for his idea in 1919 to create a large and free hospital for the poor in Marseille. The people rallied behind him in this project and offered financial aid which resulted in Fouque inaugurating the Saint Joseph Hospital on 20 March 1921.

Fouque died on 5 December 1926 in the Saint Joseph Hospital. The people revered him as a saint and even referred to Fouque as the "Saint Vincent de Paul of Marseille". His remains were later transferred to the Saint Joseph's chapel in his old hospital on 29 April 1993.

== Beatification ==
The beatification process for Fouque commenced under Pope John Paul II on 6 July 2002 after the Congregation for the Causes of Saints issued the official "nihil obstat" (no objections to the cause) edict and titled Fouque as a Servant of God. The Cardinal Archbishop of Marseille Bernard Panafieu inaugurated the diocesan investigation into Fouque's life and works on 7 December 2002 and closed it a few months later on 15 March 2003. The C.C.S. validated this investigation twice in Rome on 4 July 2004 and on 9 November 2007.

The postulation (those leading the cause) compiled and submitted the Positio dossier to the C.C.S. for assessment in 2012. The theologians advising the C.C.S. assessed the dossier and approved the cause on 3 March 2016 while the cardinal and bishop members comprising the C.C.S. themselves approved the cause that 13 December. Fouque became titled as Venerable a week later on 21 December after Pope Francis confirmed that Fouque had lived a model life of heroic virtue.

Fouque's beatification depended all upon a miracle (often a healing science and medicine fail to explain) receiving papal recognition. One such case was discovered and was investigated in the French diocese it had originated from before the C.C.S. validated this investigation later in Rome on 1 February 2013. Medical experts confirmed that the healing had no scientific explanation while consulting theologians determined that the miracle came as a result of Fouque's intercession. The cardinal and bishop members of the C.C.S. later confirmed these findings at their meeting on 5 December 2017. Pope Francis provided papal recognition for this miracle more than a week after on 18 December in a move that confirmed that Fouque would soon be beatified.

The beatification took place on 30 September 2018 in Marseille.

The current postulator for this cause is the Premonstratensian priest Bernard Ardura.
