= Thomas Saleh =

Lebanese Maronite priest

Blessed Thomas Saleh OFMCap
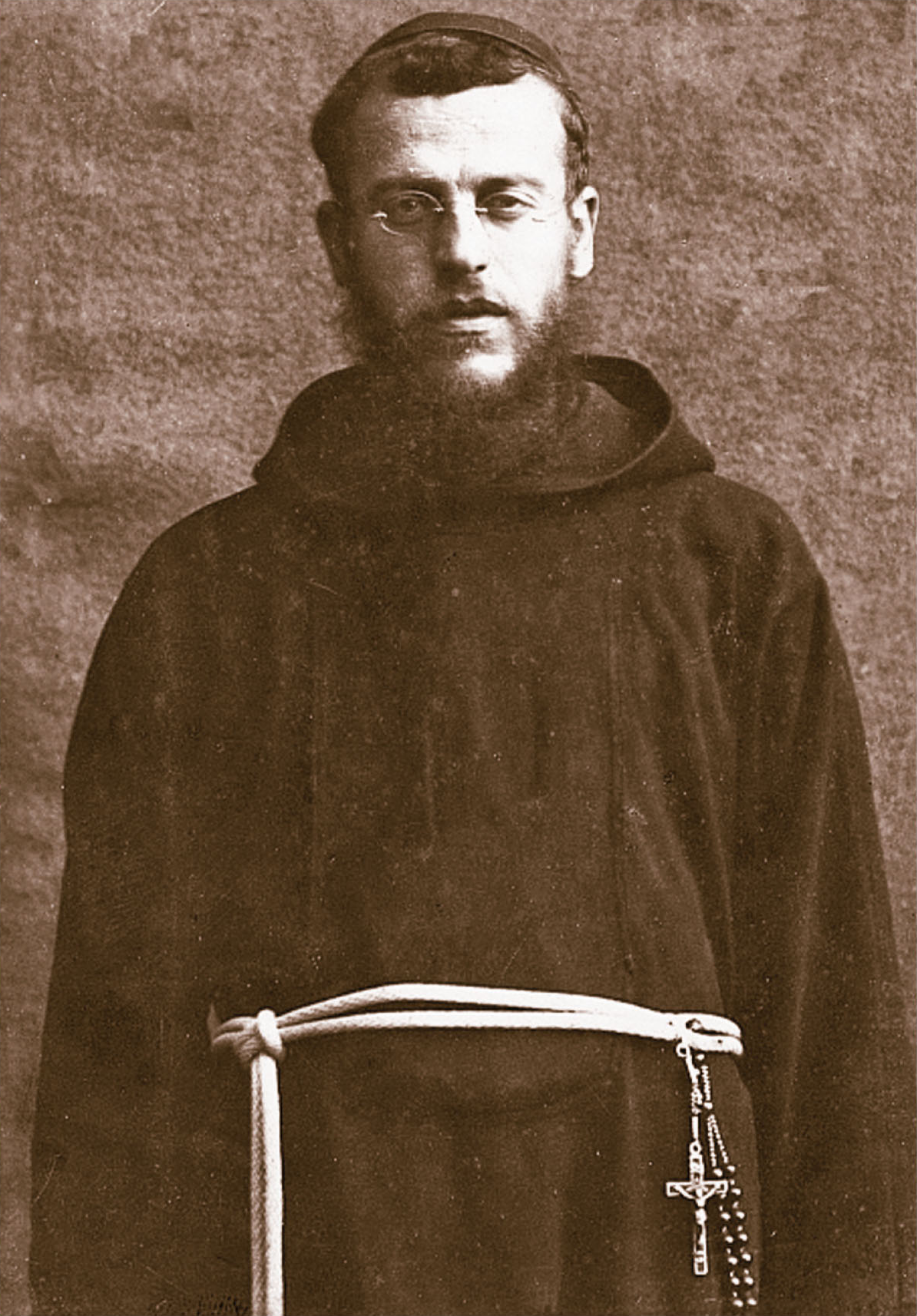

Martyr
- Born: Jirays H̱anā S̱āleẖ; 3 May 1879; B'abdāt, El Metn, Jabal Lubnān, Lebanon
- Died: 28 February 1917 (aged 37); Kahramanmaraş, Ottoman Empire
- Venerated in: Roman Catholic Church; Eastern Catholic Churches
- Beatified: 4 June 2022, Couvent de la Croix, Bqennaya, Lebanon by Cardinal Marcello Semeraro
- Feast: 10 June
- Attributes: Franciscan habit

Thomas Saleh (3 May 1879 – 28 February 1917), born Jirays H̱anā S̱āleẖ, religious name Thūmā from B'abdāt, was a Lebanese Maronite priest of the Order of Friars Minor Capuchin. Saleh joined the Franciscans in Istanbul and carried out his novitiate period there before he made his profession in mid-1900 and was ordained to the priesthood in late 1904. He tended to the missions and worked with his peer Leonard Melki; he dedicated himself to the mission school and was a noted preacher. He was transferred in 1910 but expelled in late 1914 once World War I and the Assyrian Genocide[commenced. Saleh was arrested in 1916 after the police planted evidence in his convent to frame him to make an arrest. He was mistreated in prison before he died from exhaustion from the torture in addition to the disease that ailed him in his imprisonment. He refused to capitulate to his captors to convert to Islam and refused to abandon his faith.

The beatification process for Saleh commenced in 2005 in Beirut and he became titled as a Servant of God upon its initiation. Pope Francis determined in 2020 that Saleh had died "ex aerumnis carceris" (from the hardships of incarceration) and permitted for Saleh to be beatified. He and his peer Leonard Melki were beatified on 4 June 2022.

== Life ==
Thomas Saleh was born in B'abdāt on 3 May 1879 as the fifth of six sons and he was baptized within the week before he received his Confirmation on 19 November 1893.

From his adolescence he felt attracted to the traits and example that the Franciscans demonstrated but had a particular interest in the Capuchins; he asked to join them and was first sent to their educational institution at Saint Stephen's in Istanbul on 28 April 1895 where he carried out his novitiate period. He was vested in the Franciscan habit for the first time on 2 July 1899. It was also around this point that he felt an attraction to join the missions as he liked the idea of preaching and administering the sacraments in different places. Saleh made his initial religious profession on 2 July 1900 and was ordained to the priesthood on 4 December 1904 after he completed his philosophical and theological education in Buca where he had made his solemn perpetual profession on 2 July 1903. Saleh was first assigned to work in the missions at Mesopotamia in Mardin where he worked with his friend and peer Leonard Melki where he dedicated himself to the mission school after he completed his final examinations on 23 April 1906. But he also became a noted preacher and administered the sacraments to the poor and it took him to different places such as Kharput where he would hear confessions and teach students whom he introduced to the Third Order of Saint Francis which he collaborated with. But in 1910 he was transferred to Diarbékir but was expelled from the area due to the critical political situation alongside other missionaries and nuns on 22 December 1914 which forced him to relocate to Urfa.

But the outbreak of World War I in 1914 served to exacerbate the violence in the Ottoman Empire in 1915 that led to a wave of genocide. The persecution against Christians became much more widespread and led to mass deportations and exterminations with hundreds being led to their deaths and some without trial. Even the pleas from Pope Benedict XV was unable to deter these deportations and killings and the Church was forced to make clandestine gestures to save people from the dangers. He knew the risks involved with his apostolate and continued to preach and tend to the poor despite police harassment and several massacres in the surrounding areas; he hid at one point in a convent with an Armenian priest but was unable to stop that priest's arrest on 24 September 1916. (Note: Different sources suggest that he and his peers were arrested upon the accusation of hiding an Armenian priest and had a weapon in their possession which was a false accusation.) That arrest made the police suspicious of Saleh and decided to monitor him. Saleh even learned that his friend Leonard Melki had been slain in June 1915 after false accusations had been levelled against him. The police demonstrated a strong anti-religious sentiment and became determined to arrest Saleh as time went on. This led to the police undertaking a search of the convent and discovered a small revolver that the police had planted there in order for them to make a justified arrest. This saw Saleh arrested on 4 January 1917 where he was mistreated in prison and was locked up with infected prisoners to the point that he contracted typhus that saw his weakened constitution deteriorate further.

Saleh died from his disease and the exhaustion from the torture that he endured on 28 February 1917 in Kahramanmaraş. (Note: Different sources suggest that Saleh died on 17 or 18 January 1917.) His condition had deteriorated due to other factors such as the fact that he was relocated in different prisons and was forced to endure several death marches with the other prisoners. His time in prison saw his captors attempt to have Saleh renounce his faith and convert to Islam which he refused. His brutal death saw his captors kill him with scimitar blows and an axe with his remains thrown in wells and caves. He repeated during his imprisonment and in the moments that led to his death: "I have full confidence in God; I am not afraid of death". He exhorted in his final moments for his companions to trust in God and asked Jesus through the Eucharist to be able to bear the sufferings of the persecuted.

== Beatification ==
The diocesan process opened on 17 February 2007 and was closed on 28 October 2009. The Congrgation for the Causes of Saints validated the process as having complied with their procedures on 1 October 2012 and received the official "Positio" dossier from the postulation (officials that lead the cause) in 2017 to investigate.

Pope Francis signed a decree on 27 October 2020 that determined that Saleh died ex aerumnis carceris ("from the hardships of incarceration") and could be beatified. The beatification took place on 4 June 2022 at the Couvent de la Croix in Bqennaya with Cardinal Marcello Semeraro presiding over the rite on the pope's behalf.

The postulator for the cause is the Capuchin friar Carlo Calloni.

== See also ==
- Leonard Melki
