= María Emilia Riquelme y Zayas =

Spanish Roman Catholic religious sister

Blessed María Emilia Riquelme y Zayas

Religious
- Born: 5 August 1847; Granada, Spain
- Died: 10 December 1940 (aged 93); Granada, Spain
- Venerated in: Roman Catholic Church
- Beatified: 9 November 2019, Granada Cathedral, Granada, Spain by Cardinal Giovanni Angelo Becciu
- Feast: 10 December
- Attributes: Religious habit
- Patronage: Misioneras del Santísimo Sacramento y María Inmaculada

María Emilia Riquelme y Zayas (5 August 1847 – 10 December 1940) was a Spanish Roman Catholic religious sister and the founder of the Misioneras del Santísimo Sacramento y María Inmaculada. In her childhood she moved from place to place, since her father was an officer and was moved to different barracks across the nation. All the while she studied in boarding schools to perfect her knowledge in French and art. After her schooling she felt drawn to the religious life (based on a vision she experienced when she was seven) and set herself on entering a convent after her father (who opposed this vocation) died. But ill health forced her to give up this idea and she instead founded a congregation of her own alongside several like-minded women who made the poor the focus of their apostolate. This congregation would spread within Spain (such as in Barcelona in 1900) and later across to other countries such as Portugal and Bolivia.

Riquelme's cause for beatification was launched in Granada in 1982 when she was named a Servant of God. The cause was furthered on 14 December 2015 when Pope Francis named her as Venerable, upon confirming that she had practiced heroic virtue throughout her life. Francis also confirmed a miracle attributed to her intercession and she was beatified in Granada on 9 November 2019.

== Early life ==
María Emilia Riquelme y Zayas was born on 5 August 1847 in the house of her maternal grandparents in Granada, to the pious Joaquín Riquelme y Gómez (17 August 1812 – February 1885; he became a cadet aged thirteen and was a strong patriot) and María Emilia Zayas Fernández de Córdoba y de la Vega (13 July 1815 – 28 June 1855). Her parents married in 1846. Her father was a distinguished officer who advanced to the rank of Lieutenant General. Riquelme's maternal ancestor was Gonzalo Fernández de Córdoba who was known as "the Great Captain". Her father was disappointed with her birth since he wanted his firstborn to be a son who would continue his name and would serve as a cadet, but despite this came to love his daughter. Riquelme was baptized on 7 August 1847 in the Tabernacle parish (where her parents had married) as "María Emilia Joaquina Rosario Josefa Nieves de la Santísima Trinidad".

Her parents had a son in 1849 named Joaquín (known also as Joaquinillo) which caused his father great happiness but that child – who became an ensign – died in Seville when he was seventeen, leaving his father without an heir and a son in the armed forces. In 1851 her father was sent to Navarre, where he went along with wife and daughter. Riquelme's mother died when she was seven. It was at this age that she experienced a vision of the Blessed Mother holding the Infant Jesus. This vision caused her to devote herself to God. She consecrated herself to the Virgen del Carmen, and in 1859 made a private vow to remain chaste.

Riquelme had been the firstborn and her brother Joaquinillo followed in 1849. Her parents had a third child – Blanca Riquelme y Zayas – who was born in 1853 but died before Christmas in 1854. The couple then had their fourth child in 1854, who died not long after birth in Madrid. It was following the death of their pregnant mother (who died on 28 June 1855 in Granada due to an outbreak of cholera) that she and Joaquinillo moved with their father into the home of their maternal grandparents. On 5 August 1863 her father received an appointment to Madrid but Joaquinillo suffered from a chronic lung disease, and so Joaquín asked to be posted to the Canary Islands in the hope that his son would recover in a milder climate. But his condition worsened and so the three relocated to Seville where Joaquinillo died on 2 May 1866 (or 14 July 1865 as other sources suggest). It was after this that her father was sent to La Coruña where he was posted during the 1868 Liberal Revolution that saw the dethronement of Isabella II. Her father sent her to Madrid to live with his sister Pepa while he was sent into exile in Lisbon in Portugal.

In her schooling she studied art and singing as well as piano, along with languages including French. She attended boarding schools in Seville and Madrid and finished her education at age fifteen, an expert rider and fluent in French. Riquelme lived in Pamplona and Tenerife with her father and then settled in La Coruña, his last posting before his exile to Lisbon. While in exile, he sent his daughter to live with relatives in Madrid. It was around this time that her diplomat cousin Eduardo Díaz del Moral y Riquelme and others began acting as suitors in the hopes of being wed to her. But Riquelme's religious vocation was then her primary concern and she refused these requests. It was also around this stage that her spiritual director was Marcelo Spínola y Maestre (future cardinal) in Seville, who advised her to associate with the Vincentians in their charitable works. On one occasion – when her father called her to Lisbon – she was involved in an automobile accident that left her unscathed and her father with cuts to his face.

== Vocation ==
During her adolescence she ended up confiding her vocation to her father who was opposed to it and so arranged social events for her to attend in a vain effort to distract her. But she ignored most of these events set out for her and instead would visit hospitals and aid the poor. Funds that she received she distributed to women to keep them from prostitution or to men who felt called to enter the priesthood (one of those being the future Archbishop of Madrid Leopoldo Eijo y Garay). Riquelme's father died in February 1885 and so she tried entering the religious life at a convent but was forced to give up on this due to a series of health issues. It was following this that she constructed a small chapel at home with canonical approval and would spend her free time ministering to the poor. Her work with the poor soon attracted like-minded women to join her, leading to the religious congregation she would found. She established the Missionárias do Santíssimo Sacramento e Maria Imaculada in 1896. The Archbishop of Granada José Moreno y Mazón gave it archdiocesan approval in 1896 and from then until her death she served as its Superior General. On 25 March 1896 (the official founding of her congregation) she and seven others received the religious habit from the archbishop, with Riquelme making her perpetual profession as a religious sister. In 1900 she opened the congregation's second house in Barcelona and around that time founded a school for poor girls in Granada. During the following decade she traveled to Rome to obtain for the congregation the pontifical decree of praise and the official papal approval, received from Pope Pius X in 1912. In 1936 the outbreak of the Spanish Civil War forced her to flee to France to escape the anti-religious sentiment and persecution. She returned to Spain after the conflict.

Riquelme died at her motherhouse in Granada on 10 December 1940. Her congregation would spread to countries across the globe such as Portugal and the United States of America. Her remains were later exhumed and relocated in 2008.

== Beatification ==
The beatification process commenced on 19 June 1982 after the Congregation for the Causes of Saints in Rome titled Riquelme as a Servant of God and issued the official "nihil obstat" (no objections) edict for the cause to begin. The Archbishop of Granada José Méndez Asensio inaugurated the cognitional process (the official investigation into her life and reputation for holiness) on 11 May 1983 and closed it on 28 April 1991. The C.C.S. validated the process on 14 March 1992 as having complied with their regulations in conducting causes. The postulators drafted and submitted the official Positio dossier to the C.C.S. officials in 1996 for further investigation.

Theologians assessed the Positio and approved the cause on 18 May 2007. The C.C.S. cardinal and bishop members likewise met on 11 October 2011 but had to meet again on 1 December 2015 to further discuss it and give their approval to the cause. Riquelme became titled as Venerable on 14 December 2015 after Pope Francis signed a decree that acknowledged that she had practiced heroic virtue throughout her life.

Riquelme's beatification depended upon the papal confirmation of a single miracle attributed to her intercession which in most cases would be a healing that would neither have a medical or scientific explanation. Such a case was investigated in Colombia before it was sent to the C.C.S. who validated that investigation on 8 February 2008. Medical experts confirmed the miraculous nature of the healing on 30 January 2018, and theologians on 12 October 2018 determined that the healing came from the intercession of Riquelme. The C.C.S. cardinal and bishop members on 5 March 2019 confirmed the healing was indeed a miracle. Pope Francis signed a decree on 19 March 2019 that acknowledged the miracle, leading to her beatification in Granada on 9 November 2019.

The current postulator for this cause is Dr. Silvia Mónica Correale.
