= Isidore Ngei Ko Lat =

Birmanese Roman Catholic catechist and blessed

Blessed Isidoro Ngei Ko Lat
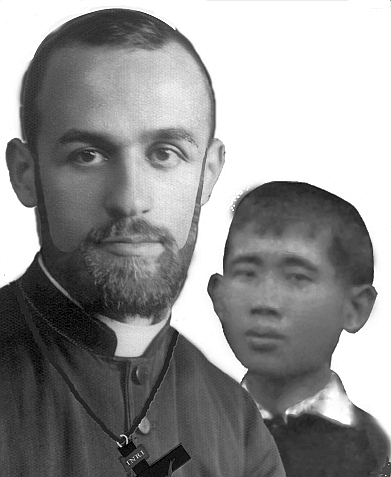
- Isidore (right) and his companion Vergara.

Catechist, Martyr
- Born: 7 September 1918; Ahtet Tawpon, Kayin, Burma
- Died: 24 May 1950 (aged 31); Shadaw, Kayah, Union of Burma
- Venerated in: Catholic Church
- Beatified: 24 May 2014, Cathedral of San Paolo, Aversa, Caserta, Italy by Cardinal Angelo Amato
- Feast: 24 May

Isidoro Ngei Ko Lat (17 September 1918 – 24 May 1950) was a Catholic catechist from Myanmar who was killed in 1950. He was beatified in 2014. He is the first Myanma Catholic to be beatified.

== Biography ==
Isidoro Ngei Ko Lat was the son of peasants and the priest Dominic Pedrotti baptized him on 7 September 1918. His parents died when he was young and both he and his younger brother were cared for by their aunt and uncle. By 1925, he began attending primary school in his village.

As he grew older, he expressed a desire to serve God and his vocation led him to the minor seminary of Saint Teresa where he studied for six years until World War II started. During the war, he returned to his village and became a teacher where he opened a school for the village children.

In 1946, Italian priest Mario Vergara arrived for his mission in Myanmar, and he met Ko Lat. He asked Ko Lat to join him in his missionary work. After the 1948 independence of Myanmar, he and Vergara were threatened by the guerillas in Myanmar. The two were working in Kayah state and had accepted help from the government while travelling; this led to them being seen as enemies of the local rebels. On May 24, 1950 Ko Lat and Vergara met with a rebel leader to demand the release of another catechist who had been arrested; after interrogation, both were shot dead.

== Beatification ==
The Congregation for the Causes of Saints approved the cause of beatification which commenced on 23 October 2001. This bestowed upon him the title of Servant of God. Pope Francis approved his and Vergara's martyrdom on 9 December 2013, thus, allowing for their beatification. Cardinal Angelo Amato represented the pope at the beatification on 24 May 2014.
