= Francesco Mottola =

Italian Roman Catholic priest

Blessed Francesco Mottola
- Born: 3 January 1901; Tropea, Vibo Valentia, Kingdom of Italy
- Died: 29 June 1969 (aged 68); Tropea, Vibo Valentia, Italy
- Venerated in: Roman Catholic Church
- Beatified: 10 October 2021, Santuario di Santa Maria dell'Isola, Tropea, Italy by Cardinal Marcello Semeraro
- Feast: 30 June

Francesco Mottola (3 January 1901 – 29 June 1969) was an Italian Roman Catholic priest and the founder of the Secular Institute of the Oblates of the Sacred Heart.

Pope Benedict XVI recognized his life of heroic virtue and declared the late priest to be Venerable on 17 December 2007. The miracle that is needed for his beatification was approved on 3 October 2019 and he was originally to have been beatified on 30 May 2020. The COVID-19 pandemic subsequently delayed the announced date of beatification which was originally scheduled for 30 May 2020, however, it was later celebrated in Tropea on 10 October 2021.

== Life ==
Francesco Mottola was born in Tropea in 1901 to Antonio Mottola and Concetta Braghò. His mother committed suicide in 1913.

He attended a grammar school in Tropea before he commenced his studies to become a priest in 1911 and then moved in 1917 for further studies at Catanzaro. While in the seminary he visited the Blessed Sacrament frequently and had a devotion to the Madonna di Romania. He studied theological and philosophical studies in Catanzaro and was ordained to the priesthood on 5 April 1924. He involved himself in some form with the work of Catholic Action in the area while teaching theological subjects for a brief period of time.

He was the rector in Tropea from 1929 until 1942 and was appointed as the canon of the cathedral in 1931. He organized small groups in 1935 and after that to establish charitable groups to assist others. He founded such homes for the disabled in Tropea and abroad in places like Rome. He established the Secular Institute of the Oblates of the Sacred Heart around this time. His order received diocesan approval on 25 September 1968.

Mottola suffered a severe illness in 1942 and continued to exercise his functions despite this great impediment that remained with him until his death a couple of decades later.

He died in Tropea on 29 June 1969.

== Beatification ==
The process for beatification commenced on 15 October 1981 and granted him the title of Servant of God. The process that commenced on a local level went from 1982 until 1988; the process was validated on 22 June 1990. The Positio was forwarded to Rome in 1994 and Pope Benedict XVI declared him to be Venerable on 17 December 2007 after he recognized his life of heroic virtue.

A miracle attributed to his intercession was investigated from 8 August 2012 to 5 April 2013 and was ratified on 7 March 2014 for the Congregation for the Causes of Saints to begin their own evaluation. The miracle was approved on 3 October 2019 and the beatification was originally to have been celebrated on 30 May 2020. The COVID-19 pandemic subsequently delayed the announced date of beatification but it was announced on 24 August 2021 that the beatification shall be celebrated on 10 October 2021.
