= Thiago Bordin =

Brazilian ballet dancer (born 1983)

Thiago Bordin (born 1983 in São Paulo) is a Brazilian/German ballet dancer, teacher, and choreographer.
