= Mario Vergara =

Italian Catholic priest (1910–1950)

Blessed Mario Vergara
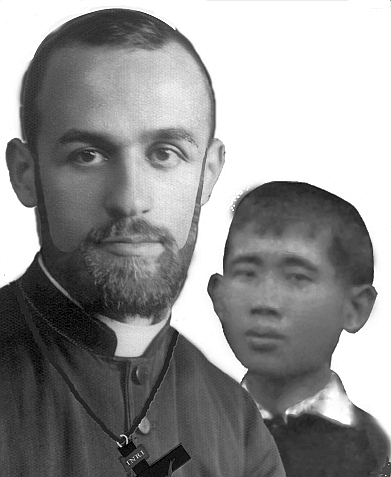
- Church: Catholic Church

Orders
- Ordination: 25 August 1934 by Alfredo Ildefonso Schuster
- Rank: Priest

Personal details
- Born: Mario Vergara; 16 November 1910 Frattamaggiore, Naples, Kingdom of Italy
- Died: 24 May 1950 (aged 39) Shadaw, Kayah, Union of Burma
- Denomination: Roman Catholic

Sainthood
- Feast day: 24 May
- Venerated in: Roman Catholic Church
- Beatified: 24 May 2014; Cathedral of San Paolo, Aversa, Caserta, Italy by Cardinal Angelo Amato

Mario Vergara (16 November 1910 – 24 May 1950) was an Italian Catholic priest of the Pontifical Institute for Foreign Missions who was killed in Burma (now Myanmar) in 1950. He was beatified in 2014 after the recognition of his martyrdom.

== Biography ==
Mario Vergara was born on 16 November 1910 and was baptized on 20 November - a week after his birth. He was the last of nine children.

He entered the seminary in Aversa and studied there until the age of 17 when he was admitted to a seminary in Naples. It was there where his missionary vocation emerged. In 1929, he entered the seminary in Monza and he later received the tonsure and the minor orders by the Bishop of Aversa in 1932.

He was admitted into the novitiate of the Pontifical Institute for Foreign Missions in August 1933 and he was ordained to the priesthood on 26 August 1934 by the Cardinal Archbishop of Milan Alfredo Ildefonso Schuster. By September that same year, he travelled to Burma to begin his missionary activities.

Vergara was entrusted with the district of Citaciò and the forests of Soku. He ensured that there be regular catechesis lessons and the celebration of the sacraments. He also established various assistance services and an orphanage for children.

When World War II started, Vergara and other Italian missionaries were interned in a British concentration camp in India in 1941; he was kept there until the end of the war. After he was released he travelled to Delhi and later to Calcutta in June 1946. It was there that he underwent nephrectomy surgery. He returned to Burma in 1947 and continued his mission there, and met the catechist Isidore Ngei Ko Lat. The two worked together in the villages.

After the nation gained independence in 1948, both Vergara and Ko Lat received death threats. The two were working in Kayah state and had accepted help from the government while travelling; this led to them being seen as enemies of the local rebels. On 24 May 1950, Vergara and Ko Lat met with a rebel leader to demand the release of another catechist who had been arrested; after interrogation, both were shot dead.

== Beatification ==
The Congregation for the Causes of Saints approved the cause of beatification which commenced on 23 October 2001. This bestowed upon him the title of Servant of God. Pope Francis approved his and Isidoro Ngei Ko Lat's martyrdom on 9 December 2013, thus, allowing for their beatification. Cardinal Angelo Amato represented the pope at the beatification on 24 May 2014.
