= Pedro Asúa Mendía =

Spanish Roman Catholic priest and engineer

Blessed Pedro Asúa Mendía
- Church: Roman Catholic Church
- Previous posts: Engineer, Architect

Orders
- Ordination: 14 June 1924
- Rank: Priest

Personal details
- Born: Pedro Asúa Mendía; 30 August 1890 Balmaseda, Vizcaya, Kingdom of Spain
- Died: 29 August 1936 (aged 45) Liendo, Spanish Republic
- Denomination: Roman Catholic
- Parents: Isidro Luis Asúa y San Millán & Francisca Mendía y Conde
- Education: Mount Saint Mary's University

Sainthood
- Feast day: 29 August
- Venerated in: Roman Catholic Church
- Title as Saint: Blessed
- Beatified: 1 November 2014; Vitoria, Spain by Cardinal Angelo Amato
- Attributes: Priest's cassock
- Patronage: Architects; Engineers; Persecuted Christians

Pedro Asúa Mendía (30 August 1890 – 29 August 1936) was a Spanish Roman Catholic priest and engineer. He studied under the Jesuits and he trained also as an architect. He graduated in that field in 1915. He worked on schools and houses for religious across Spain where he served as a priest. He was killed in hatred of his faith during the Spanish Civil War.

He was beatified on 1 November 2014 in recognition of his murder. Cardinal Angelo Amato - on behalf of Pope Francis - presided over his beatification in Vitoria.

== Life ==
Pedro Asúa Mendía was born in Spain on 30 August 1890 to Isidro Luis Asúa y San Millán and Francisca Mendía y Conde as their fifth son. He was baptized within the week in the church of San Severino.

The Jesuits and the Daughters of the Cross oversaw his education - which concluded in 1906 - and he also studied as both an engineer and an architect between October 1906 and December 1914. He graduated in those two capacities in 1915 and went on to work on schools as well as churches and houses for religious. His vocation to religious life came at a slow pace and he soon realized that his true calling was not to his newfound profession but a life of service to God.

He commenced his studies for the priesthood in October 1919. He studied both theological subjects in Madrid and later in Vitoria. He was ordained into the diaconate in December 1923 and was ordained to the priesthood on 14 June 1924. He was assigned as a priest in the Diocese of Vitoria.

He was granted the title Monsignor during the pontificate of Pope Pius XI.

Mendía was forced to flee on 25 August 1936 after he celebrated what was his last Mass but he was captured and murdered on 29 August 1936 after militiamen cornered and killed him. He blessed his killers and said: "God forgive you, as I forgive in the name of the Father, the Son and the Holy Spirit". He was shot in the upper body. His corpse was found a few weeks later by a shepherd. His remains were exhumed once on 31 July 1938 and buried in the family tomb in Valmaseda. His remains were later transferred in 1955.

== Beatification ==
The beatification process commenced on 14 December 1960 in the pontificate of Pope John XXIII and involved the accumulation of documentation and witness testimonies from the point the process opened until mid 1962. The process closed until 30 September 2005 under Pope John Paul II when the "nihil obstat" (nothing against") was granted for the cause to continue its work. The two processes that began decades before were both ratified on 30 November 2007 in order for the cause to proceed to the next stage.

The Positio - an account of his life and reasons he was killed in hatred of the faith - was submitted to the Congregation for the Causes of Saints in 2009 for further evaluation. Pope Francis approved the findings in 2014 and allowed for his beatification on 1 November 2014 in Spain. Cardinal Angelo Amato presided over the Mass on behalf of the pope.
