= Luigi Bordino =

Blessed Luigi Bordino
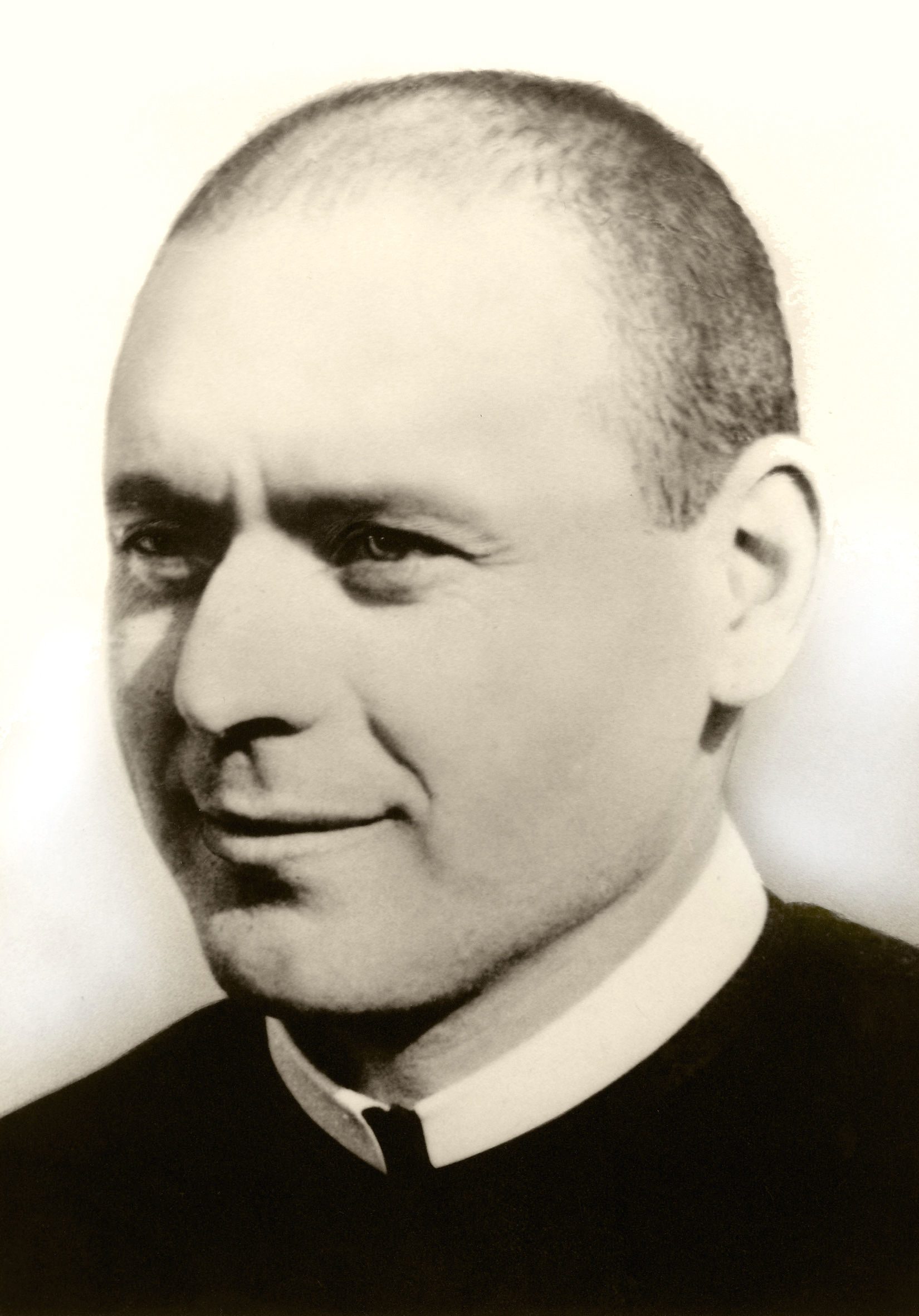
- Father Bordino.

Priest
- Born: 12 August 1922; Castellinaldo, Alba, Kingdom of Italy
- Died: 25 August 1977 (aged 55); Turin, Italy
- Venerated in: Roman Catholic Church
- Beatified: 2 May 2015, Turin, Italy by Cardinal Angelo Amato
- Feast: 25 August
- Attributes: Sacred Heart

Luigi Bordino (12 August 1922 - 25 August 1977), born Andrea Bordino, was a Catholic Religious Brother and a member of the Brothers of Saint Joseph Benedict Cottolengo. He assumed the name of "Luigi of the Consolata" after he entered that order.

He was cleared for beatification after a miracle was found to have been attributed to his intercession and he was beatified on 2 May 2015 in Turin by Cardinal Angelo Amato on behalf of Pope Francis.

== Biography ==
Bordino was born in 1922 to a family of winemakers. He was the third of four sisters and four brothers. His parents provided for his education and attended kindergarten that Sister Ernestina ran. He didn't excel in his studies but increased his commitment to them. In the summers he and his older brother Risbaldo would assist his father in his work.

At the age of eighteen in 1941 he was named as the president of the local branch of Catholic Action. In January 1942, he was drafted at the age of nineteen into the military of the Cuneo Alps. There, Bordino accompanied his comrades into Poland and later into Ukraine where Bordino provided for his fellow soldiers.

On 26 January 1943, Bordino and his brother were taken as prisoners by the Soviet Union soldiers. He was to contract typhus, and was later transferred to Siberia, surviving a year of the disease. He was later released from his imprisonment, and allowed to return home.

He became a member of the Brothers of Saint Joseph Benedict Cottolengo and assumed the name of "Luigi of the Consolata". He worked for those hospitalized and also worked with those who had mental illnesses.

He contracted leukemia in 1975. After learning this he approached the superior general of the order and stated: "I am sorry because I can no longer do much for the sick, not even for the family of the Brothers; I can no longer help; for everything else, it is the will of God to the end, and I want to do it cheerfully. These are the moments of faith". He underwent treatment and after he was released went to recover. He would return for more tests and treatment at the hospital each month.

His condition declined in at the beginning of 1977 and continued to worsen in February. Bordino requested to leave the hospital realizing that his end was near. He received the Anointing of the Sick and went to visit the Cardinal Archbishop of Turin Michele Pellegrino on 26 February. He was offered the choice of travelling to the United States of America for special treatment, but declined stating: "I will not make such a long journey on a stretcher and dying in America: I have duties to my community".

His sister Pia rushed to his bedside where he died on 25 August 1977.

== Beatification ==
The cause of beatification commenced on 17 November 1990 on a local level and he was declared a Servant of God. On 12 April 2003, Pope John Paul II declared him to have lived a life of heroic virtue and named him Venerable.

On 3 April 2014, Pope Francis approved a decree that recognized a miracle attributed to his intercession which cleared the way for his beatification. The beatification was celebrated by Cardinal Angelo Amato on 2 May 2015 in Turin.
