= Maria Gargani =

Italian member of the Secular Franciscan Order

Blessed Maria Gargani TOFS

Virgin
- Born: 23 December 1892; Morra de Sanctis, Avellino, Kingdom of Italy
- Died: 23 May 1973 (aged 80); Naples, Italy
- Venerated in: Roman Catholic Church
- Beatified: 2 June 2018, Naples, Italy by Cardinal Angelo Amato
- Feast: 24 May
- Patronage: Sisters Apostles of the Sacred Heart

Maria Gargani, religious name Maria Crocifissa del Divino Amore, (23 December 1892 - 23 May 1973), was an Italian member of the Secular Franciscan Order and the founder of the Sisters Apostles of the Sacred Heart. Gargani was involved with Catholic Action during her teaching career but is best known for having been a close friend and correspondent with Pio from Pietrelcina from World War I until the saint's death in 1968; the saint wrote a total of 67 letters to Gargani during this period.

The cause for her beatification opened in 1988 and she became titled as a Servant of God. Pope Francis named her as venerable in mid-2017 and later approved a miracle attributed to her in 2018 which confirmed she would be beatified. The beatification took place in Naples in the metropolitan cathedral on 2 June 2018.

== Life ==
Maria Gargani was born in the evening on 23 December 1892 in Morra de Sanctis as the last of eight children to Rocco Gargani and Angiolina De Paola. Her devout father instructed the children in catechism and it was from him that Gargani's faith grew over time.

Her education was spent in her hometown before finishing it in Avellino where she was the guest of an uncle; she obtained a master's degree in 1913 that would allow her to begin work as a teacher.

Gargani began teaching in San Marco la Catola in Foggia from 1913 to 1928 and lived there alongside her married sister Antonietta. It was also there that she first met the priests Benedetto and Agostino Daniele who both became spiritual guides for her as she discerned her vocation. It was in 1914 that this manifested and she recorded that she wept as she discerned her call to follow God due to the seriousness of the task. Gargani later entered the Secular Franciscan Order after having discovered Francis of Assisi. Francis represented to her a model of love that served as an influence on her religious convictions. Not long after this she began teaching catechism to children while also preparing them for the reception of their First Communion and she even purchased a machine to project images to explain to them the life of Jesus Christ. Gargani also began collaborating with Catholic Action around this time. From 1928 to 1945 she began teaching in Volturara Appula.

In 1915 her advisor Agostino Daniele was summoned to serve in World War I as a chaplain and so entrusted her to the spiritual care of the Franciscan Capuchin priest Padre Pio while advising Gargani to maintain correspondence with the friar. Gargani made first contact with the friar at the beginning of August 1916 via letter which began several decades of friendship and correspondence that lasted until Pio's death in 1968. The first letter Pio wrote to her was dated 26 August 1916. Pio became a spiritual guide for Gargani as well as a source of moral support. The two met for the first time face-to-face in the Capuchin convent at San Marco la Catola in mid-April 1918.

In 1934 she received diocesan permission to form a group of companions in the former convent of Santa Maria della Sanità - this became the foundation for the religious congregation that she would establish not long after. Gargani later established the Sisters Apostles of the Sacred Heart on 11 February 1936 with the permission of the Archbishop of Lucca Antonio Torrini; the first convent for the order opened that 21 April. In 1945 the order moved its headquarters to Naples while that 18 April - with other companions - she made her profession as Maria Crocifissa del Divino Amore. From 1946 until her retirement she taught in Naples. On 21 July 1951 - in the Santuario della Beata Vergine del Rosario di Pompei - she met the priest Antonio Fanucci who became her new spiritual director. Her order later received diocesan approval from Cardinal Marcello Mimmi on 2 June 1956 and she made her perpetual profession a month later on 22 July. Pope John XXIII granted her order full pontifical approval on 12 March 1963.

Gargani died in mid-1973 in her room in Naples; her remains were later exhumed and relocated to the order's motherhouse on 17 May 1992.

== Beatification ==
The beatification process opened under Pope John Paul II on 31 May 1988 after the Congregation for the Causes of Saints titled Gargani as a Servant of God and issued the official edict declaring "nihil obstat" (no objections to the cause). Cardinal Michele Giordano inaugurated the diocesan process of investigation on 12 September 1988 and later closed it on 16 May 2002; the documentation was sent to Rome to the C.C.S. who validated the diocesan process on 21 March 2003. From 2007 the postulation began compiling the Positio dossier which was a collation of all documentation and interrogatories gathered from the diocesan process. This dossier was submitted to the C.C.S. later in 2013. Pope Francis later confirmed that Gargani had lived a model life of heroic virtue on 7 July 2017 and titled her as Venerable.

Her beatification depended upon papal confirmation of a miracle (a healing in most cases) that science and medicine fail to explain. One such case was investigated in a southern Italian province in a diocesan investigation that the C.C.S. later validated on 28 October 2011. Pope Francis later confirmed this healing to be a legitimate miracle on 26 January 2018 which cleared Gargani for beatification.

The beatification took place on 2 June 2018 in Naples. Cardinal Angelo Amato presided over the beatification on the pope's behalf with Cardinal Crescenzio Sepe and Cardinal Philippe Ouédraogo in attendance.

The current postulator for this cause is Giuditta Esselen Juran.

=== Miracle ===
The miracle that led to her beatification was the 1975 healing of the woman Michelina Formichella from Torrecuso in the Benevento province. Formichella died of a heart attack in 2015.
