= Louis-Édouard Cestac =

French Catholic priest; beatified

Blessed Louis-Édouard Cestac
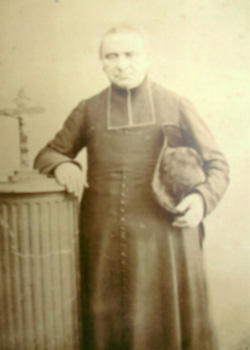

Priest
- Born: 6 January 1801; Bayonne, Pyrénées-Atlantiques, French First Republic
- Died: 27 March 1868 (aged 67); Anglet, Pyrénées-Atlantiques, Second French Empire
- Venerated in: Roman Catholic Church
- Beatified: 31 May 2015, Bayonne, France by Cardinal Angelo Amato
- Feast: 27 March
- Attributes: Priest's attire
- Patronage: Servants of Mary

Louis-Édouard Cestac (6 January 1801 – 27 March 1868) was a French Roman Catholic priest and alongside his sister Marie-Louise-Élise co-founded the Serviteurs de Marie. Cestac was dedicated to the needs of the poor and he met with them on a frequent basis in order to get to know them better and to know how he could better serve them in terms of their material and spiritual needs. But he was concerned for girls who were poor and destitute and so decided to provide them with a stable environment. He enlisted the aid of his sister and the two founded a religious order that would be dedicated to helping them.

His beatification received approval in mid-2014 from Pope Francis after the pontiff approved a miracle that had been found to have been attributed to his intercession. Cardinal Angelo Amato beatified Cestac in mid-2015 on the pope's behalf.

== Life ==
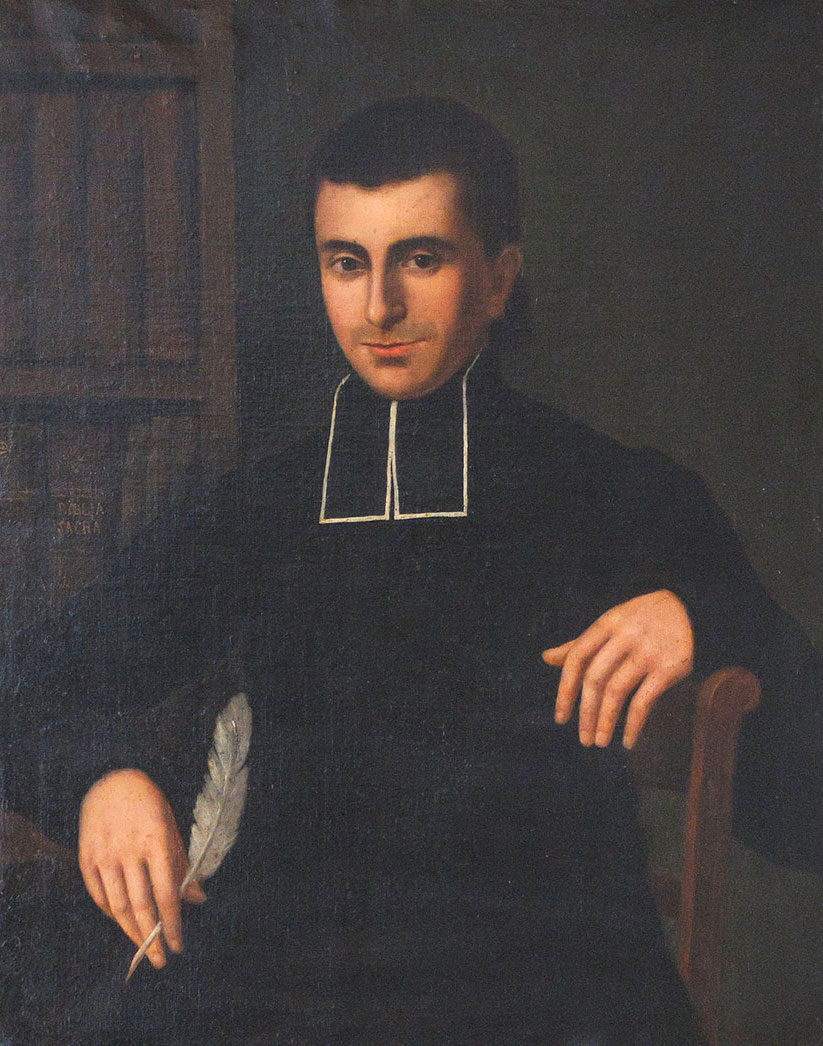
Younger Cestac.

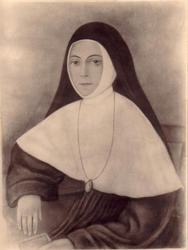
His sister and Servant of God Marie-Louise-Élise Cestac.

Louis-Édouard Cestac was born in 1801 in France to Dominique Cestac and Jeanne Amitessarobe at number 45 on the Rue Mayou; his siblings were Marianne and the Marie-Louise-Élise (14.03.1811-17.03.1849). His mother Jeanne was Basque-Spanish. Marianne (b. circa 1795) was the eldest while Élise was the last meaning Cestac was the middle sibling; he was Élise's godfather at her baptism.

In his childhood he suffered an incurable neuralgia and complete mutism for a duration of three years. His mother decided to consecrate him to the Mother of God and Cestac's condition improved to the point where he was healed. His healing was credited to the intercession of the Blessed Virgin. The Cestac's later moved to Puntous due to the Peninsular War.

Cestac underwent his ecclesial studies from 1816 at Aire-sur-l'Adour and Paris where he befriended Michel Garicoïts. He received the minor orders on 25 December 1821 and in 1822 was back to his studies and formation after recovering from a serious illness. He was ordained to the diaconate on 26 June 1825 before being ordained to the priesthood on 17 December 1825. He served as a professor in Larressore from 1826 until 1831. Father Cestac was later appointed as the vicar of the diocesan cathedral on 27 August 1831 and gave his full attention to the poor and met with them on a frequent basis in order to better serve them and to know them better. In 1836 he established a home for poor girls. He and his sister Marie-Louise Élise together co-founded - on 6 January 1842 - their own religious congregation known as the Serviteurs de Marie. Two other women joined at the time of the order's founding while Élise became Sister Marie Magdalene. There was once an occasion when Empress Eugénie de Montijo came to Cestac asking him to pray for her to have a son but the priest assured her that she would indeed bear a son - the empress did indeed have a son.

On 13 January 1864 a profound experience struck when a beam of light hit Cestac and caused him to see devils scattered across the globe causing grave damage. He was horrified but was relieved to see the Mother of God before him and who told him that those devils had been let loose. Yet she added that the time had come for the world to request her intercession to fight and end the grave powers of Hell. From her the priest received the prayer known as the "August Queen". He presented this to Bishop François Lacroix and also had 500, 000 copies printed to be sent. At the time of the first printing the printing press broke down twice.

His dedication to social and agricultural reform won him praise and it even earned him the Legion of Honor from Napoleon III in 1865 for his contributions to schooling and agriculture.

He died on 27 March 1868.

== Beatification ==
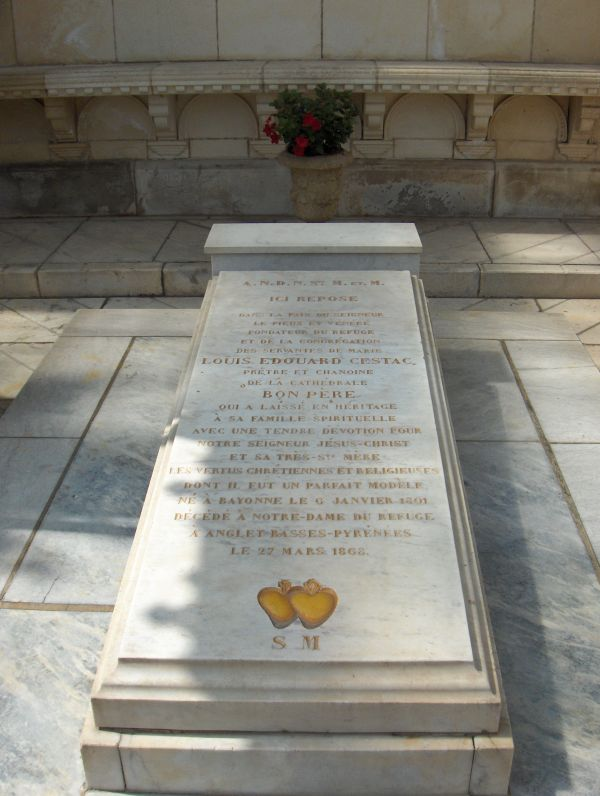
His tomb.

The process for beatification opened in France in a local informative process tasked with the collection of documents and such a process spanned for several months from February 1898 until 1899; theologians cleared his writings of doctrinal errors on 1 May 1902 in a move that would allow the cause to proceed. The formal introduction to the cause came under Pope Pius X on 8 April 1908 and he was titled as a Servant of God. An apostolic process was later held from 21 September 1909 until 28 February 1916 for further investigation. The cause then moved onwards to Rome where the Congregation for Rites validated these processes on 5 June 1919 deeming them to have done their work according to the required criteria.

An antepreparatory committee met to evaluate the cause on 28 March 1944 granting it their approval while the preparatory group had to meet twice on 13 February 1943 and 28 April 1953 in order to approve it. The officials of the Congregation for the Causes of Saints and their consultants also met and approved the cause on 13 April 1976 while the C.C.S. met alone to grant definitive approval on 22 June 1976. Pope Paul VI declared Cestac to have lived a life of heroic virtue and named him to be Venerable on 13 November 1976.

Cestac's beatification all depended on one healing deemed a miracle as a result of his intercession. One such case was investigated in a diocesan tribunal and was sent to the C.C.S. in Rome who validated the investigation on 28 January 2011. Medical experts deemed that there was no scientific explanation for the healing on 3 October 2013 while theologians ruled on 18 February 2014 that the healing came due to requests made for Cestac's intercession. The C.C.S. concurred with both findings on 3 June 2014. Pope Francis authorized the promulgation of a decree that recognized the healing as a legitimate miracle on 13 June 2014 which enabled the beatification to take place. Cardinal Angelo Amato presided over the beatification on 31 May 2015 on the pope's behalf.
