= Mariano Mullerat i Soldevila =

Spanish Roman Catholic doctor and mayor

Blessed Mariano Mullerat i Soldevila

Martyr
- Born: 24 March 1897; Santa Coloma de Queralt, Tarragona, Spain
- Died: 13 August 1936 (aged 39); El Pla, Arbeca, Lleida, Spain
- Venerated in: Roman Catholic Church
- Beatified: 23 March 2019, Tarragona, Spain by Cardinal Giovanni Angelo Becciu
- Feast: 13 August

Mariano Mullerat i Soldevila (24 March 1897 - 13 August 1936) was a Spanish Roman Catholic doctor who also served as the mayor for Arbeca from 1924 until March 1930. Mullerat studied medicine in Reus and Barcelona before he married in 1922 and settled with his wife in Arbeca where he pursued his private medical practice. He was a staunch Catholic traditionalist who defended Catholic dogma from liberalist interpretations and as a doctor provided free care for the poor and would even help them with their material needs. In his tenure as mayor he helped organize religious solemnities and was also known to pursue those who made blasphemous claims and slander in public.

The onset of Spanish Civil War in 1936 caused him concern since he attributed the rise of Francisco Franco as a bleak moment for Catholics across Spain. He knew over time his life would be targeted due to his strong Christian convictions as well as of those around him. He continued his practice until he was removed from his home and killed just three miles out from Arbeca.

The process for his beatification was initiated in Tarragona in 2003 and he became titled as a Servant of God. His beatification received approval on 7 November 2018 from Pope Francis who confirmed that he was killed "in odium fidei" (in hatred of the faith). The beatification was celebrated in Tarragona on 23 March 2019.

== Life ==
Mariano Mullerat i Soldevila was born in Santa Coloma de Queralt in Tarragona on 24 March 1897 as the sixth of seven children to the devout Ramón Mullerat i Segura and Bonaventura Soldevila i Calvis; he was baptized on 30 March then received Confirmation on 17 May. His mother died during his childhood. Three siblings included:

- Josep Mullerat i Soldevila (1888-1958) - served as the mayor for Tarragona from January to October 1923
- Joan Mullerat i Soldevila - served as a doctor in Santa Coloma de Queralt
- Ricard Mullerat i Soldevila - served as a construction businessman in Santa Coloma de Queralt

In 1910 he was sent to Reus for his education at the San Pedro Apóstol school that the Hijos de la Sagrada Familia managed. He later in 1914 began his studies at the college in Barcelona and during vacation periods would go out visiting other towns and also gave lectures to audiences on current sociopolitical issues. He earned a degree in medicine in October 1921 and soon after married Dolores Sans i Bové on 14 January 1922; the couple together had five daughters with one having died just after being born in January 1923. Following his marriage he settled in Arbeca where he managed a private practice he made available for all, as he was committed to the most disadvantaged people who could not afford proper medical care.

In 1923 he founded the Catalan language newspaper L'Escut which ran until 1926; it featured articles on sociopolitical issues and included poems. Prominent authors and journalists at times contributed to the articles printed in this paper.

Mullerat provided free medical care to the poor and would also help them with their material needs. He was a staunch Catholic traditionalist who resisted liberalist interpretations of Catholic dogma. He once had a debate with Dr. Fuset who denied the premise of the Immaculate Conception. This pained him but spurned him on to defend Catholic dogma when others sought to challenge it. He later served two consecutive terms as the mayor for Arbeca from 29 March 1924 until March 1930. During his term he cracked down on those who made blasphemous claims and slander and also assisted in organizing religious solemnities. His term was also marked with some urban and health initiatives to better Arbeca. In 1931 the Second Spanish Republic was proclaimed and he had reason for concern. Mullerat was aware of the seriousness coupled with the rise of Francisco Franco in 1936 and realized the dangers it posed to him and those around him. The anti-Catholic sentiment encroaching into Spanish live also had reason to cause him alarm as did the persecution of priests and religious sometime later just prior to and in the Spanish Civil War.

In the morning on 13 August 1936 came militiamen to his home who removed him and placed him into a truck alongside five others to be killed three miles outside of Arbeca. Before the truck reached its destination one mother approached asking in tears if Mullerat could be freed so he could treat her son who was ill at home in a serious condition. The truck stopped and Mullerat recognized the woman who told her: "Your son will not die". He wrote her a prescription for her son and handed it to her before the truck continued to El Pla outside of Arbeca. It was en route to their destination that he encouraged the four beside him to have courage and have faith in God asking that their executioners be forgiven. On 14 August a neighbor visited his wife to tell her of Mullerat's final words: "Father, into Your hands, I commend my spirit".

== Beatification ==
The beatification process for Mullerat commenced in the Tarragona archdiocese after the Congregation for the Causes of Saints issued the official "nihil obstat" (no objections) decree on 13 February 2003 and titled Mullerat as a Servant of God. The diocesan process was launched later on 9 July 2003 and was closed on 26 April 2004 before the contents of that investigation were sent to the C.C.S. in Rome for further evaluation; the C.C.S. validated the process on 9 November 2007 in a decree recognizing that the diocesan process adhered to the rules for causes.

Historical consultants met to discuss and approve the cause on 8 April 2014 in order to determine the historical circumstances surrounding Mullerat's death and the time in which he lived. Pope Francis confirmed Mullerat's beatification in a decree issued on 7 November 2018 upon determining that he was killed "in odium fidei" (in hatred of the faith) which meant he could be beatified without the need for a miracle attributed to his intercession being required. The beatification took place in the Tarragona Cathedral on 23 March 2019. The current postulator for this cause is the Dominican priest Gianni Festa.
