= Fidela Oller Angelats =

Spanish Roman Catholic religious sister and martyr

Blessed Fidela Oller Angelats RSJG
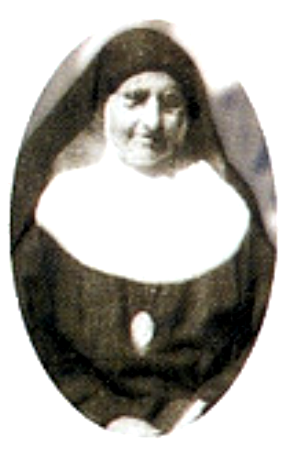

Virgin, martyr
- Born: Maria Dolors Oller Angelats; 17 September 1869; Bañolas, Girona, Spain
- Died: 30 August 1936 (aged 66); Xeresa, Valencia, Spain
- Venerated in: Catholic Church
- Beatified: 5 September 2015, Girona Cathedral, Spain by Cardinal Angelo Amato
- Feast: 30 August

Fidela Oller Angelats (born Maria Dolors Oller Angelats; 17 September 1869 – 30 August 1936) was a Spanish religious sister of the Hermanas de Sant Josep o Vetlladores (Sisters of Saint Joseph of Girona). She suffered martyrdom in the Spanish Civil War when she was gunned together along a road at Xeresa. On 5 September 2015, she was beatied in the Girona Cathedral.

== Life ==
Maria Dolors Oller Angelats was born on 17 September 1869 in Bañolas as the oldest of four children born to the potter Lorenzo Oller Verdaguer (1842–88) and Margarita Angelats Frigola. Her baptism was celebrated just moments after in the parish church of Santa María del Turers where she was baptized with the names Dolors Margarita Teresa. The Bishop of Girona Constantino Bonet conferred Confirmation upon her two months later that November. Her three brothers (in order) were Lorenzo (b. 1873), Teresa (male name; b. 1875) and Salvador (b. 1880). Her brother Salvador later became a Marist as Brother Doroteo. Her paternal grandfather (also a potter) was Lorenzo Oller Bartra.

From age seventeen she aspired to enter the religious life more than she had in her childhood and decided that she would become a professed religious herself. This stemmed from when she first encountered the Religious Sisters of Saint Joseph of Girona who came to her town on 14 July 1880 in order to help in the local hospital; she was exposed to them during this time and was attracted to their work. Oller made her first attempt to join the order not long following this resolution but was forced to leave for home after the sudden death of her father in 1888 (he died while tending to an ill relative). This return home prompted her to take care of her widowed mother and her brothers (Lorenzo aged fifteen, Teresa thirteen, and Salvador eight) in addition to her paternal grandfather who had moved in with them. But she soon after decided that her vocation was growing stronger and so returned to her order to continue with her formation under the novice mistress Sister María Vinardell. Oller returned to the order on 12 May 1892 to re-commence her novitiate and she assumed the religious name "Fidela" as a result. Oller made her initial profession on 17 November 1894 alongside two others (Inés Pagés Grivé (b. 1875) and Teresa Canal Vila (b. 1871)) and then made her solemn profession as a professed religious on 13 October 1902. Oller offered her services in the hospitals in order to care for the sick and was noted for her comforting presence to those who were ill.

In 1911 she was made the superior for the convent at Malgrat de Mar until August 1917 when she was moved to Camprodón. Oller later moved to Gandía in 1927 where she founded a new convent for her order and where she became its superior. It was here that she became known among her colleagues for her guidance and her supporting presence.

The outbreak of the Spanish Civil War in 1936 saw the local collegiate church in Gandía be burnt to the ground one month after the conflict started on 2 August. Oller was later told to turn over all funds and records to the militia despite the fact that she had sent them not long before this to the order's motherhouse located in another area. The nun later fled into hiding (and suffered sleepless nights knowing something could happen to her at some point) and was moving from place to place when she happened to come across a colleague: Sister Josefa Monrabal Montaner. The pair decided to move into a house after it was offered to them and lived in seclusion without ever leaving the home in order to avoid detection. But this all changed during the evening on 29 August when the pair were discovered and arrested. It was during that arrest that her arm was broken during the commotion. The head of the household José María Aparisi opened the door to militiamen demanding access to the nuns. He grew fearful that he too would be arrested so revealed their location. The men wanted Oller and not Monrabal though the latter demanded she not be separated from Oller.

Oller and Monrabal were shot several times and were left to bleed to death of their injuries overnight. Oller herself died from her injuries on 30 August along the road linking Gandía to Xeresa. Oller was shot in the shoulder and in the right temple while Monrabal died from a severe hemorrhage after being shot in the left side of her neck. People living in that area heard the shots and later in the morning discovered the corpses; the people buried them in Xeresa in the afternoon but the remains were exhumed in 1939 and returned to Gandía. Her remains were later exhumed and are now housed in Gandía.

== Beatification ==
The diocesan beatification process lasted from 24 November 2001 until 11 January 2003 the Congregation for the Causes of Saints declared that process valid in a decree issued on 28 March 2003.

The postulation soon after compiled the Positio dossier which would recount their lives and attesting to their killing in odium fidei ("in hatred of the faith"). The Positio was submitted in 2004 but no action was taken until almost a decade later on 10 December 2013 with theologians confirming the cause. Pope Francis confirmed her beatification on 23 January 2015; Cardinal Angelo Amato presided the celebration in the Girona Cathedral on 5 September 2015; the Bishop of Girona Francisco Pardo Artigas and the Cardinal Archbishop of Valencia Antonio Cañizares Llovera attended the beatification. Oller was beatified alongside her fellow religious Josefa Monrabal Montaner and Caterina Margenat Roura. Cardinal Amato - during the beatification Mass - noted that "even today, Christians are the most persecuted minority in the world". Pope Francis also hailed the trio in his Angelus remarks on 6 September 2015 and noted that "they were sisters of the Institute of Religious of Saint Joseph of Girona, killed for their fidelity to Christ and the Church". The pope further highlighted that the nuns were ever "trusting in God" who were recognized for "the shedding of their blood". The postulator for this cause is Sister Teresa Fernández Mielgo.
