= List of people beatified by Pope Pius X =

This is a list for the individuals that Pope Pius X (r. 1903–14) beatified throughout his pontificate; the pope beatified 131 in total.

No.	Blessed	Date of Beatification	Place of Beatification
1.	John of Vercelli	7 September 1903	Rome (equipollent beatification)
2.	Amadeus of Lausanne	9 December 1903	Rome (equipollent beatification)
3.	Arigius of Gap	9 December 1903	Rome (equipollent beatification)
4.	Hugh of Bonneavaux	9 December 1903	Rome (equipollent beatification)
5.	Leonianus of Autun	9 December 1903	Rome (equipollent beatification)
6.	Clarus of Vienne	9 December 1903	Rome (equipollent beatification)
7.	Gaspare Bufalo	29 August 1904	Saint Peter's Basilica, Kingdom of Italy
8.	Heldrade Novalese	9 December 1904	Rome (equipollent beatification)
9.	Stefano Bellesini	27 December 1904	Saint Peter's Basilica, Kingdom of Italy
10.	Agathange Noury	1 January 1905	Saint Peter's Basilica, Kingdom of Italy
11.	Cassian Vaz López-Neto	1 January 1905	Saint Peter's Basilica, Kingdom of Italy
12.	Jean-Baptiste-Marie Vianney	8 January 1905	Saint Peter's Basilica, Kingdom of Italy
13.	Stephen Pongracz	15 January 1905	Saint Peter's Basilica, Kingdom of Italy
14.	Melchiar Grodecký	15 January 1905	Saint Peter's Basilica, Kingdom of Italy
15.	Marko Križevčanin	15 January 1905	Saint Peter's Basilica, Kingdom of Italy
16.	Marco de' Marconi	2 March 1906	Rome (equipollent beatification)
17.	Julie Billiart	13 May 1906	Saint Peter's Basilica, Kingdom of Italy
18.	45 Vietnamese Martyrs	20 May 1906	Saint Peter's Basilica, Kingdom of Italy
19.	16 Carmelite Martyrs of Compiègne	27 May 1906	Saint Peter's Basilica, Kingdom of Italy
20.	Bonaventura Gran	10 June 1906	Saint Peter's Basilica, Kingdom of Italy
21.	Benedetto Ricasoli	14 May 1907	Rome (equipollent beatification)
22.	Zdislava Berka	28 August 1907	Rome (equipollent beatification)
23.	Maddalena Albrici	11 December 1907	Rome (equipollent beatification)
24.	Vivaldo of Gimignano	13 February 1908	Rome (equipollent beatification)
25.	Gerardo Cagnoli	13 May 1908	Rome (equipollent beatification)
26.	Marie-Madeleine Postel	17 May 1908	Saint Peter's Basilica, Kingdom of Italy
27.	Madeleine Sophie Barat	24 May 1908	Saint Peter's Basilica, Kingdom of Italy
28.	Gabriel of Our Lady of Sorrows	31 May 1908	Saint Peter's Basilica, Kingdom of Italy
29.	Christina von Stommeln	12 August 1908	Rome (equipollent beatification)
30.	John van Ruysbroeck	1 December 1908	Saint Peter's Basilica, Kingdom of Italy
31.	Bartolomeo Fanti	18 March 1909	Rome (equipollent beatification)
32.	Joan of Arc	18 April 1909	Saint Peter's Basilica, Kingdom of Italy
33.	Jean Eudes	25 April 1909	Saint Peter's Basilica, Kingdom of Italy
34.	33 Chinese Martyrs	2 May 1909	Saint Peter's Basilica, Kingdom of Italy
35.	Friedrich of Regensburg	12 May 1909	Rome (equipollent beatification)
36.	Gamelbert of Michaelsbuch	25 August 1909	Rome (equipollent beatification)
37.	Utto of Metten	25 August 1909	Rome (equipollent beatification)
38.	Julian Cesarello de Valle	23 February 1910	Rome (equipollent beatification)
39.	Giacomo da Viterbo	14 June 1911	Rome (equipollent beatification)
40.	Bonaventura Tornielli	6 September 1911	Rome (equipollent beatification)

== See also ==
- List of people beatified by Pope Benedict XV
- List of people beatified by Pope Pius XI
- List of people beatified by Pope Pius XII
- List of people beatified by Pope John XXIII
- List of people beatified by Pope Paul VI
- List of people beatified by Pope John Paul II
- List of people beatified by Pope Benedict XVI
- List of people beatified by Pope Francis
- List of people beatified by Pope Leo XIV
