= List of people beatified by Pope Leo XIV =

This article contains a list of individuals and group of martyrs scheduled to be beatified by Pope Leo XIV during his pontificate.

== 2025 ==
Blessed				Date of beatification and presider	Place of beatification	Ref.
No.	Details	Church status	Competent Forum	Date of beatification and presider	Place of beatification	Ref.
May
1.	Camille Costa de Beauregard (1841–1910)	Diocesan priest	Chambéry	17 May 2025 by Archbishop Celestino Migliore	Cathedral of Saint-François-de-Sales, Chambery, France	
2.	Stanisław Kostka Streich (1902–1938)	Diocesan priest	Poznań	24 May 2025 by Cardinal Marcello Semeraro	Square of Archcathedral Basilica of St. Peter and St. Paul, Poznań, Poland	
3.	Maria Krzysztofa Klomfass and companions (died 1945)	Religious of the Sisters of Saint Catherine, Virgin and martyr	Warmia	31 May 2025 by Cardinal Marcello Semeraro	City Amphitheater of Henryk Mroziński, Braniewo, Poland	
June
4.	Floribert Bwana Chui (1981–2007)	Layman, member of the Community of Sant'Egidio	Goma	15 June 2025 by Cardinal Marcello Semeraro	Basilica of Saint Paul Outside the Walls, Rome, Italy	
July
5.	Lycarion May (1870–1909)	Marist Brother	Barcelona	12 July 2025 by Cardinal Marcello Semeraro	Church of Sant Francesc de Sales, Barcelona, Spain	
September
6.	Mária Magdolna Bódi (1921–1945)	Laywoman	Veszprém	6 September 2025 by Cardinal Péter Erdő	Veszprém Aréna Sport- és Rendezvénycsarnok, Veszprém, Hungary	
7.	Eduard Gottlieb Profittlich (1890–1942)	Jesuit; Apostolic Administrator of Estonia; Titular Archbishop of Hadrianopolis in Haemimonto	Tallinn	6 September 2025 by Cardinal Christoph Schönborn, O.P.	Vabaduse Väljak, Tallinn, Estonia	
8.	Petro Pavlo Oros (1917–1953)	Diocesan priest	Mukachevo of the Ruthenians	27 September 2025 by Cardinal Grzegorz Ryś	Church of the Assumption of the Blessed Virgin Mary, Bilky, Ukraine	
November
9.	Eliswa Vakayil (rel. name: Eliswa of the Blessed Sacrament) (1831–1913)	Founder of the Congregation of the Third Order of Discalced Carmelite Sisters	Verapoly	8 November 2025 by Cardinal Sebastian Francis	Basilica of Our Lady of Ransom, Verapoly, India	
10.	Carmine De Palma (1876–1961)	Diocesan priest	Bari-Bitonto	15 November 2025 by Cardinal Marcello Semeraro	Saint Nicholas, Bari, Italy	
December
11.	Manuel Izquerido Izquerido and companions (Died between 1936 and 1938)	Martyrs; diocesan clergy, members of the consecrated life, and lay faithful	Jaén	13 December 2025 by Cardinal Marcello Semeraro	Cathedral of La Asunción, Jaén, Spain	
12.	Raymond Cayre and companions (died between 1944 and 1945)	Martyrs; diocesan clergy, members of the consecrated life, and lay faithful	Paris	13 December 2025 by Cardinal Jean-Claude Hollerich	Cathedral of Notre Dame, Paris, France	

== 2026 ==
Blessed				Date of Beatification and Presider	Place of Beatification	Ref.
No.	Details	Church status	Competent Forum	Date of Beatification and Presider	Place of Beatification	Ref.
February
13.	Salvador Valera Parra (1816–1889)	Diocesan priest	Almeria	7 February 2026 by Cardinal Marcello Semeraro	Espacio de Usos Múltiples, Huércal-Overa, Spain	
14.	Gilbert Nicolas (rel. name: Gabriel Maria) (c. 1462–1532)	Franciscan friar; cofounder of the Order of the Annunciation of the Virgin Mary	Créteil/Agen	21 February 2026 by Pope Leo XIV (Equipollent Beatification)	Vatican City	
June
15.	Jan Świerc and companions (died between 1941 and 1942)	Martyrs; Salesians of Don Bosco	Kraków	6 June 2026 by Cardinal Marcello Semeraro	Sanktuarium św. Jana Pawła II, Kraków, Poland	
16.	Václav Drbola (1912–1951)	Diocesan priests	Brno	6 June 2026 by Cardinal Michael Czerny	Brněnské Výstaviště, Brno, Czech Republic	
17.	Jan Bula (1920–1952)	Diocesan priests	Brno	6 June 2026 by Cardinal Michael Czerny	Brněnské Výstaviště, Brno, Czech Republic	
18.	Nazareno Lanciotti (1940–2001)	Diocesan priest; Fidei Donum missionary in São Luiz de Cáceres; Member, Marian Movement of Priests	São Luíz de Cáceres	13 June 2026 by Cardinal João Braz de Aviz	Jauru, Mato Grosso, Brazil	
July
19.	Francis Xavier Trương Bửu Diệp (1897–1946)	Diocesan priest and martyr	Cần Thơ	2 July 2026 by Cardinal Luis Antonio Tagle	Tắc Sậy Church, Giá Rai, Vietnam	
20.	Elyās Buțros Al-Ḩwayek (1843–1931)	patriarch of Antioch of the Maronites; founder, Maronite Sisters of the Holy Family	Batroun of the Maronites	25 July 2026 by Cardinal Marcello Semeraro	Summer Patriarchal Residence, Dimane, Lebanon	
September
21.	Fulton J. Sheen (1895–1979)	Bishop of Rochester; titular archbishop of Newport	Peoria	24 September 2026 by Cardinal Luis Antonio Tagle	The Dome at America’s Center, St. Louis, Missouri, United States	
22.	Elia Comini (1910–1944)	Salesian	Bologna	27 September 2026 by Cardinal Marcello Semeraro	Basilica of San Petronio, Bologna, Bologna, Italy	
23.	Ubaldo Marchioni (1918–1944)	priest of the archdiocese of Bologna	Bologna	27 September 2026 by Cardinal Marcello Semeraro	Basilica of San Petronio, Bologna, Bologna, Italy	
24.	Martino Capelli (1912–1944)	Dehonian	Bologna	27 September 2026 by Cardinal Marcello Semeraro	Basilica of San Petronio, Bologna, Bologna, Italy	
October
25.	Maria Ignacja Isacchi (1857–1934)	founder of the Ursuline Sisters of the Sacred Heart of Jesus of Asola	Bergamo	10 October 2026 by Cardinal Marcello Semeraro	Cathedral of San Pietro Apostolo, Mantova, Italy	
26.	Joan Torres Torres and companions (died between August and September 1936)	diocesan priests, members of the consecrated life, seminarians and lay faithful	Ibiza	17 October 2026 by Cardinal Marcello Semeraro	Cathedral of La Verge de les Neus, Ibiza, Spain	
27.	Pedro de Corpa and companions (died 1597)	Franciscan friars	Savannah	31 October 2026 by Cardinal Frank Leo	Savannah Convention Center, Savannah, Georgia, United States	
November
28.	Augusto Rafael Ramírez Monasterio (1937–1983)	Franciscan friar	Guatemala	7 November 2026 by Cardinal Francisco Robles Ortega	Finca Municipal Florencia, Santa Lucía Milpas Altas, Guatemala	
29.	Francisco González de Córdova and companions (died between 1936 and 1937)	diocesan priests, members of the consecrated life, seminarians and lay faithful	Santander	7 November 2026 by Cardinal Marcello Semeraro	Cathedral of Nuestra Señora de la Asunción, Santander, Spain	
30.	Ignacio Aláez Vaquero and companions (Died between 1936 and 1937)	Martyrs; diocesan priests, seminarians, and lay faithful	Madrid	28 November 2026 by Cardinal Marcello Semeraro	Cathedral of La Almudena, Madrid, Spain	

== Date to be determined ==
Blessed				Date of Beatification	Place of Beatification	Ref.
No.	Details	Church status	Competent Forum	Date of Beatification	Place of Beatification	Ref.
1.	Enrique Ernesto Shaw (1921–1962)	Layman	Buenos Aires	---	---	
2.	Sélim Abū Mrād (rel. name: Bshārah) (1853–1930)	Monk, Basilian Salvatorian Order	Saïda of the Melkites	---	---	
3.	Estanislao Ortega García and companions (died between July and November 1936)	religious priest of the Montfort Brothers of Saint Gabriel	Barcelona	---	---	
4.	Rosella Stàltari (1951–1974)	professed religious of the Congregation of the Daughters of Mary Coredemptrix	Locri-Gerace	---	---	
5.	José Gómez Llor and companions (died between March 1936 and March 1939)	priest and professed religious, Brothers of Saint Gabriel	Cartagena	---	---	

== See also ==
- List of people beatified by Pope Pius X
- List of people beatified by Pope Benedict XV
- List of people beatified by Pope Pius XI
- List of people beatified by Pope Pius XII
- List of people beatified by Pope John XXIII
- List of people beatified by Pope Paul VI
- List of people beatified by Pope John Paul II
- List of people beatified by Pope Benedict XVI
- List of people beatified by Pope Francis
