= List of people beatified by Pope Benedict XV =

This is a list for all the individuals that Pope Benedict XV (r. 1914–22) beatified throughout his pontificate; the pope beatified 46 individuals in total.

| No. | Blessed | Date of Beatification | Place of Beatification |
|---|---|---|---|
| 1. | Giuseppe Benedetto Cottolengo | 29 April 1917 | Saint Peter's Basilica, Kingdom of Italy |
| 2. | Anne of Saint Bartholomew | 6 May 1917 | Saint Peter's Basilica, Kingdom of Italy |
| 3. | Nuno Álvares Pereira | 23 January 1918 | Rome (equipollent beatification) |
| 4. | Giovanni Pelingotto | 13 November 1918 | Rome (equipollent beatification) |
| 5. | Isnardo da Chiampo | 12 March 1919 | Rome (equipollent beatification) |
| 6. | Ugolino da Gualdo Cattaneo | 12 March 1919 | Rome (equipollent beatification) |
| 7. | Louise de Marillac | 9 May 1920 | Saint Peter's Basilica, Kingdom of Italy |
| 8. | Oliver Plunkett | 21 May 1920 | Saint Peter's Basilica, Kingdom of Italy |
| 9. | Anna Maria Taigi | 30 May 1920 | Saint Peter's Basilica, Kingdom of Italy |
| 10. | Charles Lwanga & 21 Companions | 6 June 1920 | Saint Peter's Basilica, Kingdom of Italy |
| 11. | Marie-Madeleine Fontaine & 3 Companions | 13 June 1920 | Saint Peter's Basilica, Kingdom of Italy |
| 12. | 11 Ursuline Martyrs of Valenciennes | 13 June 1920 | Saint Peter's Basilica, Kingdom of Italy |
| 13. | Domenico Spadafora | 14 January 1921. | Rome (equipollent beatification) |
| 14. | Margaret of Lorraine | 10 March 1921 | Rome (equipollent beatification) |
| 15. | Angelo Scarpetti | 27 July 1921 | Saint Peter's Basilica, Kingdom of Italy |
| 16. | Andrea Franchi | 21 November 1921 | Rome (equipollent beatification) |

== See also ==
- List of people beatified by Pope Pius X
- List of people beatified by Pope Pius XI
- List of people beatified by Pope Pius XII
- List of people beatified by Pope John XXIII
- List of people beatified by Pope Paul VI
- List of people beatified by Pope John Paul II
- List of people beatified by Pope Benedict XVI
- List of people beatified by Pope Francis
- List of people beatified by Pope Leo XIV
