= List of people beatified by Pope Pius XI =

This is a list for all the individuals that Pope Pius XI (r. 1922–39) beatified throughout his pontificate; the pope beatified 511 individuals in total.

No.	Blessed	Date of Beatification	Place of Beatification
1.	Lorenzo da Villamagna	28 February 1923	Rome (equipollent beatification)
2.	Thérèse of Lisieux	29 April 1923	Saint Peter's Basilica, Kingdom of Italy
3.	Michel Garicoïts	10 May 1923	Saint Peter's Basilica, Kingdom of Italy
4.	Roberto Bellarmino	13 May 1923	Saint Peter's Basilica, Kingdom of Italy
5.	Antonio Maria Gianelli	19 April 1925	Saint Peter's Basilica, Kingdom of Italy
6.	Vincenzo Strambi	26 April 1925	Saint Peter's Basilica, Kingdom of Italy
7.	Giuseppe Cafasso	3 May 1925	Saint Peter's Basilica, Kingdom of Italy
8.	32 Ursuline Martyrs of Orange	10 May 1925	Saint Peter's Basilica, Kingdom of Italy
9.	Bogumilus	27 May 1925	Rome (equipollent beatification)
10.	12 Martyrs of North Korea	6 June 1925	Saint Peter's Basilica, Kingdom of Italy
11.	Maria Micaela Desmaisieres	7 June 1925	Saint Peter's Basilica, Kingdom of Italy
12.	Bernadette Soubirous	14 June 1925	Saint Peter's Basilica, Kingdom of Italy
13.	8 Martyrs of North America	21 June 1925	Saint Peter's Basilica, Kingdom of Italy
14.	9 Martyrs of the Small West Gate	5 July 1925	Saint Peter's Basilica, Kingdom of Italy
15.	15 Martyrs of Seoul	5 July 1925	Saint Peter's Basilica, Kingdom of Italy
16.	Peter Julian Eymard	12 July 1925	Saint Peter's Basilica, Kingdom of Italy
17.	André-Hubert Fournet	16 May 1926	Saint Peter's Basilica, Kingdom of Italy
18.	Jeanne-Antide Thouret	23 May 1926	Saint Peter's Basilica, Kingdom of Italy
19.	Bartolomea Capitanio	30 May 1926	Saint Peter's Basilica, Kingdom of Italy
20.	Vincenza Gerosa	30 May 1926	Saint Peter's Basilica, Kingdom of Italy
21.	Lucy Filippini	13 June 1926	Saint Peter's Basilica, Kingdom of Italy
22.	Beatrice of Silva	28 July 1926	Rome (equipollent beatification)
23.	Ghébrē-Michael	3 October 1926	Saint Peter's Basilica, Kingdom of Italy
24.	Manuel Ruiz López & 10 Companions	10 October 1926	Saint Peter's Basilica, Kingdom of Italy
25.	Jean Marie du Lau d'Allemans & 190 Companions	17 October 1926	Saint Peter's Basilica, Kingdom of Italy
26.	Salomon Leclercq	17 October 1926	Saint Peter's Basilica, Kingdom of Italy
27.	Noël Pinot	31 October 1926	Saint Peter's Basilica, Kingdom of Italy
28.	Stilla von Abenberg	12 January 1927	Rome (equipollent beatification)
29.	Luca Belludi	18 May 1927	Rome (equipollent beatification)
30.	Hugues de Fosses	13 July 1927	Rome (equipollent beatification)
31.	Ozana Kotorska	21 December 1927	Rome (equipollent beatification)
32.	Falco of Cava	16 May 1928	Rome (equipollent beatification)
33.	Leo II of Cava	16 May 1928	Rome (equipollent beatification)
34.	Leonard of Cava	16 May 1928	Rome (equipollent beatification)
35.	Marino of Cava	16 May 1928	Rome (equipollent beatification)
36.	Peter II of Cava	16 May 1928	Rome (equipollent beatification)
37.	Simeon of Cava	16 May 1928	Rome (equipollent beatification)
38.	Balsamus of Cava	16 May 1928	Rome (equipollent beatification)
39.	Benincasa of Cava	16 May 1928	Rome (equipollent beatification)
40.	Giovanni Bosco	2 June 1929	Saint Peter's Basilica, Vatican City
41.	Teresa Margaret of the Sacred Heart	9 June 1929	Saint Peter's Basilica, Vatican City
42.	Claude de la Colombiere	16 June 1929	Saint Peter's Basilica, Vatican City
43.	Gomidas Keumurdjian	23 June 1929	Saint Peter's Basilica, Vatican City
44.	Francesco Maria da Camporosso	30 June 1929	Saint Peter's Basilica, Vatican City
45.	Irmgard of Chiemsee	17 July 1929	Saint Peter's Basilica, Vatican City
46.	136 Martyrs of England	15 December 1929	Saint Peter's Basilica, Vatican City
47.	John Ogilvie	22 December 1929	Saint Peter's Basilica, Vatican City
48.	Baldassare Ravaschieri	8 January 1930	Vatican City (equipollent beatification)
49.	Paula Frassinetti	8 June 1930	Saint Peter's Basilica, Vatican City
50.	Conrad of Parzham	15 June 1930	Saint Peter's Basilica, Vatican City
51.	Mary Euphrasia Pelletier	30 April 1933	Saint Peter's Basilica, Vatican City
52.	Gemma Galgani	14 May 1933	Saint Peter's Basilica, Vatican City
53.	Giuseppe Pignatelli	21 May 1933	Saint Peter's Basilica, Vatican City
54.	Catherine Labouré	28 May 1933	Saint Peter's Basilica, Vatican City
55.	Roque González y de Santa Cruz & 2 Companions	28 January 1934	Saint Peter's Basilica, Vatican City
56.	Antonio María Claret	25 February 1934	Saint Peter's Basilica, Vatican City
57.	Pierre-René Rogue	10 May 1934	Saint Peter's Basilica, Vatican City
58.	Joan Elizabeth Bichier des Âges	13 May 1934	Saint Peter's Basilica, Vatican City
59.	Maria Giuseppa Rossello	6 November 1938	Saint Peter's Basilica, Vatican City
60.	Frances Xavier Cabrini	13 November 1938	Saint Peter's Basilica, Vatican City
61.	Maria Mazzarello	20 November 1938	Saint Peter's Basilica, Vatican City

== See also ==
- List of people beatified by Pope Pius XII
- List of people beatified by Pope John XXIII
- List of people beatified by Pope Paul VI
- List of people beatified by Pope John Paul II
- List of people beatified by Pope Benedict XVI
- List of people beatified by Pope Francis
- List of people beatified by Pope Leo XIV
