= Blessed Antonia =

Blessed Antonia may refer to:

- Antonia of Florence (1401-1472), Franciscan
- Antonia of Brescia (1407-1507), Dominican
- María Antonia de Paz y Figueroa (1730-1799), Daughters of the Divine Savior
- Antonia Maria Verna (1773-1838), Institute of Sisters of Mercy of the Immaculate Conception
- María Antonia Bandrés Elósegui (1898-1919), Daughters of Jesus
- Antonia Mesina (1919-1935), martyr
- Antonia Riba Mestres (1893-1936), also known as Sister Climenta of Saint John the Baptist, one of the martyrs of El Saler in the Spanish Civil War
