= María López de Rivas Martínez =

Spanish Discalced Carmelite

Blessed María of Jesus OCD
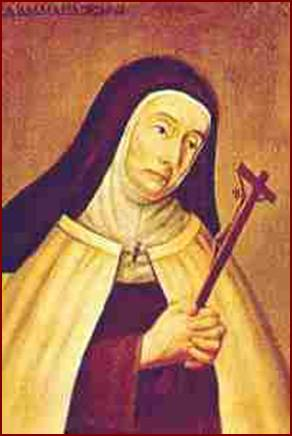

Virgin
- Born: María López de Rivas Martínez; 18 August 1560; Tartanedo, Guadalajara, Spain
- Died: 13 September 1640 (aged 80); Toledo, Spain
- Venerated in: Roman Catholic Church
- Beatified: 14 November 1976, Saint Peter's Square by Pope Paul VI
- Feast: 13 September

María López de Rivas Martínez, OCD (18 August 1560 – 13 September 1640), in religion María of Jesus, was a Spanish Discalced Carmelite. She was beatified on 14 November 1976.

== Life ==
María López de Rivas Martinez was born in Spain on 18 August 1560 into a life of wealth. Her father died when she was four and her paternal grandparents raised her after her mother remarried. She was well educated and favored a simple life rather than one of wealth.

She was introduced to a Jesuit priest on 12 August 1577 and took this as a chance to become a member of the Carmelites at Toledo at the age of seventeen despite her precarious state of health. She was professed as a full member of the order on 8 September 1578. She also was said to have borne the stigmata. She served as prioress of the institution from 1591 to 1595 and in 1598. She was accused of an offence in 1600 - an unjust accusation - and was removed as the prioress and was isolated for two decades. She accepted this without resentment and, after the accuser had died, she was rehabilitated while asking for forgiveness. She was re-elected as prioress on 25 June 1624 and served until 1627.

She was also a close friend to Teresa of Avila and the two confided in each other.

Her health continued to decline and she died on 13 September 1640 at 10:00am.

== Beatification ==
The beatification process commenced in Toledo on 10 December 1926 and it conferred the title of Servant of God upon her. She was declared to be Venerable on 22 June 1972 after Pope Paul VI recognized her life of heroic virtue.

Two miracles were required for her beatification. The process for the first opened in Cartagena and spanned from 1928 to 1929. The second was held at exactly the same time in Toledo. Both processes were ratified in 1974. Paul VI approved both in mid 1976 and beatified her on 14 November 1976.

The third miracle attributed to her intercession needed for her canonization was investigated and the process was ratified on 13 October 1995. The medical board that advises the Congregation for the Causes of Saints in Rome approved the miracle in mid 1998.
