= Nazareno Lanciotti =

Italian Roman Catholic priest

Blessed Nazareno Lanciotti
- Born: March 3, 1940; Rome, Kingdom of Italy
- Died: February 22, 2001 (aged 60); São Paulo, Brazil
- Beatified: 13 June 2026, Jauru, Mato Grosso, Brazil
- Feast: 12 January

Nazareno Lanciotti (3 March 1940, Rome – 22 February 2001, São Paulo) was an Italian Roman Catholic priest and member of the Marian Movement of Priests who served in Mato Grosso, Brazil, where he was murdered. The Catholic Church venerates him as a martyr.

== Biography ==
Nazareno Lanciotti was born in Rome on March 3, 1940. Ordained a priest in 1966, he remained in Rome only briefly. After years of formation in Subiaco and initial pastoral experience in a few Roman parishes, he moved to Brazil as a missionary at the end of 1971. On January 12, 1972, he began his ministry in Jauru, at that time one of the poorest communities in Mato Grosso, where he founded the Parish of Our Lady of the Pillar, established 57 rural ecclesial communities, and set up a charitable institution focused on medical care for the poorest, while also devoting himself to work with drug addicts and prostitutes. In 1987, he joined the Marian Movement of Priests and was later appointed its national director.

His pastoral activities caused him to suffer death threats from criminal groups. On the night of February 11, 2001, inside his residence, while finishing dinner with some collaborators, two hooded men entered his home and one of them shot him in the back of the neck. According to reports, the man who shot him had said: "I am the demon... I came to kill you because you bother us too much." The bullet hit the priest's fourth vertebra, and he was still flown to Cuiabá and then to São Paulo. Father Lanciotti died on February 22, after having forgiven his assassins.

== Veneration ==
On April 14, 2025, Pope Francis authorized the promulgation of the decrees concerning the beatification of the Italian priest and martyr Nazareno Lanciotti. Father Lanciotti was beatified on June 13, 2026, in a ceremony celebrated by Cardinal João Braz de Aviz.
