= List of people beatified by Pope Benedict XVI =

Pope Benedict XVI beatified 870 people. The names listed below are from the Vatican website and are listed by year, then date. The locations given are the locations of the beatification ceremonies, not necessarily the birthplaces or homelands of the beatified.

== 2005 ==
=== 14 May 2005, Saint Peter's Basilica, Vatican City ===
- Marianne Cope (1838–1918) (canonized on 21 October 2012)
- Ascensión Nicol Goñi (1868–1940)

=== 19 June 2005, Warsaw, Poland ===
- Władysław Findysz (1866–1931)
- Ignacy Kłopotowski (1907–1964)
- Bronisław Markiewicz (1842–1912)

=== 9 October 2005, Saint Peter's Basilica, Vatican City ===
- Clemens August Graf von Galen (1878–1946)

=== 29 October 2005, Saint Peter's Basilica, Vatican City ===
- Ángela Ginard Martí (1894–1936)
- Joseph Tàpies Sirvant and companions (+1936)

=== 6 November 2005, Vicenza, Italy ===
- Eurosia Fabris (1866–1932)

=== 13 November 2005, Saint Peter's Basilica, Vatican City ===
- Charles de Foucauld (1858–1916) (canonized on 15 May 2022)
- Maria Crocifissa Curcio (1877–1957)
- Maria Pia Mastena (1881–1951)

=== 20 November 2005, Guadalajara, Jalisco, Mexico ===
- Anacleto González Flores and companions (+1927)
- José Trinidad Rangel Montaño and companions (+1927)
- José Sánchez del Río (1913–1928) (canonized on 16 October 2016)
- Darío Acosta Zurita (1908–1931)

== 2006 ==
=== 18 March 2006, Bari, Italy ===
- Teodora Fracasso (1901–1927)

=== 30 April 2006 ===
==== Milan, Italy ====
- Luigi Biraghi (1801–1879)
- Luigi Monza (1898–1954)

==== Ramapuram, Kerala, India ====
- Thevarparampil Kunjachan (1891–1973)

=== 13 May 2006, Roermond, Limburg, Netherlands ===
- Maria Teresa of St. Joseph (1855–1938)

=== 14 May 2006, Naples, Italy ===
- Maria Grazia Tarallo (1866–1912)

=== 28 May 2006, Viseu, Portugal ===
- Rita Lopes de Almeida (1848–1913)

=== 15 June 2006, Belo Horizonte, Brazil ===
- Eustáquio van Lieshout (1890–1943)

=== 17 September 2006 ===
==== Brescia, Italy ====
- Mosè Tovini (1877–1930)

==== Budapest, Hungary ====
- Sára Salkaházi (1899–1944)

=== 8 October 2006, Fiesole, Italy ===
- Maria Scrilli (1825–1889)

=== 22 October 2006 ===
==== Bilbao, Spain ====
- María Pilar López de Maturana Ortiz de Zárate (1884–1934)

==== Speyer, Germany ====
- Paul Joseph Nardini (1821–1862)

=== 5 November 2006, São Paulo, Brazil ===
- Mariano de la Mata (1905–1983)

=== 3 December 2006, Kerala, India ===
- Euphrasia Eluvathingal (1877–1952) (canonized on 23 November 2014)

== 2007 ==
=== 14 April 2007, Turin, Italy ===
- Luigi Boccardo (1861–1936)

=== 15 April 2007, Naples, Italy ===
- Costanza Starace (1845–1921)

=== 21 April 2007, Palermo, Sicily, Italy ===
- Francesco Spoto (1924–1964)

=== 29 April 2007, Rimini, Italy ===
- Bruna Pellesi (1917–1972)

=== 6 May 2007, Málaga, Spain ===
- María del Carmen González-Ramos García-Prieto de Muñoz (1834–1899)

=== 27 May 2007, Città di Castello, Italy ===
- Carlo Liviero (1866–1932)

=== 15 September 2007, Le Mans, France ===
- Basile Moreau (1799–1873)

=== 16 September 2007 ===
==== Bordeaux, Gironde, France ====
- Jeanne-Germaine Castang (1878–1897)

==== Licheń Stary, Poland ====
- Stanislaus Papczyński (1631–1701) (canonized on 5 June 2016)

=== 30 September 2007, Nysa, Poland ===
- Maria Merkert (1817–1872)

=== 20 October 2007, Tubarão, Brazil ===
- Albertina Berkenbrock (1919–1931)

=== 21 October 2007, Frederico Westphalen, Brazil ===
- Manuel Gómez González (1877–1924)
- Adílio Daronch (1908–1924)

=== 26 October 2007, Linz, Austria ===
- Franz Jägerstätter (1907–1943)

=== 27 October 2007, Rome, Italy ===
- Celine Borzecka (1833–1913)

=== 28 October 2007, Saint Peter's Square, Vatican City ===
- 498 Spanish Martyrs (+1934, 1936–1937)

=== 11 November 2007, Chimpay, Río Negro, Argentina ===
- Ceferino Namuncurá (1886–1905)

=== 18 November 2007, Novara, Italy ===
- Antonio Rosmini (1797–1855)

=== 2 December 2007, Salvador, Bahia, Brazil ===
- Lindalva Justo de Oliveira (1953–1993)

== 2008 ==
=== 3 February 2008, Cagliari, Italy ===
- Giuseppina Nicoli (1863–1924)

=== 30 March 2008, Florence, Italy ===
- Maria Anna Donati (1848–1925)

=== 27 April 2008, Caracas, Venezuela ===
- Candlemas of San José (1863–1940)

=== 3 May 2008, Rome, Italy ===
- Caterina Sordini (1770–1824)

=== 4 May 2008, Trier, Germany ===
- Margaretha Flesch (1826–1906)

=== 24 May 2008, Lviv, Ukraine ===
- Marta Anna Wiecka (1874–1904)

=== 1 June 2008, Naples, Italy ===
- Giuseppina Catanea (1894–1948)

=== 22 June 2008, Beirut, Lebanon ===
- Khalīl al-Haddād (1875–1954)

=== 29 June 2008, Limburg, Netherlands ===
- Josefa Stenmanns (1852–1903)

=== 21 September 2008, Verona, Italy ===
- Vincenza Maria Poloni (1802–1855) (canonized on 19 October 2025)

=== 28 September 2008, Białystok, Poland ===
- Michael Sopocko (1888–1975)

=== 4 October 2008 ===
==== Trieste, Italy ====
- Francesco Bonifacio (1912–1946)

==== Vigevano, Pavia, Italy ====
- Francesco Pianzola (1881–1943)

=== 19 October 2008, Lisieux, France ===
- Louis Martin (1823–1894) (canonized on 18 October 2015)
- Marie-Azélie Guérin Martin (1831–1877) (canonized on 18 October 2015)

=== 24 November 2008, Nagasaki, Japan ===
- Petrus Kibe Kasui and companions (+1603–1639)

=== 29 November 2008, Camagüey, Cuba ===
- José Olallo Valdés (1820–1889)

== 2009 ==
=== 7 June 2009, Antananarivo, Madagascar ===
- Raphaël Rafiringa (1856–1919)

=== 5 July 2009, Castres, France ===
- Émilie de Villeneuve (1811–1854) (canonized on 17 May 2015)

=== 4 October 2009, Regensburg, Germany ===
- Eustachius Kugler (1867–1946)

=== 18 October 2009, Toledo, Spain ===
- Ciriaco María Sancha y Hervás (1833–1909)

=== 25 October 2009, Milan, Italy ===
- Carlo Gnocchi (1902–1956)

=== 31 October 2009, Budapest, Hungary ===
- Zoltán Meszlényi (1892–1951)

=== 22 November 2009, Nazareth, Israel ===
- Marie-Alphonsine Danil Ghattas (1843–1927) (canonized on 17 May 2015)

== 2010 ==
=== 23 January 2010, Barcelona, Spain ===
- Josep Samsó Elías (1887–1936)

=== 18 April 2010, Valladolid, Spain ===
- Bernardo de Hoyos (1711–1735)

=== 25 April 2010 ===
==== Rome, Italy ====
- Angelo Paoli (1642–1720)

==== Barcelona, Spain ====
- Josep Tous Soler (1811–1871)

=== 22 May 2010, Benevento, Italy ===
- Teresa Manganiello (1849–1876)

=== 30 May 2010, Rome, Italy ===
- Maria Pierina (1890–1945)

=== 6 June 2010, Warsaw, Poland ===
- Jerzy Popiełuszko (1947–1984)

=== 12 June 2010, Linares, Jaén, Spain ===
- Manuel Lozano Garrido (1920–1971)

=== 13 June 2010, Celje, Slovenia ===
- Lojze Grozde (1923–1943)

=== 27 June 2010, Kfifan, Lebanon ===
- Stephen Nehmé (1889–1938)

=== 12 September 2010, Armilla, Spain ===
- Leopold of Alpandeire (1864–1956)

=== 18 September 2010, Seville, Spain ===
- María de la Purísima Salvat Romero (1926–1998) (canonized on 18 October 2015)

=== 19 September 2010 ===
==== Birmingham, England ====
- John Henry Newman (1801–1890) (canonized on 13 October 2019)

==== Münster, Germany ====
- Gerhard Hirschfelder (1907–1942)

=== 25 September 2010, Rome, Italy ===
- Chiara Badano (1971–1990)

=== 3 October 2010, Parma, Italy ===
- Anna Maria Adorni Botti (1805–1893)

=== 23 October 2010, Vercelli, Italy ===
- Alfonsa Clerici (1860–1930)

=== 30 October 2010, Oradea, Romania ===
- Szilárd Bogdánffy (1911–1953)

=== 6 November 2010, Porto Alegre, Brazil ===
- Barbara Maix (1818–1873)

== 2011 ==
=== 1 May 2011, Saint Peter's Square, Vatican City ===
- Pope John Paul II (1920–2005) (canonized on 27 April 2014)

=== 7 May 2011, Naples, Italy ===
- Giustino Russolillo (1891–1955) (canonized on 15 May 2022)

=== 15 May 2011, Würzburg, Germany ===
- Georg Häfner (1900–1942)

=== 21 May 2011, Lisbon, Portugal ===
- Maria Clara of the Child Jesus (1843–1899)

=== 22 May 2011, Salvador, Bahia, Brazil ===
- Dulce de Souza Lopes Pontes (1914–1992) (canonized on 13 October 2019)

=== 28 May 2011, Faicchio, Benevento, Italy ===
- Clotilde Micheli (1849–1911)

=== 5 June 2011, El Burgo de Osma, Soria, Spain ===
- Juan de Palafox y Mendoza (1600–1659)

=== 13 June 2011, Dresden, Germany ===
- Alojs Andritzki (1914–1943)

=== 19 June 2011, Dax, Landes, France ===
- Marguerite Rutan (1736–1794)

=== 25 June 2011, Lübeck, Germany ===
- Johannes Prassek (1911–1943)
- Eduard Müller (1911–1943)
- Hermann Lange (1912–1943)

=== 26 June 2011, Milan, Italy ===
- Serafino Morazzone (1747–1822)
- Enrichetta Alfieri (1891–1951)
- Clement Vismara (1897–1988)

=== 3 July 2011, Satu Mare, Romania ===
- János Scheffler (1887–1952)

=== 14 September 2011, Cosenza, Italy ===
- Elena Aiello (1895–1961)

=== 17 September 2011, Turin, Italy ===
- Francesco Paleari (1863–1939)

=== 24 September 2011, Sarajevo, Bosnia and Herzegovina ===
- Maria Jula Ivanišević and companions (+1941)

=== 2 October 2011, Ivrea, Turin, Italy ===
- Antonia Maria Verna (1773–1838)

=== 8 October 2011, Urgell, Lleida, Spain ===
- Anna Maria Janer Anglarill (1800–1885)

=== 29 October 2011, Madrid, Spain ===
- María Catalina Irigoyen Echegaray (1848–1918)

=== 13 November 2011, Dornbirn, Vorarlberg, Austria ===
- Carl Lampert (1894–1944)

=== 17 December 2011, Madrid, Spain ===
- Francisco Esteban Lacal and companions (+1936)

== 2012 ==
=== 29 January 2012, Vienna, Austria ===
- Hildegard Burjan (1883–1933)

=== 21 April 2012, Mexico City, Mexico ===
- Manuela de Jesús Arias Espinosa (1904–1981)

=== 29 April 2012 ===
==== Rome, Italy ====
- Giuseppe Toniolo (1845–1918)

==== Coutances, France ====
- Pierre-Adrien Toulorge (1757–1793)

=== 27 May 2012, Vannes, Morbihan, France ===
- Marie-Louise-Élisabeth de Lamoignon de Molé de Champlâtreux (1763–1825)

=== 3 June 2012, Besançon, France ===
- Alcide-Vital Lataste (1832–1869)

=== 17 June 2012, Nepi, Viterbo, Italy ===
- Cecilia Eusepi (1910–1928)

=== 24 June 2012, Terme, Italy ===
- Mariano Arciero (1707–1788)

=== 22 September 2012, Troyes, France ===
- Louis Brisson (1817–1908)

=== 29 September 2012, Catania, Sicily, Italy ===
- Gabriele Allegra (1907–1976)

=== 13 October 2012, Prague, Czech Republic ===
- Bedřich Bachstein and companions (+1611)

=== 10 November 2012, Perugia, Italy ===
- Gertrude Prosperi (1779–1847)

=== 17 November 2012, Buenos Aires, Argentina ===
- María Angélica Pérez (1897–1932)

=== 24 November 2012, Macas, Morona-Santiago, Ecuador ===
- Maria Troncatti (1883–1969) (canonized on 19 October 2025)

=== 2 December 2012, Tamil Nadu, Nagercoil, India ===
- Devasahayam Pillai (1712–1752) (canonized on 15 May 2022)

== See also ==
- List of people beatified by Pope John XXIII
- List of people beatified by Pope Paul VI
- List of people beatified by Pope John Paul II
- List of people beatified by Pope Francis
