= Vincenza Maria Poloni =

Roman Catholic Sister

Saint Vincenza Maria Poloni ISM
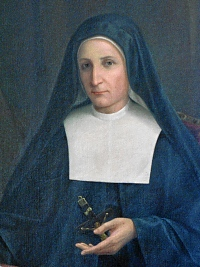
- Born: 26 January 1802; Verona, Venetian Province
- Died: 11 November 1855 (aged 53); Verona, Kingdom of Lombardy–Venetia
- Venerated in: Roman Catholic Church
- Beatified: 21 September 2008, Verona, Italy by Cardinal Angelo Amato
- Canonized: 19 October 2025, Saint Peter's Square, Vatican City by Pope Leo XIV
- Feast: 11 November; 10 September (Sisters of Mercy of Verona)

Vincenza Maria Poloni, ISM, born as Luigia Poloni, (26 January 1802 – 11 November 1855), was an Italian Catholic religious sister who cofounded the Sisters of Mercy of Verona, which she established with Charles Steeb.

Cardinal Angelo Amato, on behalf of Pope Benedict XVI, beatified Poloni in 2008 after the recognition of a miracle attributed to her intercession. She was canonized on 19 October 2025.

== Life ==
Luigia Poloni was born in 1802 in Verona as the last of twelve children to Gaetano Poloni and Margherita Biadego. She was baptized hours after her birth as "Maria Luigia Francesca". She grew up in a Christian environment and was engaged in charitable acts – following in the footsteps of her father who was part of a volunteer group.

Poloni came into contact with the priest Charles Steeb and found in him a friend and confidante. She confided all in him and it was through this connection that her vocation grew. The two established a religious congregation as the two envisioned and Poloni made her religious profession on 10 September 1848. She assumed the name of "Maria Vincenza" at her profession. The two aimed for the new congregation to spread the merciful love of Jesus Christ which was believed to be of paramount importance for it would lift man to full communion with God. Poloni believed that all charitable acts was something that would need to be placed as one of the top priorities in life.

She made it her mission to visit all those who were sick and orphaned; she aimed to console them and to help them with their lives while showing them the love of Christ. She also worked with the poor and said of them: "the poor are our masters".

Poloni was hit with a tumor that consumed her at a slow pace. She underwent an operation to ease the pain but it failed to improve her condition. Poloni died on 11 November 1855 and was buried in the municipal cemetery of Verona in a communal grave with other sisters of the congregation.

== Legacy ==
The congregation that Poloni and Steeb established grew outside of Verona and expanded to nations such as Portugal and Tanzania amongst others in each continent.

== Veneration ==
The beatification process of Vincenza Maria Poloni commenced on 12 March 1990 in Verona and the commencement of the cause conferred upon her the title of Servant of God. The process was ratified on 3 December 1993. The positio, a file of all documentation, was submitted to the Congregation for the Causes of Saints in Rome in 1999. Pope Benedict XVI approved Poloni's heroic virtue and proclaimed her to be venerable on 28 April 2006.

A miracle which was attributed to her intercession was approved by Pope Benedict XVI on 17 December 2007 and Poloni was beatified on 21 September 2008. Cardinal Angelo Amato presided over the beatification on behalf of the pope.

A second miracle – the miraculous healing of a fellow sister of the congregation who had suffered from, among others, a malignant breast tumor and suddenly awoke healed. – was ratified on 27 January 2025. She was canonized by Pope Leo XIV on 19 October 2025.
