= Mária Magdolna Bódi =

Hungarian virgin and martyr (1921–1945)

Blessed Mária Magdolna Bódi
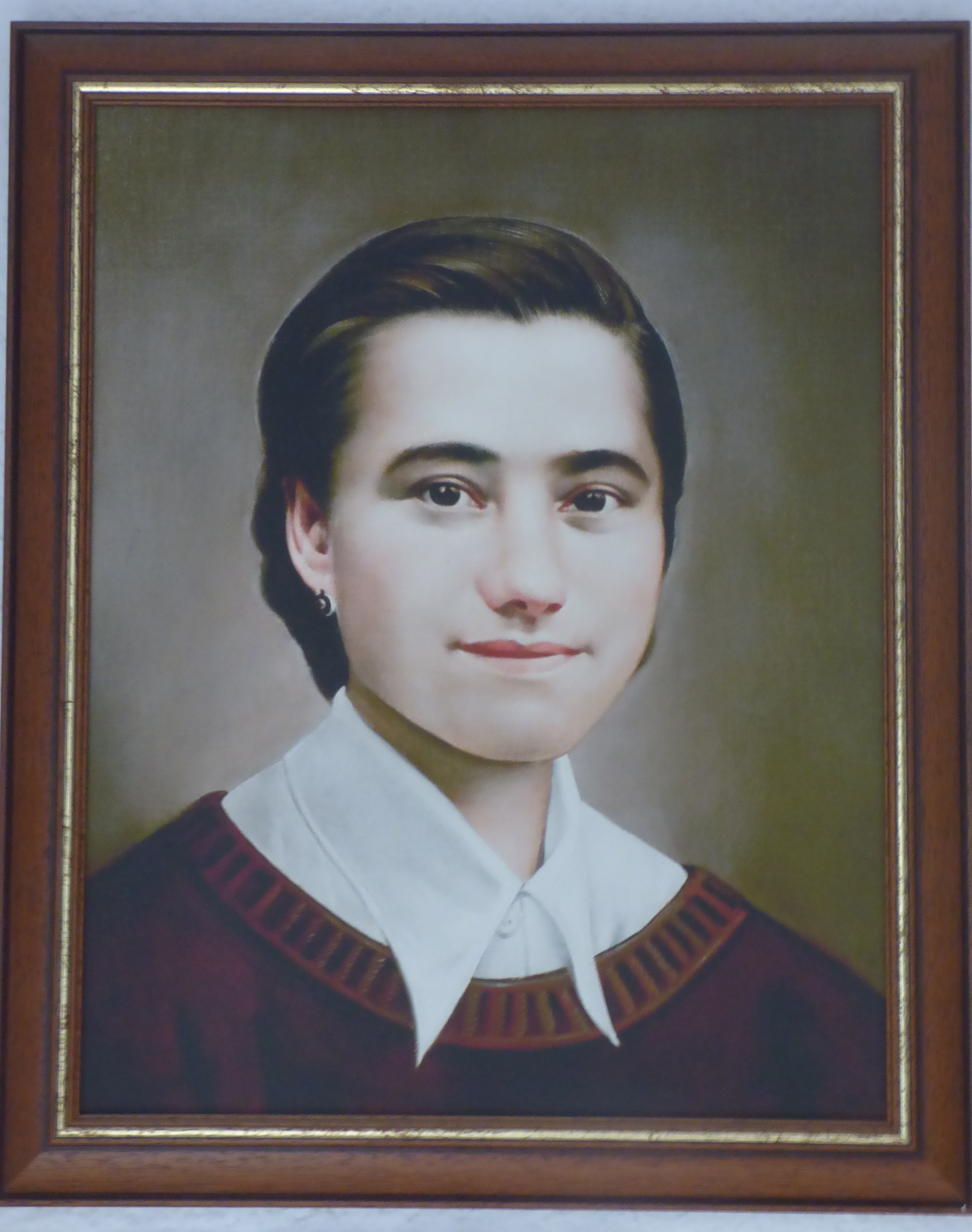
- Painting based on a photograph of Mária Magdolna Bódi

Virgin and martyr
- Born: 8 August 1921; Szigliget
- Died: 23 March 1945 (aged 23); Litér
- Cause of death: murder
- Venerated in: Roman Catholic Church
- Beatified: 6 September 2025, Veszprém Aréna, Veszprém, Hungary by Cardinal Péter Erdő

Mária Magdolna Bódi (August 8, 1921 – March 23, 1945) was a Hungarian Catholic laywoman and martyr who was killed by Soviet soldiers on March 23, 1945. She was beatified by Péter Cardinal Erdő on behalf of Pope Leo XIV on 6 September 2025.

== Life ==
She was born in 1921 in Szigliget. Her parents were servants on a nearby farm. Her father did not have personal documents, so her parents could not get married. She received religious education at a village school, and after her First Communion she began to live a pious life and read spiritual literature. At the age of seventeen, she participated in the people's missions in Balatonfűzfő and decided to dedicate her life to Christ.

In 1939, she was employed at the Nitrokémia Rt. factory in Fűzfőgyártelep. She regularly attended Holy Mass. In 1941 she made a private vow of virginity, and in 1942 she joined the Congregation of Mary. She was an active member of the Society of the Sacred Heart, where she worked with children, and of the Society of Catholic Workers.

During 1944, the front line of the battlefields moved ever closer to her village of Litér. On 23 March 1945, two Soviet soldiers attacked the shelter where she was hiding with her mother; Bódi got in their way and they fired several shots at her. She died holding a rosary with the words: "My Lord and my King! Take my life!"

== Beatification process ==
The Bishop of Veszprém József Mindszenty launched a diocesan investigation after her death, but the documents did not reach the Vatican and in communist Hungary it was forbidden to talk about Bódi. The proceedings were resumed in 1990. Year. In 2010, her dossier in Latin was found in St. Michael's Cathedral, Veszprém, which facilitated the procedure.

The papal decree on her martyrdom was issued on 23 May 2024. Due to the death of Pope Francis on 21 April 2025, her beatification, which was scheduled for a few days later, was postponed until after the 2025 Papal Conclave.
