= Salvador Valera Parra =

Spanish Catholic priest (1816–1889)

Blessed Salvador Valera Parra
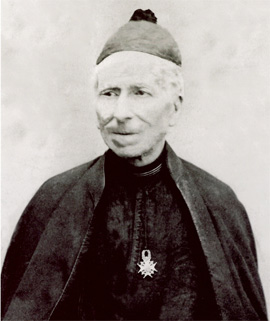
- Church: Roman Catholic Church

Orders
- Ordination: April 4, 1840 by Bishop José Antonio Azpeitia

Personal details
- Born: February 27, 1816 Huércal-Overa, Almería, Spain
- Died: March 15, 1889 (aged 73) Huércal-Overa, Almería, Spain

Sainthood
- Beatified: February 7, 2026; Huércal-Overa, Almería, Spain by Pope Leo XIV

Salvador Valera Parra (27 February 1816 – 15 March 1889), also known as "Cura Valera", was a Spanish Catholic priest who served in the provinces of Murcia and Almería. He was declared Venerable by Pope Francis in March 2021. On 20 June 2025, Pope Leo XIV approved a miracle attributed to Valera's intercession. He was beatified on 7 February 2026 in Huércal-Overa.

== Biography ==
=== Early life ===
Salvador Valera Parra was born in the town of Huércal-Overa on 27 February 1816 to a family of farmers.

At the age of fourteen, he transferred to the city of Murcia to pursue his studies at the Major Seminary of San Fulgencio. He was welcomed in Murcia by his aunt María Josefa, abbess of a convent of Capuchin Poor Clares, where he lived in a nearby house donated to the convent.

=== Priestly ordination ===
Salvador was ordained a priest at the age of 24 on 4 April 1840. It seems that the ordination took place in the city of Alicante, since the Bishop of Cartagena, José Antonio Azpeitia, had moved to the locality of Tudela for medical reasons. About six days later, he celebrated his first Mass on a Friday that spring in the convent of the Poor Clares, which had been a faithful witness to the efforts, sacrifices, and dedication of the young Salvador. With this gesture, Fr. Valera expressed his gratitude for all of the help he had received.

Days after celebrating his first Mass, Fr. Valera returned to his town of Huércal-Overa.

=== First assignments ===
After his time in Huércal-Overa, Fr. Valera was not yet thirty-three when he took charge of the Church of San Lázaro (Alhama de Murcia) in Alhama de Murcia. In this town he lived simply and austerely, bordering poverty, because the residences of the church were some attached barns. He left Alhama in late May 1851.

In the same year, the Diocese of Cartagena began oposiciones, a system of competitive examinations where priests competed for desirable parishes. Fr. Valera won the church of Nuestra Señora de la Asunción, returning to his hometown as a parish priest, where he would remain for the next 13 years.

In 1864, Bishop Landeira of Cartagena, after much prayer, called Fr. Valera to govern the parish of Cartagena, the largest parish in the diocese at that time.

In 1865, the city of Cartagena suffered a cholera epidemic. Fr. Valera fully dedicated himself to bring hope and aid to the sick and their families. The Cartagena City Council recognized his labor in that year's official record, and gifted him a chalice.

On 26 September 1868, Spain's prime minister, General Prim was received by the civil and military authority of the city, who informed him about the virtues of the parish priest Don Salvador Valera.

When General Prim wished to take Fr. Valera to the capital, Madrid, the priest only wished for one thing: to return to his dear town of Huércal-Overa.

The Bishop of Murcia and later Archbishop of Valencia said on the occasion of a priestly ordination: "I only ask you to look at yourselves in the example that I have in Huércal-Overa, in the priest Salvador Valera Parra, in whose example your bishop also looks."

=== Return to Huércal-Overa ===
At the end of the year 1868 his wish was fulfilled, and Salvador Valera returned permanently to Huércal-Overa, with much celebration from his hometown. In the years following, the town witnessed many documented miracles.

== Beatification ==
In 1954, when the Bishop of Cartagena began the first steps of the process of beatification, countless individuals gave testimony of his virtues and merits.

His life has been the subject of several books, and a documentary in 2010. A novena in his honor was published in 2019.

On 18 March 2021, Pope Francis declared Don Salvador Valera to be "Venerable" because he had lived the heroic virtues, was a model of a diocesan priest, and was a good and humble shepherd of his people.

The beatification of Don Salvador Valera depended on a singular miracle attributed to his intercession. On the night of 14 January 2007 in the Memorial Hospital of Rhode Island, USA, a boy named Tyquan Hall was born via emergency C-section, pale and lifeless, with a slow and weak pulse. One hour after the neonatal recovery protocol was initiated, there were no signs of improvement, and the nurse could no longer find a pulse. The doctor who was treating him, Dr. Juan Sánchez-Esteban, was a native of Huércal-Overa, and, out of desperation, asked for the intercession of his countryman with the prayer: "Father Valera, I have done everything possible; now it's your turn (Cura Valera, he hecho todo lo que ha sido posible, ahora te toca a ti)." Dr. Sánchez was beginning to walk down the hall to notify the boy's parents of his death when the nurse reported that the child was recovering. Minutes after the doctor's prayer, the boy began to breathe again, and his heart began to beat normally. After this difficult episode, Tyquan should have been damaged developmentally in language and mobility due to cerebral palsy, but he remained without any such effects, learning to speak at 18 months and to walk at 2 years.

The canonical process of investigation into this supposed miracle was conducted by the Roman Catholic Diocese of Providence in Rhode Island, USA from 8–19 September 2014. On 26 June 2015, the miracle's validity was declared on the diocesan level. After the investigation and study by the Dicastery for the Causes of Saints, the miracle positively passed the study of historians and theologians as well as a complex medical consultation. The Cardinals and Bishops of the Dicastery then presented the conclusions to Pope Leo XIV, who, on 20 June 2025, approved the miracle.

Following the miracle's approval, his beatification ceremony, presided over by Cardinal Marcello Semeraro (representing Pope Leo XIV), took place on 7 February 2026 in Huércal-Overa.

== Recognition ==
In Huércal-Overa, a monument, a street, and an institute—the Cura Valera Secondary Education Institute—are named after Fr. Valera.

Every year on February 27, Fr. Valera's birthday, his hometown celebrates a Mass in his honor, followed by floral offerings in front of the monument which bears his name.
