= Stanisław Kostka Streich =

Polish priest (1902–1938)

Blessed Stanisław Kostka Streich
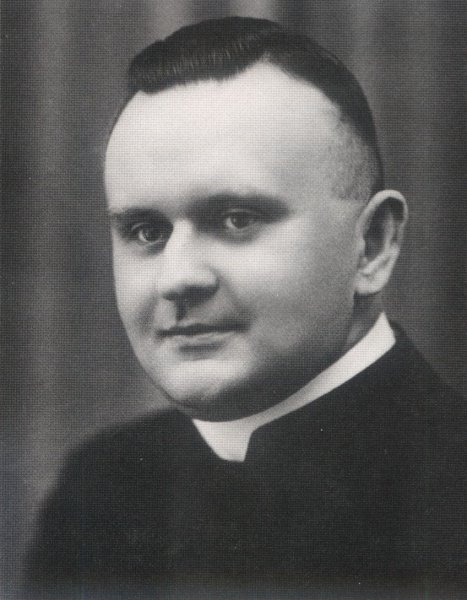
- Streich in 1938
- Born: August 27, 1902; Bromberg, German Empire
- Died: February 27, 1938 (aged 35); Luboń, Poland
- Resting place: Saint John Bosco Church, Luboń, Poland
- Beatified: 24 May, 2025, Square of the Cathedral of St. Apostles Peter and Paul, Poznań, Poland
- Feast: 27 February

Stanisław Kostka Streich (27 August 1902, Bromberg – 27 February 1938, Luboń) was a Polish Roman Catholic priest who was murdered by a communist assassin during the celebration of Holy Mass. The Catholic Church venerates him as a martyr.

== Biography ==
He was born on August 27, 1902, in Bromberg at 53 Pomorska Street, as the son of Franciszek and Władysława, née Birzyńska. He was ordained a priest on June 6, 1925, after graduating from the seminary in Poznań. In the years 1925–1927, he studied classical philosophy at the University of Poznań, where he also served as chaplain to the Ursuline sisters and as a religion teacher at the Poznań business school. In 1927, he became a vicar at the parish of St. Florian in Poznań. In 1928, he moved to Koźmin to teach religion at the men's teacher training seminary. In 1929, he became a vicar at the Corpus Christi parish in Poznań, and in 1932, a vicar at the St. Martin parish in the same city. From 1933, he served as parish priest at the St. Barbara parish in Żabikowo, after having passed the examination required for that office on July 1. He immediately began efforts to build a new church in nearby Luboń, into which the territory of the Żabikowo parish extended. In 1935, the parish of St. John Bosco in Luboń was established (separated from the Żabikowo parish), and he became its first parish priest on October 1, 1935.

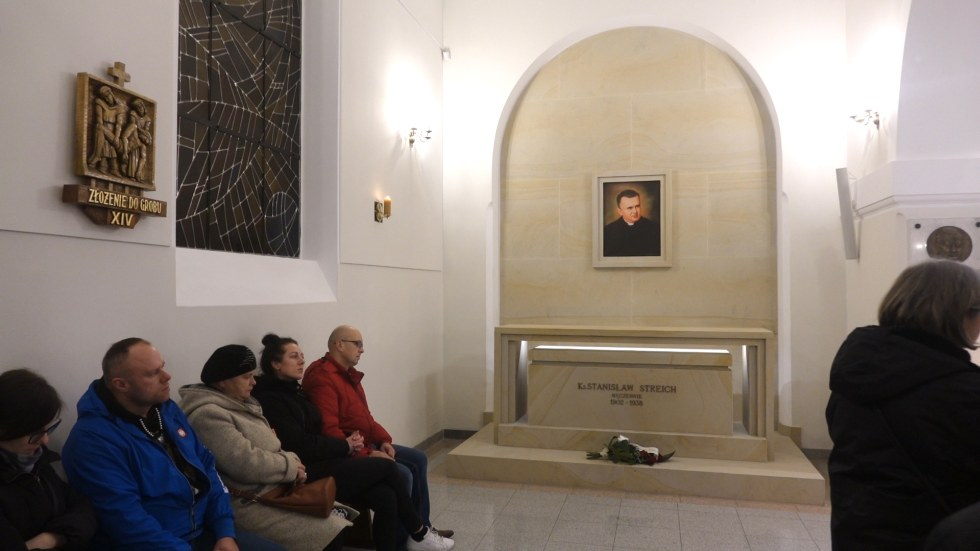
Sarcophagus with his remains in the Church of St. John Bosco in Luboń

On 27 February, 1938, during the morning Mass for children, at the Church of St. John Bosco, while he was about to read the Gospel and deliver the sermon, he was shot twice by a man dressed in a black coat. One bullet struck the priest in the face, and the other became lodged in the Gospel book. The killer then fired two more shots into his back as well. According to the testimony of the sexton Franciszek Krawczyński and other witnesses, the killer ran to the pulpit shouting, "Long live communism!" and "Get out of the church, this is for your freedom!" When the sexton heard the shots, he ran out of the sacristy and attacked the killer, grabbing him by the hand that held the pistol. A scuffle ensued, during which more shots were fired: Krawczyński was wounded in the right temple and left shoulder, and bullets also injured two other people. The killer attempted to escape through the unfinished nave of the church, but was caught and disarmed by three men. The crowd wanted to lynch him. He was taken to the waiting room at the station near the church. In handcuffs, he was transported by train to Poznań. On March 21, 1938, the District Court in Poznań sentenced 47-year-old Wawrzyniec Nowak to death. Officially, the sentence was carried out on January 28, 1939, although there are reasons to doubt this execution. The priest's grave was located near the parish church of St. John Bosco, where he had been parish priest. On January 20, 2024, his remains were exhumed and placed in a sarcophagus directly inside the church.

== Veneration ==
On May 23, 2024, Pope Francis signed the decree on Kostka Streich's martyrdom. He was then beatified on May 24, 2025, in the square next to the Poznań Cathedral. The ceremony was presided over, on behalf of Pope Leo XIV, by Cardinal Marcello Semeraro. His feast day is on 27 February.
