= Luigi Monza =

Italian Roman Catholic priest (1898–1954)

Blessed Luigi Monza
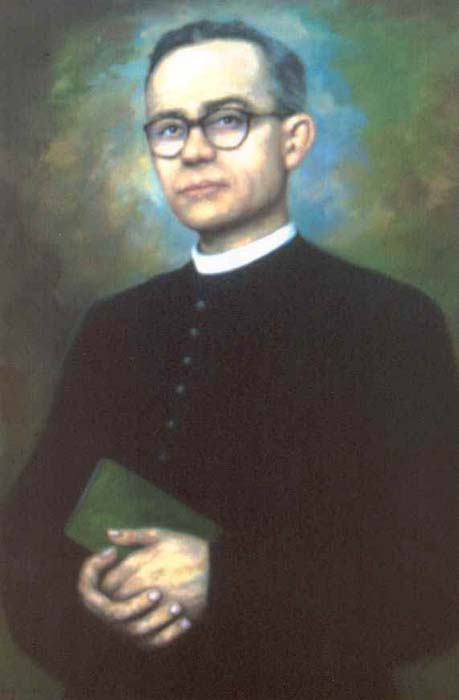

Priest
- Born: 22 June 1898; Cislago, Varese, Kingdom of Italy
- Died: 29 September 1954 (aged 56); Lecco, Italy
- Venerated in: Roman Catholic Church
- Beatified: 30 April 2006, Milan, Italy by Cardinal José Saraiva Martins
- Feast: 29 September
- Attributes: Cassock
- Patronage: Secular Institute of the Little Apostles of Charity

Blessed Luigi Monza (22 June 1898 - 29 September 1954) was an Italian Roman Catholic priest and the founder of the Secular Institute of the Little Apostles of Charity. Monza's pastoral mission was defined with catering to the needs of the poor and the sick and used his new congregation as a means of spreading this mission.

Monza was beatified on 30 April 2006 in Milan after Pope Benedict XVI approved his beatification; Cardinal José Saraiva Martins presided on the pope's behalf.

== Life ==
Luigi Monza was born in Varese on 22 June 1898.

He commenced his studies for the priesthood at the age of eighteen. In 1916 he was appointed as the prefect at the Collegio Villoresi San Giuseppe di Monza and was ordained as a priest for the Archdiocese of Milan on 19 September 1925. Monza worked in the parish of Vedano Olona with adolescents in religious oratories.

In the 1920s the Fascists accused Monza of having planned an attack on the local magistrate and as a result he was apprehended and imprisoned. But he was acquitted and released four months after his imprisonment.

Monza was transferred in 1929 to Saronno and worked with adolescents in a range of local initiatives. He referred to the modern world as being "paganized". He was sent in 1936 to Lecco where he became a popular priest and was available for the needs of the sick and the poor. In World War II he spent his time tending to the victims while attempting to protect the parishioners from the horrors of the conflict. Monza founded his new religious congregation in 1937 in order to promote his pastoral mission and to tend to the plight of the poor. The order was quick to spread in places such as Ecuador and Sudan.

Monza died of a heart attack on 29 September 1954. His remains were placed in Como but were relocated in 1964.

== Beatification ==
The beatification process commenced in Milan after the Congregation for the Causes of Saints granted formal approval to the introduction of the cause on 23 June 1987 after giving the "nihil obstat" (nothing against) to the cause. This move granted Monza the title of Servant of God - the official first phase in the proceedings. The diocesan process that ensured opened on 24 November 1987, and concluded its work in 1991. The C.C.S. validated the process in 1993 in Rome and initiated the so-called "Roman Phase".

The postulation submitted the Positio to the C.C.S. in 1997 in order for the latter to commence their own investigation into Monza's life and assess his cause. On 20 December 2003 he was proclaimed to be Venerable after Pope John Paul II approved the fact that Monza had lived a life of heroic virtue.

The required miracle needed for beatification was investigated in the diocese of its origin and received C.C.S. validation on 8 November 1996. It received the papal approval of Pope Benedict XVI on 19 December 2005, and allowed for a beatification to take place. Monza was beatified in Milan on 30 April 2006. Cardinal José Saraiva Martins presided on the behalf of the pope.

The current postulator assigned to the cause is the Rev. Shijo Kanjirathamkunnel.
