= Beatifications of Pope Pius XII =

Among the persons beatified by Pius XII, a majority are women, with Spanish, Italian and French backgrounds and others.

No.	Blessed	Date of Beatification	Place of Beatification
1.	Emily de Vialar	18 June 1939	Rome, Italy
2.	Justin de Jacobis	25 June 1939	St. Peter's Basilica, Vatican City
3.	Rose Philippine Duchesne	12 May 1940	St. Peter's Basilica, Vatican City
4.	Joaquina Vedruna de Mas	19 May 1940	Saint Peter's Basilica, Vatican City
5.	Maria Crocifissa di Rosa	26 May 1940	St. Peter's Basilica, Vatican City
6.	Émilie de Rodat	9 June 1940	St. Peter's Basilica, Vatican City
7.	Ignatius of Laconi	16 June 1940	Rome, Italy
8.	Magdalene of Canossa	7 December 1941	St. Peter's Basilica, Vatican City
9.	Sophie-Thérèse de Soubiran La Louvière	20 October 1946	St. Peter's Basilica, Vatican City
10.	Ignazia Verzeri	27 October 1946	St. Peter's Basilica, Vatican City
11.	The Franciscan Martyrs of China	24 November 1946	St. Peter's Basilica, Vatican City
12.	Contardo Ferrini	13 April 1947	Saint Peter's Square, Vatican City
13.	Maria Goretti	27 April 1947	Rome, Italy
14.	Alix Le Clerc	4 May 1947	Vatican City
15.	Jeanne Delanoue	8 November 1947	Saint Peter's Square, Vatican City
16.	Benildus Romancon	4 April 1948	Vatican City
17.	Vincent Pallotti	22 January 1950	Rome, Italy
18.	Maria Soledad Torres y Acosta	5 February 1950	Vatican City
19.	Vincentia Maria López y Vicuña	19 February 1950	St. Peter's Basilica, Vatican City
20.	Dominic Savio	5 March 1950	Rome, Italy
21.	Paola Elisabetta Cerioli	19 March 1950	Saint Peter's Basilica, Vatican City
22.	Maria De Mattias	1 October 1950	Saint Peter's Basilica, Vatican City
23.	Anne-Marie Javouhey	15 October 1950	Rome, Italy
24.	Marguerite Bourgeoys	12 November 1950	Rome, Italy
25.	Alberic Crescitelli	18 February 1951	Saint Peter's Basilica, Vatican City
26.	Francis Fasani	15 April 1951	Rome, Italy
27.	25 Vietnamese Martyrs	29 April 1951	Saint Peter's Basilica, Vatican City
28.	Placide Viel	6 May 1951	Saint Peter's Basilica, Vatican City
29.	Julian Maunoir	20 May 1951	Saint Peter's Basilica, Vatican City
30.	Pope Pius X	3 June 1951	Saint Peter's Basilica, Vatican City
31.	Thérèse Couderc	4 November 1951	Saint Peter's Basilica, Vatican City
32.	Rose Venerini	4 May 1952	Rome, Italy
33.	Rafaela Porras Ayllón	18 May 1952	Saint Peter's Basilica, Vatican City
34.	Maria Bertilla Boscardin	8 June 1952	Saint Peter's Basilica, Vatican City
35.	Antonio Maria Pucci	12 June 1952	Saint Peter's Basilica, Vatican City
36.	Maria Assunta Pallotta	7 November 1954	St. Peter's Basilica, Vatican City
37.	Jean-Martin Moye	21 November 1954	Rome, Italy
38.	Tommaso Riccardi	5 December 1954	St. Peter's Basilica, Vatican City
39.	Léon-Ignace Mangin and 55 Companions	17 April 1955	Rome, Italy
40.	Marcellin Champagnat	29 May 1955	St. Peter's Basilica, Vatican City
41.	Jean-Baptiste Turpin du Cormier and 18 Companions	19 June 1955	Rome, Italy
42.	Pope Innocent XI	7 October 1956	St. Peter's Basilica, Vatican City
43.	Eugénie Smet	26 May 1957	Rome, Italy
44.	Teresa Jornet Ibars	27 April 1958	Saint Peter's Basilica, Vatican City

== See also ==
- List of people beatified by Pope John XXIII
- List of people beatified by Pope Paul VI
- List of people beatified by Pope John Paul II
- List of people beatified by Pope Benedict XVI
- List of people beatified by Pope Francis
- List of people beatified by Pope Leo XIV
