= Ángela Ginard Martí =

Blessed Ángela Ginard Martí HCCE

Martyr
- Born: 3 April 1894; Lluchmayor, Mallorca, Islas Baleares, Kingdom of Spain
- Died: 26 August 1936 (aged 42); Dehesa de la Villa, Madrid, Second Spanish Republic
- Venerated in: Roman Catholic Church
- Beatified: 29 October 2005, Saint Peter's Basilica, Vatican City by Cardinal José Saraiva Martins
- Feast: 26 August

Ángela Ginard Martí (3 April 1894 – 26 August 1936), religious name Maria de los Ángeles, was a Spanish religious sister of the Congration of the Hermanas Celadoras del Culto Eucarístico. She suffered martyrdom in 1936, when she was killed during the onslaught of the Spanish Civil War, and was beatified in 2005.

== Life ==
Ángela Ginard Martí was born on 3 April 1894 in Llucmajor as the third of nine children to Sebastián Ginard García and Margarita Martí Canals. Her father's retirement from the Civil Guard saw the Ginard's move to Palma de Mallorca when she was sixteen where the three eldest sisters (including herself) helped around the house and learnt to embroider and make hats.

It was after her First Communion on 14 April 1905 that she had the desire to consecrate herself to Jesus Christ and realized that it would be through the religious life as a nun. It was also after this experience that she made frequent visits to the tabernacle where she would kneel in reflection before Him to further discern her vocation and to strengthen her own faith. Even the example of her two maternal aunts who were nuns had a profound effect on her growing up. But she admired one of those aunts in particular due to the contemplative life she led in her convent. Her sisters often went out with friends to the cinema or other social engagements while she preferred to remain at home to instruct her other siblings in catechism and the lives of the saints.

In 1914 she asked her parents for permission to enter the convent her aunt was stationed in but her parents (her father in particular) opposed the idea and advised her to wait and think more on it. Ginard entered the Hermanas Celadoras del Culto Eucarístico in Palma de Mallorca on 26 November 1921 and assumed the religious name Maria de los Ángeles; she began the postulancy in May 1922 before commencing her novitiate six months later. In 1923 she made her first profession and renewed it in 1926 (then being moved to the house in Madrid) before making her final profession later in 1929 in Barcelona where she was stationed until 1932 when she returned to Madrid. Ginard did embroidering for the cloths used for the altar and also prepared the bread that would be made into the Eucharistic hosts.

When the Spanish Civil War broke out it forced nuns and priests alike to go underground due to the danger against them. The nuns of her convent were forced on 20 July 1936 to disperse while using disguises to flee. During the conflict she hid in an apartment but was arrested during the afternoon on 25 August 1936. The guards who raided the apartment accused a woman of being another nun but Ginard stepped forward to confirm that she was the sole nun living in the apartment. The guards escorted her outside to a waiting car and drove off with her. Ginard was shot dead in a park either in the afternoon or evening on 26 August 1936 and her remains were left at the site of the killing. The next morning the sisters were looking through files at a government building and found pictures of her corpse. The sisters went to the site to reclaim her remains for a proper burial. Her remains were exhumed moved on 20 May 1941 and again in 1984 to the convent where she lived.

== Beatification ==
The diocesan process was held in Madrid with Cardinal Ángel Suquía Goicoechea inaugurating the investigation on 28 April 1987 and later closing on 23 March 1990; the Congregation for the Causes of Saints validated this process on 18 October 1991 and received the Positio dossier from the postulation in 1993 for additional assessment.

John Paul II granted the final approval needed for the cause on 19 April 2004 and confirmed that Ginard would soon be beatified after determining that she had died in odium fidei ("in hatred of the faith"). The beatification was celebrated on 29 October 2005 in Saint Peter's Basilica with Cardinal José Saraiva Martins presiding on the behalf of Pope Benedict XVI.
