= Giovanna Francesca Michelotti =

Blessed Giovanna Francesca Michelotti
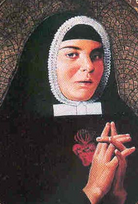

Virgin
- Born: 29 August 1843; Annecy, Savoy, Kingdom of Sardinia
- Died: 1 February 1888 (aged 44); Turin, Kingdom of Italy
- Venerated in: Roman Catholic Church
- Beatified: 1 November 1975, Saint Peter's Basilica by Pope Paul VI
- Feast: 1 February

Giovanna Francesca Michelotti (29 August 1843 – 1 February 1888), born Anna Michelotti, was an Italian religious sister. Upon her investiture, Michelotti assumed the name Giovanna Francesca. She established a new religious congregation which she named the Little Servants of the Sacred Heart of Jesus for the Sick Poor. She was beatified on 1 November 1975.

== Life ==
Anna Michelotti was born on 29 August 1843 in Annecy, Kingdom of Sardinia (today France) and remained fatherless as a child. She had at least one brother. She lived in a poor state and despite this she grew in her faith as well as her undivided attention to the plight of all of those who were poor. This marked the beginning of her calling to religious life.

Michelotti travelled across France for her studies at the Institute of the Sisters of Saint Charles and she asked to enter their novitiate. Despite this, her path was elsewhere. In 1863 she was left alone with the death of her mother and her brother Antonio. She went to her paternal relatives in Almese and later went to Turin. It was there in 1874 that she donned the habit for the first time and made her solemn profession.

To work with the poor and the sick, in 1875 she established a new congregation to devote efforts to them alone. She was a teacher for a brief period of time and spent her time at the tomb of Francis de Sales. She used her free time to read and meditate on sacred scripture and worked to spread the message of Jesus Christ to the poor, as well as to bring them the sacraments. Before making major decisions, she sought the advice of confessors such as John Bosco.

Michelotti died in 1888 after a long period of ill health from bronchial asthma.

== Beatification ==
The beatification process began in Turin in 1933 and completed on 24 October 1935. Michelotti's spiritual writings were approved by theologians on 27 November 1937, and her cause was formally opened on 6 December 1942 under Pope Pius XII, granting her the title Servant of God. The second process opened also in Turin and spanned from 1946 until 1947; both processes were granted the formal decree of ratification in 1952 for the cause to proceed to Rome for further evaluation.

On 15 December 1966 her life of heroic virtue was recognized and it allowed for Pope Paul VI to declare her to be Venerable. He also approved a miracle almost a decade later and beatified her on 1 November 1975.
