= Little Servants of the Sacred Heart of Jesus for the Sick Poor =

The Little Servants of the Sacred Heart of Jesus for the Sick Poor (Italian: Piccole Serve del Sacro Cuore di Gesù per gli Ammalati Poveri; Latin: Congregatio Parvarum Servarum a S. Corde Iesu pro infirmis pauperibus; abbreviation: P.S.S.C.) is a religious institute of pontifical right whose members profess public vows of chastity, poverty, and obedience and follow the evangelical way of life in common.

Their principal mission is to visit and tend the lonely sick who were suffering and dying at home.

This religious institute was founded in Turin, Italy, in 1874, by Blessed Giovanna Francesca Michelotti.

The sisters have houses in Italy, Romania and Madagascar. The Generalate of the Congregation can be found in Turin, Italy.

On 31 December 2005 there are 158 sisters in 21 communities.
