= Clelia Barbieri =

Italian religious sister and saint

Saint Clelia Barbieri
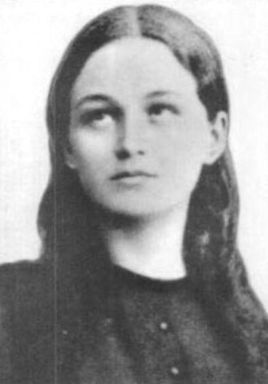
- Born: 13 February 1847; Le Budrie di Persiceto, San Giovanni in Persiceto, Papal States
- Died: 13 July 1870 (aged 23); Le Budrie di Persiceto, San Giovanni in Persiceto, Kingdom of Italy
- Venerated in: Catholic Church
- Beatified: 27 October 1968, Saint Peter's Basilica, Vatican City by Pope Paul VI
- Canonized: 9 April 1989, Saint Peter's Square, Vatican City by Pope John Paul II
- Feast: 13 July

Clelia Barbieri (13 February 1847 – 13 July 1870) was an Italian Catholic and the founder of the Little Sisters of the Mother of Sorrows. She is regarded as the youngest founder of a religious congregation in the history of the Catholic church, as she was just twenty-three when she died. Barbieri declined the married life in her adolescence – even when pressured – in favor of leading a life dedicated to the needs of others; she served as an educator for a while and joined a religious movement which made her a notable figure in her village.

Barbieri's beatification cause was opened on 15 March 1930, progressed with her beatification on 27 October 1968, and culminated with her canonization on 9 April 1989 under Pope John Paul II.

== Life ==
Clelia Barbieri was born in the village of Le Budrie, San Giovanni in Persiceto in 1847 to the poor workers Giuseppe Barbieri and Giacinta Nannetti. Barbieri was baptized straight after her birth as "Clelia Rachele Maria". Her father died in 1855 due to a cholera epidemic so she started to work alongside her mother spinning hemp to support her siblings. During this time her mother and Ernestina moved into a house near the local parish church due to her doctor uncle's personal intervention. The girl started to spend her time in deep contemplation during her childhood and despite her poverty, she was raised in a pious household in which religious education was imparted to her. She made her First Communion on 17 June 1858.

Barbieri later joined "The Workers of Christian Catechism" as an assistant teacher in 1861 and became such an inspirational leader that the parish priest – Father Gaetano Guido – entrusted her with the teaching and guidance of girls in doctrine. Up until 1864, she rejected marriage offers put forth to her and opted instead to lead a pious life of service to others. Barbieri soon founded a separate group known as the "Suore Minime dell'Addolorata" (01-05-1868) aged 21. This group began to minister to the poor and the sick in the local area. When they ran out of food, Clelia led prayers to St Francis of Paola, and the shelves were replenished.

Barbieri died due to tuberculosis in 1870. Her religious order operates in places such as Tanzania and India and in 2008 there were 296 religious houses in 36 different communities.

=== The voice ===
Barbieri's death soon resulted in an unusual and unexplained occurrence that has often been reported in the various parishes that she visited and in the houses in which her order is located. Her voice is often heard during scriptural readings and songs and this voice never speaks alone but is heard as part of a group. People from various backgrounds have reported hearing the voice which is described to be unlike any they have ever heard. The first reported occurrence happened in 1871 when the sisters of her congregation were in their usual evening meditation.

== Beatification process ==
The informative and apostolic processes for the beatification all occurred in Bologna before the theologians collated and inspected her spiritual writings while confirming on 2 April 1935 that such writings did not contravene official doctrine; the formal introduction to the cause came under Pope Pius XI on 15 March 1939 and Barbieri was titled as a Servant of God as a result. The confirmation of her life of heroic virtue on 22 February 1955 allowed for Pope Pius XII to name her as venerable, while the confirmation of two miracles attributed to her intercession allowed for Pope Paul VI to celebrate her beatification in Saint Peter's Basilica on 27 October 1968.

A third miracle was investigated in its place of origin and the Congregation for the Causes of Saints validated this diocesan process after it was held on 18 April 1986 while medical experts approved this miracle on 23 March 1988 as did theologians on 17 June 1988; the ongregation for the Causes of Saints met and also assented to it on 6 December 1988 while Pope John Paul II issued definitive approval to it on 11 February 1989. John Paul II canonized Barbieri on 9 April 1989 in Saint Peter's Square.

== Sources ==
- Ball, Ann (1998). Faces of Holiness: Modern Saints in Photos and Words. New York: Our Sunday Visitor Publishing. ISBN 0-87973-950-9
- Cruz, Joan (1984). Relics. New York: Our Sunday Visitor Publishing. ISBN 9780879737016. ISBN 0-87973-701-8
