= Antonia of Florence =

Italian female saint

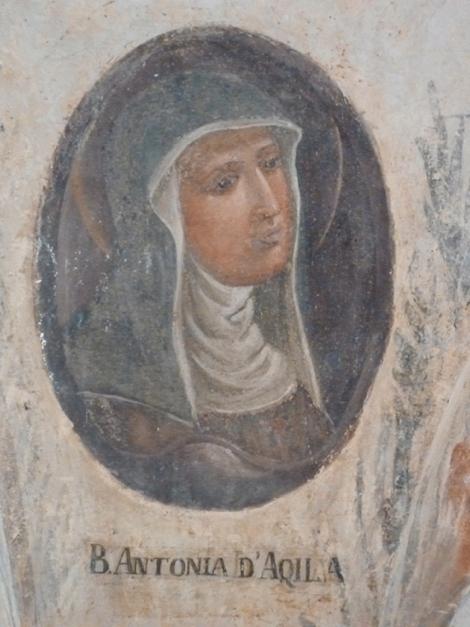
A fresco depiction from ca. 1500

Antonia of Florence is an Italian blessed. She was abbess of the Monastery of Corpus Christi in L'Aquila.

== Life ==
Antonia was born in Florence in 1401 and married at a young age. She and her husband had one child, a son.

After her husband's death in 1428, she joined the Third Order of Saint Francis. She then joined a women's community in Foligno, where she was soon appointed superior. In 1433, she was transferred to L'Aquila to supervise a monastery, a position she held for thirteen years. Desiring a more austere life, she then entered the Corpus Christi Monastery of the Poor Clares in L'Aquila, where she became abbess. Her spiritual director was John of Capistrano.

Antonia died on 29 February 1472. Many miracles occurred at her tomb and her body has remained incorrupt. She was beatified by Pope Pius IX in 1847.
