= Sisters of Mercy of Verona =

Roman Catholic community

The Sisters of Mercy of Verona (Italian: Sorelle della Misericordia; Latin: Institutum Sororum a Misericordia Veronensium; abbreviation: ISM) is a religious institute of pontifical right in the Roman Catholic Church. Its members make public vows of chastity, poverty, and obedience and follow the evangelical way of life in common.

Their mission is primarily for the care of the sick in hospitals and subsequently for the education of youth. Their rule is based on that of Vincent de Paul.

This religious institute was founded in Verona, Italy, in 1840, by Charles Steeb, with the help of Vincenza Maria Poloni, the first superior, who assumed the name of "mother Vincent Mary". The institute received pontifical status in 1931.

The sisters have houses in Albania, Angola, Argentina, Brazil, Burundi, Chile, Germany, Italy, Portugal, Tanzania and the Generalate of the Congregation can be found in Verona, Italy; in 2008 there are 1029 sisters around the world.
