= Francesco Paleari =

Italian priest

Blessed Francesco Paleari

Priest
- Born: 22 October 1863; Pogliano Milanese, Milan, Kingdom of Italy
- Died: 7 May 1939 (aged 75); Turin, Kingdom of Italy
- Venerated in: Roman Catholic Church
- Beatified: 17 September 2011, Turin, Italy by Cardinal Angelo Amato
- Feast: 7 May
- Attributes: Priest's cassock

Francesco Paleari (22 October 1863 – 7 May 1939) was an Italian priest and a member of the Society of the Priests of Saint Giuseppe Benedetto Cottolengo. He was a noted preacher and was involved in the work of social services to the poor.

He was beatified in 2011 after a healing was recognized as a miracle attributed to him.

== Life ==
Francesco Paleari was born on 22 October 1863 as the last of eight children to Angelo Peleari and Serafina Oldani. As a child he was inclined to favor the poor and he invited them home after mass.

He travelled to Turin to follow the example of Giuseppe Benedetto Cottolengo on the advice of his parish priest and commenced his studies for the priesthood. He was tormented with the choice he made so tried to leave for his home but he decided against it so continued his studies. He was ordained as a priest at the age of 23 on 18 September 1886 and received papal dispensation due to his age which was lower than the required age. The Cardinal Archbishop of Turin Gaetano Alimonda. He then joined an order that Cottolengo established.

Paleari focused on work with the children and was known to take all opportunities to preach to them and he also heard confessions wherever possible. He was a noted preacher and people flocked to him to ask him for advice. The Archbishop of Turin assigned him to hearing confessions and preaching retreats.

He died in his sleep in 1939. Hundreds of people filed past his coffin during his funeral.

== Beatification ==
The beatification process commenced on 11 June 1947 in a local process in Turin that granted him the title Servant of God. The process gathered witness testimonies and documentation and concluded all of its work in 1958. The process was granted formal ratification in 1991 so that the cause was able to proceed to the next phase. The Positio - documentation on his life of heroic virtue - was submitted to the Congregation for the Causes of Saints in Rome in 1991.

Pope John Paul II approved his life of heroic virtue and conferred upon him the title of Venerable on 6 April 1998.

A miracle discovered in Turin underwent investigation from 3 November 2005 to 10 March 2006 and was ratified on 30 November 2006. Pope Benedict XVI approved the miracle - which underwent vigorous investigation in Rome - on 10 December 2010 and allowed for his beatification. Cardinal Angelo Amato beatified him in Turin on 17 September 2011.
