= Noël Pinot =

French priest (1747–1794)

Blessed Noël Pinot
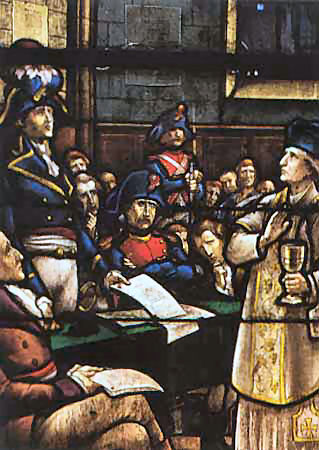
- Stained glass window of the church of Louroux-Béconnais showing the second trial of Noël Pinot, before the military commission of Angers, February 21, 1794.

Priest and martyr
- Born: 19 December 1747; Angers, Kingdom of France
- Died: 21 February 1794 (aged 46); Angers, Revolutionary France
- Venerated in: Roman Catholic Church
- Beatified: 31 October 1926 by Pope Pius XI
- Feast: February 21

Noël Pinot (English: /piːˈnoʊ/ pee-NOH, French: [nɔɛl pino]; 9 December 1747 – 21 February 1794) was a French refractory priest who was guillotined during the War in the Vendée. He was beatified by the Catholic Church and considered a martyr.

== Biography ==
Born in Angers on 9 December 1747, the last of sixteen children to a weaver, he lost his father when he was eight years old. He entered the seminary in Angers. He was ordained a priest on 22 December 1770.

He was first appointed vicar in Bousse in 1772 and then chaplain at Angers in August 1781. In September 1789, he became pastor of Le Louroux-Béconnais commune.

During the French Revolution, he refused to take the oath of the Civil Constitution of the Clergy unlike his superior, Mathurin Garanger who took the oath on 23 January 1791 and was later a member of the Petite Église. He was accused by the revolutionary municipality of "engaging in ecclesiastical activities to oppose the law". On 27 February, he was brought before the court.

Denounced, he was arrested on 5 March and sentenced to exile by the District Court. He hid in Beaupréau. Returning to Louroux in 1793, during the War of Vendée, he went into hiding after the failure of the royalist insurgents against Nantes.

He was arrested on the night of 8 February 1794 during a clandestine Mass he was celebrating at the farm of Milandrie at Louroux-Béconnais, where he was hiding. He was taken to Angers, appeared before the Commission militaire révolutionnaire and was guillotined on 3 Ventôse An II of the French Republican calendar at the Plâce du Ralliement in Angers.

He was executed wearing the vestments he was wearing at the time of his arrest. As he mounted the scaffold, he began reciting the opening prayers of the Mass, including Introibo ad altare Dei (from Psalm 42). A statue at the Cathedral of Angers represents the first step of climbing the "altar of God".

== Veneration ==
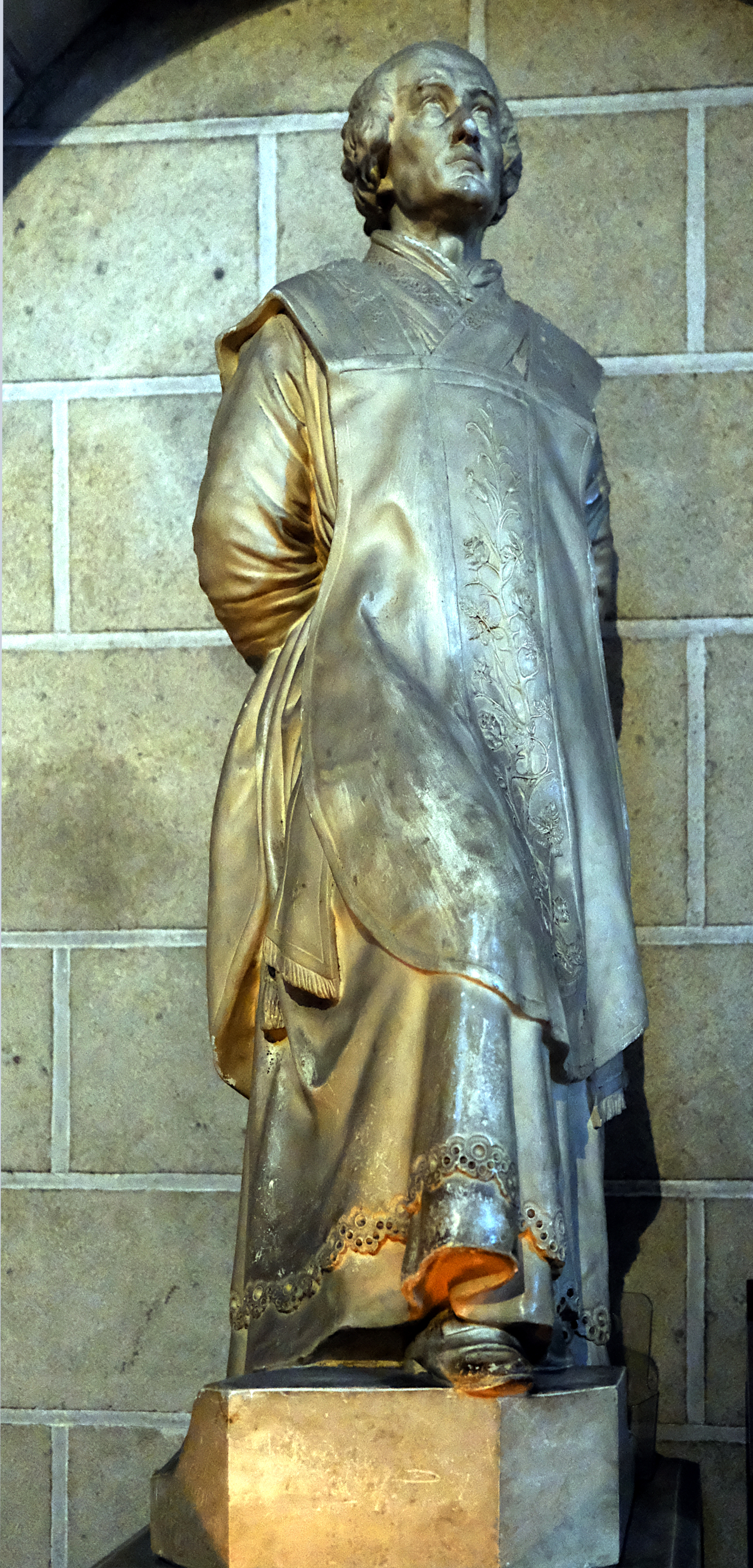
Statue of Noël Pinot in the Cathedral of St. Maurice in Angers.

On 26 August 1864, Guillaume Angebault, Bishop of Angers recommended Father Brouillet to the commission to "proceed with the canonical investigation into the life and virtues of the priest".

He was beatified by Pope Pius XI in October 1926. Ninety-nine Martyrs d'Angers were beatified by Pope John Paul II on 19 February 1984. His feast day is celebrated on 21 February.

A statue in Angers Cathedral depicts him climbing the first step of "the altar of God".

== See also ==
- Persecution of Catholics
- Anti-Catholics
- Dechristianization of France during the French Revolution
