= Little Sisters of Our Lady of Sorrows =

The Little Sisters of Our Lady of Sorrows (Italian: Suore Minime dell'Addolorata; Latin: Institutum Sororum Minimarum a Virgine Perdolente, M.I.N.) is a religious institute of pontifical right whose members profess public vows of chastity, poverty, and obedience and follow the evangelical way of life in common.

Their mission includes missionary work, pastoral ministry, education of youth, and care of the sick and aged.

This religious institute was founded in Le Budrie, near San Giovanni in Persiceto, Italy, in 1868, by St. Clelia Barbieri.

The sisters have houses in Brazil, India, Italy and Tanzania. The Generalate of the Congregation can be found in Le Budrie, near Bologna, Italy. On 31 December 2008, there were 294 sisters in 26 communities. The current superior-general of the institute is Mother Vincenza Di Nuzzo.
