= Władysław Findysz =

Polish Roman Catholic priest (1907–1964)

Blessed Władysław Findysz
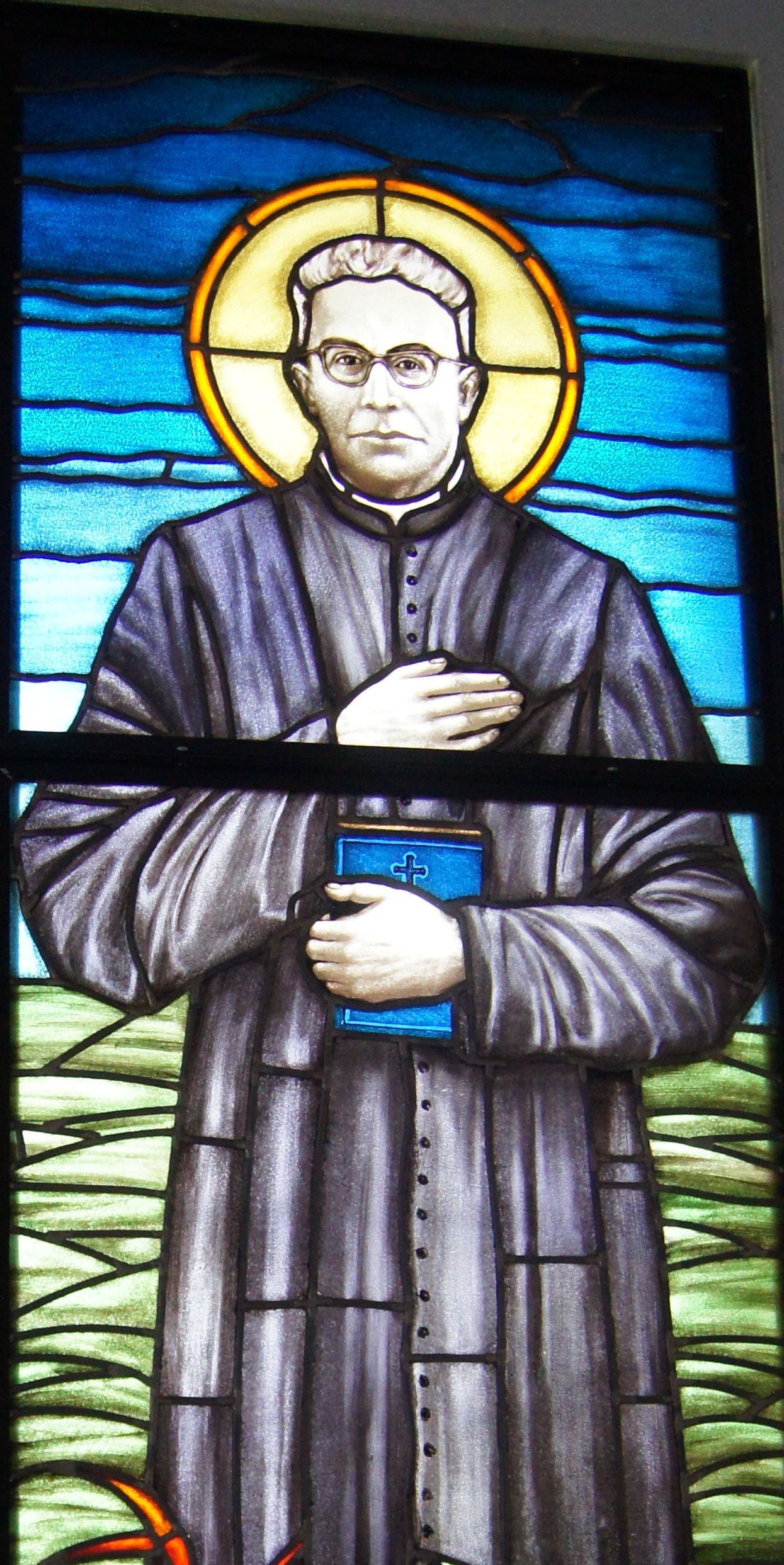
- Stained glass window.

Martyr
- Born: 13 December 1907; Krościenko Niżne, Podkarpackie, Vistula Land
- Died: 21 August 1964 (aged 56); Nowy Żmigród, Podkarpackie, Polish People's Republic
- Venerated in: Roman Catholic Church
- Beatified: 19 June 2005, Pilsudski Square, Warsaw, Poland by Cardinal Józef Glemp
- Feast: 23 August
- Attributes: Book of the hours

Władysław Findysz (13 December 1907 - 21 August 1964) was a Polish priest of the Roman Catholic Church. He was imprisoned under the Communist regime in 1963 until not too long before his death on the charges of sending religious newsletters to his parishioners. He was beatified under Pope Benedict XVI on 19 June 2005.

== Life ==
Władysław Findysz was born on 13 December 1907 to Stanisław Findysz and Apollonia Rachwal and he was baptized the day after in the local parish church. His early education was overseen by the Felician Sisters while he later joined the Marian Solidarity movement as a young student. His studies concluded in 1919.

Findysz entered the major seminary in Przemyśl in the autumn of 1927 where he was a spiritual student of Jan Wojciech Balicki; he was later ordained to the priesthood on 19 June 1932 before being appointed as the assistant parish priest at Borysław on 1 August 1932 while remaining there until 17 September 1935 when he assumed the duties of an assistant parish priest at Drohobych. Father Findysz was stationed there until 1 August 1937 when he was reassigned to Strzyżów until 10 October 1940 when he was appointed to Jasło. He later was made the parish administrator and parish priest at Nowy Żmigród on 8 July 1941. On 3 October 1944 he and many others were expelled from the town due to the retreating Nazi army and he later returned on 23 January 1945 in order to rebuild his damaged parish while also caring for the refugees and displaced peoples; he also saved several Greek Catholic families that the Communists began to persecute and exile while from 1946 until his death he was observed by the secret police's surveillance officials. He was made an honorary canon in 1946 due to his good works.

He was ordered to stop teaching catechism in 1952 and was ordered to live outside of his parish on two occasions in 1952 and 1954 in an attempt by the Communists to hinder his work. He was made vice-dean of the Nowy Żmigród deanery in 1957 and was later appointed as its dean in 1962. In 1963 he established the Conciliar Works of Charity. On 25 November 1963 he was arrested and jailed two months after he had surgery to remove a thyroid gland; his show trial on 16 and 17 December 1963 saw him sentenced for 30 months for the crime of "forcing" religion on people in the area. Father Findysz was transferred to a prison hospital on 25 January 1964 where he suffered from esophageal cancer though surgery was postponed and he was left to suffer before his release on 29 February. By this stage the tumors were deemed to be inoperable and so he was forced to live in pain until his death a few months later. He was admitted to hospital in April 1964 to see a specialist who advised against surgery.

The priest died on 21 August 1964 in the morning due to his cancer and was buried that same day. A total of 130 priests attended his funeral.

== Beatification ==
The beatification process was authorized to commence on 23 May 2000 after the Congregation for the Causes of Saints issued the official "nihil obstat" to the cause and titled him as a Servant of God as the first official stage in the process. Pope John Paul II approved the beatification after he confirmed that the late priest died "in odium fidei" (in hatred of the faith) and scheduled the beatification for 24 April 2005 in Rome. This was suspended after the pope died in 2005 and so Pope Benedict XVI delegated Cardinal Józef Glemp to preside the celebration on 19 June 2005 in Warsaw. Findysz's cause was the first successful a martyr under the Communist persecution of Poland. The current postulator for this cause is Piotr Tarnawski.
