= Antonia Maria Verna =

Italian Roman Catholic religious sister

Blessed Antonia Maria Verna

Virgin
- Born: 12 June 1773; Pasquaro di Rivarolo Canavese, Turin, Kingdom of Sardinia
- Died: 25 December 1838 (aged 65); Rivarolo Canavese, Turin, Kingdom of Sardinia
- Venerated in: Roman Catholic Church
- Beatified: 2 October 2011, Ivrea, Turin, Italy by Cardinal Tarcisio Bertone
- Feast: 12 June

Antonia Maria Verna (12 June 1773 – 25 December 1838) was an Italian Roman Catholic religious sister and the founder of the Suore di carità dell'Immacolata Concezione. Verna left her hometown when she was fifteen due to increasing offers of marriage (which she did not want to accept) and returned sometime later when she decided to pursue her religious vocation. Her emphasis was on catechism and founded her religious congregation to better teach catechism to children as well as to tend to ill people.

Her beatification process launched after her death in the 1930s and she was titled as a Servant of God while the confirmation of her life of heroic virtue enabled for her to be titled as venerable on 19 December 2009. Pope Benedict XVI approved a miracle attributed to her intercession which would allow for Verna's beatification; Cardinal Tarcisio Bertone presided over her beatification in 2011 on the pope's behalf.

== Life ==
Antonia Maria Verna was born in Pasquaro, village close to Rivarolo Canavese, on 12 June 1773 to the poor peasants Guglielmo Verna (1743-24.3.1798) and Domenica Maria Vacheri (b. 1748) as the second of three children (her parents were married on 24 January 1759); her baptism was celebrated mere hours after her birth in the San Giacomo in Rivarolo church. Her siblings were Michele Domenico (b. 12 October 1769; died some months after his birth) and Michele Andrea Verna (b. 30 November 1775). Her paternal uncle was Giovanni Ludovico and her paternal aunts were Domenica Maria and Maria Maddalena. Her maternal grandparents were Michele Vacheri and Francesca Maria Meaglia. Verna cultivated her deep religious calling as a child (which came from her mother who was responsible for her religious upbringing) and intensified her devotion to Saint Joseph whom she elected as her special patron. Verna also had a devotion to the Child Jesus. Her father died in 1798 following a sudden but brief illness.

In her adolescence she began to feel a call to religious life and began to teach catechism to the children in her village while attending the Institute of San Giorgio Canavese as a student. It was when she turned fifteen in 1788 that she began to open herself to whatever God would want of her; her parents wanted her to find a husband but she announced her intention to consecrate herself to God (she also made a private vow to remain chaste). But she did have several suitors and to that end left her hometown to leave behind potential marriage prospects. Verna did not return to her hometown until 1789.

In 1806 she established a small group that would soon become her new religious congregation. Their aim was to teach and catechize to children as well as care for those who were ill in their own homes. Their first home opened in 1819 and King Charles Felix granted secular approval to the order on 7 March 1828. The local bishop granted his diocesan approval to this institute on 10 June 1828.

Verna died on Christmas morning in 1838 at 10:00 am after experiencing a brief illness (spouting from cardiovascular complications) and her remains were interred in the basement below her parish church. In 2005 her order had 928 religious in 111 houses in places such as Lebanon and Switzerland.

== Beatification ==
The beatification process opened in Ivrea on 6 April 1937 which granted her the title Servant of God. Theologians also approved of her writings in a decree issued on 28 May 1941. The local process closed on 20 March 1939 and received validation from the Congregation for the Causes of Saints on 10 July 1992. The Positio dossier – documentation attesting to her reputation for holiness – was submitted to the C.C.S. in Rome in 1999. Historians approved the cause on 23 May 2000 as did theologians on 20 February 2009 and the C.C.S. members several months later on 17 November. Pope Benedict XVI – in a decree – confirmed that Verna had lived a model life of heroic virtue on 19 December 2009 and proclaimed her to be Venerable.

The miracle needed for her beatification was investigated in Chur from 24 May to 1 June 1966 and received formal validation from the C.C.S. on 27 May 1994. Medical experts confirmed the miraculous nature of this healing on 4 March 2010 and theologians confirmed it happened as a result of Verna's intercession on 15 July 2010. The C.C.S. ruled the case to be a miracle on 14 December 2010 and would bring it to the pope for final approval. Benedict XVI approved of it on 14 January 2011 and delegated Cardinal Tarcisio Bertone to celebrate her beatification on 2 October 2011 in Turin.

The current postulator for this cause is Giovangiuseppe Califano.
