= Litér =

- Flag Coat of arms

- Location of Litér in Hungary
- Coordinates: 47.0994°N 18.0065°E
- Country: Hungary
- Region: Central Transdanubia
- County: Veszprém

Area
  - Total: 12.83 km^{2} (4.95 sq mi)

Population (2012)
  - Total: 2,044
  - Density: 159.3/km^{2} (412.6/sq mi)
- Time zone: UTC+1 (CET)
  - Summer (DST): UTC+2 (CEST)
- Postal code: 8196
- Area code: +36 88
- Website: http://www.liter.hu/

Litér is a village in Veszprém county, Hungary.
