= Hugh of Bonnevaux =

Hugh (c. 1120–1194) was a Cistercian monk and the fourth abbot of Bonnevaux Abbey from 1166.

Hugh was born at Châteauneuf-sur-Isère around 1120 to the pious family that held the castle there. His grandfather, Odilo, became a monk of the Grande Chartreuse. His uncle was Bishop Hugh of Grenoble and an aunt was the first abbess of Vernaison. He was educated under another uncle, the abbot of Saint-Just in Lyon, from which he secretly fled to the Cistercian abbey of Miroir. This was opposed by his family, but he received a letter of support from Bernard of Clairvaux. He was about sixteen years old at the time. Hugh spent his novitiate at Miroir. He finally professed as a monk at the abbey of Léoncel, whose abbot was another relative.

Hugh was a monk of Léoncel for twenty-three years before being elected its abbot in 1162. He received the abbatial blessing from Pope Alexander III, who was visiting Montpellier at the time. He was by then widely revered for his sanctity and admired for his preaching. He was not a great scholar, but he did purchase devotional books for his monastery. In 1166, he was elected abbot of Bonnevaux.

Following the death of Archbishop Peter II of Tarentaise in 1175, Hugh took a leading role in resolving the schism between Pope Alexander III and Antipope Callistus III, sponsored by the Emperor Frederick Barbarossa. In two letters from August 1176, Barbarossa thanked Hugh for his advice on healing the schism and invited him to participate in discussions scheduled to take place in Italy in September. According to Romuald of Salerno, Barbarossa sent Hugh and Bishop Pons of Clermont as part of a delegation to Alexander at Venice. According to the Historia ducum Venetorum, they also acted as representatives of Kings Louis VII of France and Henry II of England, which gave them added clout. After the Treaty of Venice between Alexander and Barbarossa in July 1177, both the pope and the emperor expressed gratitude to Hugh in letters addressed to the Cistercian order. The Historia ducum lists Pons and Hugh at the head of its list of those present at the formal reconciliation.

During his abbacy, Hugh founded three daughter houses: Sylveréal (1173), Valbenoîte (1184) and Valcroissant (1188). He was around seventy years old when he died in 1194. His feast day, April 1, was at first celebrated throughout the Cistercian order, but by the seventeenth century it was restricted to Bonnevaux. There is no record of a formal canonization, but the Holy See recognized him as a saint in 1702. A liturgy for the celebration of his feast from 1473 has been published. His relics were lost when the abbey was sacked during the French Wars of Religion in 1576.

An anonymous Vita sancti Hugonis (Life of Saint Hugh) was written in Latin at Bonnevaux in the thirteenth century. Helinand of Froidmont included a brief biography of Hugh in his Chronicle. This was incorporated into the Speculum historiale of Vincent of Beauvais, which in turn was copied into the Legendarium magnum Bodecense. Helinand mistakenly identified Hugh's first monastery as Maizières.

== Sources ==
- Dimier, M. A. [in French] (1939). "La Vita Hugonis". Collectanea cisterciensia. 6: 214–218.
- Dimier, M. A. (1958). "Un office rimé de saint Hugues de Bonnevaux". Revue bénédictine. 68 (3–4): 265–280. doi:10.1484/J.RB.4.01479.
- Dimier, M. A. (2003). "Hugh Bonnevaux, St.". New Catholic Encyclopedia. Vol. 7: Hol–Jub (2nd ed.). Farmington Hills, MI: Gale. p. 149.
- Freed, John B. (2016). Frederick Barbarossa: The Prince and the Myth. Yale University Press.
- Merton, Thomas (2013). In the Valley of Wormwood: Cistercian Blessed and Saints of the Golden Age. Liturgical Press.
- Woesthuis, M. M. (1987). "The Origins of Anonymus Primus: Vincent of Beauvais, Helinand of Froidmont and the Life of St Hugh of Cluny". Analecta Bollandiana. 105 (3–4): 385–411. doi:10.1484/j.abol.4.03210.
