= List of people beatified by Pope Paul VI =

This is a list of all the individuals that had been beatified by Pope Paul VI (r. 1963–1978) in his pontificate. The pope beatified 62 individuals.

No.	Blessed	Date of Beatification	Place of Beatification
1.	John Nepomucene Neumann^{2}	13 October 1963	Saint Peter's Basilica, Vatican City
2.	Domenico Giovanni Barberi	27 October 1963	Saint Peter's Basilica, Vatican City
3.	Leonardo Murialdo^{1}	3 November 1963	Saint Peter's Basilica, Vatican City
4.	Vincenzo Romano^{22}	17 November 1963	Saint Peter's Basilica, Vatican City
5.	Nunzio Sulprizio^{22}	1 December 1963	Saint Peter's Basilica, Vatican City
6.	Luigi Guanella^{19}	25 October 1964	Saint Peter's Basilica, Vatican City
7.	Jacques Berthieu^{20}	17 October 1965	Saint Peter's Basilica, Vatican City
8.	Charbel Makhluf^{3}	5 December 1965	Saint Peter's Basilica, Vatican City
9.	Ignatius of Santhià^{16}	17 April 1966	Saint Peter's Basilica, Vatican City
10.	Maria Fortunata Viti	8 October 1967	Saint Peter's Basilica, Vatican City
11.	24 Martyrs of Korea^{6}	6 October 1968	Saint Peter's Basilica, Vatican City
12.	Maria Therese von Wüllenweber	13 October 1968	Saint Peter's Basilica, Vatican City
13.	Clelia Barbieri^{10}	27 October 1968	Saint Peter's Basilica, Vatican City
14.	Maximilian Kolbe^{4}	17 October 1971	Saint Peter's Basilica, Vatican City
15.	Michael Rua	29 October 1972	Saint Peter's Square, Vatican City
16.	Agostina Livia Pietrantoni^{15}	12 November 1972	Saint Peter's Square, Vatican City
17.	Liborius Wagner	24 March 1974	Saint Peter's Basilica, Vatican City
18.	Maria Franziska Schervier	28 April 1974	Saint Peter's Basilica, Vatican City
19.	Marie-Eugénie de Jésus^{18}	9 February 1975	Saint Peter's Square, Vatican City
20.	Cesar de Bus^{23}	27 April 1975	Saint Peter's Basilica, Vatican City
21.	Charles Steeb	6 July 1975	Saint Peter's Square, Vatican City
22.	Joseph Freinademetz^{17}	19 October 1975	Saint Peter's Basilica, Vatican City
23.	Mary Theresa Ledóchowska	19 October 1975	Saint Peter's Basilica, Vatican City
24.	Arnold Janssen^{17}	19 October 1975	Saint Peter's Basilica, Vatican City
25.	Eugène de Mazenod^{14}	19 October 1975	Saint Peter's Basilica, Vatican City
26.	Ezequiél Moreno y Díaz^{13}	1 November 1975	Saint Peter's Square, Vatican City
27.	Gaspare Luigi Bertoni^{11}	1 November 1975	Saint Peter's Square, Vatican City
28.	Mary of the Divine Heart	1 November 1975	Saint Peter's Square, Vatican City
29.	Giovanna Francesca Michelotti	1 November 1975	Saint Peter's Square, Vatican City
30.	Vincenzo Grossi^{21}	1 November 1975	Saint Peter's Square, Vatican City
31.	Giuseppe Moscati^{8}	16 November 1975	Saint Peter's Basilica, Vatican City
32.	Leopold Mandić^{5}	2 May 1976	Saint Peter's Basilica, Vatican City
33.	María de Jesús López Rivas	14 November 1976	Saint Peter's Square, Vatican City
34.	Rosa Francisca Dolors Molas Vallvé^{9}	1 May 1977	Saint Peter's Basilica, Vatican City
35.	Miguel Febres Cordero^{7}	30 October 1977	Saint Peter's Basilica, Vatican City
36.	Mutien-Marie Wiaux^{12}	30 October 1977	Saint Peter's Basilica, Vatican City
37.	Maria Katharina Kasper^{22}	16 April 1978	Saint Peter's Square, Vatican City
38.	Caterina Dominici	7 May 1978	Saint Peter's Square, Vatican City

== See also ==
- List of people beatified by Pope John XXIII
- List of people beatified by Pope John Paul II
- List of people beatified by Pope Benedict XVI
- List of people beatified by Pope Francis
- List of people beatified by Pope Leo XIV

== Notes ==
^1 Later canonized on 3 May 1970.
^2 Later canonized on 19 June 1977.
^3 Later canonized on 9 October 1977.
^4 Later canonized on 10 October 1982.
^5 Later canonized on 16 October 1983.
^6 Later canonized on 6 May 1984.
^7 Later canonized on 21 October 1984.
^8 Later canonized on 25 October 1987.
^9 Later canonized on 11 December 1988.
^10 Later canonized on 9 April 1989.
^11 Later canonized on 1 November 1989.
^12 Later canonized on 10 December 1989.
^13 Later canonized on 11 October 1992.
^14 Later canonized on 3 December 1995.
^15 Later canonized on 18 April 1999.
^16 Later canonized on 19 May 2002.
^17 Later canonized on 5 October 2003.
^18 Later canonized on 3 June 2007.
^19 Later canonized on 23 October 2011.
^20 Later canonized on 21 October 2012.
^21 Later canonized on 18 October 2015.
^22 Later canonized on 14 October 2018.
^23 Later canonized on 15 May 2022.
