= Charles Steeb =

German priest

Blessed Charles Steeb
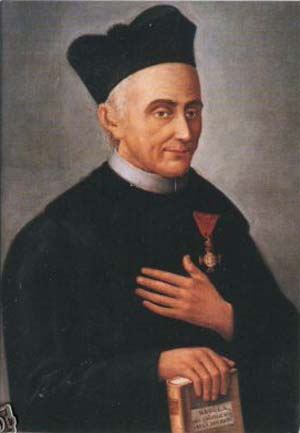
- c. 1850

Priest
- Born: 18 December 1773; Tübingen, Baden-Württemberg, Duchy of Württemberg
- Died: 15 December 1856 (aged 82); Verona, Kingdom of Lombardy–Venetia
- Venerated in: Roman Catholic Church
- Beatified: 6 July 1975, Saint Peter's Square, Vatican City by Pope Paul VI
- Feast: 15 December
- Attributes: Medal; Book; Priest's cassock
- Patronage: Sisters of Mercy of Verona

Charles Steeb (18 December 1773 – 15 December 1856) was a German Catholic priest who cofounded the Sisters of Mercy of Verona. Pope Paul VI beatified him in 1975 after the recognition of a miracle attributed to his intercession.

== Life ==
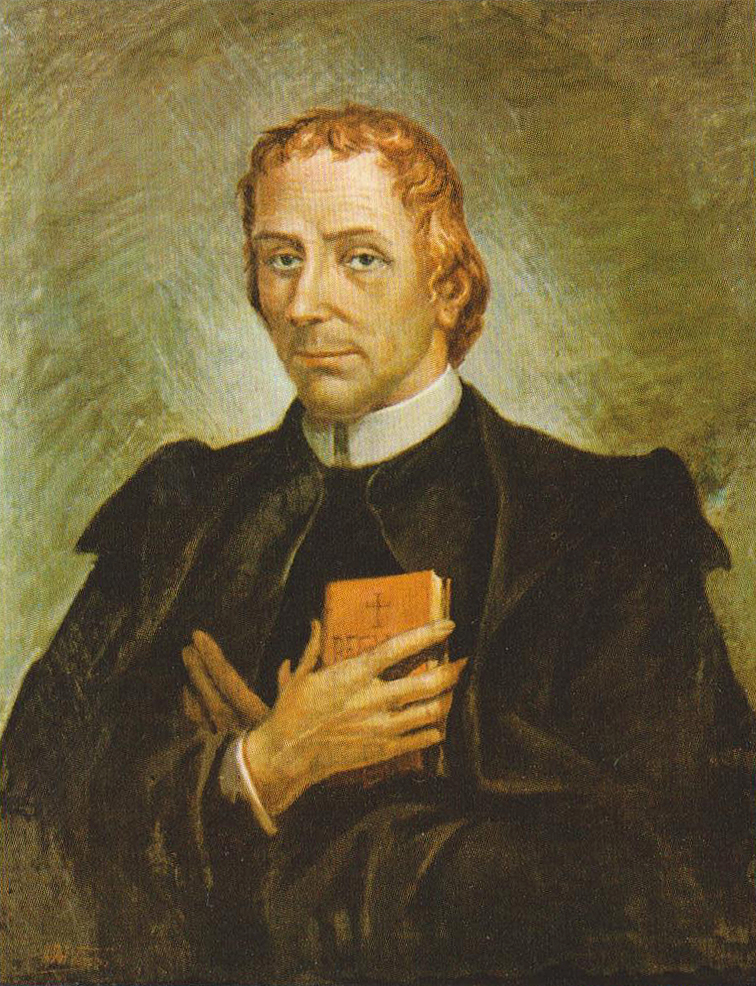
Steeb c. 1820.

Charles Steeb was born in Tübingen, Germany, on 18 December 1773 to Lutheran parents. His home, the Hotel Lamm, overlooked the Market Square and was a gathering place for professors, students, and theologians from the nearby university. He traveled to France and studied in Paris as a teenager but fled during the French Revolution. He continued his studies in Verona where contact with Catholic priests led to his conversion in 1792 to Roman Catholicism. His parents disowned him when this was discovered.

In 1796 Steeb was ordained to the priesthood and served in the Lazaretto where he assisted wounded and sick soldiers from the Napoleonic wars. He studied canon law and civil law in Pavia, and later went on to teach languages. He joined the “Evangelical Brotherhood of Priests and Laymen” founded by Fr. Peter Leopardi and devoted himself to the poor received in the city shelter and to the inmates of the Civil Hospital. He was particularly devoted to Mary, under the title "Mother of Mercy". In 1840 he founded the Sisters of Mercy of Verona.

He died December 15, 1856.

== Veneration ==
Preliminary work for Steeb's cause began in 1949, and theologians approved his spiritual writings on 25 January 1952. The cause for his sainthood was opened on 6 July 1963. Pope Paul VI recognized his life of heroic virtue and named him to be Venerable on 19 November 1970, and later beatified him on 6 July 1975.

== Roman Martyrology ==
"In Verona in Veneto, in the year 1856, Blessed Charles Steeb, priest. Born in Tübingen in Baden-Würtenberg and of Lutheran faith, he made profession of Catholic faith in Verona and, ordained priest, founded the Institute of the Sisters of Mercy to care for the afflicted, the poor and the sick."
