= Tartanedo =

Tartanedo, Spain
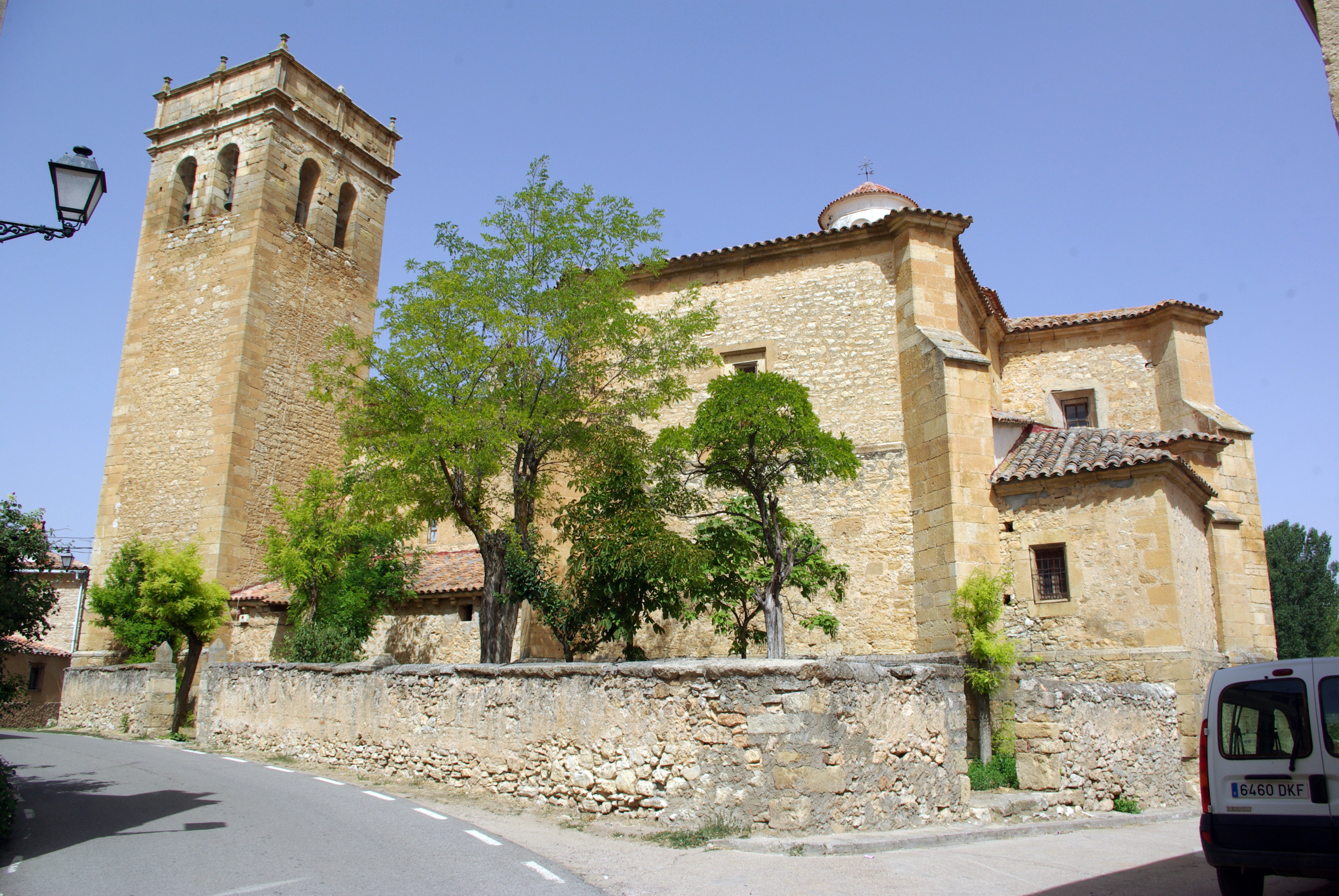

- Location within Province of Guadalajara Location within Castilla-La Mancha Location within Spain
- Coordinates: 40.994167°N 1.922222°W
- Country: Spain
- Autonomous community: Castile-La Mancha
- Province: Guadalajara
- Municipality: Tartanedo

Area
  - Total: 148 km^{2} (57 sq mi)

Population (2025-01-01)
  - Total: 143
  - Density: 0.966/km^{2} (2.50/sq mi)
- Time zone: UTC+1 (CET)
  - Summer (DST): UTC+2 (CEST)

Tartanedo is a municipality located in the province of Guadalajara, Castile-La Mancha, Spain. According to the 2004 census (INE), the municipality has a population of 174 inhabitants.
