= Huércal-Overa =

Huércal-Overa, Spain
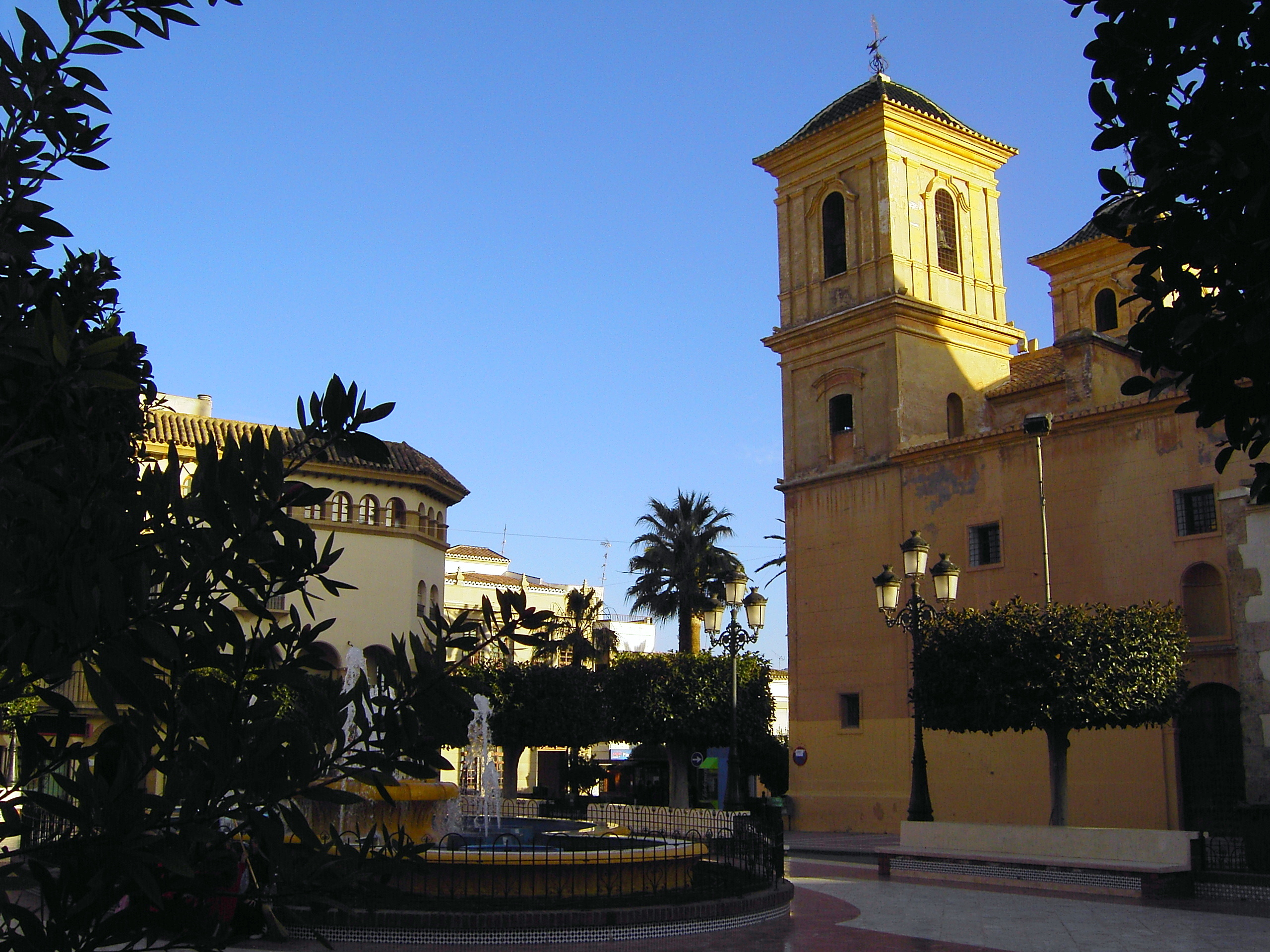
- View of Huércal-Overa

- Flag Coat of arms
- Interactive map of Huércal-Overa, Spain
- Coordinates: 37°23′N 1°56′W
- Country: Spain
- Community: Andalusia
- Municipality: Almería

Government
  - Mayor: Diego Fernandez (PP)

Area
  - Total: 318 km^{2} (123 sq mi)
- Elevation: 280 m (920 ft)

Population (2025-01-01)
  - Total: 20,860
  - Density: 65.6/km^{2} (170/sq mi)
- Time zone: UTC+1 (CET)
  - Summer (DST): UTC+2 (CEST)

Huércal-Overa is a town and a municipality of Almería province, in the autonomous community of Andalusia, Spain, located near the border with the province of Murcia. It is the largest municipality in the comarca of Levante Almeriense. The population of Huércal-Overa in 2018 was 18,816. Huércal-Overa is situated in the Valley of Almanzora and has a primarily agriculturally-driven economy. It celebrates its yearly fair on the 3rd weekend of October.

== Demographics ==
Historical population
Year	Pop.	±%
1900	15,763	—
1999	13,870	−12.0%
2000	13,999	+0.9%
2001	14,293	+2.1%
2002	14,672	+2.7%
2003	15,059	+2.6%
2004	15,540	+3.2%
2005	16,156	+4.0%
2006	16,170	+0.1%
2007	16,360	+1.2%
2008	16,834	+2.9%
2009	17,645	+4.8%
2010	18,278	+3.6%
2011	18,580	+1.7%
2012	18,686	+0.6%
2013	18,925	+1.3%
2014	18,374	−2.9%
2015	18,530	+0.8%
2016	18,589	+0.3%
2017	18,649	+0.3%
2018	18,816	+0.9%
2019	19,127	+1.7%
2020	19,432	+1.6%
2021	19,744	+1.6%
2022	20,093	+1.8%
2023	20,425	+1.7%
2024	20,609	+0.9%
Source: "Huércal Overa" . Encyclopædia Britannica. Vol. 13 (11th ed.). 1911. p. 854. and INE (Spain)

== Climate ==
Huércal-Overa has a cold desert climate (Köppen climate classification: BWk) closely bordering on a hot desert climate (Köppen: BWh) with mild, moderately dry winters and hot, dry summers. As well as several regions of the province of Almería, Huércal-Overa has very low annual rainfall, often below 250 millimetres (9.8 in) with most precipitation occurring during the autumn.

Climate data for Huércal-Overa (2005–2024), extremes (2001-present)
Month	Jan	Feb	Mar	Apr	May	Jun	Jul	Aug	Sep	Oct	Nov	Dec	Year
Record high °C (°F)	28.0 (82.4)	28.4 (83.1)	32.5 (90.5)	34.5 (94.1)	37.4 (99.3)	41.5 (106.7)	44.0 (111.2)	42.6 (108.7)	39.4 (102.9)	35.3 (95.5)	30.2 (86.4)	29.4 (84.9)	44.0 (111.2)
Mean daily maximum °C (°F)	16.9 (62.4)	17.3 (63.1)	19.4 (66.9)	21.6 (70.9)	25.1 (77.2)	29.2 (84.6)	32.3 (90.1)	32.2 (90.0)	28.7 (83.7)	24.6 (76.3)	20.0 (68.0)	17.7 (63.9)	23.7 (74.8)
Daily mean °C (°F)	10.9 (51.6)	11.5 (52.7)	13.6 (56.5)	15.8 (60.4)	19.1 (66.4)	23.1 (73.6)	26.2 (79.2)	26.2 (79.2)	22.8 (73.0)	18.7 (65.7)	14.3 (57.7)	11.7 (53.1)	17.8 (64.1)
Mean daily minimum °C (°F)	4.9 (40.8)	5.7 (42.3)	7.8 (46.0)	10.0 (50.0)	13.1 (55.6)	17.1 (62.8)	20.0 (68.0)	20.2 (68.4)	16.9 (62.4)	12.9 (55.2)	8.7 (47.7)	5.7 (42.3)	11.9 (53.5)
Record low °C (°F)	−3.6 (25.5)	−4.8 (23.4)	−0.6 (30.9)	2.8 (37.0)	4.2 (39.6)	10.2 (50.4)	14.5 (58.1)	10.5 (50.9)	8.1 (46.6)	3.5 (38.3)	0.0 (32.0)	−3.1 (26.4)	−4.8 (23.4)
Average precipitation mm (inches)	29.5 (1.16)	9.8 (0.39)	28.9 (1.14)	26.0 (1.02)	16.4 (0.65)	6.7 (0.26)	3.3 (0.13)	6.8 (0.27)	48.7 (1.92)	14.6 (0.57)	23.8 (0.94)	19.7 (0.78)	234.2 (9.23)
Source: Agencia Estatal de Meteorologia

== See also ==
- List of municipalities in Almería
