= Jauru =

Coordinates: 15.3419°S 58.8658°W

Jauru MT
- Municipality
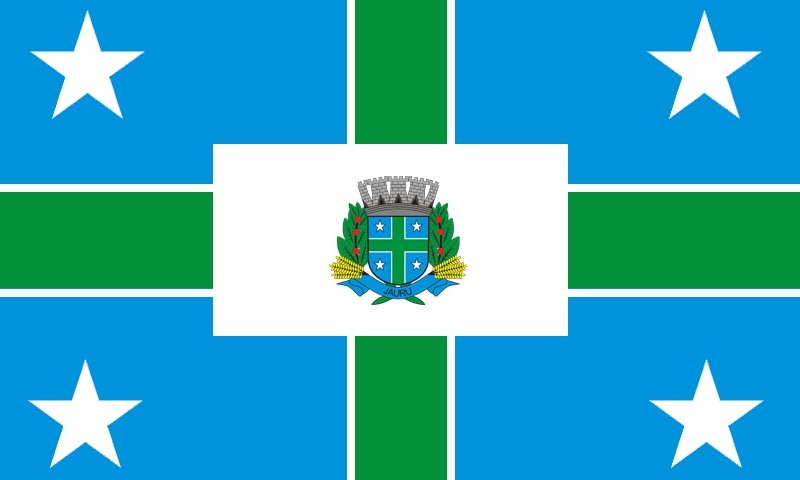
- Flag

- Country: Brazil
- Region: Center-West
- State: Mato Grosso
- Mesoregion: Sudoeste Mato-Grossense

Area
  - Total: 0.470072 sq mi (1.217480 km^{2})

Population (2020)
  - Total: 8,582
  - Density: 20.8/sq mi (8.03/km^{2})
- Time zone: UTC−3 (BRT)

Jauru is a municipality in the state of Mato Grosso in the Central-West Region of Brazil.

== Climate ==
Jauro has a tropical savanna climate (Köppen climate classification: Aw).

== History ==
During the time of the former Captaincy of Mato Grosso, there was intense activity on the Jauru River because it was one of the rivers that served as a transportation route to the former Mato Grosso capital of Vila Bela da Santíssima Trindade. This river was one of the concrete and best-defined boundaries between the Viceroyalty of the Río de la Plata (Spanish) and Portuguese Brazil. A significant masonry boundary marker was erected for this purpose, the location of which is now entirely within Brazilian territory. After 1811, and at least until the end of Gaspar Rodríguez de Francia's administration, the former boundary of the viceroyalty was maintained by the Republic of Paraguay, but the Brazilian state contested the previous agreements. In any case, Paraguayan claims were maintained until 1870.

== See also ==
- List of municipalities in Mato Grosso
