= List of people beatified by Pope John XXIII =

This is a list of all the individuals that had been beatified by Pope John XXIII (r. 1958–1963) in his pontificate. The pope beatified 5 individuals.

No.	Blessed	Date of Beatification	Place of Beatification
1.	Elena Guerra^{4}	26 April 1959	Saint Peter's Basilica, Vatican City
2.	Marie Marguerite d'Youville^{2}	3 May 1959	Saint Peter's Basilica, Vatican City
3.	Innocenzo da Berzo	12 November 1961	Saint Peter's Basilica, Vatican City
4.	Elizabeth Ann Seton^{1}	17 March 1963	Saint Peter's Basilica, Vatican City
5.	Luigi Maria Palazzolo^{3}	19 March 1963	Saint Peter's Basilica, Vatican City

== See also ==
- Beatifications of Pope Pius XII
- List of people beatified by Pope Paul VI
- List of people beatified by Pope John Paul II
- List of people beatified by Pope Benedict XVI
- List of people beatified by Pope Francis
- List of people beatified by Pope Leo XIV

== Notes ==
^1 Later canonized on 14 September 1975.
^2 Later canonized on 9 December 1990.
^3 Later canonized on 15 May 2022.
^4 Later canonized in 20 October 2024.
