= Beatification =

Recognition by the Catholic Church of a holy person

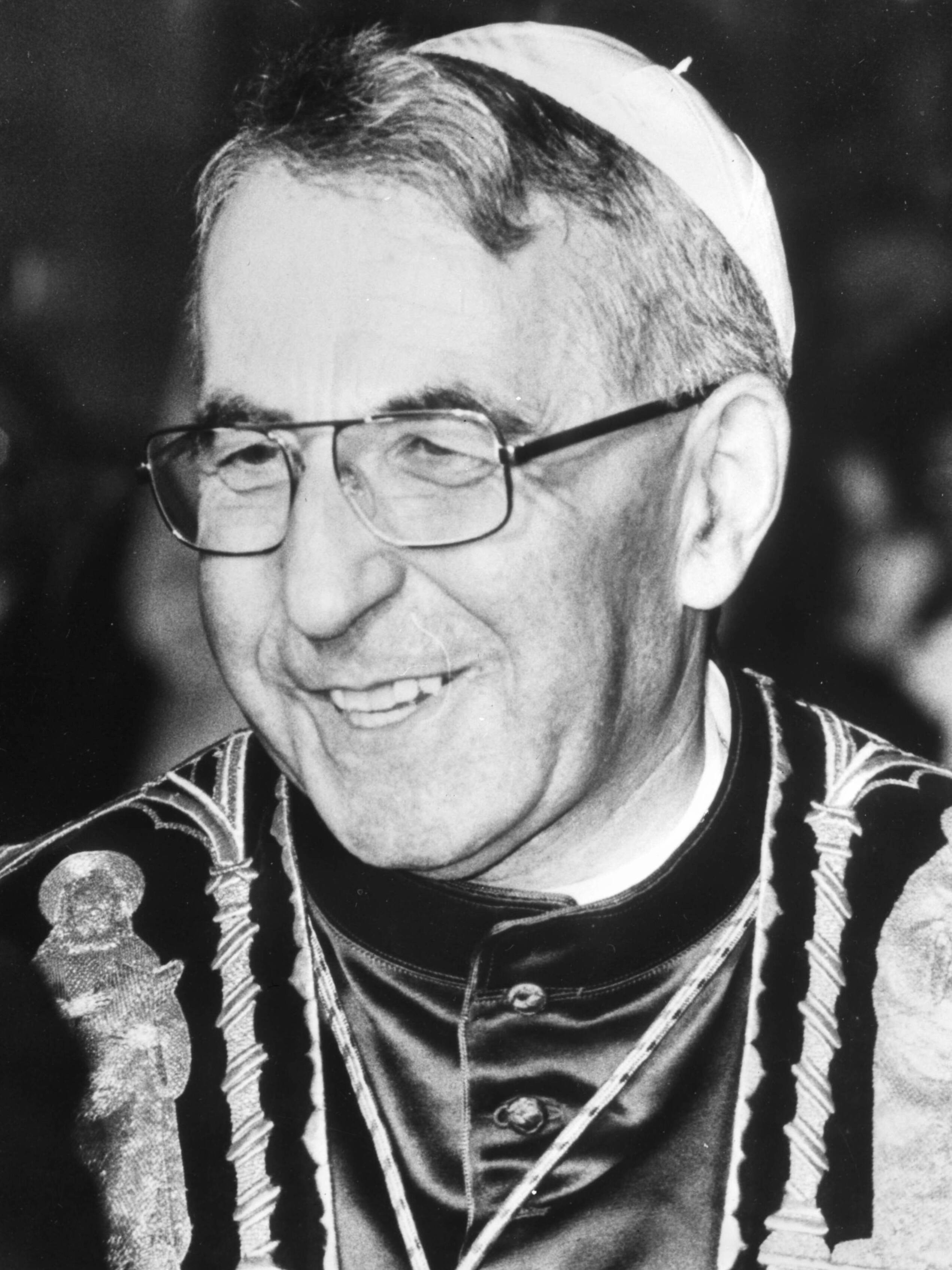
Pope John Paul I (1912–1978), beatified on 4 September 2022 by Pope Francis. He is the most recent pontiff to be beatified.

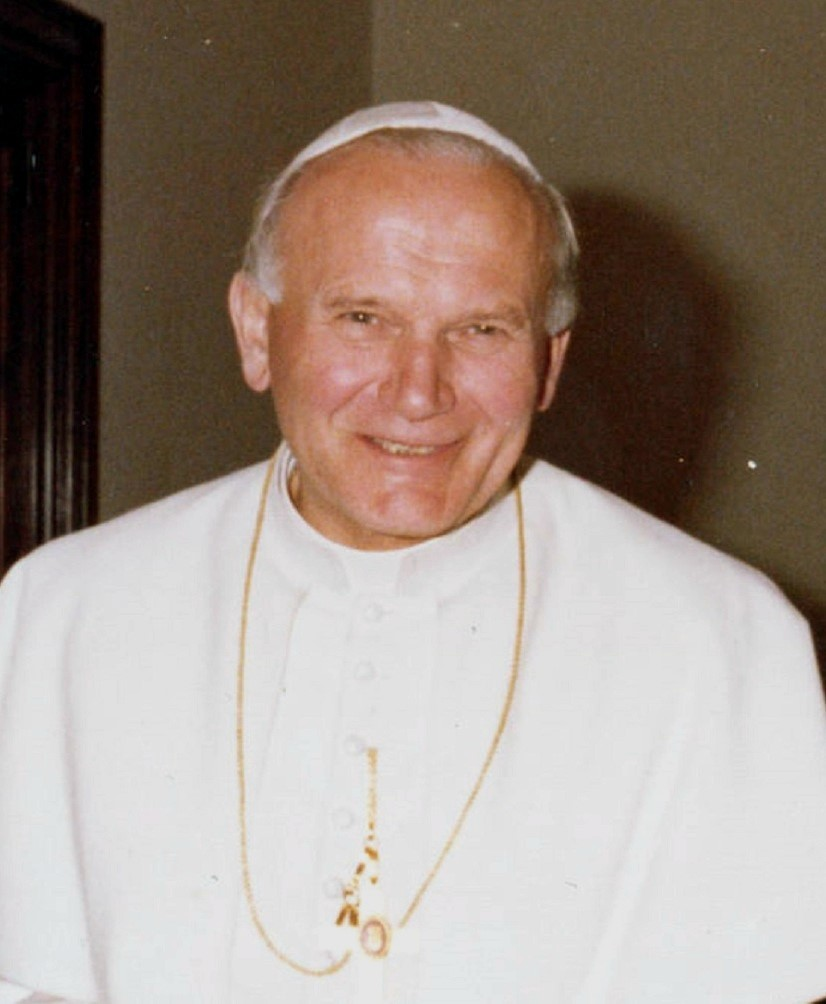
Pope John Paul II beatified more people than all his predecessors had during the previous 400 years, and was himself beatified in 2011.

Beatification (from Latin beatus 'blessed' and facere 'to make') is an act by which the Catholic Church formally recognizes that a deceased member of the faithful is believed to have entered Heaven and is capable of interceding on behalf of individuals who pray in their name, permitting a restricted, local form of public veneration.

Unlike canonization, which most Catholic theologians hold to be a final and infallible act of the papal magisterium, beatification is generally regarded as a fallible and provisional judgment, and the veneration it permits is confined to a particular diocese, country, or religious institute rather than extended to the universal Church.

Beati is the plural form, referring to those who have undergone the process of beatification; they possess the title of "Blessed" (/ˈblɛsɪd/) (abbreviation "Bl.") before their names and are often referred to in English as "a Blessed" or, plurally, "Blesseds".

Blesseds are venerated regionally, saints by the entire universal Church.

== History ==
Local bishops had the power of beatifying until 1634, when Pope Urban VIII, in the apostolic constitution Cœlestis Jerusalem of 6 July, reserved the power of beatifying to the Holy See.

Since the reforms of 1983, as a rule, (for non-martyred Venerables) one miracle must be confirmed to have taken place through the intercession of the person to be beatified. Miracles are almost always unexplainable medical healings, and are scientifically investigated by commissions comprising physicians and theologians.

The requirement of a miracle for beatification is waived in the case of someone whose martyrdom is formally declared by the church.

The feast day for a beatified person is not universal, but is celebrated only by territories, religious institutes, or communities in which the person receives particular veneration. For instance, Kateri Tekakwitha's liturgical feast was celebrated in the United States and Canada when she was declared Blessed. John Duns Scotus was venerated among the Franciscans, in the Archdiocese of Cologne and other places.

The Blessed, elected by popular acclamation (the vox populi) enjoyed local veneration. While the procedure of canonization was taken in hand from the twelfth century by the papacy in Rome, that of beatification continued on a local scale until the thirteenth century before settling at the Council of Trent, which reserved to the pope the right to say who could be venerated.

== Theological status ==
Catholic canonists and theologians have long distinguished the juridical and theological weight of beatification from that of canonization. The distinction is most fully worked out in Pope Benedict XIV's eighteenth-century treatise De Servorum Dei Beatificatione et Beatorum Canonizatione, which remains the classical reference on the subject and was written partly before and partly after Benedict became pope.

Canonization is a universal precept; the pope, acting for the whole Church, declares that a person is in heaven and orders that the person's memory be venerated by Catholics everywhere. Because this final judgment is thought to bind the whole Church in a matter connected to faith and morals, most theologians historically classified canonization as an exercise of papal infallibility, among them Antoninus of Florence, Melchor Cano, Francisco Suárez, Robert Bellarmine, and Domingo Báñez, along with canonists such as González Téllez, Fagnanus, and Schmalzgrüber.

By contrast beatification is treated as a permission rather than a command, and it ordinarily extends only to a particular diocese, country, or religious institute rather than to the universal Church. The Catholic Encyclopedia, has summarized the common opinion of canonists that decrees of beatification, whether "formal" (following the full judicial process) or "equivalent" (granted on the strength of an ancient, uninterrupted cultus), are not infallible "since it is always a permission. not a command," and because beatification is a preparatory step toward canonization rather than the Church's last word on the matter. A minority of older canonical writers, including the Glossa ordinaria Hostiensis, and Cajetan, had argued for a stronger view of beatification, but the encyclopedia has noted that this position had been generally abandoned by the eighteenth century.

The practical significance of this distinction is disciplinary rather than a judgment on the beatified person's soul. Because a beatification is not considered a final and irreformable act, the Church restricts public veneration of a Blessed to specific communities and permits the case to be revisited if new evidence emerges, whereas a canonization, once pronounced, is treated by the Church as settled and irrevocable. Cardinal Agostino Vallini, then vicar general of Rome, described the difference in similar terms, calling canonization an act in which "papal infallibility is involved" while describing beatification as an "administrative act" that permits, rather than requires, veneration.

Theologians have been careful to note that beatification's lack of infallibility is not equivalent to doubt about the beatified person's salvation. Rather, it reflects the absence of specific conditions, such as finality and an intention to bind the whole Church, that theologians associate with an infallible act. A beatification is generally understood to establish a serious moral certainty, grounded in the Church's investigation of a candidate's virtue or martyrdom and an approved miracle, without amounting to the Church's definitive and unrepeatable word on the matter.

=== Suspended and delayed beatification causes ===
Because beatification is not treated as irrevocable in the way canonization is, the Holy See has, on occasion, suspended or indefinitely postponed a beatification after new information came to light, something that has essentially no parallel among completed canonizations. In 2005, shortly after his election, Pope Benedict XVI suspended the scheduled beatification of the French priest Léon Dehon, founder of the Priests of the Sacred Heart, after historians and Jewish organizations drew attention to antisemitic passages in his writings. A commission was appointed to study the matter and the case remained unresolved for years afterward

Similarly, the beatification of Archbishop Fulton J. Sheen, scheduled for December 2019 after Pope Francis approved a miracle attributed to his intercession, was postponed indefinitely by the Holy See only weeks before the ceremony, at the request of bishops seeking further review of his oversight of clergy assignments while he led the Diocese of Rochester. Sheen's cause resumed several years later, and he was beatified on September 24, 2026, in St. Louis, presided over by Cardinal Luis Antonio Tagle.

A related but distinct adjustment affects the liturgical prominence given to already-canonized saints. In 1969, Pope Paul VI's revision of the General Roman Calendar removed the universal feast days of several saints, including Christopher and Barbara, whose historical basis was judged uncertain. Historian Christopher Bellitto has cautioned that this was a downgrading of liturgical prominence rather than a formal act of "de-sainting," since the individuals affected were not stripped of the title of saint. The episode is nonetheless cited by canonists as evidence that even the honour paid to canonized saints is administered flexibly at the liturgical level, in a way that beatification, being local and permissive by nature, allows even more readily.

== Practices under the popes ==
Pope John Paul II (r. 1978–2005) markedly changed the previous Catholic practice of beatification. He proclaimed more saints and blessed than all his predecessors together since 1588, the year the Congregation for the Causes of Saints was founded. In a statement, John Paul emphasized that he was doing nothing different from what the Second Vatican Council had wanted, which reaffirmed that holiness is the essential note of the Church.

John Paul II's successor, Pope Benedict XVI (2005–2013), personally celebrated the beatification Mass for his predecessor at St. Peter's Basilica on the Second Sunday of Easter, or Divine Mercy Sunday, on 1 May 2011, an event that drew more than one million people.

== See also ==
- Locally venerated saint, a similar concept in Eastern Orthodoxy
- Chronological list of saints and blesseds
- List of saints
- List of venerable people (Catholic)
- List of Servants of God
- List of beatified people
- List of people beatified by Pope Leo XIV
- List of people beatified by Pope Francis
- List of people beatified by Pope Benedict XVI
- List of people beatified by Pope John Paul II
- List of people beatified by Pope Paul VI
- Papal infallibility
