= Saint symbolism: Saints (I–P) =

Attribute identifying a saint in artworks

Saint symbolism has been used from the very beginnings of the religion. Each saint is said to have led an exemplary life and symbols have been used to tell these stories throughout the history of the Church. A number of Christian saints are traditionally represented by a symbol or iconic motif associated with their life, termed an attribute or emblem, in order to identify them. The study of these forms part of iconography in art history. They were particularly used so that the illiterate could recognize a scene, and to give each of the Saints something of a personality in art. They are often carried in the hand by the Saint.

Attributes often vary with either time or geography, especially between Eastern Christianity and the West. Orthodox images more often contained inscriptions with the names of saints, so the Eastern repertoire of attributes is generally smaller than the Western.^{[c]} Many of the most prominent saints, like Saint Peter and Saint John the Evangelist can also be recognised by a distinctive facial type. Some attributes are general, such as the martyr's palm. The use of a symbol in a work of art depicting a Saint reminds people who is being shown and of their story. The following is a list of some of these attributes.

== Saints listed by name ==
Saints (A–H)

Saints (Q–Z)

=== I ===
I
Symbol for Isidore of Seville: beehive, crozier and quill

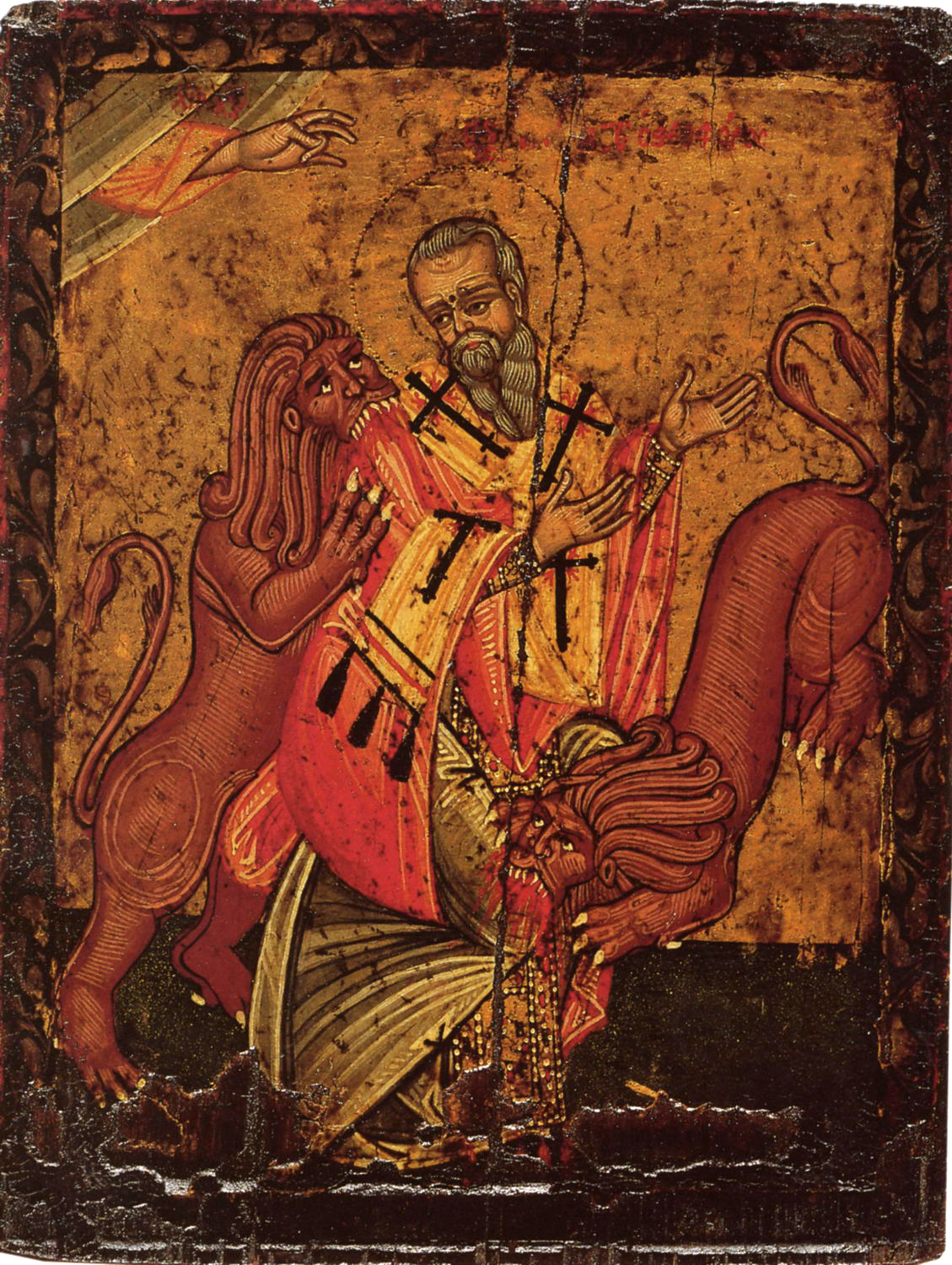
Ignatius of Antioch surrounded by lions

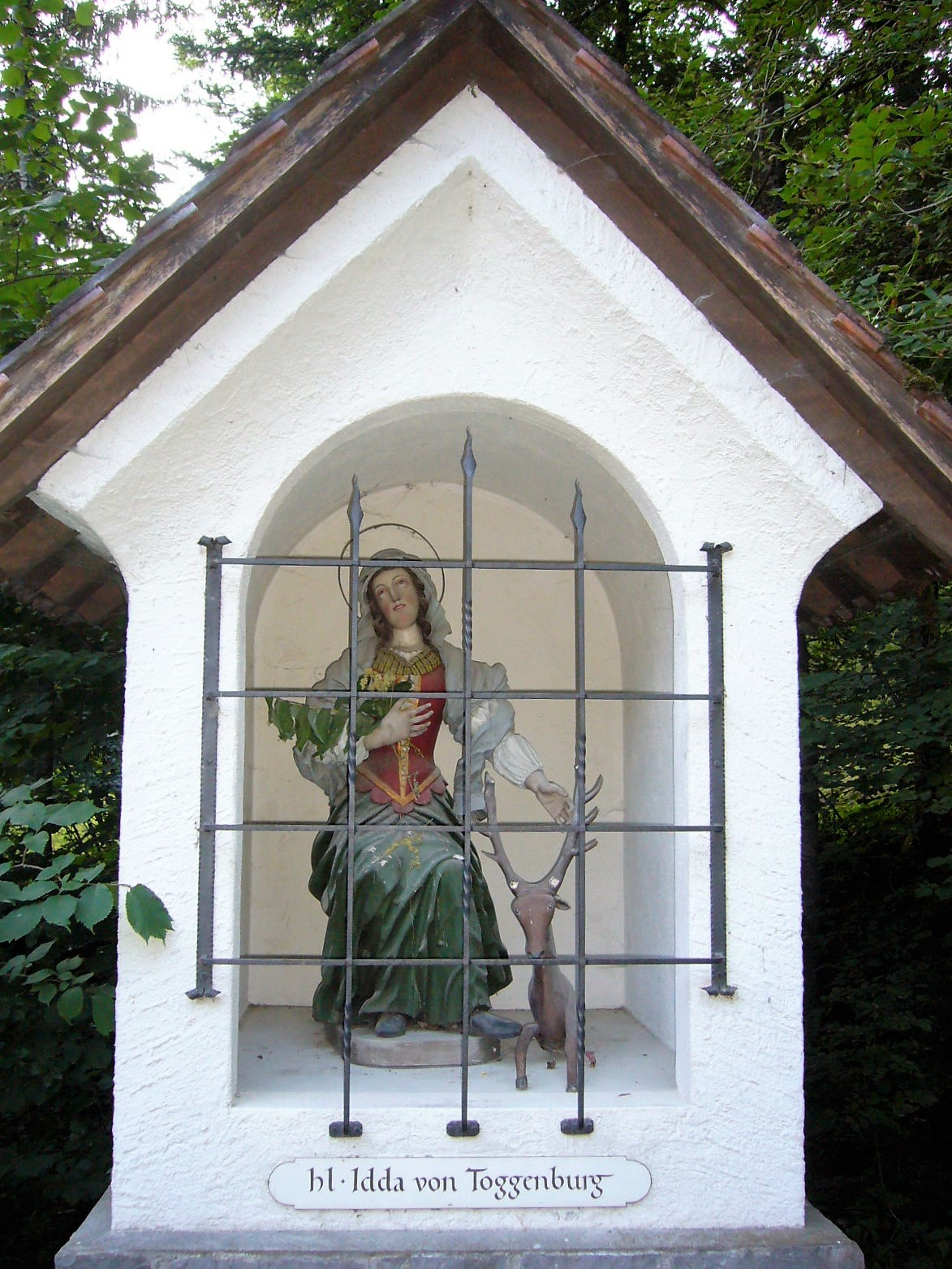
Ida of Toggenburg and a deer with 12 candles

Article title	Attributes
Ida of Toggenburg	Deer, or a deer with 12 candles, crow
Ignatius of Antioch	bishops vestments, surrounded by lions or in chains^{[a]}
Ignatius of Loyola	chasuble, book often inscribed with Ad majorem Dei gloriam, or the letters AMDG, the christogram IHS with a cross across the h (traditionally with three nails below the letters, and the letters and nails surrounded by the sun's rays), sword, cross, biretta ^{[a]}
Imelda Lambertini	Wearing first communion dress, chapel veil with attached to a chaplet of flowers on her head and rosary
Imerius of Immertal	hermit's garb and bird of prey^{[a]}
Indaletius	miter, staff and a book in his hands
Inés de Benigánim	Religious habit of a Discalced Augustinian nun
Innocent XI	Papal attire, Papal tiara, camauro
Innocent of Alaska	Vested as a bishop, with a moderately long black beard, holding a Gospel Book or scroll
Innocenzo da Berzo	Capuchin habit
Inocencio of Mary Immaculate	Passionist habit and Passionist Sign
Irene of Rome	Tending to Saint Sebastian
Irene of Tomar	martyr's palm^{[a]}
Irene Stefani	Religious habit of the Consolata Missionary Sisters
Irmgard of Chiemsee	crozier of an abbess, flaming heart, Benedictine habit, crown
Irmina of Oeren	a church in her hand, signifying her status as a church founder; with two angels above her head, carrying her soul to heaven
Isaac of Dalmatia	Clothed as an Eastern monk, sometimes holding a scroll with a quotation from his hagiography, sometimes carrying a paterissa
Isaac of Nineveh	Scrolls and books, writing tools
Isabel Cristina Mrad Campos	Martyr's palm, Lily flower, rosary
Isaiah	With gray hair and beard holding a scroll with words from Isaiah 7:14, (in Latin) ecce virgo concipiet et pariet filium et vocabitur nomen eius Emmanuel (behold, a virgin shall conceive and bear a son, and his name shall be Emmanuel)^{[b]}
Isabel Sánchez Romero	Dominican habit, crucifix
Isidore De Loor	Passionist habit
Isidore of Seville	bees; holding a pen while surrounded by a swarm of bees; bishop standing near a beehive; with a prince at his feet; pen; with pen and book; with Ss. Leander, Fulgentius, and Florentina; with his Etymologiae^{[a]}
Isidore the Laborer	peasant holding a sickle and a sheaf of corn, a sickle and staff, as an angel plows for him; or with an angel and white oxen near him. In Spanish art, his attributes are a spade or a plough.
Isnardo da Chiampo	Dominican habit
István Sándor (martyr)	book, Martyr's palm
Ivo of Kermartin	as a lawyer, holding a document, in legal dress^{[a]}

=== J ===
J
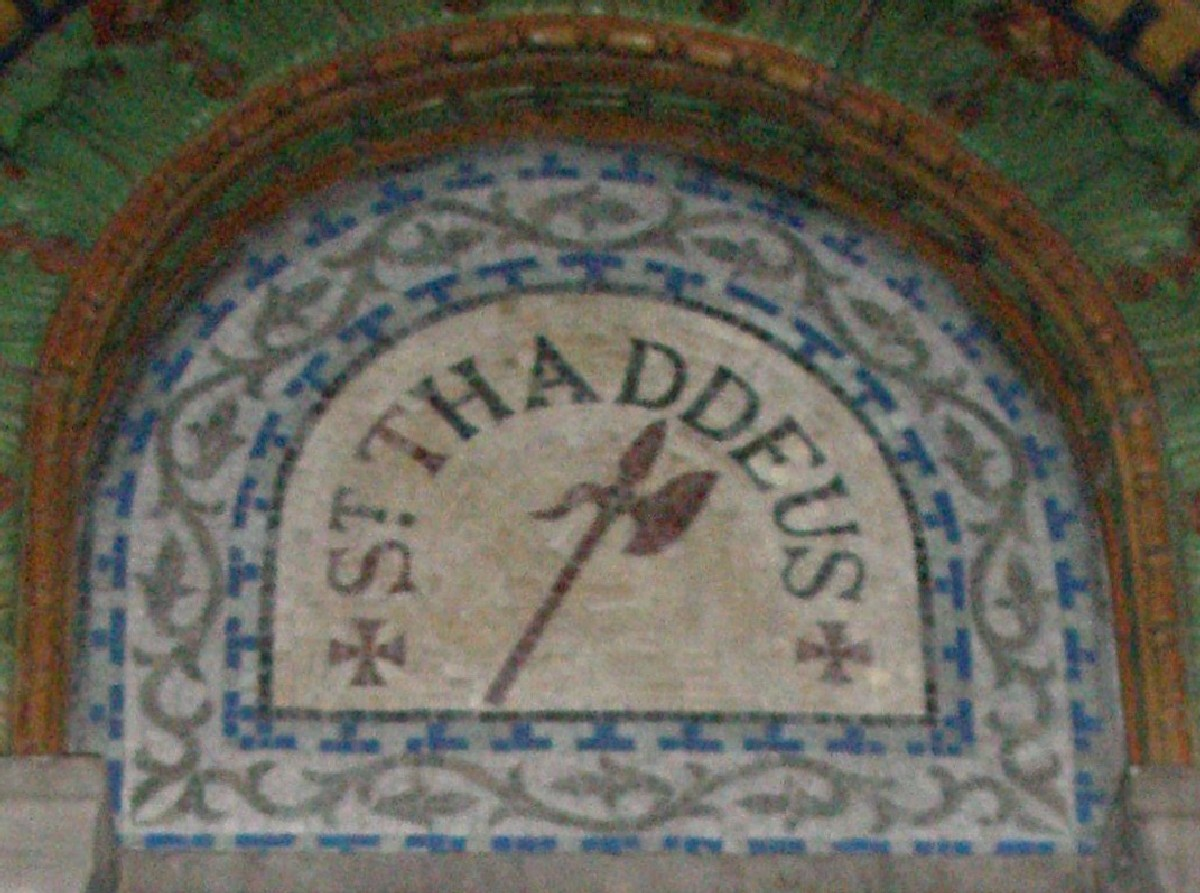
An axe, the symbol of the martyrdom of Saint Jude the Apostle

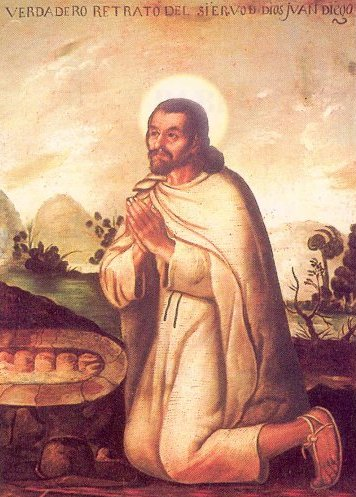
Juan Diego, wearing a tilmàtli

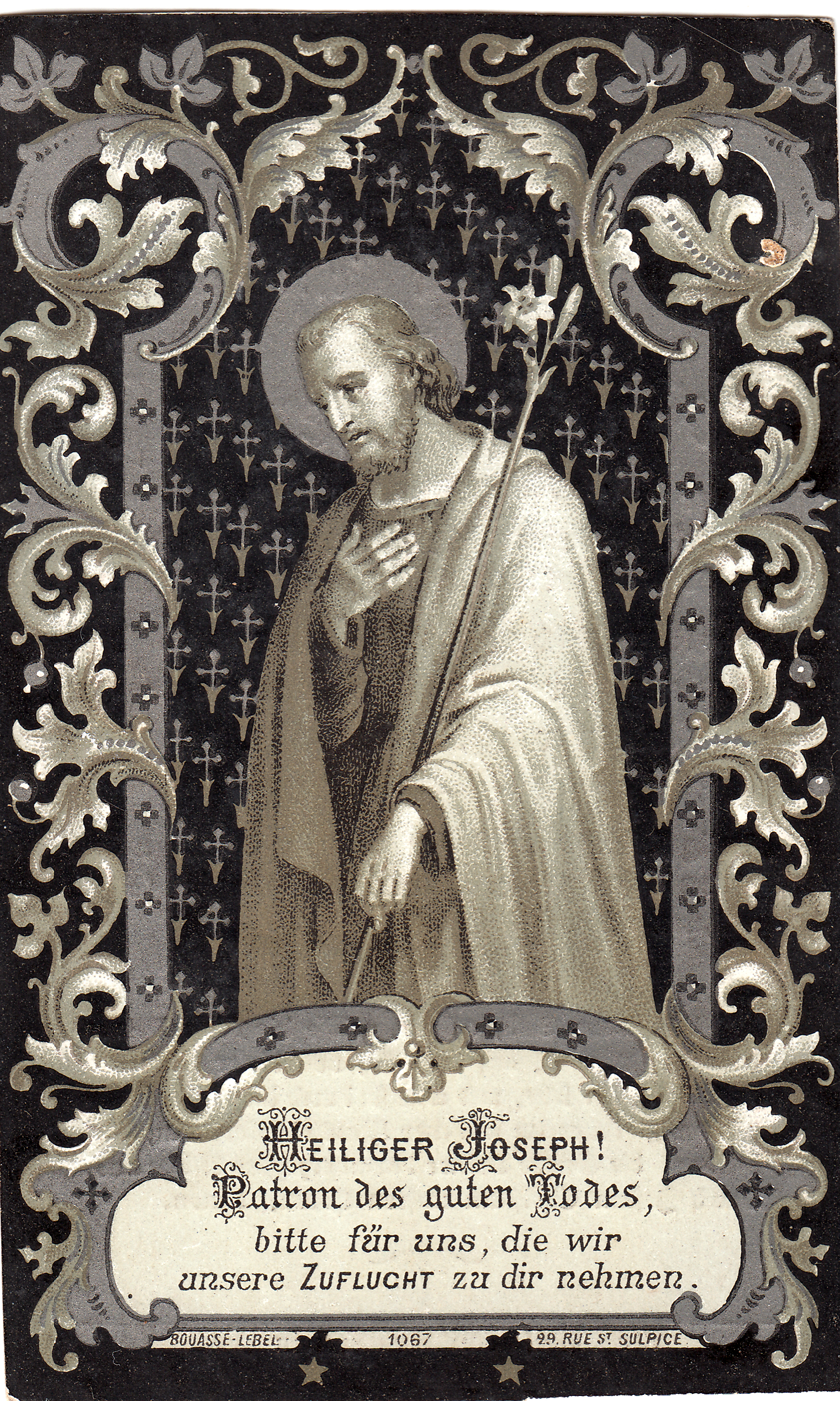
Saint Joseph holding a rod of spikenard

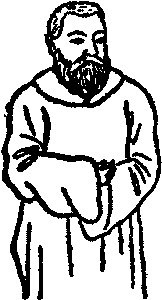
Cistercian religious habit

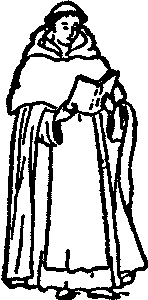
Dominican religious habit

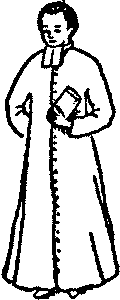
De La Salle Christian Brother habit

Article title	Attributes
Jadwiga of Poland	Royal dress and shoes, apron full of roses
James the Less	carpenter saw, fuller's club
James of the Marches	Depicted holding in his right hand a chalice, out of which a snake is escaping
James the Great	Red Martyr, Scallop, Pilgrim's hat
James, brother of Jesus	Red Martyr, fuller's club; man holding a book
James, son of Alphaeus	Carpenter's saw; fuller's club
Jan Franciszek Macha	Priest's cassock
Jan Sarkander	Priest's attire
Jan Tyranowski	Rosary
Jan Wojciech Balicki	Cassock
Janina Szymkowiak	Religious habit
János Brenner	Cistercian habit
Januarius	vials of blood, palms, Mount Vesuvius
Jean de Brébeuf	Pyx
Jean-Baptiste de La Salle	Book, Christian Brothers habit
Jean-Baptiste Fouque	Priest's attire
Jeanne-Antide Thouret	Religious habit
Jegudiel	Crown, whip
Jerahmeel (archangel)	Balance scales
Jeremiah of Wallachia	Franciscan habit
Jerome	hermitage, lion, hermit wearing a cardinal's galero, vestments of a cardinal, cross, skull, books and writing material, stone in hand^{[a]}
Jerzy Popiełuszko	Crucifix
Joachim Piccolomini	Servite holding a book and flower
Joachim	dressed in green, with book and scroll
Joan of Arc	shield, armament, Cross of Lorraine^{[a]}
Joan of France, Duchess of Berry	crowned Annonciade abbess, usually with cross and rosary, or holding the hand of the Christ Child, who is holding a basket; Annonciade abbess with basket of bread and cup of wine; with Father Gabriel Mary; having a ring placed on her finger by the Christ Child
Saint Joanna	lamb^{[a]}
Joaquina Vedruna de Mas	Religious habit
Job of Pochayev	Vested as a monk, holding an abbot's crozier
Joel (prophet)	Prophet
Johann Philipp Jeningen	Priest's cassock
Johannes Laurentius Weiss	Franciscan habit, Palm of martyrdom
Johannes Ludovicus Paquay	Franciscan habit
John Berchmans	Rule of Saint Ignatius, cross, rosary^{[a]}
John Berthier	Priest's cassock
John Bosco	Cassock, Biretta
John XXIII	Papal Vestments, Papal Tiara, Camauro
John Paul I	Papal attire, Pallium
John Paul II	Papal ferula, Papal vestments
John Calybite	Beggar with a Gospel in his hand
John Cantius	in a professor's gown with his arm around shoulder of a young student whose gaze is directed towards Heaven; giving his garments to the poor
John Chrysostom	Vested as a bishop, holding a Gospel Book or scroll, right hand raised in blessing. He is depicted as emaciated from fasting, with a high forehead, balding with dark hair and a small beard. Symbols: beehive, a white dove, a pan, chalice on a bible, pen and inkhorn ^{[a]}
John Climacus	Clothed as a monk, sometimes with an Abbot's paterissa (crozier), sometimes holding a copy of his Ladder
John Eudes	Priest's attire, Sacred Heart
John Gualbert	Benedictine habit
John Henry Newman	Cardinal's attire, Oratorian Habit
John Joseph of the Cross	Franciscan habit
John Leonardi	Priest's cassock, Rule of the Order, quill, mortar and pestle
John of Damascus	Severed hand, icon
John of God	alms, heart, crown of thorns^{[a]}
John of Matha	purse, man in Trinitarian habit, with the white with blue and red cross on the breast, with chains in his hands or at his feet, captives near him, and his mitre at his feet
John of Nepomuk	halo of five stars, palm, priestly dress, cross, bridge, angel indicating silence by a finger over the lips, Biretta
John of Sahagún	holding a Chalice and host surrounded by rays of light
John of the Cross	Carmelite habit, cross, crucifix, book, and a quill
John Righi	Franciscan habit
John Soreth	Carmelite habit, ciborium
John the Apostle	Book, a serpent in a chalice, cauldron, eagle
John the Baptist	lamb, head on a platter, animal skin (the camel-skin coat of the Gospels), pointing at Christ or a lamb, often portrayed carrying a long crudely made cross^{[a]}
John the Dwarf	Short Monk watering a stick
John the Evangelist	Eagle
John the Merciful	Bishop's vestment, miter, crosier
John Twenge	holding a fish
John Vianney	Cassock, surplice, preaching bands, stole, rosary, crucifix, and a Bible
Jón Ögmundsson	bishop's staff, miter, book
Jonathan (1 Samuel)	Bow and Arrow
Jophiel	Flaming sword
Jordan of Bristol |Hhabit and tonsure of a monk, hand raised in blessing, bearing bread and wine, companion of Augustine of Canterbury
Jose Gabriel del Rosario Brochero	Priest's cassock, Rosary
José Gálvez Ginachero	Lab coat
José Gregorio Hernández	Doctor's coat
José Maria de Yermo y Parres	Priest's cassock
José Sánchez del Río	Crucifix, Palm branch
Josefa Naval Girbés	Carmelite habit
Josemaría Escrivá	Priest attire, rosary
Josep Manyanet i Vives	Priest's cassock
Josep Samsó Elías	Priest's cassock
Josep Tous Soler	Capuchin habit, Priest's cassock
Joseph of Anchieta	Gospel book, crucifix and Walking stick^{[a]}
Joseph, spouse of Mary	Christ Child, white lily, rod, plane, carpentry square, often brown robe and/or mantle^{[a]}, holding a rod of spikenard
Joseph Cafasso	Priest's attire
Joseph Calasanz	Cassock, biretta, and ferraiolo
Joseph Gérard	Priest's attire
Joseph Kugler	Religious habit
Joseph Oriol	Priest's cassock
Joseph Vandor	Priest's attire
Joseph Vaz	Mitre placed to side, holding crucifix, sun icon, Oratorian habit
Joseph Vithayathil	Religious habit
Joshua	Often depicted with Caleb, carrying the grapes out of Canaan
Jovan Vladimir	depicted with a mustache and short beard, wearing a cloak and a crown inscribed with lilies, holding a martyr's cross in his right hand, and his severed head in his left hand.
Juan de Castillo (Jesuit)	Palm of martyrdom
Juan de Prado	Franciscan habit, Sword, Fire
Juan de Ribera	Episcopal attire
Juan Diego	Tilma with the impressed image of the Virgin Mary, roses^{[a]}
Juan García López-Rico	Trinitarian habit, Crucifix
Juan Manuel Martín del Campo	Cassock, Stole
Juan Nepomuceno Zegrí Moreno	Cassock
Juana de la Cruz Vázquez Gutiérrez	Brown habit of the Franciscan Third Order Regular Sisters, holding a large cross
Juana María Condesa Lluch	Religious habit
Jude the Apostle	Axe, club, boat, oar, medallion
Judoc	pilgrim's staff; a crown at his feet
Judicael	Warrior king holding a book, crown at his feet, sometimes with the Breton shield of arms
Julia Greeley	Rosary, Child, Tau cross
Julia of Corsica	Palm of martyrdom, crucifix
Julia Teresa Tallon	Religious habit
Julian and Basilissa	Palm of martyrdom
Julian of Antioch	portrayed as being cast into the sea in a sack full of serpents and scorpions. He may also be shown as his coffin floats with four angels seated on it, or being led bound on a dromedary.
Julian of Le Mans	Sometimes pictured as a bishop raising a dead child to life, also shown vanquishing a dragon
Julian of Norwich	holding a radiant cross, reading in her writing Revelations of Divine Love, wearing the attire of a anchoress
Julian the Hospitaller	Carrying a leper through a river; ferryman; hart; holding an oar; man listening to a talking stag; oar; stag; with Jesus and Saint Martha as patrons of travelers; young hunter with a stag; young man killing his parents in bed; young man wearing a fur-lined cloak, sword, and gloves; young, well-dressed man holding a hawk on his finger
Juliana Falconieri	represented in the habit of the Mantellates with a Eucharistic host upon her breast
Juliana of Liège	holding a monstrance
Juliana of Nicomedia	Represented in pictures with a winged devil whom she leads by a chain. She is also shown enduring various tortures or fighting a dragon.
Julian-Nicolas Rèche	De La Sallian habit
Julius of Novara	staff, sailing on his cloak to Isola Giulio over a lake
Junia (New Testament person)	Christian Martyrdom
Junípero Serra	Franciscan habit, wearing a large crucifix, or holding a crucifix accompanied by a young Native American boy
Justa and Rufina	A model of the Giralda; earthenware pots, bowls and platters; books on which are two lumps of potter's clay; palms of martyrdom; lion
Justin Popović	Shown holding a hagiography book
Justin Martyr	axe, sword^{[a]}
Justina of Padua	martyr's palm, knife, unicorn^{[a]}
Justina of Padua	young woman setting a cross on the head of the devil while holding a lily in her hand; young woman with a crown, palm, and sword; young woman with a palm, book, and a sword in her breast; young woman with a unicorn, symbolizing virginity, and palm; young woman with Saint Prosdocimus
Justinian I	Imperial Vestment
Justus of Beauvais	palm of martyrdom; depicted as young boy
Justus of Trieste	Spear, flowers across his chest and holding a palm and cathedral
Juthwara	round soft cheese, sword; with Sidwell; as cephalophore^{[a]}
Juvenal of Narni	holding a sword in his mouth; holding a chalice
Juvenaly of Alaska	Monastic habit, Epitrachelion, martyr's cross

=== K ===
K
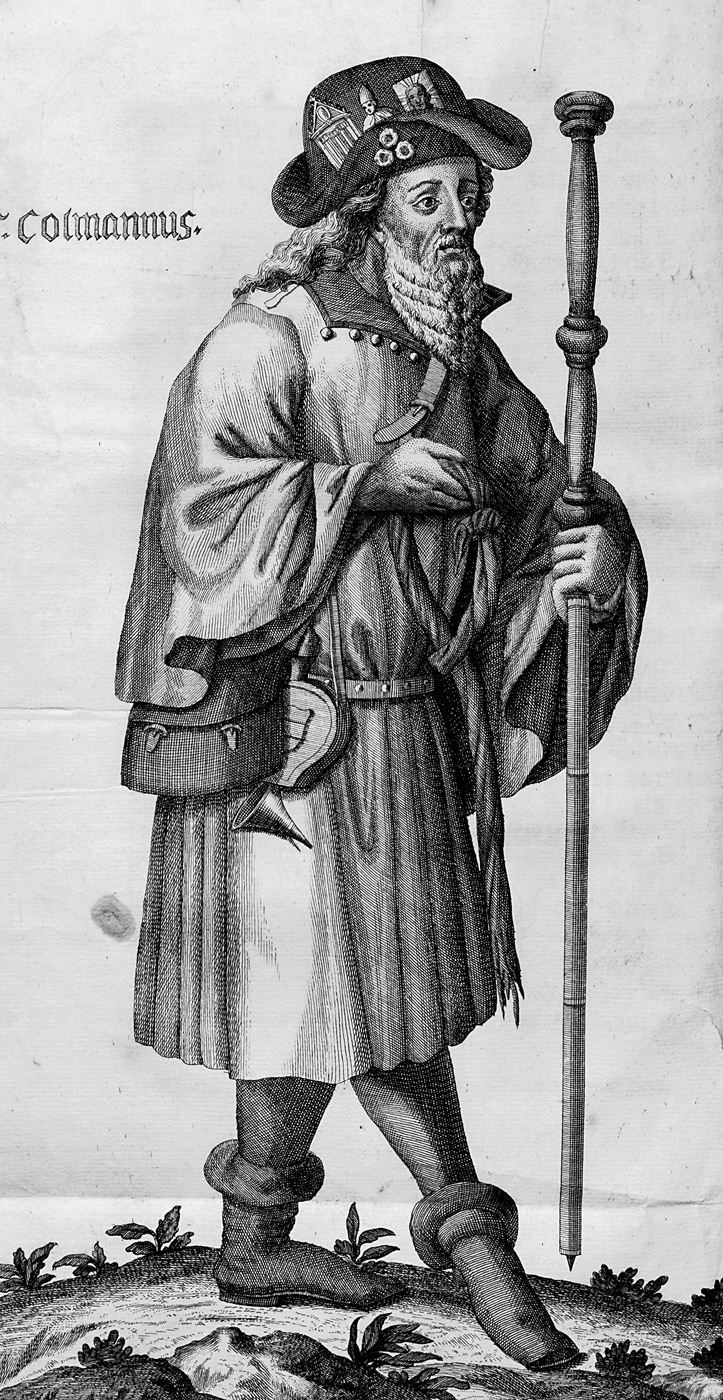
Koloman

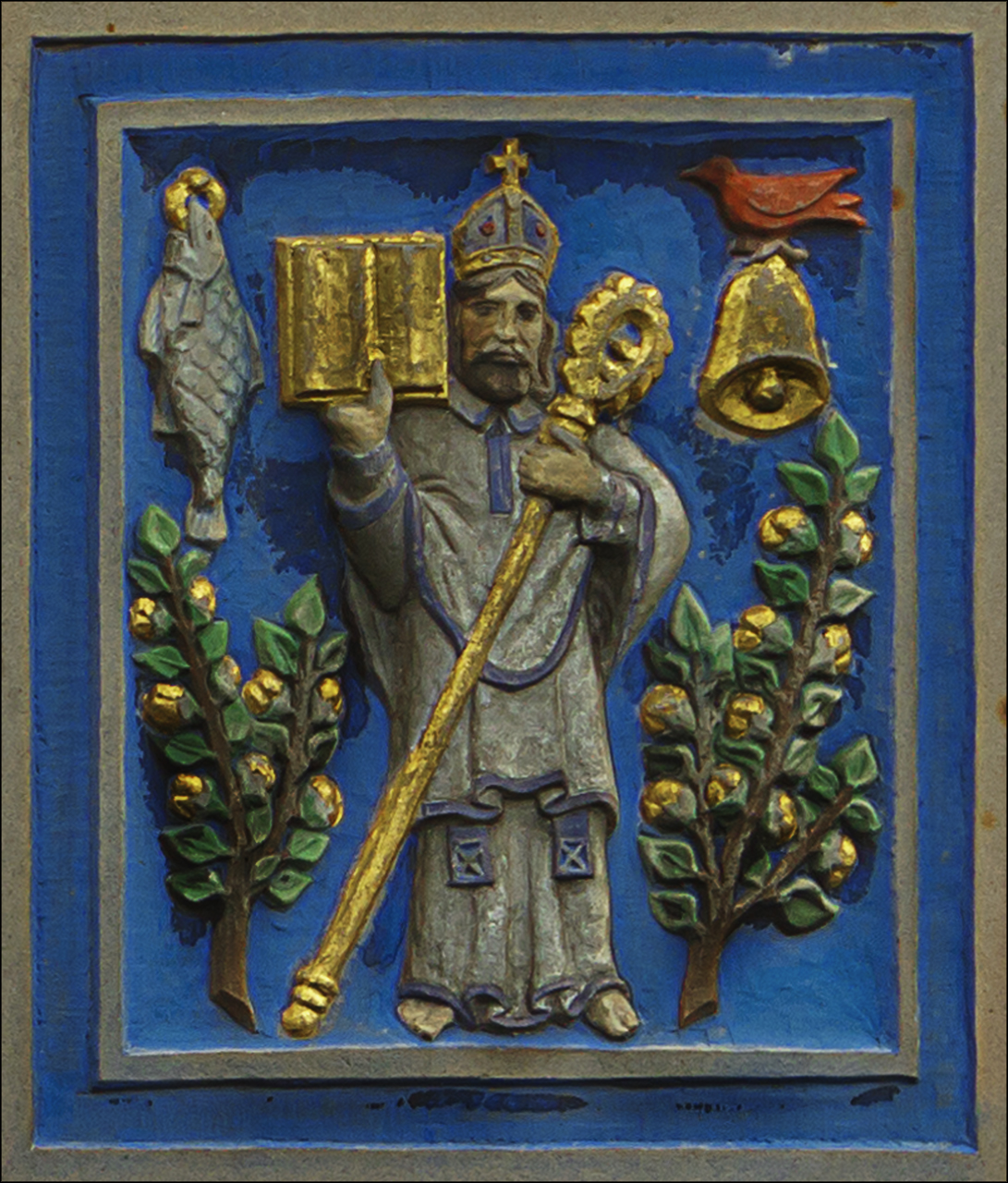
Kentigern with a robin, a bell and a fish with a ring in its mouth

Article title	Attributes
Katharine Drexel	habit of the Sisters of the Blessed Sacrament^{[a]}
Kalliopi (martyr)	hot iron pressed to her breast
Kamen Vitchev	Assumptionist habit, cross, book
Karolina Gerhardinger	Religious habit of the School Sisters
Karolina Kózka	Lily flowers, martyr's palm, Rosary
Kaspar Stanggassinger	Priest's habit
Kateri Tekakwitha	turtle, white lily, cross, rosary^{[a]}^{[b]}
Katherine of Ledbury	ringing bells, the footprints of her stolen horse, clairvoyance, herbs and milk
Kentigern	bishop with a robin on his shoulder; holding a bell and a fish with a ring in its mouth
Kea	hermit with a stag
Kessog	in a soldier's habit, holding a bow bent with an arrow in it
Kevin of Glendalough	blackbird^{[a]}
Khalīl al-Haddād	Franciscan habit, rosary
Kilian	wearing a bishop's mitre and wielding a sword^{[a]}
Kinga of Poland	Depicted as an abbess; crown
Kjeld of Viborg	cassock, book^{[a]}
Knut of Denmark	royal insignia, dagger, lance or arrow.^{[a]}
Koloman	pilgrim's hat and dress, rope in his hand; hanging on a gibbet; tongs and rod; book and maniple^{[b]}
Kristos Samra	Woman with two-sided wings
Kuriakose Elias Chavara	Catholic saint, founder and social reformer

=== L ===
L
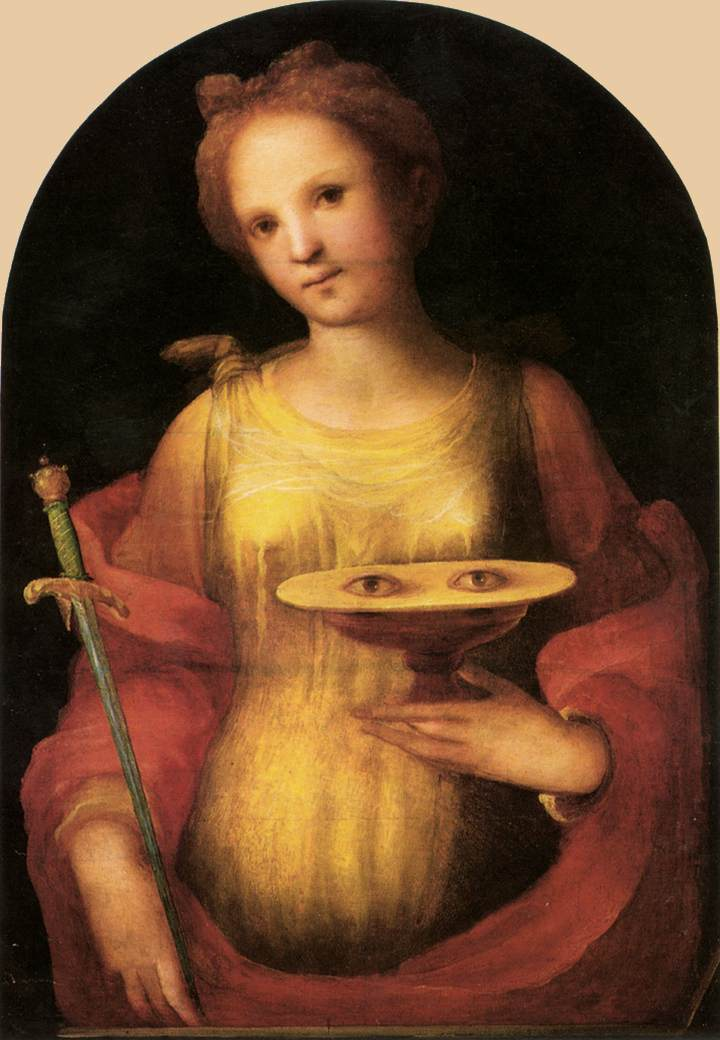
Saint Lucy with her eyes on a plate

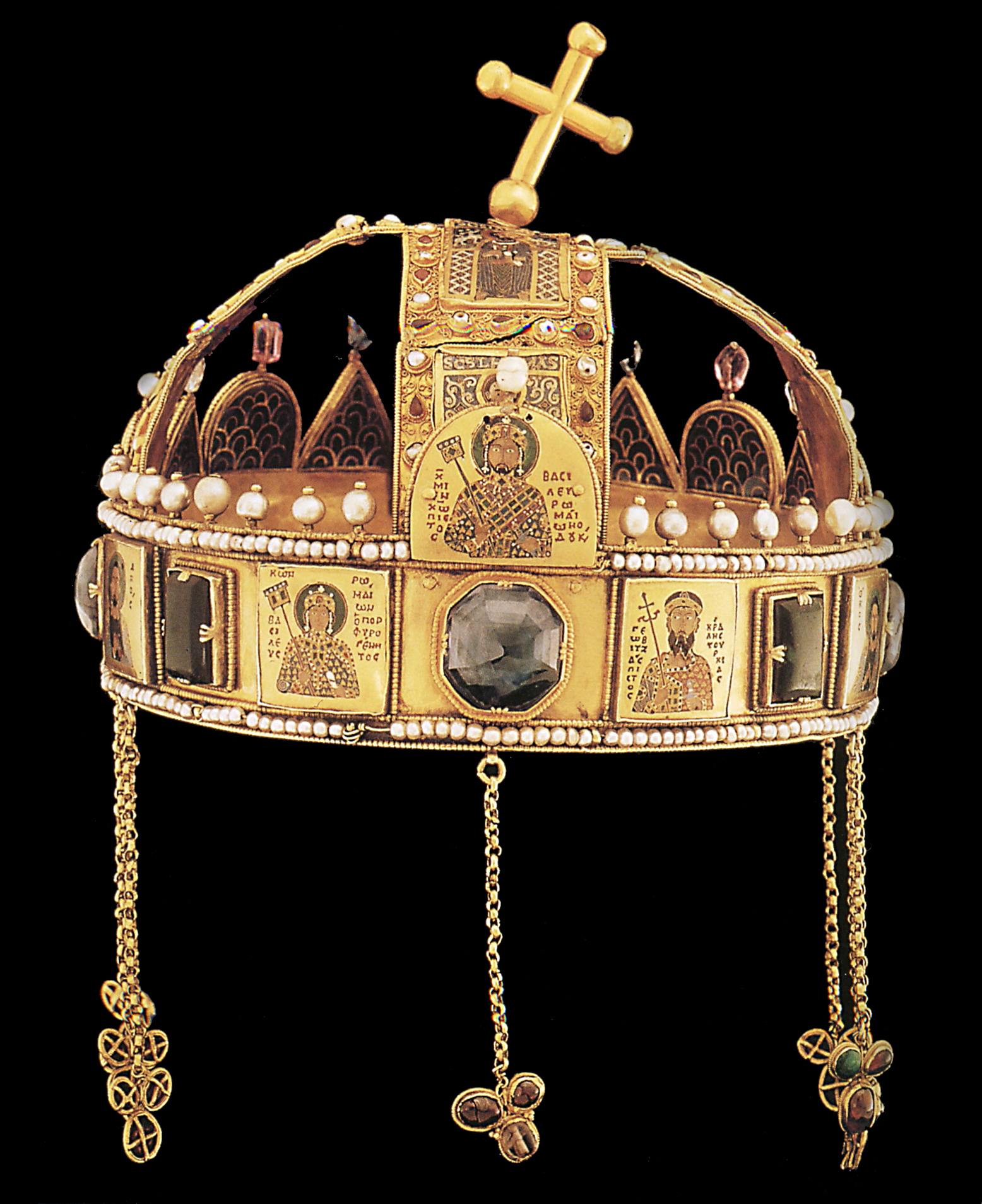
Holy Crown of Hungary

Article title	Attributes
Ladislaus I of Hungary	defended by two angels
Lambert of Maastricht	martyr's palm^{[a]}, sword^{[b]}
Laureana Franco	Rosary, Catechism book
Lawrence of Rome	Usually holding a gridiron and wearing a dalmatic^{[b]}, cross, evangelistary, martyr's palm, purse of money
Lawrence of Brindisi	Leading soldiers against the Turks, With the Infant Jesus
Lazarus of Bethany	Sailing to Marseilles
Leander of Seville	episcopal attire, pen^{[a]}
Leo I (emperor)	Imperial attire
Leobinus	depicted on his death-bed receiving the last rites from his successor Saint Caletric
Leocadia	Represented with a tower, to signify that she died in prison.
Leodegar	holding a hook with two prongs
Leonard Melki	Franciscan habit
Leonard of Noblac	depicted as an abbot holding chains, fetters or locks, or manacles.
Leonard of Port Maurice	Franciscan habit
Leonardo Murialdo	Priest's attire, book
Leonella Sgorbati	Religious habit
Leonie Aviat	Religious habit
Léonie Martin	Nun's habit
Leopold III, Margrave of Austria	Holding a model of a church
Leopold of Alpandeire	Capuchin habit
Leopoldo da Gaiche	Crown of thorns, Franciscan habit, Crucifix
Leucius of Brindisi	Pastoral Staff
Leudwinus	Eagle
Lev of Optina	Clothed as a hieromonk, sometimes holding a scroll
Liberalis of Treviso	depicted as a knight
Liborius of Le Mans	pebbles on a book; peacocks; episcopal attire
Liborius Wagner	Cassock, sword, palm
Lindalva Justo de Oliveira	Religious habit, Palm
Liphardus	Hermit fighting a dragon with a stick
Lodovico Pavoni	Cassock, Zucchetto
Lojze Grozde	book, palm, snowdrop
Longinus	Roman soldier's attire, lance
Lorenzo da Ripafratta	Dominican habit
Lorenzo Maria of Saint Francis Xavier	Passionist habit, Image of the Child Jesus
Lorenzo Ruiz	Rosary in clasped hands, gallows and pit, barong tagalog and black trousers, cross, martyr's palm^{[a]}
Louis Bertrand	A chalice containing a snake
Louis Brisson	Priest's attire
Louis IX of France	royal attire of crown, sceptre, and blue mantle decorated with golden fleur-de-lis, and the other parts of the French regalia; crown of thorns, nails, globus cruciger^{[b]}
Louis of Toulouse	silk gloves and a richly embroidered cape with a jeweled clasp at the neck^{[b]}, boy bishop, often with a discarded crown by his feet; represented vested in pontifical garments and holding a book and a crosier
Louis Querbes	Priest's cassock
Louis-Antoine-Rose Ormières Lacase	Priest's cassock
Louise de Marillac	Widow's clothing
Louise of France	Carmelite habit, rosary
Louis-Édouard Cestac	Priest's attire
Louis-Marie Baudouin	Cassock, Zucchetto
Luca Antonio Falcone	Franciscan habit, Rosary, Crucifix
Luca Passi	Priest's cassock
Florida Cevoli	Religious habit of the Capuchin Poor Clares, crucifix, white lilies
Lucy	robe of a virgin, with her eyes on a plate, lamp, sword^{[a]} (also: Cord; woman hitched to a yoke of oxen; woman in the company of Saint Agatha, Saint Agnes of Rome, Barbara, Catherine of Alexandria, and Saint Thecla; woman kneeling before the tomb of Saint Agatha)
Lucy Brocadelli	Dominican habit, rosary
Lucy Filippini	Religious habit
Ludger	Bishop holding a cathedral; reciting his Breviary; with a swan on either side
Ludmila of Bohemia	veil
Ludovico Morbioli	Crucifix
Ludovico of Casoria	Franciscan habit
Ludwika Szczęsna	Religious habit, Crucifix, Heart
Luigi Biraghi	Cassock
Luigi Boccardo	Stole, cassock
Luigi Bordino	Sacred Heart
Luigi Caburlotto	Priest's cassock, Zucchetto
Luigi Guanella	Cassock
Luigi Lenzini	Priest's cassock
Luigi Maria Palazzolo	Priest's cassock
Luigi Monza	Cassock
Luigi Rabatà	Carmelite habit, arrow, martyr's palm
Luigi Scrosoppi	Priest's cassock, Book, Zucchetto, Rosary
Luigi Talamoni	Priest's attire
Luigi Tezza	Cassock, Cross
Luigi Variara	Cassock
Luigi Versiglia	Episcopal attire, martyr's palm, chalice
Luka (Voyno-Yasenetsky)	Wearing bishop's vestment, pectoral cross and engolpion worn about his neck, miter and crozier.
Lupus of Troyes	depicted with a diamond falling from heaven as he celebrates Mass; shown holding a chalice with a diamond in it or at the altar, giving a diamond to a king
Lutgardis	as Christ shows her his wounded side; habit and attributes of a Cistercian abbess; being blinded by the Heart of Jesus; nun to whom Christ extends his hand from the cross; in attendance when Christ shows his Heart to the Father
Luxurious	Palm branch

=== M ===
M
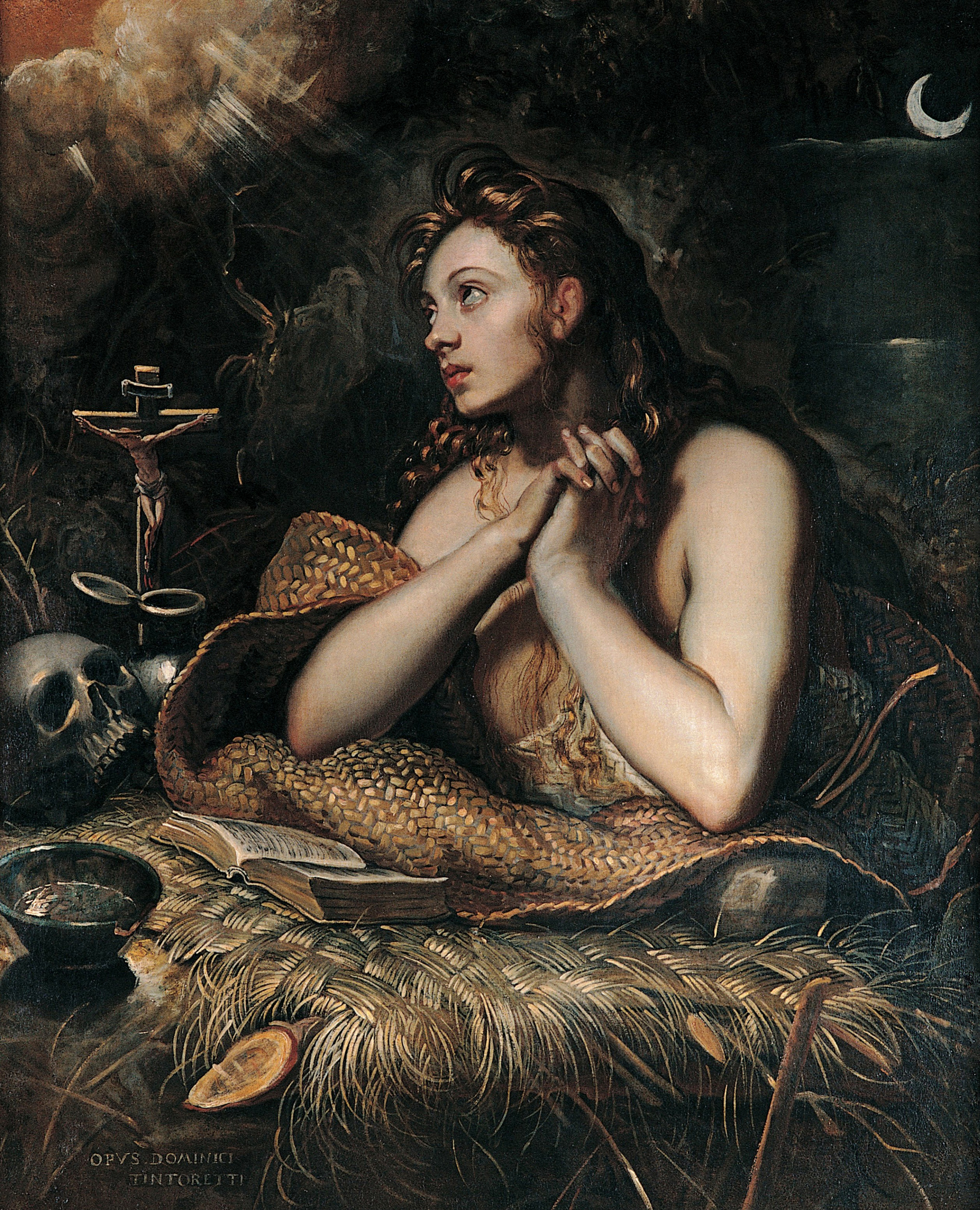
Mary Magdalene pictured with her attributes

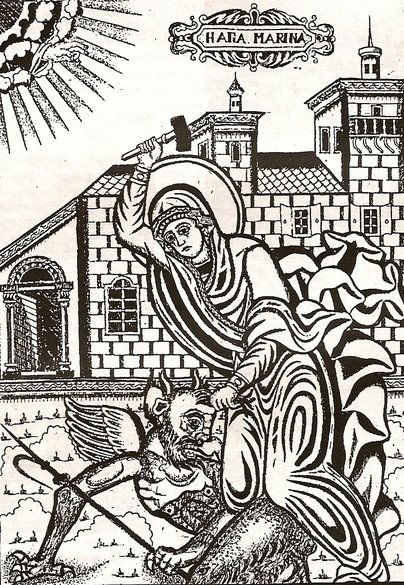
Marina of Antioch beating a demon with a hammer

Article title	Attributes
Máedóc of Ferns	Honey bees
Mary Magdalene	jar of ointment, long hair, washing Christ's feet, skull, crucifix, red egg^{[a]}
Magdalene of Nagasaki	Palm, Augustinian habit (without the typical nun hair net, since she was a lay sister), books
Magnus Erlendsson, Earl of Orkney	Viking clothing, axe
Magnus of Anagni	episcopal attire, martyr's palm
Magnus of Cuneo	depicted as a soldier bearing a banner and the martyr's palm
Małgorzata Szewczyk	Religious habit, rosary
Malo (saint)	Depicted as an abbot and a bishop
Mamertinus of Auxerre	depicted lying in his cell before his death
Mami Wata	Snakes, pearls, gold, diamonds
Mamilian of Palermo	episcopal attire
Mammes of Caesarea	lion
Manuel Aparici Navarro	Priest's cassock
Manuel Domingo y Sol	Priest's cassock
Manuel Lozano Garrido	Newspaper, Rosary, Pen
Manuel Míguez González	Priest's attire
Manuel Solórzano	martyr's palm
Manuela de Jesús Arias Espinosa	Religious habit
Marcantonio Durando	Priest's cassock
Marcellinus and Peter	Depicted as two tonsured men holding crowns; martyr's palm; depicted alongside St. Pollio
Marcello Labor	Priest's attire
Marcian of Tortona	martyr's palm
Marciana of Mauretania	represented with a leopard and bull near her
Marco da Montegallo	Franciscan habit
Marco d'Aviano	Franciscan habit
Marco Passionei	Franciscan habit, crucifix, book
Margaret of Castello	a lily and a heart
Margaret of Hungary (saint)	A lily and a book
Margaret of Scotland	reading the bible^{[a]}
Margaret Pole, Countess of Salisbury	martyr's palm, rosary, tunic bearing the Five Wounds of Christ
Margaret the Virgin	dragon, sometimes in chains, martyr's cross, hammer^{[a]}
Margareta Ebner	Dominican habit
Margaretha Flesch	Religious habit
Margarito Flores García	palm
Margherita Colonna	Poor Clares habit
Marguerite Bays	rosary, Stigmata
Marguerite Rutan	Religious habit
Maria Adeodata Pisani	Benedictine habit, crucifix, bible
Maria Angela Astorch	Crosier, monstrance, breviary, Baby Jesus
Maria Angela Picco	Religious habit
María Angélica Pérez	Religious habit
Maria Anna Donati	Religious habit, crucifix
Maria Anna Rosa Caiani	Nun's habit
Maria Anna Sala	Religious habit
María Antonia Bandrés Elósegui	Religious habit
María Antonia de Paz y Figueroa	Religious habit, crucifix
Maria Assunta Pallotta	Religious habit
Maria Bagnesi	Dominican habit, crucifix, dagger
Maria Bernarda Bütler	Religious habit
Maria Candida of the Eucharist	Carmelite habit
María Catalina Irigoyen Echegaray	Religious habit
Maria Caterina Troiani	Nun's habit, crucifix
Maria Clara of the Child Jesus	Religious habit
Maria Costanza Panas	Franciscan habit
Maria Cristina of the Immaculate Conception Brando	Religious habit
Maria Crocifissa Curcio	Religious habit
Maria Crocifissa di Rosa	Religious habit
María de la Purísima Salvat Romero	Religious habit, rosary, Book of Hours
María de las Maravillas de Jesús	Discalced Carmelite habit, holding the rule of the order
Maria De Mattias	Foundress
María del Carmen González-Ramos García-Prieto de Muñoz	Religious habit
María del Tránsito Cabanillas	Religious habit
Maria Domenica Brun Barbantini	Religious habit
Maria Domenica Mantovani	Religious habit
Maria Dulce Rodrigues dos Santos	Nun's habit
Maria Elisabetta Renzi	Religious habit, crucifix
María Emilia Riquelme y Zayas	Religious habit
María Francisca Ricart Olmos	Religious habit
Maria Gargani	Religious habit
Maria Giovanna Fasce	Augustinian habit
Maria Giuseppa Rossello	Religious habit, book, lily
Maria Goretti	fourteen white lilies; humble clothing; (occasionally) a knife; martyr's palm
Maria Grazia Tarallo	Nun's habit, Scapular
María Guadalupe García Zavala	Religious habit
María Guggiari Echeverría	Discalced Carmelite habit
Maria Hueber	Religious habit
Maria Josefa Alhama y Valera	Religious habit
Maria Josefa Karolina Brader	Religious habit
María Josefa Sancho de Guerra	Book|Religious habit, Sash, rosary
Maria Karłowska	Religious habit
Maria Katharina Kasper	Religious habit, crucifix
Maria Katherina Scherer	Religious habit
Maria Laura Mainetti	Martyr's palm, rosary
Maria Llorença Llong	Religious habit
María López de Rivas Martínez	Nun's habit, crucifix
Maria Maddalena Martinengo	Nun's habit, crucifix, rosary, White flowers
Maria Magdalena Jahn	Religious habit, rosary, crucifix
Blandine Merten	Religious habit
Maria Merkert	Religious habit
Maria Micaela Desmaisieres	Religious habit
María Natividad Venegas de la Torre	Nun's habit, heart
Maria Pia Mastena	Religious habit
María Pilar Izquierdo Albero	Religious habit
María Pilar López de Maturana Ortiz de Zárate	Religious habit
María Rafols Bruna	Religious habit
Maria Repetto	Religious habit
Maria Ripamonti	Religious habit
María Romero Meneses	Religious habit
Maria Schininà	Religious habit
Maria Scrilli	crucifix, Carmelite habit
Maria Soledad Torres y Acosta	Religious habit
Maria Teresa Casini	Religious habit
Maria Teresa Merlo	Religious habit
Maria Teresa of St. Joseph	Religious habit
Maria Therese von Wüllenweber	Nun's habit
Maria Theresia Bonzel	Nun's habit
Maria Troncatti	Religious habit
Maria Velotti	Religious habit
Maria Vicenta Rosal	Religious habit
Maria Vittoria De Fornari Strata	Religious habit
Mariam Baouardy	Carmelite Nun's habit
Mariam Thresia Chiramel	Religious habit
Mariam Vattalil	Religious habit
Mariana de Jesús de Paredes	Lily, black cassock embroidered with the Christogram of IHS
Mariana Navarro de Guevarra Romero	Religious habit, Cross, Lily, Heart
Marianna Fontanella	Carmelite habit, crucifix, White flower
Mariano Arciero	Priest's attire, crucifix
Mariano da Roccacasale	Franciscan habit
Mariano de Jesús Euse Hoyos	Priest's cassock
Mariano de la Mata	Priest's attire
Marie Anne Blondin	Religious habit
Marie Deluil-Martiny	Religious habit of the Daughters of the Heart of Jesus, Sacred Heart
Marie-Léonie Paradis	religious habit of a Sister of the Holy Family, rosary, crucifix
Marie of Oignies	protected from rain by the Virgin Mary sheltering her with her mantle
Marie of the Incarnation (Carmelite)	Religious habit
Marie of the Incarnation (Ursuline)	Religious habit
Marie-Alphonsine Danil Ghattas	Religious habit, rosary
Marie-Anne-Marcelle Mallet	Religious habit
Marie-Clémentine Anuarite Nengapeta	Religious habit
Marie-Élisabeth Turgeon	Nun's habit, crucifix
Marie-Eugène de l'Enfant-Jésus	Carmelite habit
Marie-Eugénie de Jésus	Religious habit
Marie-Geneviève Meunier	Religious habit
Marie-Madeleine Postel	Religious habit, crucifix
Marie-Marguerite d'Youville	Religious habit
Marie-Rosalie Cadron-Jetté	Religious habit
Marinus	Depicted with a stonemason's hammer and tools; two oxen near him.
Mario Ciceri	Priest's cassock
Mark of Ephesus	Long white beard, vested as a bishop, holding a scroll in one hand and Cross in the other, sometimes stepping on the Pope or having the Pope kneeling before him
Markella	Martyr's palm, martyr's cross, scroll, (occasionally) being beheaded by her father.
Marko Krizin	Martyr's palm
Marta Anna Wiecka	Religious habit
Martha	broom, keys, tarasque, aspergillum, dragon^{[a]}
Martial	bishop raising the dead to life
Martin de Porres	broom, a cat, dog and a mouse eating from the same plate^{[b]}
Martin of Tours	geese; armament of a Roman soldier, sharing his cloak with a beggar^{[a]}
Martina of Rome	palm of martyrdom
Martyrs of Libya	crown of martyrdom, orange jumpsuits, martyr's palm, crucifix
Martyrs of Albania	Palm
Martyrs of Algeria	Palm of martyrdom, Trappist habit
Martyrs of Jasenovac	Profession of faith, dove, martyr's palm, religious habit
Martyrs of Laos	Palm, Priest's cassock
Martyrs of Natal	Priest's attire, Palm branch
Martyrs of Prague	Franciscan habit, Palm branch
Martyrs of the Spanish Civil War	Crown of martyrdom, Martyr's palm, rosary
Martyrs of Zenta	Priest's cassock, Palm branch
Mary de Cervellione	Lily, boat, stormy sea
Mary Elizabeth Lange	Religious habit, rosary
Mary Frances Schervier	Religious habit
Mary Magdalene	Western: alabaster box of ointment; a skull on top of a book. Eastern: container of ointment (as a myrrhbearer), or holding a red egg (symbol of the resurrection); embracing the feet of Christ after the Resurrection
Mary of Bethany	Woman holding an alabaster jar of perfume (myrrh) and holding her hair
Mary of Jesus de León y Delgado	Dominican Religious habit, a rosary, the image of the Baby Jesus with laurel
Massacre of the Innocents	Martyr's palm, Crown of martyrdom
Materiana	crown; widow's robe.
Maurus	scales, spade, crutch^{[a]}
Menas of Crete	two camels^{[a]}
Mercurius	Martyr's palm
Mateo Elías Nieves Castillo	Cassock
Matilda	purse, alms^{[a]}
Matilde Salem	brooch with the image of the Immaculate Conception
Matteo Ricci	Chinese Confucian scholar robes holding a crucifix and book
Matthias the Apostle	axe, Christian martyrdom
Mattia Ciccarelli	Augustinian habit, Eucharist
Mattia de Nazarei	Religious habit, book
Maurice	soldier in armour, soldier being executed with other soldiers, sub-saharan African in full armour, banner with red cross (the badge of the Order of Saints Maurice and Lazarus)^{[a]}
Maurice Tornay	Augustinian habit
Maurice-Marie-Matthieu Garrigou	Cassock, Zucchetto
Maurus of Parentium	bishop holding the crown of martyrdom in his hand
Maurus, Pantalemon and Sergius	Mauro is represented in robes of a bishop with a book. Sergio and Pantaleone, in military attire, on a horse, while raising a flag with red cross on a white background
Maximilian Kolbe	Franciscan habit, the Rycerz Niepokalanej, Nazi concentration prison uniform, Nazi concentration camp badge, crucifix, rosary, and a palm of martyrdom
Maximin of Trier	depicted receiving Saint Athanasius at Trier; book; model of a church; bear at his side; commanding a bear to carry his things.
Maximus of Turin	depicted as a bishop pointing at a roe
Mechtilde	Scales and a sword, heart, book and dove
Medardus	Episcopal garments
Meinrad of Einsiedeln	two ravens
Melchor Chyliński	Franciscan habit
Menas of Egypt	Christian Martyrdom, man with his hands cut off and his eyes torn out; man with two camels; young knight with a halberd, an anachronistic depiction of his time in the Roman army
Menina Izildinha	Flowers
Mercè Prat i Prat	Teresian habit, Palm
Michael (archangel)	Archangel; treading on a dragon, carrying a banner, scales, sword, and weighing souls^{[a]}
Michael de Sanctis	depicted kneeling before an altar where the Blessed Sacrament is exposed
Michael Hồ Đình Hy	Hanfu, Song official headwear, Martyr's palm, Dadao
Michael J. McGivney	Priest attire, Books, Rosary
Michał Giedroyć	crucifix
Michał Sopoćko	Cassock
Michel Garicoïts	Priest's attire
Michele Carcano	cross, skull
Michelina of Pesaro	Widow, pilgrim, and Franciscan tertiaries
Miguel Febres Cordero	Priest's cassock
Miguel Pro	Execution in a cruciform posture, Crown of martyrdom, Martyr's palm, rosary
Mildrith	Princess's crown, Abbess' crozier, hind
Miliau	depicted afs a cephalophore; in royal garb
Minias of Florence	Depicted as a young prince holding a crown; crowned with a rod and palm; crowned with a lily, rod and palm; carrying his severed head^{[c]}
Miroslav Bulešić	Book, Palm, Priest's attire
Modomnoc	bees
Monica	girdle, tears^{[a]}
Monon	Standing with a cow.
Moses	Tablets of the Law
Mother Teresa	Missionaries of Charity habit, rosary
Moura	Martyr's palm

=== N ===
N
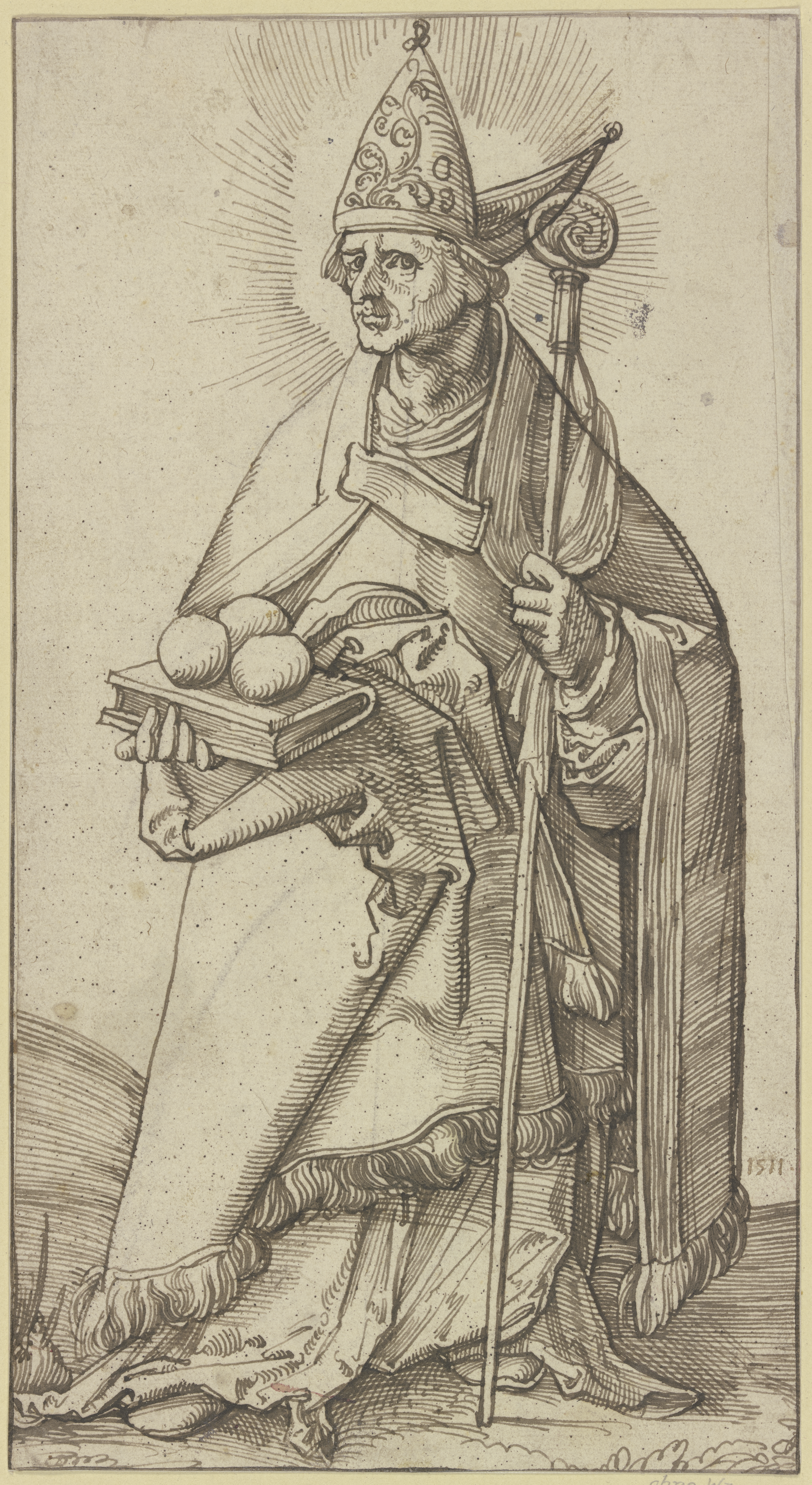
Three golden balls as attributes of Saint Nicholas

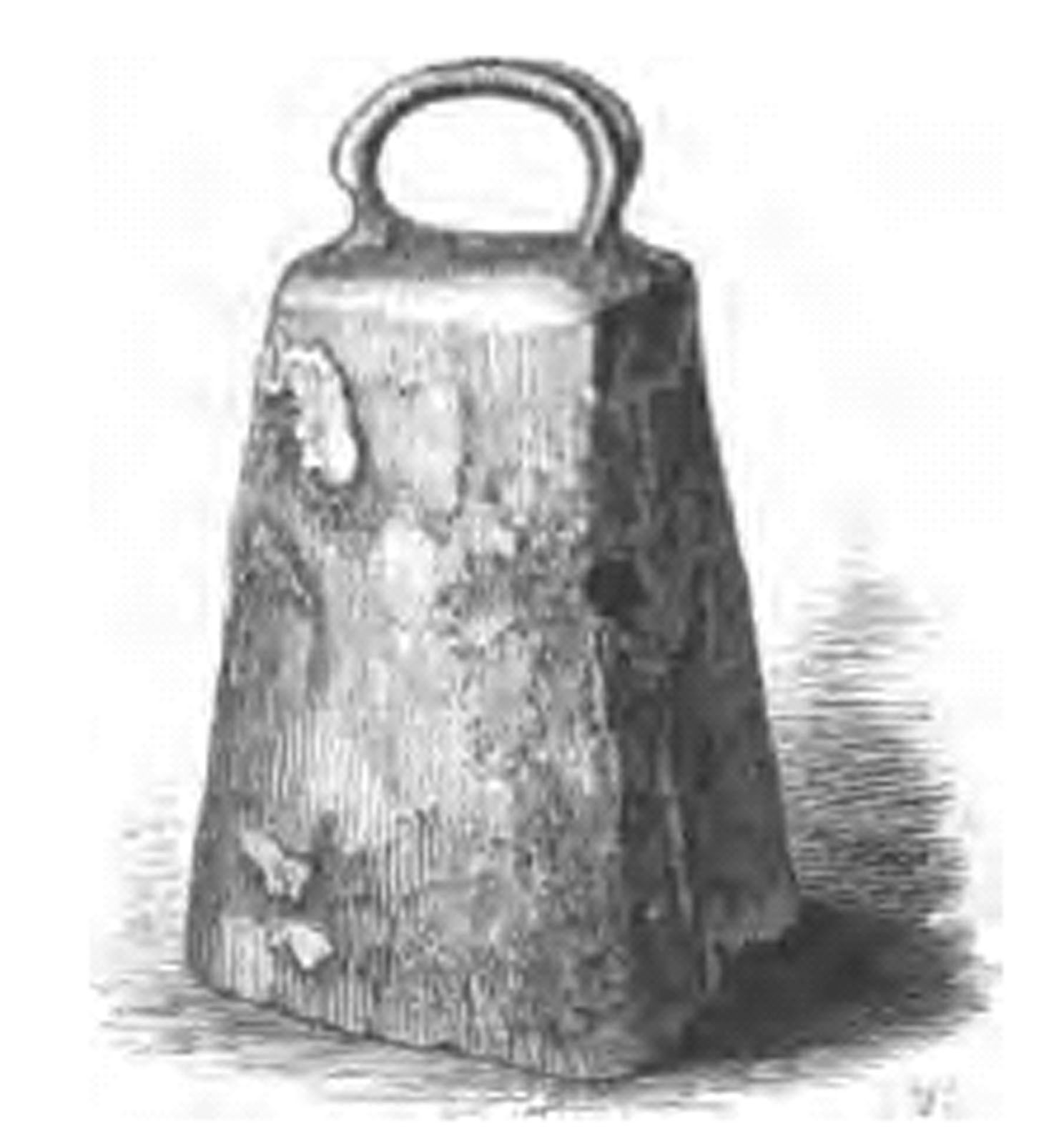
Bell of Saint Ninian

Saint	Symbol
Nano Nagle	holding a lantern
Narcissus of Jerusalem	Depicted as a bishop holding a thistle in blossom; pitcher of water near him, an angel depicted carrying his soul to Heaven
Nazarius and Celsus	depicted as a man and boy walking on the sea
Neagoe Basarab	Crown, Cross, Sword, Scroll, Hesychast
Nectarios of Aegina	Wearing a sakkos, omophorion worn about his shoulder, holding a book and epanokalimavkion
Neot	fish^{[a]}
Nestor of Magydos	Vested as a bishop holding a martyr's cross
Nicasius, Quirinus, Scubiculus, and Pientia	Dragon (Quirinus)
Nicolás Factor	Franciscan habit, skull, fire ^{[b]}
Nicholas I	rooster
Nicholas of Myra	Vested as a Bishop. In Eastern Christianity, wearing an omophorion and holding a Gospel Book. Sometimes shown with Jesus Christ over one shoulder, holding a Gospel Book, and with the Theotokos over the other shoulder, holding an omophorion, holding three golden balls or coins, crozier, anchor, boat, children, wheat sheaves^{[a]}
Nicholas of Tolentino	Augustinian holding a bird on a plate in the right hand and a crucifix on the other hand; holding a basket of bread, giving bread to a sick person; holding a lily or a crucifix garlanded with lilies; with a star above him or on his breast
Nicodemus the Hagiorite	Long white beard, monastic garb, often writing on a scroll, or in a book
Nicola da Forca Palena	Franciscan habit
Nicola da Gesturi	Capuchin habit
Nicola Mazza	Priest's attire, Children at his side
Nicola Paglia	Dominican habit
Nicola Saggio	Crucifix, habit of the Minims
Nicolás Factor	Franciscan habit, Skull, Fire
Nicolò Cortese	Franciscan habit
Nicolò Politi	Staff
Nicolò Rusca	Crucifix
Nicomedes	club set with spikes
Nikolaj Velimirović	Vested as a bishop
Nikolaus Gross	Palm branch
Nilus the Younger	holding an oil lamp
Nimatullah Kassab	Religious habit, prayer rope
Ninian	Episcopal, clogrinny, or the Bell of St. Ninian^{[a]}
Nino	Grapevine cross
Ninnoc	stag at her feet
Nonnosus	oil lamp or hanging lamp, rock, depicted sometimes as a Benedictine monk (in black habit) or as an abbot with a staff or as a deacon wearing a dalmatic
Norbert of Xanten	monstrance, cross with two beams^{[a]}
Notburga	Ear of corn, or flowers and a sickle or a scythe in her hand
Notker the Stammerer	A rod; Benedictine habit; book in one hand and a broken rod in the other with which he strikes the Devil
Nuno Álvares Pereira	Knight, sword, fleur-de-lis, Carmelite Habit,
Nunzio Sulprizio	Rosary, Anvil

=== O ===
O
Saint Olaf with axe in a viking boat

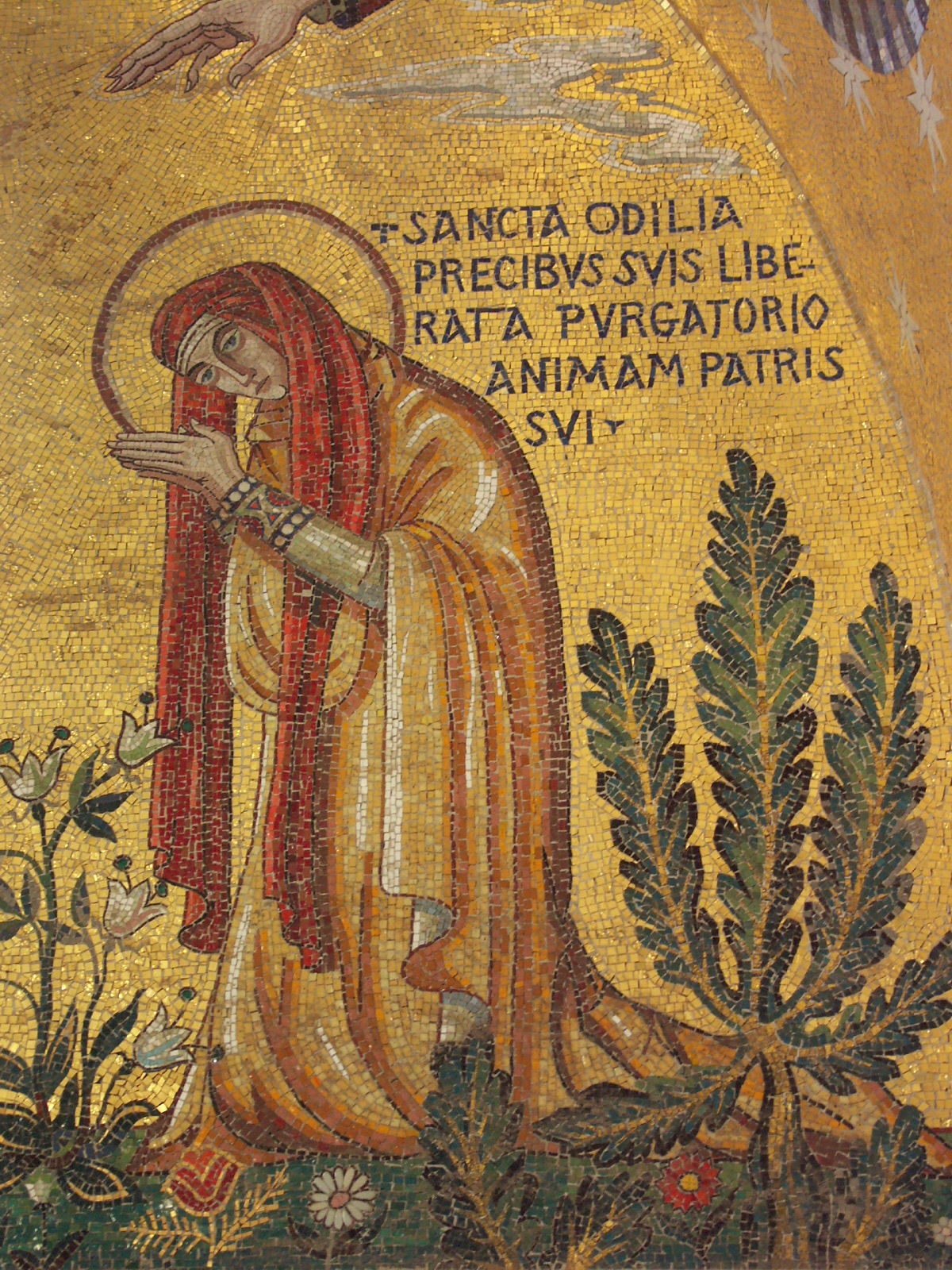
Saint Odile with larkspur

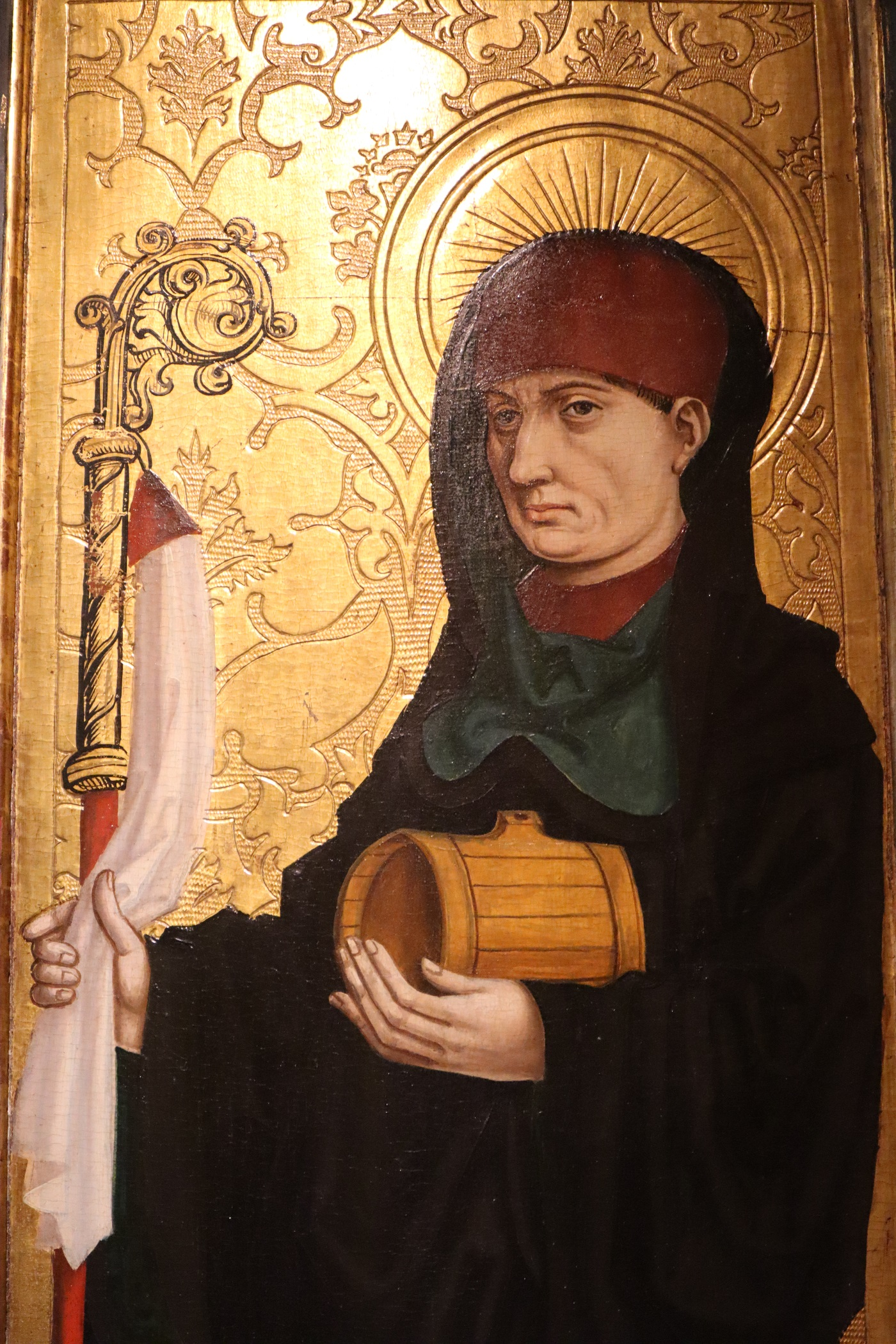
Othmar with a wine barrel

Saint	Symbol
Obitius	depicted as a warrior on horseback
Oda of Scotland	wearing a long blue gown with one shoulder bare, carrying a staff or a book; magpie on her hand and a crown under her feet^{[a]}
Odile of Alsace	Abbess praying before an altar; woman with a book on which lie two eyes
Odo of Novara	Carthusian habit, Staff
Olaf of Norway	crown, axe, standing in a Viking boat^{[a]}
Olinto Marella	Priest's cassock
Onesiphorus	Martyr's palm
Onuphrius	as a hermit dressed only in long hair and a loincloth of leaves; angel bringing him the Eucharist or bread; hermit with a crown at his feet
Opportuna of Montreuil	carrying an abbess's crozier and a casket of relics. She may also be shown with the Virgin appearing at her deathbed or as a princess with a basket of cherries and a fleur-de-lys
Origen	self-castration, monastic habit
Orontius of Lecce	Episcopal attire; smashes pagan idols at his feet
Osanna of Mantua	Dominican tertiary wearing a crown of thorns and surrounded by rays of light; Dominican with the devil under her feet; a broken heart with a crucifix springing from it; a lily; two angels, one with a lily, one with a cross
Osgyth	Depicted carrying her own head, represented in art with a stag behind her and a long key hanging from her girdle, or otherwise carrying a key and a sword crossed, a device which commemorates St. Peter, St. Paul and St. Andrew
Oswald of Northumbria	king in crown, carrying sceptre and orb, ciborium, sword, palm-branch, and/or with his raven
Othmar	Crozier and wine barrel

=== P ===
P
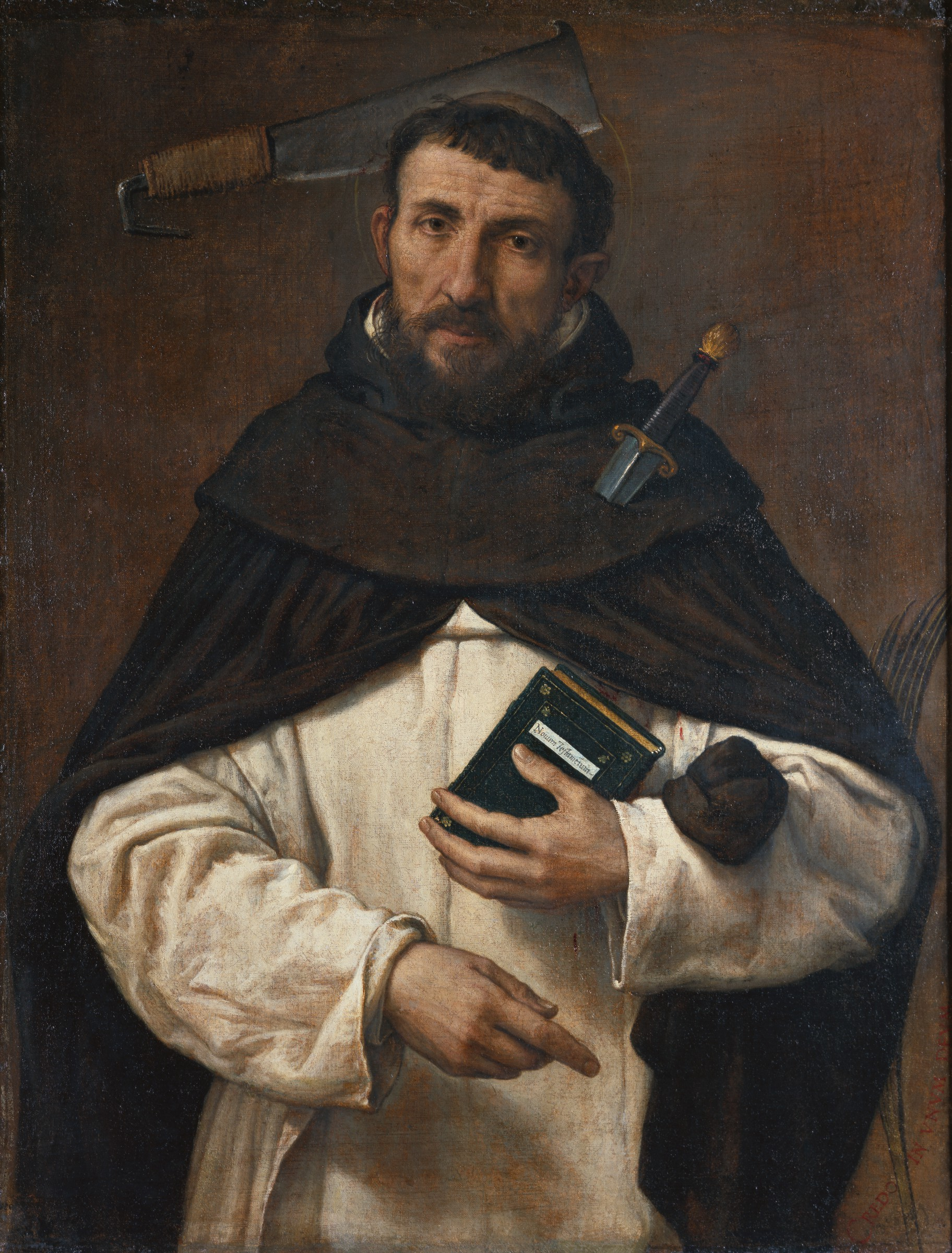
Saint Peter Martyr with an axe stuck in his head

Article title	Attributes
Pachomius the Great	Hermit in a garb, Hermit crossing the Nile on the back of a crocodile
Pacificus of Ceredano	Franciscan habit
Pacificus of San Severino	Franciscan habit
Padre Pio	Stigmata, Franciscan habit, miracles, and sacerdotal vestments
Palladius of Embrun	episcopal attire
Pancras of Rome	Roman legion armour, martyr's palm branch, book, quill, sword
Pancras of Taormina	with yellowing grey hair, vested as a bishop, holding a martyr's cross in his right hand, and a Gospel book in his left
Pancras	sword, martyr's palm^{[a]}
Pantaenus	lecturing from a pulpit
Pantaleon	nailed hands^{[a]}
Paola Gambara Costa	Franciscan habit
Paolo Manna	Priest's attire
Paraskevi of Iconium	Robe of martyrdom, vessel of perfume, Eastern cross, scroll
Pardus the Hermit	lion
Paschal Baylón	Monstrance, Franciscan habit, standing before the Eucharist
Patrick	cross, harp, serpent, baptismal font, demons, shamrock^{[a]}
Patroclus of Troyes	depicted as a warrior pointing to a fish with a pearl in its mouth
Paul the Apostle	sword, book or scroll, horse, long, pointed beard, and balding backwards from forehead.^{[a]}
Paul VI	Papal vestments, Papal tiara, Pallium
Paul Chong Hasang	Hanbok and gat, crucifix, palm of martyrdom
Paul Miki	palm, cross, spear
Paul of Taganrog	Monastic habit, Prosphora
Paul of the Cross	Passionist habit, crucifix
Paul of Thebes	Two lions, palm tree, raven
Paula Montal Fornés	Religious habit
Paula of Rome	Depicted as a Hieronymite abbess with a book, depicted as a pilgrim, often with Jerome and Eustochium, depicted prostrate before the cave at Bethlehem, depicted embarking in a ship, while a child calls from the shore, weeping over her children, with the instruments of the Passion, holding a scroll with Saint Jerome's epistle Cogite me Paula, with a book and a black veil fringed with gold, or with a sponge in her hand.
Pauline Mallinckrodt	Religious habit
Pausicacus of Synada	Vested as a bishop
Pedro Armengol	Mercedarian habit, Rope|Palm of martyrdom
Pedro Calungsod	martyr's palm, spear, bolo, doctrina christiana book, rosary, christogram, crucifix^{[a]}
Pedro de Arbués	Religious habit, Palm, Sword
Pelágio Sauter	Priest's attire
Penitent thief	Wearing a loincloth and either holding his cross or being crucified, sometimes depicted in Paradise
Pere Tarrés i Claret	Priest's cassock
Peregrina Mogas Fontcuberta	Religious habit
Peregrine (martyr)	Chi Rho on his chest, in a dungeon with the rack, the scourge, clubs or fire's flames
Peregrine Laziosi	one leg covered in a cancerous sore, a staff
Peregrine of Auxerre	converting pagans, overturning idols, founding Auxerre cathedral, sometimes in the dress of a pilgrim in reference to his name (peregrinus means pilgrim in Latin), snake
Perpetuus	Depicted as a bishop directing the building of a church. Sometimes the sick may be shown being healed at his tomb or as his relics are carried in procession
Petroc	Wolf, stag, church
Peter of Saint Joseph de Betancur	bell, Franciscan habit and the lance from the Shepherd's leap.^{[a]}
Petar Zimonjić	Vested as a bishop
Peter and Fevronia of Murom	crown, sword, dove, scroll, white daisy, monastic habit
Peter Chanel	Gentle, kind, encouraging
Peter Damian	represented as a cardinal bearing a knotted rope in his hand, also as a pilgrim holding a papal Bull, Cardinal's hat, Benedictine habit
Peter de Regalado	Flames bursting from his heart
Peter Donders	Priest's attire
Peter Fourier	Chaplet, pictures of the Virgin Mary
Peter Friedhofen	Priest's attire
Peter González	Dominican holding a blue candle or a candle with a blue flame, Dominican lying on his cloak which is spread over hot coals, Dominican holding fire in his bare hands, Dominican catching fish with his bare hands, Dominican beside the ocean, often holding or otherwise protecting a ship
Peter Julian Eymard	Eucharist, Monstrance, Eucharistic Adoration, Eucharistic Congress, Cope, Humeral Veil, Congregation of the Blessed Sacrament, Servants of the Blessed Sacrament, Real Presence
Peter of Alcántara	Franciscan habit
Peter of Jesus Maldonado	priestly vestments, stole, palm, monstrance, Eucharist, Nocturnal Adoration pendant, Knight of Columbus pendant
Peter of Krutitsy	Vested as a bishop, right hand raised in blessing
Peter of Saint Joseph de Betancur	Holds a walking stick and bell. Occasionally it also represents a spear canary pastor.
Peter of Verona	Dominican with a hatchet in his head or a severe head wound, or writing the words "Credo in Deum" as he dies
Peter the Aleut	portrayed as an Aleut youth, wearing a traditional gut parka
Peter the Wonderworker	Vested as a bishop, holding a Gospel Book, right hand raised in blessing, making the Christogram ICXC
Peter To Rot	Martyr's palm, crucifix worn as a necklace, sometimes holding a globus cruciger
Petronius of Bologna	Depicted as a bishop holding a model of Bologna in his hand
Petronilla	broom and/or a set of keys, dolphin^{[a]}
Pharaildis	shown with a goose at her feet
Philip Benizi de Damiani	Habit of the Servite Order, Lily, book, papal tiara
Philip II, Metropolitan of Moscow	Vested as a hierarch with omophorion, holding a Gospel Book, with his right hand raised in blessing. Iconographically, he is depicted with a medium-sized dark beard with flecks of grey
Philip of Jesus	spear, palm branch, cross
Philip the Apostle	Red Martyr, Elderly, bearded man, holding a basket of loaves and a Tau cross
Philomena	martyr's palm, crown of red and white flowers, orange or white robes, arrows, anchor, candle, bloodied sword, sometimes a partially slit throat
Philip Neri	white lily^{[a]}
Piatus of Tournai	holding top part of his skull
Pierina Morosini	Martyr's palm, Lily flower, Rosary
Pierre Bonhomme	Cassock
Pierre Vigne	Crucifix, Staff
Pierre-Adrien Toulorge	White habit, palm
Pierre-François Jamet	Cassock, Legion of Honor
Pierre-Joseph Cassant	Cassock, Trappist habit
Pierre-René Rogue	Palm
Pietro Bonilli	Cassock
Pietro Casani	Priest's cassock, Crucifix
Pietro Corradini	Franciscan habit
Pietro Gambacorta	Franciscan habit
Pietro Geremia	Dominican habit
Pietro Pettinaio	Comb, finger on the lips for silence, Franciscan habit
Pino Puglisi	Priest's cassock
Piotr Kosiba	Franciscan habit
Pishoy	Monk carrying Jesus, Monk washing the feet of Jesus
Pius V	Papal vestments, Papal tiara, Dominican habit
Pius VII	Papal attire, Papal tiara, Benedictine habit
Pius IX	Papal attire, Papal tiara
Pius XII	Papal vestments, Papal tiara, Pectoral cross
Pius of Saint Aloysius	Passionist habit
Placide Viel	Religious habit
Placidus	being rescued from drowning
Poemen	hermit, ascetic
Polycarp	Wearing the pallium, holding a book representing his Epistle to the Philippians
Pompeia of Langoat	Queen holding a distaff, book at her feet
Pompilio Maria Pirrotti	Priest's cassock, Crucifix
Pontianus of Spoleto	young man holding a sword
Porphyry of Gaza	vested as a bishop with omophorion, often holding a Gospel Book, with his right hand raised in blessing
Potitus	martyr's palm
Primus and Felician	As portrayed at their martyrdom: St Felician is nailed to a tree and St Primus is forced to swallow molten lead
Princess Elisabeth of Hesse and by Rhine (1864–1918)	Religious habit
Priscilla and Aquila	Martyr's crown, Martyr's palm, martyrs' crosses
Procopius of Sázava	devil ploughing before him, depicted as an abbot with a book and whip, devil at his feet, with a stag (or hind) near him, with Saints Adelbert, Ludmila, and Vitus, hermit with a skull and a girdle of leaves
Prosdocimus	Depicted as a bishop holding a jar. Sometimes he is shown with Saint Justina of Padua to whom he was a spiritual father according to a medieval source. He may be depicted wearing a Benedictine habit.
Prosper of Reggio	Book, model of Reggio Emilia, episcopal dress
Protus and Hyacinth	Depicted as two young men, holding the crowns of martyrdom
Publius	Shown with a lion next to him
Pudentiana	Oil lamp, laurel wreath (for Christ)

== See also ==
- Christian symbolism
- Arma Christi
- Animals in Christian art
- Plants in Christian iconography
- Degrees of martyrdom
