= Saint Peter (Sinai) =

6th-century painting

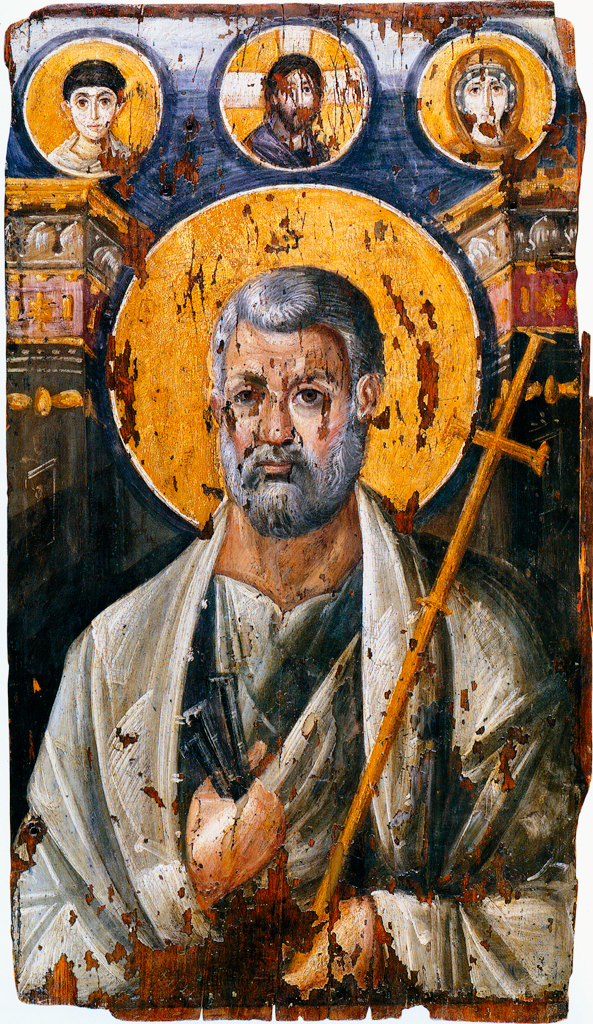
- Artist: Unknown
- Completion date: 6th century AD
- Medium: Encaustic on wood
- Dimensions: 93.4 cm × 53.7 cm × 1.25 cm (36.8 in × 21.1 in × 0.49 in)
- Condition: Good condition
- Location: Saint Catherine's Monastery, Sinai, Egypt

Saint Peter is a sixth-century encaustic icon depicting Saint Peter the Apostle, housed in Saint Catherine's Monastery in Sinai, Egypt. It is one of the oldest surviving icons of Saint Peter.

The apostle Peter "is shown holding the keys of the Kingdom in his right hand and in his left hand a staff surmounted by the [martyr's] cross." He is depicted with a low forehead, thick, short hair and a short beard. Despite the apparent frontal view of the head, there is a slight turn of the body. Above the head of the apostle is a Deesis with the image of Christ, the Virgin Mary and John the Evangelist. Their half-figures are enclosed in medallions. The Virgin Mary and John the Evangelist do not correspond with their canonical depictions, so it is possible that the icon is a votive image depicting a mother with her child flanking Christ. ￼
