= María Catalina Irigoyen Echegaray =

Spanish Dominican nun

Blessed María Catalina Irigoyen Echegaray

Religious
- Born: 25 November 1848; Pamplona, Navarra, Kingdom of Spain
- Died: 10 October 1918 (aged 69); Madrid, Kingdom of Spain
- Venerated in: Roman Catholic Church
- Beatified: 29 October 2011, Almudena Cathedral, Madrid, Spain by Cardinal Angelo Amato
- Feast: 10 October
- Attributes: Religious habit

María Catalina Irigoyen Echegaray (25 November 1848 - 10 October 1918) - in religious María Desposorios - was a Spanish Roman Catholic professed religious and a professed member from the Siervos de María Ministros de los Enfermos. From her adolescence she worked to comfort and tend to the old and ill and her religious call manifested while doing this work; she entered the order where her work increased.

Her beatification was celebrated on 29 October 2011 in Madrid.

== Life ==
María Catalina Irigoyen Echegaray was born on 25 November 1848 as the last of eight children to Tiburcio Irigoyen (his house was related to Francis Xavier); she was a twin with the seventh child. Two older sisters were Joaquina and Cipriana who married. Her baptism was celebrated on 26 November at the Pamplona Cathedral.

She began to visit the old and homeless in hospitals since she was thirteen and it was during this noble work that her call to the religious life prompted her to enter a religious order who shared this objective. Her First Communion was celebrated on 26 November 1880 alongside fellow students who all studied under the Dominican nuns.

Her mother died on 17 December 1868 and her father died not long after this on 15 February 1871. In 1878 she requested to enter a religious order and so she entered the novitiate of the Siervos de María Ministros de los Enfermos on 31 December 1881. It was during her time among her new religious that she became acquainted with Maria Soledad Torres y Acosta. Her novitiate in Madrid culminated on 12 March 1882 with the reception of the habit and the assumption of her new religious name. She made her initial vows on 14 May 1883 and she made her solemn profession on 15 July 1889.

The nun died from tuberculosis of the bone on 10 October 1918 in Madrid which she had been diagnosed with back in 1913.

== Beatification ==
The beatification cause began in an informative process spanning from 15 January 1944 until 5 July 1945. Her spiritual records and other writings received theological approval on 4 April 1948. The formal introduction to the cause came on 14 February 1962 under Pope John XXIII and she became titled as a Servant of God. An apostolic process was also held in Madrid from 21 February 1963 until 18 January 1964 while the Congregation for Rites later validated the processes on 15 January 1966. The Congregation for the Causes of Saints and their consultants approved this cause on 10 December 1980 as did the C.C.S. alone on 24 February 1981. Pope John Paul II titled her as Venerable on 30 March 1981 after confirming her heroic virtue.

The process for a miracle took place in La Paz in Bolivia from 9–21 June 2006 and concerned the healing of a surgeon from a cerebral complication. The C.C.S. validated the process on 31 March 2007 and a medical panel of experts approved this on 20 May 2010. Theologians also approved the cause on 5 October 2010 as did the C.C.S. on 15 February 2011. Pope Benedict XVI approved the beatification after confirming the miracle on 2 April 2011.

Cardinal Angelo Amato presided over the beatification on the pope's behalf on 29 October 2011. In his remarks the cardinal praised her "generous care and human closeness" to the ill. Cardinal Antonio María Rouco Varela and Cardinal Antonio Cañizares Llovera were also in attendance at the beatification as was Archbishop Renzo Fratini. Archbishop Edmundo Abastoflor Montero and Bishop Oscar Aparicio were also in attendance.

The current postulator for the cause is Julia Josefa Castillo Ibáñez.
