= Sisters, Servants of Mary =

Servants of Mary, Ministers to the Sick
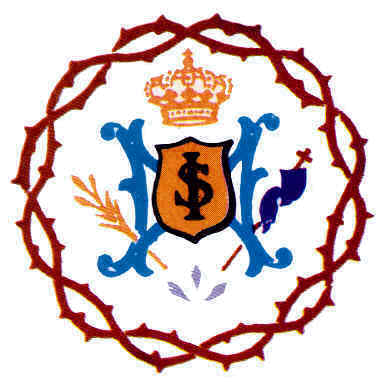
- Shield of the congregation

Total population
- 1,628 (2011)

Founder
- María Soledad Torres y Acosta

Regions with significant populations
- Europe, Latin America, United States, Philippines, Cameroon

Website
- Servants of Mary, Spain; Servants of Mary, USA.
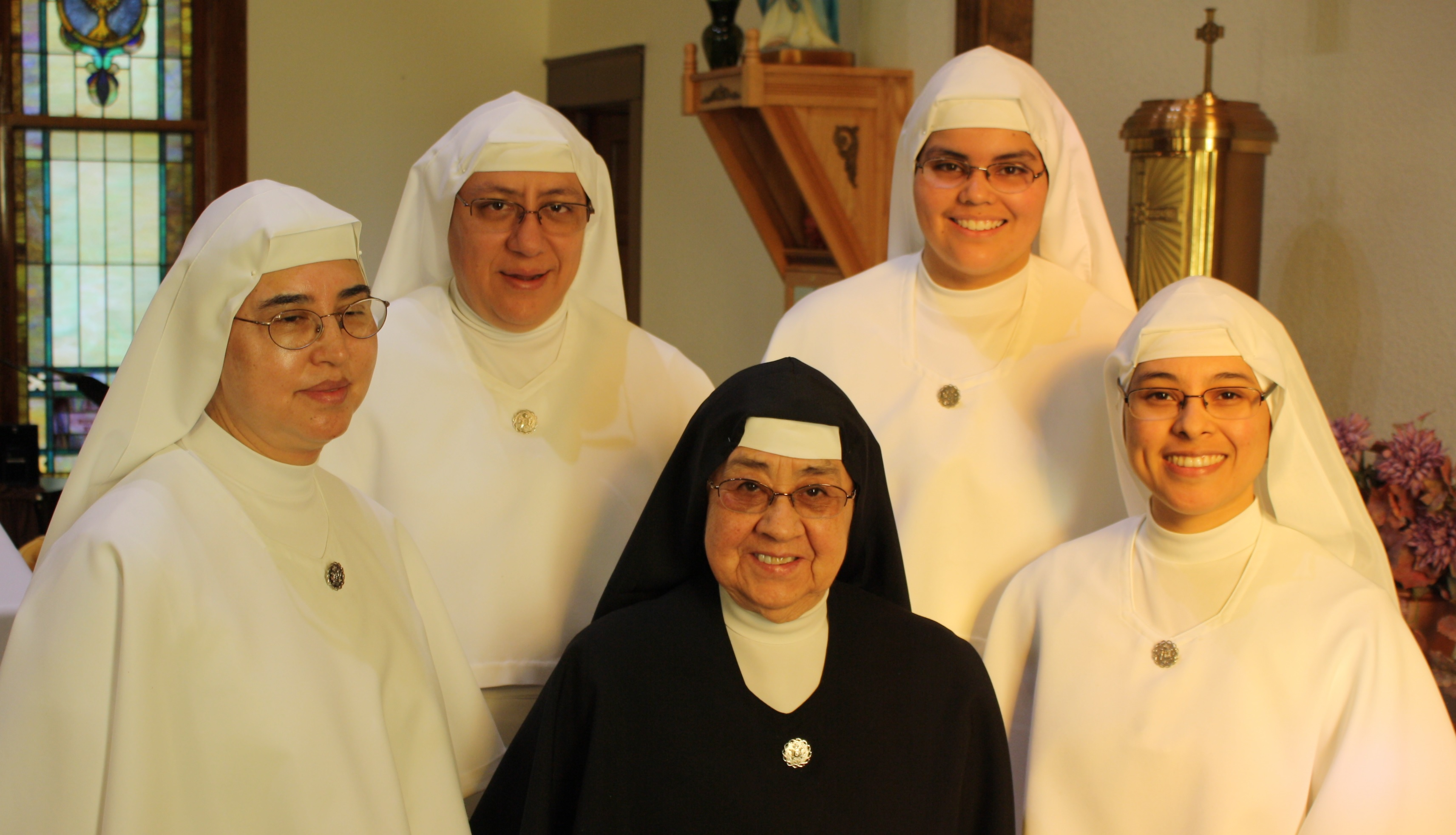

The Servants of Mary, Ministers to the Sick, are a Roman Catholic religious institute of women founded in Madrid, Spain, in 1851 and dedicated to the care of the sick, poor, both in clinics, hospices and through home health nursing. They were founded by Maria Soledad Torres y Acosta who was canonized by Pope Paul VI in 1970. The Religious Sisters of this congregation use the postnominal initials of S.de M.

== History ==
In 1851 Torres y Acosta was a young woman, 25 years of age, who had felt a call to an enclosed religious order. While she was awaiting admittance to a monastery, she helped the Daughters of Charity who had educated her in their care of the poor of the city. At that point, a local priest, Miguel Martínez y Sanz, a member of the Servite Third Order, proposed to her a project he had come to envision of a religious community of women caring for their sick, including visiting them in their homes. Torres agreed to help in the project and on 15 August of that same year, having received the permission of the Bishop of Madrid, on the feast day of the Assumption of Mary, she and the six women who had also felt called to commit themselves to this service were given the religious habit of the new congregation. The sisters, who assist the sick in hospitals and other health centers, but especially in their own homes, became a congregation of pontifical right directly under the Vatican on September 18, 1867.

By 1856 the original seven Sisters had grown to 12. At that point, Martínez, the inspiration of the foundation, left to serve as a missionary in the Spanish colony of Fernando Pó, off the coast of Africa. He recruited half the community of Sisters to accompany him in this mission. At that point, Torres assumed the office of Superior of the community. A rebellion by the Sisters of the community led her to step down, until she was reinstated after an investigation by the new director of the community, an Augustinian Recollect friar, Gabino Sánchez, O.A.R.

The Sisters continued to grow, and Torres opened a new community in Valencia in 1868 and, in 1875, they expanded their service to Havana, Cuba, then still part of Spain. At the time of her death there were 46 communities of Servants of Mary in Europe and Latin America. Today the Sisters also serve in Cameroon, the Philippines and the United States. In 2011, the congregation had about 1628 religious and 114 houses.

== Illustrious Servants ==
- María Soledad Torres y Acosta (1826-1887), saint: founder of the congregation. She was beatified by Pope Pius XII on February 5, 1950 and canonized by Pope Paul VI on January 25, 1970.
- María Catalina Irigoyen Echegaray (1848-1918), blessed: Spanish religious beatified in 2011 by Pope Benedict XVI.
- Aurelia Arambarri Fuente (1866-1936), Blessed, religious martyr during the Spanish Civil War in the 20th century. Heads the group of the Servants of Mary Martyrs in Pozuelo de Alarcón (Madrid). The other blessed are: Agustina Peña Rodríguez (1900-1936), Aurora López González (1850-1936) and Daría Andiarena Sagaseta (1879-1936). Together they were beatified in 2013 by Pope Francis.
- Sanjurjo Soledad Santos (1892-1973), servant of God, religious Puerto Rican whose process of canonization was opened in 2004.
