= Nicolás Factor =

Spanish painter

Blessed Nicolás Factor O.F.M.
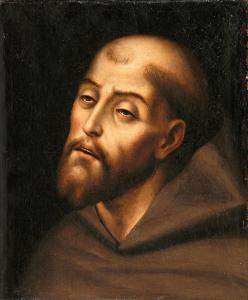
- Painting.

Priest
- Born: 29 June 1520; Valencia, Habsburg Spain
- Died: 23 December 1583 (aged 63); Valencia, Habsburg Spain
- Venerated in: Roman Catholic Church
- Beatified: 27 August 1786, Saint Peter's Basilica, Papal States by Pope Pius VI
- Feast: 23 December
- Attributes: Franciscan habit Skull; Fire
- Patronage: Painters

Nicolás Factor (29 June 1520 – 23 December 1583) was a Spanish Roman Catholic priest and a professed member from the Order of Friars Minor as well as a painter of the Renaissance period. Factor served as an apt preacher across his region - despite wanting to be sent to the foreign missions - and was noted for his practices of self-mortification before he gave sermons.

Pope Pius VI beatified Factor on 27 August 1786.

== Life ==
Nicolás Factor was born in Valencia in Spain on 29 June 1520 as one of five children to a poor tailor.

In his childhood he fasted three times a week and donated all of his untouched food to the poor and also tended to the ill. He also visited a leper hospital. His Moorish maid was so affected with this that she learned about the faith and converted to Roman Catholicism. His father wanted him to follow his path, but Factor wanted to follow his own and so decided to become a priest and a religious.

He entered the Order of Friars Minor on 30 November 1537 and was sometime later ordained as a priest. He painted a range of devotional images. Factor became a sought-after itinerant preacher across his region after his request to go to the foreign missions was denied, and was known for undergoing rather severe self-mortifications before he gave each sermon. He also served as the spiritual director of the Santa Clara convent in Madrid beginning in 1571 at the request of Joan of Habsburg. In April 1582 he relocated to the Santa Caterina convent in Onda and that November moved to another convent in Barcelona.

Factor died after a period of illness on 23 December 1583 after having just returned to Valencia. In 1586 his remains were exhumed for King Philip II - who wished to view them - and his remains were found to be incorrupt.

The first biography of Nicolás Factor, Libro de la vida y obras maravillosas del Padre Fray Pedro Nicolás Factor by Cristóbal Moreno del Camino, was published in the year 1586.

== Beatification ==
Pope Pius VI beatified the late Franciscan on 27 August 1786. The beatification process saw three friends of Factor summoned to provide witness testimonies and the tribunal called upon Paschal Baylón and Louis Betrand as well as Juan de Ribera (whom Factor served).
