= Martyr's cross =

Christian iconographic element

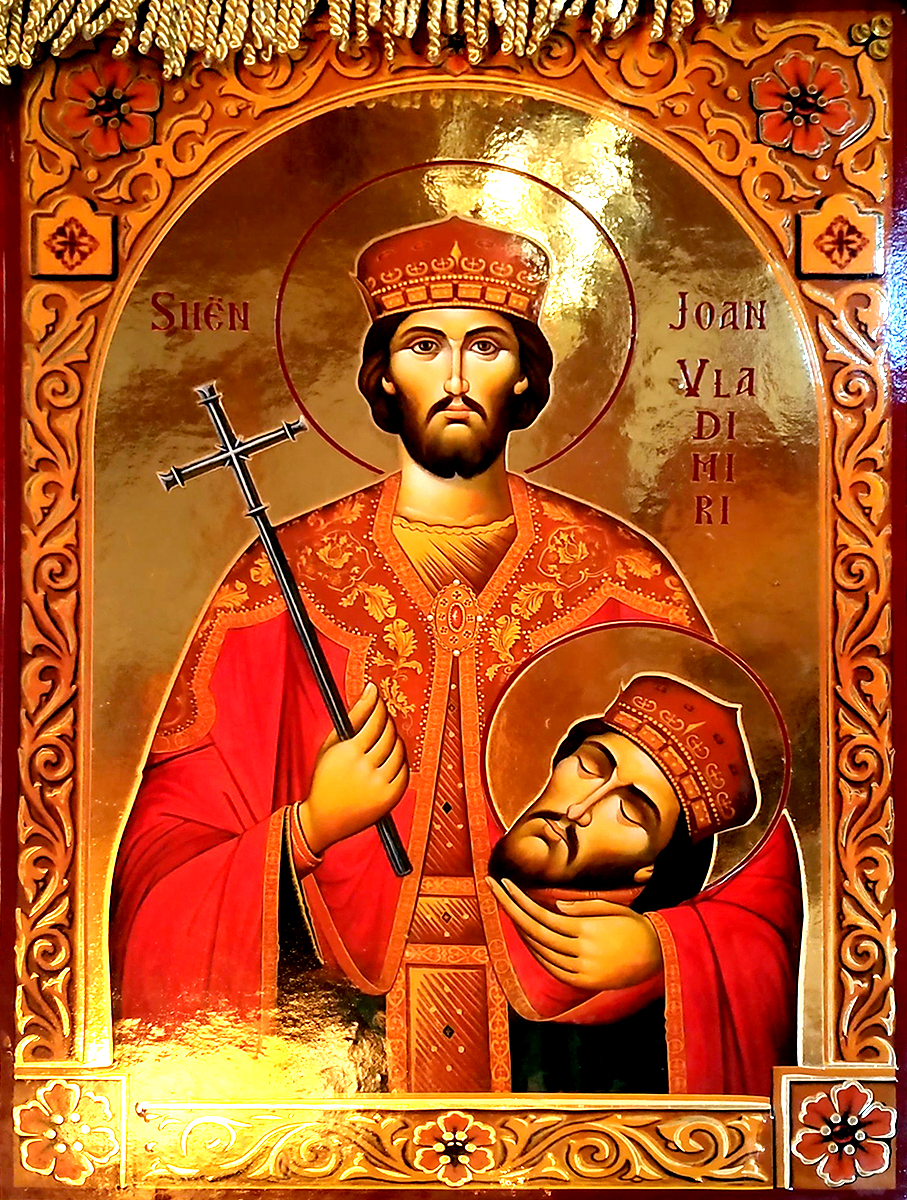
Saint John Vladimir (c. 990 – 22 May 1016), depicted on a contemporary Albanian Orthodox icon in St. Jovan Vladimir's Church, Elbasan, Albania

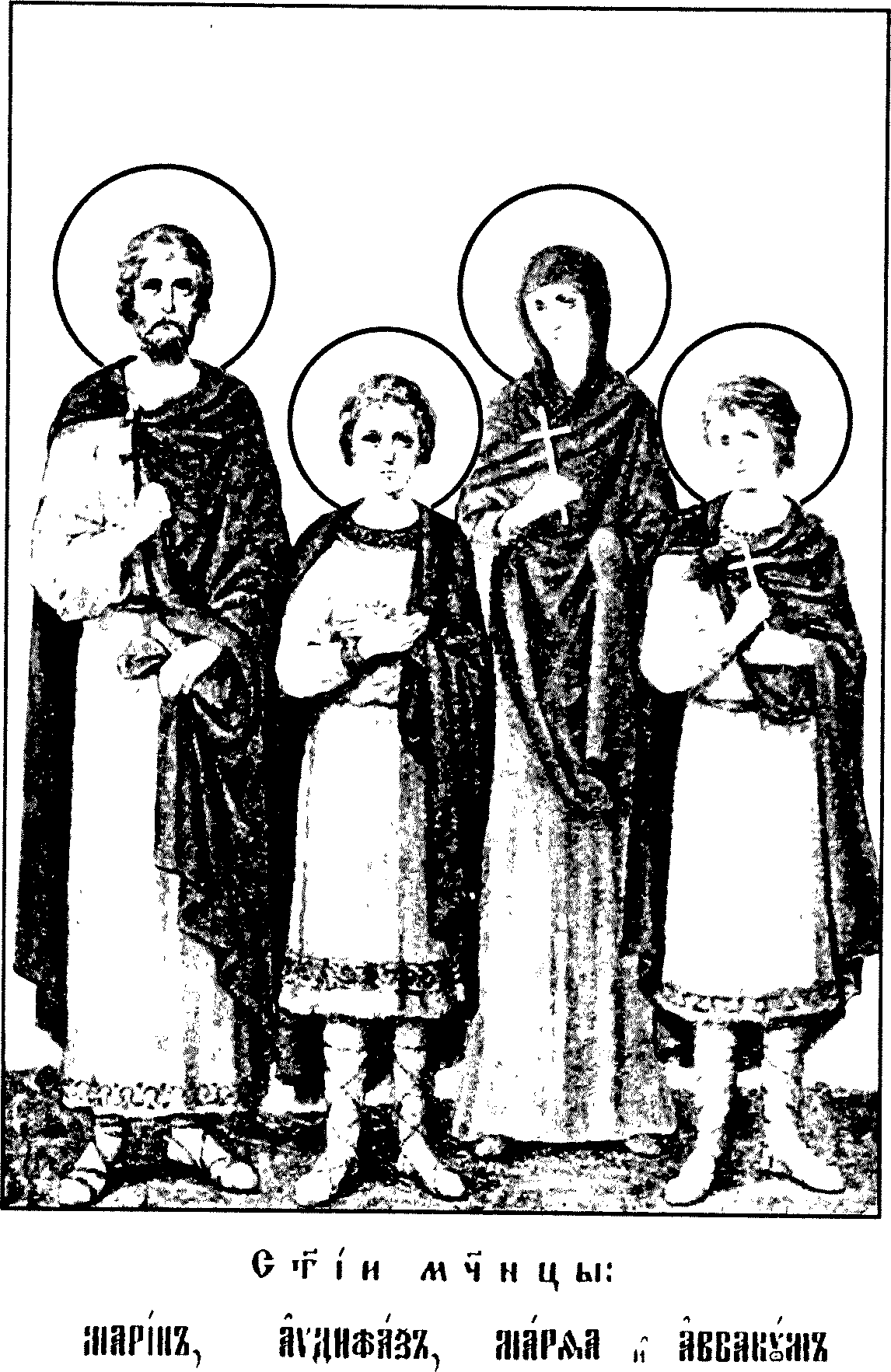
Saints Marius, Martha, Audifax, and Abachum (died 270), depicted in a 1904 Russian Orthodox menaion

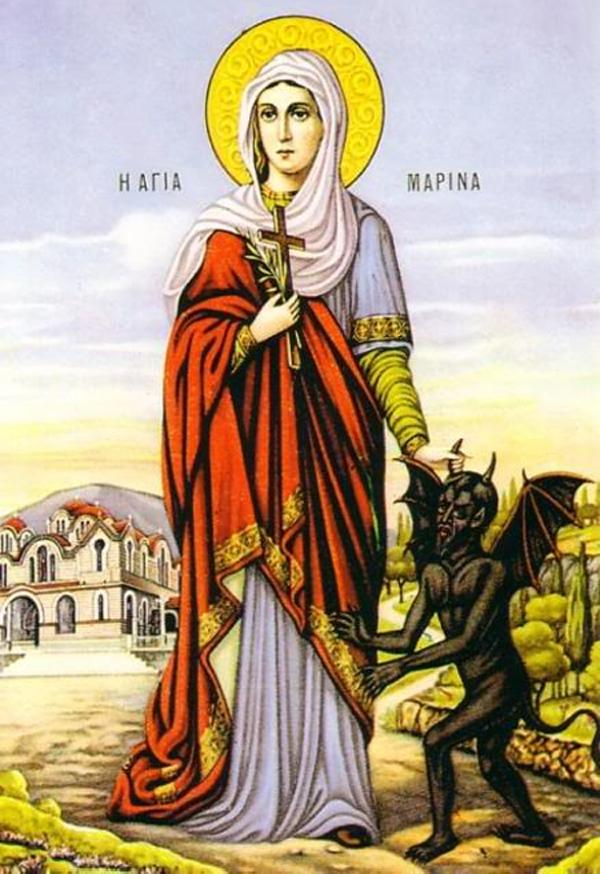
Saint Marina the Great Martyr (c. 289 – c. 304), depicted in a late 19th-century Greek Orthodox icon

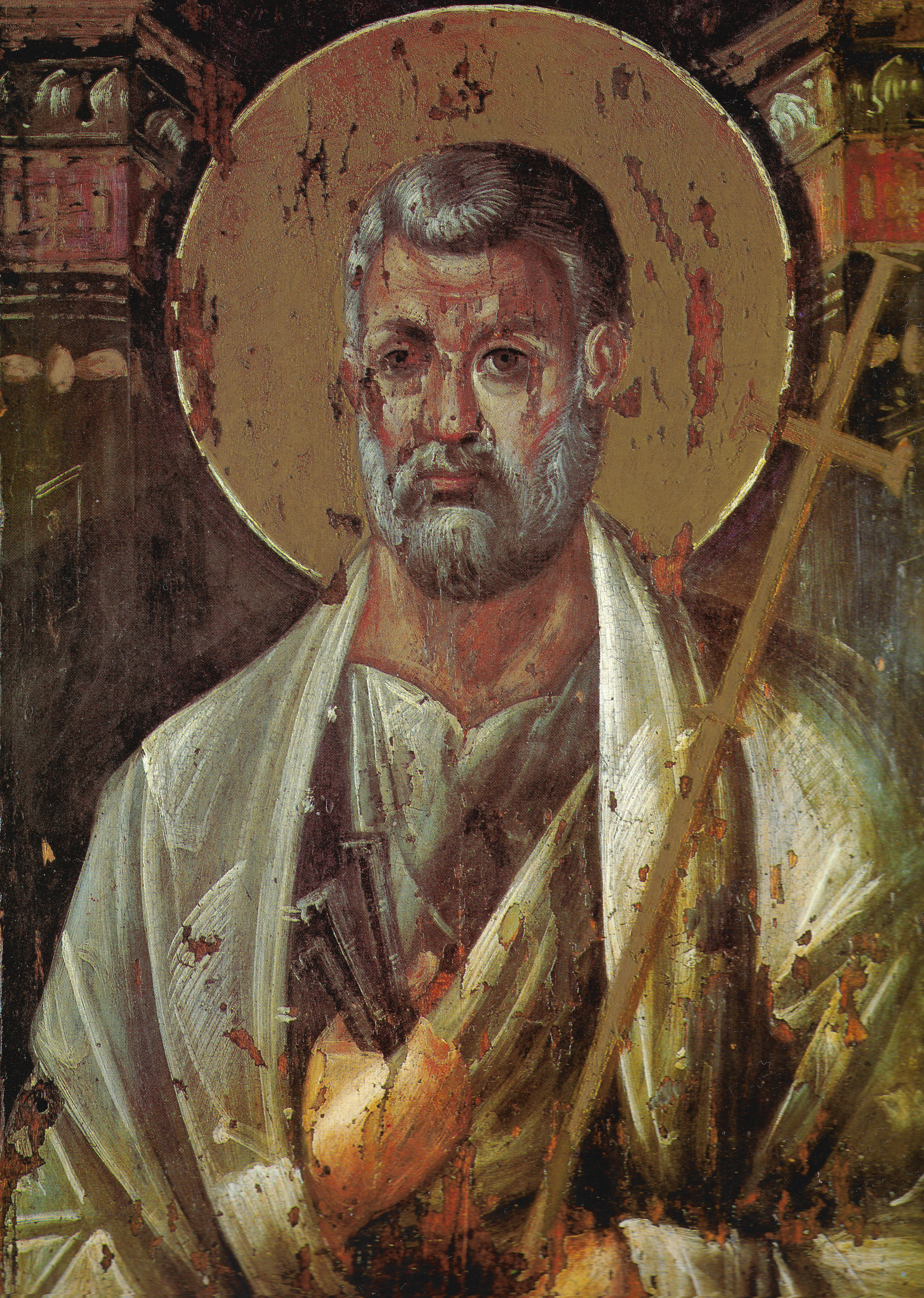
Saint Peter the Apostle (1 BC – AD 64/68), depicted in a sixth-century encaustic icon from Saint Catherine's Monastery, Sinai, Egypt

A martyr's cross is a Christian iconographic element, especially common in Eastern Orthodox iconography, used to indicate that the saint holding it – typically in their right hand – is a martyr.

The martyr's cross first entered Christian iconography during the fifth and sixth centuries, alongside wreaths. Martyrs are not required to be depicted holding one, although it is often the case that they are, especially in the case of lay and new martyrs.

The martyr's cross symbolises the 'burden or suffering endured by martyrs' which 'represent[s] their sacrifice for their faith.'

== See also ==
- Christian cross
- Martyr's crown
- Martyr's palm
