= Maria Soledad Torres y Acosta =

Spanish Roman Catholic professed religious

Saint Maria Soledad Torres y Acosta
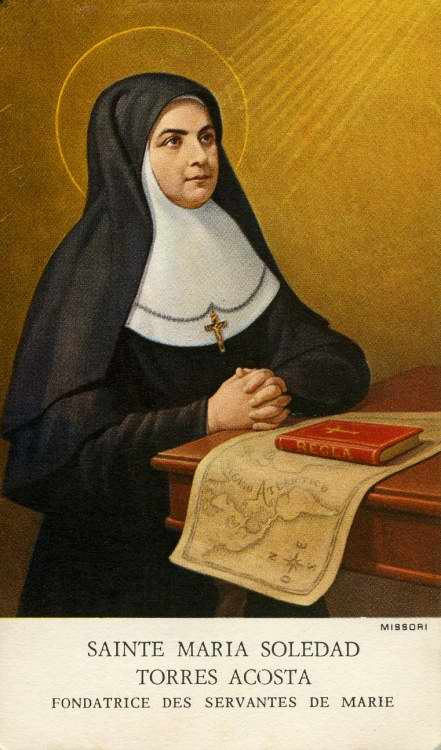

Religious
- Born: 2 December 1826; Madrid, Kingdom of Spain
- Died: 11 October 1887 (aged 60); Madrid, Kingdom of Spain
- Venerated in: Roman Catholic Church
- Beatified: 5 February 1950, Saint Peter's Basilica, Vatican City by Pope Pius XII
- Canonized: 25 January 1970, Saint Peter's Square, Vatican City by Pope Paul VI
- Major shrine: General Motherhouse, Plaza de Chamberí 7, 28210, Madrid, Spain
- Feast: 11 October
- Attributes: Religious habit
- Patronage: Servants of Mary

María Soledad Torres y Acosta (2 December 1826 – 11 October 1887) - born Manuela - was a Spanish Roman Catholic professed religious and the founder of the Servants of Mary. Her apostolic actions - and those of her order - were dedicated towards the nursing of the sick and the poor in the places that it operated in. Torres' childhood consisted of the desire to join the religious life and managed to join a priest's fledgling religious cluster of women after the Dominicans refused to admit her due to her frail constitution. But a series of struggles saw her in a conflicted position of leadership that saw her removed and reinstated twice.

Torres was beatified in 1950 and was later proclaimed a saint in 1970. Her liturgical feast is affixed to the date of her death as is the norm. In 2016, a movie was produced in Spain (original title: Luz de Soledad) that tells her vocation and the struggles during the early years of her life as founder.

== Life ==
Manuela Torres Acosta was born on 2 December 1826 as the second of five children to Francisco Torres and Antonia Acosta in Madrid; she was baptized as "Antonia Bibiana Manuela". Her parents ran a small business in their home near the Plaza de España.

Torres received her education from the Vincentian Sisters and often visited the sick in her neighborhood. The girl also helped at a free school for the poor that the order managed.

In about 1850 she felt called to enter an enclosed religious order and applied to a Dominican convent (not too far from her home) for admission as a secular religious but had to wait until there was room for her. In 1851 she heard of the efforts of Miguel Martínez Sanz (a Third Order Servite) who was the parish priest in Chamberí. Martínez envisioned founding a group of seven women who would minister to the sick and poor of his parish in their own homes since those people often could not afford proper hospitalization. Torres offered herself for this work and (with initial reluctance) Martínez accepted her as the seventh and final member of the order that he wished to establish. On 15 August 1851 she and her six companions committed their lives to this service as a religious group and at that time took the religious habit; she assumed the religious name of "María Soledad".

Martínez in 1856 took with him six of the twelve religious to the missions at Fernando Pó which left Torres as the superior of the order and the sole remaining member of the original group. The remaining religious soon removed her from this office which left the group disorganized and such was the chaos that the local bishop even threatened to dissolve it. The bishop examined Torres and the circumstances of her removal before deciding to re-appoint her as the superior. Torres managed to continue her work with the help of her spiritual director Gabino Sánchez who was an Augustinian Recollect. It was at this time that the order was named as the Servants of Mary. The dedication of the order was brought to the attention of the public after their notable and extensive care of the sick during the cholera epidemic in 1865.

Torres faced several trials throughout her time of leadership in the congregation and soon became the victim of slander and was again removed from her office until Father Sánchez had her reinstated following after another investigation. While establishing a new group of the order in Valencia she faced the liberalizing government which took control of the empire in the Revolution of 1868. It was around this stage that several of the nuns left the order but the order continued to grow in number and in 1875 began to serve in Havana. The order received definitive papal approval in 1876 from Pope Pius IX.

Torres died from pneumonia on 11 October 1887. Her remains were buried in a simple plot around fellow religious of her order but were exhumed and transferred to the chapel of the motherhouse on 18 January 1893; her remains were deemed to be intact and it was reported that her remains exuded a blood-like liquid and a sweet odor. But it was not long after upon another inspection that her remains were limited to bones which meant decomposition had advanced perhaps due to the first exhumation and transferral.

== Canonization ==
Two informative processes opened in Madrid for the collection of documentation in relation to the cause for sainthood. Those documents would prove her saintliness while the theologians summoned to investigate her writings approved them on 21 November 1920. On 26 November 1924 she was titled a Servant of God. The documentation was forwarded to Rome where the Congregation for Rites approved them on 18 December 1929. First an antepreparatory committee met and approved the cause on 28 July 1936 while the preparatory one also approved it on 6 July 1937 as did a general committee on 11 January 1938. The confirmation of her life of heroic virtue allowed for Pius XI to sign a decree on 23 January 1938 that titled Torres as Venerable.

Two miracles were required for her beatification and the C.O.R. validated the two informative processes on 24 April 1942 that investigated the two separate cases. An antepreparatory committee approved these two healings as miracles on 30 November 1943 as did the preparatory one on 31 May 1949 and the general one on 22 November 1949. Pope Pius XII approved both miracles on 27 November 1949 and beatified Torres on 5 February 1950 in Saint Peter's Basilica. One miracle was the cure of Sister Lucia Santiago Allende on November 10, 1915, from grave tuberculosis and severe gastric complications.

Two more miracles were investigated in two separate cognitional processes and the Congregation for the Causes of Saints later approved this on 29 October 1968 after their meeting while passing it onto Pope Paul VI on 10 November 1969 who confirmed them. Paul VI canonized Torres as a saint on 25 January 1970.
