= Marcian of Syracuse =

Catholic saint and first bishop of Syracuse

Saint Marcian of Syracuse
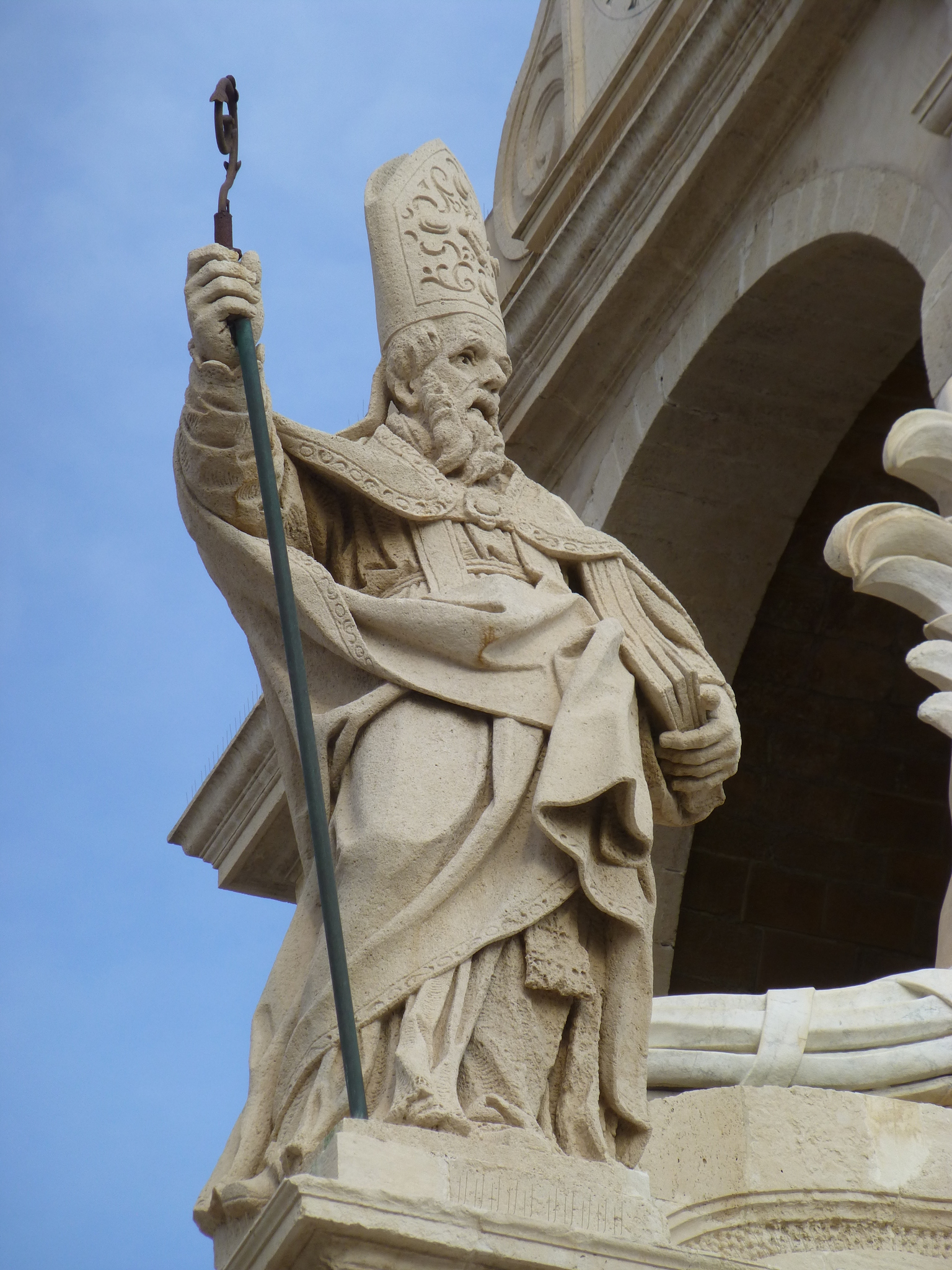
- Statue of St. Marcian in the cathedral of Syracuse

Bishop and martyr
- Born: 1st century Antioch
- Died: Syracuse
- Honored in: Catholic Church; Eastern Orthodox Church
- Feast: October 30 (Catholic Church); Oct. 30 and Feb. 9 (Orthodox Church); June 2 (city of Gaeta); June 14 (archdiocese of Syracuse)
- Patronage: Archdiocese of Syracuse, Gaeta (co-patron with St. Erasmus)

Marcian, or Marcianus (Antioch of Syria, 1st century - Syracuse), was a bishop and martyr, venerated as a saint by the Catholic Church and the Orthodox Church.

According to tradition Marcian was the first bishop of Syracuse; a disciple of the apostle Peter. He is considered the first bishop of the West, as he arrived in Sicily while the apostle was still in Antioch. (Note: Martyred bishop of Syracuse, Italy, called "the First Bischop of the West". — Bunson, Our Sunday Visitor's Encyclopedia of Saints, 2003, p. 519. The same definition is given by scholars C. J. Stallman, The Past in Hagiographic Texts: S. Marcian of Syracuse, in G. W. Clarke, Reading the Past in Late Antiquity, Singapore 1990, pp. 347-365 and Hugo Buchthal, Art of the Mediterranean World: 100-1400 A. D., 1983, p. 61.)

Sources on Marcianus are considered late, as they are found only from the Byzantine era (7th century) onward. A Kontakion and an Encomium form the first two hagiographies on the saint, (Note: However, the presence of a Marcian of Syracuse in the oldest Western martyrology, dating back to the fourth century, cannot be ruled out: in the Martyrologium Hieronymianum, in fact, the commemoration of a martyr named Marciae appears several times, whom several historians have linked to the Antiochian protobishop. Cf. Campione (2005, p. 23).) but the laudatory nature of these literary works makes it difficult to distinguish truthful biographical elements from fantastic ones.

An alleged anachronism identified in the text of the author of the Encomium - which would date the martyrdom to a much later time than the apostolic era - and the absence of ancient written or figurative evidence has led many scholars to date Bishop Marcian to no earlier than the 3rd century.

The oldest image of Marcian is found in the catacombs of St. Lucy: it is a fresco dating from the 8th century. Another depiction of him was found inside the so-called crypt of St. Marcian: a Byzantine basilica built over an ancient early Christian complex that tradition has identified as the saint's dwelling and later as his tomb. However, his relics are not found in Syracuse; they are kept in the cities of Gaeta and Messina.

== Hagiographic sources ==
=== In literature ===
==== 7th and 8th centuries ====
The earliest record of Marcianus, a bishop and martyr with ties to Syracuse, dates back to the second half of the seventh century and is a Kontakion - composed of a poetic homily and a liturgical hymn, like the Akathist in use in the sixth century - attributed to the hymnographer Gregory, although the Jesuit Gaetani had mistakenly attributed it to the Sicilian Joseph the Hymnographer. In the Kontakion Marcianus is presented as:

the first star ... who from the East came to enlighten the peoples of the West.

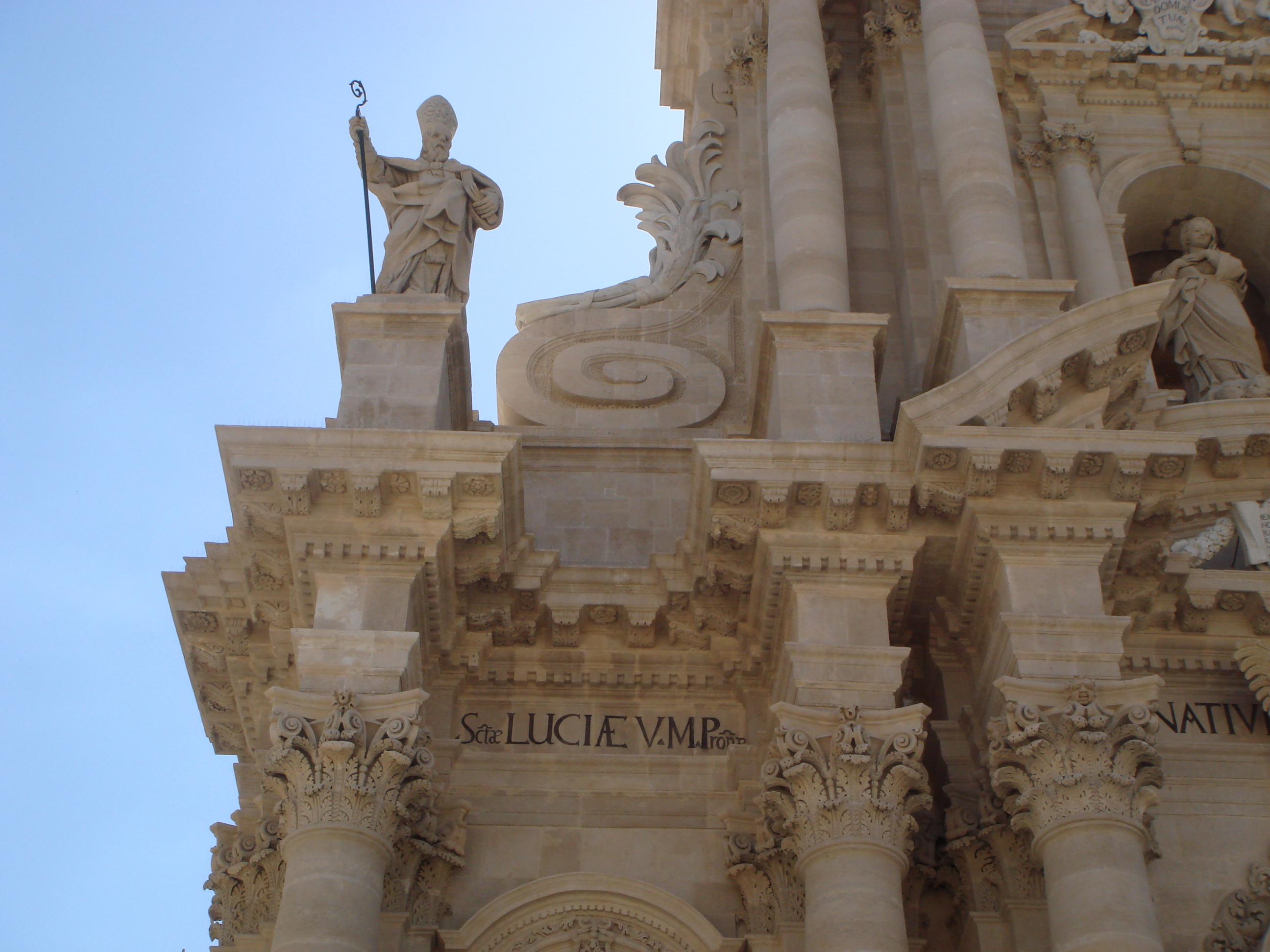
Statue of Marcianus, sculpted by Ignazio Marabitti in 1757, placed on the top of the Syracuse Cathedral

This is followed by an Encomium, datable to the late 7th century and early 8th century, written in Greek and preserved in the Vatican, entitled The Encomium of St. Marcianus, which takes up and expands on the information provided by the Kontakion. The Byzantine encomiast states that in writing his text he made use of the oral tradition and the writing of a certain Peregrino (or Pellegrino), from whom he learned passages about a Passio - which has not been preserved - that this Peregrino, a disciple of Marcianus, wrote about his mentor.

The precedence of the Kontakion over the Encomium, however, is not unanimously accepted, for example: the philologist and paleographer Mioni believes that the Kontakion is older and dates back to the early years of the introduction of the Greek rite in Syracuse (for Mioni in the 663-8th century). In contrast, the scholar Amore believes instead that it is the Encomium that is older, by virtue of its content and by making a comparison, in addition to the Kontakion, with the Life of St. Zosimus (a monk, initiator in 648 of the Greek episcopal series). While in the first two documents the Syracusan church appears to be of Petrine foundation, in the Life of St. Zosimus there is no mention of either the martyr or the origins, dating back to the apostolic age, of the said church. However, the dating of this Life, believed to be slightly earlier than the works in which the Marcian tradition or its contemporaries are narrated, remains controversial.

According to Magnano, the failure to mention the Petrine origins would not be proof of the invention of such a tradition, but rather, he argues, they may have been omitted because there was no need to mention them, as they were commonly accepted. Lanzoni, on the other hand, believes that this silence, which he also identified in the earlier extensive correspondence of letters between Pope Gregory the Great and the Syracusan bishop, is proof of the groundlessness of such a claimed ancient origin. For Amore, it was the Encomium that started the tradition of apostolic origins.

==== Uncertain dating ====
A separate discussion is the Martyrium sancti Libertini episcopi Agrigenti et s. Peregrini, a Latin text, due to its controversial date of origin. Some scholars date its author to the second half of the 5th century, while according to others he would not be earlier than the age of the Byzantine encomiast. (Note: For the late date see, for example, Biagio Pace, Arte e civiltà della Sicilia antica: Barbari i bizantini, 1949, who on p. 18 states: The legend of a Pellegrino, disciple of Marcian of Syracuse [...] is contained in a hagiographic document of uncertain but not ancient date. It is certainly not older than the Greek encomium of Marcianus, a work of the seventh, eighth centuries [...]) The text of this work was first published in the 17th century in Gaetani's Vitae Sanctorum Siculorum. (Note: Gaetani received it from his brother, Constantine, who in turn had found it in an Abbey in Farfa. The text has recently been edited by the hagiographer Scorza Barcellona. See for more details Rizzo (2003, pp. 399–427).) In the Martyrium in question, Marcian is recognised as bishop - Syracusanae ecclesiae Martianus episcopus - but there is no mention of him being a Petrine bishop.

Rizzo states that it is precisely the absence of the reference to his Petrine origins - according to the scholar, it is a legend born in the Byzantine era - that allows one to date the hagiographer to the fifth century. He also states that if the hagiographer is really to be dated to the Vandal age, the martyrs are to be considered of pre-Constantine age.

==== 8th and 9th centuries ====
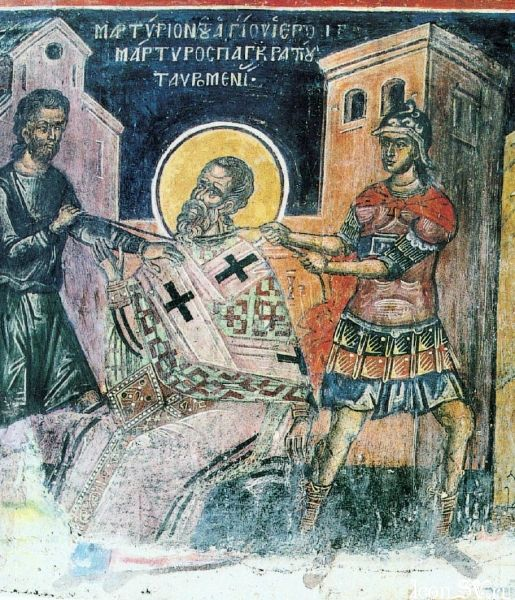
Saint Pancras (Mount Athos). The Taormina bishop is not present in the Encomium

Written in the 8th century, and already widespread in the 9th, the Vita Sancti Pancratii di Taormina contains biographies of Marcianus, Pancras of Taormina and Birillus of Catania. This Vita is defined by hagiographic critics as fable-like, full of fanciful elements. It is certainly posterior to the Encomium, in which Pancras does not yet appear, who would be compared to Marcian from this very Vita. (Note: See Siracusa e Taormina nell'agiografia italogreca, in Rivista di studi bizantini e neoellenici (1990, p. 43): Since there is no mention of Pancras of Taormina in the Encomium of Marcianus, it is likely that at this early stage the apostolic legend of Syracuse did not yet involve Taormina, although it cannot be ruled out that the latter's claims are deliberately ignored)

"An extensive Martyrdom of St. Pancras was spread under the name of Evagrius, and in the vortex of the legends contained therein St. Marcianus was also dragged in, as well as the author's saint of the same name"

— Rizzo, Sicilia cristiana dal I al V secolo, 2006, p. 13.

Lanzoni assumed that the Synaxarion of Constantinople drew its Sicilian source from this document.

However, the hagiographer Van Esbroeck argued that a legend of Pancras already existed originally, datable to the 6th-7th century, devoid of the fable elements included in the Vita written in later times. It would have been known to Theodore the Studite, who in his work on the Taormina martyr also ignores a parallel life of Marcianus and Pancras.

Such a legend would have originally contained only the Petrine mission, thus it would have been devoid of the territorial dispute between the bishop of Syracuse and the bishop of Taormina that instead characterises the Life of the pseudo-Evagrius. (Note: Several scholars claim that there is an overt desire in the Vita Pancratii to prove that the church in Taormina is older than the church in Syracuse. This claim has led to speculation that the work was written after the Islamic conquest of Syracuse (878) when Taormina remained the last center of power of the Byzantine empire in Sicily. See Rivista di studi bizantini e neoellenici (1990, p. 52). However, it could be a simple municipal rivalry carried ideologically in the confrontation between the two saints: The encounter between the two saints has also been interpreted as an occasion and exemplification of a kind of municipal rivalry. The conflict of competencies between the two bishops, played out on a claimed superiority of Pancras over Marcian... — Motta, Percorsi dell'agiografia: società e cultura nella Sicilia tardoantica e bizantina, 2004, p. 216.) The literary work of Marcianus and that of Pancras, however, represent the basis on which several other later legends were formed.

==== 10th century onwards ====
Of later date, and therefore most likely dependent on the earliest works, are other literary versions in which Marcian of Syracuse is mentioned.

Symeon the Metaphrast in his Commentary on Saints Peter and Paul, attributed to him (around the 10th century), confirms the constant unitary reference of the Sicilian bishops. Metaphrast in his text says that Marcian of Syracuse was ordained bishop by the Apostle Peter together with Pancras of Taormina and Birillus of Catania. The Byzantine hagiographer also claims that the apostle Peter, in addition to ordaining the aforementioned bishops, came himself to the island of Sicily.

In this regard, a calendar of Syracuse saints written on parchment in Gothic or Gallic characters, and therefore called Gallican Calendar, found in the Syracuse catacombs in the 17th century but dating back to 1152, arouses curiosity. It reports the visit of St Peter to the city, commemorating it on the 30th of June, specifying that at that time St Marcian was still alive. According to later accounts, the apostle would have visited many places in Sicily, but this is not confirmed by any ancient source. The Acts of the Apostles only report the apostle Paul's stay in Syracuse for three days, without saying what happened in that short span of time, in the year 61.

=== In the Eastern tradition ===
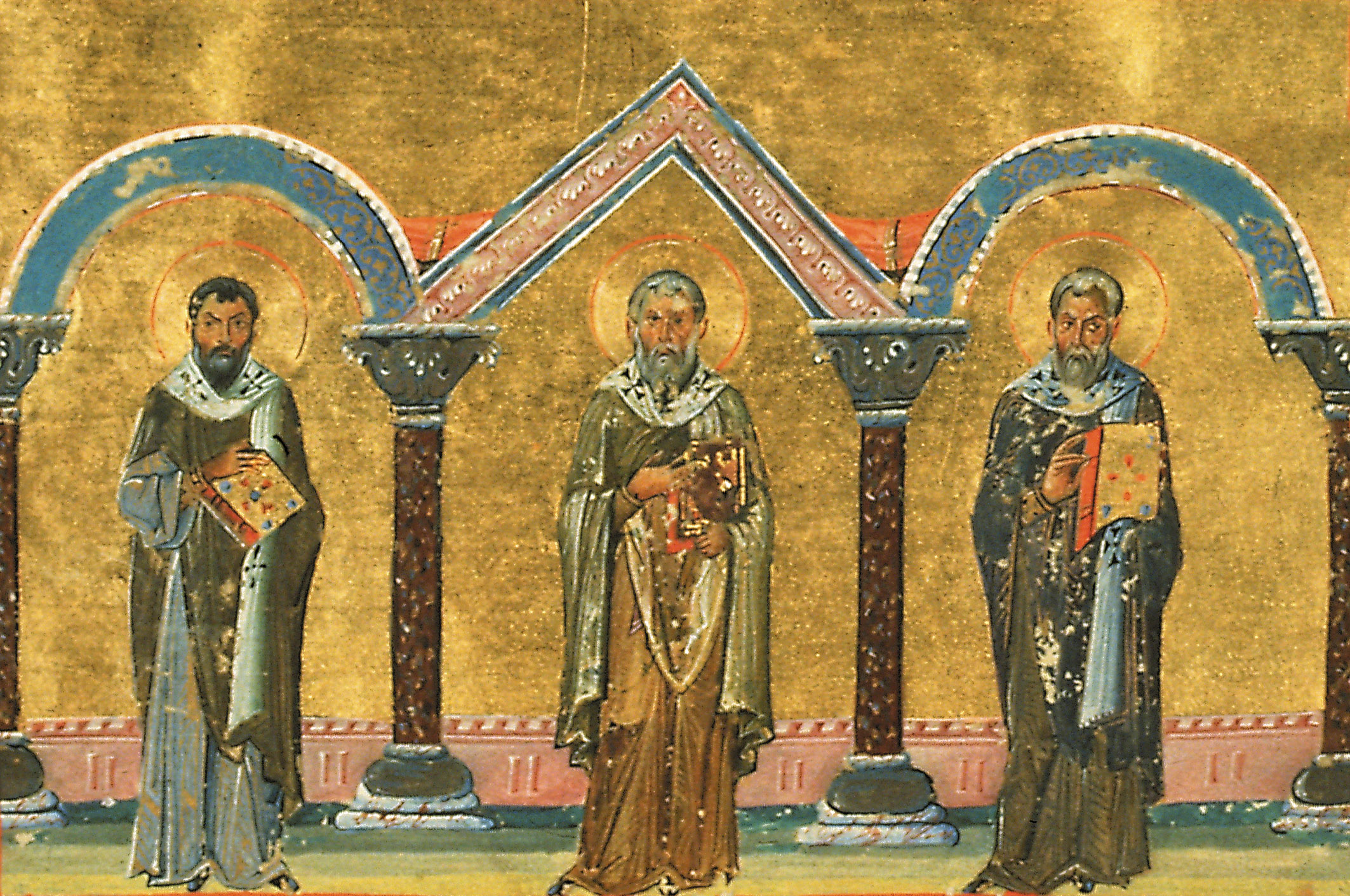
Sicilian saints in the Menology of Basil II: Marcianus (or Marcellus) of Syracuse; Pancras of Taormina and Philagrius of Cyprus

The name of Marcianus, martyr of Syracuse, appears in the Eastern liturgical books under the dates 30 or 31 October and 9 February. As a dependant of the Eastern liturgy, the 9th-century Marcian calendar of Naples records him on 30 October. He also appears in the Capuan Codex of 991, the Menei of Grottaferrata and the Typikon of Saint Bartholomew.

Marcian is also present in the Menology of the Byzantine emperor Basil II, composed by Symeon the Metaphrast, around the tenth century, at the date of 9 February with the bishops Philagrius of Cyprus and Pancras of Taormina. (Note: From the Menology of Basil II, excerpted from the book of Giovanni di Giovanni, Storia ecclesiastica di Taormina, ed. 1870, pp. 39-40: Commemoration of St. Marcianus Bishop of Sicily, Philagrius Bishop of Cyprus, and Pancras Bishop of Taormina. These were disciples of St. Peter the Apostle.) The attestation of the name Marcellus, or Mark, referring to Marcian, and its placement at 9 February, came with the Synaxarium of Constantinople.

"Marcianus, in this collective memory of the 9th of February - which passes into second place -, is duplicated in Mark and Marcellus [...]"

— Salvatore Pricoco, Sicilia e Italia suburbicaria tra IV e VIII secolo, 1991, p. 146.

In the major document for the Orthodox Church, also written around the 10th century, Marcian appears there with two different dates and two different names: at 9 February there is the celebration of Marcellus of Syracuse, consecrated bishop by the apostle Peter, remembered along with Pancras of Taormina; (Note: For further discussion on Synax. and the July 9 date referring to Pancras or also to Marcianus, see: Lanzoni (1927, p. 618); Rizzo (2006, p. 87); Pricoco (1991, p. 146). Pricoco specifically states that: The only variants documented in the Synaxarion are the joint consecration of Marcianus and Pancras by Peter and Paul - limited to the July 9 news dedicated only to the bishop of Taormina - [...]) he then appears alone at the date of 31 October.

=== In the Western martyrologies ===
Scholars disagree on whether Marcianus is mentioned in the oldest western martyrology, namely the Martyrologium Hieronymianum, whose Latin text dates back to the 4th century. Here a pair of martyrs, Rufini et Marciae, attributed to the city of Syracuse appears under the date 21 June. However, it is not certain whether that Marciae can correspond to the bishop and martyr Marcian of Syracuse. (Note: Massara & Francesca Paola (2012, p. 276): However, the proposed reconstruction of the name Marcianus in the Martirologium Hyeronimianum (4th century), which would thus be the earliest mention of the saint together with the Passio of the martyr Pellegrino [...], is probably to be accepted.)

The pair Rufini et Marciae, also placed in the civitate of Syracuse, appears in four other historical martyrologies at 21 June: in that of Florus, Ado, Usuard and Notker.

Apud Siciliam civitate Syracusis, natale sanctorum Rufini et Marciae
In Sicily in the city of Syracuse, birthplace of the saints Rufini et Marciae

— From the martyrology of Florus.

However, the official appearance in Western sources only occurs in the 16th century when Marcianus' name is written in the Martyrologium Romanum; a work by Caesar Baronius, approved by Pope Gregory XIII, where the saint is initially commemorated on 14 June.

Syracusis sancti Marciani episcopi, qui a beato Petro ordinatus episcopus, post evangelii praedicationem a Iudaeis occisus est.
In Syracuse, St Marcian, whom St Peter consecrated bishop, was killed by the Jews after preaching the Gospel.

— Roman Martyrology, ed. 1750, Vatican, p. 122.

The detail on the killing by the Jews was taken from the Synaxarion of Constantinople. The last update of the Roman Martyrology was made in 2001; Marcian is listed there on 30 October with the following entry:

"In Syracuse, Saint Marcianus, believed to be the first bishop of this city."

— Roman Martyrology: reformed in accordance with the decrees of the Second Vatican Ecumenical Council and promulgated by Pope John Paul II.

== In the Martyrologium Hieronymianum ==
Syracuse appears several times in the Martyrologium Hieronymianum, on 21 June it appears in three different codices, the most important in it; these are the codices Epternacensis (= E) from England; Bernensis from Metz; (= B), Wissemburgensis (= W) from Normandy:

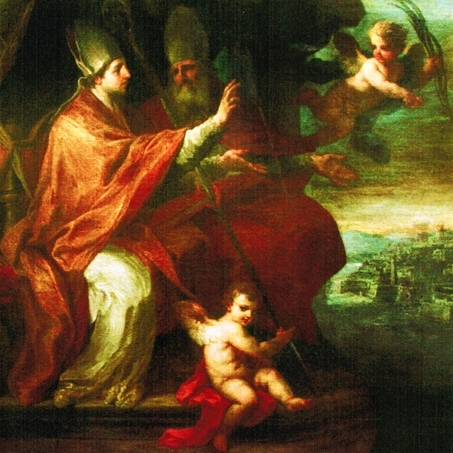
Saint Marcian depicted together with Saint Erasmus, as co-patron saint of Gaeta (work by Sebastiano Conca)

- codex E: ...Sicil(ia) civi(tate) Siracussa Rufini et Marciae...
- codex B: ...In Sicilia civit(ate) Siracusa Rufini et Marcie...
- codex W: ...In Sicilia civit(ate) Rufini et Marcie...

Lanzoni and Delehaye, however, denied the reliability of such records - they, of all the Sicilian names cited by the Martyrologium, accept as historically grounded only four: Agatha, Euplius, Lucy and Pancras. (Note: See Campione (2005, p. 17), who believes that the debunking done by the two scholars is perhaps excessive, while recognizing value in the criteria of scientific rigor they used.) Delehaye, while excluding the Rufinus/Marcianus pair asserting that: "de Rufino Syracusano silent monumenta" - so it would rather correspond to the bishop Rufinus of Capua (Note: It should be pointed out, however, that in the martyrologies of Florus, Ado, Usuard, and Notker a clear distinction is made between the Rufinus of Syracuse, placed on June 21, and that of Capua placed on August 27. See Campione (2005, p. 21).) - recognises however that Marciae is the truncated name of Marcianus; the first Syracusan bishop. His reconstruction has, however, been the subject of debate.

Otherwise, Lanzoni totally rejects any juxtaposition with the Sicilian city, asserting that: "perhaps the codices of the Martyrologium contain transcription errors, mispronunciations of names or similar mistakes", since, continues the Faenza scholar, there is no memory of these two martyrs in the ancient Syracusan traditions, he therefore juxtaposes Rufinus with Alexandria, where he is celebrated on 22 June, and Marcia - whom he prefers in the female variant - in Africa, in the laterculus of 8 June. For Delehaye, however, the forms Marciani, Marci, Marcianae, Marciae, juxtaposed with Egypt or Moesia, are all traceable to the name Marcianus.

The same pair, Rufini et Marciae, is also described and attributed to Syracuse on 21 June by four other historical Martyrologists: Florus, Ado, Usuard and Notker.

Nevertheless, even the scholar Amore (author of a study on the Encomium of Saint Marcianus) does not accept the possible identification of Marcianus with the Marciae that the Martyrologium first places in Syracuse. Amore asserts that Marcianus was never mentioned by western martyrologies, until the late Roman Martyrology (XVI), where he appears on 14 June.

Campione instead gives credence to the original attestation of the Martyrologium, assuming a progressive loss of the cult of the two martyrs in the Syracusan milieu. The insertion of Marcianus on 31 October in the Synaxarium of Constantinople, which took place in the 10th century, i.e. at a time when the churches of southern Italy and the island of Sicily depended on the Church of Constantinople, would have favoured the spread of the date attested in eastern circles, obscuring the original 21 June.

"Further lines of research could investigate the reasons why, starting from a certain period, a mechanism of 'transfer' of cultic tradition occurred for Marcianus, obscuring, to the point of completely dissolving it, the tradition of the Martyrologium and historical Martyrologies with reference to the date of 21 June: there is no longer any trace of it even in the Roman Martyrology, which commemorates the first bishop of Syracuse on 14 June."

Campione also reveals the diffusion of the anthroponym Marcianus in the Calabrian-Sicilian area, especially in the Syracusan area, (Note: He cites the examples of Gregory the Great's correspondent Marcianus for Sicily; the tabularius of the Syracuse church; a monk from the monastery of San Vito on Mount Etna; and several others. See Campione (2005, pp. 25–26).) thus contradicting Amore's hypothesis that sees the origin and diffusion of this anthroponym only in the Eastern tradition.

== In the Encomium ==
=== Introduction ===
The Encomium is dated no earlier than the end of the 7th century because its anonymous author mentions the Syracusan bishop Theodosius II in the text, and remembers him as having been dead for some time. Bishop Theodosius, who was present at the Third Council of Constantinople in 680, being the protagonist of the work in question together with Marcian, was, according to a recent supposition, the promoter of the "rediscovery" of the cult of the bishop Marcian. It was Theodosius, in the account of the encomiast, who consecrated an altar in the cave of Pelopie before all the citizens: that was the home of Marcian.

The encomiast also connects the bishop of the Constantinopolitan Council with the apostolic-age martyr by stating that he, serving the Syracusan Church, wished to follow in the footsteps of his two predecessors: Marcianus and Zosimus. However, in the Life of Saint Zosimus, roughly contemporary with the period of the writing of the Encomium, Marcianus is never mentioned.

=== Hagiography of Marcianus ===
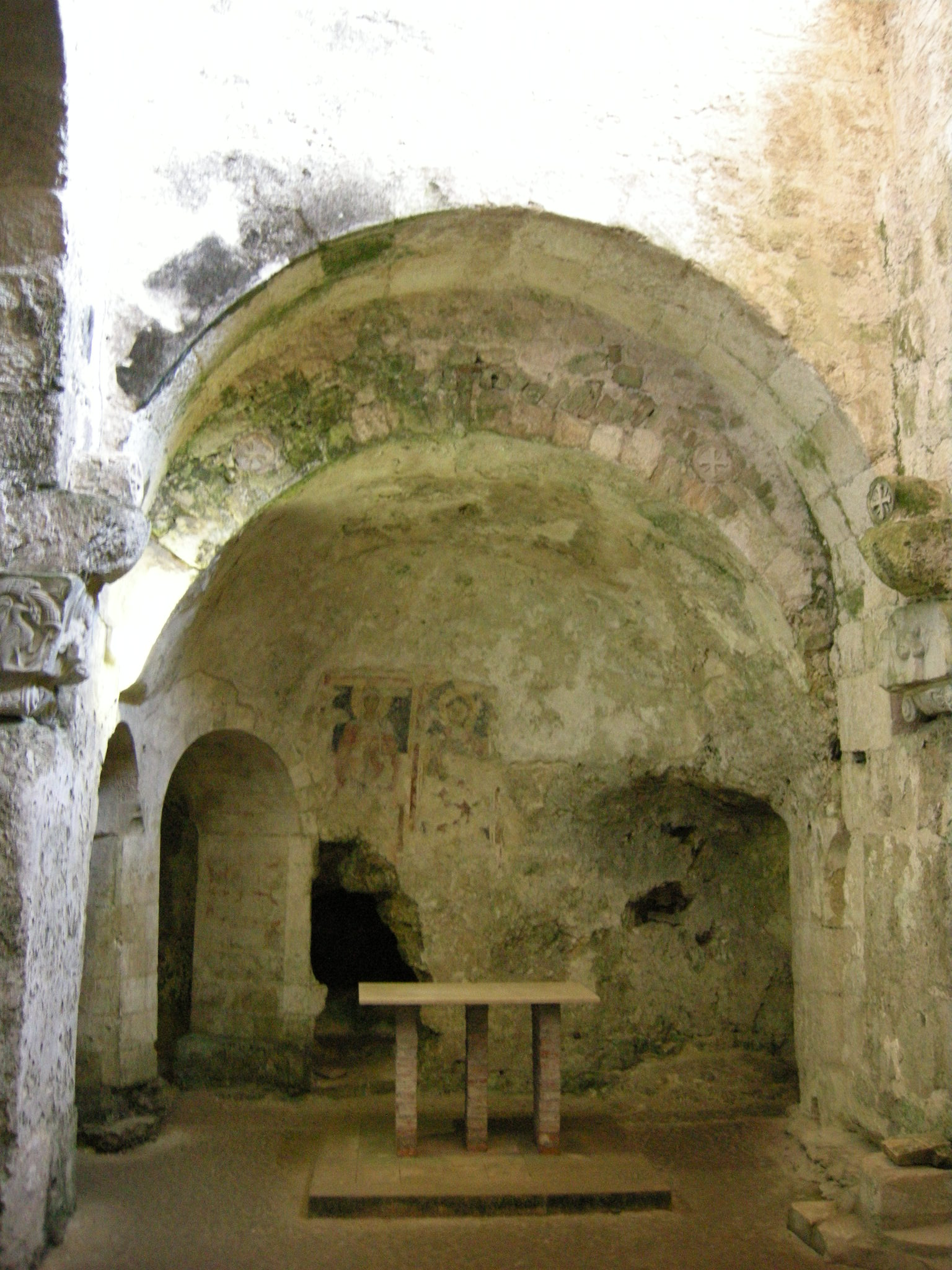
The altar mentioned in the Encomium, identified as the one inside the crypt of Saint Marcian, dedicated to the bishop

The Encomium presents Marcian as a disciple of the apostle Peter. The encomiast narrates that the Antiochian was sent to Syracuse by the apostle Peter when the latter was still in Antioch; thus before his arrival in Rome.

In the city, Marcian dwelt in a part of the caves called Pelopie.

"And finally this holy man, shining like the sun in the night, penetrated into some caves, located in the upper part of the city, called Pelopie in which his venerated sepulchre is now preserved."

— (Encomium of St. Marcianus in Acta Sanctorum Junii, Paris, 1867, translated from the Greek by A. Amore, St. Marcianus of Syracuse, Vatican City, 1958).

The geographical territory of Syracuse is notoriously full of deep caves, both natural and artificial, that have been used by humans since the earliest times. These Pelopian caves, states the encomiast, were located in front of the synagogue of the Jews - this information is considered useful to geographically locate the places where the first Jewish community of Syracuse actually resided; present in the territory since Roman times. According to scholars, the Encomium describes the moment of the community's transfer from the district located in the Akradina to the one located on the island of Ortygia. (Note: The encomiast's indications were confirmed by archaeological excavations conducted in the 1900s, which unearthed in the Akradina, typical elements of Jewish symbology dating precisely to the 3rd or 4th century. See Gebbia (1979, pp. 247–248); Cf. C. Colafemmina, Ipogei ebraici. Cit. in Scandaliato & Mulè (2002, p. 15).)

In his path of evangelisation, Marcianus succeeded in baptising many people, thus converting them to the Christian faith.

According to the scholar Cataudella, the first part of the Encomium contains all the descriptive elements of the early Christian age:

"the moment in which Christian preaching achieves great success and expands among the people, the pagans of Syracuse [...] Baptism, miracles, the Trinity, victory over idolatry, the sacrifice of the cross and redemption etc."

— Quintino Cataudella, La cultura bizantina in Sicilia, in Storia della Sicilia, IV, 3-56, Napoli, 1979-80.

The encomiast says that Marcianus was martyred by the Syracusan Jews, whose large community had felt threatened by the bishop's powers of persuasion.

In paragraph 6, the encomiast narrates the martyrdom suffered by Marcian's disciple, Peregrinus, accompanied by Libertinus; episcop of Agrigento. Immediately afterwards, in paragraph 7, the encomiast continues and closes his narrative, placing the martyrdom scenario in a third-century context, destined to make scholars debate for a long time.

He mentions the time of the Roman emperors Valerian and Gallienus, 254–259, saying that it is Peregrinus who recalls those persecutions of Christians:

Per idem tempus, inquit, Valeriano et Gallieno tyrannidem exercentibus missa sunt in universum orbem, ad evertendam funditusque tollendam Christianorum religionem, mandata
At that time, he [Peregrinus] says, Valerian and Gallienus were tyrants, and orders were sent throughout the world to oppose the Christian religion and put an end to it.

— Jean Bolland, Acta sanctorum, Die decima quarta junii, ed. 1887, p. 608.

=== Anachronism hypothesis ===
This scenario, ranging from the 1st century to the 3rd century, has prompted many different questions and explanations among scholars.

==== Peregrinus' syngramma ====
Since the main source of the encomiast - in addition to the aforementioned oral tradition - is Peregrinus' syngramma, the words of Marcianus' alleged disciple and alleged contemporary are of extreme relevance.

Several scholars, including Rizzo, provide an explanation that would eliminate the alleged anachronism, placing Marcian in the 1st century and Peregrinus in the 3rd. (Note: See also the explanation of scholar Msgr. De Gregorio who states that Peregrinus cannot be a contemporary of Marcian, and therefore the phrase "Marciani doctrina imbutus" must be understood as a moral teaching, an ideal disciple. Cit. "San Libertino di Agrigento Vescovo e martire".)

Rizzo explains that the author of the Encomium would have had no reason to transfer the martyr Peregrinus and the bishop Libertinus of Agrigento (who are mentioned jointly in chapter 6, prior to chapter 7 where Valerian and Gallienus are mentioned) to the 1st century, along with Marcianus.

In this regard, the significant note on the lack of mention of a Petrine mission for the martyrs Peregrinus and Libertinus should indeed be pointed out (in the Encomium there is never any mention of their Petrine ordination, it would only be found in much later accounts), (Note: The scholar also reveals this absence in the hagiographic document that he dates to the mid-5th century (Rizzo (2003, p. 403)), comparing his survey with the same one that Scorza Barcelona already made: Scorza Barcellona keeps to the same order of considerations when he notes that the work also lacks a trace of the claim to Petrine origin that the Agrigento Church would have advocated for itself at a certain time.) a situation that would therefore allow the two martyrs to be confidently dated to the 3rd century, without any anachronism. This is what the anonymous author of the Passio of Peregrinus and Libertinus does, who dates the two martyrs, together with Marcianus, to the time of Valerian and Gallienus, without mentioning a Petrine mission for any of the three. (Note: This, however, would be, according to Rizzo, an error, since the hagiographer, making use of Paregrinus' syngramma (later to be used by the encomiast), reveals a date, that of Valerian and Gallienus, which instead represented only a historical context narrated by the martyr, who died posthumously to that persecution. See Rizzo (2003, p. 418).)

Rizzo then continues, affirming the possibility that the encomiast, speaking of Valerian and Gallienus, only wished to propose an evocative setting for the final phase of his narration. This setting would therefore recount the persecution carried out by the two emperors - in which the martyrs who are the protagonists of the tale did not die - the same as that suffered by Marcianus two centuries earlier. Peregrinus would thus have been a disciple of Marcian, but not a contemporary of his.

"Not contemporaneity, but spiritual affinity implied the connection declared by the encomiast in paragraph 6; to be captivated by a teaching was possible even at a distance of time."

— Rizzo, Un raro syngramma nella tradizione scritta sui santi Peregrino e Libertino, p. 418.

Rizzo then remarks on the chronology of the Marcian tradition:

"Quite rough would have been the first on the part of an author who had clearly recorded two dates so distant from each other; neither could the same author have backdated to the apostolic age Peregrinus as well, attributing to him at the same time the authorship of a work on the persecution of Valerian and Gallienus, nor vice versa taking away from his Marcian that glory."

— Rizzo, Un raro syngramma nella tradizione scritta sui santi Peregrino e Libertino, p. 418.

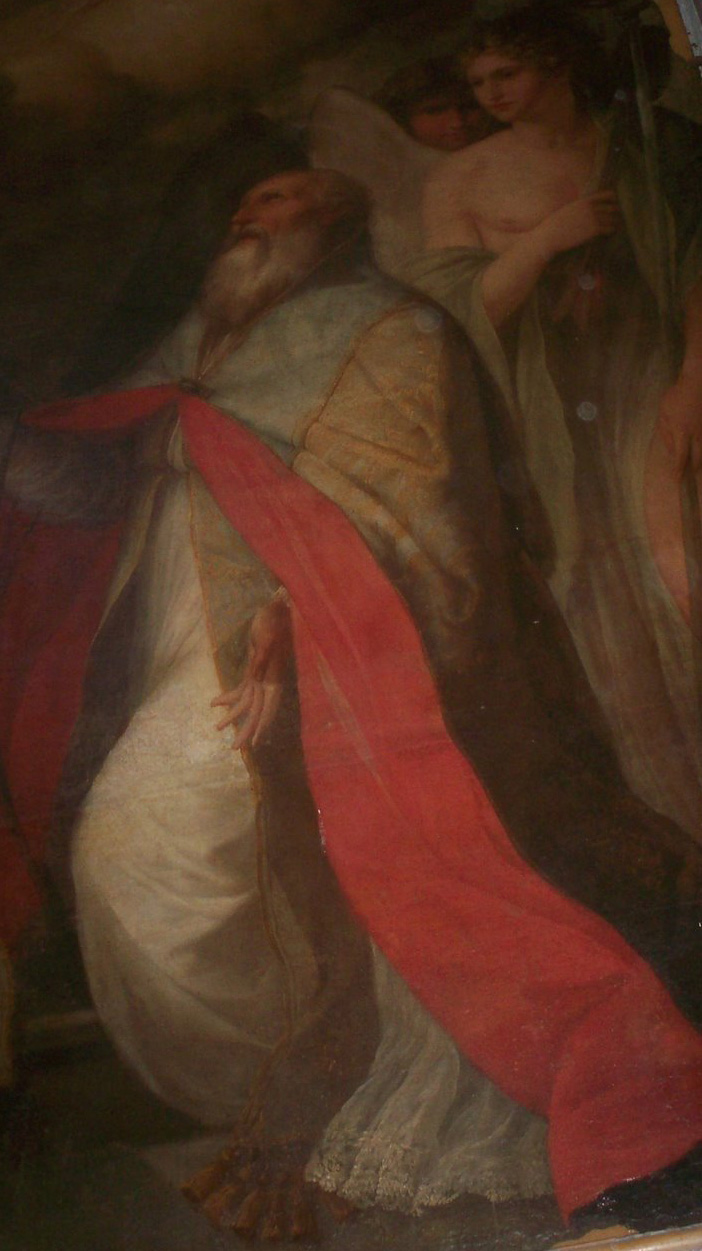
Marciano in an 18th-century painting, placed in the Church of the Holy Trinity and St. Marcianus in Lentini

Another scholar who had already ruled out the alleged anachronism some time earlier was Lancia di Brolo, who in his work came to the same conclusions as Rizzo, namely: Peregrinus could not have suffered martyrdom in the time of Valerian and Gallienus and at the same time narrate it, and therefore deduces that he died some time later; Peregrinus had been a disciple of Marcianus, absorbing his teachings, but was not his contemporary, since he only had the same ideals of the Petrine mission as Marcianus; moreover, the author of the Encomium, a Syracusan for sure, could not have been so culturally ignorant as not to know that the emperors he named lived a good two centuries after the end of the apostolic age. Lancia di Brolo states:

"So decadent were the studies and so ignorant were the people of Syracuse in the 7th century, which only a few years before had been an imperial residence, that he did not know how Valerian and Gallienus ruled? So uncouth were this orator and his audience that they believed that Saint Marcian was a disciple of Peter in the first century and a martyr in the third?"

— D. G. Lancia di Brolo, Storia della Chiesa in Sicilia nei dieci primi secoli del cristianesimo, 1880, p. 44.

For Lancia di Brolo, the document as a whole contains 'an original nucleus that cannot be critically rejected and, as such, has testimonial value'.

Of an opposite view was Lanzoni, a contemporary of Lancia di Brolo, who in his critical work asserts that he does not understand why his colleague claims that Peregrinus' syngramma does not date the martyrdom of Marcianus to the epoch of the aforementioned emperors. In fact, Lanzoni in the time span cited by the encomiast establishes the martyrdom of Marcianus in an adamant manner. He even doubts that Peregrinus ever existed, asserting that he might be an imaginary character, invented by the author of the Encomium.

Lanzoni's view consists in recognising an insurmountable anachronism within the text, which invalidates the entire document. The Faenza scholar described it in these terms:

"In short, the author does not seem to have realised that he has given St. Marcian more than two centuries of life! [...] Yet the author of the Encomium with a monstrous anachronism narrated that Marcian was a contemporary of St. Peter".

— Lanzoni, Le diocesi d'Italia dalle origini al principio del secolo VII,1927, pp. 620 e 640.

In addition to Lanzoni, the two Bollandists Daniel Papebroch and William van Hooff also supported a 3rd-century dating for Bishop Marcianus.

==== Incorrect names ====
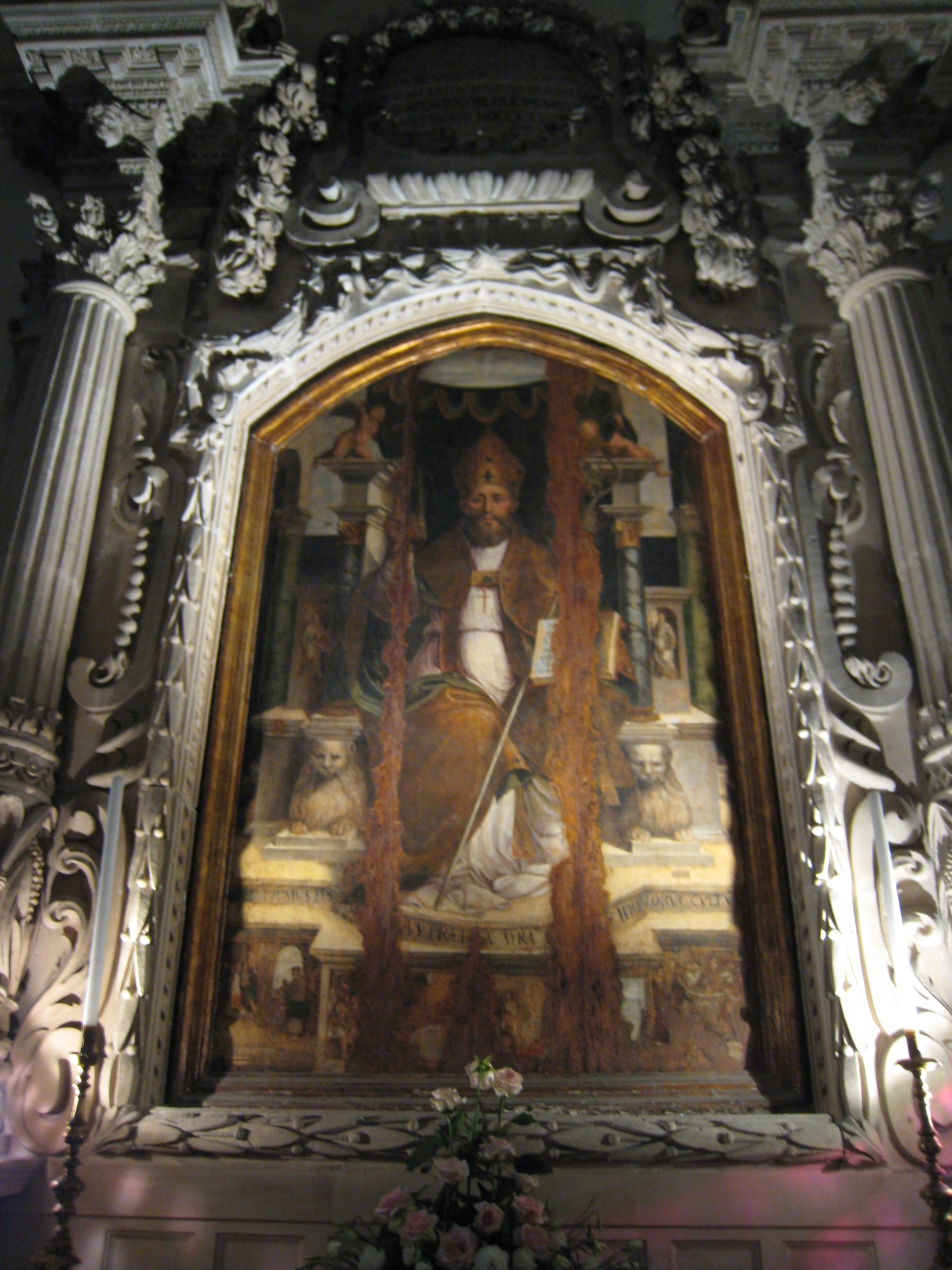
Antonellian school panel depicting Saint Marcian, placed above the altar dedicated to the saint, inside the Syracuse cathedral

There have also been scholars, however, who, in order to remedy the anachronism, have considered the plausible explanation to lie in the fact that the encomiast cited the wrong emperors. Thus, for example, Gaetani, who in the 17th century, in his biography on Marcianus, thought he had to change the names of Valerian and Gallienus to Domitian or Nero, Roman emperors from the apostolic age.

"Thus Gaetani expunged the names of the emperors, noting in the margin of the text that they had been introduced there by mistake, and set the whole affair in the age of Domitian, while conceding that it could also anticipate the age of Nero."

— S. Pricoco, Sicilia e Italia suburbicaria tra IV e VIII secolo, 1991, p. 230.

He was echoed by Giovanni di Giovanni who in his Storia ecclesiastica di Sicilia found it reasonable to leave intact only the date of his birth, i.e. the 1st century, while changing the context of his martyrdom.

==== Two bishops named Marcianus ====
Other scholars, such as D'Angelo and Cesare Gaetani, considered that the encomiast may have put together two biographies: one belonging to a bishop of the apostolic age, the first-century Marcianus, and the other belonging to a bishop who lived under the empire of Valerian and Gallienus, the third-century Marcianus.

The scholar Amore is also of this opinion, but he dates the encomiast's Marcianus to the 5th century and not the 3rd. According to Amore, the Peregrinus and the Marcian of the Martyrdom - the same figures later taken up by the encomiast - died in the Vandal age. The scholar assumes, however, that the first bishop of Syracuse predated the 3rd century and was also called Marcian. Hence the confusion that led to the above-mentioned anachronism in the cited text of the Encomium.

This is not the opinion of Lanzoni, who totally excluded the possibility of a bishop datable to a century earlier than the 3rd, and dates the Encomium's Marcianus to the time of the empire of Valerian and Gallienus, taking the presumed apostolic dating as false. At most, the scholar agrees, the figure of Marcian is identifiable as that of the anonymous recipient, a bishop, of the letter written by the Roman clergy, which arrived in Sicily in 250–251, concerning the problem of the Lapsi.

== Life of Marcian in other versions ==
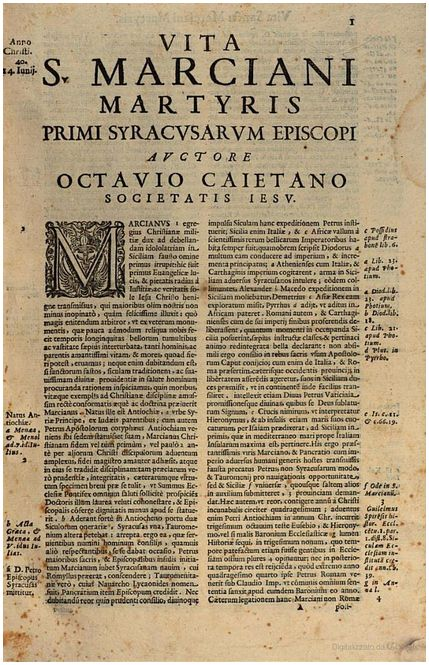
Life of St. Marcian written by Gaetani

After the writing of the Encomium, other works describing the life of the martyr are dated. Many new elements appear in these later works.

Precise dates are established: the year 39 or 40 for the departure, and 68 for the year of martyrdom.

In the biography published posthumously by Gaetani, it is also stated that Marcian had parents of Jewish origin who lived in Antioch.

=== The landing ===
The anecdote that Marcian sailed for Sicily in a ship from Syracuse, captained by a certain Romillus, is particularly noteworthy for the addition of details and particulars; together with it, a ship from Taormina, captained by a certain Licaonide, also landed at Antioch. The two captains, having heard the Gospel preached by the Apostle Peter and having converted to the new religion, were eager to bring new masters of this faith to their homeland, and the Prince of the Apostles gave them the two bishops: Romillus, from Syracuse, took Marcianus with him, while Licaonide, from Taormina, took Pancras on board.

During the sea voyage, Marcian and Pancras managed to convert the crews of the two ships. Marcian's ship is said to have landed in Syracuse two days before Pancras's.

Other versions say that this expedition was actually promoted by the Apostle Paul to evangelise the West, or that it was Peter who, having learnt of the large number of Jews in Sicily, sent the two bishops together to convert the Jewish people and preach the Gospel to them.

The historian Di Blasi, who recounts this legend in his text, stresses the importance of the silence of the oldest sources on such an undertaking, which in theory would have been the first evangelising mission carried out with great success for the West. A silence that essentially confirms the falsity or invention of such writings. Beyond the fanciful elements, Pricoco interprets it as a real reference to the importance of the maritime landing place represented by Sicily, noting that all the first evangelisers arrived there from the sea. Very few of them were autochthonous. The same idea is expressed by Lanzoni, who hypothesises that the first evangelisers came to Syracuse because of its "cosmopolitan port", which favoured the landing of Easterners and Israelites.

=== Martyrdom ===
A very detailed martyrdom of Marcianus is described in the Vita Pancratii. The passage, later taken up in broad outline by a late Latin Passio dedicated to the saint and substantially approved by Byzantine menologies, narrated that the protobishop Marcianus, persecuted by pagans - led by Seleucus and Gordius, the city's leaders -, by Jews, by the Montanists and the Medes, was pushed onto a boat while fire was thrown at him with siphons from a tower in the city's Grand Harbour (Note: The Porto Grande tower really existed. Gaetani, and before him the hagiographer who wrote about Marcianus, said it was still there in his time (Vitae Sanctorum Siculorum). See also Karl Krumbacher, Byzantinische Zeitschrift, 1993, p. 233.) - a clear reference to the well-known Greek fire (Note: This very reference would, according to scholars, be a clear indication of the historical reality in which the hagiographer who authored the text lived. The Greek fire developed around the 7th century, while in this case it is brought into a 1st-century context. Cf. Rivista di studi bizantini e neoellenici (1990, p. 37); Karl Krumbacher, Byzantinische Zeitschrift, 1993, p. 233.) - but a flood prevented the protobishop from burning. Marcian then found shelter on an island in Plemmirio. (Note: Local tradition has in the past linked the name of Marcianus to an island in Plemmirio: the island of St. Marcianus. Tommaso Fazello says that this small island was the same one where centuries earlier the Athenians placed their trophy after defeating the Syracusans in a naval battle (Athenian Expedition to Sicily). Fazello, Della storia di Sicilia, ed. 1817, p. 141. On the other hand, other Syracusan historians say that it is not known for sure which island it was, since there were two in front of the Plemmirio. See Giacomo Buonanni and Colonna, Delle antiche Siracuse, 1717, p. 124. For the trophy of the Athenians see Silvano Vinceti, Area marina protetta del Plemmirio, 2006, p. 50.) He finally died, after much torment, strangled by his opponents.

== Historical context of the hagiographic sources ==
=== The Jewish theme ===
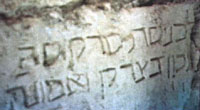
Jewish inscription found in the church of San Giovannello (Ortigia): "To the synagogue of Syracuse founded with justice and faith". — כתובת בבית הכנסת הגדול של סירקוזה

The text of the Encomium contains the anti-Jewish theme that characterises the entire posthumous hagiography of Marcianus. Some scholars have noted that the Marcian tradition makes the first historical mention of the Jews of Syracuse somewhat negative: they are presented as those who killed the first bishop of that city.

According to scholars, this delineation is due to the fact that the earliest established historical source on Marcian, the Byzantine era encomiast, lived in a context marked by opposition between Christians and Jews, restrictions on heterodoxy and forced conversions.

This would have begun in the mid-7th century when Bishop Zosimus (quoted by the encomiast) forbade the Jews from buying land where they wanted to build their synagogue. They were finally able to obtain the concession only through the intervention of a Byzantine princeps.

The encomiast would have used a third-century historical context to correlate his account (as evidenced by the mention of the emperors Valerian and Gallienus), a period corresponding to the time when Jewish testimony in Syracuse became more substantial.

The source that mentions the location of this first Jewish synagogue is considered reliable because it is a geographical memory. Moreover, archaeology has confirmed the Jewish presence in Akradina, the place mentioned by the encomiast.

Some scholars, such as the archaeologist Cavallari, have argued that the Akradina was the ideal place for the synagogue to have been built, since by the time the Jews arrived in Syracuse the city had already shrunk considerably and the aforementioned district represented its periphery: the ideal place where the city authorities could marginalise Jews and Christians, who were considered to be one people, distant from the polytheists.

As for the possibility of such an early Jewish settlement in Syracuse, some scholars argue that the Pelopian caves mentioned by the encomiast probably housed other Jewish nuclei from the time of the Jewish diaspora before Marcianus. Lancia di Brolo quotes the ancient Roman historian Flavius Josephus, who lived in the first century, who states that after the First Jewish War (66–70) 100,000 Jews were enslaved and sold to Roman patricians in Sicily. (Note: He then goes on to say that, having become free and wealthy settlers, they had indeed been able to create some martyrs through their controversy with the Christian religion. See D. G. Lancia di Brolo, Storia della Chiesa di Sicilia nei primi dieci secoli del Cristianesimo, Palermo 1880. Vol. 1, p. 47, cited in Scandaliato & Mulè (2002, p. 14), n. 4.) To this must be added Syracuse's centuries-old and constant openness to the territories of Africa, Asia Minor and Greece.

=== The connection with Constantinople ===
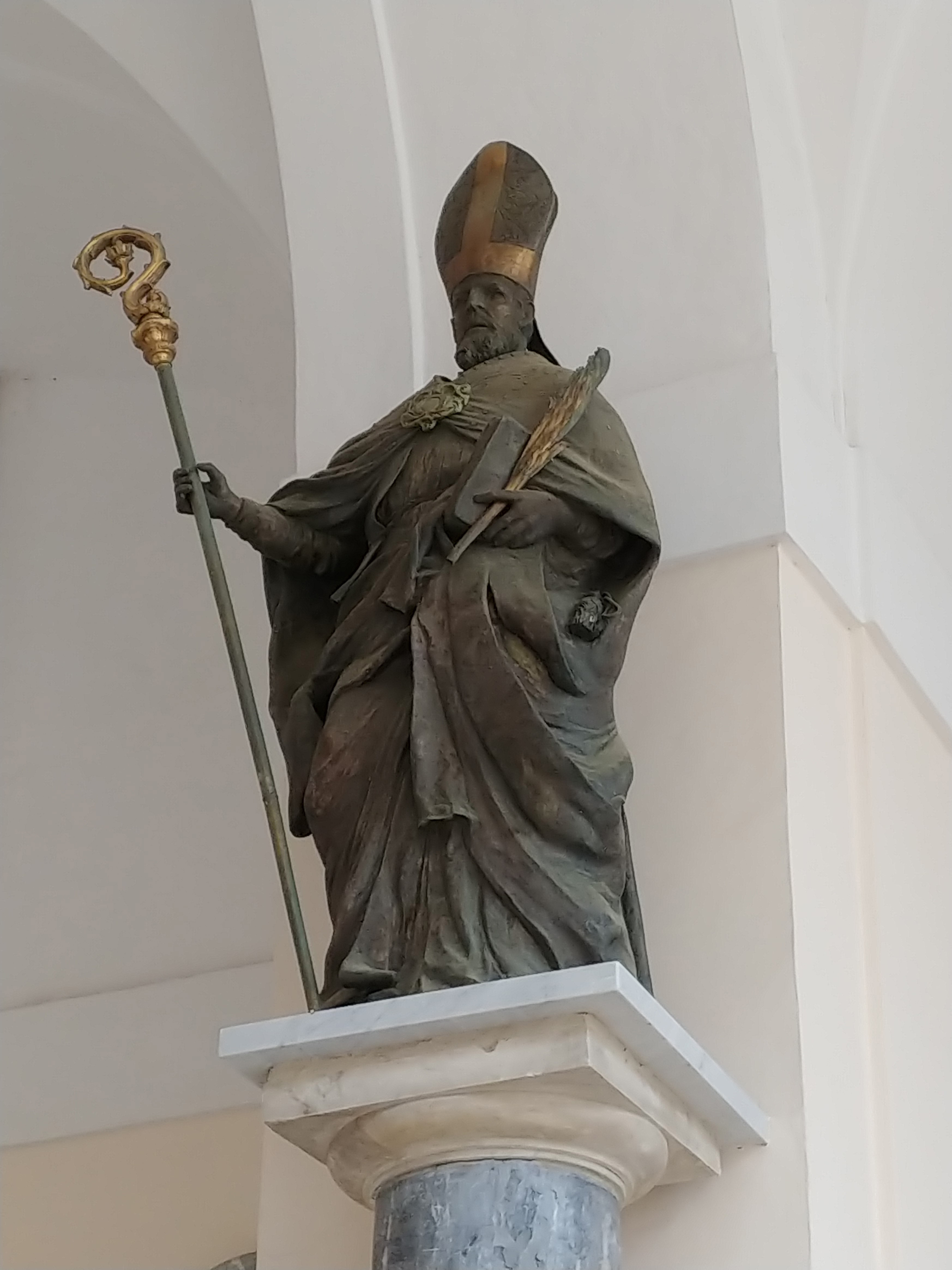
Statue of St. Marcianus in the atrium of Gaeta Cathedral, by Erasmo Vaudo (1974–75)

Other scholars have speculated that the Marcian tradition was a consequence of historical events in the Byzantine era.

Syracuse, which in 663 had become the imperial seat of Constans II, thus the capital of the entire Byzantine Empire (a situation that lasted six years and culminated in the emperor's assassination), at some point in the mid-eighth century was removed from the authority of the Latin Church and placed under that of the Greek Church. Thus a Marcian of Antiochian, Eastern origin would have served to link through common origin the Syracusan church with that of Constantinople, of which it had become a subject.

Also of important historical significance could be the discovery of the episcopal seal of an archbishop named Marcian who lived in the eighth century. (Note: The 8th-century Marcian is openly referred to by the title of archbishop. See Motta (2004, p. 216); Rivista di studi bizantini e neoellenici (1990, p. 47); Rivista di storia della chiesa in Italia (1982, p. 69).) This Marcian, much later than the one most often mentioned in the sources, has been identified as the first autocephalous archbishop of Syracuse, and could therefore have represented the rebirth of a new Syracuse once placed under the authority of the patriarchate of Constantinople, without overlooking, through the name Marcianus, the beginnings of the Sicilian church that came from Antioch.

== Archaeological evidence ==
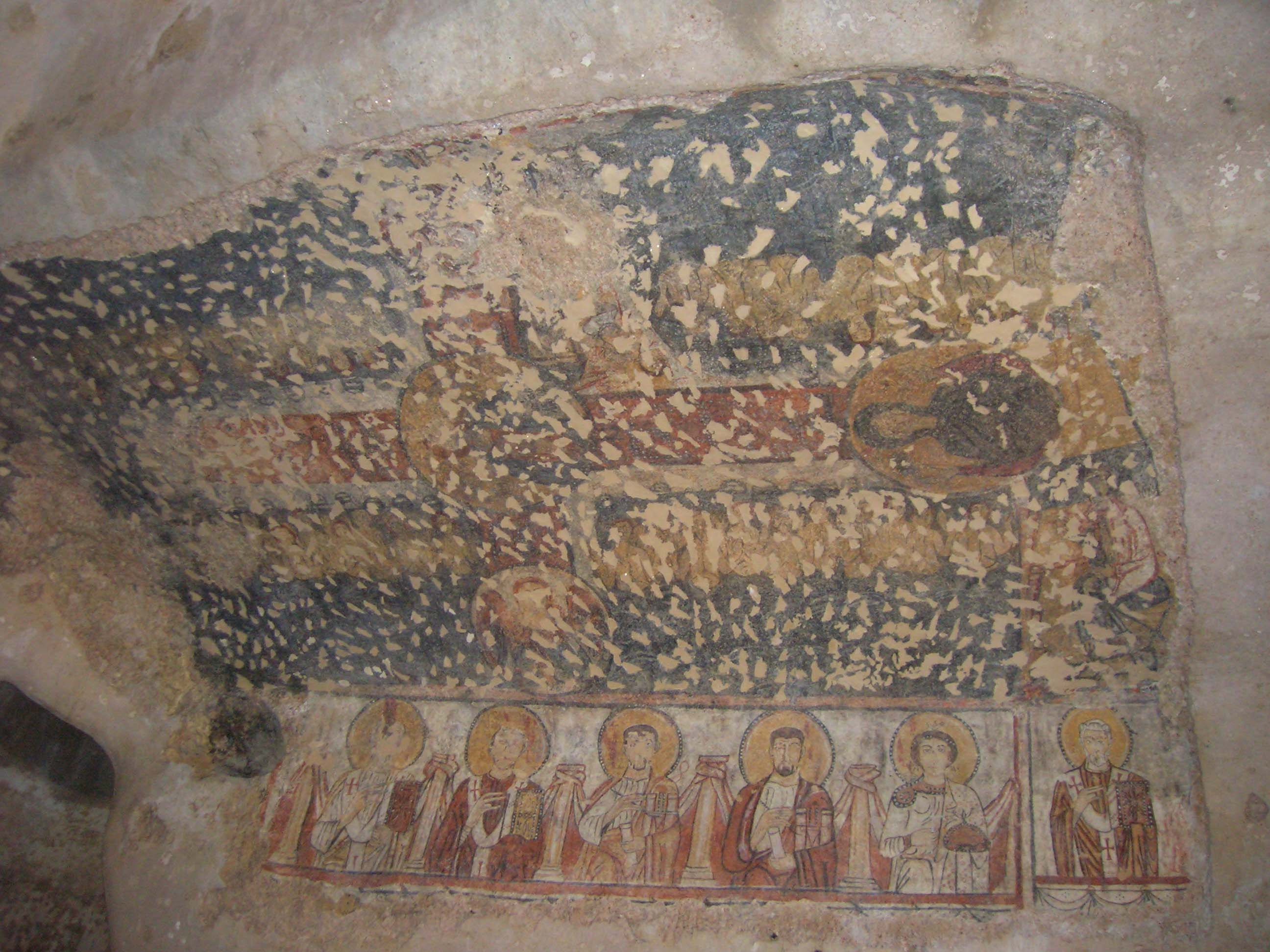
Catacombs of Santa Lucia: fresco of the Forty Martyrs of Sebaste, 8th century

"Here Marcianus is depicted in a frontal, half-length position within an isolated panel larger than the one containing the other saints. The protobishop is depicted wearing a monastic tonsure, a snow-white beard and hair, and his head surrounded by a beaded golden halo. He wears a tight tunic of which the close-fitting sleeve can be glimpsed under the broad liturgical robe, the red chlamys or phelonion, and a white omophorion marked by three crosses with patent ends, an episcopal insignia."

— Marcian of Syracuse in Sicilian iconography cit. Massara & Francesca Paola (2012, p. 282).

In the oratory of the Most Holy Forty Martyrs of Sebaste, a site named after the fresco of the same name above it, located inside the catacombs of Santa Lucia, the figure of Saint Marcian, dressed in Eastern church vestments, stands out on the right; the omophorion was already in use among Eastern bishops in the fourth and fifth centuries. This figure of Marcian, representing his first rediscovery, whose Greek caption was read by archaeologist Paolo Orsi, was used for the overall dating of the fresco. The painting was executed between the eighth and ninth centuries; this dating corresponds with the earliest literary records of Marcian's life; evidence, therefore, of the spread of the cult of the saint.

The iconography of Marcianus, the mature appearance given to him and the white head could represent a reference to the figure of the apostle Peter.

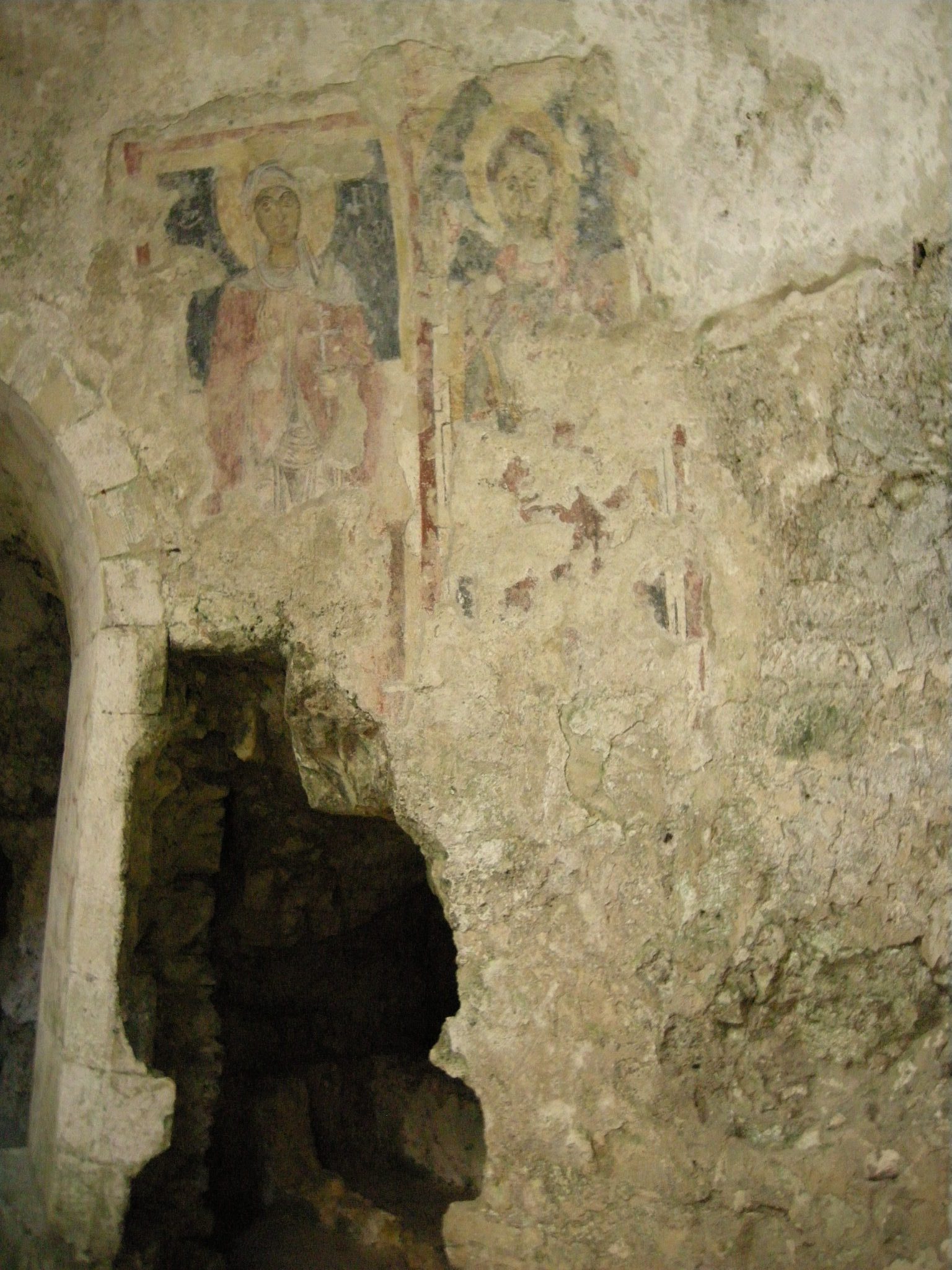
Fresco from the crypt of Saint Marcianus: the two figures of Lucy and Marcianus

Similarities are also revealed with the frescoes of the Commodilla catacomb in Rome (6th century) and with the early medieval frescoes, also Roman, of the Pontian and Generosa catacombs. There are also similarities with other Roman sites, suggesting a privileged relationship between the two geographical cultures.

In the so-called crypt of St. Marcian, one can see in the apse part a panel containing a fresco depicting the eponymous saint, alongside the patron saint of Syracuse, Lucy.

"The figure of Marcianus is next to that of St. Lucy, identified by the caption in Latin; both are within two separate and juxtaposed panels, painted on the irregular apse wall, set off-center slightly to the left on a palimpsest wall, whose earlier layers are now illegible."

— Marcian of Syracuse in Sicilian iconography cit. Massara & Francesca Paola (2012, p. 288).

Tradition has it that the tomb of the protobishop Marcianus was located in this subterranean site, but archaeological data does not confirm the antiquity of the site in the first century, but rather elements from the fourth and fifth centuries. The site originated as an early Christian hypogeum. It was later restored with the arrival of the Byzantines - Orsi describes the crypt as a small Byzantine basilica. Under Arab rule, the site was probably plundered and abandoned. Finally, with the arrival of the Normans, it was transformed and its tombs became loca sancta.

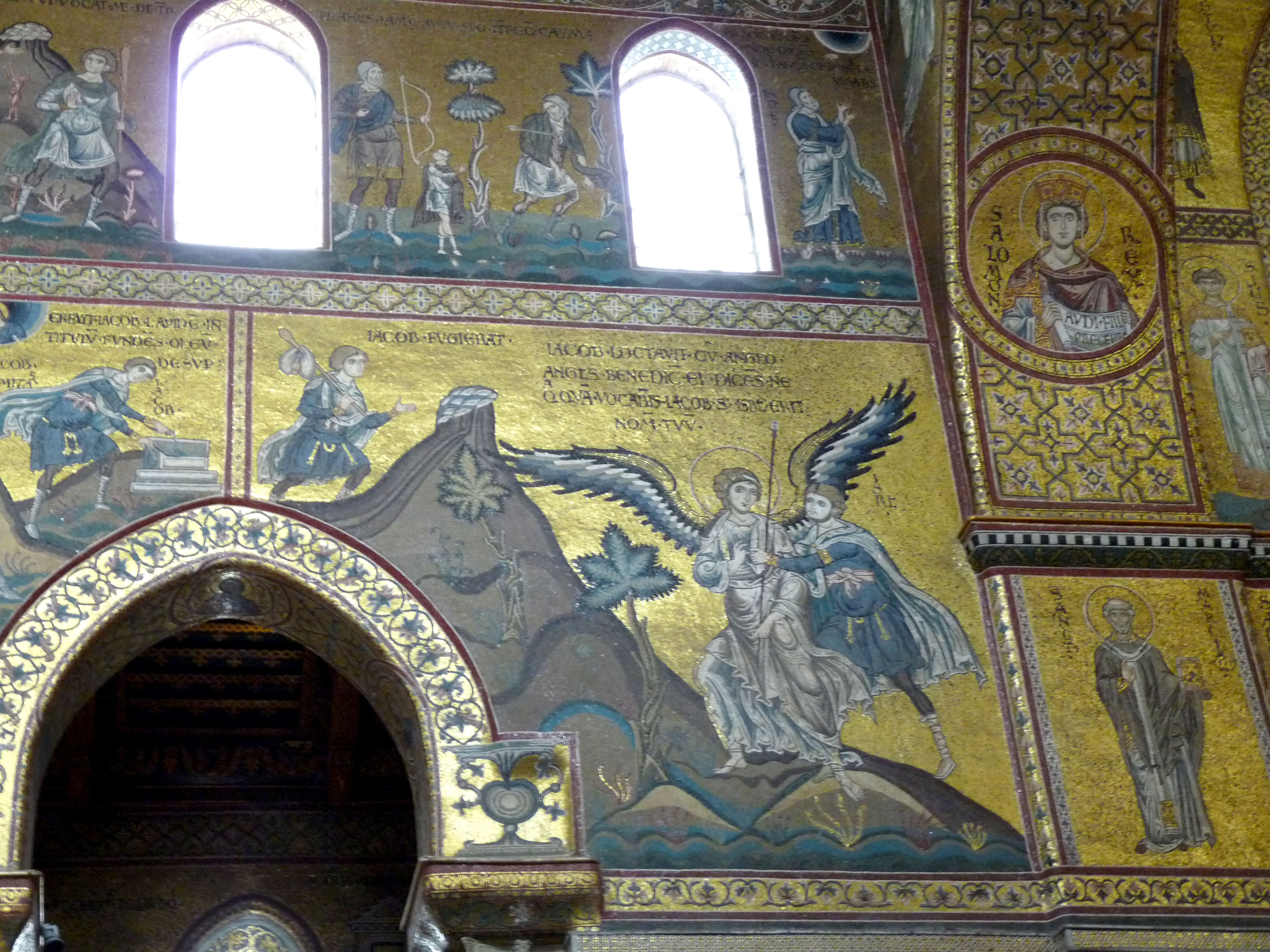
Saint Marcian mosaic (12th century) on the nave of Monreale Cathedral: next to the last image of the Old Testament and below the effigy of King Solomon

When the archaeologist Biagio Pace entered the crypt, he recognised the place described by the Byzantine hagiographer, author of the famous Encomium. The "antri pelopii" would mean "Greek construction". Paolo Orsi, while acknowledging the presence of several venerated tombs in the cave, doubts that such an ancient martyr's tomb could have been found there.

A few centuries later, around 1200, an effigy of the protobishop Marcianus appeared on the nave of the cathedral of Monreale, placed in the presbytery of the building. Between the ecclesiastical see of Monreale, adjacent to Palermo, and that of Syracuse there was also a strong historical connection. After the Islamic conquest many secular balances in ancient Sicily changed. Thus, with the arrival of the Normans, Syracuse lost its title of capital of the island, which passed to Palermo: the former seat of the Emirs. Then the Norman king William II requested and obtained from the Roman Curia, in 1188, by amendment of Pope Clement III, that the Church of Syracuse become suffragan of Monreale. A situation that would remain unchanged until the nineteenth century.

In this mosaic, Marcianus is represented with the pallium and the purple robe worn by the martyrs. The present Latin inscription reads Marcialis instead of Marcianus, due to an error made during a restoration. The style and iconography of this mosaic seem to recall certain physical aspects (slender body, gestures and beard) of the protobishop in the catacomb fresco of the Forty Martyrs of Sebaste.

== Relics ==
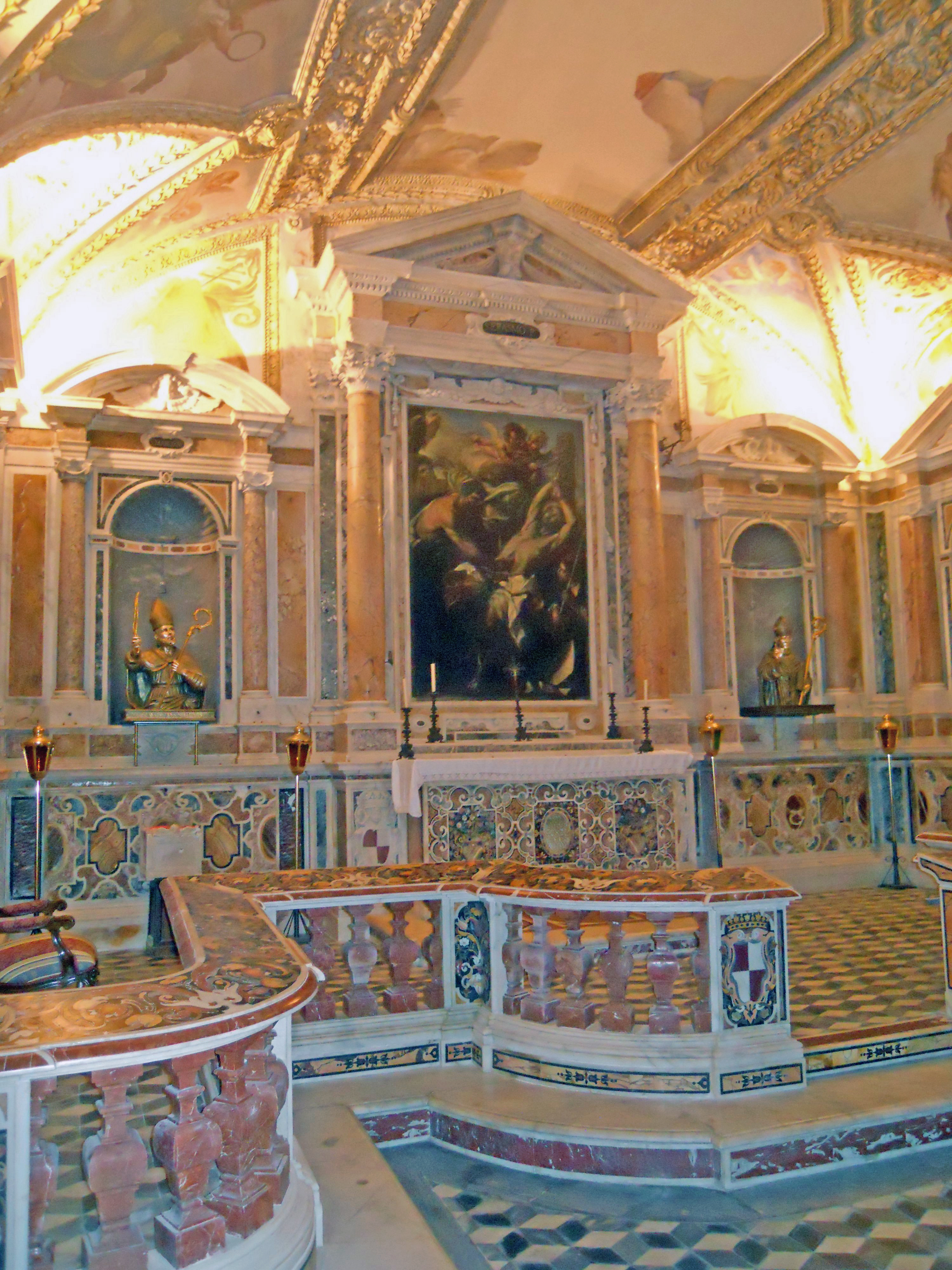
Saint Marcian's relics, housed in the bust depicting the saint (left) and under the altar, in the crypt of St. Erasmus in Gaeta Cathedral

Tradition has it that St. Marcian's body was kept inside the crypt dedicated to the saint, later overlooked by the Byzantine-era basilica.

A possible very early date for the crypt is supported by the archaeological discovery made by Paolo Orsi in the adjacent catacomb of San Giovanni, of a series of cubicula and arcosolia dating back to the 3rd century, and since, as the scholar Barreca points out, the crypt is located at the beginning of this catacomb complex, it is very likely that its foundation predates the tombs placed in front of it, and that these were the result of the well-known Christian custom of burying the dead next to the tomb of a martyr.

In any case, tradition has it that the body of the martyr lay there for eight centuries, until Syracuse was conquered by the Arabs in 878, although other sources say that it was during the first attempt to conquer the city in 827–828.

Therefore, in order to keep the body of the protobishop safe, the Syracusans took the urn containing Marcian's remains and transported it to Greece, to the Basilica of St Theodore in Patras, Achaia.

How the relics made their way from Achaia to Gaeta remains a mystery that the sources do not help to solve. According to one tradition, the Gaetan merchants, who often travelled to the East, arrived with their ships at the site of this holy deposit and, after buying it, brought it back to their city, Gaeta. The people of Gaeta then chose Marcianus as their first patron saint, as St Erasmus would not arrive there until the 10th century. In modern times, the relics of Marcianus find their place in the Cathedral of Saints Erasmus and Marcianus and St Mary of the Assumption, dedicated to the two patron saints of Gaeta, in the underground chapel called the Crypt.

However, some of the saint's relics remained in Syracuse, and the city's cathedral housed the reliquary of St Marcian's arm, which was later donated in the 12th century by the English bishop Richard Palmer, then head of the church of Syracuse, to the treasury of the cathedral of Messina, its final destination.

== See also ==
- Roman Catholic Archdiocese of Siracusa

== Bibliography ==
- Monumenta Germaniae Historica. OCLC 649268467. Archived from the original on 2015-10-07.
- Migne, Jacques Paul (1853). Patrologia Latina. OCLC 173749943.
- De S. Marciano martyre, episcopo syracusano in Sicilia, in Acta Sanctorum, Junii tomus tertius, Parigi e Roma 1867, pp. 275–283.
- Bibliotheca hagiographica graeca. Bruxelles. 1909. OCLC 1745688.
- Società di storia patria per la Sicilia orientale; Deputazione di storia patria per la Sicilia. Sezione di Catania (1904). Archivio storico per la Sicilia orientale. Catania Società di storia patria per la Sicilia orientale. OCLC 1737288.
- Francesco Lanzoni (1927). Le diocesi d'Italia dalle origini al principio del secolo VII (an.604): studio critico. Faenza, F. Lega. OCLC 836951152.
- Clara Gebbia (1979). "Comunità ebraiche nella Sicilia imperiale e tardo antica". Archivio Storico Sicilia Orientale. Vol. 75. pp. 241–275.
- Rivista di storia della chiesa in Italia. Roma: Istituto grafico tiberino. 1982.
- Istituto di studi bizantini e neoellenici (1990). Rivista di studi bizantini e neoellenici. Vol. 27. Università di Roma.
- Salvatore Pricoco (1991). Sicilia e Italia suburbicaria tra IV e VIII secolo. Rubbettino.
- Clara Gebbia (1996). Presenze giudaiche nella Sicilia antica e tardoantica. Bretschneider.
- Istituto di studi bizantini e neoellenici (2001). Rivista di studi bizantini e neoellenici. Vol. 37. Università di Roma.
- Angela Scandaliato, Nuccio Mulè (2002). La sinagoga e il bagno rituale degli ebrei di Siracusa. con una nota epigrafica di Cesare Colafemmina. Firenze: Casa Editrice Giuntina. ISBN 978-88-8057-158-2.
- Francesco Paolo Rizzo (2003). "Un raro syngramma nella tradizione scritta sui santi Peregrino e Libertino". In Ruggieri, Pieralli (ed.). Eukosmia, studi miscellanei. Rubbettino Editore. pp. 400–427.
- Daniela Motta (2004). Percorsi dell'agiografia: società e cultura nella Sicilia tardoantica e bizantina. Edizioni del Prisma.
- Campione, Ada (2005). "Il Martirologio Geronimiano e la Sicilia:esempi di agiografia regionale". Vetera Christianorum. 42: 15–35.
- Francesco Paolo Rizzo (2006). Sicilia cristiana dal I al V secolo. Vol. 2. G. Bretschneider.
- Massara, Francesca Paola (2012). "Marciano di Siracusa nell'iconografia siciliana, in Vescovi, Sicilia, Mediterraneo nella tarda antichità. Atti del Convegno". In Messana, Lombino, Costanza (ed.). Vescovi, Sicilia, Mediterraneo nella tarda antichità: atti del I convegno di studi; (Palermo, 29 - 30 ottobre 2010). Salvatore Sciascia. pp. 275–292.
- Stephanos Efthymiadis (2013). The Ashgate Research Companion to Byzantine Hagiography. Periods and Places. Vol. 1. Ashgate Publishing, Ltd.
- Caruso Federico, Iafrate Stefano, Lizzani Federico, Le grotte pelopie ed il culto di San Marciano a Siracusa, in Antrum, Riti e simbologie delle grotte del Mediterraneo Antico, Quaderni di Studi e Materiali di Storia delle Religioni, 16, Brescia, Morcelliana, 2017, pp. 308–323.
