= Jean Gamans =

German hagiographer

Jean Gamans SJ
- Church: Catholic Church

Personal details
- Born: 8 July 1606
- Died: 25 November 1684 (aged 78); Aschaffenburg

Jean Gamans, SJ (8 July 1606 – 25 November 1684) was a German Jesuit hagiographer.

== Life ==
Gamans was born on 8 July 1606, in either Ahrweiler or neighboring Neuenahr, depending on the sources, in today's Rhineland-Palatinate, Germany. There does not appear to exist any documentary evidence to show that he was born at the little town of Eupen, as stated in the "Bibliothèque des écrivains de la Compagnie de Jésus".

He entered the Society of Jesus at Trier on 24 April 1623, having studied the humanities for five years and philosophy for two years at Cologne, where he had received the degree of Master of Arts. After making his novitiate, he devoted several months to a revision of his philosophical studies, and subsequently, from 1626, spent five years teaching in the college of Würzburg, conducting his pupils through the five classes which comprised the complete course in humanities.

He then studied theology for a year at Mainz (1631), after which, the houses of his province of the Upper Rhine being suppressed during the intervention by Sweden in the Thirty Years' War, he continued his theological studies for three years at Douai, where he was ordained priest on 26 March 1633. These studies having come to an end in 1634, he discharged for several years the duties of chaplain to the land and naval troops in Belgium and Germany. He is mentioned under this title (Castrensis) in the catalogue of the Flandro-Belgian province for 1641 as being attached to the professed house at Antwerp, where he made his profession of the four vows on 26 December of the same year.

He lived here with the first two Bollandists, Jean Bolland and Godefroid Henschen. He became an active collaborator. He was then at Baden-Baden, where he resided for some time in order to direct the studies of the young princes of the House of Baden. Records show him there in 1641, and 1649. At the end of this latter year he resided in a missionary capacity at Ettlingen near Karlsruhe.

In 1681, he was attached to the College of Aschaffenburg near Frankfort, where he died 25 November 1684.

== Works ==
For more than thirty years, it is stated in the death notice inserted in the Annual letters of the College of Aschaffenburg for that year, he was so immersed in the hagiographical researches which he had undertaken in behalf of his associates at Antwerp that he devoted to them even the hours of the night, taking only a short rest on the floor or a strip of matting. His name occurs often in the Acta Sanctorum at the head of documents transcribed by his hand, and of commentaries written entirely by him (cf. "Bibl. des écriv. de la C. de J", sv. "Gamans").

A large number of surviving papers of this description were in the manuscript collection of the early Bollandists preserved at the Royal Library of Brussels and in the modern Bollandist library. Most of his papers, dispatched to the Bollandists after his death, were in fact lost when the vessel bearing them sank in the Main River. Gamans had also collected a mass of material for a "Metropolis Moguntina", which he wished to compose on the model of the "Metropolis Salisburgensis" published by Hund in 1582, and also for a history of the grand ducal House of Baden. As many as eight manuscripts of the latter work are known to exist.
