= François Baert =

The Reverend François Baert
- Born: François Baert; 25 August 1651; Ypres, Spanish Netherlands (now Belgium)
- Died: 27 October 1719 (aged 68); Antwerp, Spanish Netherlands
- Occupations: Jesuit priest, hagiographer
- Known for: Work on the Acta Sanctorum as a Bollandist
- Religion: Roman Catholic

François Baert (25 August 1651 – 27 October 1719) was a Jesuit hagiographer, one of the Bollandists, from the Spanish Netherlands.

Born in Ypres on 25 August 1651, Baert entered the Society of Jesus at the novitiate of Mechlin, 28 September 1667. After completing his early formation he was teacher in several high schools of the Belgian province, studied philosophy and theology, and was finally ordained priest in 1680. The following year, 1681, he was made assistant to Daniel Papebroch, the last survivor of the first generation of Bollandists.

The name of Baertius is on the title pages of nine of the volumes of the Acta Sanctorum; the last four of May, and of the first five of June; but to judge from the articles published in these volumes his collaboration is by no means so large as these figures would indicate. There are no articles bearing his signature either in the volumes for May nor in the fifth volume for June. The other four volumes for June contain some fifteen articles by him, all very short excepting the commentaries on Columba and Basil the Great, of the date of 9 June. On an appendix to the st. Basil entry he pointed out the various inconsistencies in the Pseudo-Ampholochian apocryphal vita.

In 1688, in company with Conrad Janninck, he made a trip to Austria and Hungary in search of hagiographical material; the journey lasted eight months and the two returned with a large number of documents.

Baert died in Antwerp on 27 October 1719.
