= Conrad Janninck =

Conrad Janninck SJ (Latin: Conrad Janningus; 1650–1723) was one of the Bollandists who worked on the Acta Sanctorum. Janninck edited twelve volumes covering May 5 through July 11.

== Biography ==
Janninck was born in 1650 in Groningen. He had joined the Jesuits and was teaching Greek in Mechelen when in March 1679, while still a scholastic, he was called to Antwerp. In 1670 John Ravesteyn had been assigned to assist Godfrey Henschen and Daniel van Papenbroeck in the compiling the lives of the saints, but left after five years to take up parish work. Daniel Cardon took his place, but died in 1678 tending people stricken with the plague. Janninck succeeded Cardon.

In 1681 Papenbroeck applied for Janninck to be sent to Rome to take up his theological studies, and Janninck was replaced by François Baert of Ypres. Shortly after Baert's arrival Henschen died. Upon his return to Belgium, Janninck became one of the editors of the many volumes of the Acta Sanctorum.

Around 1695 his colleague Papenbroeck was under attack from the Spanish Inquisition and others opposed to the rigorous scholarly work of the Bollandists. Janninck spent almost three years in Rome on his behalf. His mission was successful in that the Holy See expressed no interest in confirming the Inquisition's condemnation.

Janninck also spent time in Austria and Hungary as well as Italy searching for relevant texts to aid in their efforts at recording the traditions regarding the early saints.

Janninck died in 1723.
