= Heribert Rosweyde =

Jesuit hagiographer

Heribert Rosweyde (20 January 1569, Utrecht – 5 October 1629, Antwerp) was a Jesuit hagiographer. His work, quite unfinished, was taken up by Jean Bolland who systematized it, while broadening its perspective. This is the beginning of the association of the Bollandists.

== Life ==
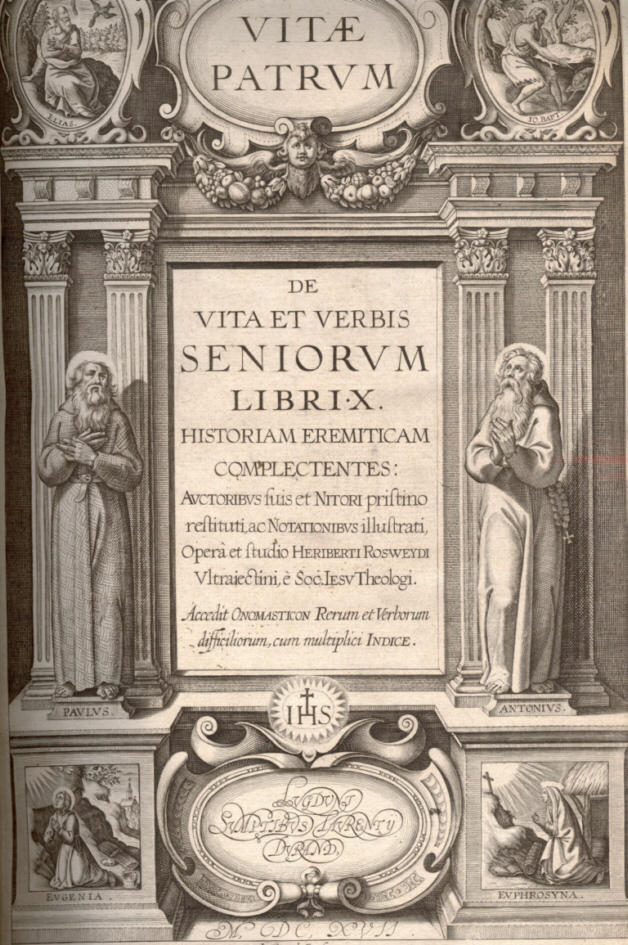
Vitae patrum von Heribert Rosweyde 1615

Most archival evidence indicates that Heibert Rosweyde was born in Utrecht on 20 January 1569. His family was part of the Catholic minority. Rosweyde attended the university of Douai, and entered the Society of Jesus in 1588. He became a professor of philosophy at the Jesuit college at Douai.

== Research ==
Rosweyde devoted his leisure to the libraries of the monasteries of Hainaut and French Flanders. He copied with his own hand a vast number of documents relating to church history in general, and to hagiography in particular, and found in the old texts contained in the manuscripts coming under his observation quite a different flavour from that of the revisions to which many editors, notably the 16th century hagiographers, Lippomano and Surius, then the latest and most celebrated, had believed it necessary to subject them.

== Plan ==
Rosweyde thought it would be a useful work to publish the texts in their original form. His superiors, to whom he submitted his plan in 1603, gave it their approval, and allowed him to prepare the projected edition, without, however, relieving him of other occupations. At that time Rosweyde was serving as prefect of studies in Antwerp, but was soon sent to St Omer to replace a professor of apologetics who had fallen ill. He did not return to Antwerp until 1606.

There were about 1300 manuscripts regarding lives of the saints in the libraries of Belgium. Rosweyde obtained copies of most of them. He pursued his project, which he announced publicly in 1607, as well as the plan he proposed to follow. Under the title: Fasti sanctorum quorum vitae in belgicis bibliothecis manuscriptiae, he gave in a little volume in 16mo., published by the Plantin press at Antwerp, an alphabetical list of the names of the saints whose acts had been either found by him or called to his attention in old manuscript collections. This list filled fifty pages; the prefatory notice in which he indicates the character and arrangement of his work, as he had conceived it, takes up fourteen. Finally, the work contains an appendix of twenty-six pages containing the unpublished acts of the passion of the Cilician martyrs, Tharsacus, Probus, and Andronicus, which Rosweyde regarded—wrongly—as the authentic official report from the pen of a clerk of the court of the Roman tribunal.

According to this programme the collection was to comprise sixteen volumes, besides two volumes of explanations and tables. The first volume was to present documents concerning the life of Jesus Christ and the feasts established in honour of the special events of his life; the second volume would be devoted to the life and the feasts of the Virgin Mary, and the third to the feasts of the saints honoured with a more special cult. The twelve succeeding volumes were to give the lives of the saints whose feasts are celebrated respectively in the twelve months of the year, one volume for each month. This calendar arrangement had been prescribed by his superiors, in preference to the chronological order Rosweyde himself favoured. But this presented, especially at that time, formidable difficulties. Lastly, the sixteenth volume was to set forth the succession of martyrologies which had been in use at different periods and in the various churches of Christendom. The first of the two supplementary volumes was to contain notes and commentaries bearing on the lives divided into eight books treating among other subjects: the authors of the lives, the sufferings of the martyrs, and the images of the saints.

The other supplement was to present a series of copious tables giving:

- the names of the saints whose lives had been published in the preceding volumes;
- the same names followed by notes indicating the place of each saint's birth, their station in life, their title to sanctity, the time and place in which they lived, and the authors of their lives;
- the state of life of the various saints (religious, priest, virgin, widow, etc.);
- their position in the Church (apostle, bishop, abbot, etc.);
- the nomenclature of the saints according to the countries made illustrious by their birth, apostolate, sojourn, burial;
- nomenclature of the places in which they are honoured with a special cult;
- enumeration of the maladies for the cure of which they are especially invoked;
- the professions placed under their patronage;
- the proper names of persons and places encountered in the published lives;
- the passages of Holy Scripture there explained;
- points which may be of use in religious controversies;
- those applicable in the teaching of Christian doctrine;
- a general table of words and things in alphabetical order.

"And others still," Rosweyde wrote, "if anything of importance presents itself, of which our readers may give us an idea."

The Fasti was published as a sort of advertisement, which Rosweyde distributed in hopes of gaining support. Cardinal Bellarmine, to whom Rosweyde sent a copy of his little volume, reportedly exclaimed after reading Rosweyde's programme: "This man counts, then, on living two hundred years longer!" He sent Rosweyde a letter, the original of which is preserved in the present library of the Bollandists, signed, but not written by the hand of Bellarmine, in which he intimated that he regarded the plan as chimerical. Bellarmine suggested that Rosweyde focus his efforts on those saints not already published by Surius.

Rosweyde was not disconcerted by this. He received encouragement, enthusiastic praise, and valuable assistance from various other sources. The new enterprise found an especial protector in Antoine de Wynghe, abbot of the Liessies Abbey in the now Nord department of France. The large sympathy of this patron manifested itself in every way; in letters of recommendation to the heads of the various houses of the great Benedictine Order which opened to Rosweyde and his associates monastic libraries; in loans and gifts of books, of manuscripts, and of copies of manuscripts; and in pecuniary assistance.

Rosweyde counted on completing the project by his own efforts. As a matter of fact, he did not get beyond the first stages of the structure. In 1609 he was sent to Courtrai, and when the prefect of studies died, Rosweyde was required to assume those duties. His literary activity was expended on a multitude of historical works, both religious and polemical, some of which would have later formed a part of the great hagiographical compilation, but the majority of which bear no relation whatever to the work. At the time of Rosweyde's death in Antwerp in 1629, not a page was ready for the printer.

His labour was not lost however, as Jean Bolland, entrusted with going through the papers and documents gathered by Rosweyde saw the value of them all and embarked on the vast project identified later with the association of the Bollandists. The first volume of the Acta Sanctorum came out of the press in 1643.

The writings which would have been available are: the edition of the Little Roman Martyrology, in which Rosweyde believed he recognized the collection mentioned by Gregory the Great in his letter to Eulogius of Alexandria; the edition of the martyrology of Ado of Vienne (1613).

Rosweyde apparently commissioned and dedicated to de Wynghe an emblematic work of fifty plates of hermits, engraved by Boetius à Bolswert to designs by Abraham Bloemaert (Sylva Anachoretica Ægypti Et Palæstinæ. Figuris Æneis Et Brevibus Vitarum Elogiis Expressa. (Hendrick Aertssens, Antwerp 1619).

The rest, however, as for instance the Dutch edition of Ribadeneira's Flowers of the Saints (1619, two folio volumes), the General History of the Church (1623), to which he added as an appendix the detailed history of the Church in the Netherlands, both in Dutch; the Flemish lives of St. Ignatius and St. Philip Neri; the Flemish translation of the first part of the Treatise on Perfection, drew his attention completely from what he should have regarded as his principal task.

== Works ==
- Vitae patrum: the ten books of the Lives of the Fathers of the Desert, which he first published in Latin (1615 in fol.), dedicating the work to the Abbot of Liessies, and later in Dutch (1617) in fol., with an inscription to Jeanne de Bailliencourt, Abbess of Messines.

== Bibliography ==
- COENS, Maurice: 'Héribert Rosweyde et la recherche des documents. Un témoignage inédit', in Analecta Bollandiana, vol.83, 1965.
- Hippolyte Delehaye: L'oeuvre des Bollandistes à travers trois siecles 1615-1915, Bruxelles, 1959.
- F.W.H. Hollstein, Dutch and Flemish etchings, engravings and woodcuts ca. 1450-1700, (1949- ).
