= Peter van der Bosch =

Flemish Jesuit hagiographer

Peter van der Bosch (19 October 1686, in Brussels – 14 November 1736) was a Bollandist (Jesuit hagiographer).

After studying the humanities at the College of Brussels from 1698 to 1705, he entered the novitiate of the Society of Jesus at Mechlin on 25 September 1705. At the close of his novitiate he studied philosophy at Antwerp, 1707–09, and then spent a year in Italy to complete his literary training. Recalled to Antwerp in 1710, he spent six years in teaching and then went to Leuven, where he took a theological course, 1716–20. He was ordained priest at Leuven in 1719 and distinguished himself by the public defense of theses in March and September 1719, and by his defence "De Universa Theologia" in 1720. In 1721, at the end of his third year of probation, he was made an assistant to the Bollandists and remained a member of this body during the rest of his life. His hagiographical writings are found in July, IV-VI, and August, I-III.
