= Godfrey Henschen =

Jesuit hagiographer

Godfrey Henschen SJ
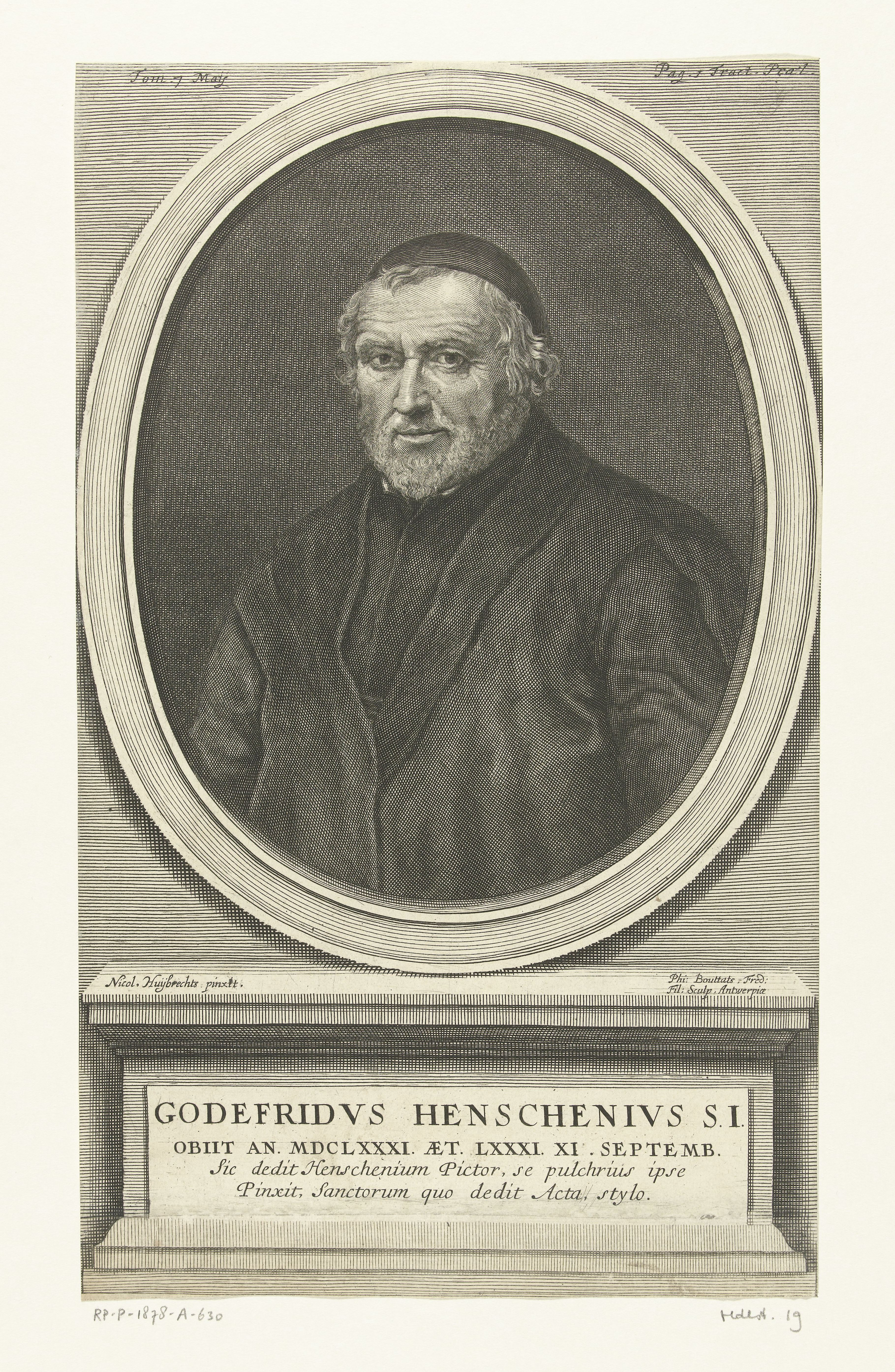
- Gottfried Henschen, S.J. (engraving by Philibert Bouttats, 1680)
- Church: Catholic Church

Orders
- Ordination: 16 April 1634

Personal details
- Born: 21 June 1601 Venray, Limburg
- Died: 11 September 1681 (aged 80) Antwerp, Belgium
- Occupation: Hagiographer

Godfrey Henschen or Henskens (1601–1681), Latinized Godefridus Henschenius, was a Jesuit hagiographer from the Spanish Netherlands, one of the first Bollandists.

== Life ==
Henschen was born on 21 June 1601 at Venray, Limburg, in the Low Countries. He was the son of Henry Henschen, a cloth merchant, and Sibylla Pauwels. He studied the humanities at the Jesuit college of 's-Hertogenbosch and entered the novitiate of the Society of Jesus in Mechelen on 22 October 1619. He taught successively Greek, poetry and rhetoric at Bergues, Bailleul, Ypres, and Ghent. He was ordained a priest on 16 April 1634, sent to the professed house at Antwerp the following year, and admitted to the profession of the four Jesuit vows on 12 May 1636.

== Career ==
Henschen had been a pupil of Jean Bolland. From the time of his arrival in the city he was associated as a collaborator with Bolland, who was then preparing the first volumes of the Acta Sanctorum. Bolland had asked for an assistant, a request supported by the abbot of Liessies Abbey, Antoine de Wynghe. In 1635 Henschen was assigned to start work on the February saints, while Bolland gave himself to the preparing the material for January. It was Henschen who, by his commentary on the Acts of St. Amand, suggested to Bolland the course to follow, and gave to the work undertaken by his mentor its definitive form. Henschen compared the different manuscripts regarding a particular saint, resolved obscure passages, and placed the saint in the context of his/her times and contemporaries. After fourteen years of work, the two volumes for January were printed in Antwerp in 1643 and greeted with enthusiasm by scholars.

Work on the January volume was done in two garrets where Bolland kept his papers and books. As climbing the steep steps began to prove difficult, he asked for and obtained the use of a vacant room on the second floor, which later became the Bollandist Museum. The three volumes for February were released in 1658, and was equally well received.

=== Trip to Rome ===
In July 1660, at Bolland's direction, Henschen and Daniel van Papenbroek journeyed to Rome by way of Germany and the Tyrol, collecting ancient documents for their studies along the way. They stayed in Rome for nine months and returned by way of France They received a warm welcome and much assistance from Lucas Holstenius, head of the Vatican Library, who placed at their disposal all the hagiographical manuscripts in the Roman libraries. The five or six copyists placed at their disposal were kept constantly busy during their time in Rome in transcribing manuscripts according to their directions, and this occupation was continued by them a long time after the Bollandists departure. Holstenius died during their stay at Rome, and his successor, Peter Allatius, who had his own pretensions of publishing, proved less amicable. After a stay of about nine months they returned by way of Paris, where they spent over three months transcribing and collating, besides enlisting the services of several copyists. They also came back with new subscriptions to the Acta Sanctorum. After Bolland's death in 1665, he and Papenbroek began to lead the project. They were joined in 1670 by John Ravesteyn, who after five years left to take up parish work.

== Later life ==
Henschen was the first librarian of the Museum Bollandianum at Antwerp. In March 1668, he and Papenbroek set out on a second journey, but Henschen fell in Luxembourg. After that Papenbroek took over much of scientific aspects of the work. Henschen continued to work on the Acta Sanctorum up to the time of his death.

In total Henschen collaborated on the volumes for January, February, March, and April, and on the first six volumes for May, that is on seventeen volumes of the Acta Sanctorum. Several of his posthumous commentaries appeared in the succeeding volumes.

He died at Antwerp, aged 80, on 11 September 1681.

== Sources ==
- Daniel van Papenbroek, De vitâ, operibus, et virtutibus God. Henschenii in Acta Sanctorum, VII, May
- Jozef Habets, Godfried Henschenius medestichter der Acta Sanctorum (Maastricht, 1868).
- Delehaye, Hippolyte. The work of the Bollandists through three centuries (1615–1915), Brussels, Society of Bollandists, 1959

Attribution
