= Daniel Papebroch =

Flemish Jesuit hagiographer (1628–1714)

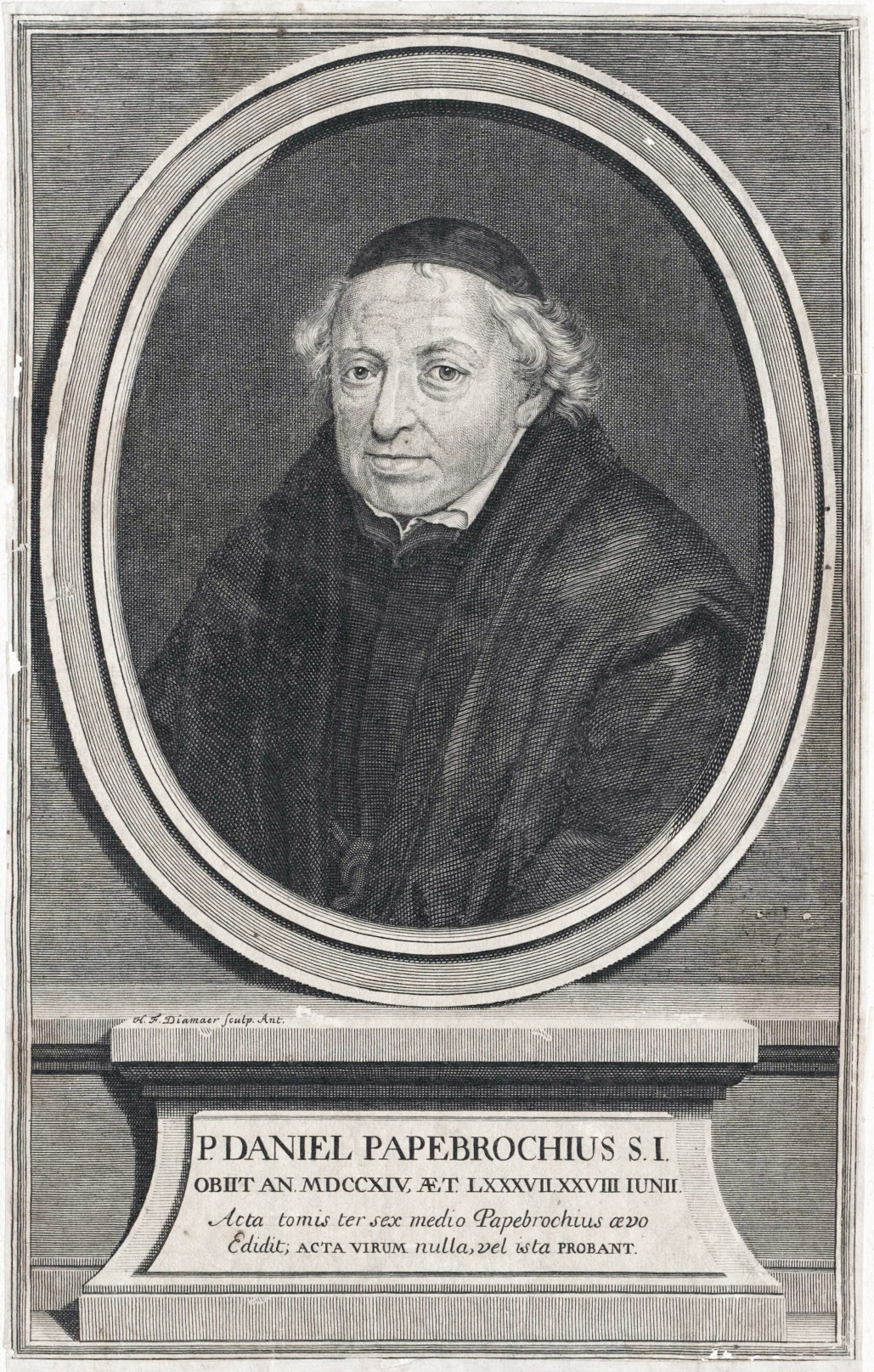
- An image of Daniel Papebroch, S.J. (1680)
- Born: 17 March 1628; Antwerp, Duchy of Brabant, Spanish Netherlands
- Died: 28 June 1714 (aged 86)
- Other name: Daniel van Papenbroeck
- Occupation: Hagiographer
- Organization: Bollandists

Daniel Papebroch, SJ, (17 March 1628 – 28 June 1714) was a Flemish Jesuit hagiographer, one of the Bollandists. He was a leading revisionist figure, bringing historical criticism to bear on traditions of saints of the Catholic Church.

== Life ==
Papebroch was born in 1628, the son of a wealthy merchant of Antwerp, then in the Duchy of Brabant, part of the Spanish Netherlands. He attended the Jesuit college in his hometown. He came from a pious family that had chosen Jesuit Jean Bolland as its spiritual director. Bolland took a great interest in Daniel's education and encouraged him to learn Greek and other languages and to study literary composition. From 1644 to 1646 Papebroch studied philosophy at Douai, after which he entered the novitiate of the Society of Jesus. He was ordained a Catholic priest in 1658.

In 1659 Papebroch began his work with Bolland, in the scholarly study of the hagiography of the Catholic saints. About this time, the Jesuit superiors of the order relieved those involved with the work of every other regular occupation, in order that they might thenceforth devote their entire time to the hagiographical work. He was assigned to work on the records of those saints celebrated in the month of March. In July of that year, Bolland sent the 32-year-old Papebroch to Italy, along with Godfrey Henschen, to collect documents, but by the time he returned Bolland had died. Papebroch, together with Henschen, then continued the work in the tradition of the Bollandists. He continued this work until his death in 1714.

== Scholarship ==
Herbert Thurston considered Pabenbroch "the ablest of all the early Bollandists." According to Friedrich Heer, Pabenbroch "...by dint of hard work established the laws of historical criticism, the methodology of the study of sources and of the historical auxiliary sciences. Hippolyte Delehaye called Papebroch "the Bollandist par excellence".

Janninck said of his colleague, "What Rosweyde had laid the groundwork for, what Bolland had initiated, what Henschenius had given shape to, Papebroch brought to completion."

== Controversies ==
Papebroch prefixed a Propylaeum antiquarium, an attempt to formulate rules for the discernment of spurious from genuine documents, to the second volume (1675) of the Acta Sanctorum. He instanced in it as spurious some charters of the Abbey of St-Denis. Dom Jean Mabillon was appointed to draw up a defense of these documents, and was provoked into another statement of the principles of documentary criticism, his De re diplomatica (1681).

Around 1681 Papebroch found himself in a lengthy dispute with the Carmelites. In writing a commentary on Albert of Vercelli, credited with the Carmelite Rule, Papebroch said that the tradition that the origin of the order dated back to the prophet Elias, as its founder, was insufficiently grounded. The Carmelites took exception. There followed a long pamphlet campaign, during which Papebroch's orthodoxy was challenged. Papebroch was defended by his colleague, Conrad Janninck. The Carmelites appealed to the tribunal of the Spanish Inquisition, which in November, 1695, issued a decree condemning the fourteen volumes of the Acta Sanctorum published up to that time and branding it heretical. Rome did not confirm the condemnation in Spain. In November 1698, Pope Innocent XII issued a brief that ended the controversy by imposing silence on both parties.

Another controversy Papebroch had was with the Dominican friar, Jean-Antoine d'Aubermont, over some major liturgical texts traditionally attributed to St. Thomas Aquinas.

== Sources ==
- Kinderman, Udo (1975). "Daniel Papebrochs Reisebericht über Nürnberg, Ellingen, Weißenburg und Eichstätt aus dem Jahre 1660". Zeitschrift für bayerische Kirchengeschichte (in German). 44: 60–97.
- Ian Bradley, Celtic Christianity, Edinburgh University Press, 1999 ISBN 0-7486-1047-2 page 65
- Christopher Walter, 2003, The Warrior Saints in Byzantine Art and Tradition Ashgate Publishing, ISBN 1-84014-694-X page 110
