= Bollandist =

Group studying hagiography and the cult of saints in Christianity

Society of Bollandists
- Société des Bollandistes
- Named after: Jean Bolland
- Purpose: Hagiographic research
- President: Mark Rotsaert
- Website: https://bollandistes.org/

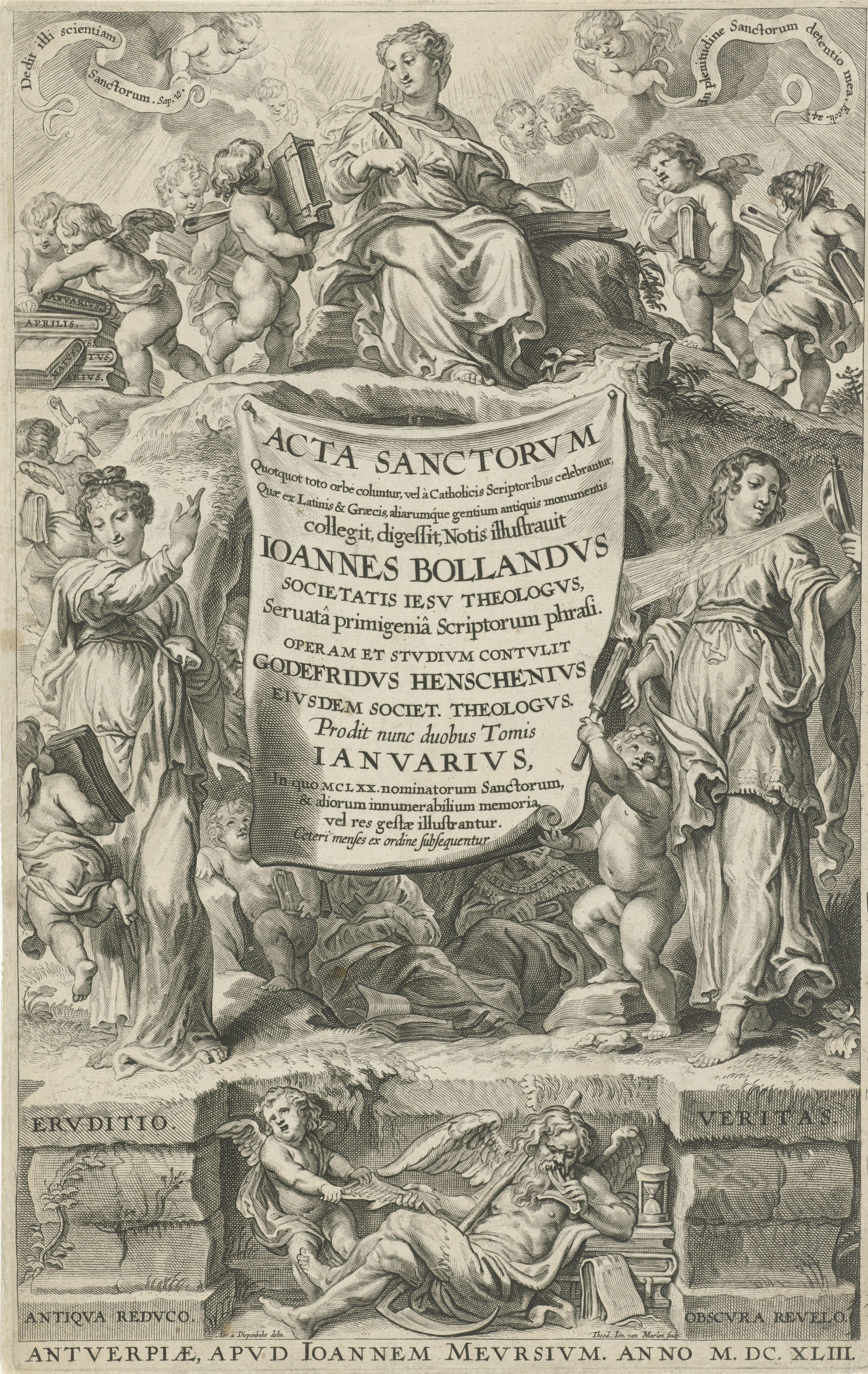
Acta Sanctorum (IANUARIUS 1643)

The Society of Bollandists (Latin: Societas Bollandistarum; French: Société des Bollandistes) is an association of scholars, philologists, and historians (originally all Jesuits, but now including non-Jesuits) who since the early seventeenth century have studied hagiography and the cult of the saints in Christianity. Their most important publication has been the Acta Sanctorum (The Acts of the Saints). They are named after the Flemish Jesuit Jean Bolland (1596–1665).

== Acta Sanctorum ==
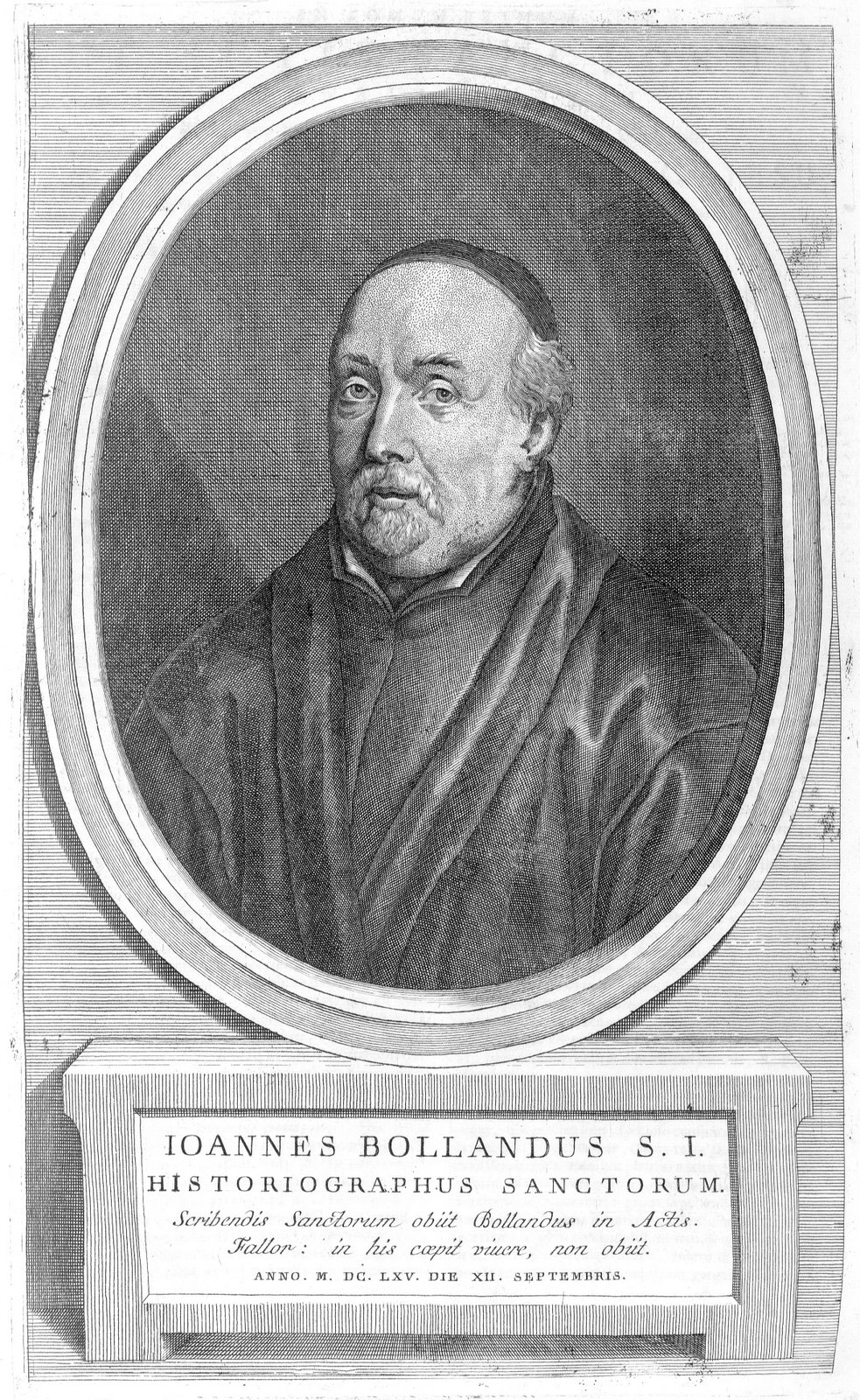
Jean Bolland

The idea of the Acta Sanctorum was first conceived by the Dutch Jesuit Heribert Rosweyde (1569–1629), who was a lecturer at the Jesuit college of Douai. Rosweyde used his leisure time to collect information about the lives of the saints. His principal work, the 1615 Vitae Patrum, became the foundation of the Acta Sanctorum. Rosweyde contracted a contagious disease while ministering to a dying man, and died himself on October 5, 1629, at the age of sixty.

Father Jean Bolland was prefect of studies in the Jesuit college of Mechelen. Upon the death of Rosweyde, Bolland was asked to review Rosweyde's papers. Bolland then continued the work from Antwerp.

The task was to search out and classify materials, to print what seemed to be the most reliable sources of information concerning the saints venerated by the Church and to illustrate points of difficulty. Underestimating the magnitude of the undertaking, Bolland initially thought he could finish the work on his own, but after a few years he had to admit that the undertaking was beyond his individual strength. He was then assigned an assistant, Godfrey Henschenius (1601–81). The first two volumes of the Acta, by Bolland and Henschenius, were published in Antwerp in 1643.

Unlike Rosweyde and Bolland, Henschenius was allowed to devote himself exclusively to the writing of the Acta. He solved many problems relating to chronology, geography and the philological interpretation of the sources. February, March, and April (that is, the collected hagiographies of saints whose feast days occur in each month) took up three volumes each, May covered eight, and June seven volumes. By the time of his death, 24 volumes had appeared; moreover, Henschenius left many notes and commentaries for the following volumes. It can therefore be said that the Acta owe their final form to Henschenius.

In 1659, Bolland and Henschenius were joined by Daniel Papebrochius (1628–1714), who devoted fifty-five years of his life to the Acta. From July 1660 until December 1662, Henschenius and Papebrochius travelled through Germany, Italy and France in order to collect copies of hagiographic manuscripts. Another Bollandist of this period was Jean Gamans.

=== Carmelite controversy ===
With publication in 1675 of the first volume of April, the Bollandists became embroiled in a lengthy controversy with the Carmelites. In writing of St. Albert, Patriarch of Jerusalem and author of the Carmelite rule, Papebrochius had stated in his preliminary commentary that the tradition universally received by the Carmelites that the origin of the order dated back to the prophet Elijah, who was regarded as its founder, was insufficiently grounded. But learning that the attacks could jeopardize the work of the group, he and his companions decided that the time for silence had passed. From 1681 to 1698 a series of letters, pamphlets and other documents was issued by each side. The Carmelites were supported by a Spanish tribunal, while the Bollandists had the support of Jean de Launoy and the Sorbonne. In November 1698, Pope Innocent XII ordered an end to the controversy.

By the time of the death of Father Papebrochius in 1714, the first six months of the year were practically completed. Work continued in the following years, led by Conrad Janninck among others.

== Suppression and relocation (18th century) ==
By the time the Society of Jesus was suppressed by Pope Clement XIV in 1773, the Bollandists had produced 50 volumes in 130 years. They had also moved from Antwerp to Brussels, where they continued their work in the monastery of the Coudenberg until 1788, when the Bollandist Society was suppressed by the Austrian government of the Low Countries. Their library was acquired by the Premonstratensians of Tongerlo Abbey, who endeavored to carry on the work. The fifty-third volume was published by the abbot of Tongerloo in 1794. The 53 volumes of the first series covered the saints from January 1 to October 14. Four former Bollandists supervised the work.

== Refoundation ==
After the re-establishment of the Society of Jesus in Belgium, a new Society of Bollandists was formed in the second quarter of the nineteenth century under the patronage of the Belgian government. The first volume of the new series appeared in 1845. A collection of 61 volumes was published in Paris between 1863 and 1867. By the end of the 19th century the work was re-oriented, bringing it more in line with the new philological methods. In 1882, a quarterly review on critical hagiography was established under the title of Analecta Bollandiana, which still exists today and publishes supplements to the Acta.

The Bollandists' studies led to the texts of the Missale Romanum, the Liturgia Horarum and the Martyrologium referring to Mary of Magdala. These studies were positively cited in Pope Francis' elevation of the saint's feast day to the status of a liturgical Feast.

The Bollandist Society is the only institution dedicated exclusively to the critical study of hagiography. "There is a lot of 'fake news'" about saints, said Bollandist Marc Lindeijer, S.J. "We can spend a lifetime correcting Wikipedia". Nonetheless, legends of the saints provide important information for historians and linguistic scholars. Patrick J. Geary says that the tales serve as "a window into the world of people of that time and place".

In 2024, Pope Francis made an unprecedented visit to the Bollandist's Brussels Centre in Etterbeek, marking the first papal visit in the society's 400 year history.

As of 2025, the president of the society is Mark Rotsaert.

In January 2026, UNESCO formally presented its "Memory of the World" certificate to the Acta Sanctorum, making it only the 8th such recognition ever awarded to Belgium.

== In fiction ==
The Bollandist Society has an important role in The Deptford Trilogy by Canadian novelist Robertson Davies. The series' protagonist, though not a Catholic, takes a deep interest in saints and their lives, and his scholarly efforts are welcomed by the Bollandists.

== Notable Bollandists ==
- Jean Bolland (1596–1665)
- Godfrey Henschen (1601–1681)
- Jean Gamans (1606–1684)
- Daniel Papebroch (1628–1714)
- Peter van der Bosch (1686–1736)
- Charles De Smedt (1833–1911)
- Joseph Van den Gheyn (1854–1913)
- Hippolyte Delehaye (1859–1941)
- Paul Grosjean (1900–1964)

== See also ==
- List of Jesuit sites in Belgium
- Archdiocese of Mechelen–Brussels
- Bohuslav Balbín

== Bibliography ==
- De Smedt, Charles (1907), "The Bollandists", The Catholic Encyclopedia, vol. II, New York: Robert Appleton Co.
- Baynes, T. S., ed. (1878), "The Bollandist Fathers" , Encyclopædia Britannica, vol. 4 (9th ed.), New York: Charles Scribner's Sons, pp. 18–19
- Delehaye, Hippolyte (1911), "Bollandists" , in Chisholm, Hugh (ed.), Encyclopædia Britannica, vol. 4 (11th ed.), Cambridge University Press, pp. 177–178
