= Hippolyte Delehaye =

Belgian Jesuit hagiographic scholar

Hippolyte Delehaye SJ
- President of the Society of Bollandists
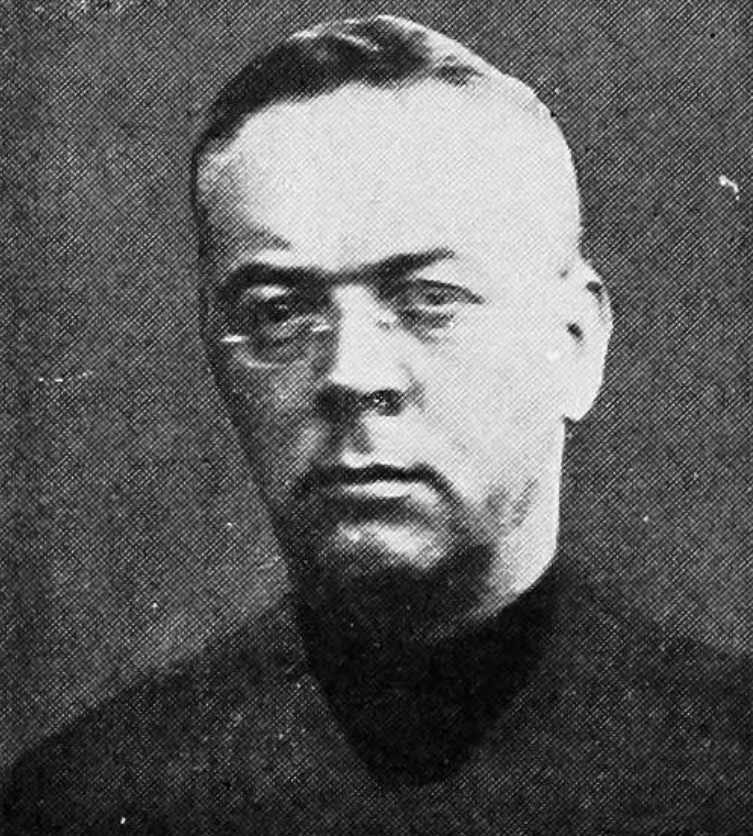
- Church: Catholic Church

Orders
- Ordination: 1890

Personal details
- Born: 19 August 1859 Antwerp, Belgium
- Died: 1 April 1941 (aged 81) Etterbeek, Belgium
- Occupation: Scholar
- Education: University of Louvain

Hippolyte Delehaye, SJ (19 August 1859 – 1 April 1941) was a Belgian Jesuit who was a hagiographical scholar and an outstanding member of the Society of Bollandists.

== Biography ==
Born in 1859 in Antwerp, Delehaye joined the Society of Jesus in 1876, being received into the novitiate the following year. After making his initial profession of religious vows in 1879, he was sent to study philosophy at the University of Louvain from 1879 to 1882. He was then assigned until 1886 to teach mathematics at the Collège Sainte-Barbe in Ghent (named for the school in Paris, alma mater of Ignatius of Loyola). Delehaye was ordained in 1890.

In 1892 Fr Delehaye was appointed by his Jesuit superiors to be a fellow of the Society of Bollandists, named for the 17th-century hagiographical scholar Jean Bolland, S.J., and founded the early seventeenth century specifically to study hagiography, research towards the gathering and evaluation of historical documentary sources regarding the life and cult of Christian Saints. Delehaye soon displayed great competence in the field. He was an editor of the Bibliotheca Hagiographica Graeca (1895), a technical catalogue of Greek hagiographical writings, and of the journal Analecta Bollandiana. In 1912 he became the president of the Society.

In the earlier part of the twentieth century fears arose in the Catholic Church about the theological consequences of some methods used in critical historical studies, including biblical scholarship. Later the Church accepted the principle of critical methodology, and in 1930 Pope Pius XI, himself a historical scholar, established a special historical section operating on similar lines, within the Sacred Congregation of Rites. However, at an earlier juncture suspicion fell for a time on a wide variety of Catholic scholarly institutes, including the Bollandists, whose purpose was to establish scholarly editions of hagiographical texts that were based on applying the critical method of sound documentary scholarship. These concerns about theological deviations generally referred to as Modernism prompted the 1907 encyclical Pascendi dominici gregis, in which St. Pius X condemned them.

As a consequence, in those years critical method encountered difficulties, within the Jesuit Order, within the Holy Office and among "integrist" opponents of critical approaches. As part of the controls put in place by the Catholic authorities, the Bollandists' scholarly journal Analecta Bollandiana, was subject to censorship by the Holy Office during the years 1901–1927.

These were issues of broader scope that did not prevent Fr Delehaye from continuing as a priest in good standing to pursue his researches with the Bollandists for the greater part of his long life and maintaining his international reputation as a respected and able scholar. He was a member of the Austrian Archaeological Institute, and named Knight of the Order of Leopold. Delehaye wrote a number of articles for the Catholic Encyclopedia.

Delehaye died on the first of April 1941 in Belgium.

== Books ==
Delehaye's major publications, works of method and synthesis that are of general use to historians, are:

- Les Légendes hagiographiques, Brüssels 1905, 1906 (translated by Virginia Mary Crawford, 1907, reprinted 1998), 1927. A 1955 French edition was translated by Donald Attwater as The Legends of the Saints (Fordham University Press, 1962).
- Les Origines du culte des martyrs, 1912
- Les Passions des martyrs et les genres littéraires, 1921
- Sanctus. Essai sur le culte des saints dans l'antiquité, 1927

Other important works, with more restricted focus, are:

- Synaxarium Ecclesiae Constantinopolitanae (Propylaeum ad Acta SS. Novembris), 1902
- Les versions grecques des Actes des martyrs persans sous Sapor II, 1905
- Les Légendes grecques des saints militaires, 1909
- A travers trois siècles: L'Oeuvre des Bollandistes 1615 à 1915, 1920 (translated in 1922)
- Les saints Stylites, 1923
- Martyrologium Romanum ... (Propylaeum ad Acta SS. Decembris), 194 A commentary on the Roman martyrology, of which Delehaye was the chief editor.
- Cinq leçons sur la méthode hagiographique, 1934.

Posthumous collections of fugitive pieces were published in 1966 as Mélanges d'hagiographie grecque et latine and in 1991 as L'ancienne hagiographie byzantine: les sources, les premiers modèles, la formation des genres, the previously unpublished texts of lectures delivered in 1935.
