= Acta Sanctorum =

Encyclopedic text examining the lives of Christian saints

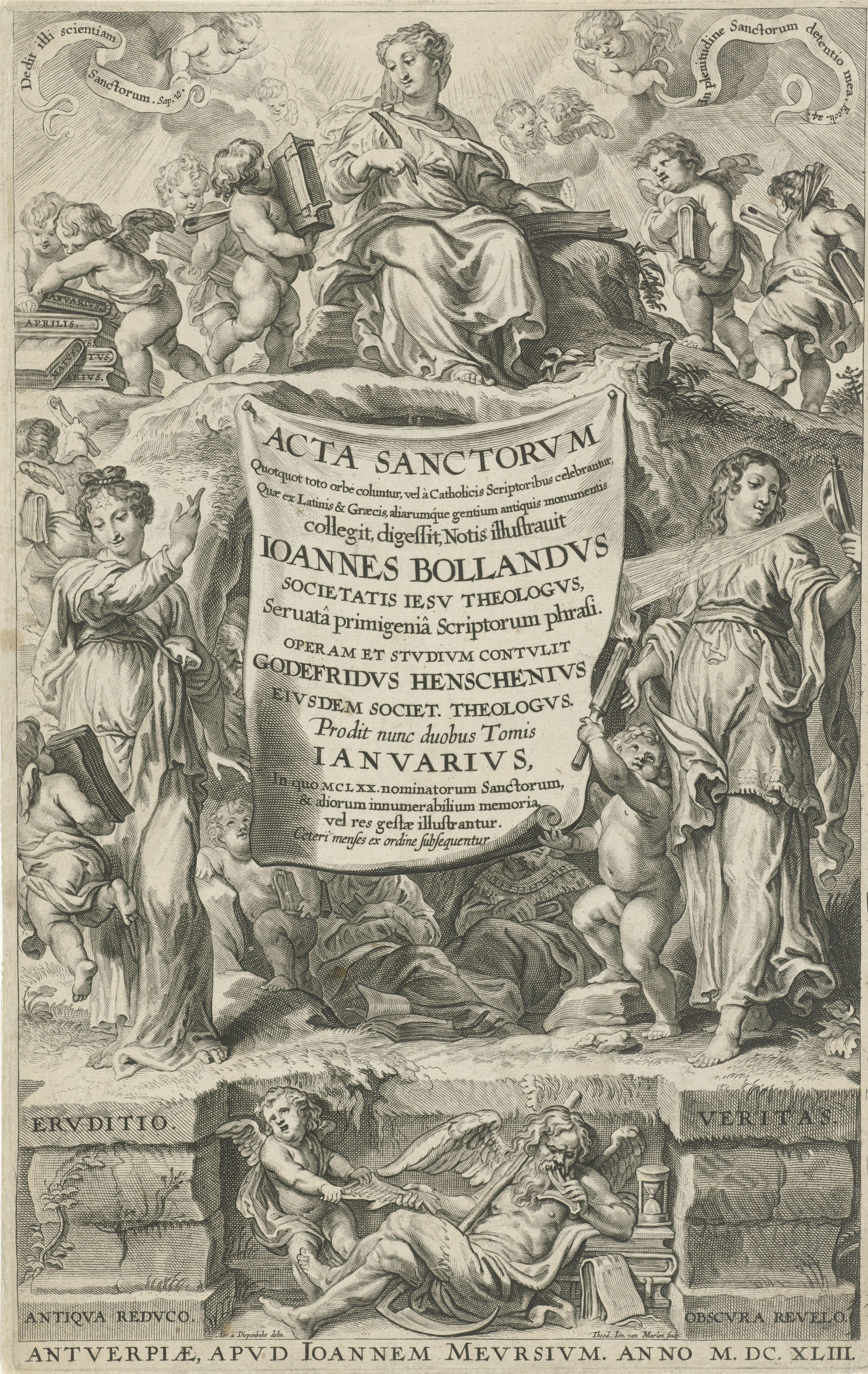
- Acta Sanctorum, January volume, published in 1643
- Author: Society of Bollandists
- Genre: Hagiography
- Published: 1643-1940
- No. of books: 68 volumes

Acta Sanctorum (Acts of the Saints; abbr. AASS) is an encyclopedic text in 68 folio volumes of documents examining the lives of Christian saints, in essence a critical hagiography, organised by the saints' feast days. The project was conceived and begun by the Jesuit Heribert Rosweyde. After his death in 1629, the Jesuit scholar Jean Bolland ('Bollandus', 1596–1665) continued the work, which was gradually finished over the centuries by the Bollandists, who continue to edit and publish the Acta Sanctorum.

The Bollandists oversaw the project, first in Antwerp and then in Brussels. The Acta Sanctorum began with two January volumes (for saints whose feast days were in January), published in 1643. From 1643 to 1794, 53 folio volumes of Acta Sanctorum were published, covering the saints from 1 January to 14 October. From 1695 to 1715, the March and April volumes were officially placed on the Index Librorum Prohibitorum in Spain.

When the Jesuits were suppressed by the Habsburg governor of the Low Countries in 1788, the work continued at Tongerlo Abbey. After the creation of the Kingdom of Belgium, the Bollandists were permitted to reassemble, working from the Royal Library of Belgium in Brussels. The main work ended with the Propylaeum to December published in 1940.

In total, the effort produced 68 volumes.

In addition to the extraordinary amount of biographical material, extensively researched, the Acta Sanctorum broke new ground in its use of historical criticism.

== See also ==
- Acta Martyrum
- Martyrologium romanum
- Roman Catholic calendar
