= Cyril of Constantinople =

Saint Cyril of Constantinople OCarm
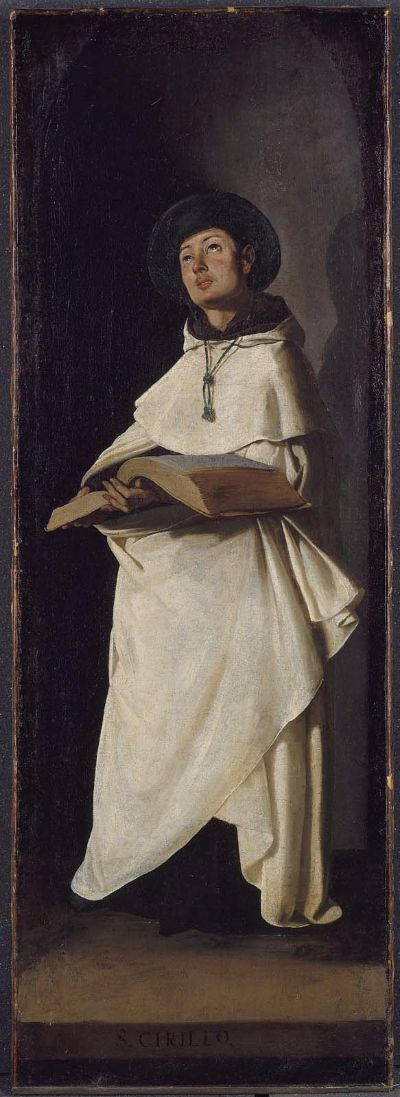
- Born: Constantinople
- Venerated in: Roman Catholic Church
- Attributes: Carmelite habit

Cyril of Constantinople (d. c. 1235) was reputed to have been a Prior General of the Order of Carmelites and prior of the hermits on Mount Carmel for three years. He is said to have had the gift of prophecy.

== Life ==
Cyril was born in Constantinople around 1126, and reputed to have become a priest and hermit on Mount Carmel. One of the pseudo-prophecies, given out towards the end of the thirteenth century by the Franciscan Spirituals, and attributed to Cyril of Jerusalem, became known to Guido de Perpignan and other Carmelites at Paris, who ascribed it to their former general, now considered a saint and a Doctor of the Church, his feast day being introduced in 1399.

In the breviary lessons he was also confused with Cyril of Alexandria. When the mistake was discovered (1430, but the confusion was maintained in the Venice Breviary, 1542), his title of a Doctor of the Church was justified by attributing to him a work, of which no trace exists, on the procession of the Holy Spirit. The so-called "Cyrillic prophecy" or angelic oracle Divinum oraculum S. Cyrillo Carmelitae Constantinopolitano solemni legatione angeli missum, so called because it is supposed to have been brought by an angel while Cyril was saying Mass, is a lengthy document of eleven chapters in incomprehensible language, with a commentary falsely ascribed to Abbot Joachim. It is first mentioned by Arnold of Villanova, c. 1295; Telesphorus of Cosenza applied it to the Western Schism and treated it as an utterance of the Holy Ghost.

Another writing erroneously attributed to Cyril is De processu sui Ordinis, by a contemporary, probably a French author; edited by Daniel a Virgine Mariâ in Speculum Carmelitarum.

== See also ==
- Book of the First Monks

| Preceded by Saint Brocard | Prior General of the Order of Carmelites; 1232–1237 | Succeeded by Berthold |
