= National Shrine of Saint Jude (England) =

National Shrine of Saint Jude, Faversham
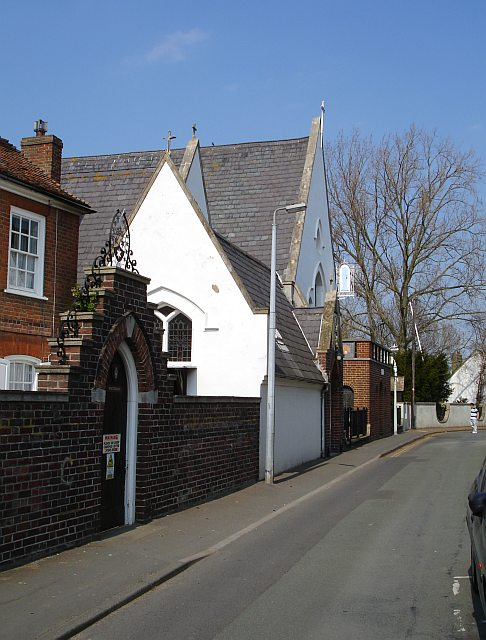
- Tanners Street
- National Shrine of Saint Jude, Faversham
- 51°18′55″N 0°53′03″E
- Location: Faversham, Kent
- Country: United Kingdom
- Denomination: Roman Catholic
- Website: http://www.stjudeshrine.org.uk

History
- Status: Active
- Founded: 1955
- Founder(s): Fr Elias Lynch, O.Carm
- Dedication: Saint Jude
- Dedicated: 28 October 1955

Architecture
- Style: Post War/Modern

Administration
- Archdiocese: Southwark
- Deanery: Canterbury
- Parish: Our Lady of Mount Carmel

The National Shrine of Saint Jude, adjoining the Roman Catholic parish Church of Our Lady of Mount Carmel in Faversham, Kent, England, is a shrine to Saint Jude and a place of pilgrimage and prayer for Catholics and other Christians since it was officially opened in 1955. It comes under the Roman Catholic Archdiocese of Southwark. It is located on Tanners Street, to the west of the town centre. The shrine was founded by the Order of Carmelites and it lies within the Faversham Conservation Area.

== History ==
The oldest building on the parish site, is the 18th century mansion built for a local tanner. Since 1936 it is known as "Whitefriars" or the priest's house, and houses the Carmelite community. It is next to the church and the shrine, and is a Grade II listed building. The church building dates from 1861. It was originally a school room for the Quaker daughters of the workers at the local gunpowder factories - it is still possible to see markings on the wall from where the children sharpened their slate pencils. In 1907, the school closed. In 1910, the building was bought by East Kent Cinemas and it became The Empire Picture Hall. In 1936, the cinema closed and the Carmelites bought it and by 1937, it was converted into a church. The original church on Plantation Lane had to be closed.

=== Construction of shrine ===
In 1955, the shrine of Saint Jude was built on a plot alongside the church. The building housing the shrine was specifically constructed as a site of pilgrimage. On 28 October 1955, the shrine was dedicated. The Bishop of Southwark Cyril Cowderoy, with the Prior General of the Carmelite Order, the Prior of Aylesford, performed the dedication in the presence of many other priests and friars. Bishop Cyril described the place as "a jewel for the diocese".

=== Interior ===
The corridor between the church and shrine has a number of stained glass windows by the artist Richard Joseph King, depicting important figures in the tradition of the Carmelite Order. There is the window of Saint Simon Stock, a Kentish man who became Prior General of the Order in the 1250s and who died in Bordeaux, France, in 1265. The other windows are of Saint Brocard, the prophet Elisha and the prophet Elijah.

The statue of the Apostle Jude in the inner shrine beyond the Shrine Chapel. It is fifteenth-century gilt and polychrome wood, and was a gift from Mr & Mrs Murphy, given in memory of their sons Matthew and Michael both of whom died in action in the Second World War.

The Shrine, the mosaic apse, ironwork and exterior frieze in mosaic were designed by Michael Leigh A.R.C.A., who worked on various churches and some of the mosaics in Westminster Cathedral.

The reliquary which stands in the inner shrine is called the Augsberg Reliquary, and is a modern copy of a silver monstrance from 1547. The reliquary has been modified to display the relic, a bone fragment of Saint Jude. There are three designs from the artist Adam Kossowski: holy water stoops at the entrance, and three ceramic plaques. There are icons are of Saint Albert giving the Carmelite 'way of life' (Rule document) to Saint Brocard on Mount Carmel; Blessed John Soreth and Blessed Françoise d'Amboise; Saint Elias Kuriakos Chavara and Blessed Isidore Bakanja Blessed Titus Brandsma and Saint Edith Stein.

=== Fire ===
In 2004 a fire broke out in the shrine chapel, destroying the murals and damaging much of the other artwork. The windows and ceramics could be repaired, but the murals had to be replaced. The decision was made to install icons depicting saints inspired by the Carmelite Rule of Saint Albert, in commemoration of the 8th centenary of the Carmelite Rule in 2007. The icons were written by Sister Petra Clare, a Benedictine hermit living in Scotland.

== Activities ==
The Society of the Infant Jesus is affiliated to the Shrine of the Infant Jesus cared for by the Discalced Carmelite brothers in Prague, where the original statue of Jesus has been revered since the 17th century.

In 2014, the Guild of Saint Jude was founded. It was set up to foster worship, for members to be able to support and share in the mission of the Carmelite Family by prayer and material resources; and to raise awareness and encourage pilgrimages to the National Shrine.

In 2020, the British Pilgrimage Trust opined in their publication that the Faversham Shrine was a common meeting ground between Anglicans and Catholics and that Jude was "a more productive figure to contemplate than the Reformation martyrs of either side", and for that reason the Shrine deserved the "highest recommendation".

During the pandemic of 2020/21, the Shrine of Saint Jude offered a number of online initiatives including 'Praying with Saint Jude at home' and the Virtual Feast of Saint Jude, with the participation of Carmelite friars, lay people and other people associated with the Shrine.

Two annual events occur at the Shrine in May and in October on the feast of St. Jude.

Statue of the Infant of Prague

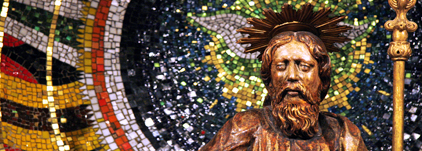
Statue of St Jude

St Simon Stock
