= 1518 in poetry =

Nationality words link to articles with information on the nation's poetry or literature (for instance, Irish or France).

== Events ==
- Baptista Mantuanus' Eclogues prescribed for use in St Paul's School (London).

== Works published ==
=== Great Britain ===
- Anonymous, Cock Laurel's Boat, publication year uncertain; Cock Lorell led a gang of thieves in the early 16th century
- Alexander Barclay, Fifth Eclogue (see also Eclogues 1530, The Boke of Codrus and Mynalcas 1521
- Sir Thomas More, Epigrammata

== Births ==
Death years link to the corresponding "[year] in poetry" article:

- Francesco Uberti (humanist) (born 1440), Italian, Latin-language poet

== Deaths ==
Birth years link to the corresponding "[year] in poetry" article:

- Kabir, some dispute with his years of birth and death (born 1398 or 1440), mystic composer and saint of India, whose literature has greatly influenced the Bhakti movement of India

== See also ==
- Poetry
- 16th century in poetry
- 16th century in literature
- French Renaissance literature
- Grands Rhétoriqueurs
- Renaissance literature
- Spanish Renaissance literature
