= Prior General of the Order of Carmelites =

List of Carmelite Prior-Generals

Prior General of Order of Brothers of The Blessed Virgin Mary of Mount Carmel
- Prior Generalis Ordinis Fratrum Beatae Mariae Virginis de Monte Carmelo
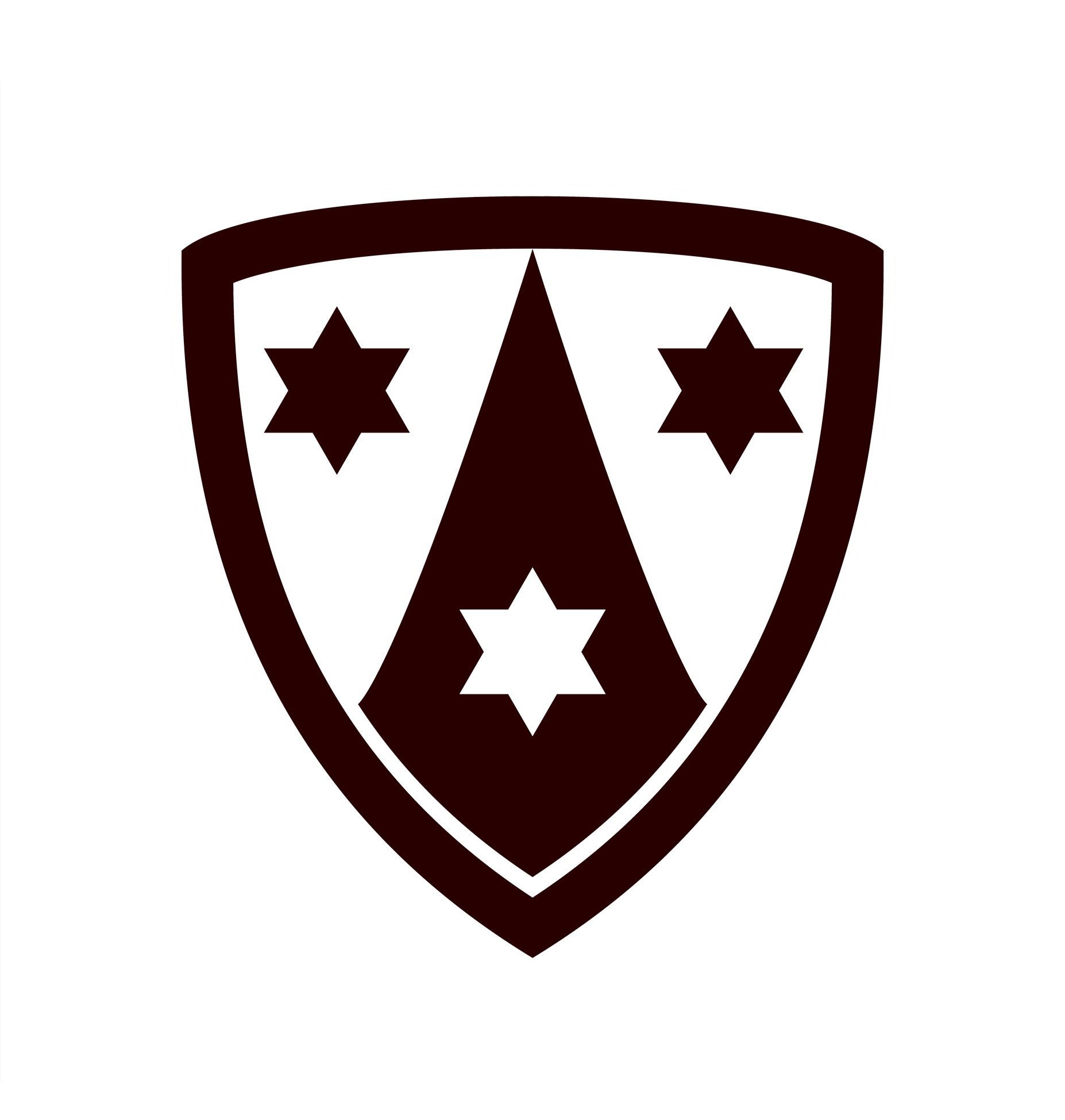
- Escutcheons of the Carmelites.
- Incumbent; Mícéal O'Neill
- Type: Religious order head
- First holder: Berthold of Calabria

The Prior General of the Order of Carmelites is the Superior General of the Order of the Brothers of the Blessed Virgin Mary of Mount Carmel, commonly known as the Carmelites.

== Prior General of the Order ==
No.	Image	Prior General	Nationality	Tenure	Notes
		Berthold of Calabria	Limoges, France	1154-1195	Accepted as leader of the hermits by Brocard
1		Saint Brocard		1200 – 1232	
2		Cyril of Constantinople		1232 – 1237	
3		Berthold		1237 – 1249	
4		Gottfried		1249 – 1253	
5		Alain		1253 – 1254	
6		Saint Simon Stock	Aylesford, England	1254 – 1265	The Virgin Mary appeared to him holding the brown scapular in one hand. Her words were: "Receive, my beloved son, this scapular of thy Order; it is the special sign of my favor, which I have obtained for thee and for thy children of Mount Carmel. He who dies clothed with this habit shall be preserved from eternal fire. It is the badge of salvation, a shield in time of danger, and a pledge of special peace and protection."
7		Nicolas Le Françoi		1266 – 1271	
8		Radulphe		1271 – 1277	
9		Pierre de Millaud		1277 – 1294	
10		Raymond de L’Isle		1294 – 1297	
11		Gerard of Bologna		1297 – 1318	theologian and scholastic philosopher
12		Guy Terreni		1318 – 1321	canon lawyer and scholastic philosopher. Consecrated Bishop of Mallorca, and Elna
13		Giovanni d’Alerio		1321 – 1330	
14		Pierre de Casa	Limoges, France	1330 – 1342	Became Bishop of the Diocese of Vaison (1341-1348) and Latin Patriarch of Jerusalem (1342-1348)
15		Pierre-Raymond de Grasse		1342 – 1358	
16		Joan Ballester		1358 – 1375	
17		Bernat Oller		1375 – 1381	
18		Bernat Oller		1381 – 1384	Uncanonical
19		Michele Aignani		1381 – 1386	
20		Raymond de Vaquerie		1384 – 1389	Uncanonical
21		Jean de Raude		1386 – 1404	
22		Jean Le Gros		1389 – 1411	Uncanonical
23		Matteo de Bologne		1404 – 1411	
24		Jean Le Gros		1411 – 1430	
25		Bartolomeo Roquali		1430 – 1433	
26		Natale Bencesi		1433 – 1434	Became Bishop of the Titular Diocese of Nona
27		Giovanni Faci		1434 – 1450	
28		Blessed John Soreth	Kingdom of France	1451–1471	He establish the Carmelite nuns, especially following the papal bull "Cum Nulla" of Nicholas V issued in 1452
29		Cristoforo Martignoni		1471 – 1481	
30		Guillaume de Domoquercy		1481 – 1503	
31		Pons de Raynaud		1503 – 1512	
32		Pierre Terrasse		1512 – 1513	
33		Blessed Johannes Baptista Spagnolo	Duchy of Mantua	1513–1516	
34		Giovanni Batista de Parme		1516 – 1517	
35		Bernardino Landucci		1517 – 1523	
36		Nicolas Audet		1523 – 1562	
37		Giovanni Batista Rossi		1562–1578	
38		Giovanni Batista Caffardi		1578 – 1592	
39		Giovanni Stefano Chizzola		1592 – 1596	
40		Henry Sylvio	Kingdom of France	1598 – 1612	
41		Sebastiano Fantoni		1612 – 1623	
42		Gregorio Canali		1623 – 1631	His main work was the publication of the Carmelite constitutions of 1626, which remained valid until the beginning of the 20th century
43		Teodoro Straccio		1631 – 1642	
44		Alberto Massari		1642 – 1643	
45		Leone Bonfigli		1643 – 1647	
46		Giovanni Antonio Filippini		1648 – 1654	
47		Mario Venturini		1654 – 1660	
48		Girolamo Ari		1660 – 1666	
49		Matteo Orlandi		1666 – 1674	
50		Francesco Scannapieco		1674 – 1676	
51		Ferdinando Tartaglia		1680 – 1682	
52		Angelo Monsignani		1682 – 1686	
53		Paolo di Sant’Ignazio		1686 – 1692	
54		Juan Feyjóo González de Villalobos	Spanish Empire	1644–1649	Became Bishop of the Diocese of Guadix-Baza (1702-1706)
55		Carlo Filiberto Berberi		1698 – 1704	
56		Angelo de Cambolas		1704 – 1710	
57		Pedro Tomás Sanchez		1710 – 1716	
58		Carlo Cornaccioli		1716 – 1721	Became Bishop of the Roman Catholic Diocese of Bobbio (1726-1737)
59		Gaspare Pizzolanti		1721–1725	Became Bishop of the Roman Catholic Diocese of Cervia (1727-1765)
60		Antoine-Joseph-Aimable Feydeau	Kingdom of France	1728 – 1730	He was ordained Bishop of the Roman Catholic Diocese of Digne (1730–1741))
61		Ludovico Benzoni		1731 – 1738	
62		Nicola Ricchiuti		1738 – 1742	
63		Luigi Laghi		1742 – 1756	
64		Gioacchino Maria Pontalti		1756 – 1761	Consecrated Bishop and became Titular Bishop of Ascalon
65		Mariano Ventimiglia		1762 – 1768	
66		José Alberto Ximenez		1768 – 1780	
67		Andrea Andras		1780 – 1788	
68		Giovanni Tufano		1788 – 1790	
69		Rocco Melchor		1794 – 1805	
70		Timoteo Maria Ascensi		1807 – 1814	
71		Luigi Antonio Faro		1819 – 1825	
72		Manuel Regidor y Brihuega		1825 – 1832	
73		Luigi Calamata		1832 – 1838	
74		Giuseppe Cataldi		1838 – 1841	
75		Giuseppe Palma		1841 – 1843.04.03	became Bishop of the Diocese of Avellino
76		Agostino Maria Ferrara		1843 – 1849	
77		Giuseppe Raimondo Lobina		1849 – 1854	
78		Girolamo Priori		1854 – 1863	
79		Elijah Magennis		1919 – 1931	
80		Hilary Doswold		1947 – 1959	
81		Kilian Lynch		1947 – 1959	
82		Kilian Healy		1959 – 1971	
83		Falco Thuis		1971– 1983	
84		John Malley		1971 – 1983	
85		Joseph Chalmers	Scottish	1995 – 2007	
86		Fernando Millán Romeral	Spanish	2007 – 2019	
87		Míċéal O’Neill	Irish	2019 – 2025	
88		Desiderio García Martínez	Spanish	2025 - present	
