= Elias Lynch =

Fr Elias Lynch (1897–1967) was an Irish Carmelite friar of the Carmelites of the Ancient Observance, and founder of the National Shrine of Saint Jude in England.

== Ireland ==
Elias was his religious name as he was baptised as "Murtagh" in a family of eleven other children. Elias later described himself as a child of the "soil", and was born in the farming community of Wicklow, Ireland.

== England ==
=== Sittingbourne, Kent ===
In 1931, the Chapter of the Irish Carmelites asked Elias to go to Sittingbourne in Kent to take over the Carmelite mission. The Catholic community was growing and the church was near a convent with a busy school. Unfortunately his time did not end well here. Elias had decided to set up a social club in Sittingbourne in the hope that he could draw in donations for the parish funds. However events beyond his control ended this venture and even the 'News of the World' highlighted that a priest was running the 'Whitefriars Arms'. The Bishop of Southwark was not happy that a priest looked like he was running a pub, and moved Elias to Faversham with other Carmelites taking over Sittingbourne.

=== Faversham, Kent ===
In Faversham, Elias set up the Carmelite Press in 1938. The Press would print materials sent out to clients who, by their donations, supported the work of the Carmelite friars. This new press also began to print a newsletter, 'Carmelite News', which raised money from the supporters of the friars in touch. 'The Carmelite News' became an important communication link between the Order in Britain and its supporters. This is how he eventually set up the National Shrine of Saint Jude.

== Death ==
Within only a few days of his seventieth birthday, Fr. Elias died in the Cottage hospital in Faversham on 1 November 1967. He is buried in the Aylesford Priory Carmelite cemetery.
