= Pierre de Casa =

His Beatitude Pierre de Casa O.Carm
- Titular Latin Patriarch of Jerusalem
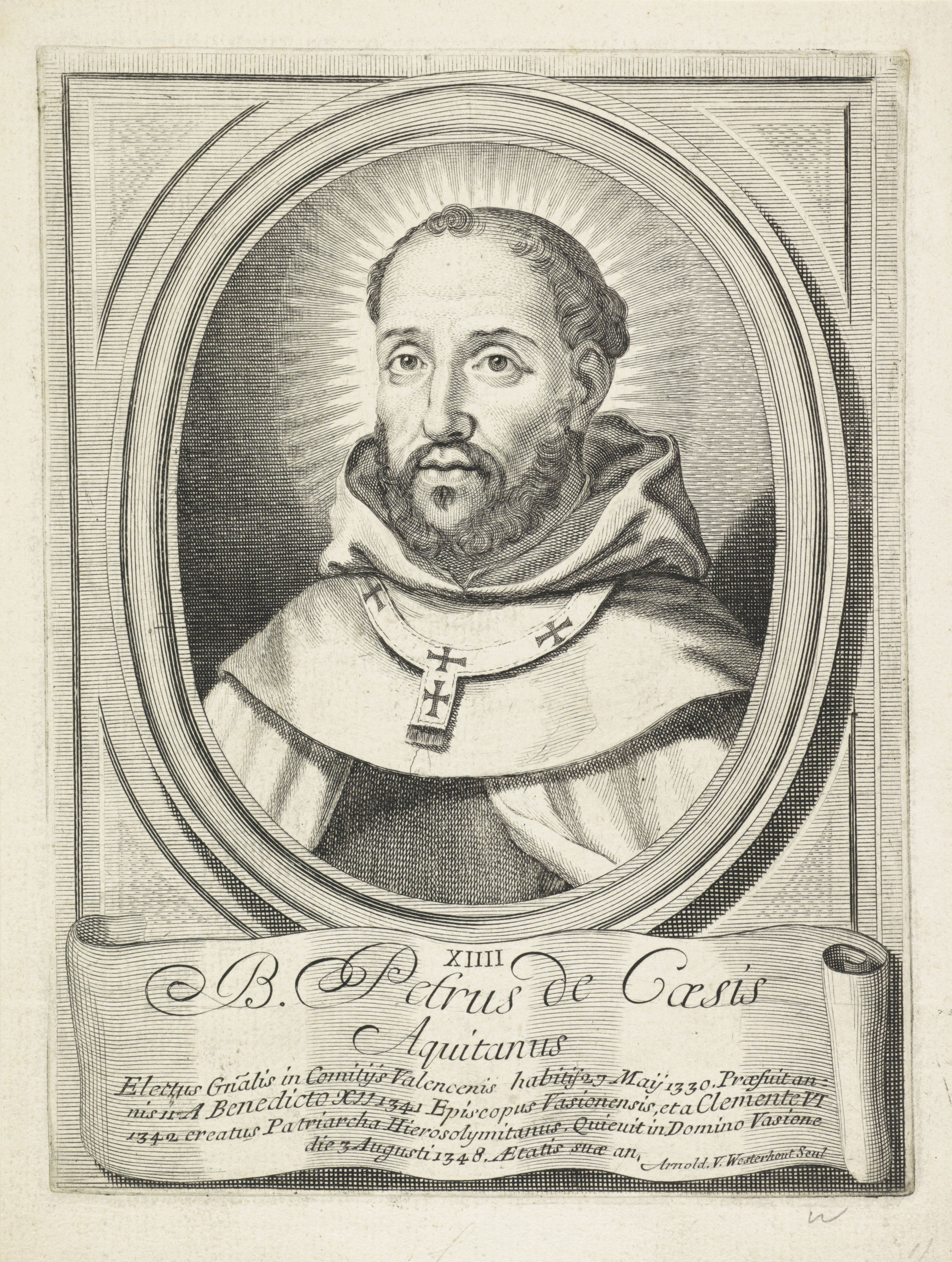
- Archdiocese: Jerusalem
- Province: Jerusalem
- See: Jerusalem
- Installed: 1345
- Term ended: 3 August 1348

Personal details
- Born: 1348 Limoges
- Died: Unknown
- Denomination: Roman Catholic

Styles of Patriarch Pierre de Casa
- Reference style: His Beatitude
- Spoken style: Your Beatitude
- Religious style: Monsignor
- Posthumous style: n/a

Pierre de Casa, prior general of Carmelite Order, bishop of Vaison-la-Romaine and Latin Patriarch of Jerusalem

== Biography ==
=== The fourteenth prior general of the Carmelites ===
Pierre de Casa took the Carmelite habit at the convent of Limoges, his birthplace. He then taught philosophy and theology there. But it was above all his talents as a speaker that impressed his contemporaries. Considered one of the greatest preachers of his order, during the general chapter of Barcelona, in 1324, this bachelor in theology was elected provincial of Aquitaine. In 1330, the general chapter of Valenciennes appointed him as the fourteenth prior general of his Order.

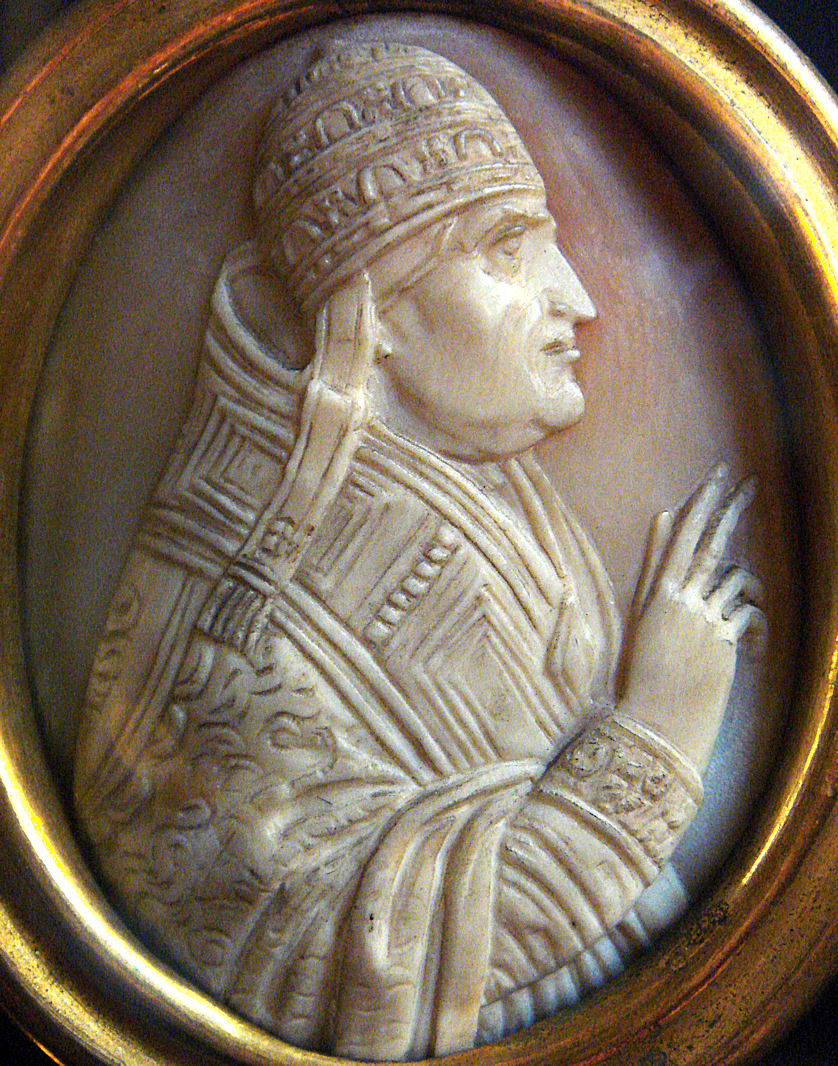
John XXII (cameo)

=== The condemnation of the beatific vision of John XXII ===
Having attained the rank of doctor in Sorbonne, Pierre de Casa was brought - an extremely rare event - to condemn the pope during an assembly convened by the king Philippe VI of France at château de Vincennes. This renowned theologian, meditating day and night on the law of the Lord , and his colleagues at the University of Paris, conformists guardians of dogma, could not accept the very unorthodox thesis of John XXII on the ' 'beatific vision'.

It immediately became the gospel of the day and there was an uplift in the Church which no longer knew which way to turn. Pierre Roger, future Clément VI, then archbishop of Rouen, was immediately dispatched to Avignon by Philippe VI of Valois where he arrived at the end of February 1332. A fine diplomat, he managed to preach to the Pope without lecturing him too much. Everyone liked it.

=== The College of Carmelites in Paris ===
The College of the Order, housed in the "Maison du Lion", rue Sainte-Geneviève, trained renowned theologians and canonists. The new convent on Place Maubert had become the large general studium where students from other provinces stayed. Its chapel was consecrated on 16 March 1333, in the presence of Pierre de Casa and Jeanne d'Évreux, widow of Charles IV, benefactress of the Carmelite Order. The prior general, trained at this school, left three works "Super sentencias", "Super politica Aristoteles" and "Sermones de tempre, de Beata Virgine et de sanctis" that Father Vitrac, in 1779, considered to be "very learned for their time".

=== Bishop of Vaison ===
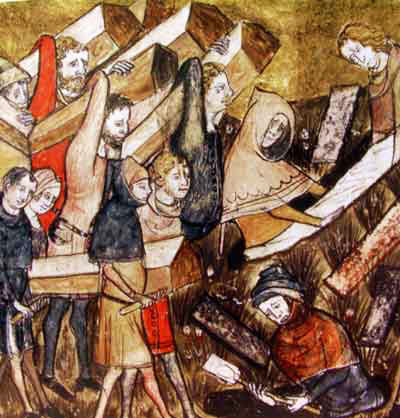
Victims of the plague, "Chronicle" by Gilles Li Muisis. Royal Library of Belgium, MS 13076-77, f. 24v.

In 1339, Pierre de Casa returned to Limoges to preside over a new chapter in which fifteen provincials and two provincial vicars participated. The prior general was reappointed. Benoît XII, who had condemned the “beatific vision” of his predecessor as soon as he was elected, wanted to have him with him and appointed him in 1341 bishop of Vaison-la-Romaine, seat left vacant by Rathier de Miremont. From then on, Pierre de Casa left his office to join Avignon and take possession of his bishopric.

=== Latin Patriarch of Jerusalem ===
A year later, on 7 May 1342, Pierre Roger was elected pope and took the name of Clement VI. The new Sovereign Pontiff, "who loved him, knew his scholarship and revered his virtues," elevated his compatriot to the Patriarchate of Jerusalem in 1345 Pierre de Casa succeeded Elijah of Nabinal. This prelate, originally from Périgord, had been appointed archbishop of Nicosia in 1332, then patriarch of Jerusalem and cardinal in 1342. After a short interim by Emanuele Marino in 1345, the Bishop of Vaison acceded to the patriarchate.

A great ecclesiastical career was opening up before this prelate and no one doubted that the Carmelite of Limoges would be in the next cardinal promotion. But Pierre de Casa was a victim of the Black Plague. He died on 3 August 1348 after testing on 1 July that year. He bequeathed his rich library to five Carmelite convents, made donations to those of Limoges and Pernes-les-Fontaines, as for his nephew, Denis de Mazerolles, he was granted 150 florins to continue his studies.

The historical tradition places his tomb in the apse of the Notre-Dame de Nazareth cathedral in Vaison.

== Bibliography ==
- Louis Anselme Boyer, "History of the Cathedral Church of Vaison", Avignon, 1731.
- Auguste du Boys and Abbé Arbelot, "Biography of illustrious men of the former province of Limousin", Limoges, 1854.

== See also ==
- List of bishops of Vaison

== Notes and references ==
Catholic Church titles
Preceded by Antony Bek	Latin Patriarch of Jerusalem; 1314–1318	Succeeded by Raymond Bequin

Preceded by Giovanni d’Alerio	Prior General of the Order of Carmelites; 1330–1342	Succeeded by Pierre-Raymond de Grasse
