= Carmelite Martyrs of Guadalajara =

- Died: 24 July 1936, Spain
- Martyred by: Republican regime
- Means of martyrdom: gunshot
- Venerated in: Roman Catholic Church
- Beatified: 29 March 1987, by Pope John Paul II
- Major shrine: Guadalajara, Spain
- Feast: 24 July
- Notable martyrs: María Pilar de San Francisco de Borja, María Ángeles de San José, and Teresa del Niño Jesús y de San Juan de la Cruz

The Carmelite martyrs of Guadalajara were three Spanish Carmelites, María Pilar de San Francisco de Borja, María Ángeles de San José and Teresa del Niño Jesús y de San Juan de la Cruz killed by Republican forces on 24 July 1936 during the Spanish Civil War.

They were beatified on 29 March 1987 by Pope John Paul II. Their feast day is 24 on July.

== Martyrdom ==
When the Civil War broke out in 1936, there was widespread persecution of religious. On July 22, 1936, as Republican militias seized the city of Guadalajara, the nuns of the Carmelite convent feared it would be burned down. That afternoon, the priest bestowed the Holy Communion to the 18 nuns, and then they all left for the city to seek refuge in nearby houses or with acquaintances.

The three nuns spent their first night with the prioress and a sister suffering from heart problems who had recently had a minor heart attack, in the basement of a hotel. The next morning at 5 a.m., they recited the Liturgy of the hours. Later, twelve sisters were then gathered in the hotel, but seeing private homes constantly under attack, their anxious hostess declared that she could only hide three of them. The prioress and the nurse moved to a house on the same street where two Carmelite friars had previously stayed. But this house only had room for two people. Sr. Thérèse of the Child Jesus then suggested to her fellow sisters Marie Pilar and Marie Ange that they follow her to another house, where some of her friends lived.

As they walked along the street, militiawoman incited her comrades to shoot the three nuns: Sr. Marie Ange was killed instantly, Sr. Marie Pilar, mortally wounded, was taken to the Red Cross hospital, where she died a few hours later, whispering, "Father, forgive them". Sr. Thérèse of the Child Jesus managed to escape, but she was caught by a militiaman named Palero, who initially claimed to want to protect her. Instead, he took her near the cemetery, where he ordered her to shout "Long live communism!", but the nun refused and instead cried out, "Long live Christ the King!". She was then shot against the cemetery wall. Other sources indicate that the nun was offered her freedom if she renounced Christ, the Church, and the Carmelite order. She reportedly refused and was killed.

Immediately afterward, the bodies of the three nuns were thrown into a mass grave. This was reopened on July 15, 1941. Their bodies were identified by their scapulars and crucifixes on their chests. The mortal remains of the three nuns were removed and buried in their monastery two days later. Miracles were soon reported and attributed to the intercession of the three nuns.

== Veneration ==
On March 29, 1987, Pope John Paul II beatified the three Carmelite nuns of Guadalajara in Rome. n March 11, 2001, during the beatification in Rome of 233 Spanish martyrs of the Civil War, Pope John Paul II declared of them, "All of them, before dying, as is evident from the canonical proceedings for their declaration as martyrs, wholeheartedly forgave their executioners".
