= John Soreth =

Prior General of the Carmelite Order

Blessed John Soreth OCarm
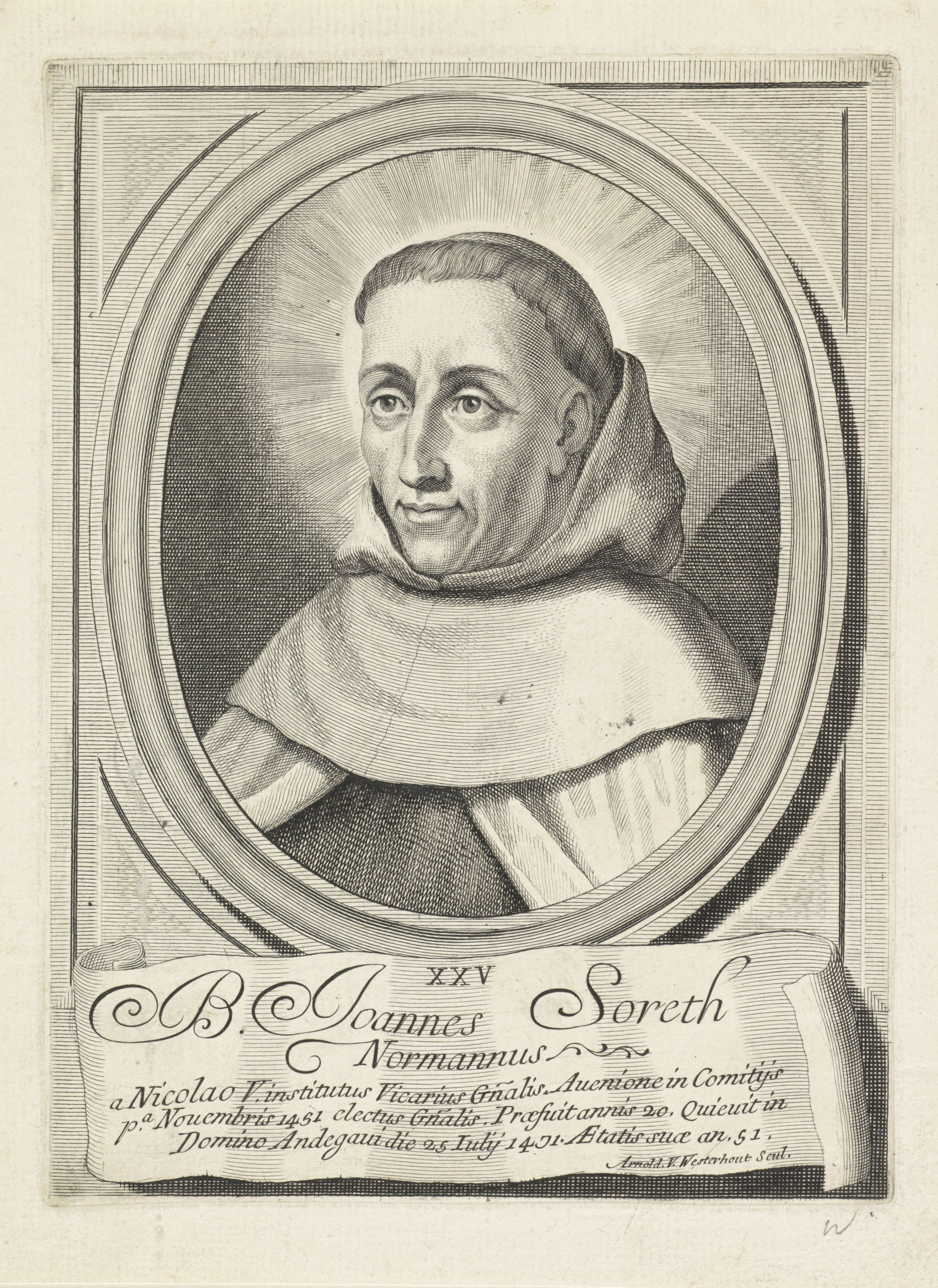
- Born: 1394; Caen, Kingdom of France
- Died: July 25, 1471; Angers, Kingdom of France
- Venerated in: Roman Catholic Church
- Beatified: 1866, Saint Peter's Basilica by Pope Pius IX
- Feast: November 4
- Attributes: Carmelite habit, ciborium

John Soreth, OCarm (1394 – 1471) was a French Catholic priest who served as prior general of the Carmelites from 1451 until his death.

== Biography ==
Soreth was born near Caen in Normandy, France in 1394 and entered the Carmelite house there. Ordained priest around 1417, he became a doctor of theology in Paris in 1438 and then regent of studies there. He was provincial of the French Province from 1440-1451 and prior general of the order from 1451 until his death.

Soreth was unflagging in his efforts at renewal, during what was an especially critical period for both the Church and the Order. He dedicated himself entirely to the reform of the Order, travelling across Europe, making canonical visitations and promoting a more faithful observance of religious life both in the older Provinces and convents and in the Mantuan Reformed Congregation.

Soreth wrote a commentary on the Rule, his Expositio paranetica, and published new revised Constitutions in 1462. Among his other activities was the encouragement and establishment of the Carmelite nuns, especially following the papal bull "Cum Nulla" of Nicholas V issued in 1452. In particular, he supported the foundations in Northern Europe made by Blessed Frances d'Amboise, whom he himself clothed in the Carmelite habit. In addition - as a result of the same papal bull - he was instrumental in the development of the Lay Carmelite Third Order.

Soreth died at Angers on 25 July 1471 and the Carmelite, Baptist Spagnoli, the famous humanist, wrote an elegy for him. He is called blessed and his cult was officially recognized by Pope Pius IX in 1866. His feast is celebrated on 24 July.

Preceded by Giovanni Faci	Prior General of the Order of Carmelites; 1451–1471	Succeeded by Cristoforo Martignoni
