= Telesphorus of Cosenza =

Telesphorus of Cosenza (or Theophorus, Theolophorus) was a name assumed by one of the pseudo-prophets during the time of the Western Schism. As an pseudonymous author of a Latin work Liber de magnis tribulationibus, the name was attached to a 1365 production of the Fraticelli. The Liber was updated (by 1386) to fit the situation in the Schism.

"Telesphorus" stated that he was born in Cosenza, Italy and lived as a hermit near the site of the ancient Thebes. His book of predictions on the Schism was the most popular of the prophetic treatises of the period. More than twenty manuscripts of it are extant, and it first appeared in print, with various interpolations, as Liber de magnis tribulationibus in proximo futuris (Venice, 1516).

== Liber de magnis tribulationibus ==
The work was compiled about 1386 from the writings of Joachim of Fiore, Jean de Roquetaillade, the Cyrillic Prophecy (of Cyril of Constantinople), and other apocalyptic treatises whose authors are mentioned in the dedicatory preface addressed to Antoniotto Adorno, the Doge of Genoa.

Its main prophecies are as follows:

1. The schism will end in 1393 at Perugia, where the antipope and his followers will be punished;
2. A short period of peace will follow, whereupon the Emperor Frederick III with three antipopes will inaugurate a cruel persecution of the clergy, who will be deprived of all their temporalities;
3. King Charles of France will be imprisoned, but miraculously liberated;
4. The "Angelic Pastor" will ascend the papal throne;
5. Under his pontificate, the clergy will voluntarily renounce their temporal possessions and a general council will legislate that the income of the clergy is limited to what is necessary for a decent livelihood;
6. The "Angelic Pastor" will take from the German electors the right to elect the Emperor, he will crown the French King Charles emperor, and restore the Church to its original poverty and service of God;
7. Finally, the Pope and the Emperor will undertake a crusade, regain the Holy Land, and bring the Jews, Greeks, and infidels back to Christ.

Part 6, the crowning of the French king, was a popular prophecy in its own right, and drew on an existing tradition of prophecy about a Second Charlemagne. Reeves suggests that the origin of the Telesphorus prophecy was the wish to put the Second Charlemagne in context for followers of Joachim of Fiore. In the 1380s the king of France was Charles VI, son of Charles V.

A criticism of these prophecies, written by the German theologian Henry of Langenstein, was printed in Bernhard Pez, Thesaurus Anecdotorum Noviss, I, II, (Augsburg, 1721-9), 507-64.
