= Guido Terrena =

Catalan Carmelite canon lawyer and scholastic philosopher

Guido Terrena (c.1260-1270 in Perpignan – August 21 1342 in Perpignan was a Catalan bishop, Carmelite canon lawyer and scholastic philosopher.

== Names ==
Terrena is known under several names: Guido Terrena as well as Guiu Terrena, Guido Terreni, Guiu Terré und Guy de Perpignan, Guido de Perpiniano, Guido Elnensis, Guido Maioricensis, "Doctor Breviloquus" or "Doctor Melifluus".

== Life ==
His birthdate is probably between 1260 and 1270. He was born in the french Perpignan.

Fictional portrait of Guido Terrena

He was a student of Godfrey of Fontaines and teacher of John Baconthorpe at the university of Paris as well as Avignon. He became Prior-General of the Carmelites in 1318, 1321 bishop of Mallorca, and 1332 bishop of Elna. As bishop of Elna he opposed Adhémar IV de Mosset.

He was strong proponent of Godfrey of Fontaines Interpretation of Aristotle.

He died on August 21 1342 in Perpignan and was buried there.

== Works ==
He was an early infallibilist; the concept of papal infallibility is thought to occur first in a work he wrote concerning the conflict of Pope John XXII (1316–34) and the Franciscan Spirituals. It is said that he adapted this doctrine to papal needs rather than originating it before 1328. His position on papal infallibility "so closely anticipated the doctrine of Vatican I that in the judgment of B.M. Xiberta, the Carmelite scholar who edited [Terreni's] work, 'if he had written it after Vatican I he would have to add or change hardly a single word.'" He wrote: "We are not asking whether a pope can be a heretic in himself but whether he can err in defining anything in the church and obliging the faithful to believe, so that his error does not concern the person of the pope alone but concerns all the faithful and the whole church of Christ. For an error concerning his person can inhere in the pope, but not an error concerning the whole church."

He was one of those opposing the views of Arnold of Villanova on the Antichrist; and he first dubbed Joachim of Fiore a heretic. He was asked, with Pierre de la Palud, to report on Peter John Olivi's apocalyptic writing.

He wrote commentaries on Aristotle's De anima, Nicomachean Ethics, Metaphysics, and Physics.

Other works include the Errores Sarracenorum against Islam, a Summa de haresibus and a Decretum commentary.
