= Berthold of Calabria =

French crusader (died 1195)

Saint Berthold of Mount Carmel
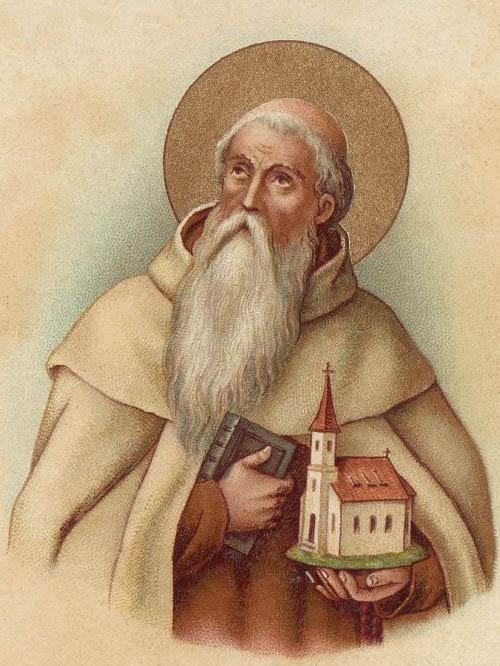
- Born: Limoges, France
- Died: 1195 AD
- Venerated in: Roman Catholic Church
- Feast: March 29

Berthold of Calabria (French: Berthold de Malifaye; Latin: Bertoldus Calabriensis; died 1195) was a crusader and saint who established a hermit colony on Mount Carmel in 1185. He was introduced into Carmelite literature around the 15th century as Saint Berthold of Mount Carmel and is said to have been a general of the Order before Brocard.

Berthold was a son of the Count of Limoges and was born in Malifaye in southwest France. The label "Calabrian" was a contemporary euphemism for "Westerner." Berthold was a nephew of Aymeric of Malifaye, the Latin patriarch of Antioch.

Berthold went to the Holy Land as part of the Crusades and was in Antioch when it was besieged by the Saracens. During this time he had a vision of Christ denouncing the soldiers' evil methods. At the time, hermits from the West were scattered throughout Palestine. Some accounts hold that in 1185 he came to Mount Carmel, built a small chapel there and gathered a community of hermits who would live at his side in imitation of the prophet Elijah. This community was believed to have given rise to the Order of the Carmelites, but this is not supported by evidence and is discounted by historians of the Order. Berthold lived out his days on Mount Carmel, ruling the community he had founded for forty-five years until his death in 1195.

Tradition holds that he was accepted as leader of the hermits by Brocard. His feast day is celebrated on March 29.

== See also ==
- Hermit
- Discalced Carmelites
- Carmelite Rule of St. Albert
- Book of the First Monks
- Constitutions of the Carmelite Order
- Dialogues of the Carmelites
