= Baptista Mantuanus =

Italian Carmelite reformer, humanist, and poet

Blessed Baptist Spagnoli of Mantua OCarm
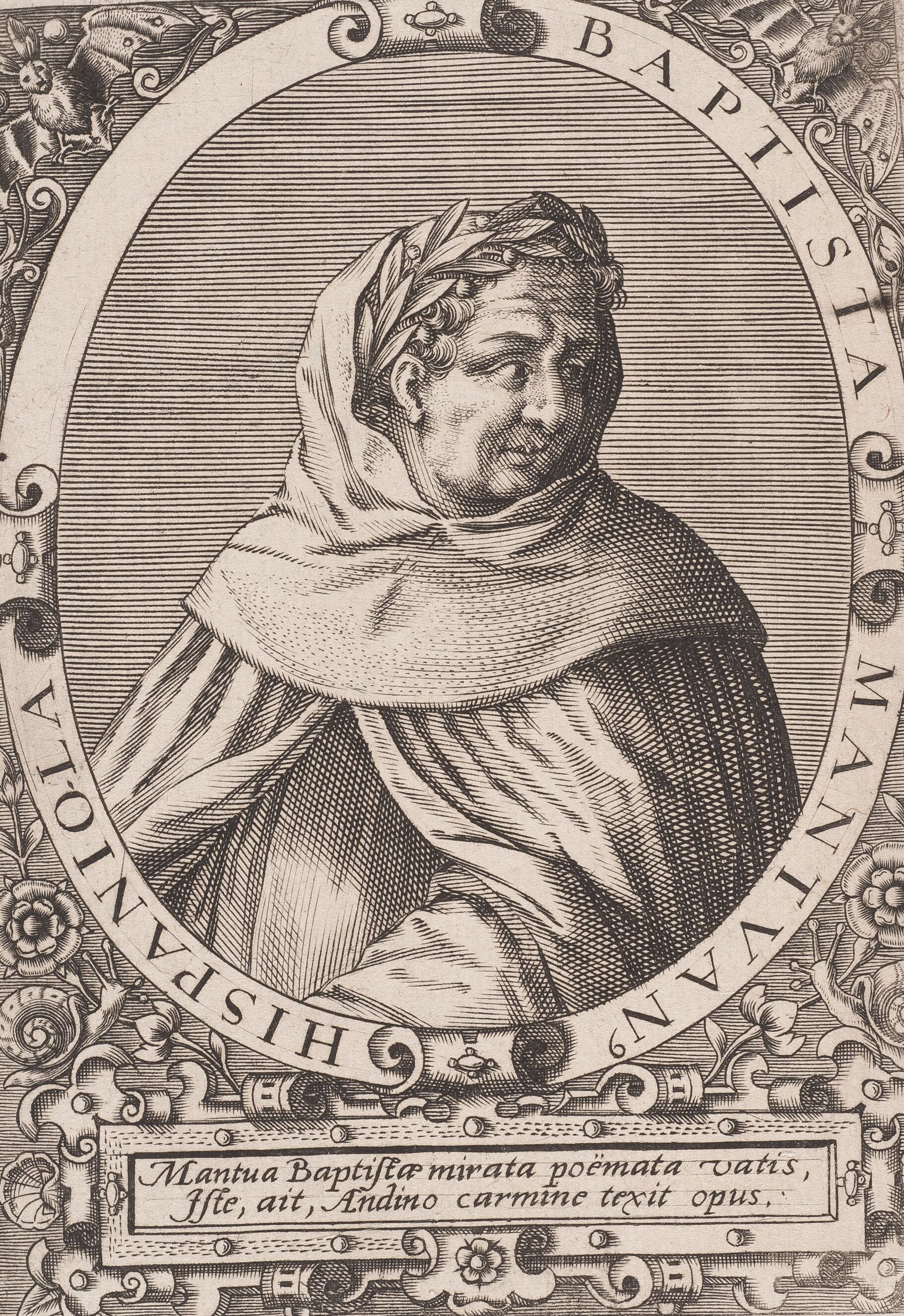
- Baptista Mantovano
- Born: 17 April 1447; Mantua, Italy
- Died: 22 March 1516; Mantua, Italy
- Venerated in: Roman Catholic Church
- Beatified: 1890
- Feast: 20 March

Baptista Spagnuoli Mantuanus, O.Carm (Italian: Battista Mantovano, English: Battista the Mantuan or simply Mantuan; also known as Johannes Baptista Spagnolo; 17 April 1447 – 22 March 1516) was an Italian Carmelite reformer, humanist, and poet.

== Biography ==
Spagnoli was born of a Spanish family that had settled in Mantua, the northern Italian city that gave him his most commonly used English name. He was the eldest son of Peter Spagnoli, a Spanish nobleman at the court of Mantua. He studied there under the humanists Giorgio Merula and Gregorio Tifernate, and subsequently at Padua under Paolo Bagelardi, who was famous for weaving the other liberal arts into his lectures on philosophy. The bad example of his schoolfellows led him into irregularities. He fell into the hands of usurers and, returning home, was turned out of his father's house owing to some calumny. A mystically based sense of calling led Mantuan to enter a reformed branch of the Carmelite order in Ferrara in 1463. During the 1470s he studied theology and taught at the monastery of San Martino in Bologna. He was ordained at Bologna.

The Duke of Mantua entrusted him with the education of his children. First elected vicar general of his congregation of reformed Carmelites in 1483, Mantuan spent most of the decade in Rome. There he acquired the monastery of San Crisogono for his branch of the order, pleaded for Carmelite reforms before Pope Sixtus IV, and preached in a sermon before Pope Innocent VIII against corruption within the Papal Curia. In 1489 Mantuan traveled to Loreto, a town on the Adriatic coast where a shrine with the reputed house of the Virgin Mary had been put under Carmelite governance.

In 1493 he was appointed director of studies at the reformed Carmelite monastery in Mantua. There he participated in an informal academy founded by Isabella d' Este, Marchioness of Mantua, and overseen at times by Baldassare Castiglione and other famous humanist writers and philosophers.

In an election overseen in 1513 by Sigismondo Gonzaga, Mantuan's old pupil and subsequently Cardinal Protector of the Carmelites, he was chosen as general of the whole order. Ill health bedeviled him through much of his life, however, and he died at Mantua early in 1516.

== Works and influence ==
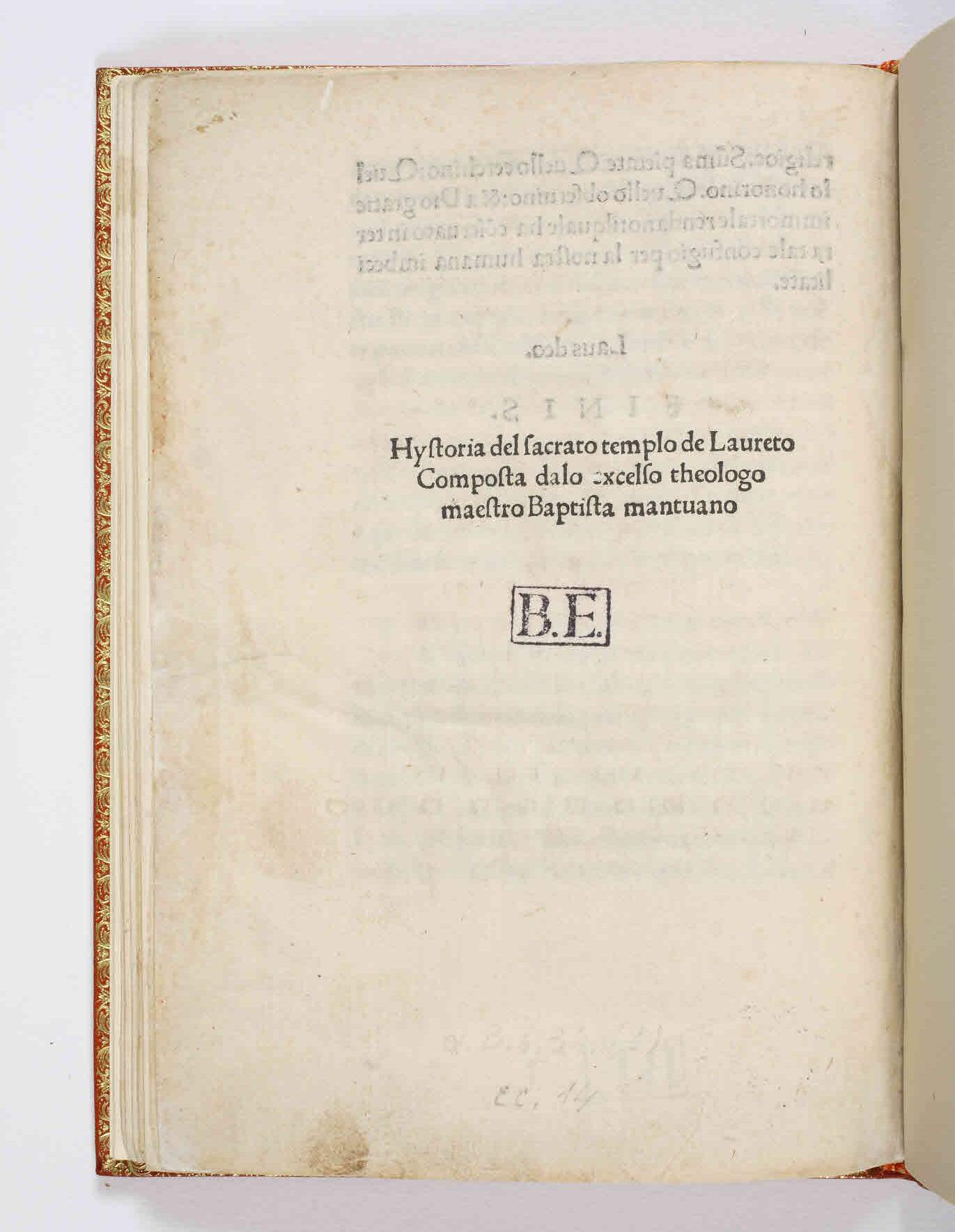
Historia ecclesiae Lauretanae, 1489

Besides his sermon preached before Innocent VIII, Mantuan's most notable works in prose include De patientia, a rambling discourse on physical and spiritual illness that includes an early allusion to Columbus' discovery of America, and De vita beata, a dialogue on the religious life that he wrote soon after entering the Carmelite order. He is also known for his Opus aureum in Thomistas, an early humanist critique of the late medieval philosophy and theology associated with Thomas Aquinas.

Mantuan wrote over 55,000 lines of verse, and it is largely through his poetry that he became famous and influential on the cultures of early modern Europe. De calamitatibus temporum was widely reprinted in the early sixteenth century. A three-book attack on the waywardness of the times, the poem includes a passage on Papal corruption that Martin Luther used prominently in Against the Roman Papacy, An Institution of the Devil, his last great polemic directed against the Curia. Mantuan's Parthenice Mariana initiated a series of seven hagiographic epic poems in which he celebrated in epic language the lives of Mary as well as Catherine of Alexandria and other Roman Catholic saints. The first successful humanist attempt to do so, these poems set a precedent for epic treatments of religious subjects as diverse as Jacopo Sannazaro's De partu virginis and John Milton's Paradise Lost. It is on the basis of Mantuan's hagiographic epics that Desiderius Erasmus made his pronouncement that as a “Christian Virgil" the Italian poet would eventually be seen as a greater writer than Virgil.

Mantuan's greatest success and most influential work was his Adulescentia. In this collection of ten Latin eclogues, he brought together the characters, situations, and themes of Virgilian pastoral with a strain of religious allegory rooted in Carmelite spirituality and a rustic realism compounded of personal observation and the conventions of medieval pastoral art. Schoolmasters commonly used the poems because of their relatively easy Latin and attractive subject matter (the opening eclogues deal with love, a topic one educator notes of interest to all young men). An attack on Papal corruption in one of the poems made Mantuan's collection an especially popular text in Protestant England.

Partly because of their use in the schools, Mantuan's eclogues had a profound effect on English literature in the sixteenth and seventeenth centuries. The collection was twice translated into English, by George Turberville in 1567 and Thomas Harvey in 1656. Early in the sixteenth century Alexander Barclay made adaptations of Mantuan's fifth and sixth eclogues, and a notorious attack on women in his fourth eclogue found numerous English translations and paraphrases during the seventeenth century. As "good old Mantuan" he was memorialized as the foolish Holofernes' favorite author in William Shakespeare's Love's Labour's Lost. A line from his sixth eclogue is echoed in Winter's song at the end of the same play. And his rustic realism stands behind the world of Corin and William in Shakespeare's As You Like It. Unsurprisingly, Mantuan's attack on corruption within the church reverberated through English literature. Eventually it shifted from being used to attack the Papal Curia to become in John Milton's "Lycidas" a sanction for his indictment in pastoral poetry of "our corrupted" English clergy.

As a dominant model for the English eclogue, Mantuan's Adulescentia heavily influenced Edmund Spenser's The Shepheardes Calender. Overall his rustic stylistic decorum sanctioned the English poet's experiments with diction and rough rhythms. Spenser's complaint about the neglect of poets and poetry in "October" draws thematically from Mantuan's fifth eclogue. The Italian poet's condemnation of Papal corruption is used in Spenser's "September" to indict pillaging the wealth of the English Church by Elizabeth and her courtiers. The winter world of February, drawn from Mantuan's sixth eclogue, has been seen to proclaim a harsh "Mantuanesque" world that Spenser set in his poems against the softer world of Arcadian pastoral.

He was beatified in 1890, and his feast day was assigned to 23 March. His relics are in Saint Peter's Cathedral, Mantua.

== Sources ==
- Baptista Spagnuoli Mantuanus. Adulescentia: The Eclogues of Mantuan. Trans. and ed. Lee Piepho. New York: Garland, 1989.
- Battista Spagnoli Mantovano. Adolescentia. Trans. and ed. Andrea Severi. Bologna: Bononia University Press, 2010.
- Lee Piepho. Holofernes’ Mantuan: Italian Humanism in Early Modern England. New York/Bern: Peter Lang, 2001.
- The Eclogues of Mantuan, translated by George Turberville (1567), ed. Douglas Bush. New York: Scholars' Facsimiles & Reprints, 1937 (ISBN 9780820111810).
- Edmondo Coccia. Le edizioni delle opere del Mantovano. Rome: Institutum Carmelitanum, 1960.
- Paul Oskar Kristeller. Medieval Aspects of Renaissance Learning. Durham: Duke University Press, 1974.
- John W. O'Malley. Praise and Blame in Renaissance Rome. Durham: Duke University Press, 1979.
- Helen Cooper. Pastoral: Medieval into Renaissance. Ipswich: D. S. Brewer, 1977.
- Patrick Cullen. Spenser, Marvell, and Renaissance Pastoral. Cambridge: Harvard University Press, 1970.
- Thomas K. Hubbard. The Pipes of Pan: Intertextuality and Literary Filiation in the Pastoral Tradition from Theocritus to Milton. Ann Arbor: Univ. of Michigan Press, 1998.

Preceded by Pierre Terrasse	Prior General of the Order of Carmelites; 1513–1516	Succeeded by Giovanni Batista de Parme
