= Blessed Brocard =

Roman Catholic saint (died c. 1231)

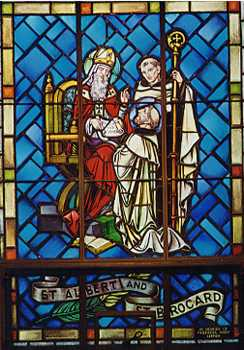
- Born: France
- Died: 1231
- Venerated in: Roman Catholic Church
- Feast: 2 September

Blessed Brocard is said to have been one of the first leaders of hermits at Mount Carmel, and was perhaps the leader of the community on the death of Berthold of Calabria around 1195. Various details of his life are legendary.

== History ==
Brocard (or Burchard, as he is sometimes called), was of French ancestry and a hermit monk at Mount Carmel. The superior of this community, Berthold, died about the year 1195 and Brocard was elected superior.

Around 1207 Brocard approached Albert Avogadro, the papal legate and Latin Patriarch of Jerusalem, for assistance in developing a rule of common life for the monks on Carmel. Albert was a canon regular and composed a brief, 16 chapter rule, for the community. The document is addressed to a community member known only as 'B' (traditionally associated with Brocard, although no historical records exist that clearly identify this individual's full name). Receiving the Rule marks the origin of the Carmelite Order.

Tradition says that Brocard was well-versed in scripture and that Albert planned to take him to the next Lateran Council, but was murdered before the Council took place. Brocard died around 1231. His cult was ordered by the general chapter of 1564. It was removed from the reformed breviary of 1585, but taken up again in 1609; and the proper lessons were approved by the S. Congregation of Rites in 1672. His feast has been again suppressed.

== See also ==
- Hermit
- Carmelites
- Carmelite Rule of St. Albert
- Book of the First Monks
- Constitutions of the Carmelite Order
- Carmelite Rite

== Bibliography ==
- Attwater, Donald and Catherine Rachel John. The Penguin Dictionary of Saints. 3rd edition. New York: Penguin Books, 1993.
- Catholic Online Saints Calendar
- St. Brocard in the History of the Carmelite Order

Preceded by Berthold of Calabria	Prior General of the Order of Carmelites; 1513–1516	Succeeded by Cyrille
