= Carmelites =

Catholic religious order

Order of the Brothers of the Blessed Virgin Mary of Mount Carmel
- Ordo Fratrum Beatissimæ Virginis Mariæ de Monte Carmelo (Latin)
- Coat of arms of the order
- Abbreviation: OCarm
- Formation: Late 12th century
- Founders: Early hermits of Mount Carmel
- Founded at: Mount Carmel
- Type: Mendicant order of pontifical right
- Legal status: Institute of Consecrated Life
- Members: 2,041 members (includes 1,303 priests) (2022)
- Motto: Zelo zelatus sum pro Domino Deo exercituum (Latin for 'With zeal have I been zealous for the Lord God of hosts')
- General Headquarters: Curia Generalizia dei Carmelitani; Via Giovanni Lanza, 138, 00184 Rome, Italy
- Prior General: Desiderio García Martínez, OCarm (2025-)
- Patron saints: Our Lady of Mount Carmel; Elijah
- Parent organization: Catholic Church
- Website: ocarm.org

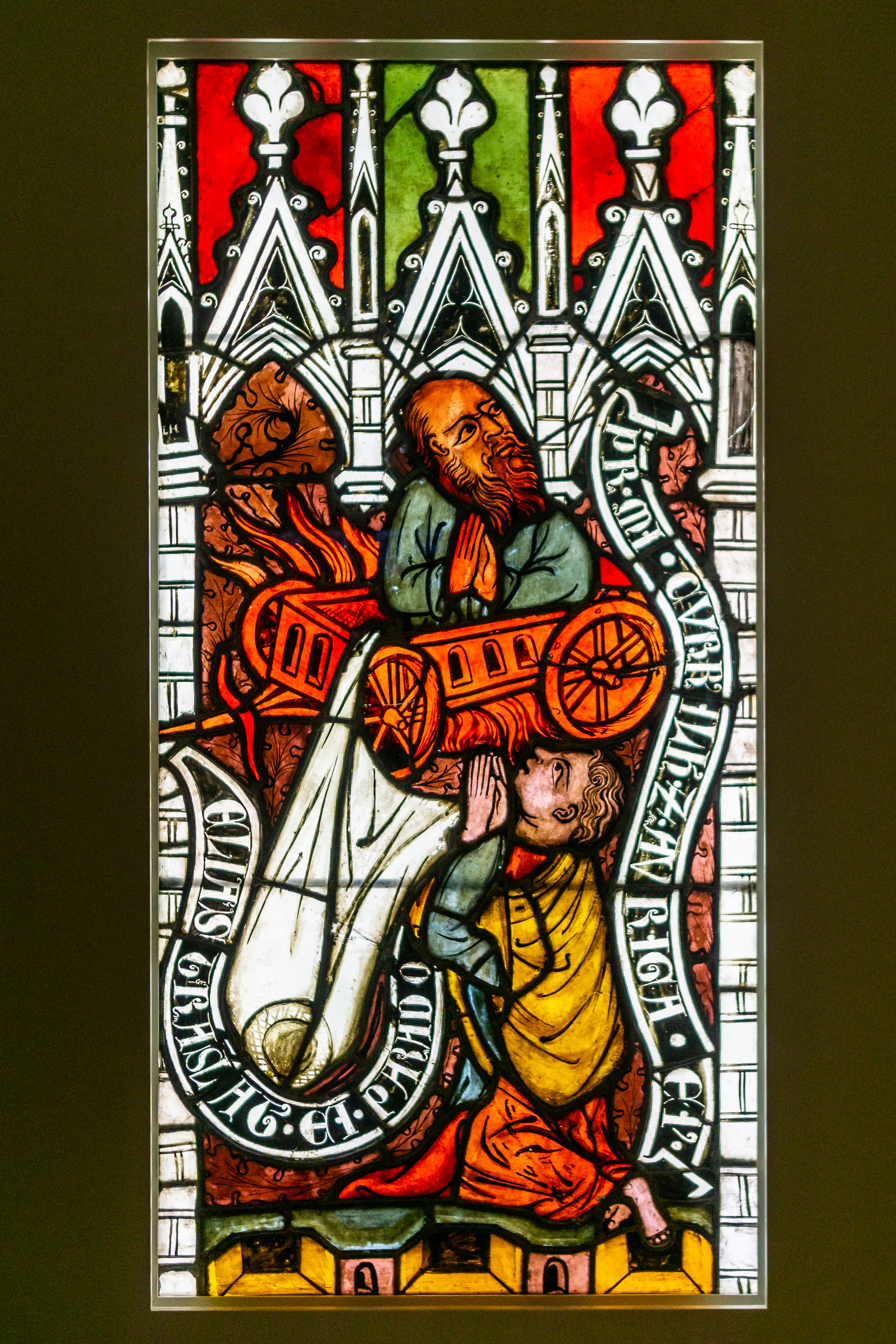
The Prophet Elijah (here ascending to heaven while Elisha is looking on, 14th-century glass window) is regarded as the spiritual father of the Carmelite order.

The Order of the Brothers of the Blessed Virgin Mary of Mount Carmel (Latin: Ordo Fratrum Beatissimæ Virginis Mariæ de Monte Carmelo; abbreviated OCarm), known as the Carmelites or sometimes by synecdoche known simply as Carmel, is a mendicant order in the Catholic Church for both men and women. Historical records about its origin remain uncertain; it was probably founded in the 12th century on Mount Carmel in the Holy Land.

== Names ==
The Order of the Brothers of the Blessed Virgin Mary of Mount Carmel are also known simply as the Carmelites or the Carmelite Order. To differentiate themselves from the Discalced Carmelites (founded in 1562), who grew out of the older order but today have more members, the original Carmelites are sometimes known as the Carmelites of the Ancient Observance and very rarely the Calced Carmelites (discalced being a reference to some religious orders going barefoot or wearing sandals instead of shoes).

== History ==
Historical records about its origin remain uncertain, but the order was probably founded in the 12th century on Mount Carmel in the Crusader States. Berthold of Calabria, as well as Albert of Vercelli, have traditionally been associated with the founding of the order, but few clear records of early Carmelite history have survived. The order of Carmelite nuns was formalised in 1452.

=== Spiritual origin ===
The Carmelite Order is one of the few religious orders, if not the only one, not to refer to a charismatic founder, but to a prophet of the Old Testament: Elijah and his disciple Elisha are considered by the Carmelites as the spiritual fathers of the order. Tradition indicates the presence on Mount Carmel of a series of Jewish and then Christian hermits who lived, prayed and taught in the caves used by Elijah and Elisha. This is how the first Christian hermits (at the origin of the founding of the order) settled in the caves of Mount Carmel to pray to God. The first chapel built within the hermitages and bringing together this community is dedicated to the Virgin Mary. Very quickly, the spirituality of the order turned to Mary who became the queen and mistress of Carmel.

=== Hermit and monastic life on Mount Carmel ===
Before the presence of the Carmelites, in the 6th century Byzantine monks built a monastery dedicated to Saint Elijah in a valley a few kilometers south of the present monastery. This was destroyed in 614 by the Persians of Khosrow II. Around 1150, a Greek monk from Calabria established a community of about ten members among the ruins of the ancient Byzantine monastery which he rebuilt and renamed Saint Elijah.

=== Foundation of the Order on Mount Carmel ===
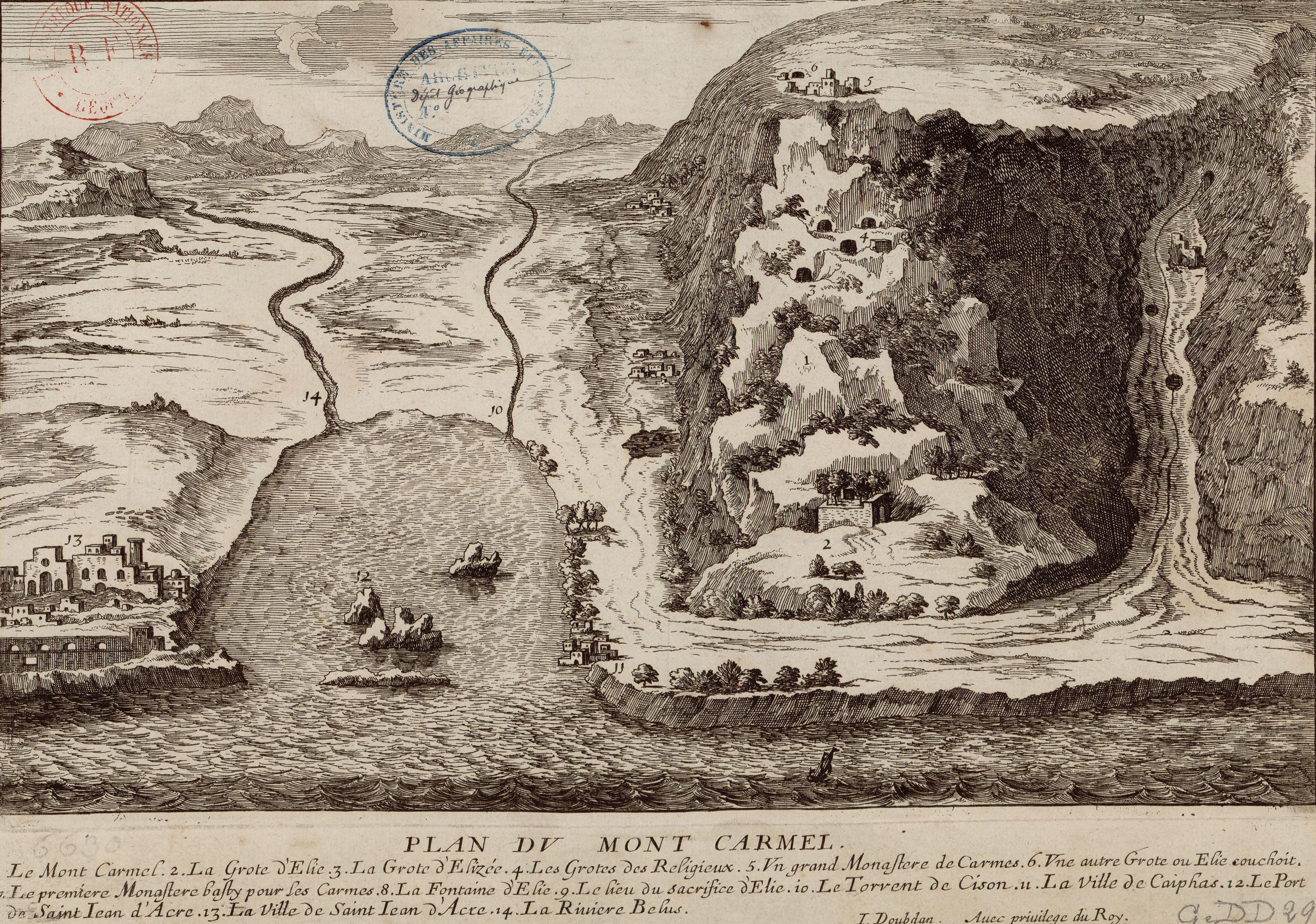
Plan of Mount, Relief view of Mount Carmel and Haifa Bay in the 17th century

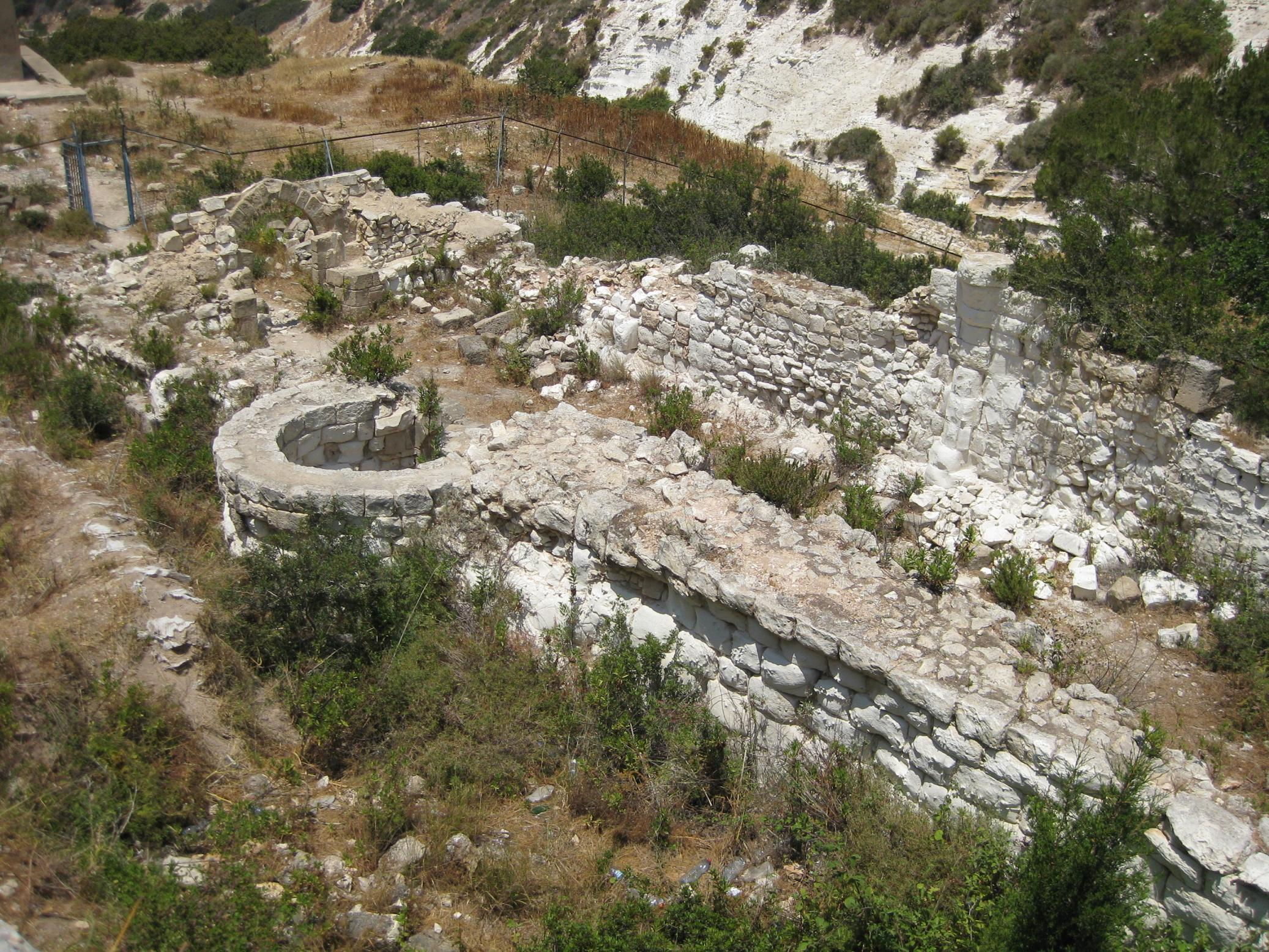
Ruins of the first church on the slopes of Mount Carmel

Tradition indicates that the order was founded in 1185, but that is based on the story of a pilgrim in the Holy Land, the interpretation of which remains questionable. The oldest (and most reliable) written accounts of the presence of Latin hermits on Mount Carmel date back to 1220 and another text from 1263 (See Steinmann 1963, p. 24). During the Third Crusade, a group of hermits led by Berthold of Calabria began to inhabit the caves of Mount Carmel following the prophet Elijah. This first monastery was located in the east–west facing valley located 3.5 km (2.2 mi) south of the current monastery, and east of the "Haifa Sde Yehoshua Cemetery".

At the beginning of the 13th century, their leader was supposed to be Brocard, although written evidence is lacking. In the Carmelite rule, reference is made only to "Brother B." (in the introductory sentence of the rule) who asked the patriarch for a rule of life for hermits. Tradition has established that it was Brocard, second prior general of the order, who asked the Latin Patriarch of Jerusalem, Albert of Vercelli, to provide the group of hermits with a written rule of life. This rule, dated 1209, is centered on prayer and defined the way of life of hermits.

The first act of the Order of Brothers of The Blessed Virgin Mary of Mount Carmel was to dedicate a chapel to the Virgin Mary under the title of Mary, Star of the Sea (in Latin: Stella Maris). Elisabeth Steinmann considers it probable that the hermits of Mount Carmel also settled in some cities of Palestine (Acre, Israel, Tyre, Tripoli, Beaulieu in Lebanon), but after a few decades, these hermits began to leave the Holy Land as a result of the insecurity linked to the Muslim reconquests which marked the end of the Crusades. They then returned to Europe where they spread this new monastic order.

The rule of St. Albert was not approved by a pope until 30 January 1226 in the bull Ut vivendi normam of Honorius III. In 1229 Pope Gregory IX confirmed this rule again and gave it the status of Regula bullata.

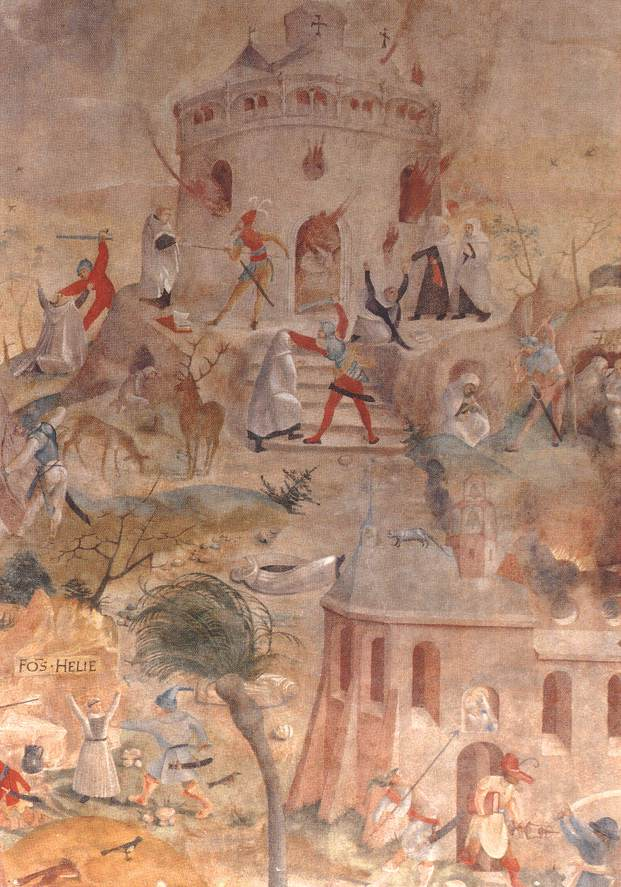
The Martyrdom of the Carmelites marked the end of the hermit life of the Carmelites on Mount Carmel

At the end of the first crusade led by Louis IX of France in the Holy Land in 1254 (the Seventh Crusade), Louis brought six Carmelites back to France who joined with those who since 1238 had started to seek and found houses all over Europe. The fall of Saint-Jean-d'Acre in 1291, and the fall of the Latin state of Outremer led to the destruction of the last Carmelite convents in the Holy Land. The Carmelites who had chosen to remain there were massacred by the Mamelukes.

Jerg Ratgeb painted a fresco retracing the life of the Carmelites at the beginning of the 16th century, on the walls of the refectory of the Carmelite monastery in Frankfurt.

=== From hermits to friars ===
Back in Europe, the hermits of Carmel encountered many difficulties. Their eremitic life did not adapt well to their new settlements, they were scattered in different nations, and they found themselves in "competition" with other mendicant orders. Pope Innocent III wished to bring the mendicant orders all together under the direction of the Order of Friars Minor and the Order of Preachers. In 1215, the Fourth Lateran Council decided to group the existing Mendicant orders under the two primary ones. In 1274 the Second Council of Lyon disestablished all mendicant orders that were founded after 1215; only four remained: the Franciscans, the Order of Preachers, the Carmelites, and the Augustinians. The Carmelites, barely spared, had to change their way of life from eremitic to mendicant.

Gradually, during the 13th century, Carmelite hermits returning from Mount Carmel resettled throughout Europe, e.g. in Cyprus, Sicily, Italy, England, and southern France. Some dates and locations are known:

- in 1235, Pierre de Corbie and his companion settled in the Duchy of Hainaut (Valenciennes)
- in 1242, Carmelites settled in Aylesford, Kent, England
- in 1244, Carmelites disembarked in Marseille, France, and settled in caves in Aygalades
- in 1259, Carmelites settled in Paris, France
- in 1279, Carmelites settled in Dublin, Ireland

However, the new settlements of the Carmelites in the European cities were very different from their eremitical life on Mount Carmel. In addition, they faced hostility from the secular clergy and even from other mendicant orders, who saw them as competitors.

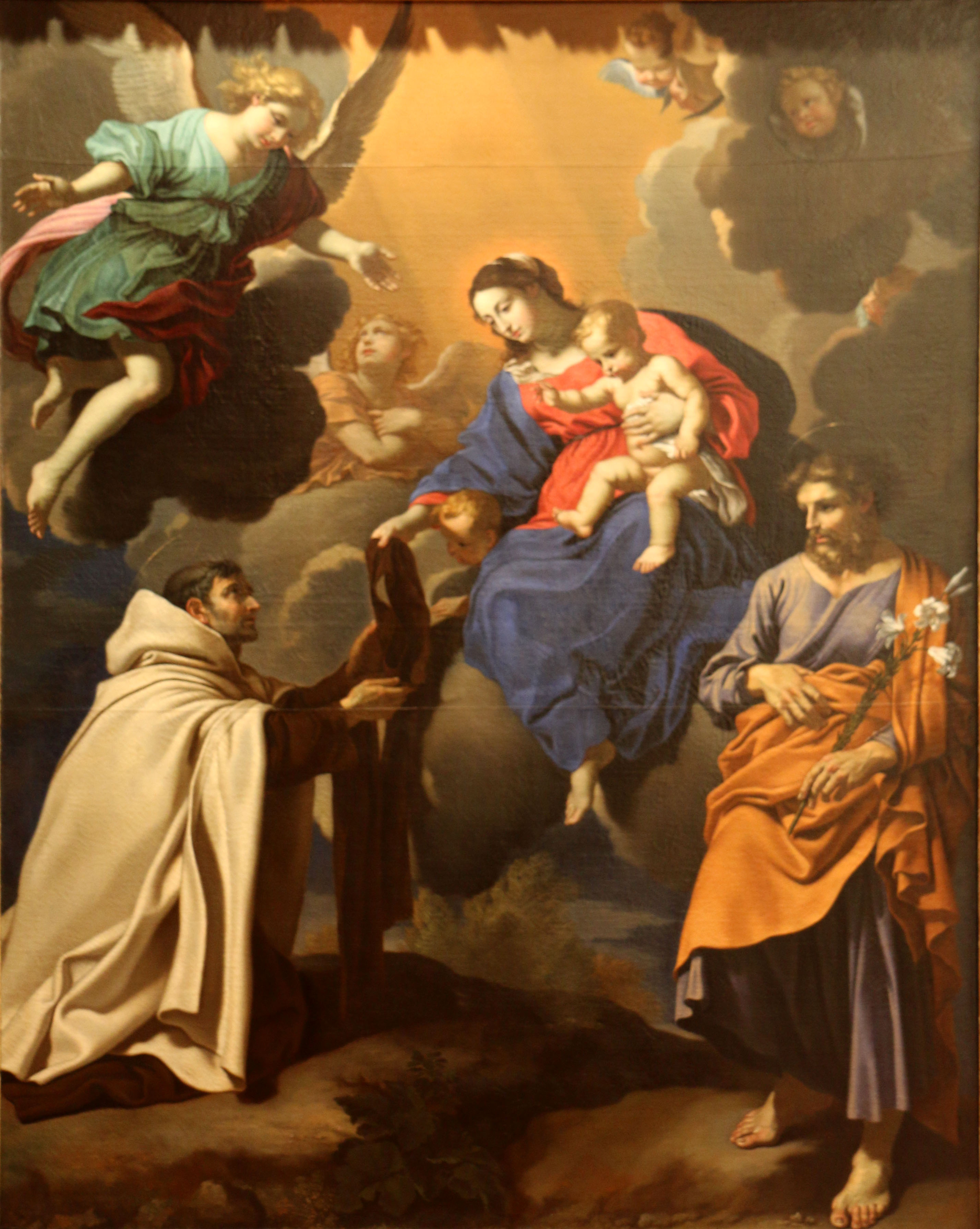
The Virgin Mary presenting the Scapular to Saint Simon Stock

According to tradition, the prior general of the Carmelites, Simon Stock, worried about the very tenuous situation that the order was in; it was still threatened with dissolution by the Catholic Church. As a result, he intensely prayed to the Blessed Virgin Mary to aid the order. In 1251, Our Lady of Mount Carmel appeared to him accompanied by a multitude of angels and holding in her hand the Scapular of the Order. In his vision, Mary said,

Receive, my dear son, this scapular of your Order, as the distinctive sign of the mark of the privilege that I have obtained for you and the children of Carmel; it is a sign of salvation, a safeguard in perils and the pledge of peace and special protection until the end of the centuries. Whoever dies in this garment will be preserved from eternal fires.

Following this vision and the spread of the Scapular, the Order of Carmel endured and spread rapidly. However, the historicity of these events is now disputed because of the lack of contemporary written records for the period. The earliest extant written records are from approximately 150 years after the fact, and some documents contradict this narrative.

In the bull Paganorum incursus of 27 July 1247, Pope Innocent IV officially denominated the order the "Brothers of the Blessed Virgin Mary of Mount Carmel" and asked bishops to kindly accept them in their dioceses. However, the hostility of the secular clergy to the Carmelites was such that it prompted repetition of this recommendation on 4 October later that year.

In 1247, the Carmelites asked Pope Innocent IV to modify the Rule of Saint Albert of 1209 to adapt it to their new way of life in cities. In this modification, the communal dimension of their life was clearly emphasized. Pope Innocent IV clarified and corrected some ambiguities and mitigated some severities of the original Rule, and on 1 October 1247 he established the text in the bull Quae honorem conditoris omnium. Thereafter, the Carmelites no longer ate meals in their cells separately and instead ate in common in a refectory. Also, they preached and heard confessions in secular (ordinary) churches.

The last great uncertainty for the survival of the order occurred in 1274. During the sanota vacillationis session of 17 July 1274, the Second Council of Lyon, presided by Pope Gregory X, suppressed all the mendicant orders that lacked regular legal status (incert mendicita). The Carmelites defended the anteriority of their foundation, including their founding being before 1215, the pertinent decisions of the Fourth Lateran Council, and they emphasized their pontifical approvals. After many Carmelite interventions during this session, the Pope confirmed their anteriority.

After the General Chapter of the Order of 1287 in Montpellier, France, the Carmelites replaced the white and brown striped (or barred) coat of their habit with a white cloak, because of which cloak they therefore colloquially were denominated "White Friars".

The assimilation of the Carmelites as a mendicant order in 1326 by Pope John XXII ended the final hindrances, and the Carmelites could then rightly perform their apostolic mission. Nonetheless, a conflict ensued between the Carmelites who desired an eremitic life and those who desired an apostolic life in cities, including preaching. Consequently, two kinds of Carmelite monastery developed, one in the heart of cities and another outside them. At this point, Carmelites began to study theology at universities.

=== Mitigation of the rule ===
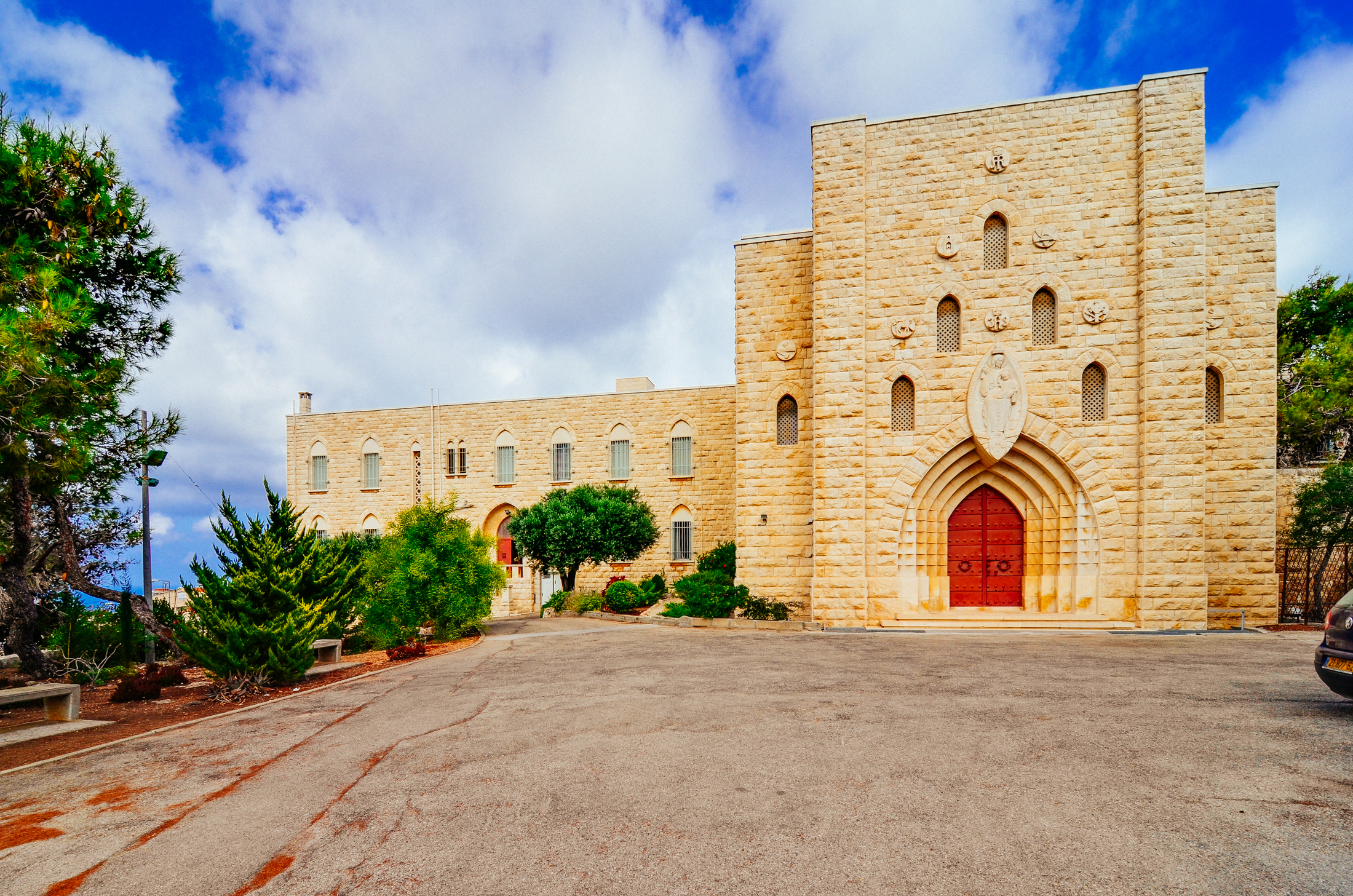
Monastery of Our Lady of Mount Carmel on Mount Carmel, in Haifa, Israel

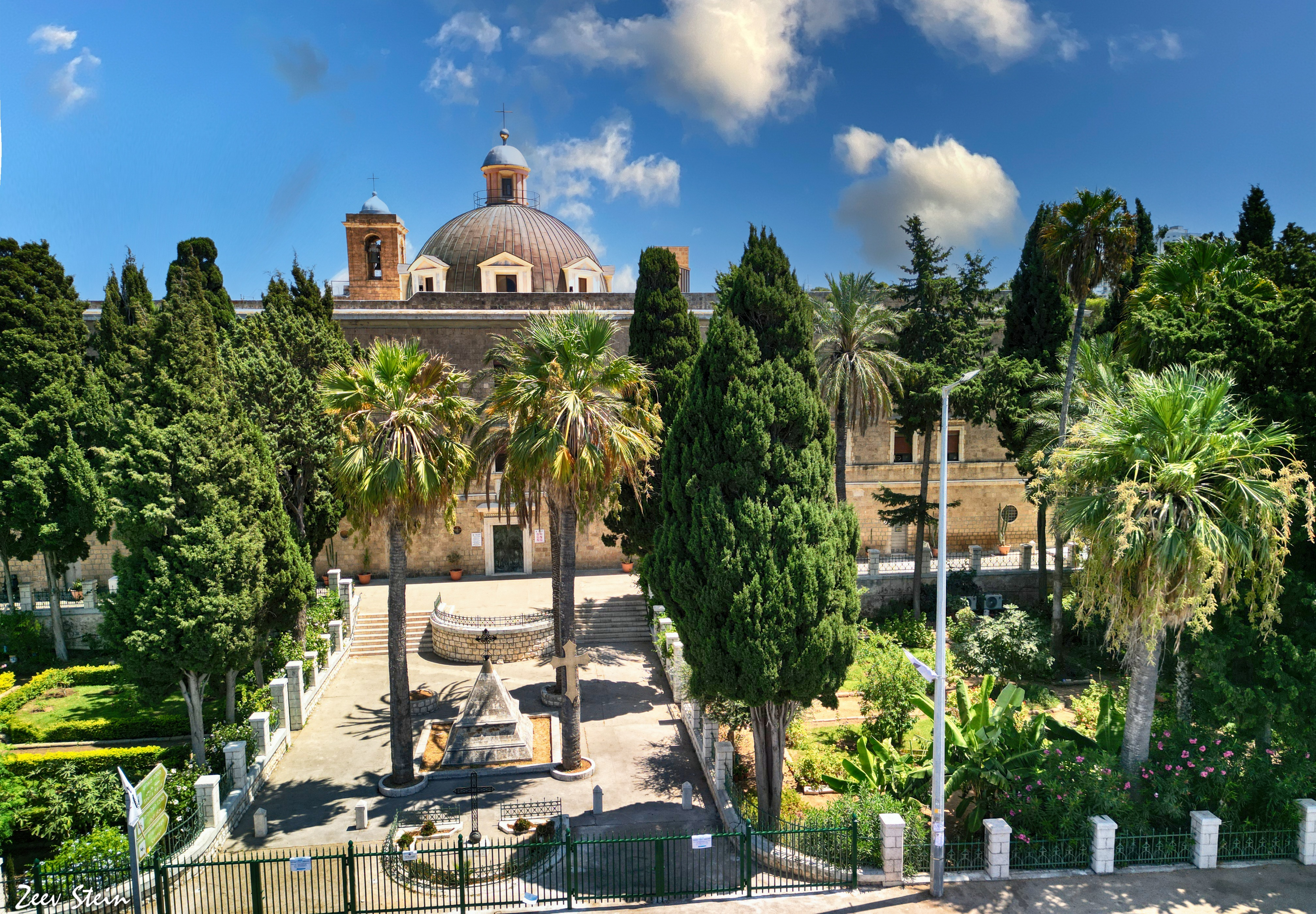
Stella Maris Monastery on Mount Carmel, in Haifa, Israel

The mitigation of the Rule came after the great epidemic of the Black Death in the middle of the 14th century, which brought about a collapse of the European population accompanied by a decrease of members of monastic orders.

During the chapter of Nantes, a majority of Carmelites asked to appeal to Pope Eugene IV for a second mitigation of the Rule of 1209 of Saint Albert; the reform of 1247 was considered the first mitigation.

The letter, dated 15 February 1432, indicated that

Many professed members of the Order can no longer observe the rule because of its severity and rigor, both because of the fragility human than by weakness of the body.

Two Carmelites were sent to convey this request to the Pope. The Pope responded in 1435 with the bull Romani Pontificis, dated 15 February 1432, the date of the petition. Addressed to the Prior General, Jean Faci, the bull granted the Carmelites permission to freely and lawfully stay and walk "in their churches, and in the cloisters of these and in the places adjoining them at the appropriate times", moreover, it granted the faculty to eat meat three days a week, except during Advent and Lent and on other days when this was prohibited by general law.

Pope Pius II completed this permission on 5 December 1469 by granting the Prior General the faculty of dispensing from fasting on days when abstinence was lifted.

Pope Sixtus IV granted greater freedom, commonly known as Mare magnum, in the bull Dum attendant meditatatione of 28 November 1476, which conceded many advantages to the mendicant orders. However, this mitigation of the Rule was somewhat resisted. Even before its promulgation, there was some protest against "a general relaxation" of the Rule.

=== Attempts of reforms ===
The advantages of the new rule were sometimes frowned upon in certain monasteries which wished to return to the old rule of 1247. The convents of La Selve (near Florence), Mantua and Géronde (Switzerland) thrived because of their tendency to observe the ancient observant rule. The Carmelites of Mantua obtained from Pope Eugene IV the bull Fama laudabilis, in 1442, which allowed them to be a separate congregation, governed by a vicar general and only distantly subject to the prior general. While influential during the 15th century, the "Reform of Mantua" subsequently became of marginal influence. Finally, this mitigation introduced around 1465 was definitively incorporated into the regulation of the Order of the Great Carmelites in 1783 by Pope Pius VI.

John Soreth, a friar from the Carmelite Convent of Caen, who served as Prior General in the years 1451–1471, tried to convince his subjects to lead a more rigorous religious life by developing seeds already sown and promoting movements that already existed. His motto was "Return to the Rule of Saint Albert". In his early decrees he protested against privileges and exemptions, seen as a major cause of the decline of the order.

The constitutions of the order dating from 1362 were revised and the text approved by the general chapter of Brussels in 1462. They insisted on

The divine office, the vow of poverty, silence and solitude, the custody of the convent and the cell, studies, work and the visits of the superiors.

The reform took hold in some of the convents, the "observant convents", and the "mixed convents". John Soreth hoped that his reform would gradually be imposed in all the houses of the order, but this attempt at reform remained largely unfulfilled since the prior general who followed him favored a return to a mitigation of the rule, and met with the approval of Popes Pius II and Sixtus IV.

In 1523 Pope Hadrian VI appointed Nicolas Audet as vicar general. The latter organized a centralization of the government of the different provinces while ensuring the training of the religious.

In 1499, the Reform of Albi aimed at a return to a more strict observance and in 1513 was approved as a "Congregation of Observance". However, this reform was suppressed in 1584 by Pope Gregory XIII

In 1603, Henri Sylvius, Prior General of the Order, went to France at the request of the king Henri IV of France, to undertake with Philippe Thibault the reform of the province of Touraine. Pierre Behourt, Louis Charpentier, Philippe Thibault and Jean de Saint-Samson were to be the initiators and architects of this reform of the Carmelites of the Old observance. Figures of note in the Catholic Reformation, they were supported by Cardinal Charles Borromeo, Archbishop of Milan. On 20 June 1604, at the provincial chapter of Nantes, Henri Sylvius published the statutes of the reform, which intended to promote the interior life and return to the ancient tradition of the order, under the patronage of the Virgin Mary and Saint Joseph.

By the middle of the 17th century, most of the French provinces had adopted the reform, which had already won over the convents of Belgium (1624) and Germany. Its constitutions were definitively affirmed in 1635.

In 1645, during the general chapter held in Rome, the provincial of Touraine, Léon de Saint-Jean, was appointed a member of a committee to further revise these constitutions with a view to having them adopted by all the reformed convents of the order.

=== Foundation of Carmelite Nuns ===
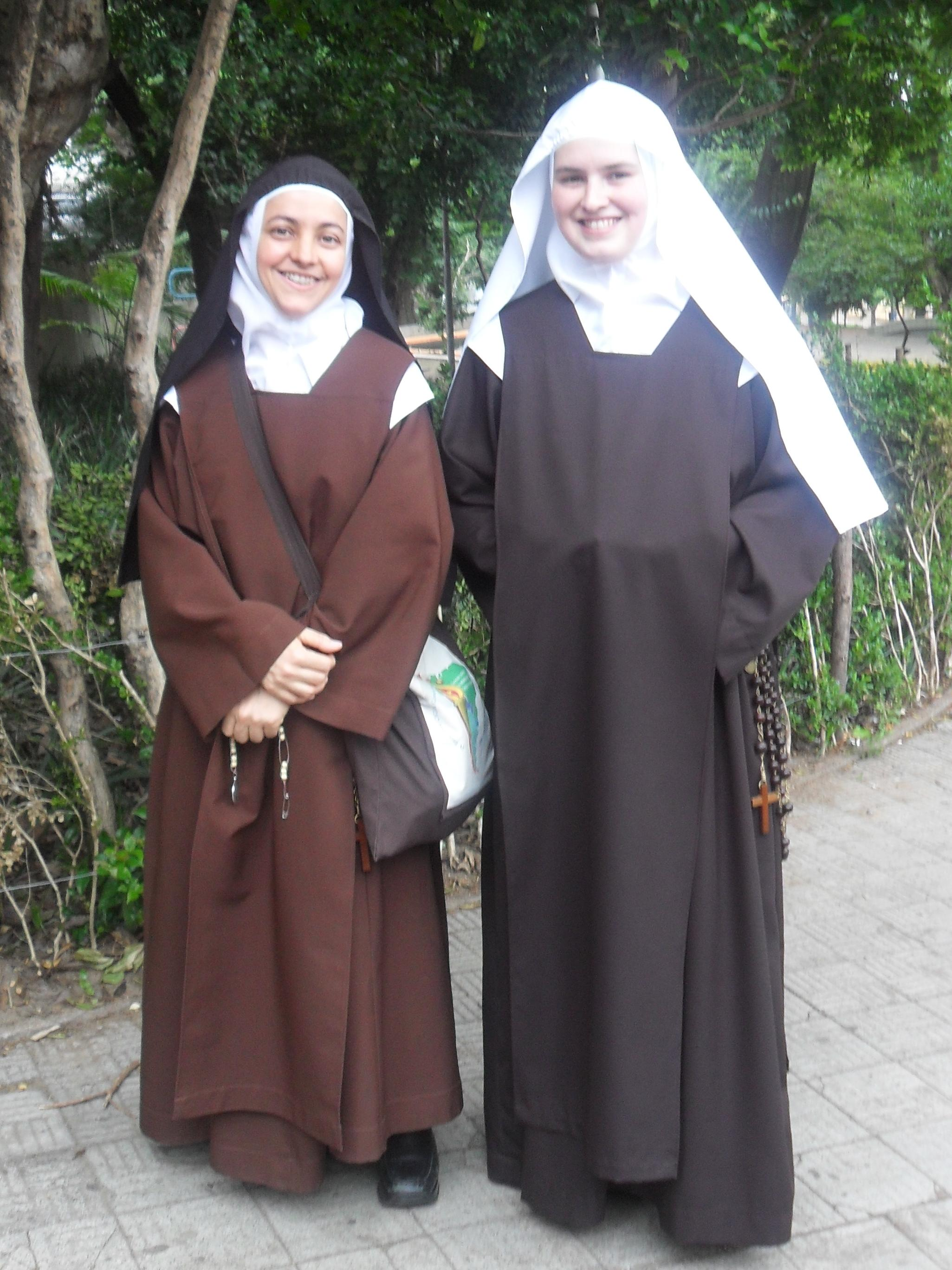
Carmelite nuns

From the Middle Ages, women close to the communities of Carmelite friars were drawn to their life of prayer. Thus, in the Low Countries some beguinages adopted the Carmelite rule and thus formed communities in the second half of the 15th century. Prior General John Soreth worked to transform these beguinages into Carmelite women's convents.

On 7 October 1452, Pope Nicholas V promulgated the bull Cum Nulla introducing the Carmelites in France. Under his protection, Françoise d'Amboise (†1485), Duchess of Brittany, erected the first convent for Carmelite nuns in France. In 1463, a house was built in Vannes to accommodate a first community and on 2 November 1463 nine nuns arrived there from Liège and settled permanently. While the Vannes convent, such as Les Trois Maries, was to suffer suppression in 1792, during the French Revolution, in the meantime convents of Carmelite nuns had spread rapidly, including many in Spain and Italy.

=== Foundation of the Third Order ===
John Soreth played an extremely important role in the founding of the Third Order of the Carmelites. Pope Nicholas V supported this action in his bull Cum Nulla, too.

In France, there were many Carmelite fraternities of the Third Order before the Revolution. Many died during the French Revolution, but a few evolved and organized themselves into a religious congregation of apostolic life.

Currently the Third Order of the Blessed Virgin Mary of Mount Carmel has a large number of fraternities in many countries. Following the return of the Carmelites of the Old observance to France in 1989, at the request of the laity, fraternities began to be formed. The first fraternity was established in the diocese of Toulon in 1992. A second was in Nantes in 2001.

=== Teresian reform ===
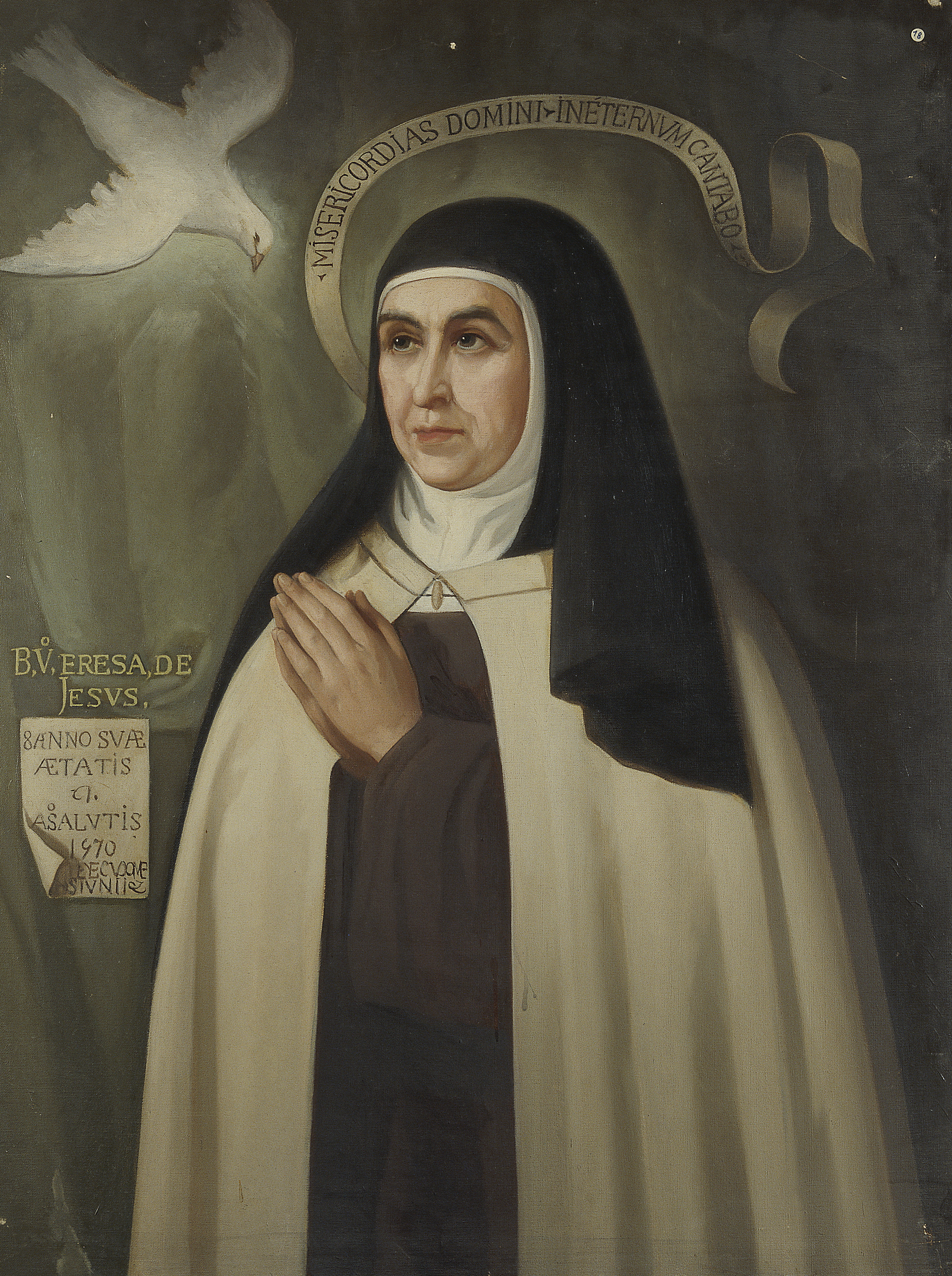
Teresa of Ávila (1515–1582)

Reform in Spain began in earnest in the 1560s, with the work of Teresa of Ávila, who, together with John of the Cross, established the Discalced Carmelites. Teresa's foundations were welcomed by King Philip II of Spain, who was most anxious for all orders to be reformed according to the principles of the Council of Trent (1545–1563). But she created practical problems at the grassroots level. The proliferation of new religious houses in towns that were already struggling to cope economically was an unwelcome prospect. Local townspeople resisted direction by the nobility and diocesan clergy. Teresa tried to make her monasteries as self-sufficient as was practicable, and accordingly restricted the number of nuns in each community.

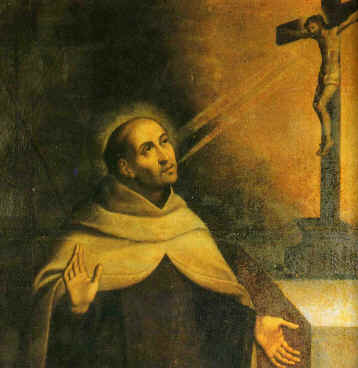
John of the Cross (1542–1591)

The Discalced Carmelites also faced much opposition from unreformed Carmelite houses, as when Carmelites from Toledo arrested and imprisoned John of the Cross in their monastery. Only in the 1580s did the Discalced Carmelites gain official approval of their status. In 1593, the Discalced Carmelites had their own superior general styled praepositus general, the first such being Nicholas Doria. Due to the politics of foundation, the Discalced friars in Italy were canonically erected as a separate juridical entity.

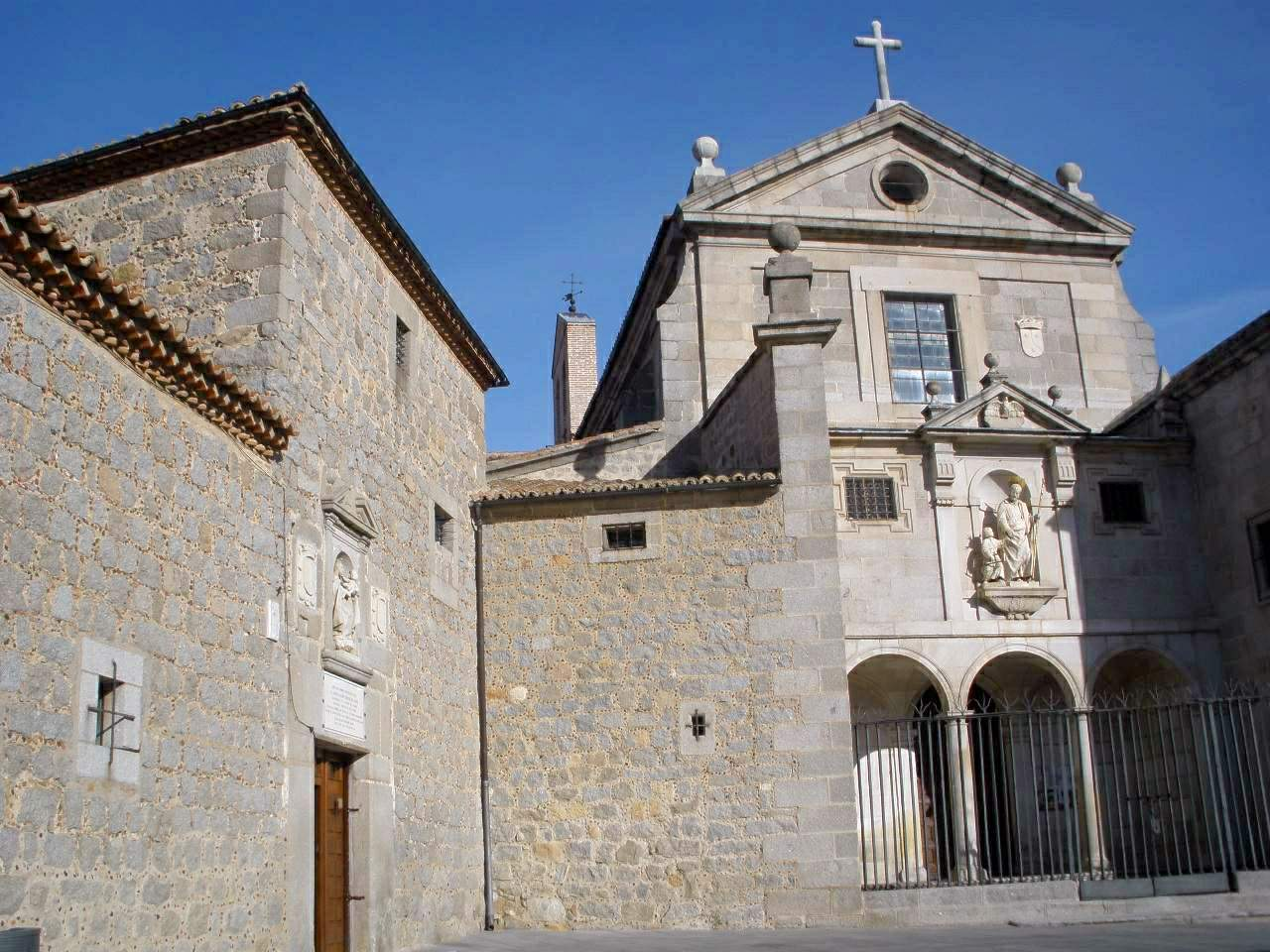
The Convent of Saint Joseph in Ávila (Spain) was the first foundation of the Discalced Carmelites

After the rise of Protestantism and the devastation of the French Wars of Religion, a spirit of reform renewed 16th–17th century France, as well as the Carmelite Order in France. In the late 16th century, Pierre Behourt began an effort to restore the state of the Province of Touraine, which was continued by the practical reforms of Philip Thibault. The Provincial Chapter of 1604 appointed Thibault the prior of the Convent in Rennes, and moved the Novitiate to Rennes, thereby ensuring that new members of the Province would be formed by the reform-minded friars. The Observance of Rennes advocated poverty, the interior life and regular observance as the antidote to the laxity and decadence into which religious life had fallen, in addition, incorporating currents of renewal from the Discalced Reform, the French School, and the Society of Jesus. Thibault is said to have wished to marry the spirit of the society with the Order of Carmelites as far as possible. One of the most renowned figures of the Reform was John of St. Samson, a blind lay brother, highly regarded for his humility and exalted spiritual life. In 1612, Br. John was moved to the Convent at Rennes and, in addition to playing the organ, served as the instructor and spiritual director of the novices. Thus John of St. Samson became known as the "Soul of the Reform." Eventually, the Observance of Rennes spread to priories throughout France, Belgium, and Germany, and became known as the Touraine Reform, after the Province from which the movement originated.

Carmelite nunneries were established in New Spain (Mexico), the first founded in 1604 in Puebla de los Angeles, New Spain's second largest city, followed by one in the capital Mexico City 1616. In all, before Mexican independence in 1821, there were five Carmelite convents among 56 nunneries.

=== Papebroch controversy ===
Daniel Papebroch was a member of the Bollandists, a group of Jesuit hagiographers who produced the Acta Sanctorum, which took an analytical approach to the "Lives of the Saints". In his preliminary commentary on Albert of Vercelli, who is credited with the Carmelite Rule, Papebroch said that the tradition universally received by the Carmelites, that the origin of the order dated back to the prophet Elias, as its founder, was insufficiently grounded. The Carmelites took exception to this.

From 1681 to 1693 there appeared between twenty or thirty pamphlets castigating Papebroch and his work. The series culminated in the large quarto volume signed by Sebastian of St. Paul, provincial of the Flemish-Belgian province of the Carmelite Order, which made serious charges against Papebroch's orthodoxy. Learning that steps were being taken to obtain a condemnation from Rome of the Acta Sanctorum, the Bollandists responded. Conrad Janninck replied first with open letters to Sebastian of St. Paul. The two letters were printed in 1693, followed by a more extended defense of the "Acta", published by Janninck in 1695. Papebroch published his rebuttal in 1696, 1697, and 1698 in the three volumes of the "Responsio Danielis Papebrochii ad Exhibitionem Errorum".

When Rome did not issue a condemnation the adversaries of Papebroch had recourse to the tribunal of the Spanish Inquisition, which in November, 1695, issued a decree condemning the fourteen volumes of the Acta Sanctorum published up to that time and branding it heretical. Janninck was sent to Rome not only to prevent the confirmation by Rome of the decree of the Spanish Inquisition, but also to secure the retraction of the decree. In December, 1697, he received the assurance that no censure would be passed against the volumes condemned in Spain. On 20 November 1698, Pope Innocent XII issued a brief that ended the controversy by imposing silence on both parties. Whether it was judged prudent in Rome not to enter into conflict with the Spanish tribunal, or whether the latter prolonged the affair by passive resistance, the decree of condemnation made in 1695 was not revoked until 1715, the year following the death of Papebroch.

=== Modern history ===
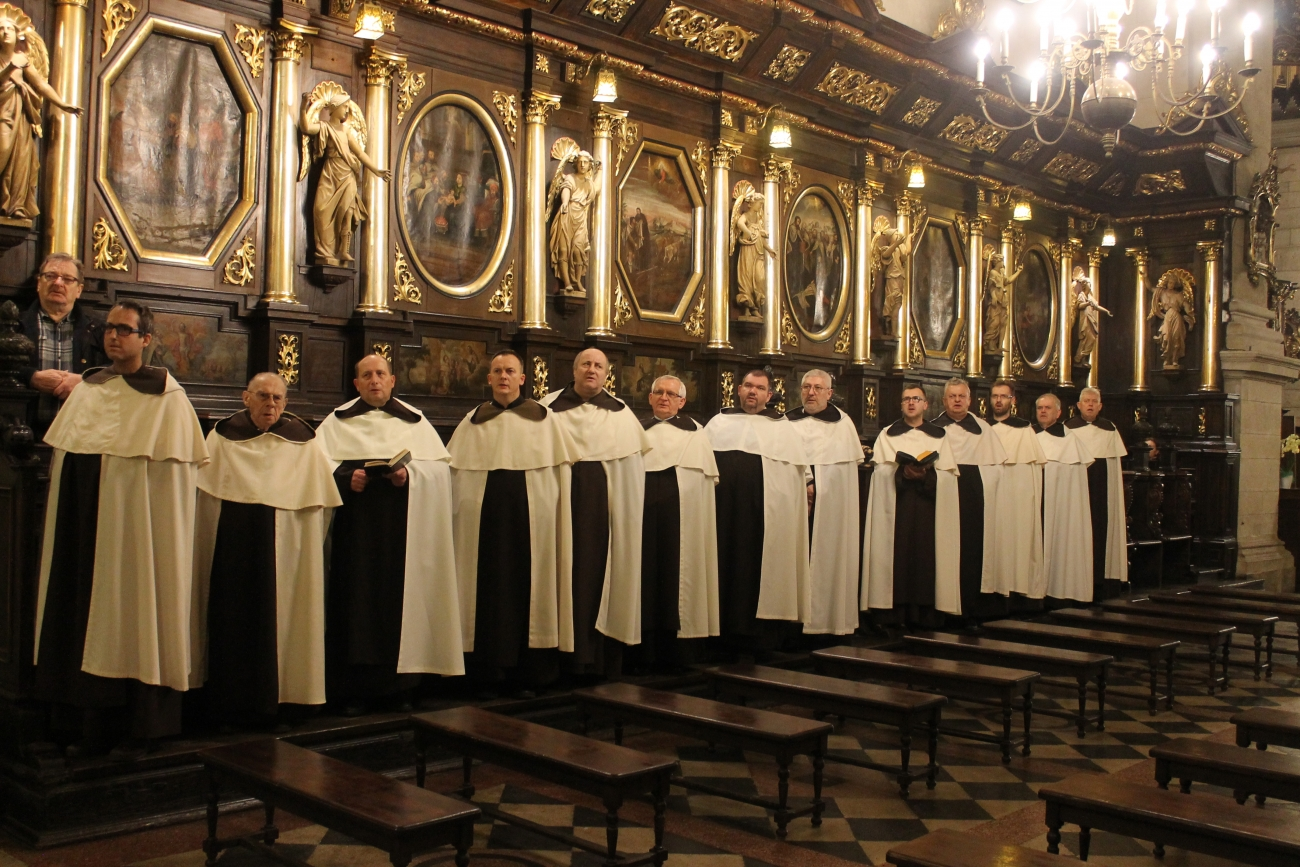
Carmelites of the ancient observance in choir (2020)

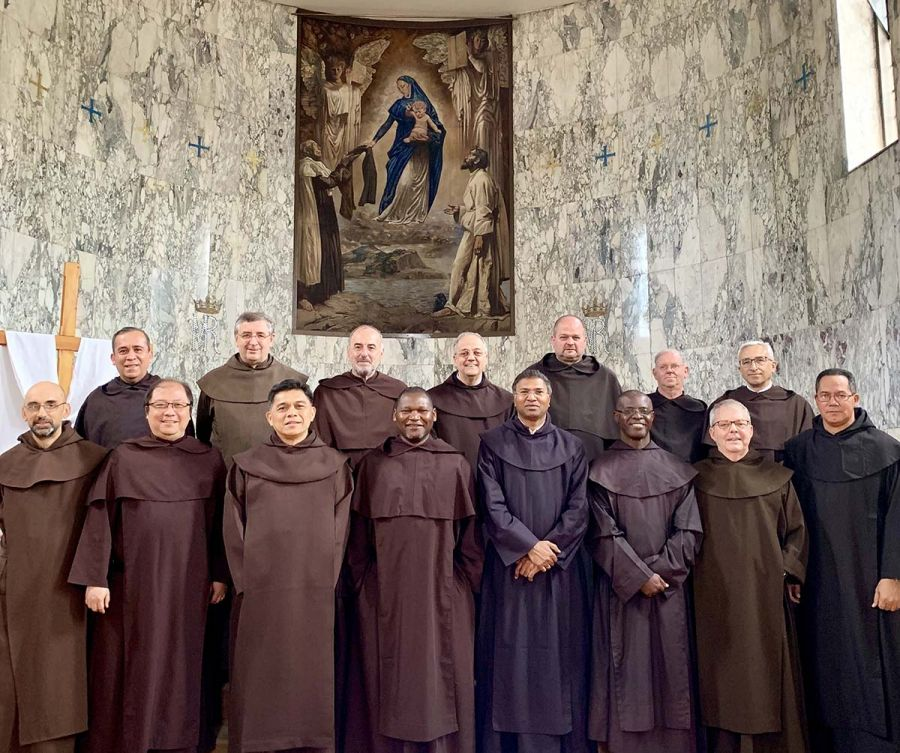
The General councils of Carmelites of the ancient observance (OCarm) and Discalced Carmelites (OCD)

Leaders of the Carmelite Order meet from time to time in General Congregation. The most recent General Congregation took place in Fátima, Portugal in September 2016. Since the 1430s, the Congregation of Mantua had continued to function in its little corner of Italy. It was only at the end of the 19th century that those following the reform of Tourraine (by this time known as the "strict observance") and the Mantuan Congregation were formally merged under one set of constitutions. The friars following Mantua conceded to Tourraine's Constitutions but insisted that the older form of the habit – namely their own – should be adopted. In a photograph of the period Titus Brandsma is shown in the habit of Tourraine as a novice; in all subsequent images he wears that of the newly styled ancient observance.

The French Revolution led to the suppression of the order, with the nuns dispersed into small groups who lived out of view in private houses. At the peak of the persecution, a Carmelite convent, now known as the Martyrs of Compiègne, were executed by guillotine. After the end of the disturbances, the wealthy heiress Camille de Soyécourt who became later the Carmelite Thérèse-Camille de l'Enfant-Jésus did much to restore the Carmelite life in France.

The Napoleonic secularisation at the beginning of the 19th century in Germany was a strong blow to the Carmelites. After Napoleon had occupied large parts of the Rhineland, almost all monasteries were dissolved after 1806; the 16 houses of the Lower German Province disappeared.

Although by the last decades of the 19th century there were approximately 200 Carmelite men throughout the world, the beginning of the 20th century saw a rebirth of the order. Existing provinces began re-founding provinces that had become defunct. The theological preparation of the Carmelites was strengthened, particularly with the foundation of St. Albert's College in Rome.

By 2001, the membership had increased to approximately 2,100 men in 25 provinces, 700 enclosed nuns in 70 monasteries, and 13 affiliated Congregations and Institutes. In addition, the Third Order of lay Carmelites count 25,000–30,000 members throughout the world. Provinces exist in Australia, Brazil, Britain, Canada, Chile, Croatia, Hungary, Germany, India, Indonesia, Ireland, Italy, Malta, the Netherlands, Poland, Singapore, Spain, Portugal and the United States. Delegations directly under the Prior General exist in Argentina, France, the Czech Republic, the Dominican Republic, Lebanon, the Philippines and Portugal.

Carmelite Missions exist in Bolivia, Burkina Faso, Cameroon, Colombia, India, Kenya, Lithuania, Mexico, Mozambique, Peru, Romania, Tanzania, Trinidad, Venezuela and Zimbabwe.

Monasteries of enclosed Carmelite nuns exist in Brazil, Canada, Croatia, Denmark, the Dominican Republic, Finland, Germany, Hungary, Indonesia, Iceland, Ireland, Israel, Italy, Kenya, the Netherlands, Australia, New Zealand (in Christchurch since 1933), Nicaragua, Norway, Peru, the Philippines, Spain, Sweden, Portugal, the United Kingdom and the United States. Hermit communities of either men or women exist in Brazil, France, Indonesia, Lebanon, Italy and the United States.

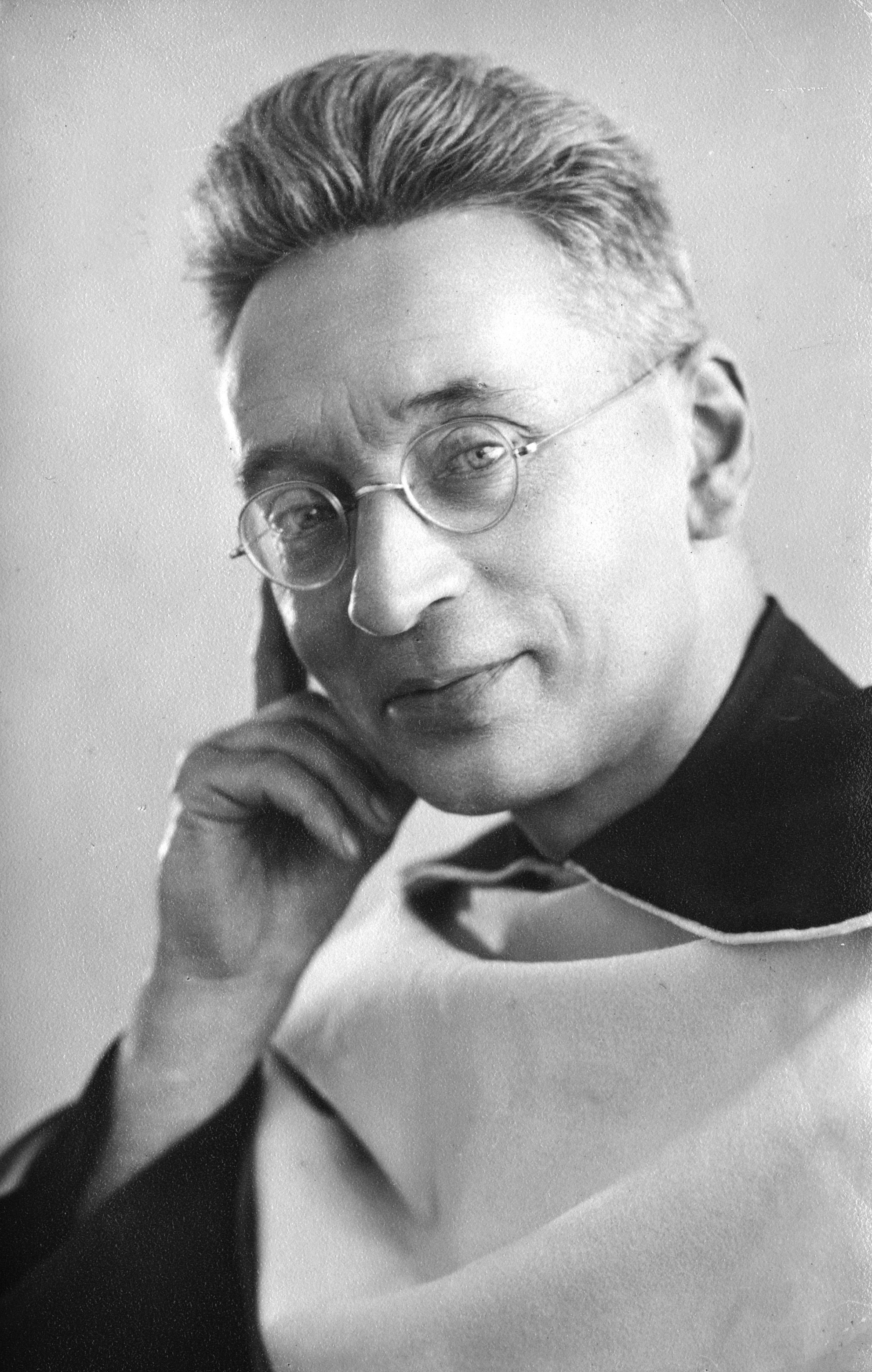
Titus Brandsma

The Discalced Carmelite Order built the priory of Elijah (1911) at the site of Elijah's epic contest with the prophets of Ba'al (1 Kings 18:20–40). The monastery is situated about 25 kilometers south of Haifa on the eastern side of the Carmel, and stands on the foundations of a series of earlier monasteries. The site is held sacred by Christians, Druze, Jews and Muslims; the name of the area is el-Muhraqa, an Arabic construction meaning "place of burning", and is a direct reference to the biblical account.

Several Carmelite saints have received significant attention in the 20th and 21st centuries. In 1970, Teresa of Avila became the first woman to be named a Doctor of the Church. In 1997, Thérèse of Lisieux became one of only four female Doctors of the Church, so named because of her famous teaching on the "way of confidence and love" set forth in her best-selling memoir, Story of a Soul. The Martyrs of Compiègne, murdered during the French Revolution, inspired a 1931 novella followed by a play, an opera, and a film. Notable 20th century Carmelites include Titus Brandsma, a Dutch scholar and writer who was killed in Dachau concentration camp because of his stance against Nazism; Teresa Benedicta of the Cross (née Edith Stein), a Jewish convert to Catholicism who was imprisoned and murdered at Auschwitz; and three nuns of Guadalajara who were martyred on 24 July 1936 by Spanish Republicans.

Raphael Kalinowski (1835–1907) was the first friar to be canonized in the order since co-founder John of the Cross. The writings and teachings of Brother Lawrence of the Resurrection, a Carmelite friar of the 17th century, continue as a spiritual classic under the title The Practice of the Presence of God. Other non-religious (i.e., non-vowed monastic) great figures include George Preca, a Maltese priest and Carmelite Tertiary. The Feast of All Carmelite Saints and Blesseds is celebrated on 14 November.

== Carmelite spirituality ==
=== Habit and scapular ===
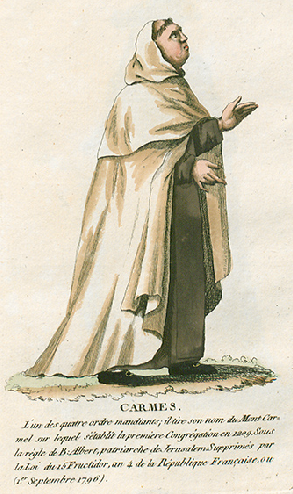
Carmelite of the Ancient Observance

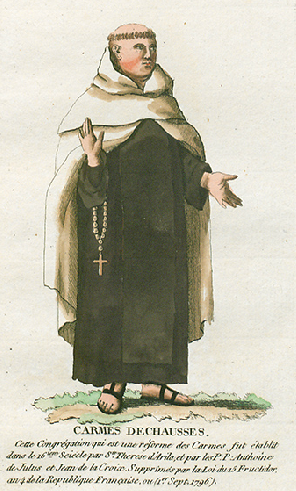
Discalced Carmelite

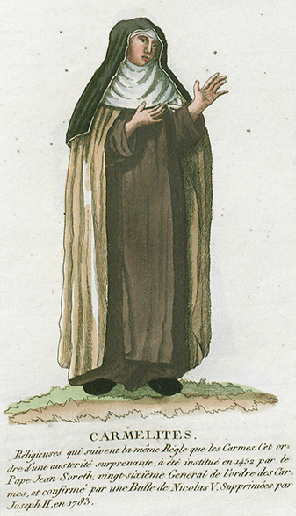
Carmelite nun of the Ancient Observance

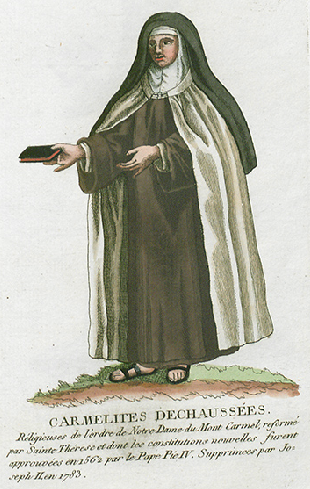
Discalced Carmelite nun

In 1287, the original way of life of the order was changed to conform to that of the mendicant orders on the initiative of Simon Stock and at the command of Pope Innocent IV. Their former habit of a mantle with black and white or brown and white stripes – the black or brown stripes representing the scorches the mantle of Elijah received from the fiery chariot as it fell from his shoulders – was discarded. They wore the same habit as the Dominicans, except that the cloak was white. They also borrowed much from the Dominican and Franciscan constitutions. Their distinctive garment was a scapular of two strips of dark cloth, worn on the breast and back, and fastened at the shoulders. Tradition holds that this was given to Simon Stock by the Blessed Virgin Mary, who appeared to him and promised that all who wore it with faith and piety and who died clothed in it would be saved. There arose a sodality of the scapular, which affiliated a large number of laymen with the Carmelites.

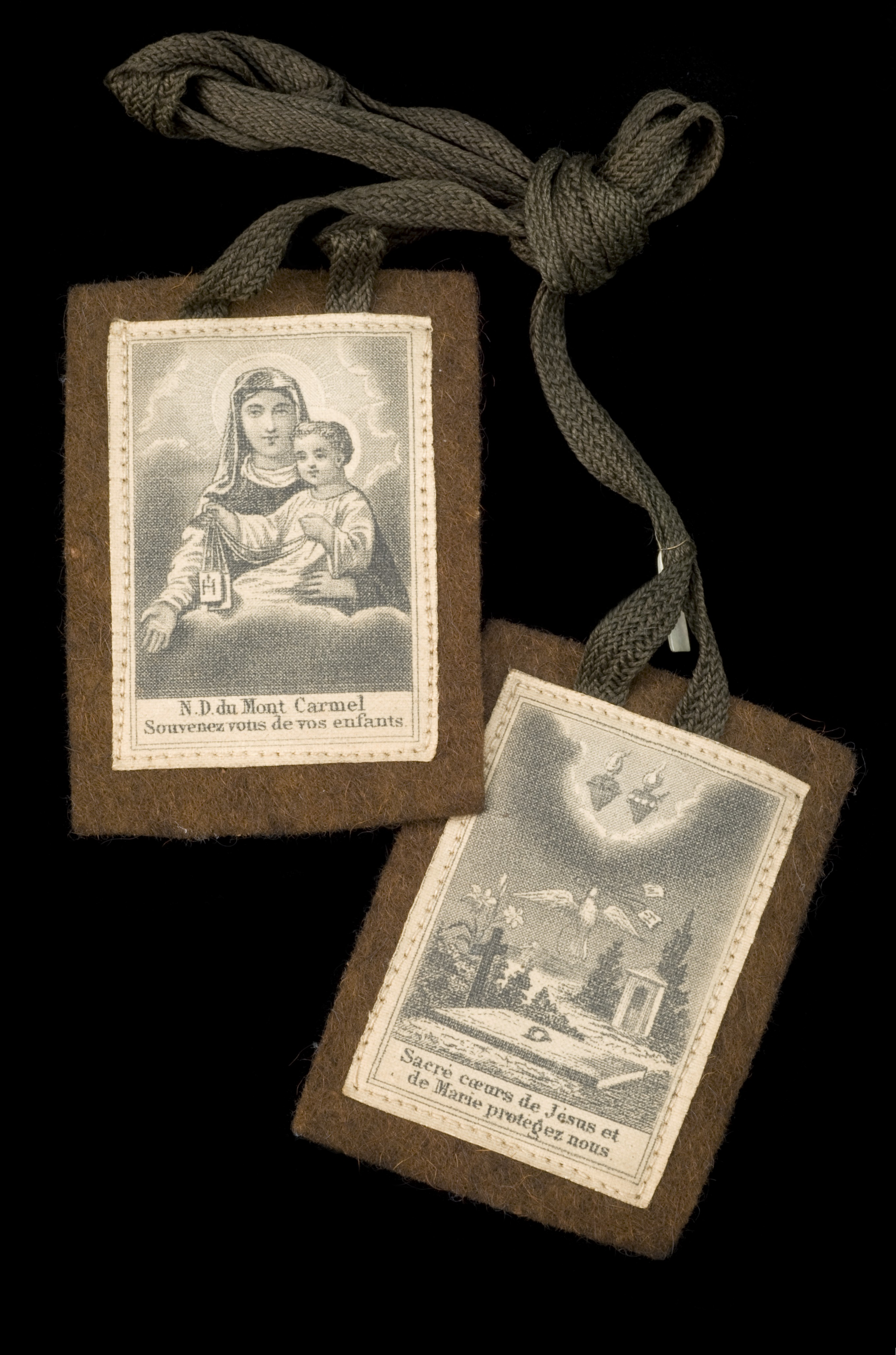
Brown Scapular.

A miniature version of the Carmelite scapular is popular among Catholics and is one of the most popular devotions in the church. Wearers usually believe that if they faithfully wear the Carmelite scapular (also called "the brown scapular" or simply "the scapular") and die in a state of grace, they will be saved from eternal torment. Catholics who decide to wear the scapular are usually enrolled by a priest, and some choose to enter the Scapular Confraternity. The Lay Carmelites of the Third Order of Our Lady of Mount Carmel wear a scapular which is smaller than the shortened scapular worn by some Carmelite religious for sleeping, but still larger than the devotional scapulars.

=== Visions and devotions ===
Among the various Catholic orders, Carmelite nuns have had a proportionally high ratio of visions of Jesus and Mary and have been responsible for key Catholic devotions.

From the time of her clothing in the Carmelite religious habit (1583) until her death (1607), Mary Magdalene de' Pazzi is said to have had a series of raptures and ecstasies.

- First, these raptures sometimes seized upon her whole being with such force as to compel her to rapid motion (e.g. towards some sacred object).
- Secondly, she was frequently able, whilst in ecstasy, to carry on working e.g., embroidery, painting, with perfect composure and efficiency.
- Thirdly, during these raptures Mary Magdalene de' Pazzi gave utterance to maxims of Divine Love, and to counsels of perfection for souls. These were preserved by her companions, who (unknown to her) wrote them down.

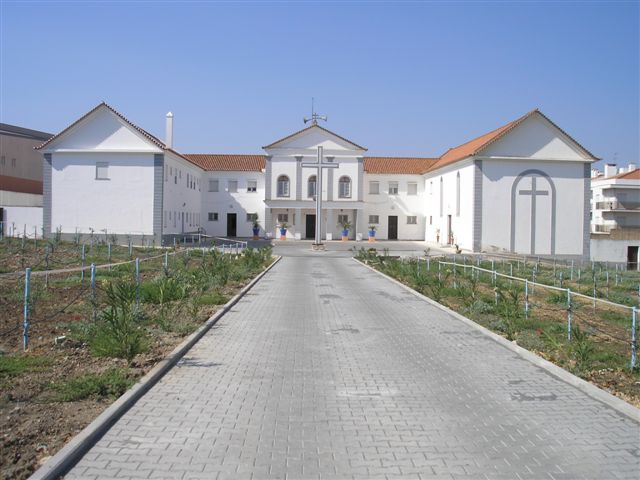
The Carmel of Beja, in Portugal

In the Carmelite convent of Beja, in Portugal, two Carmelite nuns of the Ancient Observance reported several apparitions and mystical revelations throughout their life: Mariana of the Purification received numerous apparitions of the Child Jesus and her body was found incorrupt after her death; Maria Perpétua da Luz wrote 60 books with messages from heaven; both religious died with the odor of sanctity.

In the 19th century, another Carmelite nun, Thérèse of Lisieux, was instrumental in spreading devotion to the Holy Face throughout France in the 1890s with her many poems and prayers. Eventually Pope Pius XII approved the devotion in 1958 and declared the Feast of the Holy Face of Jesus as Shrove Tuesday (the day before Ash Wednesday) for all Catholics. Therese of Lisieux emerged as one of the most popular saints for Catholics in the 20th century, and a statue of her can be found in many European and North American Catholic churches built prior to the Second Vatican Council (after which the number of statues tended to be reduced when churches were built).

In the 20th century, in the last apparition of the Blessed Virgin Mary in Fátima, Portugal, Sister Lúcia, one of the most famous visionaries of Our Lady, said that the Virgin appeared to her as Our Lady of Mount Carmel (holding the Brown Scapular). Many years after, Lúcia became a Carmelite nun. When Lúcia was asked in an interview why the Blessed Virgin appeared as Our Lady of Mount Carmel in her last apparition, she replied: "Because Our Lady wants all to wear the Scapular... The reason for this", she explained, "is that the Scapular is our sign of consecration to the Immaculate Heart of Mary". When asked if the Brown Scapular is as necessary to the fulfillment of Our Lady's requests as the rosary, Lúcia answered: "The Scapular and the Rosary are inseparable".

Many Carmelites have been canonized by the Catholic Church as saints. The Feast of All Carmelite Saints is celebrated on 14 November. The Commemoration of All the Departed of the Carmelite Order occurs on 15 November.

== See also ==
- Enclosed religious orders
- Dialogues of the Carmelites (an opera by Francis Poulenc)
- Ipswich Whitefriars
- Anglican religious order § Carmelite orders
- List of Carmelite saints
- List of Carmelite saints and beatified people
- Former Carmelite Convent at Nantes
