= Francisco Palau =

Catalan Discalced Carmelite priest (1811–1872)

Blessed Francisco Palau y Quer OCD
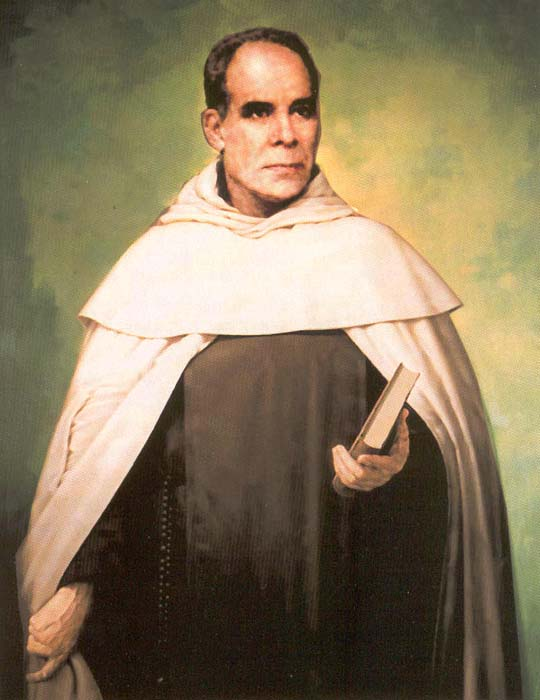
- Born: 29 December 1811; Aitona, Lleida, Catalonia, Spain
- Died: 20 March 1872 (aged 60); Tarragona, Catalonia, Spain
- Venerated in: Roman Catholic Church
- Beatified: 24 April 1988, St. Peter's Basilica, Vatican City by Pope John Paul II
- Feast: March 20 (November 7 in the Carmelite Calendar)

Francisco Palau y Quer, OCD (Catalan: Francesc Palau i Quer; religious name Francisco of Jesus, Mary and Joseph, 29 December 1811 – 20 March 1872) was a Catalan Discalced Carmelite priest.

Growing up in the chaos of the Peninsular War in Spain, he followed both the life of a hermit and of a missionary preacher in the rural regions of Catalonia. He founded the School of Virtue, which was a model of catechetical teaching for adults, in Barcelona. In 1860 he founded a Carmelite Third Order congregation for both men and women, in the Balearic Islands. The legacy of this foundation is carried on by two religious congregations for women who serve throughout the world.

Working from his tradition of Carmelite spirituality, Palau tried to promote the need of basing the spiritual life on recognizing and returning God's love, as opposed to the rationalist doctrines of the theology of his day. He was beatified in 1988. One of his spiritual followers was his great-niece, Teresa of Jesus Jornet, who founded a religious congregation of Carmelite sisters dedicated to caring for the poor aged. She is honored as a saint.

== Early life ==
He was born on 29 December 1811 in Aitona, Lerida, the 7th of the nine children of Joseph Palau and Maria Antònia Quer, who were fervent royalists and devoted Catholics. They were a humble farming family who would gather together to pray the rosary after their day's labors. He was baptized that same day in keeping with local custom. He was born into a period of widespread hunger and chaos due to the devastation wrought by the French invasion of Spain, which had reached the region the previous year.

The entire Palau family was active in the parish life and fervent in the reception of the sacraments. The father and all the children were members of the parish choir. Francisco initially studied at the town school.

At the age of 14, Palau decided to become a priest. Through the help of his sister Rosa, he pursued higher education for this goal in the City of Lleida. He was enrolled in the diocesan seminary of that city in October 1828, where he studied philosophy and theology. For four years he was granted a porcionista scholarship, which meant he was given full tuition as well as room and board.

In the course of his seminary studies, Palau came to know the Discalced Carmelite friars. In 1832 he relinquished his scholarship to enter that Order.

== Discalced Carmelite friar ==
Palau entered the Carmelite Priory of St. Joseph in Barcelona on 23 October 1832, and on the following 14 November he was given the religious habit of the Order and the religious name Francisco of Jesus, Mary and Joseph. He professed solemn religious vows in the Discalced Carmelite Order on 15 November 1833. This was at a time when religious persecution was beginning in Spain as a result of the First Carlist War. He was aware of the situation but courageous, and he never retracted his option. He continued his studies of theology at the Barcelona priory.

On 25 July 1835, Barcelona succumbed to rioting, which included the burning of convents and monasteries. St. Joseph Priory was one of those burned down. Dragged from the house by the revolutionary forces, he was arrested by them.

=== Hermit and missionary ===
The Spanish government abolished religious communities at that point and Palau continued his life of asceticism in his hometown, where he alternated between solitude and apostolic activities. At the time he was still a deacon, but he maintained contact with his Provincial Prior, who prepared him at a distance for ordination as a priest. This was done by the Bishop of Barbastro on 2 April 1836. Still unable to live in community, his first charge in his ministry was as an itinerant preacher.

In 1837, the city of Berga became the center of the Carlist forces and Palau settled there. Due both to his popularity and conflict with Church authorities, however, the government there briefly denied him a license to hear confessions and conduct religious services. The young priest began to wander the rural regions of Catalonia and Aragon, preaching the faith and hoping to restore enthusiasm for the Catholic faith among the local populace. He would also spend periods of solitude living in the caves of the region, in the pattern of the Desert Fathers. In 1840 his efforts caused him to be named an Apostolic Missionary in the various dioceses of the region.

=== Exile ===
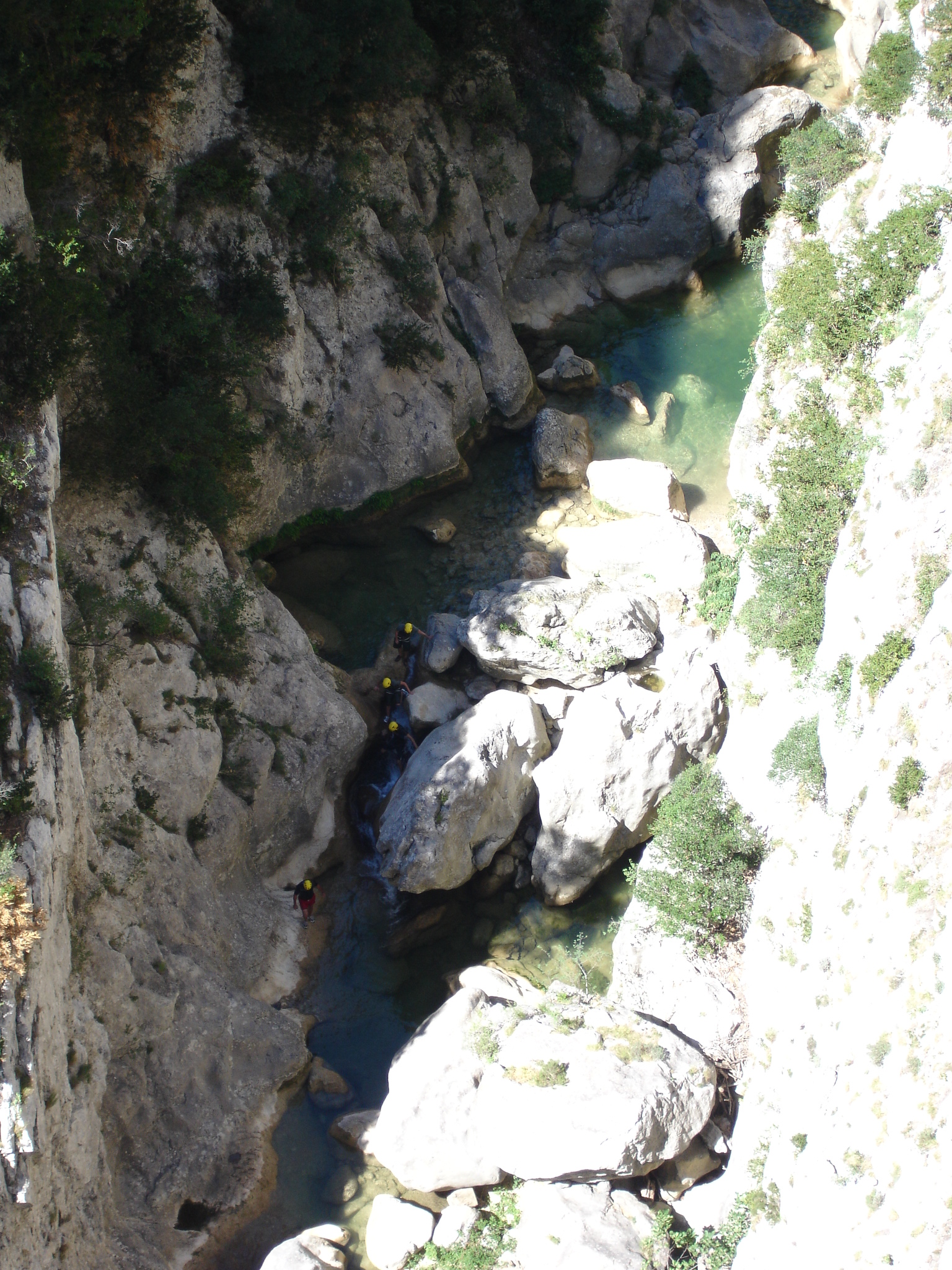
The Gorge of Galamus in France, where Francesc Palau spent his early days in exile

By July 1840 the royalist forces in Berga had been overwhelmed by their opponents. Palau felt that his religious activities would mark him with the Liberal authorities, so on 21 July he decided to cross the Pyrenees to live in exile in France.

Palau initially settled in Perpignan, later moving to a cave in the Gorge of Galamus, near Lesquerde, where he lived until 1842. He then moved to the region of Montauban, where he continued to live his solitary life in the Grotto of the Holy Cross in Livron, and then in Cambayrac. In 1843 he published his first work, La lucha del alma con Dios (The Soul Struggling with God). He began to inspire groups of men and women to live similar lifestyles of solitude, giving them direction in their quest. It was during this period that he came to know Juana Gratias, who later became a pivotal figure in his founding of congregations of Carmelite Tertiary Brothers and Sisters.

During Palau's time staying there, living in a cave situated 2 km from the village, his form of living shocking for many people, he drew the hostile attention of both the civil and ecclesiastical authorities, including the local bishop, Jean-Marie Doney. What had been a confusing oscillation from solitude to service and back to solitude again made sense for him when he recognized that the real Church is the congregation of humans in the whole Christ. God and neighbors together, is his Beloved.

Palau returned briefly to Spain in 1846. He stayed in his hometown of Aitona. He was soon accused by the local government authorities of upsetting the public order and returned to France the following year. He initially settled in Caylus, Tarn-et-Garonne, where he received a hostile reception. Expelled from there by the local government in December 1847, he returned to Cambayrac, where he again faced the hostility of Doney, which lasted even after his ultimate return to Spain.

Due to the outbreak of the French Revolution of 1848, Palau obtained a parcel of land in Saint-Paul-de-Fenouillet, near Perpignan, where he withdrew for greater solitude. The small religious community of hermits he had founded also faced the hostility which their founder had found, and the women's community was suppressed by Doney. In 1849, to defend himself, he wrote: La vida solitaria (The Solitary Life) and El solitario de Cantayrac (The Solitary of Cambayrac).

=== Return to Spain ===
Palau returned to Spain on 13 April 1851, after a Concordat had been signed between the Spanish government and the Holy See. One of its provisions, however, had been the continuation of the suppression of religious communities. Unable to live again with his Carmelite brothers, Palau made himself available to the Archbishop of Barcelona, Josep-Domènec Costa i Borràs, who appointed him as the spiritual director of the local seminarians.

At the same time Palau was assigned to the Parish Church of St. Augustine with its weekly Sunday school for adults. There he organized the School of Virtue (1851–1854) based on the virtues from the Catecismo de las Virtudes (Catechism of the Virtues) and with a program of 52 propositions on the current ideological movements. The Liberal government then in power protested against the school. As a consequence, it was closed and Palau was arrested and transported to the island of Ibiza.

==== Ibiza ====
Palau remained banished to that island for six years. He found an islet, a towering rock, El Vedra, near Ibiza and, needing solitude, he used to retire and pray there, seeking God's will. He established a hermitage in Es Cubells where he enthroned the image of Our Lady of the Virtues, establishing the first Marian sanctuary on the island, and promoting devotion to the Blessed Virgin Mary among the islanders. He preached popular missions and spread veneration of Our Lady wherever he went.

During 1860–1861, Palau reorganized the hermits of San Honorato de Randa in Mallorca and initiated the foundation of a Carmelite family – the Congregation – Third Order of Discalced Carmelites of the Congregation of Spain. He started to write Mis relaciones con la Iglesia (My Relations with the Church), a sort of autobiographical journal, partly written in the idyllic solitude of El Vedra, transmitting his experience of the Church conceived as God and neighbors.

=== Last years ===
In 1867 the Commissariat of Discalced Carmelite friars in Spain appointed Palau as the Director of the Discalced Carmelite tertiaries of the nation. In 1868 he initiated in Barcelona the weekly publication of El ermitaño (The Hermit). He assisted the sick and he practiced exorcism. He even created a project for a religious order dedicated exclusively to that ministry. In 1872 he wrote a Rule of Life and Constitutions for the members of the Discalced Carmelite Third Order.

While fully immersed in his apostolic and foundational work, in 1872 with an outbreak of typhus Palau's help was requested by the Sisters he had founded at the hospital they operated in Peralta de Calasanz, Huesca. He went there accompanied by Juana Gratia, arriving on 20 February. After the crisis had passed, he set off to return to Barcelona, but became ill on the road. On 10 March 1872 he was taken to Tarragona, the last of his foundations, where the illness developed into pneumonia. He died there ten days later at 60 years of age, assisted by the Sisters he had founded and two other Discalced friars.

With the opening of the cause for the beatification of Palau, on 13 December 1947, his remains were moved from the public cemetery in Tarragona to the chapel of the motherhouse of the Teresian Carmelite Missionaries whom he had founded. Francisco Palau was beatified by Pope John Paul II on 24 April 1988. His liturgical feast day is celebrated on November 7 by the Carmelite Order.

== Legacy ==
After the Spanish Civil War that ended in 1939, the Carmelite Tertiary Brothers who survived were incorporated into the Discalced Carmelite friars. The Sisters are now flourishing in two autonomous congregations, both headquartered in Rome: the Teresian Carmelite Missionaries, who serve in Europe, Africa, Asia and South America; and the Carmelite Missionaries, who serve in some 40 countries around world.

== Quotes ==
From Francisco Palau:

- "The voice of God leaves no emptiness in the soul, it fills her and does not doubt."
- "God's great work in man takes place in the Interior."
- "I will go where the glory of God calls me."

== Prayer through the intercession of the Blessed Francisco Palau ==
"Lord God, you chose Blessed Francisco Palau to proclaim to the whole world the mystery of the Church. He spent his life in spreading the Gospel among his brothers and sisters and in fostering among them a vivid awareness of their membership in the mystical body of Christ. Grant Oh Lord, that the honor which your church confers on him may help to make all men and women one in God's people and through his intercession give us the special grace which we now ask. Amen".

== See also ==
- Discalced Carmelites
- Carmelite Rule of St. Albert
- Book of the First Monks
- Constitutions of the Carmelite Order
- Carmelites
