= Hermits of the Most Blessed Virgin Mary of Mount Carmel =

Order of mendicant friars

- Abbreviation: Carmelite Hermits
- Type: Catholic religious order branch from OCarm
- Prior General: Fr. Míċéal O'Neill, OCarm
- Website: http://www.ocarm.org

The Hermits of the Most Blessed Virgin Mary of Mount Carmel is a branch of the Carmelite Order of the Ancient Observance, who originated as hermit monks and have been mendicant friars since the 13th century.

The male Carmelites of this branch of the order are not considered monastics as the cloistered Carmelite nuns are. However, Carmelite Hermits are new and separate communities of men and women living an enclosed contemplative life, inspired by the ancient Carmelite monastic life, under the authority of the Prior General of Carmelite Order (OCarm).

Our Lady of Mount Carmel is the principal patroness of Carmelites communities. Saint Elijah and Saint Elisha are the co-patrons.

== Hermit Communities under the Prior General (OCarm) authority ==
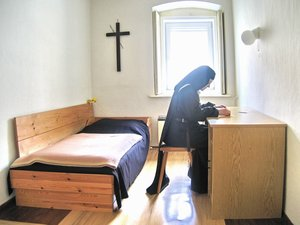
A Carmelite nun reading in the cell of her convent (a Carmel or Hermitage).

=== Male Communities ===
- Hermits of the Blessed Virgin Mary of Mount Carmel – Christoval, Texas
- Carmelite Hermits of the Blessed Virgin Mary – Lake Elmo, Minnesota

=== Female Communities ===
- Hermits of Our Lady of Mount Carmel – Chester, New Jersey
- Carmelite Hermits of Monteluro – Monteluro (Italy)
- Hermits of Our Lady of Mount Carmel – Siegburg (Germany)

== See also ==
- Carmelite Rule of Saint Albert
- Book of the First Monks
- Constitutions of the Carmelite Order
