= Lay Carmelites =

Third Order of Our Lady of Mount Carmel

Third Order of Our Lady of Mount Carmel
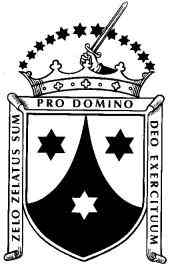
- Abbreviation: T.O.Carm
- Formation: 1476
- Type: Third Order
- General Secretariat for the laity: Fr. Luis José Maza Subero, O.Carm
- Website: https://ocarm.org/en/carmelites-around-the-world/lay-carmelites-third-order

The Third Order of Our Lady of Mount Carmel, also known as the Lay Carmelites, is a third order of the Carmelite Order of the Ancient Observance, established in 1476 by a bull of Pope Sixtus IV. It is an association of people who choose to live the Gospel in the spirit of the Carmelite Order and under its guidance. Its members are mainly lay people.

== History ==
Soon after the Order of Our Lady of Mount Carmel was established in Europe in the thirteenth century, lay persons, not bound by religious vows, seem to have attached themselves to it more or less closely. There is evidence of the existence of a "Confrairie Notre-Dame du Mont-Carmel" at Toulouse in 1273, and of a "Compagnia di Santa Maria del Carmino" at Bologna in 1280, but the exact nature of these bodies is uncertain owing to a lack of documents.

Somewhat later mention is frequently made of trade-guilds having their seat in churches of the order, members of which acted as their chaplains. Thus the master-bakers, innkeepers and pastry-cooks at Nîmes, the barbers and surgeons of the same town, who were also connected with the Dominicans, the goldsmiths at Avignon. Benefactors of the order received letters of fraternity with the right of participation in the privileges and good works of the friars. Others, under the name of bizzoche and mantellatoe, wore the habit and observed the rule, at Florence in 1308. Still others became recluses in the anchorages attached to Carmelite churches. Among the tertiaries not living in community were Blessed Louis Morbioli of Bologna (d. 1495).

The canonical institution of the third order dates from the middle of the fifteenth century, when a community of Beguines at Guelders sought affiliation to the order, and Blessed John Soreth, General of the Carmelites, obtained a Bull (7 October 1452) granting the superiors of his order the faculties enjoyed by the Hermits of Saint Augustine and the Dominicans of canonically establishing convents of "virgins, widows, beguines and mantellatae". Also Saint Nuno of Saint Mary had participated in the developing work of the carmelite third order. Further legislation took place in 1476 by the Bull Mare magnum privilegiorum, and under Pope Benedict XIII and his successors.

The rule observed by the tertiaries, whether living in the world or gathered into communities, was originally that of the friars with modifications as required by their status. Theodor Stratius, General of the Carmelites of the Ancient Observance, composed in 1635 a new rule, revised in 1678, which is still observed among tertiaries of the Calced and the Discalced Carmelites.

== Charism ==
The charism of Lay Carmelites is contemplative prayer, community, and ministry.

== Membership ==
Those who wish to be members of the Lay Carmelites must be practicing Catholics. They must not be members of any other Third Order or Secular Institute, except in special cases, and they must be at least 18 years of age. After a period of initial formation, candidates are accepted for profession. The term 'Lay Carmel' is somewhat problematic when describing the Secular/Third Orders because there are a number of ordained ministers (deacons, priests and bishops) who, while not lay people, are professed members of the Secular/Third Orders.

Apart from attending a monthly community meeting, Lay Carmelites wear the Brown Scapular of Our Lady of Mt. Carmel as an external sign of dedication to Mary, and of trust in her protection. They are expected to participate in the daily celebration of the Eucharist when possible, and should spend about one half-hour in meditation each day, reflecting on the Scriptures, Lectio Divina, or some other appropriate type of personal reflective prayer. The Lay Carmelite also prays the Liturgy of the Hours – Morning and Evening Prayer.

== Numbers and distribution ==
There are numerous corporations of tertiaries established in different countries, viz. two communities of tertiary brothers in Ireland (Drumcondra and Clondalkin near Dublin) in charge of an asylum for the blind and of a high-school for boys; eighteen communities of native priests in British India belonging partly to the Latin Church and partly to the Syro-Malabar Catholic Church; four houses of Brothers of Christian Education in Spain. Far more numerous are the communities of nuns, including twenty-three in India (both Latin and Syro-Malabar) for the education of native girls, and four convents in Syria in connection with the missions of the Order; two congregations of tertiaries in Spain with nineteen and forty-eight establishments respectively, and one unattached, for educational work. In Spain there are also tertiary nuns called "Carmelitas de la caridad" engaged in works of charity with 150 establishments. The Austrian congregation of nuns numbers twenty-seven houses, while the most recent branch, the Carmelite Tertiaries of the Sacred Heart, founded at Berlin towards the end of the last century for the care and education of orphans and neglected children, have spread rapidly through Germany, Holland, England, Switzerland, Italy, Austria, and Hungary, and have twenty houses. In Italy there are three different congregations with thirty-two convents. There are smaller branches of the tertiaries in South America with two houses at Santiago, Chile, in Switzerland with four convents, and in England with one.

In Britain, the Third Order experienced a particular growth following the return of the Carmelite friars to Britain in the 1920s. There are around 500 professed members of the Carmelite Third Order Secular in Britain.

As of 2012, the Ontario and Northwestern New York Region of the Carmelite Province of the Most Pure Heart of Mary (PCM) had eleven communities with 194 active members.

Twenty-six countries were represented at the 2006 International Congress of Lay Carmelites.

== See also ==
- Our Lady of Mount Carmel
- Carmelite Rule of St. Albert
- Carmelite Rite
- Constitutions of the Carmelite Order
- Secular Order of Discalced Carmelites
- Book of the First Monks
