= Mater Carmeli School =

Roman Catholic school in Quezon City, Philippines

Mater Carmeli School of Novaliches, Quezon City, Inc.

Location
- Fr. Francisco Palau St., Sacred Heart Village, Novaliches, Quezon City, Metro Manila; Philippines; 14°44′20.31″N 121°4′21.03″E

Information
- Type: Private, Catholic, Coeducational
- Motto: Contemplare, Amare, Servire Ecclesiam ("Contemplate, Love, Serve the Church")
- Established: June 1986; 40 years ago
- Rector: Sr. Flordeliza S. Presquito, CM
- Principal: Mrs. Rosana G. Cruda (Grade School); Mrs. Mary Ann A. Caligan (JHS & SHS)
- Other administrators: Mr. Janrey C. Tiña – High School Academic Affairs Coordinator; Mrs. Jocyl C. Panes – Grade School Academic Affairs Coordinator; Mrs. Mayette Maming – Grade School Discipline Coordinator; Mrs. Jocelyn Salcedo – Junior High School Discipline Coordinator; Ms. Eufemia Superio – Senior High School Discipline & Academic Affairs Coordinator; Mr. Levy P. Pedroso – Student Activities Coordinator; Mr. Rudolfo M. Buenaventura – Student Affairs Coordinator
- Colors: Brown; Yellow
- Nickname: Carmelians
- Newspaper: The Carmelian (English); Ang Munting Simbahan (Filipino)
- Hymn: Dear Sweet Carmeli
- Website: mcsnova.edu.ph

Mater Carmeli School of Novaliches, Quezon City, Inc. (commonly known as Mater Carmeli School of Novaliches) is a private Catholic educational institution located in Sacred Heart Village, Novaliches, Quezon City, Philippines. Established in June 1986 by the Carmelite Missionaries, its Latin name, Mater Carmeli ("Mother of Carmel"), refers to Our Lady of Mount Carmel, the school's patroness. Mater Carmeli School offers Kindergarten, elementary, junior high school, and senior high school programs.

== History ==
=== Establishment ===
Mater Carmeli School of Novaliches, located in Sacred Heart Village, Novaliches, Quezon City, is administered by the Carmelite Missionaries of the Province of Fr. Francisco Palau, Philippines. It was formally established in 1986 on land adjacent to the provincial Novitiate House.

When the Novitiate was transferred to Sacred Heart Village in 1982, the missionaries initially had no plans to open a school, seeking instead a quiet environment suitable for religious formation. However, the building was often mistaken for a school, and residents of the village began requesting that an educational institution be founded.

The Sacred Heart Village Homeowners Association eventually submitted a formal appeal to the Provincial Council, which was approved by the General Council in Rome. Following a feasibility study, Mater Carmeli School of Novaliches was founded.

=== Early years & Expansion ===
The school began operations in June 1986 with 20 kindergarten pupils under the care of Sr. Flordeliza Presquito, CM, Sr. Assumption Villalba, CM, and Reynaldo Duremdes (janitor). Classes were initially held in a temporary two-room building while construction of the main campus progressed. The first permanent buildings—named after Our Lady of Mount Carmel, St. Teresa of Avila, Blessed Francisco Palau, and the late school engineer Leonardo Sinon—were completed in the following years. By 1991, the institution had expanded to offer complete grade school levels, followed by the high school department in 1995.

In response to the Enhanced Basic Education Act of 2013 (RA 10533), the school opened its Senior High School department in 2016. A new building dedicated to St. Thérèse of the Child Jesus was constructed in 2015 to house this program. The Senior High School initially offered the STEM strand, later expanding to include HUMSS in 2017 and ABM in 2018.

== Information ==
=== Curriculum ===
The school follows the Enhanced Basic Education Curriculum (K to 12) by the DepEd, in compliance with Republic Act 10533. In 2016, the school offered the Science, Technology, Engineering and Mathematics (STEM) strand under the Academic Track. In 2017, the school started to offer the Humanities and Social Sciences (HUMSS) strand. Traditionally, for every year, for every grade there would be ~8 Honors, a Salutatorian and a Valedictorian, but starting SY 2017-1018 there would be the 'with Honors', 'with High Honors' and 'with Highest Honors'.

=== Admission of students ===
Students must pass the entrance examination and the interview conducted by the Guidance Counselor and by the Principal for grade school and high school, and by the Pre-school coordinator for Kindergarten and Preparatory school.

=== Religious formation ===
School recollections for students are held once during the year. A two-day retreat is provided to graduating students and their parents, and for the faculty and non-teaching staff. This is held at the Carmelite Missionaries Center for Spirituality at Tagaytay.

There is a monthly celebration of the Sacraments, such as grade/year level celebration of the Eucharist and the Sacrament of Reconciliation.

Faculty, non-teaching staff, and service operators have their regular spiritual formation. They enter into spiritual exercises at the start of the school year. Advent and Lenten seasons are given inputs for their spiritual growth. They are sustained by their weekly "faith sharing" in their respective organized BECs (Basic Ecclesial Communities).

Parents are invited to the two-day parenting recollection-seminar in their child respective grade/year level called Hakbang Tungo sa Mabisang Pamamaraan ng Pagkamagulang.

=== School Quality ===
The sections of each level are all named after Values (K-Gr. 10) / People (Gr. 11 & 12). The sections do have banners of the School's Values, a cross and an altar. Each section has ~40 students per year.

== Administrative Staff ==
=== Grade School Principal ===
- Sr. Dolores S. Buot (+), CM
- Sr. Flordeliza S. Presquito, CM
- Sr. Lourdes B. Dizon, CM
- Sr. Ma. Adelaida C. Larupay, CM
- Mrs. Ma. Erlinda M. Cachero(+)
- Sr. Ma. Adelaida C. Larupay, CM
- Sr. Lourdes B. Dizon, CM
- Mr. Francisco B. Tabifranca Jr.
- Mrs. Rosana G. Cruda

=== High School Principal ===
- Sr. Lourdes B. Dizon, CM
- Sr. Ma. Adelaida C. Larupay, CM
- Sr. Carmelita C. Denoyo, CM
- Mr. Francisco B. Tabifranca Jr.
- Ms. Rosemarie G. Hizon (+)
- Mr. Francisco B. Tabifranca Jr.
- Mrs. Mary Ann A. Caligan

=== Senior High School Principal ===
- Mrs. Noreen M. Morales
- Mrs. Mary Ann A. Caligan

== Sister schools ==
Mater Carmeli School is a Catholic school owned by the Carmelite Missionaries. Sister schools are located in the following areas:

- Mater Carmeli School, D. Tuazon
  - Location: D. Tuazon Ave., Quezon City
  - Levels Offered: Kinder to Grade 6
- Mater Carmeli School, Dingle
  - Location: Dingle, Iloilo
  - Levels Offered: Nursery, Kinder, Prep, Grade School and High School
- Holy Cross of Caburan
  - Location: Caburan, Davao del Sur

The Foundation Day of the school is celebrated in the first week of November. The culmination of the yearly celebrations is on November 7 in commemoration of the feast day of Blessed Francisco Palau, the school's father founder.
