= Henri Nouwen bibliography =

Below is a bibliography of published works written by Dutch-born Catholic priest Henri Nouwen. The works are listed under each category by year of publication. This includes 42 books, four of which were published posthumously, along with 51 articles and 4 chapters which are lists in process. Also listed below are 31 of the forewords, introductions, and afterwords which he wrote for others' works. Finally, the list of 32 readers and compilations continues to grow as material from his work is incorporated into new publications.

== Books by Nouwen ==
- Intimacy: Pastoral Psychological Essays (1st ed.). Notre Dame, Indiana: Fides. 1969. OCLC 301590220.
- Creative Ministry (1st ed.). Garden City, N.Y.: Doubleday. 1971. OCLC 152930.
- Pray to Live. Thomas Merton: Contemplative Critic (1st ed.). Notre Dame, Ind.: Fides Publishers. 1972 [Published in Dutch 1970]. ISBN 978-0-8190-0580-9. OCLC 488271.
- With Open Hands (1st ed.). Notre Dame, Ind.: Ave Maria Press. 1972 [Published in Dutch 1971]. ISBN 978-0-87793-040-2. OCLC 12152509.
- The Wounded Healer: Ministry in Contemporary Society (1st ed.). Garden City, N.Y.: Doubleday. 1972. ISBN 978-0-385-02856-1. OCLC 508647.
- Henri J. M. Nouwen; Walter J. Gaffney (1974). Aging: The Fulfillment of Life (1st ed.). Garden City, N.Y.: Doubleday. ISBN 978-0-385-00918-8. OCLC 867917.
- Out of Solitude: Three Meditations on the Christian Life (1st ed.). Notre Dame, Ind.: Ave. Maria Press. 1974. ISBN 978-0-87793-072-3. OCLC 744493807.
- Reaching Out: Three Movements of the Spiritual Life (1st ed.). Garden City, N.Y.: Doubleday. 1975. ISBN 978-0-385-03212-4. OCLC 1301440.
- Genesee Diary: Report from a Trappist Monastery (1st ed.). Garden City, N.Y.: Doubleday. 1976. ISBN 978-0-385-11368-7. OCLC 2020144.
- The Living Reminder: Service and Prayer in Memory of Jesus Christ (1st ed.). New York: Seabury Press. 1977. ISBN 978-0-86683-915-0. OCLC 2655621.
- Clowning in Rome: Reflections on Solitude, Celibacy, Prayer, and Contemplation (1st ed.). Garden City, N.Y.: Image Books. 1979. ISBN 978-0-385-15129-0. OCLC 4641701.
- In Memoriam (1st ed.). Notre Dame, Ind.: Ave Maria Press. 1980. ISBN 978-0-87793-197-3. OCLC 6435802.
- Making All Things New: An Invitation to the Spiritual Life (1st ed.). San Francisco: Harper & Row. 1981. ISBN 978-0-06-066326-1. OCLC 7197150.
- The Way of the Heart: Desert Spirituality and Contemporary Ministry (1st ed.). New York: Seabury Press. 1981. ISBN 978-0-8164-0479-7. OCLC 6735240.
- A Cry For Mercy: Prayers from the Genesee (1st ed.). Garden City, N.Y.: Doubleday. 1981. ISBN 978-0-385-17507-4. OCLC 7247617.
- Henri J. M. Nouwen; Donald P. McNeill; Douglas A. Morrison (1982). Compassion: A Reflection on the Christian Life (1st ed.). Garden City, N.Y.: Doubleday. ISBN 978-0-385-17699-6. OCLC 7305940.
- A Letter of Consolation (1st ed.). San Francisco: Harper & Row. 1982. ISBN 978-0-06-066327-8. OCLC 8221426.
- Gracias! A Latin American Journal (1st ed.). San Francisco: Harper & Row. 1983. ISBN 978-0-06-066318-6. OCLC 9194907.
- Love in a Fearful Land: A Guatemalan Story (1st ed.). Notre Dame, IN: Ave Maria Press. 1985. ISBN 978-0-87793-294-9. OCLC 394993740.
- Lifesigns: Intimacy, Fecundity and Ecstasy in Christian Perspective (1st ed.). Garden City. N.Y.: Doubleday. 1986. ISBN 978-0-385-23627-0. OCLC 13332921.
- Letters to Marc About Jesus: Spiritual Living in a Material World (1st ed.). San Francisco: Harper & Row. 1988 [Published in Dutch 1987]. ISBN 978-0-06-066315-5. OCLC 18164701.
- Behold the Beauty of the Lord: Praying With Icons (1st ed.). Notre Dame, Ind.: Ave Maria Press. 1987. ISBN 978-0-87793-356-4. OCLC 15212809.
- The Road to Daybreak: A Spiritual Journey (1st ed.). New York: Doubleday. 1988. OCLC 17478431.
- In the Name of Jesus: Reflections on Christian Leadership (1st ed.). New York: Crossroad. 1989. ISBN 978-0-8245-1259-0. OCLC 18778865.
- Heart Speaks to Heart: Three Prayers to Jesus (1st ed.). Notre Dame, Ind.: Ave Maria Press. 1989. ISBN 978-0-87793-393-9. OCLC 19650528.
- Henri J. M. Nouwen (1990). Walk with Jesus: Stations of the Cross. Maryknoll, N.Y.: Orbis Books. ISBN 978-0-88344-666-9. OCLC 20490822.
- Beyond the Mirror: Reflections on Death and Life (1st ed.). New York: Crossroad. 1990. ISBN 978-0-8245-1007-7. OCLC 20635339.
- Show Me the Way: Readings for Each Day of Lent (1st ed.). New York: Crossroad. 1992. ISBN 978-0-8245-1029-9. OCLC 24543448.
- Life of the Beloved: Spiritual Living in a Secular World. New York: Crossroad. 1992. ISBN 978-0-8245-1184-5. OCLC 25832267.
- The Return of the Prodigal Son: A Meditation on Fathers, Brothers and Sons (1st ed.). London: Darton, Longman & Todd. 1992. ISBN 978-0-232-52002-6. OCLC 59979594.
- Jesus & Mary: Finding Our Sacred Center (1st ed.). Cincinnati, OH: St. Anthony Messenger Press. 1993. ISBN 978-0-86716-189-2. OCLC 30302268.
- Our Greatest Gift: A Meditation on Dying and Caring (1st ed.). San Francisco, Calif.: Harper San Francisco. 1994. ISBN 978-0-06-066355-1. OCLC 28799627.
- Here and Now: Living in the Spirit (1st ed.). New York: Crossroad. 1994. ISBN 978-0-8245-1409-9. OCLC 30593221.
- With Burning Hearts: A Meditation on the Eucharistic Life (1st ed.). Maryknoll, N.Y.: Orbis Books. 1994. ISBN 978-0-88344-984-4. OCLC 30154626.
- The Path of Power (1st ed.). New York: Crossroad. 1995. ISBN 978-0-8245-2003-8. OCLC 31934103.
- The Path of Waiting (1st ed.). New York: Crossroad. 1995. ISBN 978-0-8245-2000-7. OCLC 31934098.
- The Path of Freedom (1st ed.). New York: Crossroad. 1995. ISBN 978-0-8245-2001-4. OCLC 31969500.
- The Path of Peace (1st ed.). New York: Crossroad. 1995. ISBN 978-0-8245-2002-1. OCLC 1036788025.
- The Inner Voice of Love: Journey Through Anguish to Freedom (1st ed.). New York: Doubleday. 1996. ISBN 978-0-385-48348-3. OCLC 34651338.
- Can You Drink the Cup? (1st ed.). Notre Dame, Ind.: Ave. Maria Press. 1996. ISBN 978-0-87793-581-0. OCLC 34973848.

=== Posthumous releases ===
- Adam: God's Beloved (1st ed.). Maryknoll, N.Y.: Orbis Books. 1997. ISBN 978-1-57075-994-9. OCLC 37432875.
- Bread for the Journey: A Daybook of Wisdom and Faith (1st ed.). San Francisco: Harper San Francisco. 1997. ISBN 978-0-06-066359-9. OCLC 34926780.
- Sabbatical Journey: The Diary of His Final Year. New York: Crossroad. 1998. ISBN 978-0-8245-1878-3. OCLC 39261954.
- De Vinck, Christopher, ed. (1999). Nouwen Then: Personal Reflections on Henri (1st ed.). Zondervan Publishing Company.
- Earnshaw, Gabrielle, ed. (2016). Love, Henri: letters on the spiritual life. New York: Convergent. ISBN 978-1-101-90635-4. OCLC 934676656.

== Chapters ==
- Lauer, Eugene F.; Mlecko, Joel, eds. (1982). "The Family". A Christian Understanding of the Human Person: Basic Readings. New York: Paulist Press. ISBN 978-0-8091-2433-6. OCLC 8708612.
- Johanson, Gregory J, ed. (1984). "Insight and Availability". Feed my Sheep: Sermons on Contemporary Issues in Pastoral Care. New York: Paulist Press. OCLC 10865217.

== Articles ==
- Nouwen, Henri J. M. (1968). "Anton T. Boisen and Theology Through Living Human Documents". Pastoral Psychology. 19 (September): 49–63. doi:10.1007/BF01788381. S2CID 144600144.
- Nouwen, Henri J. M. (1969). "Training for Campus Ministry". Pastoral Psychology. 20 (March): 27–38. doi:10.1007/BF01778061. S2CID 143174251.
- "Generation Without Fathers". Commonweal: 287. June 12, 1970.
- "Finding the Friendly Space". The Episcopalian: 8–10, 44. June 1973.
- "Compassion: Solidarity, Consolation and Comfort". America. 134 (10): 195. March 13, 1976. Archived from the original on June 30, 2015.
- "The Gift of Solitude". Faith/At/Work. 89: 28–29. April 1976.
- "Drawing Closer to God and Man". The Sign: 10–16. May 1976.
- "Solitude and Intimacy in the Family". A.D. Correspondence: 10–16. July 31, 1976.
- "Called to be Hosts". Faith/At/Work. 89: 30–31. September 1976.
- "Living the Questions: The Spirituality of the Religion Teacher". Union Seminary Quarterly Review. 32 (Fall): 17–24. 1976.
- "Reflections on Political Ministry". Network Quarterly. 4 (4): A1 – A2. Fall 1976.
- "Disappearing form the World". The Sign: 5–7. November 1976.
- "Compassion: the Core of Spiritual Leadership". Worship. 51: 11–23. January 1977.
- "What Do You Know by Heart?". Sojourners. 6: 14–16. August 1977.
- "Compassion in a Callous World". Sojourners. 6: 15–18. September 1977.
- "Not Without Confrontation". Sojourners. 6: 9. October 1977.
- "The Authority of Suffering". Sojourners. 6: 10. November 1977.
- "Five Faculty Views [on the University's Mission]". Yale University's Journal: 10–11. November 1977.
- "Voluntary Displacement". Sojourners. 6: 15. December 1977.
- "The Poverty of 'No Control'". Sojourners. 7: 11. January 1978.
- "Solitude and Community". Worship. 52: 13–23. January 1978.
- "The Faces of Community". The Catholic Worker. 52: 3, 7. March–April 1978.
- with Donald McNeill and Douglas Morrison (March 1978). "The Parish as a Community of Compassion: A Style of Pastoral Leadership". St. Luke's Journal of Theology. 21: 89–101.
- "Anchored in God Through Prayer". Sojourners. 7: 20–21. April 1978.
- "Contemplation and Ministry". Sojourners. 7: 9–12. June 1978.
- Nouwen, Henri J. M. (1978). "Celibacy". Pastoral Psychology. 27 (2): 79. doi:10.1007/BF01026771. S2CID 241138081.
- "The Hell of Mercy: Confronting Merton's Spirituality". Sojourners. 7: 19. December 1978.
- "Solitude: The Inner Fabric of Christian Community". Sojourners. 8: 20–23. March 1979.
- "Letting Go of All Things: A Response to "The Work of Prayer"". Sojourners. 8: 5–6. May 1979.
- "The Monk and the Cripple: Toward a Spirituality of Ministry". America. 142. March 15, 1980.
- "The Desert Counsel to Flee the World: Solitude and Contemporary Ministry". Sojourners. 9: 14–18. June 1980.
- "Silence, The Portable Cell: The Word Which Creates Communion". Sojourners. 9: 22–26. July 1980.
- "Descend with the Mind into the Heart: The Call to Unceasing Prayer". Sojourners. 9: 20–24. August 1980.
- "As I See It: Our God Is a God Who Cares". Church Leaders Bulletin for Laity and Clergy: 1–5. Fall 1980.
- "What is the Goal of Spiritual Growth? Moving from Absurdity to Obedience". Faith/At/Work. 93: 7. September–October 1980.
- "Spiritual Direction". Reflection: 7–8. January 1981.
- "Encounter in Solitude". Sign: 10–17. February 1981.
- "Temptation: The Pull Toward Upward Mobility". Sojourners. 10: 25–27. July 1981.
- "A Self-Emptied Heart: The Disciplines of Spiritual Formation". Sojourners. 10: 20–22. August 1981.
- "Spiritual Direction". Worship. 55: 399–404. September 1981.
- "Where You Would Not Rather Go". The Princeton Seminary Bulletin. 3: 237–239. 1982. Archived from the original on July 15, 2015.
- "Prayer and Peacemaking". Catholic Agitator: 4–6. December 1982.
- "Reflections of Fr. Henri Nouwen After a Month in Nicaragua". Mercy on Your People, Lord: 1–2. July 1983.
- "Henri Nouwen's Plea for Nicaragua". National Catholic Reporter: 9–11. August 26, 1983.
- "We Drink from Our Own Wells". America. 149: 205–208. October 15, 1983.
- "Christ of the Americas". America. 150: 293–302. April 21, 1984.
- "Creating True Intimacy: Solidarity Among the People of God". Sojourners. 14: 14–18. June 1985.
- "Prayer Embraces the World". Maryknoll: 17–21. April 1985.
- "Bearing the Fruit of the Spirit: The Gift's of God's Love". Sojourners. 14: 26–30. July 1985.
- "Living in Joyful Ecstasy: A Celebration of Our Life in Christ". Sojourners. 14: 27–31. August–September 1985.
- "Prayer and Resistance: A Spirituality of Peacemaking". Harvard Divinity Bulletin. 16: 5–7, 10. October–November 1985.
- "Moving from Solitude to Community". Christianity Today (Spring): 81. 1995.

== Forewords, introductions and afterwords ==
- Dufresne, Edward R (1975). Partnership: Marriage and the Committed Life. New York: Paulist Press. ISBN 978-0-8091-1866-3. OCLC 1340563.
- Finley, James (1978). Merton's Palace of Nowhere: A Search for God Through Awareness of the True Self. Notre Dame, Indiana: Ave Maria Press. ISBN 978-0-87793-158-4. OCLC 4270582.
- Palmer, Parker (1979). In the belly of a paradox: a celebration of contradictions in the thought of Thomas Merton. Wallingford, Pa.: Pendle Hill. OCLC 4916532.
- Palmer, Parker J. (1980). The promise of paradox: a celebration of contradictions in the Christian life. Notre Dame, Ind.: Ave Maria Press. pp. 125. ISBN 978-0-87793-209-3. OCLC 6912176.
- Leech, Kenneth (1980). Soul friend: the practice of Christian spirituality. San Francisco: Harper & Row. ISBN 978-0-06-065225-8. OCLC 5829986.
- Vanderwall, Francis W (1980). Spiritual Direction: An Invitation to Abundant Life. New York: Paulist Press. ISBN 978-0-8091-2399-5. OCLC 8126098.
- Matthew the Poor (1984). The communion of love. Crestwood, N.Y.: St. Vladimir's Seminary Press. pp. 234. ISBN 978-0-88141-036-5. OCLC 10798945.
- Romero, Óscar A.; Brockman, James R. (1985). The Church is all of you. London: Fount Paperbacks. OCLC 12946628.
- Vanier, Jean (1985). Man and Woman He Made Them. Mahwah, NJ: Paulist Press. ISBN 978-0-317-28902-2. OCLC 13025956.
- Looy, H van der (1987). Rule for a new brother. Springfield, Ill.: Templegate Publishers. OCLC 20784342.
- Lucey, Rose Marciano (1987). Roots and Wings: Dreamers and Doers of the Christian Family Movement. San Jose, Calif.: Resource Publication, Inc. ISBN 978-0-89390-113-4. OCLC 15730906.
- Turner, Gordon Bruce (1987). Outside Looking In. Toronto: The United Church Publishing House. ISBN 978-0-919000-37-7. OCLC 718038315.
- Francis de Sales; Jane de Chantal (1988). Letters of spiritual direction. Translated by Péronne Marie Thibert. New York: Paulist Press. p. 296. ISBN 978-0-8091-0408-6. OCLC 17650584.
- Romero, Óscar A.; Brockman, James R. (1988). The violence of love: the pastoral wisdom of Archbishop Oscar Romero. San Francisco: Harper & Row. OCLC 17441916.
- Grout, Phil (1989). Seeds of hope: a faith journey. Elgin, Ill.: Brethren Press. ISBN 978-0-87178-779-8. OCLC 22549536.
- Wojcicki, Ed (1991). A crisis of hope in the modern world. Thomas More Press. ISBN 978-0-88347-253-8. OCLC 24700369.
- Livingston, Patricia H. (1992). Lessons of the heart: celebrating the rhythms of life. Notre Dame, Ind.: Ava Maria Press. ISBN 978-0-87793-486-8. OCLC 27035756.
- Miller, Keith (1992). The taste of new wine. Orleans, Mass.: Paraclete Press. OCLC 28113151.
- Okhuijsen, Gijs; Opzeeland, Cees van (1992). In heaven there are no thunderstorms: celebrating the liturgy with developmentally disabled people. Collegeville, Minn.: Liturgical Press. ISBN 978-0-8146-1999-5. OCLC 24953297.
- Imbach, Jeffrey D. (1992). The revovery of love: Christian mysticism and the additive society. New York: Crossroad. OCLC 804932583.
- Arnold, J. Heinrich (1994). Discipleship: living for Christ in the daily grind. Farmington, PA: Plough Pub. House. p. 282. ISBN 978-0-87486-066-5. OCLC 711797886.
- L'Arche Daybreak community (1995). Living the Beatitudes: daily reflections for Lent. Cincinnati, OH: St. Anthony Messenger Press. p. 103. OCLC 32219687.
- Gaddy, C. Welton (1995). A love affair with God: finding freedom & intimacy in prayer. Nashville, Tenn.: Broadman & Holman Publishers. ISBN 978-0-8054-6146-6. OCLC 30076314.
- Thompson, Marjorie J. (1995). Soul feast: an invitation to the Christian spiritual life. Louisville, KY: Westminster John Knox Press. ISBN 978-0-664-25548-0. OCLC 31934282.
- Buser, Christella (1996). Flowers from the ark: true stories from the homes of l'Arche. New York: Paulist Press. ISBN 978-0-8091-3639-1. OCLC 33440840.
- Jonas, Robert A. (1996). Rebecca: a father's journey from grief to gratitude. New York: Crossroad Pub. pp. 150. ISBN 978-0-8245-1552-2. OCLC 33948374.
- Delaney, John J.; Brother Lawrence (1997). The practice of the presence of God. New York: Image Books/Doubleday. OCLC 50767601.
- Eddy, Robert Merrill; Eddy, Kathy Wonson (1997). Writing with light: meditations for caregivers in word and image. Cleveland, Ohio: United Church Press. OCLC 36103672.
- Guardini, Romano (1997). Preparing yourself for Mass. Manchester, N.H.: Sophia Institute Press. OCLC 36133254.
- Gutiérrez, Gustavo (2003). We drink from our own wells: the spiritual journey of a people. Maryknoll, N.Y.: Orbis Books. OCLC 53483687.
- De Waal, Esther (2011). A retreat with Thomas Merton. Norwich: Canterbury Press. OCLC 706789402.

== Readers and compilations ==
- Garvey, John, ed. (1988). Circles of love. London: Darton, Longman and Todd. ISBN 978-0-232-51737-8. OCLC 17676710.
- Olfson, Lewy (ed.). The primacy of the heart: cuttings from a journal. Madison, Wi.: St. Benedict Center. p. 47. OCLC 18341567.
- Durback, Robert, ed. (1989). Seeds of hope: a Henri Nouwen reader. Toronto: Bantam Books. pp. 213. ISBN 978-0-553-05332-6. OCLC 18462950.
- Neilsen, Mark (ed.). The Lord is near: advent meditations from the works of Henri J.M. Nouwen. St. Louis, Mo.: Creative Communications for the Parish. p. 31. OCLC 52305721.
- Nouwen, Henri (1996). Ministry and spirituality: Creative Ministry, The Wounded Healer, Reaching Out. New York: Continuum. ISBN 978-0-8264-0910-2. OCLC 460063449.
- Adams, James E., ed. (1997). In joyful hope: meditations for Advent. St. Louis, Mo.: Creative Communications for the Parish. p. 30. OCLC 40450769.
- Nouwen, Henri (1997). Spiritual Journals: The Genesee Diary, Gracias!, the Road to Daybreak. New York: Continuum. ISBN 978-0-8264-1010-8. OCLC 851118116.
- Adams, James E., ed. (1998). Be with me, Lord: prayers and reflections for the Advent season. St. Louis, Mo: Creative Communications for the Parish. p. 31. OCLC 40450707.
- Jonas, Robert A., ed. (1998). Henri Nouwen: writings. Maryknoll, N.Y.: Orbis Books. pp. 121. ISBN 978-1-57075-197-4. OCLC 39658880.
- Dear, John, ed. (1998). The road to peace: writings on peace and justice. Maryknoll, NY: Orbis Books. ISBN 978-1-57075-180-6. OCLC 247074247.
- Jonas, Robert A., ed. (1999). Beauty of the beloved: a Henri J.M. Nouwen anthology. London: Darton, Longman & Todd. OCLC 44484274.
- Greer, Wendy Wilson, ed. (1999). The only necessary thing: living a prayerful life. New York: Crossroad Pub. Co. pp. 224. ISBN 978-0-8245-2493-7. OCLC 42022401.
- O'Laughlin, Michael, ed. (2001). Jesus: a gospel. Maryknoll, N.Y: Orbis Books. pp. 150. ISBN 978-1-57075-384-8. OCLC 248433921.
- Jones, Timothy, ed. (2001). Turn my mourning into dancing: moving through hard times with hope. Nashville, Tenn.: W Pub. Group. p. 111. ISBN 978-0-8499-4509-0. OCLC 47746315.
- Durback, Robert, ed. (2002). Henri Nouwen: in my own words. London: Darton, Longman and Todd. p. 140. ISBN 978-0-232-52463-5. OCLC 49395080.
- Laird, Rebecca; Christensen, Michael J., eds. (2003). The heart of Henri Nouwen: his words of blessing. New York: Crossroad Pub. p. 207. ISBN 978-0-8245-1985-8. OCLC 51861789.
- Neilsen, Mark, ed. (2003). Renewed for life: daily Lenten meditations from the works of Henri J.M. Nouwen. Fenton, Mo.: Creative Communications. p. 31. OCLC 298930313.
- Durback, Robert, ed. (2003). A retreat with Henri Nouwen: reclaiming our humanity. London: Darton Longman & Todd. pp. 84. ISBN 978-0-232-52529-8. OCLC 59286491.
- Ford, Michael, ed. (2004). Eternal Seasons: A Liturgical Journey with Henri J.M. Nouwen. Notre Dame, Ind.: Sorin Books. ISBN 978-1-893732-77-3. OCLC 53131852.
- Ford, Michael, ed. (2005). The dance of life: spiritual direction with Henri Nouwen. London: Darton, Longman & Todd. p. 130. ISBN 978-0-232-52605-9. OCLC 58555552.
- Ford, Michael, ed. (2005). The Dance of Life: Weaving Sorrows and Blessings into One Joyful Step. Ave Maria Press. ISBN 978-1-59471-087-2. OCLC 66266716.
- Bauer, Judith A., ed. (2005). An hour with Henri J.M. Nouwen. Liguori, MO: Liguori. p. 31. ISBN 978-0-7648-1305-4. OCLC 298930353.
- Sroka, Len, ed. (2005). Henri Nouwen illuminated. Skokie: ACTA Publications. ISBN 978-0-87946-288-8. OCLC 70869802.
- Nouwen, Henri J.M. (2005). Show me the way: readings for each day of Lent (New ed.). London: Darton Longman & Todd. p. 144. ISBN 978-0-232-52648-6. OCLC 62226427.
- Imbach, Jeff, ed. (2005). Words of hope and healing: 99 sayings. Hyde Park, NY: New City Press. p. 99. ISBN 978-1-56548-227-2. OCLC 57722628.
- Ford, Michael, ed. (2007). Arrivals and departures: the restless world of Henri J. M. Nouwen. London: Darton Longman & Todd. p. 102. ISBN 978-0-232-52710-0. OCLC 166374027.
- Ford, Michael, ed. (2007). Eternal seasons: a spiritual journey through the church's year. Notre Dame, Ind.: Ave Maria Press. p. 251. ISBN 978-1-59471-147-3. OCLC 173516430.
- Ford, Michael, ed. (2008). A Restless Soul: Meditations from the Road. Notre Dame, Ind.: Ave Maria Press. ISBN 978-1-59471-163-3. OCLC 176877040.
- Jonas, Robert A., ed. (2009). The essential Henri Nouwen (1st ed.). Boston: Shambhala. p. 191. ISBN 978-1-59030-664-2. OCLC 316233304.
- Waldron, Robert, ed. (2009). Henri Nouwen: a book of hours. New York: Seabury Books. p. 160. ISBN 978-1-59627-112-8. OCLC 369137270.
- Christensen, Michael; Laird, Rebecca (2010). Spiritual Formation: Following the movements of the Spirit. New York: HarperOne. ISBN 978-0-06-168612-2. OCLC 456180150.
- Christensen, Michael J.; Laird, Rebecca J., eds. (2011). Spiritual direction: wisdom for the long walk of faith. London: Society for Promoting Christian Knowledge. p. 172. ISBN 978-0-281-06422-9. OCLC 692277496.
