= Albert of Vercelli =

Italian Catholic prelate (1149–1214)

Saint Albert of Jerusalem OSC
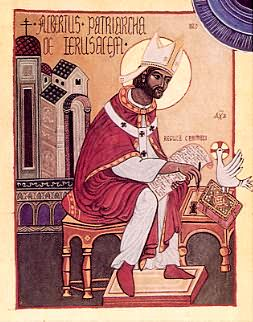

Patriarch of Jerusalem
- Born: 1149; Gualtieri, Italy
- Died: 14 September 1214 (aged 64–65); Acre, Kingdom of Jerusalem
- Venerated in: Catholic Church
- Feast: 14 September, 17 September (Order of the Brothers of the Blessed Virgin Mary of Mount Carmel), 17 September (on some calendars), 25 September (on some calendars), 8 April (on some calendars)

Albert of Jerusalem, OSC (1149 – 14 September 1214), also Albertus Hierosolymitanus, Albertus Vercelensis, Saint Albert, Albert of Vercelli or Alberto Avogadro, was a canon lawyer and saint. He was Bishop of Bobbio and Bishop of Vercelli, and served as mediator and diplomat under Pope Clement III. Innocent III appointed him Patriarch of Jerusalem in 1204 or 1205. In Jerusalem, he contributed the Carmelite Rule of St. Albert to the newly-founded Order of the Brothers of the Blessed Virgin Mary of Mount Carmel. Albert is honoured as a saint in the Roman Catholic Church and commemorated in the liturgical calendar of the Carmelites on 17 September.

== Life ==
Born at Castel Gualtieri, Italy, he was educated in theology and law. He entered the Canons Regular of the Holy Cross at Mortara and was elected prior in 1180. He became Bishop of Bobbio in 1184, and a year later was appointed Bishop of Vercelli. He served the papacy as a mediator and diplomat between Pope Clement III and Holy Roman Emperor Frederick Barbarossa. Albert served as papal legate in 1199 and helped end the war between Parma and Piacenza.

In 1205, he was made Patriarch of Jerusalem by Pope Innocent III, whom he also served as papal legate in the Holy Land. As patriarch, Albert helped found the Carmelites around 1209, in particular by his composition of what came to be called the Carmelite Rule of St. Albert. This order was based on Mount Carmel, across the Bay of Haifa from Acre, where he resided as patriarch.

Additionally, he mediated disputes between the Kingdom of Jerusalem and the Kingdom of Cyprus and between the Knights Templar and the Armenian Kingdom of Cilicia. In 1214, he had been invited to the Fourth Lateran Council, but the Master of the Hospital of the Holy Spirit, whom he had rebuked and deposed for immorality, stabbed him to death on 14 September, while taking part in a procession on the Feast of the Exaltation of the Holy Cross. He was succeeded by Raoul of Merencourt.

== See also ==
- Book of the First Monks
- Constitutions of the Carmelite Order

Catholic Church titles
Preceded by Soffred	Latin Patriarch of Jerusalem; 1204–1214	Succeeded by Ralph of Mérencourt
