= Brother Lawrence =

French Christian monk

Brother Lawrence of the Resurrection O.C.D.
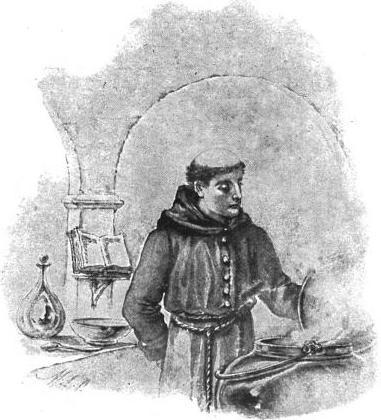
- Born: Nicolas Herman; 1614; Hériménil, Kingdom of France
- Died: February 12, 1691; Paris, Kingdom of France
- Occupations: Lay brother, Discalced Carmelite monastery

Brother Lawrence of the Resurrection, OCD (born Nicolas Herman; c. 1614 – 12 February 1691) was a French Catholic religious brother who served at a Discalced Carmelite monastery, what is now Saint-Joseph-des-Carmes in Paris. He is best remembered for a posthumous book of his writing, the classic Christian text The Practice of the Presence of God.

== Biography ==
Brother Lawrence was born Nicolas Herman in Hériménil, near Lunéville in the region of Lorraine, located in modern-day eastern France. His parents were peasants, so his schooling was limited at best. Young Nicholas Herman grew up during the Thirty Years' War, which devastated central Europe between 1618 and 1648. As a young man, Herman's poverty forced him into joining the army, which guaranteed him meals and a small stipend. During this period, Herman claimed an experience which set him on a unique spiritual journey. At the age of 16, he saw a leafless tree in the middle of a battlefield. Realizing that the tree would be in full leaf and flower in a few months, he saw the tree as a symbol of God's ability to transform the human heart.

He fought in the Thirty Years' War and, following an injury, left the army and served as a valet. In 1635, he fought against Swedish infantry and French cavalry at Rambervillers, not far from his home village. He was taken prisoner by German troops on the march and was threatened with hanging under suspicion of being a spy. He fearlessly answered that he was not what they suspected. When the soldiers saw his courage they released him. The Swedes entered Lorraine, and while passing through the area attacked the little town of Rambervillers where he became wounded, leaving him permanently lame. Rambervillers had 2660 inhabitants at the time; eight years later there were only 400 survivors. He never spoke of the horrors he had experienced, but the effects remained with him for the rest of his life. After a period of convalescence in his parents' home, he entered the employment of William de Fuibert, treasurer to the king of France. Serving as a footman, Lawrence describes himself as "a great awkward fellow who broke everything".

Thus when his service as a footman ended, Nicholas sought spiritual fulfillment in the solitude of a hermit's life. He firmly resolved to follow in the footsteps of his uncle, a holy Discalced Carmelite. In mid-June, at the age of twenty-six, he entered the Discalced Carmelites at what is now Saint-Joseph-des-Carmes on the Rue de Vaugirard in Paris, as a lay brother. In June 1640, Nicolas joined the Discalced Carmelite Priory in Paris. He entered the priory as a lay brother and took the religious name "Lawrence of the Resurrection". He made his solemn profession of vows on August 14, 1642. He spent the rest of his life with the Parisian community, where his primary assignments were working in the kitchen and, in his later years, repairing sandals. He entered fearing 'they would skin him alive' for his awkwardness and faults—as he said in his own unpolished language, often seasoned with humor—but fortunately for himself and his brothers 'he experienced only satisfaction'. He carried out this office of cook until his leg became ulcerated, at which point his superiors assigned him an easier task, as a sandal maker. Lawrence suffered from 'a kind of sciatic gout that made him limp' and worsened as the years went by. Gradually, the influence of the humble sandal-maker grew, not only among the poor. Many learned people, religious and ecclesiastics had esteem for him as well.

Despite his lowly position in life and the priory, his character attracted many to him. He had a reputation for experiencing profound peace and visitors came to seek spiritual guidance from him. The wisdom he passed on to them, in conversations and in letters, would later become the basis for the book The Practice of the Presence of God. The conversations had been conducted and recorded by a notable cleric, the Abbé Joseph de Beaufort, who compiled this work after Brother Lawrence died. This little book was approved by Archbishop of Paris, Louis Antoine de Noailles. When the Archbishop of Paris approved the life of Brother Lawrence made by his Grand Vicar and in his own organisation, he approved that it is said that this brother "forgot himself and was willing to lose himself for God, That he no longer thought of virtue or his salvation ... that he had always governed himself by love without interest. The book consists of sixteen short Letters by himself, a short collection of Spiritual Maxims embodying his views, four Conversations, probably written down by M. Beaufort and a brief Life, apparently from the same hand. It became popular among Catholics and Protestants alike, with John Wesley, Willard L Sperry, A. W. Tozer and Hannah Whitall Smith recommending it to others. Hannah Whitall Smith writes: "This little book seems to me one of the most helpful I know."

Father de Beaufort recalls that "Lawrence was open, eliciting confidence, letting you feel you could tell him anything ... Once you got past the rough exterior you discovered unusual wisdom, a freedom beyond the reach of the ordinary lay brother".

He was ill three times during the last years of his life. When he recovered the first time he said to his physician, "Doctor, your remedies have worked too well for me. You have only delayed my happiness." He ended his last letter on February 6 with, "I hope for the merciful grace of seeing him in a few days." Lucid up to the last moments, Brother Lawrence died at the age of seventy-seven. His death on February 12, 1691 occurred in relative obscurity, but his teachings lived on in the compilation of his words. François Fénelon, his compatriot and cousin of Madame Guyon, quoted and discussed his views in the books he wrote and also compared him to Jean-Joseph Surin His words from first letter to give the all for the all are a well-known phrase in the writings both of Madame Guyon and of Fenelon.

François Fénelon in Œuvres de Fénelon (p. 430) in a letter to a lady dated Thursday, August 5 (1700), says that he met Brother Lawrence and describes him as follows:

The sayings of the saints are well outside the rhetoric of traditions they are painting. Saint Catherine of Genoa is a genius of love. Brother Lawrence (Laurent) looks rough in appearance, and gentle by manners. This blend demonstrates God in him. I met him and there's a place in the book where the author, without naming me by name, told in a nutshell a very good talk I had with him about death when he was very ill and very cheerful.

== See also ==
- Carmelite Rule of St. Albert
- Book of the First Monks
- Constitutions of the Carmelite Order
- Hermit

== Bibliography ==
- S.P. Michel, Laurent de la Résurrection, in Dictionnaire de spiritualité, Beauchesne, Paris 1976, 415-147.
- C. De Meester, Frère Laurent en quête de la sainteté, «Carmel» 65 (1992), 45-49.
- C. De Meester, Lorenzo della Risurrezione, in Nuovo dizionario di mistica, LEV, Città del Vaticano 2016, 1241-1242.
- C. Stercal, La pratica della presenza. Una lezione dal XVII secolo, «Il Regno - Attualità» 10 (2026), 297-298.
