= Religious institute =

Catholic community of vowed members

In the Catholic Church, a religious institute is "a society in which members, according to proper law, pronounce public vows, either perpetual or temporary which are to be renewed, however, when the period of time has elapsed, and lead a life of brothers or sisters in common."

A religious institute is one of the two types of institutes of consecrated life; the other is the secular institute, where its members are "living in the world". Religious institutes come under the jurisdiction of the Dicastery for Institutes of Consecrated Life and Societies of Apostolic Life.

== Description ==
A member of a religious institute lives in community with other members of the institute and observes the three evangelical counsels of chastity, poverty, and obedience, which they bind themselves to observe by public vows.

== Classification ==
Since every religious institute has its own unique charism, it adheres to a particular way of religious living whether contemplative or apostolic. Thus, the nuns of some contemplative orders are subject to papal enclosure.

Other religious institutes have apostolates that wherein their members interact with the secular world, such as in teaching, healthcare, social work, while maintaining their distinctiveness in communal living. Several founders required members of their institute not only to profess the three evangelical counsels of chastity, poverty, and obedience, but also to vow or promise enclosure or loyalty.

Religious orders are discerned as:

- monastic made up of monks, some of whom may be clerics, or nuns who are bound to live and work at their monastery and celebrate the Liturgy of the Hours in common
- mendicant made up of friars, some of whom may be clerics, who, while living and praying in common, may have a more active apostolate, and depend on alms for their support
- canons regular made up of canons (clerics) and canonesses regular, who sing the liturgy in choir and may run parish-like apostolates
- clerics regular made up of priests who are also vowed religious and who usually have a more active apostolate

In each instance, the term "regular" means those following a rule; either a pre-existing one such as the Rule of Saint Augustine or the Rule of St Basil, etc. or one composed by the founder, which generally incorporates aspects of earlier, traditional rules such as those mentioned or the Rule of Saint Benedict.

== Terminology ==
- Traditionally, institutes for men are referred to as the "first orders".
- Those of women as the second orders.
- Some religious orders, for example the Franciscans or the Dominicans, have third orders.
  - Associated members who live in community and follow a rule are called third order religious. Various religious congregations are tertiaries.
  - Members who, without living in formal community, have made a private vow or promise, such as of perseverance in pious life. They are often called third order secular.

In common parlance, all members of male religious institutes are often termed monks and those of female religious institutes nuns, although in an accurate sense, a monk is one who lives in a monastery under a monastic rule such as that of Saint Benedict. The term friar properly refers to a male member of a mendicant order.

The term nun was in the 1917 Code of Canon Law reserved for members of a women's religious institute of solemn vows, and is sometimes applied only to those who devote themselves wholly to the contemplative life and belong to one of the enclosed religious orders living and working within the and reciting the Liturgy of the Hours in community.

Historically, what are now called religious institutes were distinguished as either religious orders, whose members make solemn vows, or religious congregations, whose members make simple vows. Since the 1983 Code of Canon Law, only the term religious institute is used, while the distinction between solemn and simple vows is still maintained.

== Admission and religious vows ==
Admittance to a religious institute is regulated by the requirements canon law states. Religious profession can be temporary or perpetual: "Temporary profession is to be made for the period defined by the institute's own law. This period may not be less than three years nor longer than six years."

Broadly speaking, after a period spanning postulancy, and novitiate and while in temporary vows to test their vocation with a particular institute, members wishing to be admitted permanently are required to make public and perpetual vows.

A vow is classified as public if a legitimate superior accepts it in the name of the church, as happens when one joins a religious institute. In making their religious profession, the members are "incorporated into the institute, with the rights and duties defined by law", and "through the ministry of the Church they are consecrated to God."

Typically, members of religious institutes either take vows of evangelical chastity, poverty, and obedience (the "Evangelical Counsels") to lead a life in imitation of Christ Jesus, or, those following the Rule of Saint Benedict, the vows of obedience, stability (that is, to remain with this particular community until death and not seek to move to another), and "conversion of life" which implicitly includes the counsels of chastity and evangelical poverty. Some institutes take additional vows (a "fourth vow" is typical), specifying some particular work or defining condition of their way of life. E.g., the Jesuit vow to undertake any mission upon which they are sent by the pope; the Missionaries of Charity vow to serve always the poorest of the poor.

The traditional distinction between simple and solemn vows no longer has any juridical effect. Solemn vows once meant those taken in what was called a religious order. "Today, in order to know when a vow is solemn it will be necessary to refer to the proper law of the institutes of consecrated life."

Should the members want to leave the institute after perpetual vows, they would have to seek a papal indult of dispensation. The benefits of the profession are of a spiritual nature.

Daily living in religious institutes is regulated by canon law as well as the particular rule they have adopted and their own constitutions and customs. Their respective timetables ("horarium") allocate due time to communal prayer, private prayer, spiritual reading, work, meals, communal recreation, sleep, and fixes any hours during which stricter silence is to be observed, in accordance with their own institute's charism.

== Religious rules, constitutions and statutes ==
Religious institutes generally follow one of the four great religious rules: Rule of St Basil, Rule of Saint Benedict, Rule of Saint Augustine, and the Rule of Saint Francis. The Rule of St Basil, one of the earliest rules for Christian religious life, is followed primarily by monastic communities of Byzantine tradition. Western monastics (Benedictines, Trappists, Cistercians, etc.) observe the Rule of Saint Benedict, a collection of precepts for what is called contemplative religious life. The Rule of Saint Augustine stresses self-denial, moderation, and care for those in need. Many canons regular follow the Rule of Saint Augustine.

Carmelites follow the Rule of Saint Albert, which was written specifically for them in the early 1200s by Albert of Vercelli and approved in slightly revised form by Pope Innocent IV. Jesuits follow what is called not a rule, but the constitutions composed by Saint Ignatius of Loyola, which laid aside traditional practices such as chanting the liturgy in favour of greater adaptability and mobility.

Some institutes combine a rule with constitutions that give more precise indications for the life of the members. Thus the Capuchin Constitutions of 1536 are added to the Rule of Saint Francis. In addition to the more fundamental provisions of the rule or constitutions, religious institutes have statutes that are more easily subject to change.

== Foundation and approval ==
Religious institutes normally begin as an association formed, with the consent of the diocesan bishop, for the purpose of becoming a religious institute. After time has provided proof of the rectitude, seriousness and durability of the new association, the bishop, having obtained permission of the Holy See, may formally set it up as a religious institute under his own jurisdiction. Later, when it has grown in numbers, perhaps extending also into other dioceses, and further proved its worth, the Holy See may grant it formal approval, bringing it under the Holy See's responsibility, rather than that of the bishops of the dioceses where it is present.

For the good of such institutes and to provide for the needs of their apostolate, the Holy See may exempt them from the governance of the local bishops, bringing them entirely under the authority of the Holy See itself or of someone else. In some respects, for example public liturgical practice, they always remain under the local bishop's supervision.

== History ==
=== First millennium ===
==== Roots in Egypt and Syriac- and Greek-speaking East ====
From the earliest times there were probably individual hermits who lived a life in isolation in imitation of Jesus' 40 days in the desert. They have left no confirmed archaeological traces and only hints in the written record. Communities of virgins who had consecrated themselves to Christ are found at least as far back as the 2nd century. There were also individual ascetics, known as the "devout", who usually lived not in the deserts but on the edge of inhabited places, still remaining in the world but practicing asceticism and striving for union with God, although extreme ascetism such as encratism was regarded as suspect by the Church.

Paul of Thebes (fl. 3rd century), commemorated in the writings of St Jerome, is regarded as the first Christian hermit in Egypt, his withdrawal into the desert apparently having been prompted by the persecution of the Christians at the time. Saint Anthony was the first to leave the world to live in the desert for specifically spiritual reasons; St Athanasius speaks of him as an anchorite. In upper Egypt, sometime around 323, Saint Pachomius the Great decided to organize his disciples into a form of community in which they lived in individual huts or rooms (cellula in Latin), but worked, ate, and worshipped in shared space.

Guidelines for daily life were drawn up (a monastic 'rule'), and several monasteries were founded, nine for men and two for women. This method of monastic organization is called cenobitic or "community-based". Toward the end of his life Saint Pachomius was therefore not only the abbot of a monastery but also the head of a whole group of monasteries.

The Greeks (e.g. St Basil the Great of Cappadocian Caesarea) and the Syriac-speaking east had their own monastic traditions (e.g. St Ephrem of Nisibis and Edessa).

==== Gaul ====
The earliest forms of monasticism in Western Europe involved figures such as Martin of Tours, who established a hermitage near Milan. He then moved on to Poitiers, where a community gathered around his hermitage. In 372 he was called to become Bishop of Tours, and established a monastery at Marmoutiers on the opposite bank of the Loire River. His monastery was laid out as a colony of hermits rather than as a single integrated community.

John Cassian began his monastic career at a monastery in Palestine around 385 to study monastic practice there. In Egypt he had been attracted to the isolated life of hermits, which he considered the highest form of monasticism, yet the monasteries he founded were all organized monastic communities. About 410 he established two monasteries near Marseille, one for men, one for women. In time these attracted a total of 5,000 monks and nuns. Most significant for the future development of monasticism were Cassian's Institutes, which provided a guide for monastic life and his Conferences, a collection of spiritual reflections.

Honoratus was a wealthy Gallo-Roman aristocrat, who after a pilgrimage to Egypt, founded the Monastery of Lérins, on an island lying off the modern city of Cannes. Lérins became, in time, a center of monastic culture and learning, and many later monks and bishops would pass through Lérins in the early stages of their career.

==== Italy ====
The anonymous Rule of the Master (Regula magistri), was written somewhere south of Rome around 500. The rule adds administrative elements not found in earlier rules, defining the activities of the monastery, its officers, and their responsibilities in great detail. One of the writings that influenced the Master was Saint Augustine's Letter 211, which was sent to a community of women in the city of Hippo governed by his sister. Augustine's writings were well known in the West in the sixth century (though unknown in the East until several centuries later) and his texts on religious or monastic life were considered standard.

Benedict of Nursia was educated in Rome but soon sought the life of a hermit in a cave at Subiaco, outside the city. He then attracted followers with whom he founded the monastery of Monte Cassino around 520, between Rome and Naples. His Rule is shorter than the Master's. It became by the 9th century the standard monastic rule in Western Europe.

==== Ireland ====
The earliest Monastic settlements in Ireland emerged at the end of the 5th century. The first identifiable founder of a monastery was Saint Brigid of Kildare, who ranked with Saint Patrick as a major figure of the Irish church. The monastery at Kildare was a double monastery, with both men and women ruled by the Abbess, a pattern found in many other monastic foundations.

Commonly, Irish monasteries were established by grants of land to an abbot or abbess, who came from a local noble family. The monastery became the spiritual focus of the tribe or kin group. Irish monastic rules specify a stern life of prayer and discipline in which prayer, poverty, and obedience are the central themes. However Irish monks read even secular Latin texts with an enthusiasm that their contemporaries on the continent lacked. By the end of the 7th century, Irish monastic schools were attracting students from England and from Europe.

Irish monasticism spread widely, first to Scotland and Northern England, and then to Gaul and Italy. Saint Columba and his followers established monasteries at Bangor, on the northeastern coast of Ireland, at Iona in Scotland, and at Lindisfarne, in Northumbria. Saint Columbanus, an abbot from a Leinster noble family, travelled to Gaul in the late 6th century with twelve companions. He and his followers spread the Irish model of monastic institutions established by noble families to the continent.

A whole series of new rural monastic foundations on great rural estates under Irish influence sprang up, starting with St. Columbanus's foundations of Fontaines and Luxeuil, sponsored by the Frankish King Childebert II. After Childebert's death St. Columbanus travelled east to Metz, where Theudebert II allowed him to establish a new monastery among the semi-pagan Alemanni in what is now Switzerland. One of St. Columbanus's followers founded the monastery of St. Gall on the shores of Lake Constance, while St. Columbanus continued onward across the Alps to the kingdom of the Lombards in Italy. There King Agilulf and his wife Theodolinda granted St. Columbanus land in the mountains between Genoa and Milan, where he established the monastery of Bobbio.

=== Developments around 1100 ===
A monastic revival already begun in the 10th century with the Cluniac reform, which organized into an order with common governance the monasteries following the Benedictine Rule that chose to join it or were founded by it. 1084 saw the foundation of the Carthusian monasteries, which combined the hermit life with that of the cloister, each monk having his own hermitage, coming together only for the liturgy and an occasional meal, and having no contact with the outside world.

Later came the Cistercians, a foundation that seemed destined to fail. In 1113, a band of 30 young men of the noblest families of Burgundy arrived, led by Bernard of Clairvaux, then 23 years old, who was a dominating figure in Western Europe for forty years. This was followed by the foundation in 1120 of the Canons Regular of Prémontré, not monks but clergy devoted to ascetism, study and pastoral care. These aggregations of monasteries marked a departure from the previously existing arrangement whereby each monastery was totally independent and could decide what rule to follow. It also prepared the way for the quite different religious orders of the 13th century.

=== 13th century ===
The 13th century saw the founding and rapid spread of the Dominicans in 1216 and the Franciscans in 1210, two of the principal mendicant orders, who supported themselves not, as the monasteries did, by rent on landed property, but by work and the charitable aid of others. Both these institutes had vows of poverty but, while for the Franciscans poverty was an aim in itself, the Dominicans, treating poverty as a means or instrument, were allowed to own their churches and convents. Similar institutes that appeared at about the same time were the Augustinians, Carmelites, and Servites. While the monasteries had chosen situations in the remote countryside, these new institutes, which aimed at least as much at evangelizing others as at sanctifying their own members, had their houses in the cities and towns.

=== 16th century and later ===
By the constitution Inter cetera of 20 January 1521, Pope Leo X appointed a rule for tertiaries with simple vows. Under this rule, enclosure was optional, enabling non-enclosed followers of the rule to engage in various works of charity not allowed to enclosed religious. In 1566 and 1568, Pope Pius V rejected this class of institute, but they continued to exist and even increased in number. After at first being merely tolerated, they afterward obtained approval, gaining in December 1900 recognition as religious by Pope Leo XIII.

Their lives were oriented not to the ancient monastic way of life, but more to social service and to evangelization, both in Europe and in mission areas. The number of these "congregations", not "orders", increased further in the upheavals brought by the French Revolution and subsequent Napoleonic invasions of other Catholic countries, depriving thousands of monks and nuns of the income that their communities held because of inheritances and forcing them to find a new way of living their religious life. Examples of such institutes are the Claretians, La Salle Brothers, Passionists, Redemptorists, and Vincentians.

A special case happened in 1540. Ignatius of Loyola obtained authorization for the members of the Society of Jesus to be divided into professed with solemn vows and coadjutors with dispensable simple vows. The novelty was found in the nature of these simple vows, since they constituted the Jesuit coadjutors as religious in the true and proper sense of the word, with the consequent privileges and exemption of regulars, including them being a diriment impediment to matrimony, etc. In theory, the recognition as religious for simple vows had universal validity, but in practice, the Roman Curia considered it an exclusive privilege to the Society of Jesus.

=== 20th century ===
The 1917 Code of Canon Law reserved the name "religious order" for institutes in which the vows were solemn, and used the term "religious congregation" or simply "congregation" for those with simple vows. The members of a religious order for men were called "regulars", those belonging to a religious congregation were simply "religious", a term that applied also to regulars. For women, those with simple vows were simply "sisters", with the term "nun" reserved in canon law for those who belonged to an institute of solemn vows, even if in some localities they were allowed to take simple vows instead.

The same Code also abolished the distinction according to which solemn vows, unlike simple vows, were indissoluble. It recognized no totally indispensable religious vows and thereby abrogated for the Latin Church the special consecration that distinguished "orders" (institutes with solemn vows) from "congregations" (institutes with simple vows), while keeping some juridical distinctions between the two classes. Even these remaining juridical distinctions were abolished by the 1983 Code of Canon Law, which distinguishes solemn from simple vows but does not divide religious into categories on that basis.

By then a new form of institutes of consecrated life had emerged alongside that of religious institutes: in 1947 Pope Pius XII recognized secular institutes as a form in which Christians profess the evangelical counsels of chastity, poverty, and obedience while living in the world.

== Life-span ==
In 1972, the French Jesuit Raymond Hostie published his study Vie et mort des ordres religieux (Paris. Desclée de Brouwer), an English translation of which appeared in 1983 as The Life and Death of Religious Orders (Washington: CARA). Hostie argued that the life of a religious institute passes through successive stages: 10–20 years of gestation, 20–40 years of consolidation, a century or so of expansion, another century or so of stabilization, 50–100 years of decline, followed by death, even if death is not officially declared until later.

In this view, a religious institute lasts 250–350 years before being replaced by another religious institute with a similar life-span. Hostie recognized that there are exceptions: Benedictines, Franciscans, Dominicans, Augustinians, and some others have lasted longer, either because they transformed from what they were originally or because of the prestige of their founders. In 2015, Giancarlo Rocca suggested that attention should be given not so much to the life-span of individual religious institutes, as to the duration of what Rocca called "religious institutions", corresponding to the juridical categories of monastics, canons, mendicant orders, clerks regular, priestly societies, religious congregations, and secular institutes.

The religious institutes that have disappeared since 1960 have mostly been congregations. This class of institutes with simple vows and a strong emphasis on apostolate arose shortly before the French Revolution. They modernized the Church, the State, and religious life itself. Older institutes adopted some of their features, especially in the fields of education and health care, areas, that the State has now almost entirely taken over.

This suggests that the life-span of a religious institute is largely determined by the point at which it comes into being, within the life cycle of the "religious institution" to which it belongs. "Religious institutions" themselves do not necessarily disappear altogether with time, but they lose importance, as happened to monasticism, which is no longer the force it was in the Middle Ages before the mendicant orders eclipsed it.

== See also ==
- List of Catholic religious institutes
- Religious order (Catholic)
- Society of apostolic life
- Vocational discernment in the Catholic Church
