= Hériménil =

- Commune
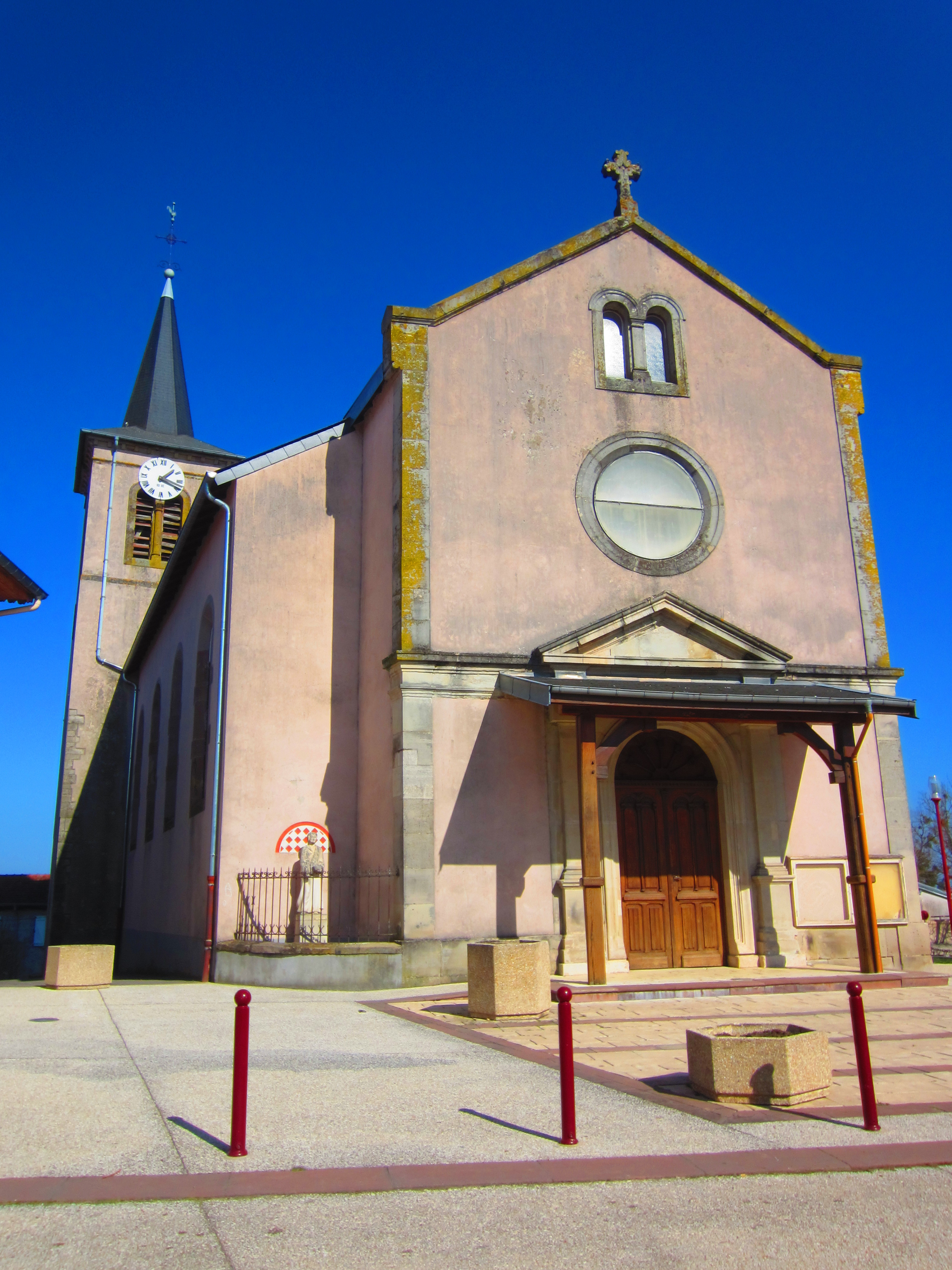
- The church in Hériménil

- Coat of arms
- Location of Hériménil
- Location within France Location within Grand Est
- Coordinates: 48°34′04″N 6°30′02″E
- Country: France
- Region: Grand Est
- Department: Meurthe-et-Moselle
- Arrondissement: Lunéville
- Canton: Lunéville-2
- Intercommunality: CC Territoire de Lunéville à Baccarat

Government
  - Mayor (2020–2026): Damien Mathivet
- Area^{1}: 12.48 km^{2} (4.82 sq mi)
- Elevation: 238 m (781 ft)
- Highest elevation: 293 m (961 ft)
- Lowest elevation: 222 m (728 ft)
- Population (2023): 894
  - Density: 71.6/km^{2} (186/sq mi)
- Time zone: UTC+01:00 (CET)
  - Summer (DST): UTC+02:00 (CEST)
- INSEE/Postal code: 54260 /54300
- ^{1} French Land Register data, which excludes lakes, ponds, glaciers > 1 km^{2} (0.386 sq mi or 247 acres) and river estuaries.

Hériménil (French pronunciation: [eʁimenil]) is a commune in the Meurthe-et-Moselle department in north-eastern France.

== Notable people ==
- Nicholas Herman, a.k.a. Brother Lawrence of the Resurrection (c. 1614 – 12 February 1691), about whose life the book The Practice of the Presence of God was written.
- René Maire (29 May 1878 – 24 November 1949), French botanist and mycologist.

== See also ==
- Communes of the Meurthe-et-Moselle department
