= Josefa Naval Girbés =

Spanish Secular Carmelite (1820–1893)

Blessed Josefa Naval Girbés OCDS
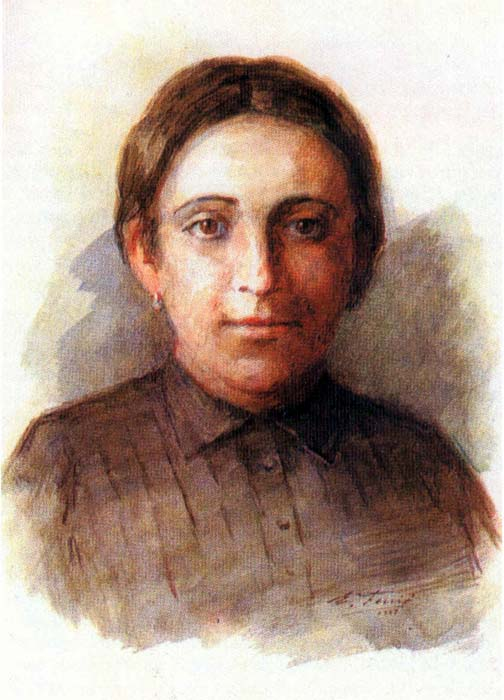

Virgin
- Born: 11 December 1820; Algemesí, Valencia, Spain
- Died: 24 February 1893 (aged 72); Algemesí, Valencia, Spain
- Resting place: Cathedral of Valencia, Spain
- Venerated in: Roman Catholic Church
- Beatified: 25 September 1988, Saint Peter's Basilica, Vatican City by Pope John Paul II
- Feast: 24 February, 6 November (Secular Order of Discalced Carmelites)

Josefa Naval Girbés, OCDS (11 December 1820 – 24 February 1893) was a Spanish Catholic member of the Secular Order of Discalced Carmelites. She worked with cholera patients towards the end of her life which, along with her heart condition, contributed to her death in 1893. She opened a home for the spiritual development of all people and worked to educate them and earned a reputation as an educator and catechist.

Pope John Paul II beatified her on 25 September 1988. She has been recognized across Spain for her commitment to Church life and in the field of education, for her personal holiness and the conduct in which she led her life.

== Life ==
Josefa Naval Girbés was born on 11 December 1820 in Algemesi, Spain as the eldest of six children of Vincenzo and Josefa Girbés. She was baptized hours after with the name of "Josefa Maria". She attended the school of a close neighbor and learned needlework in addition to the core educational framework. She received the sacrament of Confirmation and First Communion at the age of eight and nine.

Her mother died on 19 June 1833 at the age of 35, and Josefa was forced to leave school in order to look after her household and her brothers. Her father died several decades later in 1862.

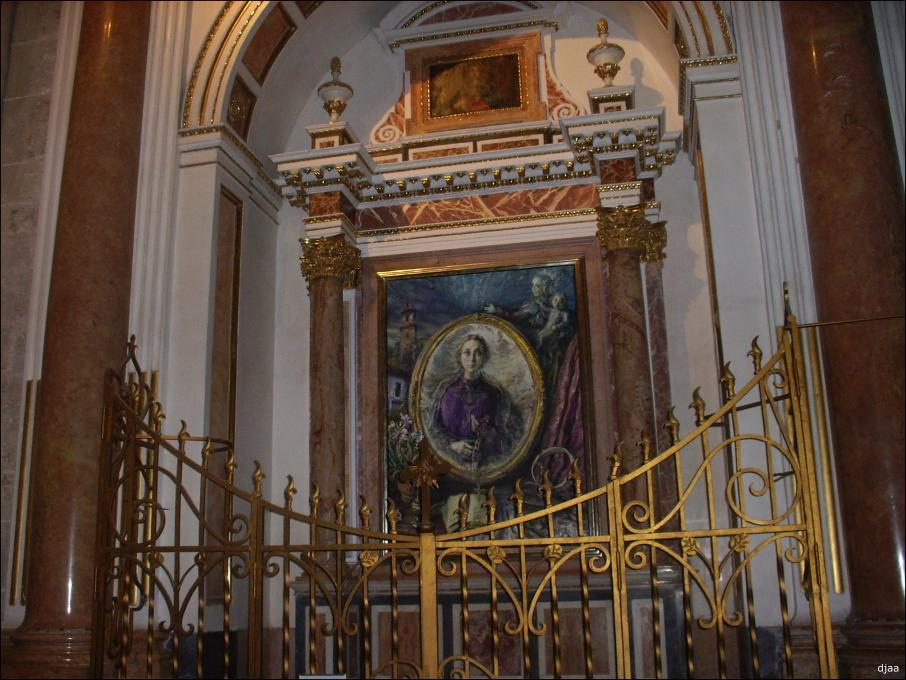
Chapel of Bl. Josefa Naval in the Cathedral of Valencia

She chose as her spiritual guide the parish priest Gaspar Silvestre. In early youth, she took a vow of virginity on 4 December 1838 in order to consecrate herself to Jesus Christ, later she became a member of the Secular_Order_of_Discalced_Carmelites. She opened a home where she taught people needlework and also focused on the moral and spiritual formation of people which included the children.

Girbés began to feel chronic pains in 1891 due to a heart condition and was in great pain as a result of it. She died in 1893 after a long illness related to that heart ailment. Her last request was granted: to be buried in the brown tunic and white mantle of the Carmelite habit. Her remains were transferred on 20 October 1946.

== Beatification ==
The process for the beatification commenced on 25 February 1982, despite the fact that there had been two causes that had opened before this: the first was held from 22 December 1950 to 30 June 1952 while the other spanned from 23 February 1956 to 28 May 1956. Both of these processes were ratified in 1982 and the introduction of the cause granted her the title of Servant of God. Pope John Paul II recognized her virtuous life and proclaimed her to be venerable on 3 January 1987.

On 25 September 1988 John Paul II approved A miracle attributed to her intercession and beatified Josefa Naval Girbés several weeks later. A second miracle attributed to her intercession and needed for her canonization was investigated and the process that ensured was ratified on 12 May 2006 with the information sent to Rome to be evaluated. The Rome-based medical board approved the miracle on 22 May 2014.
