= Donald Attwater =

British Catholic author, editor and translator (1892-1977)

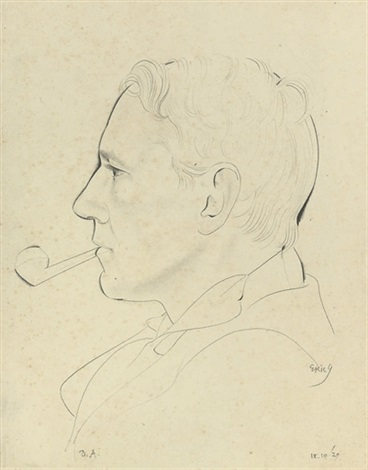
Donald Attwater by Eric Gill, 1929, private collection.

Donald Attwater (24 December 1892 – 30 January 1977) was a British Catholic author, editor and translator, and a visiting lecturer at the University of Notre Dame.

== Life ==
Attwater was born in Essex, England, on 24 December 1892. His parents were Methodists who became Anglicans while Attwater was a child. He himself became a Catholic at the age of 18. He studied Law but did not earn a degree.

He served in the Sinai and Palestine campaign during the First World War, developing an interest in Eastern Christianity while in the Middle East. After the war, he lived for a time on Caldey Island, undergoing the influence of the monks of Caldey Abbey. He also became a friend and admirer of Eric Gill. Throughout the 1930s, 40s and 50s he was a frequent contributor to the Catholic press in both Britain and America, and a prolific author of books on Christian themes.

In 1936, he was one of the founders of the Catholic peace movement Pax, which opposed the invasion of Abyssinia by Fascist Italy.

Attwater was married to Rachel Attwater of South Wales, a fellow historian and published author on Catholic saints in the Orient. He died in Storrington, Sussex, in February 1977.

== Writings ==
As author

- Father Ignatius of Llanthony: A Victorian (1931)
- The Catholic Church in Modern Wales (1935)
- The Dissident Eastern Churches (1937)
- The White Fathers in Africa (1937)
- The Golden Book of Eastern Saints (1938)
- Life of St. John Chrysostom (1939)
- Names and Name Days (1939)
- Eastern Catholic Worship (1945)
- The Christian Church of the East (1947)
- The Black Friars in Wales (1949)
- Saints Westward (1953)
- A Dictionary of Mary (1956)
- Martyrs, from St. Stephen to John Tung (1957)
- Saints of the East (1963)
- Dictionary of the Popes (1965)
- The Cell of Good Living (1969)

As translator

- Vladimir Solovyov, God, Man, and the Church
- Nikolai Berdyaev, The End of Our Time (1933)
- Nikolai Berdyaev, Christianity and Class War (1933)
- Nikolai Berdyaev, Dostoievsky: An Interpretation (1934)
- Charles de Foucauld, Memories of Charles de Foucauld: Explorer and Hermit, Seen in His Letters, edited by Georges Gorrée (1938)
- Hippolyte Delehaye, The Legends of the Saints (1962)
- Yves Congar, Lay People in the Church (1963)
- Jean Daniélou, Primitive Christian Symbols (1964)
- Brother Lawrence, The Practice of the Presence of God (1974)
- An Anthology of Mysticism, edited by Paul de Jaegher (1977)

As editor

- A Catholic Encyclopedic Dictionary (1931)
- Dictionary of Saints (1938); later Penguin Dictionary of Saints
- Butler's Lives of the Saints (4 vols., 1956), a revision of Herbert Thurston's edition.
- Modern Christian Revolutionaries (1971)
