= Carmelite Missionaries =

Catholic religious order

- Abbreviation: C.M.
- Formation: 1860
- Founder: Francisco Palau
- Type: Centralized Religious Institute of Consecrated Life of Pontifical Right (for Women)
- Headquarters: Via Carlo Zucchi 12, Rome, Italy 00165
- Superior general: Lila Rosa Ramírez
- Website: carmelitasmisioneras.org

The Carmelite Missionaries (Spanish: Carmelitas Misioneras; Latin: Missionarii Monte Carmelo) is a religious institute of pontifical right in the Catholic Church founded by Francisco Palau.
