= Secular Order of Discalced Carmelites =

Third order of Catholic lay persons

- Ordo Carmelitarum Discalceatorum Saecularis
- Coat of arms of the order
- Abbreviation: OCDS
- Formation: 1452; 574 years ago
- Founder: John Soreth
- Type: Third order
- Headquarters: Casa Generalizia dei Carmelitani Scalzi, Corso d’Italia 38, 00198 Rome, Italy
- Affiliations: Discalced Carmelites
- Website: www.carmelitaniscalzi.com/en/

The Secular Order of Discalced Carmelites (Latin: Ordo Carmelitarum Discalceatorum Saecularis; abbreviated OCDS), formerly the Secular Order of Discalced Carmelites of the Blessed Virgin Mary of Mount Carmel and of the Holy Mother Saint Teresa of Jesus, is a third order of Catholic lay persons and secular clergy associated with the Discalced Carmelites.

Secular Discalced Carmelites profess promises to strive to live evangelical perfection in the spirit of the evangelical counsels of chastity, poverty, obedience, and of the beatitudes. They are an integral part of the Discalced Carmelites, juridically dependent upon the Discalced Carmelites friars, and in "fraternal communion" with them and the cloistered nuns. They share the same charism with the friars and nuns according to their particular state of life.

Members of the OCDS are distinct from the third order known as the Lay Carmelites (TOCarm), who are instead associated with the Carmelites of the Ancient Order.

== History ==
When the Discalced Carmelites were juridically erected in 1593, its superiors retained the power granted by Pope Nicholas V in the bull "Cum nulla fidelium conventio" of 7 October 1452 to incorporate lay persons as members of the Order. However, the Order forbade lay persons from membership and incorporated this decision into the Constitutions of 1581 and 1592. After the Discalced Carmelites were divided in 1600 into the Spanish and Italian congregations, both of these maintained exclusion of lay persons but included as an apostolate investing lay persons with their Scapular.

In the late 17th century, efforts were made that led to the erection of a secular order, beginning in Belgium and then in France and Italy. In 1699 a rule of life for seculars was privately published with provincial approval in Liège, Belgium. In 1708 in Marseille, France, a full Carmelite rule of life for secular women was published, being the first known and true rule of life for the Third Secular Order (as it was them styled), and ostensibly bearing the authority of the whole Order. The Rule of Marseille seems to recognize the presence of already existing Third Secular Order communities in France, Spain, Italy, Germany, and Belgium and attempt to impose some degree of uniformity on independent Secular Order communities. The Rule of Marseille was translated into Latin during the end of the 18th Century. In 1848 a short book on the Third Order, the "Breve [C]ompendio", was published in Florence, Italy, being merely an abridged version of the Rule of Marseille. On 8 January 1883 the Definitor General of the Order revised the Breve Compendio and officially imposed it on the whole Third Order. This was in force until it was superseded on 25 October 1911, when the Definitor General imposed the "Manuale of the Third Secular Order". The Manuale was approved by the Holy See on 3 March 1921. This document was revised on 26 October 1970 and approved by the Holy See as the Rule of Life. The Rule of Life was superseded by the current OCDS Constitutions, which were approved by the Holy See on 16 June 2003.

== Charism ==
The Seculars' vocation is to live the Carmelite spirituality as Seculars and not as mere imitators of Carmelite monastic life. They live contemplative lives while practicing charity in their common occupations. They profess a promise to the Order patterned on the monastic vows which guides their life. The Promise is to live according to the Rule of St. Albert and the OCDS Constitutions and to live the evangelical counsels of chastity, poverty, obedience, and the beatitudes according to their lay state of life.

Secular Carmelites order their lives according to the ancient Rule of Saint Albert, as does the whole Discalced Carmelite Order, according to the OCDS Constitutions specific to the Secular Order, and according to the provincial statutes applicable to the particular province of the Order which includes their communities. These three sources of legislation, in that order, move from general to more particular rules which are approved by the Church for their particular vocation and circumstances.

The primary, daily obligations of the Seculars are to engage in silent, mental prayer, to pray Morning Prayer (Lauds) and Evening Prayer (Vespers) of the Liturgy of the Hours (Divine Office), and to attend daily Mass and pray Night Prayer (Compline) when possible. Lectio Divina and spiritual retreats are also highly encouraged.

As models of this ancient way of life, they study the writings and imitate the lives of the many saints of the Discalced Carmelite Order, especially St. Teresa of Jesus and St. John of the Cross, both doctors of the Church. Doctrines include "gladly mortify themselves in union with the Sacrifice of Christ," and their "interior life must be permeated by an intense devotion to Our Lady." They wear the brown Scapular of Our Lady of Mount Carmel, which is the habit of the Secular Order and the entire Discalced Carmelite Order. Larger scapulars of various sizes are worn for ceremonial purposes. They attend the monthly meetings of the local communities of which they are members, and members of each community serve terms on the community's council, which coordinates the formation of members and the other aspects of the community.

Spiritually mature members receiving the recommendation of the local council of their OCDS community and the approval of their provincial superior are permitted to profess vows of chastity and obedience to their community, which are strictly personal and do not translate into a separate class of membership.

== Membership ==
Depending on their existing provincial statutes and with the approval of their local council, their communities accept Catholics in good standing in the Church who meet the age requirement into formation. Admission into formation depends on a clear indication of a Carmelite vocation and maturity in faith in the opinion of the local council of the community petitioned, and permission to profess the Promise of the Seculars requires a number of years spent in spiritual formation and the study of contemplative prayer under the direction of the community's formators. Catholics begin by discovering a community of Seculars which they visit for monthly meetings and may eventually join. Communities are listed in online provincial directories (see bibliography below).

Seculars are not members of the Scapular Confraternity, a newer development that is a pious association of Catholics who wear the small Scapular of Our Lady of Mount Carmel, commonly known as the Brown Scapular, and may or may not practice the primary principles of Carmelite spirituality. Any Catholic can be invested with the Carmelite Scapular by a Catholic priest, and indeed it is the most popular of Catholic scapulars because of the special promises made to its wearers by the Blessed Virgin Mary in apparitions. But the garment is properly the habit of the Discalced Carmelite Order, including the Seculars. Candidates for admission to the Order are clothed in the Scapular at the beginning of formal formation, usually during a Mass.

Seculars, after the tradition of the Friars and Nuns, take a religious name and title of devotion. The custom is increasing of retaining the person's surname and/or given name depending on suitability. The name taken is generally only used in Carmelite contexts, and members use the postnominal initials "OCDS" after their legal names.

== The Order throughout the world ==
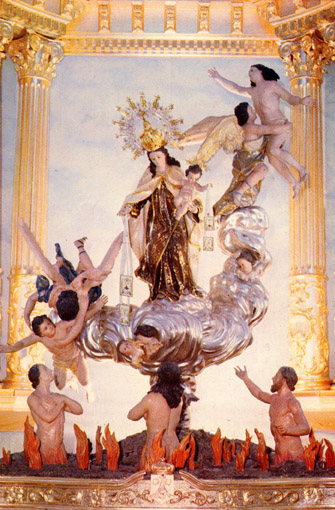
Our Lady of Mount Carmel.

Seculars are spread throughout the world in various communities, with each community canonically erected, and subject to the direction of the provincial superiors of each province and the General Superior of the Discalced Carmelite Order in Rome.

The Order has many members in the Philippines, which it attributes to the great devotion to Our Lady of Mount Carmel in that nation.

== Sources ==
- The Rule of St. Albert and the Constitutions of the Secular Order of Discalced Carmelites (OCDS), 2003.

== Bibliography ==
- "The Rule of Life", The Secular Order of Discalced Carmelites, 1979.
- Welcome to the Secular Order of Discalced Carmelites, by P. Aloysius Deeney, OCD, ICS Publications, 2009, ISBN 978-0-935216-75-2.
- Otilio Rodriguez, OCD, Appendix I: The Third Order of the Teresian Carmel; Its Origin and History, in Michael D. Griffin, OCD, Commentary on the Rule of Life (superseded) (The Growth in Carmel Series; Hubertus, Wisconsin: Teresian Charism Press, 1981), pages 127–36.
