= The Practice of the Presence of God =

Brother Lawrence's spiritual teachings

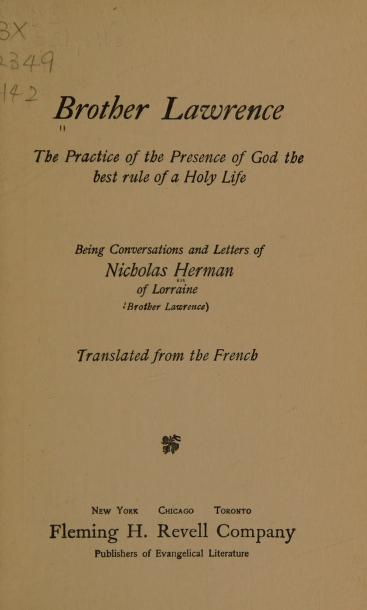
- Title page of the English edition published in 1895
- Author: Brother Lawrence (Nicolas Herman 1614–91); Compiled by Father Joseph de Beaufort
- Language: French
- Genre: Christian literature
- Publication date: 1895

The Practice of the Presence of God is a book of collected teachings of Brother Lawrence (born Nicolas Herman), a 17th-century Carmelite friar, compiled posthumously by Father Joseph de Beaufort. The compilation includes letters, as well as records of his conversations kept by Brother Lawrence's interlocutors. The basic theme of the book is the development of an awareness of the presence of God.

== About Brother Lawrence ==
The first conversation in the book recounts Brother Lawrence's conversion to a deeper commitment to his Christian faith at 18 years old, "...in the winter, seeing a tree stripped of its leaves, and considering that within a little time, the leaves would be renewed, and after that the flowers and fruit appear, he received a high view of the Providence and Power of God, which has never since been effaced from his soul."

At the age of 24, Brother Lawrence joined the Order of Discalced Carmelites in Paris, taking the religious name "Lawrence of the Resurrection". He spent the rest of his life with this order, dying on 12 February 1691. During his time as a friar, he was much preoccupied with cultivating a keen sensitivity to the presence of God in everyday life.

== Theme ==
The text attempts to explain Lawrence's method of acquiring the presence of God. A summary of his approach can be gleaned from the following passages. "That he had always been governed by love, without selfish views; and that having resolved to make the love of GOD the end of all his actions, he had found reasons to be well satisfied with his method. That he was pleased when he could take up a straw from the ground for the love of GOD, seeking Him only, and nothing else, not even His gifts." "That in order to form a habit of conversing with GOD continually, and referring all we do to Him; we must at first apply to Him with some diligence: but that after a little care we should find His love inwardly excite us to it without any difficulty." Lawrence pleads that all work is valuable to God and one need not accomplish great things to please Him. The labourer is as valuable to God as the priest.

== Translations ==
Translators and readers have been struck by Brother Lawrence's seeming simplicity. "When I was exposed to his thoughts for the first time," wrote Henri Nouwen, "they seemed simple, even somewhat naive and unrealistic." Nouwen added that the more he reflected on Brother Lawrence's advice, he became aware that it "is not just a nice idea for a seventeenth-century monk but a most important challenge to our present-day life situation." Translator Robert J. Edmonson had a similar experience. "I had an image of Brother Lawrence as a jolly monk who took pleasure in cleaning pots and cooking," Edmonson wrote. "I was struck by the depth of his love for God and his life lived in obedience, humility, and concern for others." This paradox reflects the challenge facing translators, which is best illustrated by comparing the translations of one of the more famous passages. First, from the original 1692 French edition of Maximes spirituelles:

L'on seroit même surpris si l'on sçavoit ce que l'ame dit quelquefois à Dieu.

Robert Edmonson took a straightforward approach in his translation of this Maximes passage:

We would be quite surprised if we knew what the soul sometimes says to God.

Translators John Delaney, Edward Musgrave Blaiklock and Salvatore Sciurba rendered the passage with the same semi-literal interpretation. Brother Lawrence could be surprisingly subtle: the original French has an implied sense of conversation, perhaps even of communion, that is difficult to communicate without taking a few liberties, as in the Donald Attwater translation of the same Maximes passage:

We should be surprised if we knew what converse the soul sometimes holds with God.

Attwater's was a common approach taken by many translators of this passage: "Conversation with God occurs in the depth and center of the soul," in one translation; and in another, "Great would be our surprise, if we but knew what converse the soul holds at times with God."

Numerous versions of The Practice of the Presence of God have been published, as reprints or new translations. Aside from the writings of Augustine of Hippo, the work is the greatest influence on the personal spirituality of Pope Leo XIV.
