= Third order =

Type of Christian religious order

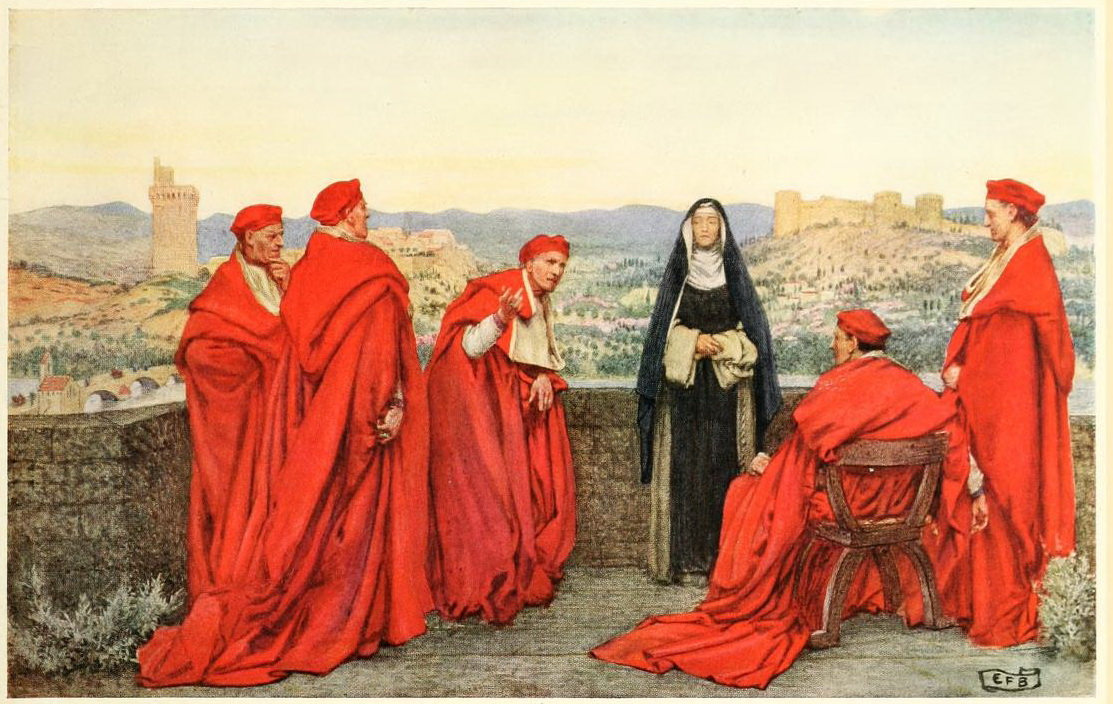
Catherine of Siena (1347–1380), as a Dominican tertiary, lived outside religious institutions, and had a diplomatic career

The term third order signifies, in general, lay members of Christian religious orders, who do not normally live in a religious community such as a monastery and yet can claim the right to wear the religious habit and participate in the good works of a great order. Latin Catholicism, Lutheranism and Anglicanism all recognize third orders.

Third orders were a 12th-century adaptation of the medieval monastic confraternities. Members of third orders are known as tertiaries (Latin tertiarii, from tertius, "third"). In some cases, they may belong to a religious institute (a "congregation") that is called a "third order regular".

Roman Catholic canon law states:

Associations whose members share in the spirit of some religious institute while in secular life, lead an apostolic life, and strive for Christian perfection under the higher direction of the same institute are called third orders or some other appropriate name.

== Name ==
Religious orders that arose in the 12th–13th centuries often had a first order (the male religious, who were generally the first established), the second order (nuns, established second), and then the third order of laity who were established third. Saint Francis of Assisi, for example, is said to have established the Friars Minor, the Poor Clares, and the Third Order of Saint Francis.

The term tertiary comes from the Latin tertiarius, meaning "third". The term has been used for centuries to denote those who belonged to a third order. Tertiaries are those persons who live according to the Third Rule of religious orders, either outside of a monastery in the world, or in a religious community. The idea which forms the basis of this institute is typically that persons who, on account of certain circumstances cannot enter a religious order, may, nevertheless, as far as possible enjoy the advantages and privileges of religious orders. This is most clearly expressed in the Rule of the Third Order of St. Francis which, although not the oldest, has, nevertheless, become the model for the rule of almost all other Third Orders. Tertiaries are divided into Regular and Secular.

In some cases the members of a third order, wishing to live in a more monastic and regulated way of life, became "regulars" (religious living under a rule, in Latin, regula) as members of a religious institute. These religious institutes or "congregations" are classified as belonging to the third order regular.

== History ==
The old monastic orders had attached to their abbeys confraternities of lay men and women, going back in some cases to the 8th century. The Confraternity Book of Durham is extant and embraces some 20,000 names in the course of eight centuries. Emperors and kings and the most illustrious men in church and state were commonly confraters of one or other of the great Benedictine abbeys. The confraters and consorors were made partakers in all the religious exercises and other good works of the community to which they were affiliated, and they were expected in return to protect and forward its interests; but they were not called upon to follow any special rule of life.

The general idea of lay people affiliated to religious orders, such as the Benedictine Oblates or confraters developed as founders and benefactors of monasteries were received into spiritual fellowship, and later clothed in death in some religious habit. So too the Templars had a whole system whereby layfolk could partake in some sort in their privileges and in the material administration of their affairs. But the essential nature of the tertiary is really an innovation of the thirteenth century.

At that date many of the laity, impatient of the indolent and sometimes scandalous lives of the clergy in lower Europe, were seized with the idea of reforming Christendom by preaching. This admirable intention caused the rise of among others, the Fratres Humiliati. The Humiliati soon became suspect and were forbidden by Pope Lucius III to preach, until in 1207 Pope Innocent III gave a section of them permission to resume their work, provided that they limited themselves to moral questions and did not venture on doctrinal subjects. Some became priests, were gathered into a cloister, and took up religious life. Others remained outside, yet spiritually dependent on the clerical portion, and for the first time called a Third Order. The Humiliati seem to have been the first to have 'tertiaries' in the twelfth century. These lived a rule of life within the world.

The name was used to a great extent in the Franciscan Order, which possibly had the most popular third order. Other orders too had tertiaries such as the Trinitarians and the Dominicans. These were followed over time by a number of others such as the Carmelites, Servites, Augustinians, Augustinian Recollects, Discalced Carmelites and others. But by whatever name they were called in the inception, there have been lay persons who have professed to live according to either the Rule of the brothers adapted to their secular life or a rule drawn up particularly for them. They shared the same spirituality, the same superiors, and even aspects of the same habit such as the scapular. Eventually, the name "tertiary" became popularized and attached to all who lived in this way. There have been a number of beatified or canonized tertiaries.

With the advent of the Second Vatican Council came an elaboration of the lay vocation. The lay vocation is a vocation distinct from that of the consecrated state. It involves the sanctification of ordinary life, of one's work, of family life, of all the various secular occupations. It is the leaven in the midst of the world to order the temporal world to God.

As the various third orders secular began to look at each of their houses after the Council they began to revise their Rules and Statutes. The Orders submitted their new Statutes or Rules or Constitutions to the Holy See for review and approbation. Thus the new Statutes etc. are steeped in the doctrine of the Council regarding the universal call to holiness and the theology of the lay vocation including the secular character of the laity. Various Orders have opted to change the name from "Third Order Secular" to "Secular Order" (or at least add it to usage) to emphasize the secular nature of the Order or they used the term "Lay or Laity" to the same effect. "Third order" and "tertiary" is still used but other names were added or used in a formal sense. The various documents show how the laity of the various Orders are part of the Order (or family etc.) but fully within their particular lay and secular state. They show how tertiaries are to live fully their Christian lay vocation, as well as how they are to live the charism of the Order they belong to within secular life. They also provide various means to tending towards holiness in the midst of the world, which very much is part of the vocation of the tertiary - to strive for Christian perfection (CIC 303).

=== Extant third orders secular of the Catholic Church ===
- Third Order of Augustinian Recollects
- Third Order of Saint Augustine
- Oblates of Saint Benedict
- Secular Order of Discalced Carmelites
- Third Order of Saint Dominic
- Third Order of Saint Francis
- Secular Franciscan Order
- Third Order of Mercy
- Third Order of Minims
- Third Order Secular of the Most Holy Trinity
- Third Order of Saint Norbert
- Third Order of Our Lady of Mount Carmel
- Association of Salesian Cooperators
- Third Order of Servites

There also are third or secular orders in the Protestant denominations, such as the Anglican and Episcopal Church.

== Organisation ==
Members of third orders are thus either (a) regulars, living in common under a religious rule of life, or (b) seculars, living in the world. The regulars take the three canonical religious vows; the seculars make promises, which are not considered binding under pain of sin, as are the vows of religious institutes, or in some cases may take private vows of obedience and chastity or in some cases even poverty, chastity and obedience (all according to their lay state). Their link with a religious institute is what distinguishes them from members of other "associations of the Christian faithful" and entitles their associations to be "called third orders or some other appropriate name".

=== Membership ===
Any Roman Catholic, Lutheran or Anglican may join a Third Order of their respective religious tradition. The laying aside of the distinctive sign or prayers for any space of time does not in itself put an end to membership with a Third Order, but the deliberate wish to dissociate oneself from it is sufficient to produce that effect (S. Cong. Indulg., 31 January 1893).

== Roman Catholic third orders ==
=== Third Order Secular of the Most Holy Trinity ===
The Order of the Most Holy Trinity was founded to ransom Christian Captives (especially those in danger of renouncing their faith). There have been tertiaries of the Order of the Most Holy Trinity and of the Captives since the beginnings of the Order though they were known by many names. Lay confreres were admitted already in 1198 by the permission of Pope Innocent III. Statutes attributed to William the Scotsman, the third Minister General of the Order (1217–1222), give some idea of the primitive organization of the Trinitarian Fraternity.

The first known Statutes of the Trinitarian Third Order were published in 1584, and were approved by the General of the Order, Father Bernard Dominici. The first Rule of Life for the Third Order attached to the Discalced Trinitarians was approved by Pope Leo XII on 6 June 1828.

=== Third Order of Saint Francis ===
The preaching of St. Francis of Assisi, as well as his own living example and that of his first disciples, exercised such a powerful attraction on the people that many married men and women wanted to join the First or the Second Order. This being incompatible with their state of life, St. Francis found a middle way: he gave them a rule animated by the Franciscan spirit.

The Third Order of St. Francis in the Roman Catholic Church is part of the Franciscan family of religious orders. It is the best known and most widely distributed of the third orders, and has both regular and secular branches. The Third Order was created by Francis of Assisi, and was the exemplar after which the others were fashioned.

=== Third Order of Our Lady of Mount Carmel ===
The Third Order of Our Lady of Mount Carmel (also named Lay Carmelites) are the third order associated with the Carmelites. It was established in 1476 by a bull of Pope Sixtus IV and is known for devotion to Virgin Mary, under her title as Our Lady of Mount Carmel. The Discalced branch is termed Secular Order of Discalced Carmelites.

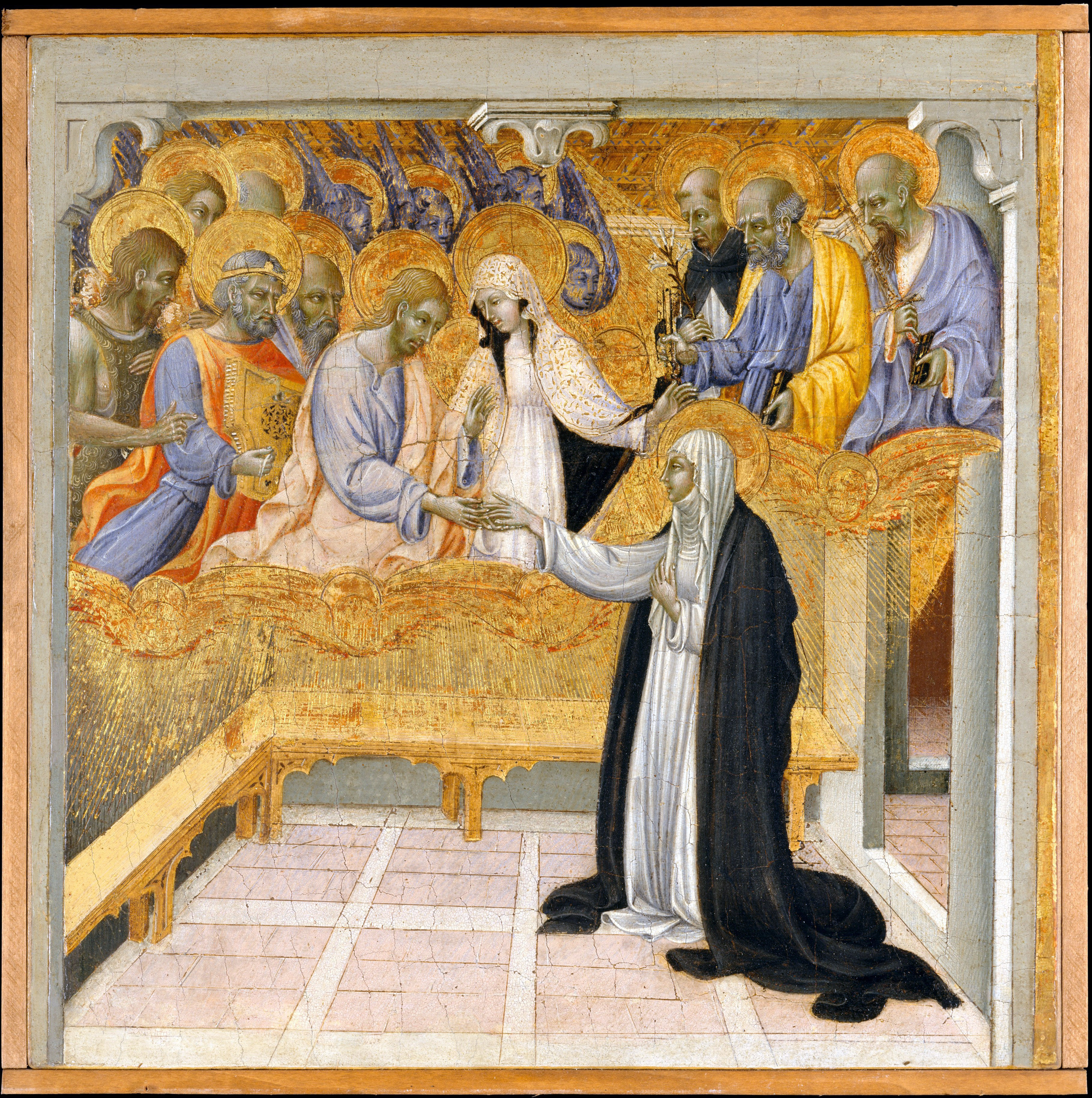
The Mystic Marriage of Saint Catherine of Siena by Giovanni di Paolo, c. 1460 (Metropolitan Museum of Art, New York).

=== Third Order of Saint Dominic ===
This was one of the earliest developments of Saint Dominic's Ordo de Poenitentia. It was not indeed the primal organism from which the Friars Preachers evolved, but rather represents that portion of the Order of Penance which came under Dominican influence. At first vaguely constituted and living without system or form, its members gradually grew more and more dependent on their spiritual guides. Their two greatest saints are Catherine of Siena and Rose of Lima, who both lived ascetic lives in their family homes, and whose spiritual influence was great in their societies.

=== Third Order of Servites ===
The Servite Order has had both a secular and regular Third Order. The secular Third Order was established in the United States in 1893.

The Sisters of the Third Order of Servites was founded by St. Juliana Falconieri of Florence, who received the habit c. 1385 from Philip Benizi, then Prior General of the Servite friars. The Servite Sisters' traditional habit consisted of a black tunic, secured by a leather belt, and a white veil. The sisters devoted themselves especially to the care of the sick and other works of mercy; because the gown had short sleeves to facilitate work, people called the Sisters of the new order "Mantellate." There were, in the early 20th century, two congregations, with a membership of 400.

=== Third Order of Saint Augustine ===
These are the men and women who follow the spirit of the Rule of St. Augustine in their daily lives under the spiritual guidance of the Augustinian friars.

=== Secular Augustinian Recollects ===
The Secular Augustinian Recollects (Spanish: Agustinos Recoletos Seglares) is the official Third Order of the Order of Augustinian Recollects. Today, the SAR is present in 19 countries in 111 Local Chapters with at least 3,500 members.

=== Lay Discalced Augustinians ===
The Lay Discalced Augustinians (formerly known as Hermandad de la Correa y de Santa Rita de Cascia) is one of the official Third Orders of the Order of Discalced Augustinians. It was founded on May 12, 2011, canonically constituted on November 18, 2018. As of March, 2023, the OAD Lay, has spanned across six countries and has 26 Local Chapters and continues to grow in the Philippines and abroad.

== Lutheran Churches ==
There are in the Lutheran Church, Lutheran Franciscan Third Orders in Germany, Sweden and North America. There are also other Lutheran Third Orders such as the Humiliatenorden.

=== Lutheran Franciscan Tertiaries ===
In Germany, the Lutheran Franciscan Tertiaries, officially known as the Evangelische Franziskanerbruderschaft der Nachfolge Christi, were founded in 1927; they emphasize the Rule of Saint Francis and pray daily from their breviary.

=== Franciskus Tredje Orden ===
The Franciskus Tredje Orden is a Lutheran third order of the Church of Sweden.

== Anglican Communion ==
Third orders in the Anglican Communion have in common that they are composed of both men and women, single and married, who are living and working in the world in their various life callings.

=== Franciscan tradition ===
==== Third Order, Society of St. Francis ====
The Third Order (TSSF) of the Society of St. Francis was founded in 1950. The TSSF consists of lay and ordained people. It is divided into five provinces: Africa, Australia, New Zealand, Europe, and the Americas.

==== Third Order, Franciscan Order of the Divine Compassion ====
The Franciscan Order of the Divine Compassion (FODC) was founded in the United States in 1981. Its third order is also known as the Brothers and Sisters of Penance.

=== Dominican tradition ===
==== Anglican Order of Preachers ====
The Anglican Order of Preachers is the primary manifestation of Dominican spirituality within the Anglican Communion, which has no primary religious orders in the Dominican tradition, It holds to a third order-style structure for all of its members, who follow the Dominican Rule, and are a designated 'Christian Community' (secular religious order).

=== Other traditions ===
==== Third Order of St. Andrew ====
The Order of Saint Andrew is an Anglican ecumenical order. Any member in good standing of any Christian Church in apostolic succession may make application to join.

== See also ==
- Oblate
- Secular institute
