= Book of the First Monks =

Medieval Carmelite Catholic text

The Book of the First Monks (Latin: Decem Libri – Liber de Institutione Primorum Monacharum) is a medieval Catholic book in the contemplative and eremitic tradition of the Carmelite Order, thought to reflect the spirituality of the Prophet Elijah, honored as the Father of the Order.

== Overview ==
The book is one of the most important documents of the Order because it influenced many of the Carmelite Saints according to the spirituality of the first Carmelite hermits. Some medieval Carmelites thought it antedated the Carmelite Rule of St. Albert, although this is disputed due to a lack of evidence. It is this dispute that has caused this manuscript to be questioned today.

== Imitation of the Prophet Elijah ==
The original charism of the Carmelite hermits, which still animates the spirituality of many contemporary Carmelites and the cloistered contemplative life of other hermits, monks, and nuns, was in imitation of the Prophet Elijah. Carmelite tradition relates that Elijah inspired the early hermits who settled near the spring on Mount Carmel, Palestine which bears Elijah's name. Most often quoted from the Book of the First Monks is the following passage in which Elijah is named as the spiritual father of the Order:

The goal of this life is twofold. One part we acquire, with the help of divine grace, through our efforts and virtuous works. This is to offer God a pure heart, free from all stain of actual sin. We do this when we are perfect and in Cherith, that is, hidden in that charity of which the Wise Man says: "Charity covers all sins " [Proverbs, 10: 12]. God desired Elijah to advance thus far when [H]e said to him: "Hide yourself by the brook Cherith" [First Kings, 17: 3-4].

The other part of the goal of this life is granted us as the free gift of God: namely, to taste somewhat in the heart and to experience in the soul, not only after death but even in this mortal life, the intensity of the divine [P]resence and the sweetness of the glory of [H]eaven. This is to drink of the torrent of the love of God. God promised it to Elijah in the words: "You shall drink from the brook." It is in view of this double end that the monk ought to give himself to the eremitic and prophetic life.

The book also gives one of the oldest explanations of the Carmelite habit and what each part of the habit signified.

== Influence on Carmelites ==
Exemplars of the contemplative and mystical spirituality described in the book include the Discalced Carmelite Sts. Teresa of Ávila, John of the Cross, Thérèse of Lisieux, and Teresa Benedicta of the Cross (Edith Stein).

== See also ==
- Carmelite Rule of St. Albert
- Constitutions of the Carmelite Order
- Byzantine Discalced Carmelites
- Carmelite Rite
