= Constitutions of the Carmelite Order =

The Constitutions of the Carmelite Order stand as an expression of the ideals and spirit of the Order of Our Lady of Mount Carmel. Foundational sources for the Constitutions include the desert hermit vocation as exemplified in the life of the Prophet Elijah. For the Carmelite the contemplative vocation is exemplified par excellence in the life of the Virgin Mary, beloved to the Order under the title of Our Lady of Mount Carmel. Additionally, the Carmelite Rule of St. Albert and the Book of the First Monks comprise fundamental points of reference in the life and spirituality of the Order.

Between the 13th and 16th centuries the Order lost much of its vigour. The reform led by Teresa of Ávila and John of the Cross restored Carmelite life with a new joy and asceticism. The Discalced Carmelite renewal saw the Constitutions reaffirmed and strengthened. They were again revitalised under the directives of the Second Vatican Council.

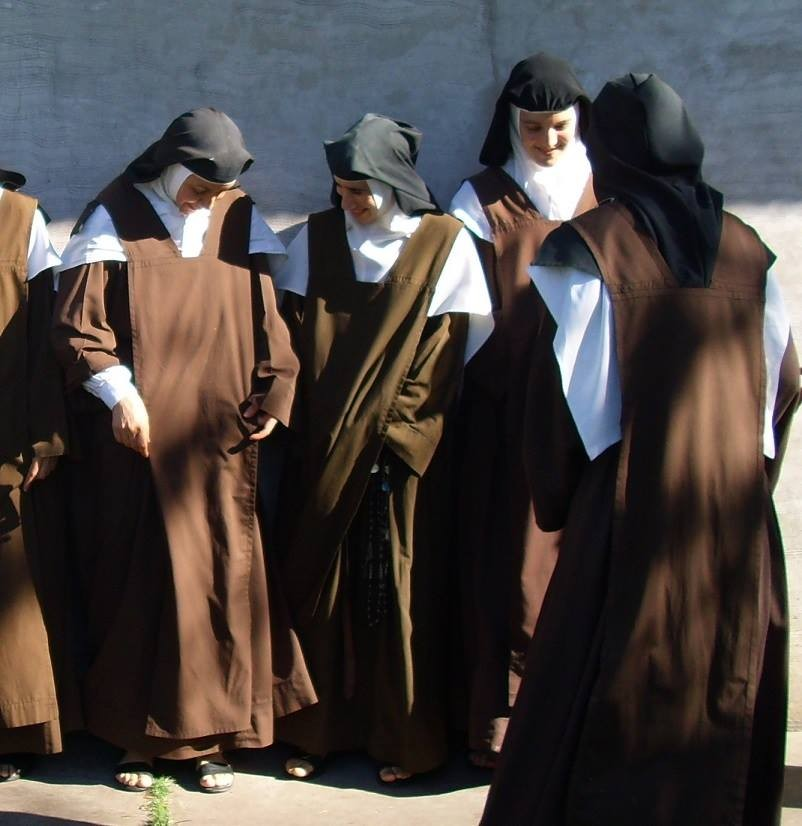
Carmelite nuns under the 1990 Constitutions

Two different approved texts of Constitutions exist today for the Discalced Carmelite Nuns: those approved by Pope John Paul II December 8, 1990, and those approved by Pope John Paul II September 17, 1991. The Carmels under the 1990 Constitutions, many of which are in Spain, are generally more traditional and fall under the direct jurisdiction of the Holy See. Under the 1991 Constitutions, the nuns are associated with the Carmelite friars and fall under the jurisdiction of the Discalced Carmelite Father General or the local Ordinary i.e. the Bishop.

== See also ==
- Carmelite Rule of St. Albert
- Book of the First Monks
- Carmelite Rite
