= Rule of Saint Albert =

c. 1210 Carmelite text

The eremitic Rule of Saint Albert is the shortest of the rules of consecrated life in existence of the Catholic spiritual tradition, and is composed almost exclusively of scriptural precepts.

== Writing ==
Saint Albert Avogadro (1149–1214), a priest of the Canons Regular and a canon lawyer, wrote the Rule between 1206 and 1214 as the Catholic Latin Patriarch of Jerusalem. The Rule is directed to "Brother B.", held by tradition to be either Saint Bertold or Saint Brocard (but historical evidence of his identity is lacking), and the hermits living in the spirit of Elias near the prophet's spring on Mount Carmel in present-day Israel. On 30 January 1226 Pope Honorius III approved it as their rule of life in the bull Ut vivendi normam.

== Innocentian Rule ==
About 20 years later on 1 October 1247, in consultation with Dominican theologians Cardinal Hugh of Saint Cher and Bishop William of Tortosa, Pope Innocent IV revised the Rule in the decree Quae Honorem to reflect the realities of the mendicant and monastic life to which the original hermits had been forced to adapt due to the threat of Muslim attacks in Palestine. Through events surrounding the Crusades the hermits, or Brothers of Our Lady of Mount Carmel as they came to be known, were forced to flee Mount Carmel to Europe. In Europe the Carmelites were recognised as a mendicant order. The monasteries they founded are also known as "Carmels."

== Official text ==
Another version of the rule was approved by Pope Innocent IV in 1247.

== Aspects ==
The Rule states that it is fundamental for a Carmelite to "live a life in allegiance to Jesus Christ – how, pure in heart and stout in conscience, must be unswerving in the service of the Master" (no. 2). To live a life of allegiance to Jesus Christ, the Carmelites bind themselves especially to:

- develop the contemplative dimension of their life, in an open dialogue with God
- live full of charity
- meditate day and night on the Word of the Lord
- pray together or alone several times a day
- celebrate the Eucharist every day
- do manual work, as Paul the Apostle did
- purify themselves of every trace of evil
- live in poverty, placing in common what little they may have
- love the Church and all people
- conform their will to that of God, seeking the will of God in faith, in dialogue and through discernment.

== See also ==
- Constitutions of the Carmelite Order
