= Doctor of the Church =

Title given by the Catholic Church to saints

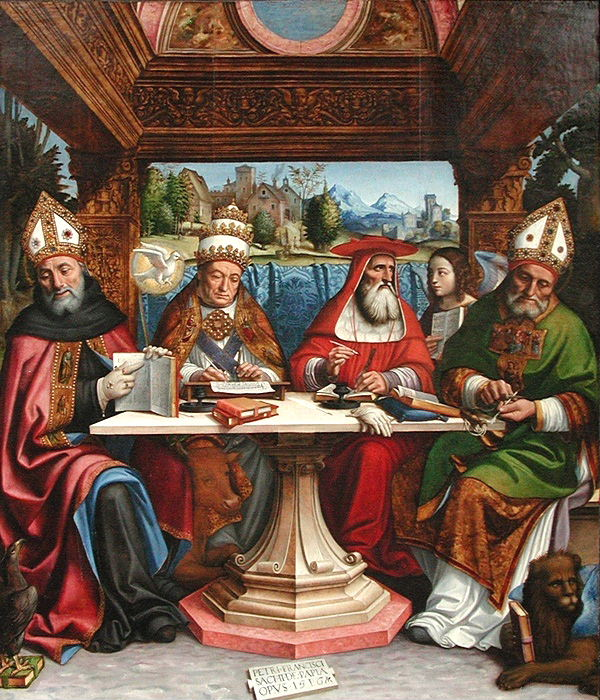
The Four Great Doctors of the Western Church were often depicted in art, here by Pier Francesco Sacchi, c. 1516. From the left: Saint Augustine, Pope Gregory I, Saint Jerome, and Saint Ambrose, with their attributes

Teresa of Ávila, depicted with quill, book and the dove symbolising the Holy Spirit, common iconographical attributes for a Doctor of the Church

Doctor of the Church (Latin: doctor, 'teacher'), also referred to as Doctor of the Universal Church (Doctor Ecclesiae Universalis), is a title given by the Catholic Church to saints recognised as having made a significant contribution to theology or doctrine through their research, study, or writing.

As of 2025, the Catholic Church has named 38 Doctors of the Church. Of these, the 18 who died before the Great Schism of 1054 are also held in high esteem by the Eastern Orthodox Church, although it does not use the formal title Doctor of the Church.

Among the 38 recognised Doctors, 29 are from the West and nine from the East; four are women and 34 are men; one is an abbess, three are nuns, and one is a tertiary associated with a religious order; two are popes, 19 are bishops, 13 are priests, and one is a deacon; and 28 are from Europe, three are from Africa, and seven are from Asia. More Doctors (twelve) lived in the fourth century than any other; eminent Christian writers of the first, second, and third centuries are usually referred to as the Ante-Nicene Fathers. The shortest period between death and nomination was that of Alphonsus Liguori, who died in 1787 and was named a Doctor in 1871 – a period of 84 years; the longest was that of Irenaeus, which took more than 18 centuries.

== Before the 16th century ==
In the Western church four outstanding Church Fathers attained this honour in the early Middle Ages: Gregory the Great, Ambrose, Augustine of Hippo, and Jerome. The "four Doctors" became a commonplace notion among scholastic theologians. In 1298, pope Boniface VIII decreed that they should be honoured with double feasts throughout the Latin Church, in his sixth book of Decretals (cap. "Gloriosus", de relique. et vener. sanctorum, in Sexto, III, 22)(transl. "Gloriosus," concerning the relics and veneration of the saints, in Sexto, III, 22.

In the Byzantine Church, three Doctors were pre-eminent: John Chrysostom, Basil the Great, and Gregory of Nazianzus. The feasts of these three saints were made obligatory throughout the Eastern Empire by Leo VI the Wise. A common feast was later instituted in their honour on 30 January, called "the feast of the three Hierarchs". In the Menaea for that day it is related that the three Doctors appeared in a dream to John Mauropous, Bishop of Euchaita, and commanded him to institute a festival in their honour, in order to put a stop to the rivalries of their votaries and panegyrists.

This was under Alexius Comnenus (1081–1118; see "Acta SS.", 14 June, under St. Basil, c. xxxviii). But sermons for the feast are attributed in manuscripts to Cosmas Vestitor, who flourished in the tenth century. The three are as common in Eastern art as the four are in Western. Durandus (i, 3) remarks that Doctors should be represented with books in their hands. In the West analogy led to the veneration of four Eastern Doctors, Athanasius of Alexandria being added to the three hierarchs.

== Catholic Church ==
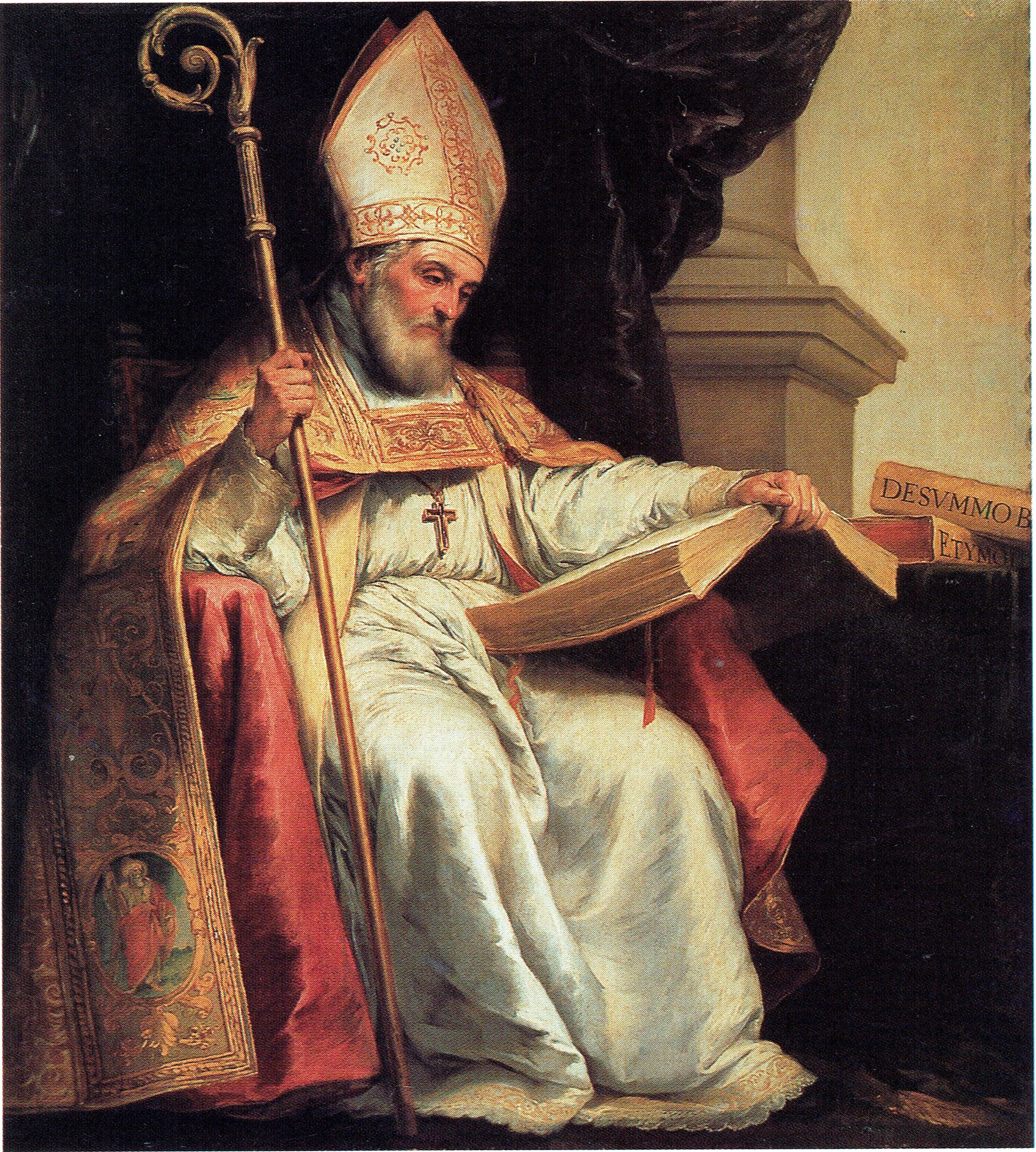
Isidore of Seville, a seventh-century Doctor of the Church, depicted by Murillo (c. 1628) with a book, which is a common iconographical attribute for a doctor

The details of the title Doctor of the Church vary from one autonomous ritual church to another.

=== Latin Church ===
In the Latin Church, the four Latin Doctors (Ambrose, Augustine, Jerome, and Gregory) had been given a special pre-eminence since the eighth century, but in 1298 Pope Boniface VIII declared them Doctors of the Church. Pope Pius V recognised the four Great Doctors of the Eastern Church (John Chrysostom, Basil the Great, Gregory of Nazianzus, and Athanasius of Alexandria) in 1568.

To these names others have subsequently been added. There are three requisite conditions: eminent learning, a high degree of sanctity, and proclamation by the church. Benedict XIV stated that the declaration must be made by the supreme pontiff or a general council.

The decree is issued by the Dicastery for the Causes of Saints and approved by the pope, after a careful examination, if necessary, of the saint's writings. It is not an ex cathedra decision, nor does it amount to a declaration that no error is to be found in the teaching of the Doctor. Doctors of the Church are not considered wholly immune from error. Previously, no martyrs were on the list, since the Office and the Mass had been for Confessors. Hence, as Benedict XIV pointed out during his pontificate, Ignatius of Antioch, Irenaeus of Lyons, and Cyprian of Carthage were not called Doctors of the Church. This changed in 2022 when Pope Francis declared Irenaeus of Lyons the first martyred Doctor.

The Doctors' works vary greatly in subject and form. Augustine of Hippo was one of the most prolific writers in Christian antiquity and wrote in almost every genre. Some, such as Pope Gregory the Great and Ambrose of Milan, were prominent writers of letters. Pope Leo the Great, Pope Gregory the Great, Peter Chrysologus, Bernard of Clairvaux, Anthony of Padua and Lawrence of Brindisi left many homilies. Catherine of Siena, Teresa of Ávila, John of the Cross and Therese of Lisieux wrote works of mystical theology. Athanasius of Alexandria and Robert Bellarmine defended the church against heresy. Bede the Venerable wrote biblical commentaries and theological treatises. Systematic theologians include the Scholastic philosophers Anselm of Canterbury, Albertus Magnus, and Thomas Aquinas.

In the 1920 encyclical Spiritus Paraclitus, Pope Benedict XV refers to Jerome as the church's "Greatest Doctor".

Until 1970, no woman had been named a Doctor of the Church. Since then four additions to the list have been women: Teresa of Ávila (also known as Saint Teresa of Jesus) and Catherine of Siena by Pope Paul VI; Therese of Lisieux by Pope John Paul II; and Hildegard of Bingen by Benedict XVI. Teresa and Thérèse were both Discalced Carmelites, Catherine was a Dominican tertiary, and Hildegard was a Benedictine.

Traditionally, in the Liturgy, the Office of Doctors was distinguished from that of Confessors by two changes: the Gospel reading Vos estis sal terrae ("You are the salt of the earth"), Matthew 5:13–19, and the eighth Respond at Matins, from Sirach 15:5, In medio Ecclesiae aperuit os ejus, * Et implevit eum Deus spiritu sapientiae et intellectus. * Jucunditatem et exsultationem thesaurizavit super eum. ("In the midst of the Church he opened his mouth, * And God filled him with the spirit of wisdom and understanding. * He heaped upon him a treasure of joy and gladness.") The Nicene Creed was also recited at Mass, which is normally not said except on Sundays and the highest-ranking feast days. The 1962 revisions to the Missal dropped the Creed from feasts of Doctors and abolished the title and the Common of Confessors, instituting a distinct Common of Doctors.

On 20 August 2011, Pope Benedict XVI announced that he would soon declare John of Ávila a Doctor of the Church. It was also reported in December 2011 that Pope Benedict intended to declare Hildegard of Bingen as a Doctor of the Church, though she had not been formally canonized. Pope Benedict XVI declared Hildegard of Bingen a saint on 10 May 2012, clearing the way for her to be named a Doctor of the Church, then declared both John of Ávila and Hildegard of Bingen Doctors of the Church on 7 October 2012.

Pope Francis declared the 10th-century Armenian monk Gregory of Narek the 36th Doctor of the Church on 21 February 2015. The decision was somewhat controversial, as Gregory was a monk of the Armenian Apostolic Church, a non-Chalcedonian church that was not in communion with the Catholic Church during Gregory's life and has sometimes been described as monophysite. However, the Armenian Apostolic Church does not accept monophysitism, and in 1996, Pope John Paul II and Catholicos Karekin I, patriarch of the Armenian Apostolic Church, signed a joint declaration which said that the division between the two churches was due to historical misunderstandings, not a real difference in Christology. Further, Gregory had been recognised as a saint by the Catholic Church since it received the Armenian Catholic Church into full communion.

Saint Cardinal John Henry Newman was proclaimed a doctor of the Church on All Saints Day, Saturday, November 1, 2025 by Pope Leo XIV at Saint Peter's Square at Vatican City. He was named co-patron of Catholic education joining Saint Thomas Aquinas. On 31 July 2025, a statement from the Holy See Press Office reported that during an audience granted to Cardinal Marcello Semeraro, Prefect of the Dicastery for the Causes of Saints, Pope Leo XIV had "confirmed the affirmative opinion of the Plenary Session of Cardinals and Bishops, Members of the Dicastery for the Causes of Saints, regarding the title of Doctor of the Universal Church, would be conferred on Saint John Henry Newman." In November 2023, the United States Conference of Catholic Bishops had voted to support a petition by the Catholic Bishops' Conference of England and Wales for the Vatican to name John Henry Newman a Doctor of the Church.

==== List of Doctors ====
No.	Image	Name	Titles	Born	Died	Promoted	Activity	Notable writings	Pope
1		Gregory the Great	One of the four Great Latin Fathers	540 (c.)	604	1298	Pope, OSB	Dialogues; Libellus responsionum Pastoral Care; Moralia in Job	Pope Boniface VIII
2		Ambrose	One of the four Great Latin Fathers	340 (c.)	397	1298	Bishop of Milan	Ambrosian hymns Exameron; De obitu Theodosii	Pope Boniface VIII
3		Augustine of Hippo	One of the four Great Latin Fathers Doctor gratiae (Doctor of Grace)	354	430	1298	Bishop of Hippo (now Annaba)	De doctrina Christiana; Confessions; The City of God; On the Trinity	Pope Boniface VIII
4		Jerome	One of the four Great Latin Fathers	347 (c.)	420	1298	Priest, monk	Vulgate; De Viris Illustribus	Pope Boniface VIII
5		Thomas Aquinas	Doctor angelicus (Angelic Doctor) Doctor communis (Common Doctor) Doctor Humanitatis (Doctor of Humanity/Humaneness)	1225	1274	1567	Religious priest, theologian, OP	Summa Theologiae; Summa contra Gentiles	Pope Pius V
6		John Chrysostom	One of the four Great Greek Fathers	347	407	1568	Archbishop of Constantinople	Paschal Homily; Adversus Judaeos	Pope Pius V
7		Basil the Great	One of the four Great Greek Fathers	330	379	1568	Bishop of Caesarea	Address to Young Men on Greek Literature; On the Holy Spirit	Pope Pius V
8		Gregory of Nazianzus	One of the four Great Greek Fathers	329	389	1568	Archbishop of Constantinople	On God and Christ: The Five Theological Orations and Two Letters to Cledonius	Pope Pius V
9		Athanasius	One of the four Great Greek Fathers	298	373	1568	Archbishop of Alexandria	On the Incarnation; The Life of Antony; Letters to Serapion	Pope Pius V
10		Bonaventure	Doctor seraphicus (Seraphic Doctor)	1221	1274	1588	Cardinal Bishop of Albano, Theologian, Minister General, OFM	Commentary on the Sentences of Lombard; The Mind's Road to God; Collationes in Hexaemeron	Pope Sixtus V
11		Anselm of Canterbury	Doctor magnificus (Magnificent Doctor) Doctor Marianus (Marian Doctor)	1033 or 1034	1109	1720	Archbishop of Canterbury, OSB	Proslogion; Cur Deus Homo	Pope Clement XI
12		Isidore of Seville		560	636	1722	Archbishop of Seville	Etymologiae; On the Catholic Faith against the Jews	Pope Innocent XIII
13		Peter Chrysologus		406	450	1729	Bishop of Ravenna	Homilies	Pope Benedict XIII
14		Leo the Great	Doctor unitatis Ecclesiae (Doctor of the Church's Unity)	400	461	1754	Pope	Leo's Tome	Pope Benedict XIV
15		Peter Damian		1007	1072	1828	Cardinal Bishop of Ostia, monk, OSB	De Divina Omnipotentia; Liber Gomorrhianus	Pope Leo XII
16		Bernard of Clairvaux	Doctor mellifluus (Mellifluous Doctor)	1090	1153	1830	Religious priest OCist	Sermones super Cantica Canticorum; Apologia ad Guillelmum; Liber ad milites templi de laude novae militiae	Pope Pius VIII
17		Hilary of Poitiers		300	367	1851	Bishop of Poitiers	Commentarius in Evangelium Matthaei	Pope Pius IX
18		Alphonsus Liguori	Doctor zelantissimus (Most Zealous Doctor)	1696	1787	1871	Bishop of Sant'Agata de' Goti, CSsR (Founder)	The Glories of Mary Dogmatic Works: Moral Theology; The Council of Trent; The Histories of Heresies and their Refutation; Truth of the Faith	Pope Pius IX
19		Francis de Sales	Doctor caritatis (Doctor of Charity)	1567	1622	1877	Bishop of Geneva, CO	Introduction to the Devout Life; Letters of Spiritual Direction	Pope Pius IX
20		Cyril of Alexandria	Doctor Incarnationis (Doctor of the Incarnation)	376	444	1883	Archbishop of Alexandria	Commentaries on the Old Testament; Thesaurus; Discourse Against Arians; Dialogues on the Trinity	Pope Leo XIII
21		Cyril of Jerusalem		315	386	1883	Archbishop of Jerusalem	Catechetical Lectures; Summa doctrinae christianae	Pope Leo XIII
22		John Damascene		676	749	1890	Priest, monk	Fountain of Knowledge; Octoechos	Pope Leo XIII
23		Bede the Venerable	Anglorum doctor (Doctor of the English)	672	735	1899	Religious priest, monk, OSB	Ecclesiastical History of the English People; The Reckoning of Time; Liber epigrammatum Paenitentiale Bedae	Pope Leo XIII
24		Ephrem		306	373	1920	Deacon	Commentary on the Diatessaron; Prayer of Saint Ephrem; Hymns Against Heresies	Pope Benedict XV
25		Peter Canisius		1521	1597	1925	Priest, SJ	A Summary of Christian Teachings	Pope Pius XI
26		John of the Cross	Doctor mysticus (Mystical Doctor)	1542	1591	1926	Religious priest, Mystic, OCD (reformer)	Spiritual Canticle; Dark Night of the Soul; Ascent of Mount Carmel	Pope Pius XI
27		Robert Bellarmine		1542	1621	1931	Archbishop of Capua, Cardinal, Theologian, SJ	Disputationes de Controversiis	Pope Pius XI
28		Albertus Magnus	Doctor universalis (Universal Doctor)	1193	1280	1931	Bishop of Regensburg, Theologian, OP	On Cleaving to God; On Fate	Pope Pius XI
29		Anthony of Padua	Doctor evangelicus (Evangelical Doctor)	1195	1231	1946	Religious priest, OFM	Sermons for Feast Days	Pope Pius XII
30		Lawrence of Brindisi	Doctor apostolicus (Apostolic Doctor)	1559	1619	1959	Religious priest, OFMCap	Mariale	Pope John XXIII
31		Teresa of Ávila	Doctor orationis (Doctor of prayer)	1515	1582	1970	Discalced Carmelite (reformer)	La Vida de la Santa Madre Teresa de Jesús; The Way of Perfection; The Interior Castle	Pope Paul VI
32		Catherine of Siena		1347	1380	1970	Mystic, TOSD	The Dialogue of Divine Providence	Pope Paul VI
33		Thérèse of Lisieux	Doctor amoris (Doctor of love) Doctor synthesis (Doctor of synthesis)	1873	1897	1997	OCD	The Story of a Soul; Letters of Saint Therese	Pope John Paul II
34		John of Ávila		1500	1569	2012	Diocesan priest, Mystic	Audi, filia Spiritual Letters	Pope Benedict XVI
35		Hildegard of Bingen		1098	1179	2012	Abbess OSB, consecrated virgin, visionary, polymath, composer	Scivias; Liber vitae meritorum Liber divinorum operum Ordo virtutum	Pope Benedict XVI
36		Gregory of Narek		951	1003	2015	Monk, poet, mystic, theologian	Book of Lamentations	Pope Francis
37		Irenaeus of Lyon	Doctor unitatis (Doctor of Unity)	130	202	2022	Bishop, theologian, Martyr	Proof of the Apostolic Preaching; Against Heresies	Pope Francis
38		John Henry Newman		1801	1890	2025	Cardinal, theologian, Catholic convert, CO	Apologia Pro Vita Sua; Tract 90; An Essay on the Development of Christian Doctrine; Grammar of Assent	Pope Leo XIV

==== Proposed Doctors ====
In October 2018, on the occasion of the canonization of Oscar Romero, martyred Archbishop of San Salvador, José Luis Escobar Alas, the current Archbishop of San Salvador, petitioned Pope Francis to name Romero a Doctor of the Church.

In October 2019, the Polish Catholic Bishops Conference formally petitioned Pope Francis to consider making Pope John Paul II a Doctor of the Church in an official proclamation, in recognition of his contributions to theology, philosophy, and Catholic literature, as well as the formal documents of his papacy.

In January 2023, Cardinal Angelo Bagnasco proposed that Pope Benedict XVI be declared a doctor of the Church "as soon as possible", in view of his theological intelligence and contribution to the formation of current doctrine of the Catholic Church, such as the new catechism. In January 2024, Archbishop Georg Gänswein expressed his desire to one day see Benedict XVI canonized and proclaimed a Doctor of the Church.

In April 2024, during a private audience Pope Francis received a formal request from the superior general of the Discalced Carmelites, Miguel Márquez Calle, to declare Teresa Benedicta of the Cross a Doctor of the Church. The Discalced Carmelites first launched an international commission to gather the necessary documentation required for the declaration in 2022, in commemoration of the 100th anniversary of her conversion to Catholicism and the 80th anniversary of her martyrdom.

==== Other recognised Doctors ====
In addition, parts of the Catholic Church have recognised other individuals with this title. In Spain, Fulgentius of Cartagena, Ildephonsus of Toledo and Leander of Seville have been recognised with this title. In 2007 Pope Benedict XVI, in his encyclical Spe Salvi, called Maximus the Confessor "the great Greek Doctor of the Church", though the Dicastery for the Causes of Saints considers this declaration an informal one.

==== Scholastic epithets ====
Though not named Doctors of the Church or even canonized, many of the more celebrated doctors of theology and law of the Middle Ages were given an epithet which expressed the nature of their expertise. Among these are John Duns Scotus, Doctor subtilis ("subtle teacher"); Alexander of Hales, Doctor irrefragibilis ("unanswerable teacher"); Roger Bacon, Doctor mirabilis ("wondrous teacher"); William of Ockham, Doctor singularis et invincibilis ("unique and invincible teacher"); Jean Gerson, Doctor christianissimus ("most Christian teacher"); Ramon Llull, Doctor illuminatus ("enlightened teacher"); Nicholas of Cusa, Doctor Christianus ("Christian teacher"); Gregory of Rimini, Doctor authenticus ("reliable teacher"); John of Ruusbroec, Doctor divinus ecstaticus ("ecstatic divine teacher"); and Francisco Suárez, Doctor eximius ("exceptional teacher").

=== Syro-Malabar Catholic Church ===
The Syro-Malabar Catholic Church recognises Ambrose, Jerome, Gregory, Augustine, Athanasius, Basil, Gregory of Nazianzus and John Chrysostom, as well as Ephrem the Syrian, Isaac the Syrian of Nineveh, Isaac of Antioch, Jacob of Serugh, Pope Leo I, John of Damascus, Cyril of Alexandria, Cyril of Jerusalem, Epiphanius of Salamis and Gregory of Nyssa.

=== Chaldean Catholic Church ===
The Chaldean Catholic Church honours as doctor Polycarp, Eustathius of Antioch, Meletius, Alexander of Jerusalem, Athanasius, Basil, Cyril of Alexandria, Gregory Nazianzus, Gregory of Nyssa, John Chrysostom, Fravitta of Constantinople, Ephrem the Syrian, Jacob of Nisibis, Jacob of Serugh, Isaac of Armenia, Isaac of Nineveh, and Maruthas of Martyropolis.

== Eastern Orthodox Church ==
The Eastern Orthodox Church honors many of the pre-schism saints as well, but the term Doctor of the Church is not applied in the same way. One consistent use of the category is the trio of Basil the Great, Gregory of Nazianzus and John Chrysostom, recognised as universal teachers and known as the Three Holy Hierarchs. The church also recognises three saints with the title Theologos (Theologian): John the Evangelist, Gregory of Nazianzus and Symeon the New Theologian.

The Eastern Orthodox Church recognises also: Gregory of Nyssa, Symeon the New Theologian, Maximus the Confessor.

=== Russian Orthodox Church ===
The Russian Orthodox Church commemorates on 19 July the feast of Three Holy Russian Hierarchs: Demetrius of Rostov, Mitrophan of Voronezh and Tikhon of Zadonsk.

== Armenian Church ==
The Armenian Apostolic Church recognises the Twelve Holy Teachers (Vardapets) of the Church

- Hierotheus the Thesmothete
- Dionysius the Areopagite
- Pope Sylvester I
- Athanasius of Alexandria
- Cyril of Alexandria
- Ephrem the Syrian
- Basil the Great
- Gregory Nazianzus
- Gregory of Nyssa
- Epiphanius of Salamis
- John Chrysostom
- Cyril of Jerusalem.

They also recognise their own saints Mesrob, Yeghishe, Movses Khorenatsi, David the Invincible, Gregory of Narek, Nerses III the Builder, Nerses IV the Gracious, and Nerses of Lambron as "Doctors of the Armenian Church" or the "Armenian Doctors".

== Assyrian Church of the East ==
The Assyrian Church of the East recognises Yeghishe, Elishaʿ bar Quzbaye, Abraham the Great of Kashkar, Narsai, Diodorus of Tarsus, Theodore of Mopsuestia, and Nestorius as Doctors of the Church.

== Anglicanism ==
The churches of the Anglican Communion tend not to use the term Doctor of the Church in their calendars of saints, preferring expressions such as "Teacher of the Faith". Those thus recognised include figures from before and after the Reformation, most of whom are chosen among those already recognised as in the Catholic Church and Eastern Orthodox Church. Those designated as Teachers of the Faith in the Church of England's calendar of saints are as follows:

- Basil the Great
- Gregory of Nazianzus
- Hilary of Poitiers
- Francis de Sales
- Thomas Aquinas
- Cyril of Jerusalem
- Frederick Denison Maurice
- William of Ockham
- Anselm
- Catherine of Siena
- Athanasius
- Ephrem of Syria
- Sundar Singh of India
- Cyril of Alexandria
- Irenæus
- Bonaventure
- Gregory of Nyssa and his sister Macrina
- Brooke Foss Westcott
- Jeremy Taylor
- Bernard of Clairvaux
- Augustine of Hippo
- Gregory the Great
- John Chrysostom
- Sergius of Radonezh
- Jerome
- Teresa of Ávila
- Therese of Lisieux
- Richard Hooker
- William Temple
- Leo the Great
- John of Damascus
- Ambrose
- John of the Cross

Since all of the above appear in the calendar at the level of Lesser Festival or Commemoration, their celebration is optional. Similarly, because "In the Calendar of the Saints, diocesan and other local provision may be made to supplement the national Calendar", those Doctors of the Church recognised by the Catholic Church may also be celebrated in the Church of England.

== Lutheranism ==
The Lutheran calendar of saints generally does not use the term Doctor of the Church. Instead, it uses the term Confessor to commemorate individuals who made important theological contributions to the faith through their writing or teaching, as well as those who publicly defended and promoted the faith. The calendar of the Lutheran Church–Missouri Synod lists the following figures as Confessors:

- Basil the Great
- Gregory of Nazianzus
- Gregory of Nyssa
- Philipp Melanchthon
- Martin Luther
- Athanasius of Alexandria
- Cyril of Alexandria
- Robert Barnes
- Martin Chemnitz
- Jonathan Edwards
- Daniel Payne
- Dietrich Bonhoeffer

The LCMS calendar of saints also commemorates the following individuals as Theologians:

- Anselm of Canterbury
- C. F. W. Walther
- Bede the Venerable
- Johann Gerhard
- Bernard of Clairvaux
- Augustine of Hippo
- John of Damascus
- Leonhard Kaiser

== See also ==
- Fathers of the Church
