= Ana de Jesús =

Spanish Discalced Carmelite nun and writer

Blessed Ana de Jesus OCD
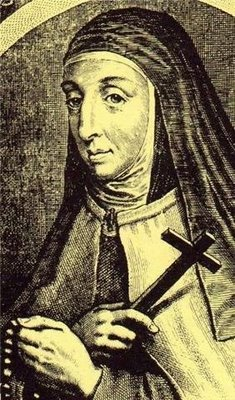
- Sister Ana de Jesus praying
- Born: 25 November 1545; Medina del Campo, Valladolid, Spain
- Died: 4 March 1621 (aged 75); Brussels, Belgium
- Venerated in: Roman Catholic Church
- Beatified: 29 September 2024, King Baudouin Stadium by Pope Francis
- Feast: 25 November

Ana de Jesús, known in English as Anne of Jesus (25 November 1545 – 4 March 1621), was a Spanish Discalced Carmelite nun and writer. She was the founder of the Carmelite reform and a close companion of Teresa of Ávila, and served to establish new monasteries of the Order throughout Europe. Known as a mystic and for her writings on prayer, she has been beatified by the Catholic Church.

== Childhood ==
Born Ana de Lobera y Torres in Medina del Campo in the Province of Valladolid, her parents were Diego de Lobera and Francisca Torres, who also had a son called Cristóbal, who became a Jesuit. As a small child she was assumed to be deaf and dumb. However, she started to talk at the age of seven. Her father died some months after her birth, and her mother died too when Ana was nine years old, so she was left an orphan and went to live with her father's relatives.

== Monastic life ==
Having made a vow of virginity, Lobera entered the Monastery of St. Joseph in Ávila, founded by Teresa of Ávila, in 1570. In 1571, while still a novice, she was sent to a new foundation in Salamanca, where she professed religious vows on 22 October, and she remained there until 1575. That year she accompanied Teresa for the foundation of the Monastery of Beas, Spain, of which she became the first prioress.

After being in a new monastery in Granada, Ana made a foundation at Madrid (1586), where she also served as a prioress. It was there that she became involved in a dispute which was to have long-term repercussions. The friar in charge of the monastery, Nicholas of Gesu Maria Doria, made changes requiring severe rigidity in the Constitutions of the nuns, drawn up by Teresa with the assistance of Jerome Gratian, and approved by a chapter in 1581. His intentions was, that by concentrating all authority in the hands of a committee of external officials, he could thereby guard the nuns against any relaxation of their life. Ann of Jesus, determined to preserve intact Teresa's work, with Doria's knowledge appealed to the Holy See for papal confirmation of their Constitutions. This was granted by Pope Sixtus V in a papal brief dated 5 June 1590. Then, however, Doria complained to King Philip II of Spain that the nuns had gone over the head of their superiors, as a result of which the king twice forbade the meeting of a monastery chapter to receive the papal brief, and the nuns, and their advisers and supporters, the friars Luis de León and Domingo Bañez, fell into disgrace. Furthermore, for over a year no friar was allowed to hear the nuns' confessions. When the king finally heard the story from the nuns' point of view, he ordered that the internal council of the monastery resume its authority, and he further petitioned the Holy See for an approval of the Constitutions. This was granted by Pope Gregory XIV on 25 April 1591, revoking the decrees of his predecessors.

Doria resumed his authority over the nuns, but his first act was to punish Ana de Jesús severely for having made the appeal to the Holy See. She was forbidden from receiving Holy Communion for three years, and separated from all interaction with the other nuns of the monastery. When the period for this penance was over, she was sent to Salamanca, where she became prioress from 1596 to 1599.

In the meanwhile, a project had developed for bringing the Teresian Reform to France. Mother Marie of the Incarnation, the first French woman in the Order, warned by Teresa and assisted by Francis de Sales, the Abbé de Brétigny and Cardinal de Bérulle, brought a few nuns, mostly trained by Teresa herself, with Ana de Jesús at their head, from Avila to Paris, where they established the Monastery of the Incarnation, 16 October 1604.

Ana was a friend of John of the Cross, who dedicated his work the Spiritual Canticle to her. Saint John of the Cross even entrusted the book to her which she conserved until 1586 when she gave it to the novice Isabel of the Incarnation, who took it to the foundations in Baeza and Jaén, where it was bound and is preserved. When Ana saw Saint John of the Cross for the first time, he was all battered and hurt, she sent two nuns to sing Liras en Loor de los trabajos to him, when he heard just the first verse, they had such an impact on him he fell into ecstasy. There are many authors who attribute these Liras to Ana, but today there is doubt about her authorship.

== Relationship with Teresa of Ávila ==
From the moment Teresa of Ávila met Ana de Jesus she became her favorite daughter, and, along with Mary of St. Joseph, were her pillars in her life and work.

Ana and Saint Teresa were so close, that when Saint Teresa was writing her book The Book of the Foundations, in Salamanca, she was sharing a cell with Ana who was aware of everything the saint was writing. She was the person that was most familiar with this book.

It was Ana who collected all the literary works of Teresa after her death, and in 1587 gave them to the friar Luis de León for publication, being finally published under the name of Los libros de la madre Teresa de Jesús, fundadora de los monasterios de monjas y frailes de Carmelitas Descalzos de la primera Regla ("The books of the Mother Teresa of Jesus, founder of the monasteries of nuns and friars of Discalced Carmelites of the first Rule"), Salamanca, 1588.

== Europe ==
In 1604 Ana moved with other nuns to Paris, where they established the Monastery of the Incarnation. Because of the success of the Order in France, she decided to make a further foundation at Pontoise (15 January 1605), and another one at Dijon (21 September 1605).

At a time when she was struggling with the authorities of the Catholic Church in France, who wished to make many exceptions in their way of life, Ana de Jesús was called to Brussels by the Infanta Isabella and Archduke Albert in order to found a new monastery of the Discalced Carmelite nuns there. Besides this one, she made foundations at Louvain, Mons and gave help with the ones in Antwerp and Kraków, Poland. Ana remained as a prioress in Brussels until her death in 1621.

== Beatification process ==
The same year that Ana died, (1621), an ordinary beatification and canonization process started in the locations of Mechelen, Tournai, Cambrai, Arras and Antwerp. The declarations continued, one after another until 1642. Still, the process did not move forward.

In 1872, the beatification process resumed. Father Bertelo Ignacio, a Belgian Carmelite, put together in Brussels a new helpful guide with documents of the beatification process of M. Ana, which he called Tableau Chronologique des principaux témoignages ... de la vénérable mére Anne de Jésus.

On 2 May 1878, her cause was formally opened, and she was declared a Servant of God. In 1881, the diocese of Mechelen opened the process on the fame of sanctity, life, miracles, and new apostolic decrees were written about her works and the validity of the apostolic process. Her writings were approved on 2 May 1885. In 1895, in Mechelen, another process was opened about her virtues and miracles in specie. In 1904, another decree about the validity of the apostolic process was written, without yet declaring her heroic virtue.

She was declared venerable 28 November 2019. The Holy See Press office stated that Pope Francis authorized the Congregation to promulgate the Decrees regarding "the heroic virtues of the Servant of God Ana de Jesús de Lobera (née Ana), professed nun of the Order of Discalced Carmelites; born on 25 November 1545 in Medina del Campo, Spain, and died on 4 March 1621 in Brussels, Belgium". On 14 December 2023, Pope Francis recognized the miracle necessary for Ana's beatification. She was beatified on 29 September 2024 at the King Baudouin Stadium in Brussels.

== Apparition to St. Therese ==
Even though she was declared venerable in 2019, the Carmelites have always called her "Venerable Mother Anne". Therese of Lisieux refers to her as "Venerable Anne of Jesus". In Saint Therese's Story of a Soul she writes of a dream she has in which Venerable Anne of Jesus appears to her and lets her know that she will soon be able to go to heaven. Therese says: "Without the least hesitation, I recognized Venerable Anne of Jesus, foundress of the Carmel in France. Her face was beautiful but with an immaterial beauty." She later continues on to ask her if she will be able to go to heaven soon and Ana responds saying "Yes, soon, soon I promise you".

== Literary work ==
When she left for Europe, Fr. Jerome Gratian encouraged Ana de Jesus to write. She wrote about the foundation of the Carmelite convent in Granada and about her trip to Paris. The poems of Ana de Jesús do not have as much relevance as her statements, writings, records and correspondence. There are barely any autographed writings, if not copies. Some of her writings have disappeared. She states in her writings that she has a religious mission: to propagate Teresian reform out of Spain, and she must do so by God's will. So, she will travel outside of the convent... always following the divine mandate. Her letters demonstrate a woman who knows how to attend to the material needs necessary to expand the order. This is the reason why she leaves the convent and dedicates the rest of her life to this work.

She has left behind a great amount of letters and documents but the letters written to her by Mother Teresa of Avila were burnt, by her, after being instructed to do so by Teresa herself, in those years they had problems with the Calced Carmelites. Ana remembers this with pain in 1597.

There are 53 conserved letters, from 1590 to 1621. They encompass all of her religious life, from her becoming a prioress to a few days before her death. They are of great historical value because they reference many diverse people during that time. These letters contain different content depending on who they were sent to; like those sent to Fr. Diego of Gueverra from those sent to Sor Beatriz of the Conception. The first of these letters talk about the monastic foundations, spiritual advice, problems with the edition of his book Libro de Job or the translation to flamenco of Saint Teresa's writings; the second of these letters has a more intimate and personal tone, she writes her emotions, her suffering in the distance that separates them or about her health problems.
