= Crossing the Threshold of Hope =

1994 book by Pope John Paul II

- Author: John Paul II
- Language: Originally Italian, translated into 53 others
- Publisher: Alfred A. Knopf
- Publication date: 1994
- Publication place: Vatican City
- Media type: Paperback and Hardcover
- Pages: 229
- ISBN: 0-679-76561-1

Crossing the Threshold of Hope was written in 1994 by Pope John Paul II. It was published originally in Italian by Arnoldo Mondadori Editore and in English by Alfred A. Knopf, Inc. It is distributed by Random House, Inc., New York City. By 1998, the book had sold several million copies and was published in forty languages. Over one million copies were sold in Italy alone.

== Origin ==
The contents presented in Crossing the Threshold of Hope were originally intended to be broadcast as a live television interview with Vittorio Messori, an Italian journalist and writer. The interview was to celebrate fifteen years of his papacy. When John Paul II had to cancel the interview at the last minute, he still wanted to answer Messori's questions and told him: “You have asked me questions, therefore you have a right to responses. ... I am working on them. I will let you have them. Then do with them what you think is appropriate”.

At the end of April 1994, Messori received a package from the Vatican: The pope had answered every question. John Paul II expressed his confidence in Messori by permitting him to do whatever he saw fit with the contents of the folder. He only wrote “Crossing the Threshold of Hope” on the inside front cover of the folder as a suggestion for a possible title.

As Messori began compiling the questions, he saw that additional questions as follow-up would be helpful. Additional questions were composed and sent. When the follow-up questions returned from the Vatican, Messori found that the pope had again answered every question.

== Contents ==
The text of the book is presented exactly as written by John Paul II. Points that the pope underlined in his original manuscript are italicized in the published text. Paragraph breaks remain consistent with John Paul II's writing.

Messori doesn't ask private questions, but the questions he does ask allow the reader to see the personal life of the pope. For example, the very first question in Crossing the Threshold of Hope asks whether the pope ever doubts his relationship with God, especially given the importance of his role in the Catholic Church. The pope's answer grounds itself in Scripture: “Be not afraid!” (Luke 1:30). These words echoed through John Paul II's papacy, and they continue to echo in this writing.

Messori continues to ask questions throughout the book that people throughout the world have wondered: “How do you pray?” “Does God really exist?” “Is there really hope in the young?” “Does eternal life exist?” “What does it mean to be saved?” The pope does not answer questions that only pertain to Catholicism. Messori asks questions about Islam, Buddhism, Judaism, Hinduism, and monotheistic religions in general. John Paul II's answers to these questions reflect his great love for all people and his knowledge of these religions: he speaks several times of individuals he has met who belong to these religions, sometimes calling them by name. He also says vehemently that “the Catholic Church rejects nothing that is true and holy in these religions”. He quotes the Second Vatican Council as mentioning a "common soteriological root present in all religions" though he seems to contradict that by stating that "the Buddhist tradition and the methods deriving from it have an almost exclusively negative soteriology." and continuing "doctrines of salvation in Buddhism and Christianity are opposed." This has been judged by Buddhists as a misunderstanding of Buddhism.

Messori's questions in the latter portion of the book refer to various tenets of the Catholic faith, including whether the Catholic Church really has the fullness of truth, and whether or not heaven exists. Many people ask these questions, and the pope's answers to these questions can be found here.

Some readers may find Messori frustrating at times, as his writing can be gushing and formal. He says things like, “Pardon me, Your Holiness, but my role (which gives me great honor but also a certain responsibility) is also that of a respectful “provocateur” with regard to questions...”.

Topics of the book include: “The Pope: A Scandal and a Mystery,” “How does the Pope Pray?” “Does God Really Exist?” “Proof: Is it Still Valid?” “If God Exists, Why is He Hiding?” “Is Jesus the Son of God?” “Why Is There So Much Evil in the World?” “What Does To Save Mean?” “Why So Many Religions?” “Buddha?” “Muhammad?” “Judaism?” “What Is the New Evangelization?” “Is There Really Hope in the Young?” “Was God at Work in the Fall of Communism?” “Is Only Rome Right?” “In Search of Lost Unity,” “A Qualitative Renewal,” “The Reaction of the World,” “Does Eternal Life Exist?” “Human Rights,” “The Mother of God,” and “Be Not Afraid.”

The pope answers questions directly, and he also provides a context and history as background. He reflects on Descartes’ philosophy of “I think, therefore I am,” while referencing Kant, Hegel, Husserl, Heidegger, Aristotle, and Plato when defining the history of European thought.

Although the pope writes to a worldwide audience, he also speaks specifically of the Catholic faith, including references not only to the Sacred Scriptures, but also many saints: Augustine's City of God, John of the Cross and his Ascent of Mount Carmel, Thomas Aquinas and the Summa Theologica, and many more.

== Reception ==
Reception of this work of John Paul II range from “With the humility and generosity of spirit for which he is well known, John Paul speaks forthrightly to all people” to “the Pope emerges as the master of the flat statement, the bland certainty. Metaphor, anecdotes, humour, imagination rarely trouble his style; he prefers the long pedantic plod through Aristotle and Plato, St Paul, Augustine, St Thomas Aquinas, Descartes, Pascal, Kant, Hegel, Husserl and Heidegger”.

The Pope's negative portrayal of Buddhism received widespread criticism within the various branches of Buddhism across the world.

In response to receiving several letters from Poland, from individuals and from a publishing house, asking him to comment on it, Thinley Norbu Rinpoche (one of the key teachers in the Nyingma lineage of Tibetan Buddhism) wrote the book Welcoming Flowers from across the Cleansed Threshold of Hope: An Answer to the Pope's Criticism of Buddhism to address the "serious, gratuitous misrepresentations of Buddhist doctrine which seemed to be based on misunderstandings" contained within Crossing the Threshold of Hope.

The release of the book in Sri Lanka on the eve of the Pope's January visit to this country stirred up waves of indignation in the Buddhist community that spread as far as the Vatican. The Buddhist prelates announced that they would not attend an inter-religious meeting requested by the Pope unless he formally retracted his unfavorable remarks about Buddhism. Although on arrival the Pope tried to appease the feelings of Buddhist leaders by declaring his esteem for their religion, even quoting the Dhammapada, he fell short of proffering a full apology, and this did not satisfy the Sangha elders.

The New York Times cited criticism from Sri Lanka Buddhists, saying:

In his book, the Pope uses language that Buddhists here say they found offensive, notably its reference to nirvana as a state of "indifference with regard to the world" and its assertion that the Buddhist doctrine of salvation through nirvana is "almost exclusively negative."

Ven. Bhikkhu Bodhi, a highly regarded scholar of Theravada Buddhism and past president of the Buddhist Publication Society published an essay "intended as a short corrective to the Pope's demeaning characterization of Buddhism" entitled Toward a Threshold of Understanding.

The English satirical magazine Private Eye attacked the book; "A few pages reveal however, that this is no interview at all, being constructed instead on the age-old Catholic model of the Catechism, in which the grovelling postulant is not only given all the answers to memorise but has all the questions dictated to him too."

== Citations ==
Crossing the Threshold of Hope has been cited by many, including Scott Hahn (Lord, Have Mercy: The Healing Power of Confession), Eugene Mario DeRobertis (Phenomenological Psychology: A Text for Beginners), Harold C Raley (A Watch Over Mortality: The Philosophical Story of Julian Marias), R Baschetti (Evolutionary, Biological Origins of Mortality: Implications for Research with Human Embryonic Stem Cells), Anthony Scioli (Hope in the Age of Anxiety), John Berkman (The Consumption of Animals and the Catholic Tradition), and Christopher Jamison (Finding Sanctuary: Monastic Steps for Everyday Life) and more.

== See also ==
- Criticism of Buddhism
