= Gracián =

Gracián is a Spanish surname. Notable people with the surname include:

- Baltasar Gracián (1601–1658), Spanish writer and philosopher
- Jerónimo Gracián (1545-1614), Spanish Carmelite and writer
- Leandro Gracián (born 1982), Argentine footballer
