= Fontiveros =

- Municipality and Town
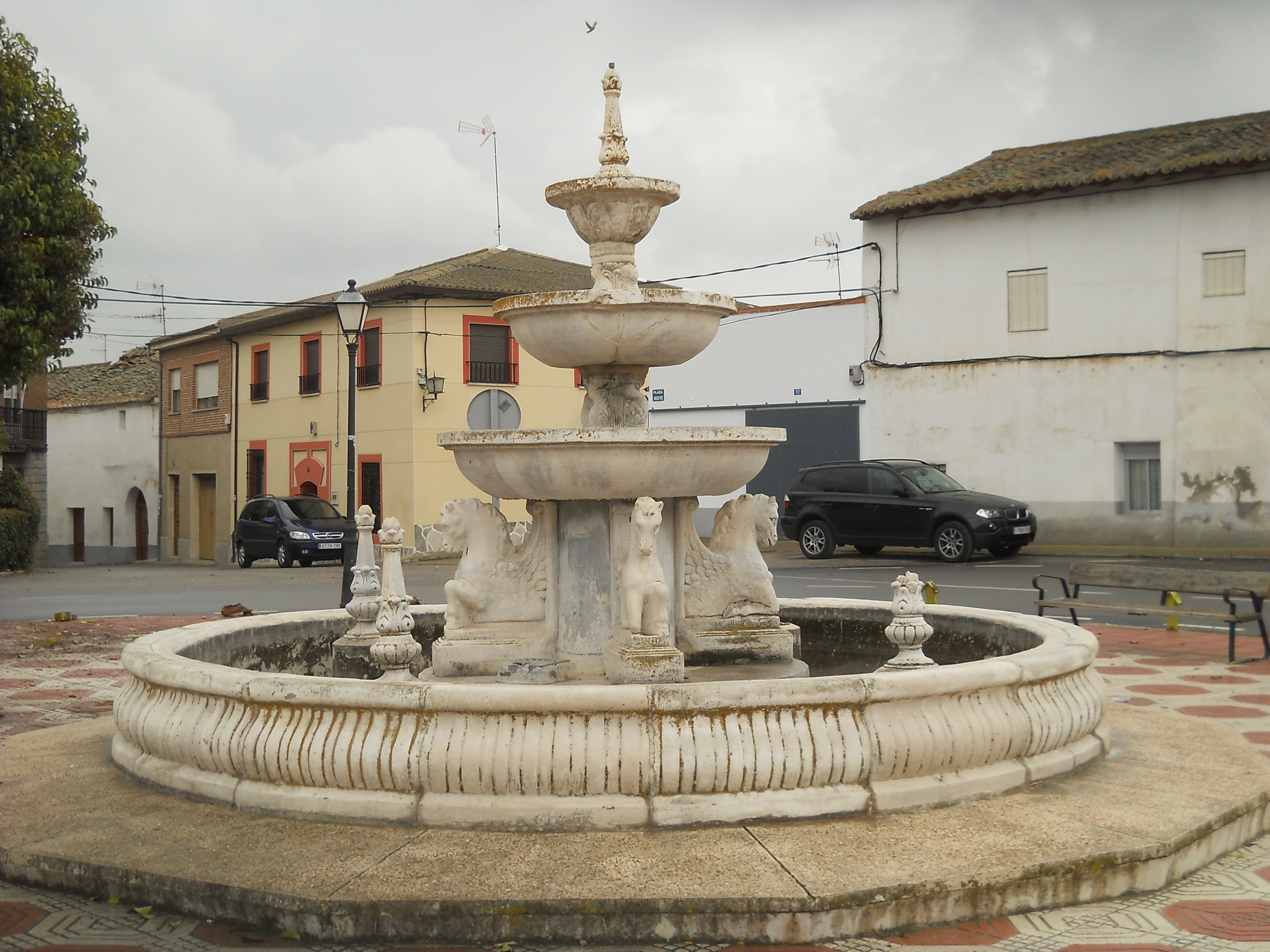

- Coat of arms

- Location in Spain. Fontiveros (Spain)
- Coordinates: 40°55′46″N 4°57′53″W
- Country: Spain
- Autonomous community: Castile and León
- Province: Ávila
- Comarca: La Moraña
- Municipality: Fontiveros

Government
  - Alcalde (Mayor): Luciano Arroyo Martín (PSOE)

Area
  - Total: 36.42 km^{2} (14.06 sq mi)
- Elevation: 888 m (2,913 ft)

Population (2025-01-01)
  - Total: 715
  - Density: 19.6/km^{2} (50.8/sq mi)
- Time zone: UTC+1 (CET)
  - Summer (DST): UTC+2 (CEST)
- Website: Official website

Fontiveros is a municipality in Spain in the Ávila province, in the autonomous community of Castile and León. It comprises an area of approximately 2 square kilometers and according to the 2011 census (INE), the municipality has a population of 173 inhabitants.

It is famous for being the birthplace of Saint John of the Cross.

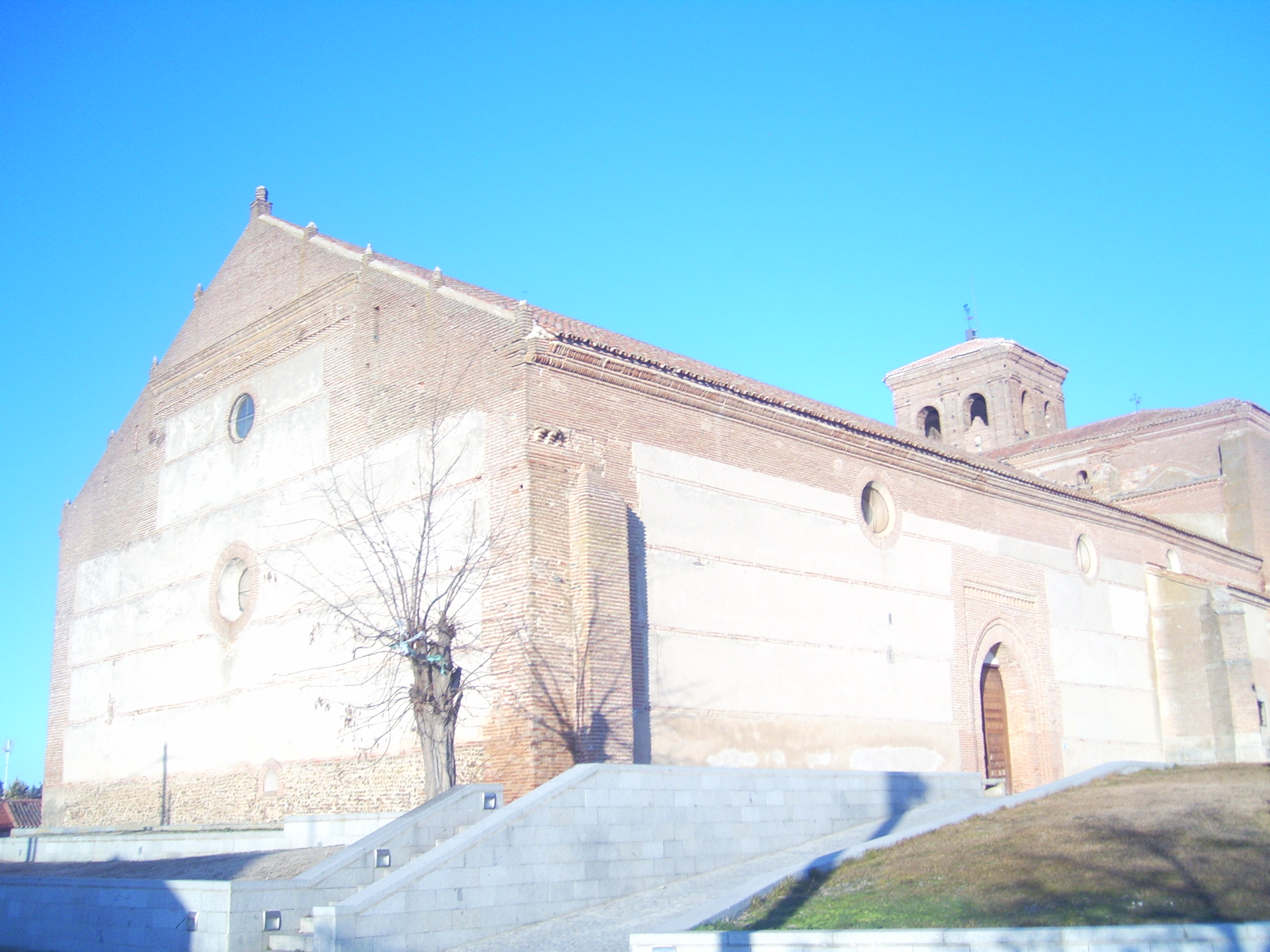
Iglesia de San Cipriano

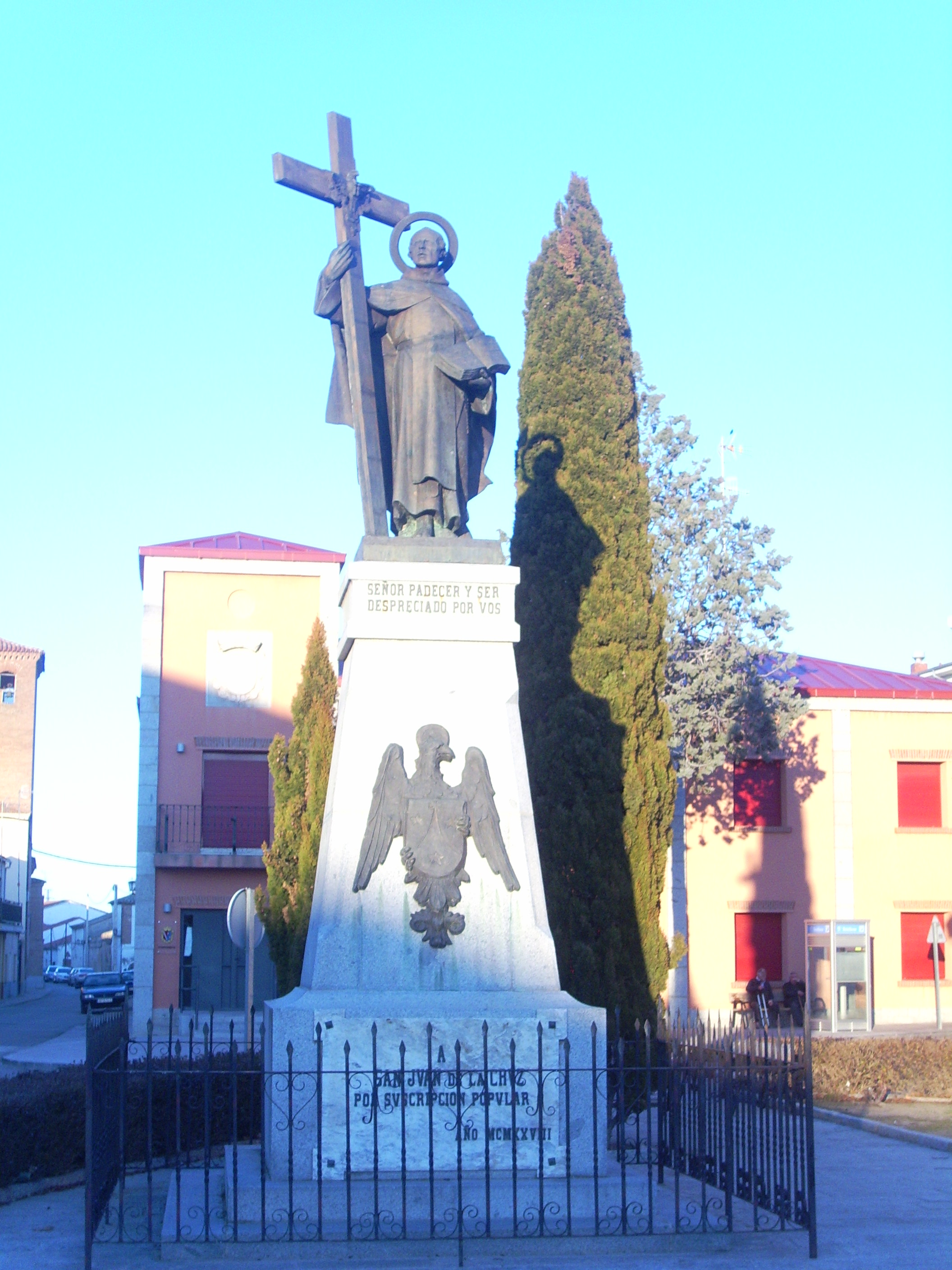
Monumento a San Juan de la Cruz

== Population ==
Historical population
Year	Pop.	±% p.a.
2023	716	—
2024	725	+1.26%
2025	715	−1.38%
Source: INE
