= Dark Night of the Soul =

Poem written by John of the Cross

The Dark Night of the Soul (Spanish: La noche oscura del alma) is a phase of passive purification in the mystical development of the individual's spirit, according to the 16th-century Spanish mystic and Catholic poet St. John of the Cross. John describes the concept in his treatise Dark Night (Noche Oscura), a commentary on his poem with the same name. It follows after the second phase, the illumination in which God's presence is felt, but this presence is not yet stable. The author himself did not give any title to his poem, which together with this commentary and the Ascent of Mount Carmel (Subida del Monte Carmelo) forms a treatise on the active and passive purification of the senses and the spirit, leading to mystical union.

In modern times, the phrase "dark night of the soul" has become a popular phrase to describe a crisis of faith or a difficult, painful period in one's life.

== The poem ==
=== Dating and subject ===
The poem of St. John of the Cross, in eight stanzas of five lines each, narrates the journey of the soul to the mystical union with God. The time or place of composition are not certain. It is likely that the poem was written between 1577 and 1579. It has been proposed that the poem was composed while John was imprisoned in Toledo, although the few explicit statements in this regard are unconvincing and second-hand.

The journey is called "dark night" in part because darkness represents the fact that the destination "God" is unknowable, as in the 14th-century mystical classic The Cloud of Unknowing; both pieces are derived from the works of Pseudo-Dionysius the Areopagite in the 6th century. Further, the path per se is unknowable. The "dark night" does not refer to the difficulties of life in general, although the phrase has been taken to refer to such trials.

=== Text ===
La noche oscura del alma

En una noche oscura
Con ansias en amores inflamada,
¡Oh dichosa ventura!
Sali sin ser notada,
Estando ya mi casa sosegada.

A oscuras, y segura
Por la secreta escala disfrazada,
¡Oh dichosa ventura!
A oscuras y encelada
Estando ya mi casa sosegada.

En la noche dichosa
En secreto, que nadie me veia,
Ni yo miraba cosa,
Sin otra luz, y guia,
Sino la que en el corazón ardia.

Aquesta me guiaba
Más cierto que la luz del mediodia,
A donde me esperaba,
Quien yo bien me sabia,
En parte, donde nadie parecia.

¡Oh noche que guiaste,
Oh noche amable más que el alborada;
Oh noche que juntaste
Amado con amada,
Amada en el Amado transformada!

En mi pecho florido,
Que entero para él sólo se guardaba,
Allí quedó dormido,
Y yo le regalaba,
Y el ventalle de cedros aire daba.

El aire de la almena,
Cuando yo sus cabellos esparcia,
Con su mano serena
En mi cuello heria,
Y todos mis sentidos suspendia.

Quedéme, y olvidéme,
El rostro recliné sobre el Amado,
Cesó todo, y dejéme,
Dejando mi cuidado
Entre las azucenas olvidado.

Translation:

Dark Night of the Soul

On a dark night,
Kindled in love with yearnings
—oh, happy chance!—
I went forth without being observed,
My house being now at rest.

In darkness and secure,
By the secret ladder, disguised
—oh, happy chance!—
In darkness and in concealment,
My house being now at rest.

In the happy night,
In secret, when none saw me,
Nor I beheld aught,
Without light or guide,
save that which burned in my heart.

This light guided me
More surely than the light of noonday
To the place where he (well I knew who!)
was awaiting me—
A place where none appeared.

Oh, night that guided me,
Oh, night more lovely than the dawn,
Oh, night that joined
Beloved with lover,
Lover transformed in the Beloved!

Upon my flowery breast,
Kept wholly for himself alone,
There he stayed sleeping,
and I caressed him,
And the fanning of the cedars made a breeze.

The breeze blew from the turret
As I parted his locks;
With his gentle hand
he wounded my neck
And caused all my senses to be suspended.

I remained, lost in oblivion;
My face I reclined on the Beloved.
All ceased and I abandoned myself,
Leaving my cares
forgotten among the lilies.

== Commentaries by John of the Cross ==
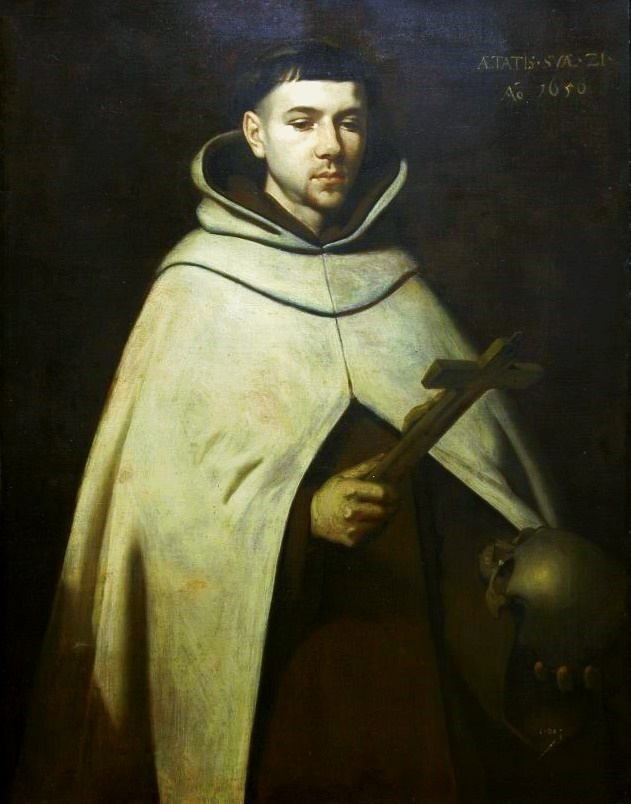
John of the Cross

The treatises Ascent of Mount Carmel (1581–1585) and Dark Night (the Declaración, 1584–1586) are commentaries on the poem, explaining its meaning line by line. Both works were left uncompleted.

The Ascent of Mount Carmel is divided into three books that reflect the two phases of the dark night. The first is a purification of the senses (titled "The Active Night of the Senses"). The second and third books describe the more intense purification of the spirit (titled "The Active Night of the Spirit"). The active purgation of the senses comprises the first of the classical three stages of the mystical journey, followed by those of illumination and then union. The passive purgation of the spirit takes place between illumination and full union, when the presence of God has already been felt but is not stable.

At the beginning of the commentary Dark Night, John wrote: "In this first verse, the soul tells the mode and manner in which it departs, as to its affection, from itself and from all things, dying through a true mortification to all of them and to itself, to arrive at a sweet and delicious life with God."

The dark night of the soul is a stage of final and complete purification, and is marked by confusion, helplessness, stagnation of the will, and a sense of the withdrawal of God's presence. (Note: In Mysticism, part II, chapter 9, Underhill quotes John: "This," says St. John of the Cross again, "is one of the most bitter sufferings of this purgation. The soul is conscious of a profound emptiness in itself, a cruel destitution of the three kinds of goods, natural, temporal, and spiritual, which are ordained for its comfort. It sees itself in the midst of the opposite evils, miserable imperfections, dryness and emptiness of the understanding, and abandonment of the spirit in darkness." The quote comes from Dark Night book 2 chapter 6:4. (Chong-Beng Gan 2015, p. 189)) It is the period of final "unselfing" and the surrender to the hidden purposes of the divine will. The final stage is union with the object of love, the one Reality, God. Here the self has been permanently established on a transcendental level and liberated for a new purpose.

== Contemporary understanding ==
The term "dark night of the soul" can be used as a synonym for a crisis of faith. More generally, it is "used informally to describe an extremely difficult and painful period in one's life". (Note: Ronald W. Pies: The phrase "dark night of the soul" is often used informally to describe an extremely difficult and painful period in one's life, for example, after the death of a loved one; the break-up of a marriage; or the diagnosis of a life-threatening illness. For many, the loneliness, isolation and fear associated with the COVID-19 pandemic is, indeed, a dark night of the soul. There is nothing wrong with these informal usages, and they have obvious links to the concepts of demoralization and despair, as we have defined them. But they differ significantly from the original meaning and context of the phrase, as first conceived by the Spanish mystic John of the Cross (1541–1597 AD). See, for example, Culadasa PhD, John Yates. (2017). The Mind Illuminated : a Complete Meditation Guide Integrating Buddhist Wisdom and Brain Science for Greater Mindfulness. Immergut PhD, Matthew. London: Hay House Publishing. ISBN 978-1-78180-879-5. OCLC 971364730.)

This crisis may endure for a long time. The "dark night" of St. Paul of the Cross in the 18th century endured 45 years, from which he ultimately recovered. The dark night of Mother Teresa, whose own name in religion she selected in honor of Thérèse of Lisieux, "may be the most extensive such case on record", having endured from 1948 almost until her death in 1997, with only brief interludes of relief, according to her letters.

Other authors have made similar references:

Inayat Khan states, "There can be no rebirth without a dark night of the soul, a total annihilation of all that you believed in and thought that you were." Joseph Campbell states "The dark night of the soul comes just before revelation. When everything is lost, and all seems darkness, then comes the new life and all that is needed."

Roberto Assagioli states:

Before the full and final victory, however, the soul has to undergo another test: it must pass through the "dark night" which is a new and deeper experience of annihilation, or a crucible in which all the human elements that go to make it up are melted together. But the darkest nights are followed by the most radiant dawns and the soul, perfect at last, enters into complete, constant and inseparable communion with the Spirit, so that – to use the bold statement employed by St John of the Cross – "it seems to be God himself and has the same characteristics as him".

Other writers have connected the Dark Night of the Soul to the work of Stanislav Grof.

== See also ==
- Divinization (Christian)
- Ego death
- Existential crisis
- Loevinger; Loevinger's stages of ego development
- Dąbrowski; Theory of positive disintegration
- Kenosis
- Lawrence Kohlberg; Kohlberg's stages of moral development
- Nigredo
- Psychology of religion

== Sources ==
- Chong-Beng Gan, Peter (2015). Dialectics and the Sublime in Underhill's Mysticism. Springer.
- Greene, Dana (Spring 1987). "Adhering to God: The Message of Evelyn Underhill for Our Times". Spirituality Today. Vol. 39. pp. 22–38.
- Schneiders, Sandra M. (2005). "John of the Cross". In Jones, Lindsay (ed.). MacMillan Encyclopedia of religion. MacMillan.
- Underhill, Evelyn (1999). Mysticism. Oneworld Publications. ISBN 1-85168-196-5.
