= Cosmas Vestitor =

Byzantine homiletic

Cosmas Vestitor (his nickname vestitor means "imperial wardrobe officer") was a Byzantine homiletic. He lived between 730 and 850 and left five sermons on the translation of the relics of St. John Chrysostom, with a brief Vita, and three encomia for Zechariah, one for St. Barbara, St. Joachim and St. Anna.
