= Ascent of Mount Carmel =

16th-century spiritual treatise by Spanish mystic Saint John of the Cross

Ascent of Mount Carmel (Spanish: Subida del Monte Carmelo) is a 16th-century spiritual treatise by Spanish Catholic mystic and poet Saint John of the Cross. The book is a systematic treatment of the ascetical life in pursuit of mystical union with Christ, giving advice and reporting on his own experience. Alongside another connected work by John, The Dark Night, it details the so-called Dark Night of the Soul, when the individual Soul undergoes earthly and spiritual privations in search of union with God. These two works, together with John's The Living Flame of Love and the Spiritual Canticle, are regarded as some of the greatest works both in Christian mysticism and in the Spanish language.

Written between 1578 and 1579 in Granada, Spain, after his escape from prison, the Ascent is illustrated by a diagram of the process outlined in the text of the Soul's progress to the summit of the metaphorical Mount Carmel where God is encountered. The work is divided into three sections and is set out as a commentary on four poetic stanzas by John on the subject of the Dark Night. John shows how the Soul sets out to leave all worldly ties and appetites behind to achieve "nothing less than transformation in God".

== Text of Dark Night of the Soul ==
Considered to be his introductory work on mystical theology, this work begins with an allegorical poem, Dark Night of the Soul. The rest of the text begins as a detailed explanation and interpretation of the poem, but after explaining the first five lines, John thereafter ignores the poem and writes a straightforward treatise on the two "active nights" of the soul.

The poem is as follows:

Translated text

In a dark night
With longings kindled in love
oh blessed chance
I went forth without being observed
My house already being at rest

Through darkness and secure
By the secret ladder disguised
oh blessed chance
Through darkness and in concealment
My house already being at rest

In the blessed night
In secret that none saw me
Nor I beheld aught
Without any other light or guide
Save that which was burning in the heart

That which guided me
More sure than the light of noonday
Where he was awaiting me
Him whom I knew well
In a place where no one appeared

Oh thou night that guided
Oh lovely night moreso than the dawn
Oh thou night that joined
Lover with beloved
Beloved in the lover transformed

Upon my flowery breast
Which I kept whole for himself alone
There he stayed sleeping
and I was caressing him,
And the fanning of the cedars made a breeze

The breeze from the turret
While I was parting his locks
With his gentle hand
He was wounding my neck
And causing all my senses to be suspended

I remained myself and forgot myself
My face reclined on the lover
All ceased and I abandoned myself
Leaving my concern
forgotten among the lilies.

Original Spanish text

En una noche oscura
con ansias en amores inflamada,
¡oh dichosa ventura!,
salí sin ser notada
estando ya mi casa sosegada

A oscuras y segura
por la secreta escala, disfrazada,
¡oh dichosa ventura!,
a oscuras y en celada,
estando ya mi casa sosegada.

En la noche dichosa,
en secreto que nadie me veía
ni yo miraba cosa
sin otra luz y guía
sino la que en el corazón ardía.

Aquesta me guiaba
más cierto que la luz de mediodía
adonde me esperaba
quien yo bien me sabía
en parte donde nadie parecía.

¡Oh noche, que guiaste!
¡Oh noche amable más que la alborada!
¡Oh noche que juntaste
amado con amada,
amada en el amado transformada!

En mi pecho florido,
que entero para él solo se guardaba
allí quedó dormido
y yo le regalaba
y el ventalle de cedros aire daba.

El aire de la almena
cuando yo sus cabellos esparcía
con su mano serena
en mi cuello hería
y todos mis sentidos suspendía.

Quedéme y olvidéme;
el rostro recliné sobre el amado;
cesó todo, y dejéme
dejando mi cuidado
entre las azucenas olvidado.

== Influence ==
John's spiritual method of inner purgation along the 'negative way' was an enormous influence on T. S. Eliot when he came to write the Four Quartets. John's poem contains these famous lines of self-abnegation leading to spiritual rebirth:

To reach satisfaction in all
desire its possession in nothing.
To come to possession in all
desire the possession of nothing.
To arrive at being all
desire to be nothing.
To come to the knowledge of all
desire the knowledge of nothing.
To come to the pleasure you have not
you must go by the way in which you enjoy not.
To come to the knowledge you have not
you must go by the way in which you know not.
To come to the possession you have not
you must go by the way in which you possess not.
To come by the what you are not
you must go by a way in which you are not.
When you turn toward something
you cease to cast yourself upon the all.
For to go from all to the all
you must deny yourself of all in all.
And when you come to the possession of the all
you must possess it without wanting anything.
Because if you desire to have something in all
your treasure in God is not purely your all.

Ascent of Mount Carmel became one of inspiration sources for Alejandro Jodorowsky's 1973 film The Holy Mountain, along with Mount Analogue by René Daumal.
