= Jerome Gratian =

Spanish Discalced Carmelite and writer

Jerome Gratian OCD
- Jerónimo Gracián
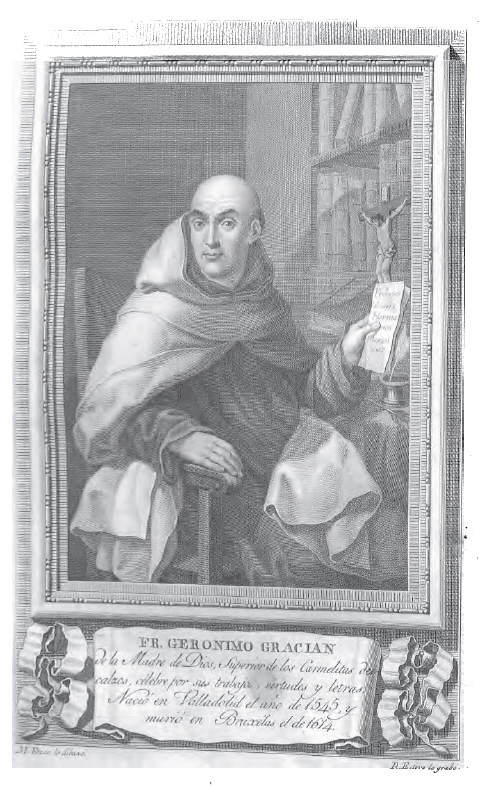
- Born: Jerónimo Gracián Dantisco; June 6, 1545; Valladolid, Kingdom of Castile, Crown of Castile
- Died: September 21, 1614 (aged 69); Brussels, Spanish Netherlands
- Other name: Jerónimo de la Madre de Dios

Jerónimo Gracián or Jerome Gratian, OCD (6 June 1545 – 21 September 1614) was a Spanish Discalced Carmelite and writer. He was the spiritual director of St Teresa of Ávila, who took a vow of obedience to him. He was the first Provincial of the Discalced Carmelites.

== Biography ==
Son of Diego Gracián de Alderete, brother of Lucas Gracián Dantisco, and grandson of the Polish humanist and Erasmian Juan Dantisco (Jan Dantyszek), he studied at the Jesuit college in Madrid and then went to the University of Alcalá to study theology and philosophy. He was ordained a priest in 1569.

He was a disciple of Saint Teresa of Jesus. As provincial of the reform, he supported a missionary Discalced Carmelite order for men, encouraging the apostolic work of the friars. However, in conflict with Father Nicholas Doria, who represented the observant movement desired by Philip II, shortly after the death of Saint John of the Cross, he was expelled from the Order. In 1593, he was captured by Barbary corsairs while sailing from Messina to Rome. He was held captive in Ottoman Tunisia for 2 years until ransomed. His captors firebranded him with a cross on the sole of one foot to punish his evangelizing.

Gracián was rehabilitated by Pope Clement VIII in a brief which would have restored him to the Order, had the Discalced Carmelite superiors in Spain been willing to receive him. He was instead admitted by the Carmelites at San Martino ai Monti. He was officially rehabilitated by the Discalced Carmelite Order in 1991.
