= Spiritual Canticle =

Work by Saint John of the Cross

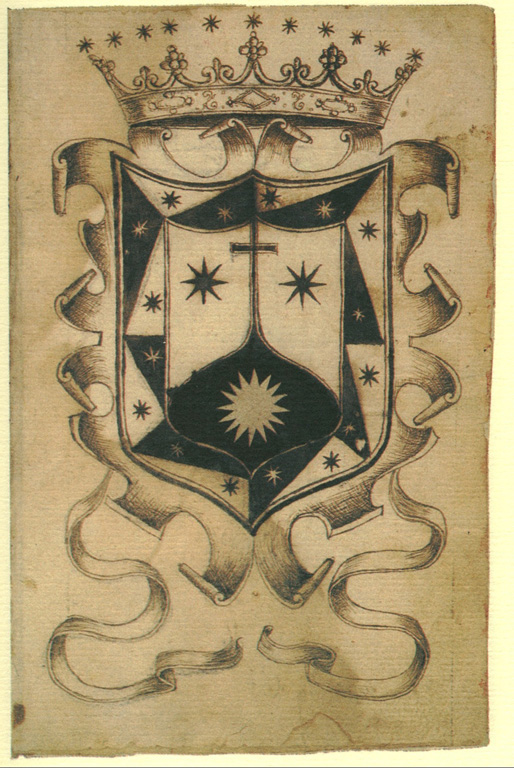
Arms of the Discalced Carmelites (distinguished by the Cross) drawn on a page of the "Manuscript of Sanlúcar". The manuscript retains the handwritten annotations of John of the Cross, and is preserved in the Discalced Carmelites convent in Sanlúcar de Barrameda, Spain.

The Spiritual Canticle (Spanish: Cántico Espiritual) is one of the poetic works of the Spanish mystical poet Saint John of the Cross.

Saint John of the Cross, a Carmelite friar and priest during the Counter-Reformation, was arrested and jailed by the Calced Carmelites in 1577 at the Carmelite Monastery of Toledo because of his close association with Saint Teresa of Ávila in the Discalced Carmelite reforms. He remained imprisoned for nine months in a cell, in bad conditions that caused him much suffering. He memorized, in the absence of the means to write them down, a thirty-one-stanza version of the Canticle. Some years later, after 1582, he wrote down the last stanzas in Baeza and Granada, the last five ones after a conversation with a nun, sister Francisca de la Madre de Dios.

Ana de Jesús asked him to write a comment to his poem, which he did in 1584. It was just Ana de Jesús who after being expelled from Spain took the poem with her, and finally it was published in Paris 1622, but in a French translation from Spanish (having not been published in the first Spanish collection of John's works of 1618). In 1627, it was published in the original Spanish in Brussels, and in the same year was published in Italian, at Rome. In Spain, the poem was first published in the Madrid edition of John's works of 1630.

== Content ==
In the Spiritual Canticle, John tries to explain the mystical process that follows the soul until it reaches its union with God. In order to achieve this, he uses an allegory: the search of (for?) the husband (Christ) by the wife (the human soul). The wife feels wounded by love, and this makes it start the search of the Beloved (el Amado); the soul asks everywhere for him in despair until they finally get together in the solitude of the garden (Paradise).

In relation to "the realities and experiences of this world", John teaches that all the goodness present in them "is present in God eminently and infinitely, or more properly, in each of these sublime realities is God".

== Versions ==
Two redactions of the Spiritual Canticle exist. The earlier version of thirty-nine stanzas is generally referred to as Canticle A, and is derived from the Manuscript of Sanlúcar. The later version, containing forty stanzas, is generally referred to as Canticle B, and is derived from the Manuscript of Jaén.

One twentieth-century debate concerned whether the Canticle B was John's own work, or that of another author. However, more recent works on John have been willing to accept the authenticity of the Canticle B.
