= Beas, Spain =

Beas
- Flag Coat of arms

- Location of Beas in Spain
- Coordinates: 37°25′N 6°47′W
- Country: Spain
- Autonomous community: Andalusia
- Province: Huelva

Area
  - Total: 144.66 km^{2} (55.85 sq mi)
- Elevation: 125 m (410 ft)

Population (2025-01-01)
  - Total: 4,414
  - Density: 30.51/km^{2} (79.03/sq mi)
- Time zone: UTC+1 (CET)
  - Summer (DST): UTC+2 (CEST)
- Website: www.aytobeas.es

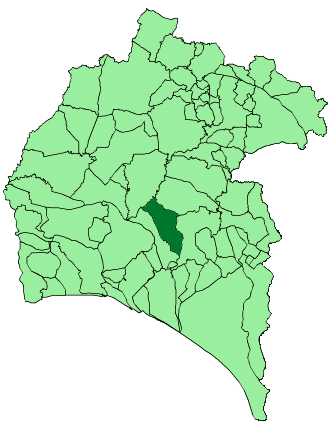
Map of Beas, Huelva

Beas is a municipality located in the province of Huelva, Spain. According to the 2025 municipal register, the village has a population of 4,414 inhabitants.

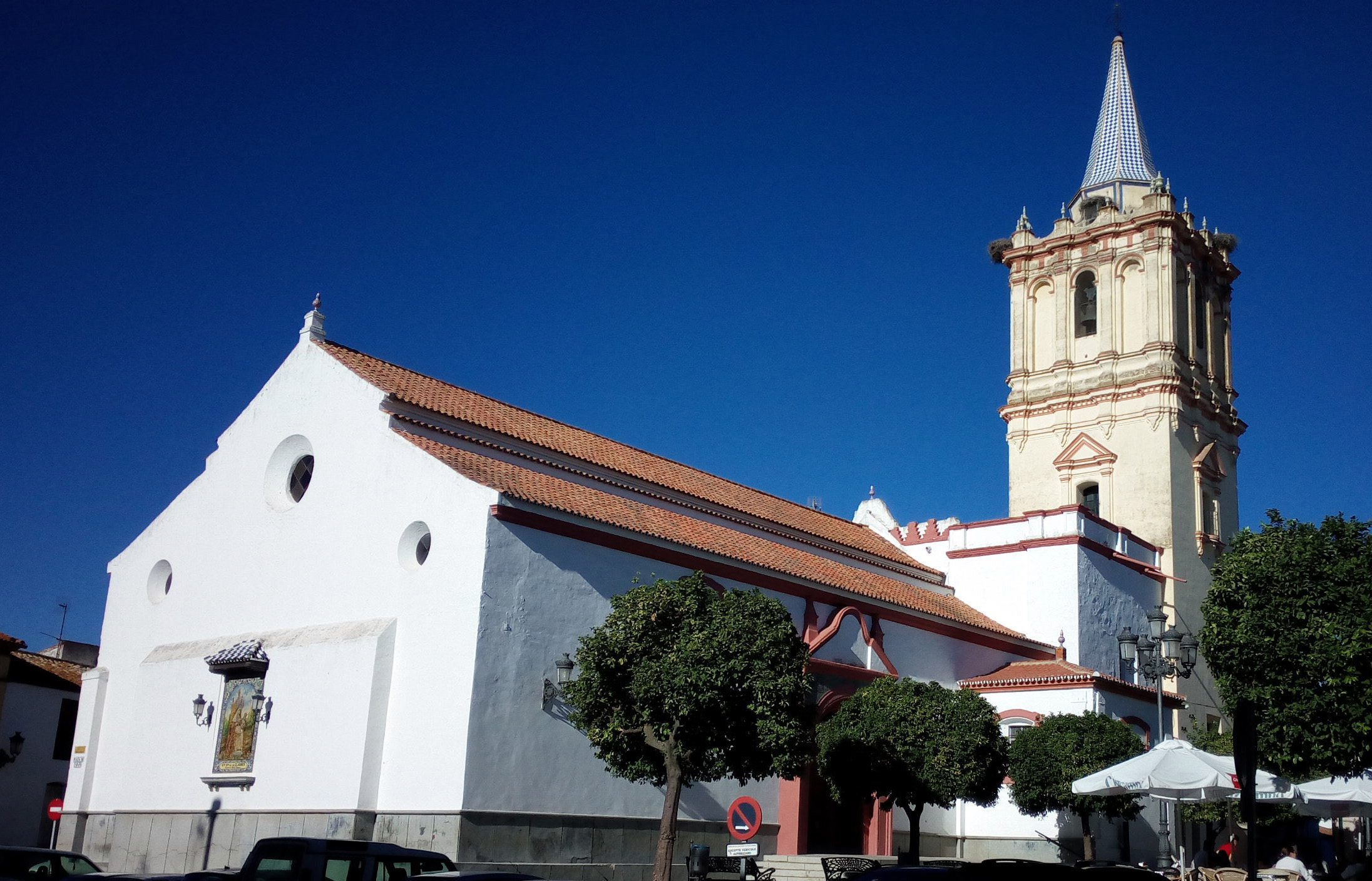
Parish Church of St. San Bartolomé Apóstol

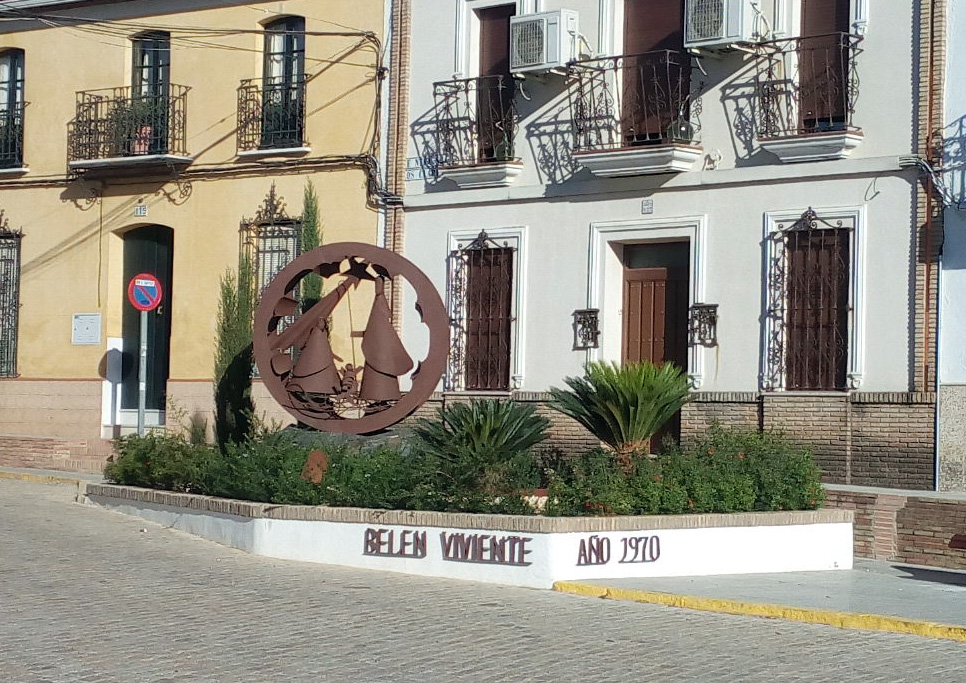
Monument dedicated to traditional Beas Living Nativity 1970

== Demographics ==
Historical population
Year	Pop.	±%
1999	4,165	—
2000	4,124	−1.0%
2001	4,085	−0.9%
2002	4,023	−1.5%
2003	4,036	+0.3%
2004	4,139	+2.6%
2005	4,162	+0.6%
2011	4,353	+4.6%

== See also ==
- List of municipalities in Huelva
