= List of South American Catholic saints =

The Catholic Church recognizes some deceased Catholics as saints, blesseds, venerables, and Servants of God. Some of these people were born, died, or lived their religious life in any of the territories of South America. The Catholic Church entered South America in 1500 through Brazil and quickly expanded across the continent with the Spanish and Portuguese cultures. Today this area remains heavily Catholic.

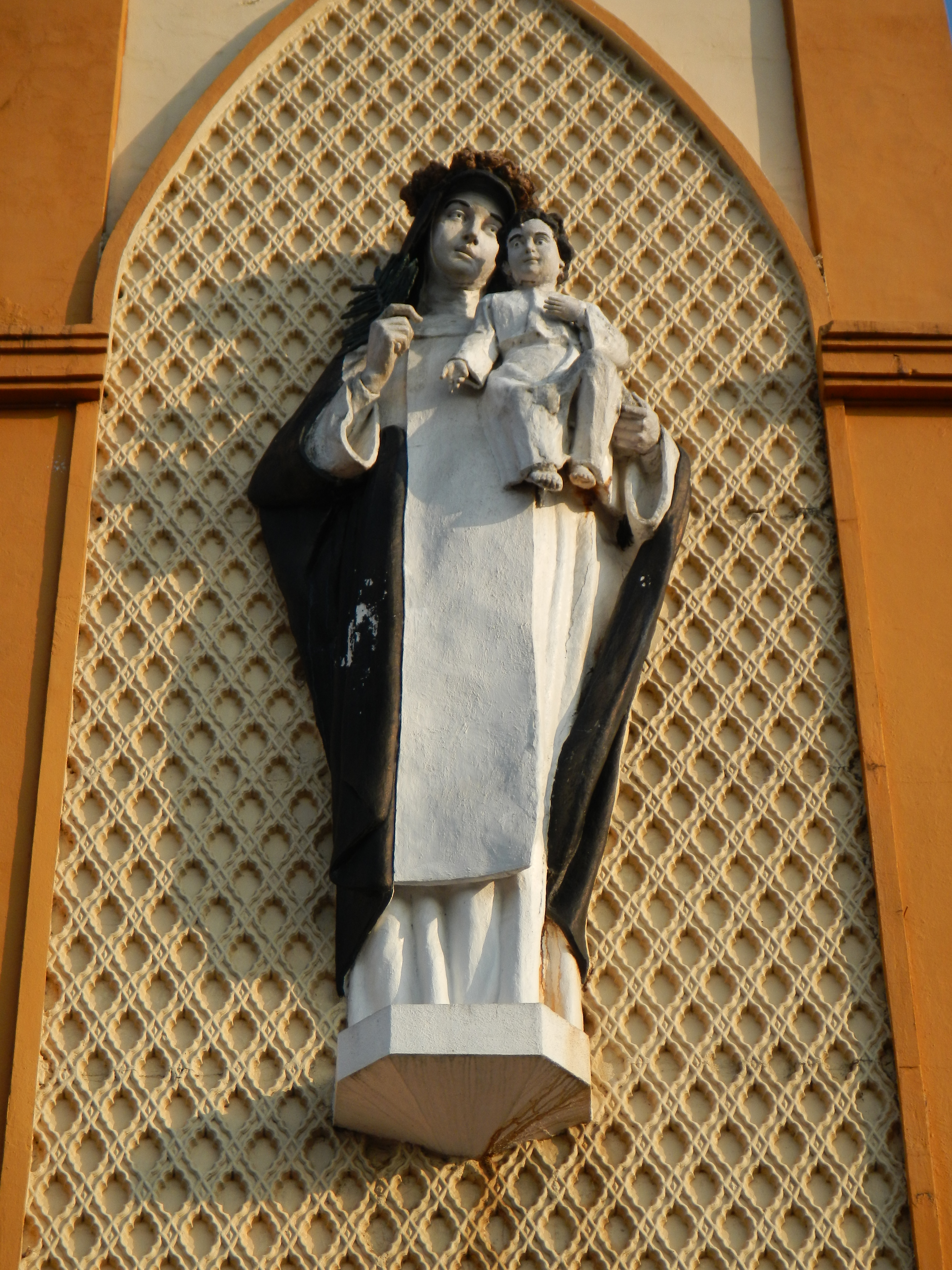
Image of St. Rose of Lima, the first person born in the Americas to be canonized, in the church at Paniqui

== List of saints ==
The following is the list of saints, including the year in which they were canonized and the country or countries with which they are associated.

- St. Louis Bertrand (1526–1581), Dominican priest (Colombia)
  - Beatified: 19 July 1608 by Pope Paul V
  - Canonized: 12 April 1671 by Pope Clement X
- St. Rose of Lima (1586–1617), Dominican tertiary (Peru)
  - Beatified: 15 April 1668 by Pope Clement IX
  - Canonized: 12 April 1671 by Pope Clement X
- St. Turibius of Mongrovejo (1538–1606), secular Archbishop (Peru)
  - Beatified: 2 July 1679 by Pope Innocent XI
  - Canonized: 10 December 1726 by Pope Benedict XIII
- St. Francis Solanus (1549–1610), Franciscan priest (Peru)
  - Beatified: 20 June 1675 by Pope Clement X
  - Canonized: 27 December 1726 by Pope Benedict XIII
- St. Peter Claver (1580–1654), Jesuit priest (Colombia)
  - Beatified: 21 September 1851 by Pope Pius IX
  - Canonized: 15 January 1888 by Pope Leo XIII
- St. Mariana de Jesús de Paredes (1618–1645), Third Order Franciscan (Ecuador)
  - Declared venerable: 19 March 1776
  - Beatified: 20 November 1853 by Pope Pius IX
  - Canonized: 9 July 1950 by Pope Pius XII
- St. Martin de Porres (1579–1639), Dominican brother (Peru)
  - Beatified: 29 October 1837 by Pope Gregory XVI
  - Canonized: 6 May 1962 by Pope John XXIII
- St. John Macias (1585–1645), Dominican brother (Peru)
  - Declared venerable: 2 February 1762
  - Beatified: 22 October 1837 by Pope Gregory XVI
  - Canonized: 28 September 1975 by Pope Paul VI
- St. Miguel Febres Cordero (1854–1910), De La Salle brother (Ecuador)
  - Declared venerable: 16 March 1970
  - Beatified: 30 October 1977 by Pope Paul VI
  - Canonized: 21 October 1984 by Pope John Paul II
- St. Roque González de Santa Cruz, Juan del Castillo, and Alfonso Rodríguez Olmedo (d. 1628), Jesuits (Paraguay and Peru)
  - Declared martyrdom: 3 December 1933
  - Beatified: 28 January 1934 by Pope Pius XI
  - Canonized: 16 May 1988 by Pope John Paul II
- St. Ezequiel Moreno y Díaz (1848–1906), Augustinian Recollect (Colombia)
  - Declared venerable: 1 February 1975
  - Beatified: 1 November 1975 by Pope Paul VI
  - Canonized: 11 October 1992 by Pope John Paul II
- St. Teresa of Jesus of Los Andes (1900–1920), Discalced Carmelite (Chile)
  - Declared venerable: 22 March 1986
  - Beatified: 3 April 1987 by Pope John Paul II
  - Canonized: 21 March 1993 by Pope John Paul II
- St. Pauline of the Agonizing Heart of Jesus (1865–1942), (Brazil)
  - Declared venerable: 8 February 1988
  - Beatified: 18 October 1991 by Pope John Paul II
  - Canonized: 19 May 2002 by Pope John Paul II
- St. Peter of Saint Joseph de Betancur (1626–1667), (Colombia)
  - Declared venerable: 25 July 1771
  - Beatified: 22 June 1980 by Pope John Paul II
  - Canonized: 30 July 2002 by Pope John Paul II
- St. Alberto Hurtado (1901–1952), Jesuit priest (Chile)
  - Declared venerable: 21 December 1991
  - Beatified: 16 October 1994 by Pope John Paul II
  - Canonized: 23 October 2005 by Pope Benedict XVI
- St. Antonio of Saint Anne (1739–1822), Franciscan friar and priest (Brazil)
  - Declared venerable: 8 March 1997
  - Beatified: 25 October 1998 by Pope John Paul II
  - Canonized: 11 May 2007 by Pope Benedict XVI
- St. Maria Bernarda Bütler (1848–1924), Franziskaner-Missionsschwestern von Maria Hilf (Colombia and Ecuador)
  - Declared venerable: 21 December 1991
  - Beatified: 29 October 1995 by Pope John Paul II
  - Canonized: 12 October 2008 by Pope Benedict XVI
- St. Narcisa de Jesús (1832–1869), laywoman (Ecuador and Peru)
  - Declared venerable: 23 October 1987
  - Beatified: 25 October 1992 by Pope John Paul II
  - Canonized: 12 October 2008 by Pope Benedict XVI
- St. Laura of Saint Catherine of Siena (1874–1949), Missionary Sister of Mary Immaculate and St. Catherine of Siena (Colombia)
  - Declared venerable: 22 January 1991
  - Beatified: 25 April 2004 by Pope John Paul II
  - Canonized: 12 May 2013 by Pope Francis
- St. José de Anchieta (1534–1597), Jesuit priest (Brazil)
  - Declared venerable: 10 August 1786
  - Beatified: 22 June 1980 by Pope John Paul II
  - Canonized: 3 April 2014 by Pope Francis
- St. André de Soveral and companions (d. 1645), priests and laypersons, martyrs (Brazil)
  - Declared venerable: 21 December 1998
  - Beatified: 5 March 2000 by Pope John Paul II
  - Canonized: 15 October 2017 by Pope Francis
- St. Nazaria Ignacia March Mesa (1889–1943), religious (Bolivia)
  - Declared venerable: 1 September 1988
  - Beatified: 27 September 1992 by Pope John Paul II
  - Canonized: 14 October 2018 by Pope Francis
- St. Dulce de Souza Lopes Pontes (1914–1992), Missionary Sister of the Immaculate Conception (Brazil)
  - Declared venerable: 3 April 2009
  - Beatified: 22 May 2011 by Cardinal Geraldo Majella Agnelo
  - Canonized: 13 October 2019 by Pope Francis
- St. Francesca Maria Rubatto (1844–1904), Capuchin Sister of Mother Rubatto (Uruguay)
  - Declared venerable: 1 September 1988
  - Beatified: 10 October 1993 by Pope John Paul II
  - Canonized: 15 May 2022 by Pope Francis
- St. Carmen Elena Rendiles Martínez, María Carmen (1903–1977), foundress, Servants of Jesus of Caracas (Venezuela)
  - Declared Venerable: 5 July 2013
  - Beatified: 16 June 2018 by Cardinal Angelo Amato
  - Canonized: 19 October 2025 by Pope Leo XIV
- St. José Gregorio Hernandez Cisneros (1864–1919), layman (Venezuela)
  - Declared Venerable: 16 January 1986
  - Beatified: 30 April 2021 by Archbishop Aldo Giordano
  - Canonized: 19 October 2025 by Pope Leo XIV

== List of blesseds ==
- Bl. Peter Donders (1809–1887), Redemptorist priest (Suriname)
  - Declared Venerable: 25 March 1945
  - Beatified: 23 May 1982 by Pope John Paul II
- Bl. Mercedes de Jesús Molina (1828–1883), foundress, Marianitas Sisters (Ecuador)
  - Declared Venerable: 27 November 1981
  - Beatified: 1 February 1985 by Pope John Paul II
- Bl. Ana de los Angeles Monteagudo (1602–1686), Dominican nun (Peru)
  - Declared Venerable: 23 May 1975
  - Beatified: 2 February 1985 by Pope John Paul II
- Bl. Laura Vicuña (1891–1904), child (Chile)
  - Declared Venerable: 5 June 1986
  - Beatified: 3 September 1988 by Pope John Paul II
- Bl. Arturo Ayala Niño and 6 (Rubén de Jesús López Aguilar, José Velázquez Peláez, Alfonso Antonio Ramírez Salazar, Gabriel Maya Gutiérrez, Ramón Ramírez Zuluoga, Luis Modesto Páez Perdomo) Hospitallers of Saint John of God and martyrs in Spain (d. 1936) (Colombia)
  - Declared Martyrdom: 14 May 1991
  - Beatified: 25 October 1992 by Pope John Paul II
- Bl. Laura Evangelista Alvarado Cardozo, María of Saint Joseph (1875–1967), Recollect nun (Venezuela)
  - Declared Venerable: 7 March 1992
  - Beatified: 7 May 1995 by Pope John Paul II
- Bl. Maria Vicenta Rosal (1815–1886), religious, Bethlemite Sisters, Daughters of the Sacred Heart of Jesus (Colombia and Ecuador)
  - Declared Venerable: 6 April 1995
  - Beatified: 4 May 1997 by Pope John Paul II
- Bl. Mariano de Jesús Euse Hoyos (1845–1926), diocesan priest (Colombia)
  - Declared Venerable: 3 March 1990
  - Beatified: 9 April 2000 by Pope John Paul II
- Bb. Maria of Jesus, Consuelo Aguiar-Mella Diaz and Maria Dolores Aguiar-Mella Diaz, Escolapia sister and two laywomen, Martyrs in Spain (d. 1936) (Uruguay)
  - Declared Martyrdom: 28 June 1999
  - Beatified: 11 March 2001 by Pope John Paul II
- Bl. Luigi Tezza (1841–1923), Camillian priest (Peru)
  - Declared Venerable: 24 April 2001
  - Beatified: 4 November 2001 by Pope John Paul II
- Bl. Luigi Variara (Luis Variara Bussa) (1875–1923), Salesian priest (Colombia)
  - Declared Venerable: 2 April 1993
  - Beatified: 14 April 2002 by Pope John Paul II
- Bl. Maria Josefa Karolina Brader (1860–1943), foundress, Franciscan Sisters of Mary Immaculate (Colombia and Ecuador)
  - Declared Venerable: 28 June 1999
  - Beatified: 23 March 2003 by Pope John Paul II
- Bl. Candlemas (Candelaria) of San José (Saint Joseph), [Susana Paz-Castillo Ramírez], (1863–1940), foundress, Hermanas Carmelitas de Madre Candelaria (Venezuela)
  - Declared Venerable: 19 April 2004
  - Beatified: 27 April 2008 by Cardinal José Saraiva Martins
- Bl. María Angélica Pérez (1897–1932), religious, Daughters of Our Lady of the Garden (Chile)
  - Declared Venerable: 22 June 2004
  - Beatified: 17 November 2012 by Cardinal Angelo Amato
- Bl. Maria Troncatti (1883–1969), Salesian sister (Ecuador)
  - Declared Venerable: 12 November 2008
  - Beatified: 24 November 2012 by Cardinal Angelo Amato
- Bl. Jesus Anibal Gomez y Gomez (1913–1936), Claretian and martyr in Spain (Colombia)
  - Declared Martyrdom: 1 July 2010
  - Beatified: 13 October 2013 by Cardinal Angelo Amato
- The Three Martyrs of Chimbote (Peru)
  - Michał Tomaszek (1960–1991), priest of Chimbote (Peru)
  - Zbigniew Adam Strzałkowski (1958–1991), priest of Chimbote (Peru)
  - Alessandro Dordi (1931–1991), priest of Chimbote (Peru)
    - Declared Martyrdom: 3 February 2015
    - Beatified: 5 December 2015 by Cardinal Angelo Amato
- Bl. Jesús Emilio Jaramillo Monsalve (1916–1989), religious priest of the Xaverian Missionaries of Yarumal and martyr (Colombia), Bishop of Arauca
  - Declared Martyrdom: 7 July 2017
  - Beatified: 8 September 2017 by Pope Francis
- Bl. Pedro María Ramírez Ramos (1899–1948), diocesan priest and martyr (Colombia)
  - Declared Martyrdom: 7 July 2017
  - Beatified: 8 September 2017 by Pope Francis
- Bl. María Guggiari Echeverría (1925–1959), Discalced Carmelite (Paraguay)
  - Declared Venerable: 27 March 2010
  - Beatified: 23 June 2018 by Cardinal Angelo Amato
- Bl. Victor Emilio Moscoso Cárdenas (1846–1897), Jesuit (Ecuador)
  - Declared Martyrdom: 12 February 2019
  - Beatified: 16 November 2019 by Cardinal Giovanni Angelo Becciu
- Bl. Antonia Luzmila Rivas López (María Augustina) (1920-1990), religious sister of the Religious of the Good Shepherd; Martyr (Peru)
  - Declared Martyr: 22 May 2021
  - Beatified: 7 May 2022 by Cardinal Baltazar Enrique Porras Cardozo
- Bl. Maria Berenice Duque Hencker (1898–1993), foundress of the Little Sisters of the Annunciation, (Colombia)
  - Declared Venerable: 12 February 2019
    - Beatified: 29 October 2022 by Cardinal Marcello Semeraro
- Bl. Jacinto Vera (1813–1881), Bishop of Montevideo (Uruguay)
  - Declared Venerable: 5 May 2015
    - Beatified: 6 May 2023 by Cardinal Paulo Cezar Costa

== List of venerables ==
- Ven. Francisco Camacho (1629–1698), Hospitaller of Saint John of God (Peru)
  - Declared Venerable: 1 January 1881
- Ven. Pedro Urraca (1583–1657), Mercedarian priest (Peru and Ecuador)
  - Declared Venerable: 31 January 1981
- Ven. Dorotea de Chopitea (1816–1891), lay Salesian (Chile)
  - Declared Venerable: 9 June 1983
- Ven. Mariano Avellana Lasierra (1844–1904), Claretian priest (Chile)
  - Declared Venerable: 23 October 1987
- Ven. Vicente Albistur (1562–1619), Dominican priest (Bolivia)
  - Declared Venerable: 22 January 1991
- Ven. Emilia de San Jose Chapellin Istúriz (1858–1893), foundress, Little Sisters of the Poor of Maiquetía (Venezuela)
  - Declared Venerable: 23 December 1993
- Ven. Isabel Tejada Cuartas (1887–1925), religious, Missionary Sisters of Mary Immaculate and Saint Catherine of Siena (Colombia)
  - Declared Venerable: 26 March 1994
- Ven. Julio Matovelle (1852–1929), secular priest and founder, Missionary Oblates of Sacred Hearts of Jesus and Mary (Ecuador and Venezuela)
  - Declared Venerable: 26 March 1994
- Ven. Teresa of the Cross Alvarez-Calderon (1875–1953), foundress, Canonesses of the Cross (Peru)
  - Declared Venerable: 3 April 2009
- Ven. Luisa Marcelina de San Jose Aveledo y Aveledo (1874–1959), foundress, Sisters of the Poor of Saint Peter Claver (Colombia and Venezuela)
  - Declared Venerable: 20 December 2012
- Ven. Rosa Elena Cornejo Pazmiño (1874–1964), founderess, Franciscan Missionaries of the Immaculata (Ecuador)
  - Declared Venerable: 20 December 2012
- Ven. Clemens Fuhl (1874–1935), Augustinian priest (Bolivia)
  - Declared Venerable: 9 December 2013
- Ven. Francisco Valdés Subercaseaux (1908–1982), Capuchin Bishop (Chile)
  - Declared Venerable: 7 November 2014
- Ven. Virginia Blanco Tardío (1916–1990), laywoman (Bolivia)
  - Declared Venerable: 22 January 2015
- Ven. Rafaél Manuel Almansa Riaño (1840–1927), religious priest of the Franciscan Friars Minor (Colombia)
  - Declared Venerable: 9 May 2016
- Ven. Andrés García Acosta (1800-1853), religious brother of the Franciscan Friars Minor (Chile)
  - Declared Venerable: 8 July 2016
- Ven. Octavio Ortiz Arrieta (1879–1958), Bishop of Chachapoyas (Peru)
  - Declared Venerable: 27 February 2017
- Ven. Ismael Perdomo Borrero (1872-1950), archbishop of Bogotá (Colombia)
  - Declared Venerable: 7 July 2017
- Ven. Tomás Morales Pérez (1908–1994), Jesuit; founder of the Secular Institutes of the Crusaders of Mary (Venezuela)
  - Declared Venerable: 8 November 2017
- Ven. Miguel Ángel Builes (1888–1971), Bishop of Santa Rosa de Osos (Colombia)
  - Declared Venerable: 19 May 2018
- Ven. Raffaella Veintemilla Villacís (1836–1918), foundress of the Congregation of the Augustinian Daughters of the Most Holy Saviour, (Ecuador), (Peru)
  - Declared Venerable: 7 November 2018
- Ven. Enrique Ernesto Shaw (1921–1962), businessman, (Argentina)
  - Declared Venerable: 24 April 2021
- Ven. Martin Fulgencio Elorza Legaristi (1899–1966), bishop of the territorial prelature of Moyobamba (Peru)
  - Declared Venerable: 5 August 2022
- Ven. Jesús Antonio Gómez Gómez (1895–1971) Diocesan priest (Colombia)
  - Declared Venerable: 5 August 2022
- Ven. Nicolás Ayllón (1632–1677), layman (Peru)
  - Declared Venerable: N/A
- Ven. Peter Bardesio, lay Franciscan (Chile)
  - Declared Venerable: N/A

In addition, Habig refers to Paul Emilian Reynaud, a Franciscan priest martyred in 1862 in Bolivia, of whom he says the "title of 'Venerable' has, it seems, been bestowed on him popularly, not officially."

== List of Servants of God ==
- Servant of God Luigi Bolla [Luigi Bolla Sartori] (Yankuam' Jintia) (1932-2013), Salesian of Don Bosco (Peru)
- Servant of God Julio César Duarte Ortellado (1906–1943), diocesan priest (Paraguay)
- Servant of God Ysabel Lagrange (1855–1933), Franciscan Sister of the Sacred Heart of Jesus (Venezuela)
- Servant of God Miguel Antonio Salas Salas (1915-2003), Eudist priest, archbishop of Mérida (Venezuela)
- Servant of God Mariana de Jesus Torres (1563–1635), Conceptionist nun (Ecuador)
- Servant of God Maria Esperanza de Bianchini (1928-2004), laywoman (Venezuela)
- Servant of God Joseph Walijewski (1924–2006), diocesan priest (Peru and Bolivia)
- Servant of God José Antonio Sarasola Uruláin (Barnabé of Larraul) (1907-1998), Franciscan Capuchin priest (Ecuador)
- Servant of God Amanda Gilseth Ruiz Suarez [Amandita] (1999-2005) (Venezuela)
- Servant of God Salvador García Pintos (1891-1956), layman (Uruguay)
- Servant of God Mercedes Reyes Sánchez (Mercedes of Saint Therese) (1930-2012), Discalced Carmelite nun (Colombia)
- Servant of God Lucio Leon Cardenas (1913-2010), layman (Venezuela)
- Servant of God Pedro Manuel Salado de Alba (1968–2012), layman (Ecuador)
- Servant of God Jose Cappel Farfsing [Joseph Henry Cappel] (1908–2004), Maryknoll Missionary priest (Chile)
- Servant of God Margarita Fonseca Silvestre (1884–1945), Servants of Christ the Priest (Colombia)
- Servant of God Alonzo de Barzana (ca. 1530–1597), Jesuit priest (Peru)
- Servant of God Andrea Aziani [Andres Aziani Samek-Lodovici] (1953–2008), layman (Peru)
- Servant of God Pablo Muñoz Vega (1903–1994), Jesuit priest, Archbishop of Quito, Cardinal (Ecuador)
- Servant of God Hernán Alessandri Morandé (1935–2007), Secular Institute of the Schoenstatt Fathers (Chile)
- Servant of God Juan Ignacio Larrea Holguín (1927–2006), Priest of the Personal Prelature of the Holy Cross and Opus Dei, Archbishop of Guayaquil (Ecuador)
- Servant of God Adolfo Rodriguez Vidal (1920–2003), Priest of the Personal Prelature of the Holy Cross and Opus Dei; Bishop of Santa Maria de Los Ángeles (Chile)
- Servant of God Daniel Badiali Massironi (1962–1997), priest (Peru)
- Servant of God Ramón Zubieta Les (1864–1921), bishop of Puerto Maldonado (Peru)
- Servant of God Emilio Lissón Chávez (1872–1961), Vincentinian priest (Peru)
- Servant of God John Joseph Mckniff (1872–1994), Augustinian priest (Peru)
- Servant of God Diego Ruiz Ortiz (1532–1571), Augustinian priest (Peru)
- Servant of God Luis López de Solís (1535–1606), Augustinian priest Bishop of Quito (Peru)
- Servant of God Rosa Mercedes de Castañeda Coello (1856–1950) Reparatrice of the Sacred Heart (Peru)
- Servant of God Francisco Tito Yupanqui (1540-1616), layman (Peru)
- Servant of God Serapio Rivero Nicolás (1917-2002), Augustinian priest (Peru)
- Servant of God Enrique Pèlach Feliu (1917-2007), Bishop of Abancay (Peru)
- Servant of God José Álvarez Fernández (1890-1970), Dominican priest (Peru)
- Servant of God Friedrich Kaiser Depel (1903-1993), Bishop of Caravelí (Peru)
- Servant of God Alfonso María De La Cruz Sardinas Zavala (1842-1902), Franciscan priest (Peru)
- Servant of God Melchora Saravia Tasayco (1895-1951), Secular Franciscan (Peru)
- Servant of God María Josefa Camila Del Carmen Álvarez Salas (1860-1924), Franciscan Sister of the Immaculate Conception (Peru)
- Servant of God Pío Sarobe Otaño (1855-1910), Franciscan priest (Peru)
- Servant of God Francisco del Castillo (1615-1673), Jesuit priest (Peru)
- Servant of God Juan de Alloza Menacho (1597-1666), Jesuit priest (Peru)
- Servant of God Luisa De La Torre Rojas (1819-1869), laywoman (Peru)
- Servant of God Nicolás De Dios Ayllón (1632-1677), layman (Peru)
- Servant of God Nicolasa Castillo Negrón (1894-1965), Franciscan Religious Sister of the Immaculate Conception of Mary (Peru)
- Servant of God Alejandro Labaka Ugarte (1920-1987), Apostolic vicar of Aguarico (Ecuador, Colombia)
- Servant of God Inés Arango Velásquez (1937-1987), Tertiary Capuchin Sister of the Holy Family (Ecuador), (Colombia)
- Servant of God José María Yerovi Pintado (1819-1867), Bishop of Quito (Ecuador)
- Servant of God José Ignacio Checa y Barba (1829-1877), Archbishop of Quito, martyr (Ecuador)
- Servant of God Francisco De Jesús Bolaños Rosero (1701-1785), Mercedarian priest (Ecuador, Colombia)
- Servant of God Angela Elena Muñoz Moral (1890-1911), laywoman (Ecuador)
- Servant of God Rafael Armando Fajardo Rodríguez (1871-1942), priest (Ecuador)
- Servant of God José Antonio Sarasola Uruláin (1907-1988), Capuchin friar and priest (Ecuador)
- Servant of God Julio Tobar Donoso (1894-1981), layman (Ecuador)
- Servant of God Juan María Riera Moscoso (1866-1915), Bishop of Guayaquil (Ecuador)
- Servant of God Carlos Crespi Croci (1891-1982), Salesian of Don Bosco (Ecuador)
- Servant of God Alberto Ferri Garavelli (1935-2009), Comboni Missionary of the Heart of Jesus (Ecuador)
- Servant of God Pedro Manuel Salado De Alba (1968-2012), layman (Ecuador)
- Servant of God Enrique Alvear Urrutia (1916-1982), Auxiliary bishop of Santiago de Chile (Chile)
- Servant of God Orazio de Vecchi Ghigi (1577-1612), Jesuit priest (Chile)
- Servant of God Martín de Aranda Valdivia (1556-1612), Jesuit priest (Chile)
- Servant of God Diego de Montalbán (1612), Jesuit (Chile)
- Servant of God Pedro de Bardeci Aguanico (1641-1700), Franciscan (Chile)
- Servant of God Mario Mariano Hiriart Pulido (1931-1964), layman (Chile)
- Servant of God Guillermo Hartl de Laufen (1904-1977), Capuchin priest, Apostolic vicar of Araucanía (Chile)
- Servant of God Rufino Zazpe Zabalza (1891-1977), Discalced Carmelite (Chile)
- Servant of God Esteban Gumucio Vives (1914-2001), priest of the Congregation of the Sacred Hearts of Jesus and Mary (Chile)
- Servant of God Josefa Fernández Concha (1835-1928), Religious of the Good Shepherd (Chile)
- Servant of God Bernarda Morin (1832-1929), Sister of Providence of Chile (Chile)
- Servant of God Andrés García Acosta (1800-1853), Franciscan friar (Chile)
- Servant of God María del Carmen Benavides y Mujica (1777-1849), Dominican tertiary (Chile)
- Servant of God Hernán Alessandri Morandé (1935-2007), priest of the Secular Institute of the Schoenstatt Fathers (Chile)
- Servant of God Antonio Rendic (1896-1993), layman (Chile)
- Servant of God Joseph Henry Cappel (1908-2004), Maryknoll Missionary Society priest (Chile)
- Servant of God Adolfo Rodríguez Vidal (1920-2003), priest of the Personal Prelature of the Holy Cross and Opus Dei Bishop of Santa María de Los Ángeles (Chile)
- Servant of God Pere Marcer Cuscó (1854-1927), Claretian priest (Chile)
- Servant of God María Patricia García García de Reyes (1924-2006), laywoman (Venezuela)
- Servant of God Abraham Reyes Díaz (1917-1988), deacon (Venezuela)
- Servant of God Luis Rafaél Tinoco Yepez (1915-1988), diocesan priest (Venezuela)
- Servant of God Martín Martínez Monsalve (1919-2006), diocesan priest (Venezuela)
- Servant of God Tomás Antonio Sanmiguel Díaz (1887-1937), Bishop of San Cristóbal de Venezuela (Venezuela)
- Servant of God María Geralda [Medarda] Guerrero García de Piñero (1885-1972), laywoman of the diocese of San Cristóbal de Venezuela
- Servant of God Eduardo Tomas Boza-Masvidal (1915-2003), auxiliary bishop of San Cristóbal de la Habana (Venezuela)
- Servant of God Mireya Asunta Escalante Innecco (1918-2003), Discalced Carmelite (Venezuela)
- Servant of God Sixto Sosa Díaz (1870-1943), Bishop of Cumania (Venezuela)
- Servant of God María Israel Bogotá Baquero (1943-1991), Carmelite of Mother Candelaria (Venezuela, Colombia)
- Servant of God Georgina Josefa Febres Cordero Troconis (1861-1925), Dominican Sister of Saint Rose of Lima (Venezuela)
- Servant of God Salvador Montes de Oca (1895-1944), Carthusian (Venezuela)
- Servant of God Arturo Celestino Álvarez Valverde (1870-1952), Bishop of Calabozo (Venezuela)
- Servant of God José Alí Lebrún Moratinos (1919-2001), Archbishop of Caracas, cardinal (Venezuela)
- Servant of God Juana Josefa Bermúdez Pirela (1898-1993), Little Sister of the Poor of Maiquetía (Venezuela)
- Servant of God Cesáreo Gil Atrio (1922-1997), Diocesan Laborer Priest of the Sacred Heart of Jesus (Venezuela)
- Servant of God José María Zapico Díaz (1883-1945), Dominican priest (Venezuela)
- Servant of God Arístides Calvani Silva (1918-1986), layman (Venezuela)
- Servant of God Adela Rina Abbo Fontana de Calvani (1919-1986), laywoman (Venezuela)
- Servant of God Saturnino Ibarguren Guridi (1856-1927), Jesuit priest (Colombia)
- Servant of God Luís María Zuluaga Zuluaga (1888-1982), diocesan priest (Colombia)
- Servant of God Ana María Lozano Díaz (1910-1982), Daughter of the Sacred Hearts of Jesus and Mary (Colombia)
- Servant of God Agustín de Gormáz Velasco [Agustín de Coruña] (1508-1589), Augustinian priest Bishop of Popayán (Colombia)
- Servant of God María Ligia Arango Siegert (1915-1984), Discalced Carmelite (Colombia)
- Servant of God Marcos Dionisio Sánchez Lozano (1887-1970), diocesan priest (Colombia)
- Servant of God María Sara Alvarado Pontón (1902-1980), Dominican Daughter of Our Lady of Nazareth (Colombia)
- Servant of God Enrique Alberto Higuera Barrera (1906-1976), Dominican priest (Colombia)
- Servant of God María De Jesús Upegui Moreno (1835-1921), Servant of the Blessed Sacrament and Charity (Colombia)
- Servant of God José Benedicto Soto Mejía (1904-1973), diocesan priest (Colombia)
- Servant of God Toribio Maya Sarmiento (1848-1930), layman (Colombia)
- Servant of God Jorge Murcia Riaño (1895-1944), diocesan priest (Colombia)
- Servant of God Emilio Sotomayor Luque (1900-1983), diocesan priest of the archdiocese of Bogotá (Colombia)
- Servant of God Rafael García Herreros Unda (1909-1992), Eudist priest (Colombia)
- Servant of God Nicolás Rodríguez Campo [Nicolau Rodrigues] (1830-1900), Jesuit priest, Colombia)
- Servant of God Ana Maria Moreno Del Castillo (1887–1977), laywoman (Panama)
- Servant of God Pedro Lahoud Saade (1932-1995), priest of the archdiocese of Caracas (Venezuela)
- Servant of God Maria Esperanza de Bianchini (1928-2004), laywoman of the dioceses of Los Teques and Metuche, (Venezuela)
- Servant of God Ignacio Larrañaga (1928–2013), spanish Capuchin priest; founder of the Prayer and Life Workshops (Chile)

== Candidates for sainthood ==
Others have been proposed for beatification, and may have active groups supporting their causes. These include:

- Gabriel García Moreno (1821–1875), layman and President (Ecuador)
- Eugenio Biffi (1829–1896), priest of the Pontifical Institute for Foreign Missions; bishop of Cartagena (Colombia)
- Sara Colonia Zambrano [Sarita] (1914–1940), Young Laywoman of the Archdiocese of Lima (Peru)
- Clemente Díaz Rodríguez (1848–1905), priest of the diocese of San Bernardo; founder of the Sisters of Mercy of Maipo (Chile)
- Luís Espinal Camps (1932–1980), spanish Jesuit priest and activist; Martyr (Bolivia)
- Nicolás Pakarati Urepotahi (1860-1927) and Elizabet Rangitaki Temaki Urepotahi (1869-1949), laypersons from the Diocese of Villarrica; Catechists (Chile)
- Omayra Sánchez (1972–1982), young laywoman of the diocese of Líbano–Honda (Colombia)
- Roque Jacinto Solaque (1968–1996) layman, mystic and stigmatized (Colombia)
- María de la Cruz Morínigo (1931–1996), married laywoman of the diocese of Posadas and activist (Paraguay)
- Isaías Duarte Cancino (1939–2002), archbishop of Cali; Martyr (Colombia)
- José María Masià Vidiella (1815-1902) religious priest of the Franciscan Friars Minor, bishop of Loja (Peru), (Ecuador)
- Antonio Porturas Plaza (1922-1988) religious priest of the Franciscan Friars Minor (Peru)
- Vicente Hondarza Gómez (1935-1983), priest of the Spanish Foreign Mission Institute (Peru)
- Irene Mccormack (1938-1991), religious sister of the Sisters of Saint Joseph of the Sacred Heart of Jesus (Peru)
- Giulio Rocca (1962-1992), layman of the diocese of Como (Peru)
- Bernardo Calle González (1876-1904), priest of the Augustinians (Peru)
- Manuel García Marina (1892-1926), religious priest of the Dominicans (Peru)
- José Arnaldo Alba (1892-1937), religious priest of the Dominicans (Peru)
- Joan Sawyer (1932-1983), religious sister of the Sisters of Saint Columban (Peru)
- Carlos Riudavets Montes (1945-2018), Jesuit (Peru)
- Paul McAuley (1947-2019), religious brother of the De La Salle Brothers (Peru)
- Aldo Menghi (1944-1995), religious brother of the Congregation of the Schools of Charity, Cavanis Institute (Ecuador)
- Mirosław Józef Karczewski (1965-2001), religious priest of the Conventual Franciscans (Ecuador)
- Víctor Betancourt Ruiz (1966-2008), Jesuit (Ecuador)
- José María Caro Rodríguez (1886-1958), archbishop of Santiago; cardinal (Chile)
- Joan Alsina Hurtós (1942-1973), priest of the diocese of Girona, Fidei Donum missionary (Chile)
- Gerardo Poblete Fernández (1942-1973), religious priest of the Salesians of Don Bosco (Chile)
- André Joachim Jarlan Pourcel (1941-1984), priest of the diocese of Rodez, Fidei Donum missionary (Chile)
- Roberto de Jesús Berríos Gaínza (1885-1975), religious priest of the Franciscan Friars Minor; bishop of San Felipe (Chile)
- Felisa Urrutia Langarica (1913-1991), religious priest of the Carmelite Sisters of Charity (Venezuela)
- Bernard Darke (1925-1979), Jesuit (Guyana)
- Georges Bouvier (1928-2002), religious priest of the Congregation of the Holy Spirit (Spiritans) (French Guiana, France)
- Álvaro Ulcué Chocué (1943-1984), diocesan priest of the archdiocese of Popayán (Colombia)
- Hubert Gillard (Daniel) (1936-1985), religious priest of the Augustinians of the Assumption (Colombia)
- Jaime León Restrepo López (1943-1988), priest of the archdiocese of Medellín (Colombia)
- Teresita Ramírez Vargas (1947-1989), religious sister of the Company of Mary (Colombia)
- Sergio Restrepo Jaramillo (1939-1989), Jesuit (Colombia)
- Tiberio Fernández Mafla (1943-1990), diocesan priest of the diocese of Buga (Colombia)
- Hildegard Maria Feldmann (1936-1990), laywoman of the diocese of Ipiales; missionary of the Society of Bethlehem Mission Immensee (Colombia)
- Jaime Gutiérrez Álvarez (Abel Andrés) (1924-1991), religious brother of the, Brothers of the Christian Schools (De La Salle Brothers) (Colombia)
- Alcides Jiménez Chicangana (1949-1998), priest of the diocese of Mocoa-Sibundoy (Colombia)
- Miguel Ángel [Michel] Quiroga Gaona (1972-1998), religious brother of the Society of Mary (Marianists) (Colombia)
- Yolanda Cerón Delgado (1958-2001), religious sister of the Company of Mary (Colombia)
- Marta Inés Vélez Serna (1958-2002), religious sister of the Sisters of the Poor of Saint Peter Claver (Colombia)
- Gabino Orduz Lamus (1931), priest of the diocese of Málaga-Soatá (Colombia)
- José de Los Santos Ruiz (1932), priest of the archdiocese of Nueva Pamplona (Colombia)
- Modest Arnaus Saurina (1896-1947), religious priest of the Claretians (Colombia)
- Simon de Zorroza (1948), religious priest of the Passionists (Colombia)
- Luis Mariano Torres (1924-1950), religious priest of the Company of Mary (Montfort Missionaries) (Colombia)
- Jaime Castillo Walteros (1950), diocesan priest of the diocese of Apartadó (Colombia)
- Teodoro Sánchez (1957), diocesan priest of the diocese of Ibagué (Colombia)
- Javier Ciríaco Cirujano Arjona (1925-1993), priest of the diocese of Plasencia; Fidei Donum missionary in the archdiocese of Cartagena (Colombia)
- Isaías Duarte Cancino (1939-2002), archbishop of Cali (Colombia)
- Marta Inés Vélez Serna (1958-2002), religious sister of the Sisters of the Poor of Saint Peter Claver (Colombia)
- Pedro Schumacher Niessen (1839-1900), religious priest of the Congregation of the Mission (Vincentians); bishop of Portoviejo (Colombia)
- Clemente Giraldo Jiménez (1840-1933), diocesan priest of the diocese of Sonsón-Rionegro (Colombia)
- Emilio Botero González (1884-1961), bishop of Pasto (Colombia)
- Iván Betancur Betancur (1940-1975), diocesan priest of the archdiocese of Medellín (Colombia)
- María Elena Bolívar Vargas (1975), laywoman of the archdiocese of Medellín (Colombia)
- Alvaro López Sora (1959-1998), religious priest of the Redemptorists (Colombia)
- Celina Posada Uribe (1954- 1998), religious sister of the Missionary Sisters of Saint Therese of the Child Jesus (Colombia)
- Bernardo De La Espriella Mosquera (1890-1944), Jesuit (Colombia)
- Jesús Héctor Gallego Herrera (1938-1971), diocesan priest of the diocese of Santiago de Veraguas (Colombia)
- Luz Marina Valencia Triviño (1952-1987), religious sister of the Missionaries of the Immaculate Conception (Colombia)
- Ariel Granada Serna (1941-1991), religious priest of the Consolata Missionaries (Colombia)
- Lucía Peñacoba Núñez (1980), religious sister of the Religious Missionaries of the Immaculate Conception (Colombia)

== See also ==
- List of Central American and Caribbean Saints
- List of Argentine saints
- List of Brazilian Saints
- List of Mexican saints
- List of saints of the Canary Islands

== Other references ==
- Ewald, Daniel P. (2009). Saints and Blesseds of the Americas. Xlibris. ISBN 978-1-4363-6761-5.
- Habig, Marion A. (1974). Saints of the Americas. Our Sunday Visitor. ISBN 0-87973-880-4.
- "Hagiography Circle"
