= Cerro do Inhacurutum =

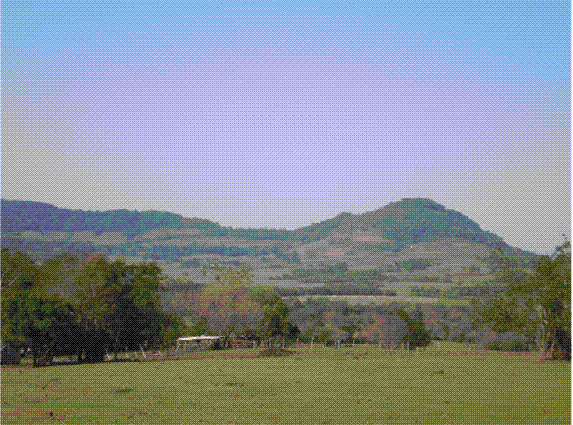
The Cerro do Inhacurutum hill as seen from a distance

Cerro do Inhacurutum is a 304.15 meters high hill as measured from sea level; and 176.20 meters high from a local GPS measurement; latitude: 28° 01′ 50″, longitude: 55° 03′ 06″. The name Inhacurutum is of Guarani language origin. The hill is located in the municipality of Roque Gonzales, in the northwest of the state of Rio Grande do Sul, Brazil. It is approximately 734 meters high at sea level and 176 meters high at the site, being the highest point in the municipality.

== Historical reference ==
Guarani Indian chief, cacique Nheçu (Note: spelled Ñezú in Spanish; with alternative graphic representations of this name both in Spanish and in Portuguese) commanded resistance to the first European colonizing incursions in what is today's southernmost state of Brazil, Rio Grande do Sul from this place; especially because of the privileged natural visual advantage that it offers.

Traditionally most historians have treated the events regarding this aspect of the colonization of the region as a separate chapter of the history of Rio Grande do Sul, however this is changing.

From this centrally located operations' base cacique Nheçu supposedly ordered the assassination of Jesuit priests Roque González de Santa Cruz, Afonso Rodrigues, and Juan del Castillo in 1628 when they were killed. Today these three Jesuits are considered martyrs by the Catholic Church and are venerated throughout the region as such.

== Surrounding area ==
Small farm holdings characterize the surrounding area, with emphasis on soybeans, corn, wheat, cassava; raising cattle, pigs, chickens and other domesticated animals are also seen in the region neighboring the Inhacurutum hill. The international river port of Porto Xavier is also located not far away in the same area (officially the Porto Internacional de Porto Xavier, in Portuguese; and Puerto Internacional de la Barca San Javier, in Spanish).

== Tourism ==
There is some tourism development in the area with guided tours to the hilltop when prearranged locally.

== Language ==
The language spoken in the area is Brazilian Portuguese, the national language of Brazil. Many people in the area understand Spanish. Also, at home and in small communities the language of the first settlers is still spoken, that is Riograndenser Hunsrückisch and East Pomeranian German.

== See also ==
- Indian Reductions
- Jesuit Reductions
- Misiones Orientales (called Sete Povos, in Portuguese).
- Society of Jesus (the Jesuits)
- Spanish Empire
