= List of Argentine Catholic saints =

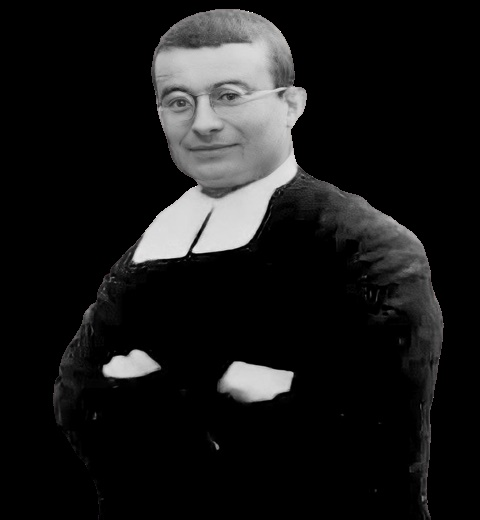
Hector Valdivielso Saez, the first person born in Argentina to be canonized.

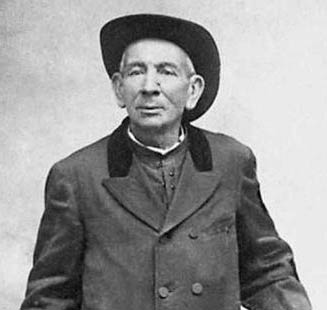
Jose Gabriel del Rosario Brochero, the first person who died in Argentina to be canonized.

This page is a list of Argentine saints, blesseds, venerables, and Servants of God, as recognized by the Roman Catholic Church.

== List of saints ==
- St. Benito de Jesus (born Hector Valdivielso Saez) (1910–1934), De La Salle Brother and martyr of Turon.
  - Declared martyrdom: 7 September 1989
  - Beatified: 29 April 1990 by Pope John Paul II
  - Canonized: 21 November 1999 by Pope John Paul II
- St. Jose Gabriel del Rosario Brochero (1840–1914), diocesan priest.
  - Declared venerable: 19 April 2004
  - Beatified: 14 September 2013 by Cardinal Angelo Amato
  - Canonized: 16 October 2016 by Pope Francis
- St. Nazaria Ignacia March Mesa (1889–1943), religious.
  - Declared venerable: 1 September 1988
  - Beatified: 27 September 1992 by Pope John Paul II
  - Canonized: 14 October 2018 by Pope Francis
- St. Artémides Zatti (1880–1951), Salesian brother.
  - Declared venerable: 7 July 1997
  - Beatified: 14 April 2002 by Pope John Paul II
  - Canonized: 9 October 2022 by Pope Francis
- St. María Antonia de Paz y Figueroa (1730–1799), Daughter of the Divine Savior.
  - Declared venerable: 1 July 2010
  - Beatified: 27 August 2016 by Cardinal Angelo Amato
  - Canonized: 11 February 2024 by Pope Francis

== List of blesseds ==
- Bl. Laura Vicuña (1891–1904), child of the diocese of Viedma.
  - Declared Venerable: 5 June 1986
  - Beatified: 3 September 1988 by Pope John Paul II
- Bl. Ceferino Namuncurá (1886–1905), young layperson of the diocese of Viedma.
  - Declared Venerable: 22 June 1972
  - Beatified: 11 November 2007 by Cardinal José Saraiva Martins
- Bl. María Angélica Pérez (1897–1932), religious, Daughters of Our Lady of the Garden.
  - Declared Venerable: 22 June 2004
  - Beatified: 17 November 2012 by Cardinal Angelo Amato
- Bl. Saturnina Rodríguez de Zavalía (Catalina of Mary) (1823–1896), founderess, Handmaids of the Heart of Jesus.
  - Declared Venerable: 18 December 1997
  - Beatified: 25 November 2017 by Cardinal Angelo Amato
- The Martyrs of La Rioja
  - Carlos de Dios Murias (1945–1976), priest of La Rioja.
  - Gabriel Longueville (1931–1976), priest of La Rioja.
  - Wenceslao Pedernera (1936–1976), layperson of the diocese of La Rioja.
    - Declared Martyrdom: 8 June 2018
    - Beatified: 27 April 2019 by Cardinal Giovanni Angelo Becciu
- Bl. Enrique Angelelli (1923–1976), Bishop of La Rioja.
  - Declared Martyrdom: 8 June 2018
  - Beatified: 27 April 2019 by Cardinal Giovanni Angelo Becciu
- Bl. Mamerto Esquiú (1826–1883), Franciscan friar.
  - Declared Venerable: 16 December 2006
  - Beatified: 4 September 2021 by Cardinal Luis Héctor Villalba
- The Martyrs of Zenta
  - Pedro Ortiz de Zàrate (1622–1683), priest of the Diocese of Orán
  - Giovanni Antonio Solinas (1643–1683), professed priest of the Society of Jesus
    - Declared Martyrdom: 13 October 2021
    - Beatified: 2 July 2022 by Cardinal Marcello Semeraro
- Bl. Eduardo Francisco Pironio (1920–1998) Cardinal-Bishop of Sabina-Porto Mirteto.
  - Declared Venerable: 18 February 2022
  - Beatified: 16 December 2023 by Cardinal Fernando Vérgez Alzaga

== List of venerables ==
- Ven. Camila Rolón (1842–1913), foundress, Poor Sisters of Saint Joseph of Buenos Aires.
  - Declared Venerable: 2 April 1993
- Ven. Jose Leon Torres (1849–1930), Mercedarian priest.
  - Declared Venerable: 26 March 1994
- Ven. Maria Benita Arias (1822–1894), foundress, Sisters Servants of Jesus in the Sacrament.
  - Declared Venerable: 27 January 2014
- Ven. Isidoro Zorzano Ledesma (1902–1943), member of Opus Dei.
  - Declared Venerable: 21 December 2016
- Ven. Leonor de Santa María Ocampo (1841–1900), Dominican nun.
  - Declared Venerable: 19 May 2018.
- Ven. María Eufrasia Iaconis, (1867–1916), foundress, Daughters of the Immaculate Conception.
  - Declared Venerable: 13 May 2019.
- Ven. Enrique Ernesto Shaw (1921–1962), married layperson of the archdiocese of Buenos Aires.
  - Declared Venerable: 24 April 2021
- Ven. José Marcos Figueroa (1865–1942) Jesuits priest.
  - Declared Venerable: 17 December 2022

== List of Servants of God ==
- Servant of God Manuel Costa de los Rios (prob. 1604–1686), layperson of the archdiocese of Mercedes-Luján.
- Servant of God Jorge María Salvaire (1847–1899), Vincentian priest.
- Servant of God Maria Mercedes del Niño Jesús Guerra (1817–1901), foundress, Franciscan Tertiary Sisters of Charity.
- Servant of God María Antonia Cerini (1839–1911), foundress, Sisters of Saint Anthony of Padua.
- Servant of God Elmina Paz Gallo (1833–1911), widow; foundress, Dominican Sisters of the Holy Name of Jesus.
- Servant of God Josefa Fernández Concha (1835–1928), professed religious, Religious of the Good Shepherd.
- Servant of God José Américo Orzali (1863–1939), archbishop of San Juan de Cuyo; founder, Sisters of Our Lady of the Rosary.
- Servant of God Federico (Friedrich) Grote (1853–1940), Redemptorist priest.
- Servant of God Isabel Fernández del Carmen (1881–1942), foundress, Missionary Sisters of Saint Francis Xavier.
- Servant of God José (Giuseppe) Canovai (1904–1942), priest.
- Servant of God Antonio de Jesús Lobo (1837–1942), priest, Franciscan Friars Minor.
- Servant of God Mercedes del Carmen Pacheco (1867–1943), foundress, Missionary Catechist Sisters of Christ the King.
- Servant of God Julio César Duarte Ortellado (1906–1943), diocesan priest.
- Servant of God Antonio Solari (1861–1945), layperson of the archdiocese of Buenos Aires.
- Servant of God Pascual Pirozzi (1886–1950), priest, Missionaries of the Sacred Hearts.
- Servant of God José Jorge Bunader (1889–1952), married layperson of the eparchy of San Charbel en Buenos Aires; member, Secular Franciscans.
- Servant of God Mauricio Jiménez Artiga (1881–1954), priest.
- Servant of God Victorina Rivara de Perazzo (1867–1957), married layperson of the diocese of Goya; Salesian Cooperators.
- Servant of God Alfonso (Alphonsus) Lambe (1932–1959), layperson of the archdiocese of Buenos Aires; Legion of Mary.
- Servant of God Sofronia Seferina Erdely (1884–1961), professed religious, Sisters of the Order of Saint Basil the Great.
- Servant of God Secundina Guadalupe Olmos (Pura Rosa del Carmen) (1897–1965), professed religious, Carmelite Tertiary Sisters of Saint Teresa of Jesus.
- Servant of God Luis María Etcheverry Boneo (1917–1971), priest; founder, Association of Consecrated Virgins.
- Servant of God Argentino del Valle Larrabure (1932–1975), married layperson and military officer; Martyr.
- The Pallottine Martyrs
  - Servant of God Pedro Eduardo Dufau (1908–1976), priest.
  - Servant of God Alfredo Leaden (1919–1976), priest.
  - Servant of God Alfredo José Kelly (1933–1976), priest.
  - Servant of God Salvador Barbeito Doval (1946–1976), seminarian.
  - Servant of God Emilio José Barletti (1952–1976), seminarian.
- Servant of God Tarcisio Rubín (1946–1976), priest.
- Servant of God María Cecilia Perrín (1957–1985), married layperson of the archdiocese of Bahía Blanca. (Note: Daughter of the Servant of God Manuel Pascual Perrín (1925–2000))
- Servant of God Mayorina Josefa Para Scaglia (María de Lourdes del Santísimo Sacramento) (1900–1988), professed religious, Religious of the Incarnate Word.
- Servant of God Victorino Fiz Galende (1902–1989), priest.
- Servant of God Dante Di Stéfano (1951–1989), layperson of the archdiocese of Santa Fe de la Vera Cruz; Salesian Cooperators.
- Servant of God Carlos Rodolfo Yaryez (1966–1990), young layperson of the archdiocese of Paraná.
- Servant of God Diego Gutiérrez Pedraza (1894–1990), augustinian priest; bishop of Cafayate.
- Servant of God Mario Pantaleo (1915–1992), priest.
- Servant of God Antonio Sagrera Gayá (1904–1992), priest.
- Servant of God Jorge Gottau (1917–1994), Redemptorist priest; bishop of Añatuya.
- Servant of God Clara María Segura (1978–1995), young layperson of the archdiocese of Buenos Aires.
- Servant of God Víctor Manuel Schiavoni (1977–1995), young layperson of the archdiocese of Paraná.
- Servant of God Martha Pereyra Iraola (1913–1998), professed religious, Society of the Religious of the Sacred Heart of Jesus.
- Servant of God Salustiano Míguelez Romero (1919–1999), augustinian priest.
- Servant of God Manuel Pascual Perrín (1925–2000), married layperson of the archdiocese of Bahía Blanca. (Note: Father of the Servant of God María Cecilia Perrín (1957–1985).)
- Servant of God Adela Sesso (Maria Benedetta of the Immaculate) (1918–2001), professed religious, Poor Sister of Saint Joseph of Buenos Aires.
- Servant of God Jorge Novak (1928–2001), Divine Word Missionary priest, Bishop of Quilmes.
- Servant of God Guillermo Muzzio (1972–2002), Seminarian of the Diocese of San Miguel.
- Servant of God María Cruz López (1986–2006), young layperson of the archdiocese of Paraná.
- Servant of God Juan Ignacio Larrea Holguín (1927–2006), Priest of the Personal Prelature of the Holy Cross and Opus Dei, Archbishop of Guayaquil.
- Servant of God José Zilli (1924–2008), priest.
- Servant of God Martín Martín Martín (1923–2011), priest of the Diocesan Laborer Priests of the Sacred Heart of Jesus.
- Servant of God Cecilia Maria of the Holy Face (1973–2016), professed religious, Discalced Carmelites.

== Candidates for sainthood ==
The following persons have been publicly proposed for causes of beatification.

- Ángel José Toro (1830–1904), bishop of Córdoba; founder, Dominican Tertiary Sisters of Saint Joseph.
- José Aníbal Verdaguer (1877–1940), bishop of Mendoza; founder, Catechist Worker Sisters of Jesus in the Blessed Sacrament.
- Carlos Mugica (1930–1974), priest of the archdiocese of Buenos Aires; Martyr.
- Jordán Bruno Genta (1909–1974), married layperson of the archdiocese of Buenos Aires; Martyr.
- Carlos Alberto Sacheri (1933–1974), married layperson of the archdiocese of Buenos Aires; Martyr.
- Raúl Alberto Amelong (1922–1975), married layperson of the archdiocese of Santa Fe de la Vera Cruz; Martyr.
- Carlos Mariano Pérez (1907–1985), salesian priest; Bishop of Comodoro Rivadavia; Archbishop of Salta.
- María de la Cruz Morínigo (1931–1996), married layperson of the diocese of Posadas.
- Germán Orduna (1926–1999), married layperson of the diocese of Buenos Aires.
- Pocho Lepratti (1966–2001), layperson of the archdiocese of Santa Fe de la Vera Cruz.
- Pedro Richards (1911–2004), passionists priest; founder, Christian Family Movement.
- Nínawa Daher (1979–2011), layperson of the Maronite Catholic Eparchy of San Charbel in Buenos Aires.
- Raúl Marcelo Scozzina (1979–2011), bishop of Formosa.
- Alberto Ibáñez Padilla (1927–2015), jesuits priest; founder, Convivencia con Dios Community.

== See also ==
- List of Central American and Caribbean Saints
- List of Brazilian Saints
- List of Mexican saints
- List of saints of the Canary Islands
