= Nheçu =

Guarani Indian leader in 17th-century Brazil

Nheçu (Portuguese pronunciation: [ɲeˈsu]) or Chief Nheçu was a Guaraní chief who lived during the 17th century in the region of today's municipality of Roque Gonzales, in the Western part of the state of Rio Grande do Sul, in the south of Brazil. Historical records left behind by the first European settlers and their descendants indicate that in 1628, Nheçu ordered the killing of one native Paraguayan and two Spanish Jesuit missionaries: Roque Gonzales, João de Castilho and Afonso Rodrigues (all three name spellings here are in Brazilian Portuguese). These were the first three Europeans to enter this region of southern Brazil, as far as it is known. Today, they are celebrated as martyrs by the Catholic Church, especially in that part of the Americas.

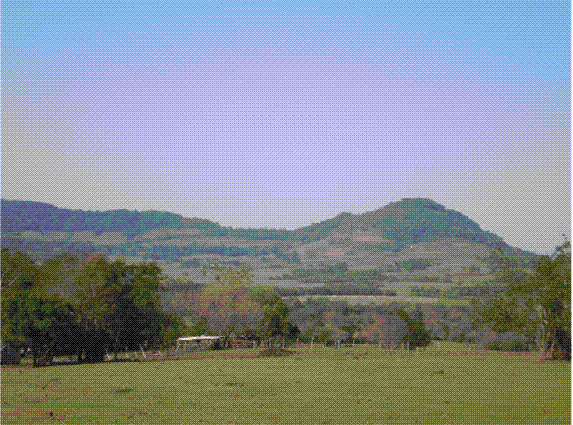
Cerro do Inhacurutum is the historic hill where Chief Nheçu held post while fighting back the incursion of the first Europeans in today's state of Rio Grande do Sul, in southern Brazil.

The center of rule and control of Chief Nheçu is said to have been Cerro do Inhacurutum, an unusual elevation in the form of a hill located in the Ijui river valley. It was also from this place that he tried to resist and stem European colonization, a campaign that ultimately was in vain with the establishment of the Jesuit Missions in the region.

Today there are very few descendants of the Guaraní people in the original territory commanded by Chief Nheçu. However, the area is well populated by European immigrants and their descendants, the Portuguese language prevailing, with some communities still speaking (mostly in the home) dialects of German, Russian, Polish, Italian languages, etc.

== See also ==
- Sepé Tiaraju
- Jesuit Reductions
