= Guggiari =

Guggiari is a surname. It may refer to:

- Hermann Guggiari (1924–2012), Paraguayan engineer and sculptor
- José Patricio Guggiari (1884–1957), president of Paraguay
- María Guggiari Echeverría, in religious María Felicia de Jesús Sacramentado - was a Paraguayan Roman Catholic professed religious from the Discalced Carmelite Order
