= Teresa of the Andes =

Chilean nun of the Discalced Carmelite Order

Saint Teresa of Jesus of Los Andes OCD
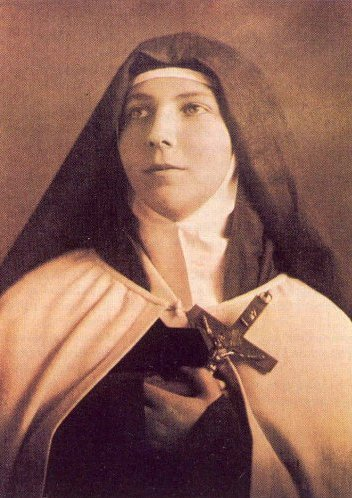
- Portrait of Saint Teresa of Jesus of Los Andes which was taken prior to her entry in the Carmel of Los Andes

Virgin
- Born: Juana Enriqueta Josefina de Los Sagrados Corazones Fernández Solar; 13 July 1900; Santiago, Chile
- Died: 12 April 1920 (aged 19); Los Andes, Chile
- Venerated in: Catholic Church
- Beatified: 3 April 1987, O'Higgins Park, Santiago, Chile by Pope John Paul II
- Canonized: 21 March 1993, Saint Peter's Basilica, Vatican City by Pope John Paul II
- Major shrine: Shrine of Saint Teresa of Los Andes
- Feast: 12 April; 13 July (Discalced Carmelites)
- Attributes: Discalced Carmelite habit, crucifix

Teresa of Jesus of Los Andes, OCD (Spanish: Teresa de Jesús de Los Andes; born Juana Enriqueta Josefina de Los Sagrados Corazones Fernández Solar; 13 July 1900 – 12 April 1920) was a Chilean Discalced Carmelite. Her named is based on the place of her death, Los Andes, Chile.

Fernández Solar was a pious child but had an often unpredictable temperament for she could be prone to anger and being vain but could also demonstrate her charitable and loving nature; she seemed transformed when she decided to become a nun and her character seemed to change for her sole ambition was to dedicate herself to the service of God. However her time in the convent was cut short due to her contracting an aggressive disease that killed her – she knew she would die but was consoled knowing she would be able to make her profession before she died.

Her canonization process opened on 23 April 1976 under Pope Paul VI and she became titled as a Servant of God. The confirmation of her life of heroic virtue on 22 March 1986 allowed for her to be titled as Venerable. Solar was beatified on 3 April 1987 in Chile after a miracle attributed to her from her native land cleared her for beatification while another miracle coming from Chile led Pope John Paul II to canonize her as a saint on 21 March 1993 in Saint Peter's Basilica.

== Life ==
Juana Enriqueta Josefina de los Sagrados Corazones Fernández Solar was born in 1900 in Santiago in Chile to the upper class Miguel Fernández and Lucia Solar as the fourth of six children; three males and two females not including herself. Her brothers were Luis and Miguel and Ignacio and her sisters were Lucía and Rebeca (d. 31 December 1942). Rebeca became a Discalced Carmelite nun at the same convent as Juana as "Teresa of the Divine Heart". Her mother was Lucía Solar de Fernández, her father was Miguel Fernández Jara and her maternal grandfather was Eulogio Solar. Her baptism was celebrated in the parish church of Santa Ana.

Fernández Solar received her education in a college managed by French religious sisters from the Congregation of the Sacred Heart, and she remained there from 1907 until 1918. In 1914, she decided to consecrate herself to the Lord and become a Discalced Carmelite. On 8 December 1915, she made a vow to remain chaste and she renewed it on a regular basis. Fernández Solar was pious in character, but could also be stubborn and vain; she also lost her temper on some occasions. On one particular occasion, her sister Rebeca grew so fed up with Juana that she hit her while the red-faced Juana grabbed her with anger but stopped and kissed her cheek. Rebeca was confused and unsure but chased her off and said: "Get out of here! You have given me the kiss of Judas!" Juana was hospitalized in 1913 for acute appendicitis. In her childhood, she also liked singing and dancing and played croquet and tennis. She was an able swimmer and could play the piano and harmonium. In 1916, she made a retreat for the Spiritual Exercises.

In her childhood, she read the autobiographical account that Thérèse of Lisieux had written and the experience had a profound effect on her pious and innocent character while also coming to the realization that she wanted to live for God alone. Fernández Solar had to work to overcome her initial self-centered character towards that of one directed to the caring of others above all. Her further inspiration for this self-transformation was her upcoming First Communion which led her to this commitment in an effort to achieve worthiness of what she was soon to receive. Fernández Solar received her Confirmation on 22 October 1909 and made her First Communion later on 11 September 1910. In September 1917 she sent a letter to the prioress of the Discalced Carmelite convent close to her home expressing her desire to enter the order. In late 1917 she and her mother left church and she turned to her mother in abruptness and asked whether she knew she would become a religious to which her mother told her that decision was for her father to make. Solar did not pursue it until from school she sent a letter to her father on 25 March 1919 that received no response; she returned home for a brief period but did not mention it and her father never alluded to it either but before she left for school again he consented when she asked him about it.

On 7 May 1919 she entered the novitiate of the Discalced Carmelites in Los Andes and received her religious name "Teresa of Jesus". She received the habit on 14 October. Toward the end of her life she began an apostolate of letter-writing in which she shared her thoughts on the spiritual life. She soon contracted typhus, which was diagnosed as fatal. However, some historians have suggested that she might have contracted Spanish flu, which was devastating Chile at this time. In any case, her condition grew worse on 2 April 1920, Good Friday. Although still three months short of turning 20 and six months to complete her novitiate, she was allowed to profess her vows "in articulo mortis" ("facing death") on 7 April 1920. She received the final sacraments on 5 April 1920 and died at 7:15pm on 12 April 1920, one week after Easter. Her remains were relocated in 1940 to a new chapel.

== Sainthood ==
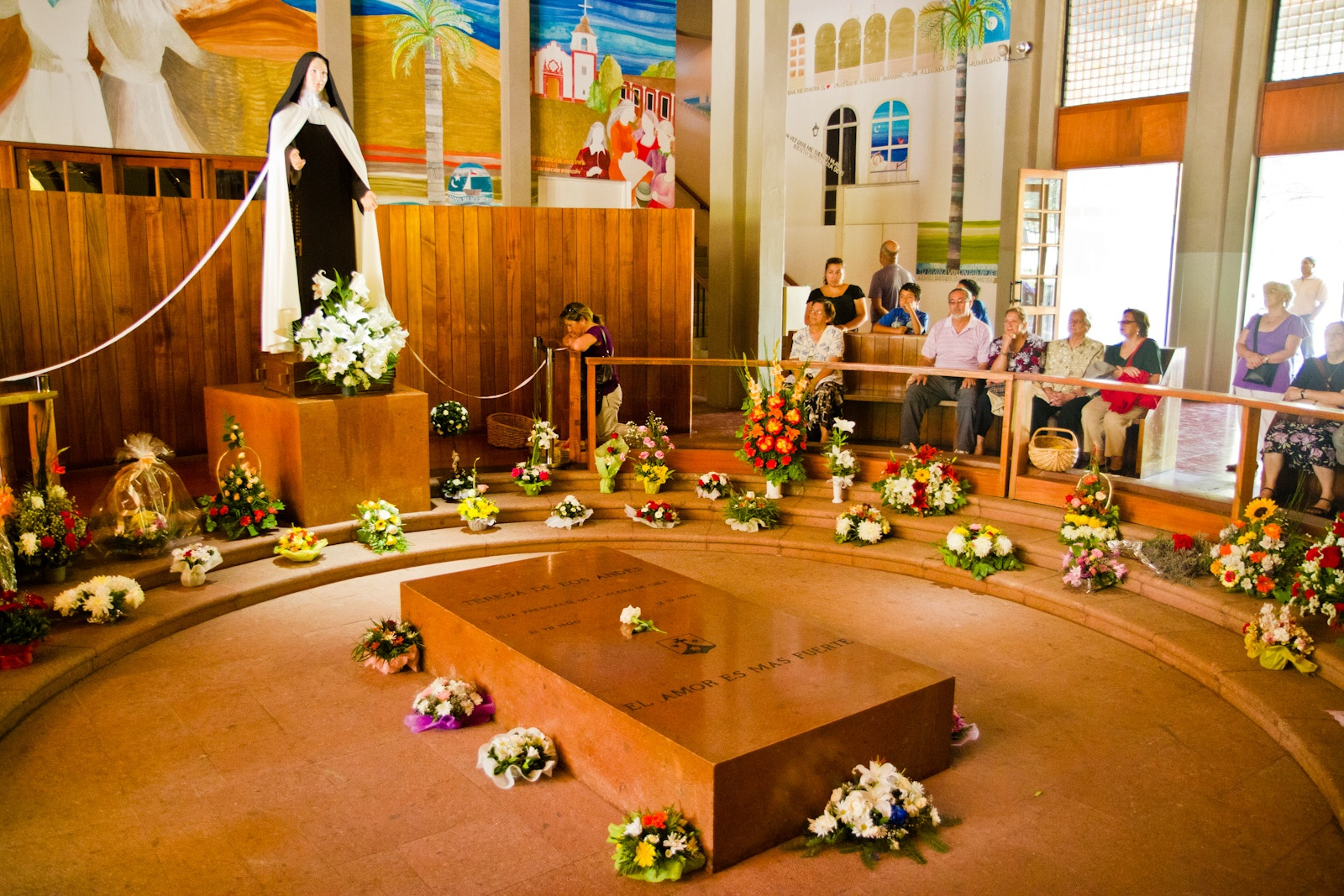
Tomb of Saint Teresa of Jesus of Los Andes, bearing the inscript "El amor es mas fuerte ("Love is stronger" [than death])

Teresa of Jesus remains popular with the estimated 100 000 pilgrims who visit on an annual basis the shrine where her remains are venerated in the Shrine of Saint Teresa of Los Andes in Los Andes. The nun is Chile's first saint and the first Discalced Carmelite saint from outside of Europe.

The beatification process began on 23 April 1976 under Pope Paul VI and Teresa was titled as a Servant of God. The positio was submitted to the Congregation for the Causes of Saints in 1985. The confirmation of Teresa's life of heroic virtue on 22 March 1986 allowed for Pope John Paul II to title her as venerable. A miracle attributed to her intercession was validated by the Congregation on 23 May 1986. John Paul II approved miracoulous healing on 16 March 1987 and beatified Teresa of the Andes on 3 April 1987. This was done in O'Higgins Park in Chile while her brother Luis was present at her beatification; he was the last direct relative of hers still alive then.

The process for a second miracle attributed to her was confirmed by John Paul II on 11 June 1992. The canonisation was celebrated on 21 March 1993 at Saint Peter's Square.

== In popular media ==
Her life was used for a Chilean television miniseries spanning from 6 August until 10 September 1989 starring Paulina Urrutia as Teresa of Jesus. Other films have been made about her life.

She was also mentioned in the 2016 TV miniseries, The Young Pope.

== See also ==
- Constitutions of the Carmelite Order
