= The Vision of Saint Alphonsus Rodriguez =

Painting by Francisco de Zurbarán

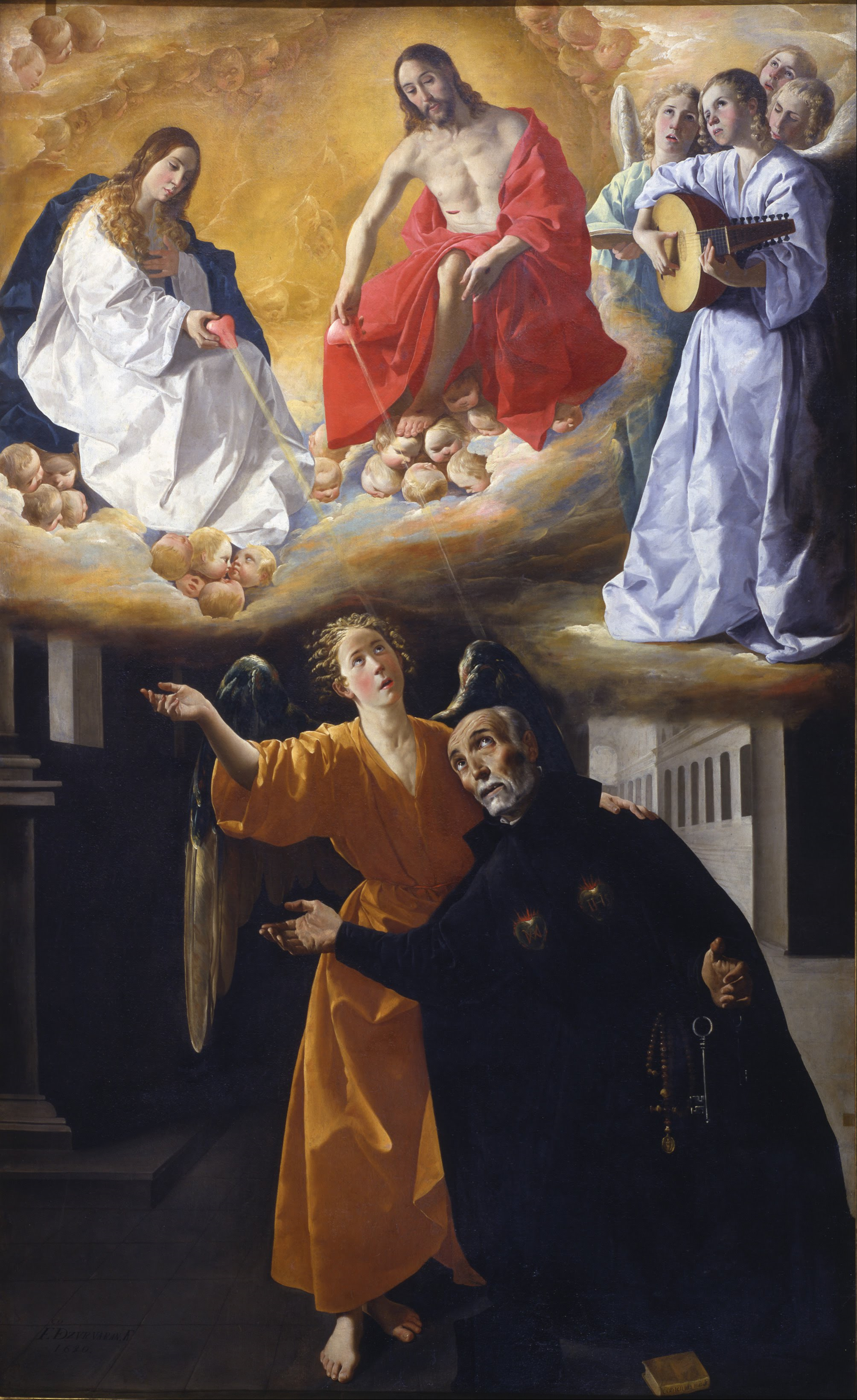
The Vision of Saint Alphonsus Rodriguez (1630) by Francisco de Zurbarán

The Vision of Saint Alphonsus Rodriguez is a 1630 oil painting on canvas by the Spanish painter Francisco de Zurbarán, now in the Real Academia de Bellas Artes de San Fernando in Madrid. It shows a vision of Jesuit Saint Alphonsus Rodriguez. The painting was commissioned by the Jesuits. The art historian Julián Gállego has described it as one of Zurbarán's "most beautiful works" and says that its "stage-effects" of "heavenly and earthly areas arranged as if they were shelves" account for much of its originality and expressive power.
