= Alfonso Rodríguez Olmedo =

Spanish Jesuit priest and missionary

Saint Alfonso Rodríguez Olmedo S.J.
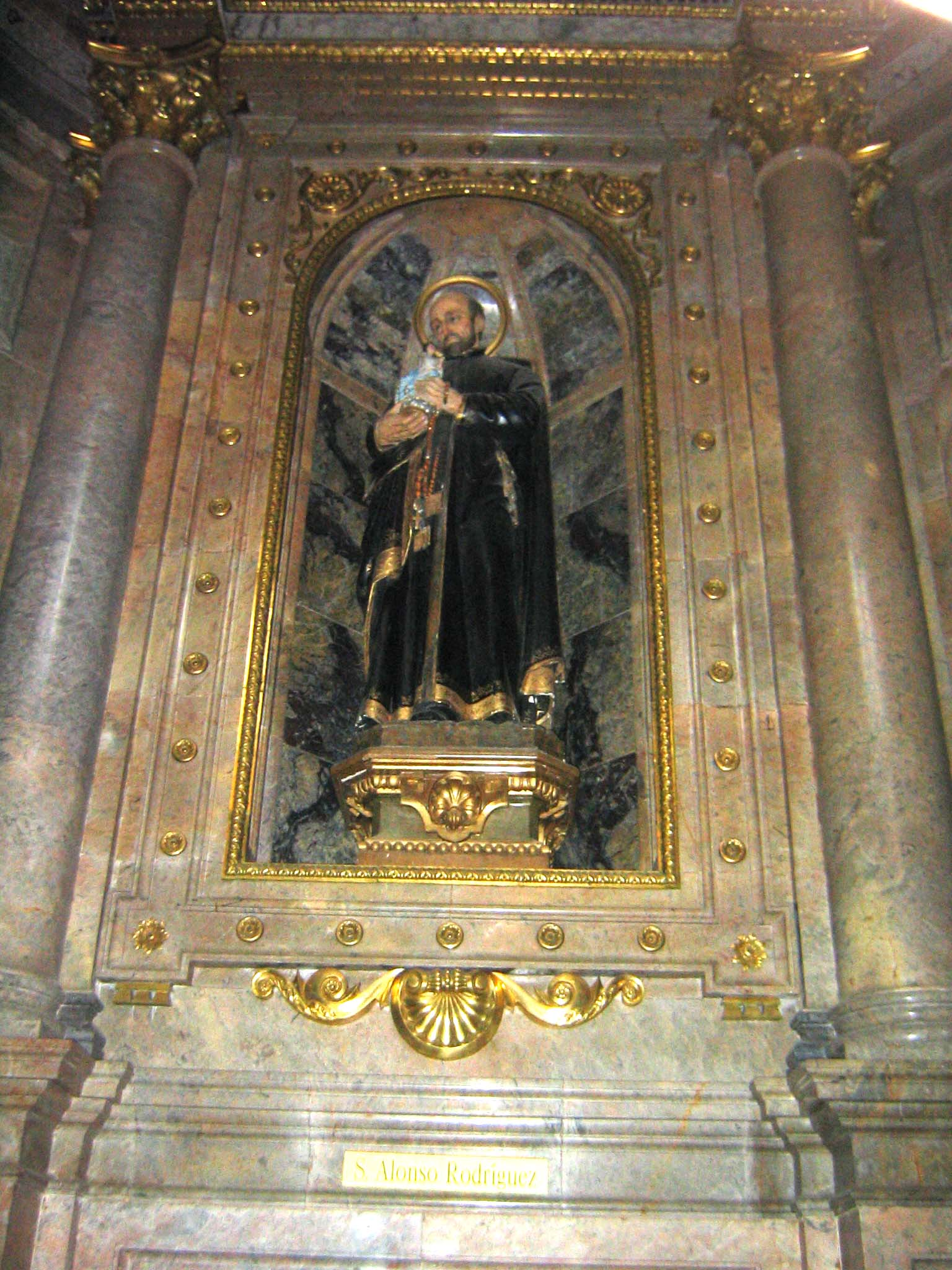

Religious, priest, missionary & martyr
- Born: 10 March 1598; Zamora, Crown of Castile
- Died: 15 November 1628 (aged 30); Mission of Todos los Santos de Caaró, Captaincy of Rio Grande do Sul, State of Brazil, Portuguese Empire
- Venerated in: Catholic Church (Society of Jesus & Paraguay)
- Beatified: January 28, 1934 by Pope Pius XI
- Canonized: May 16, 1988 by Pope John Paul II
- Feast: 16 November

Alfonso Rodríguez Olmedo (10 March 1598 – 15 November 1628) was a Spanish Jesuit priest who was sent as a missionary among the Guarani people in Paraguay. He is honored as a martyr and saint by the Catholic Church.

== Life ==
Rodríguez was born in the city of Zamora, Spain on March 10, 1598. He did his novitiate in Villagarcía de Campos, Valladolid and was later sent to Paraguay. He left Lisbon, Portugal on an expedition led by Father Juan de Viana.

In 1626, he was sent to the Guaycuru missions, which were in front of Asunción, on the other side of the Paraguay River. He was the first missionary to learn the local language, and his mission was to preach and to facilitate the spread of the faith and ensure decent living conditions for indigenous people.

In 1628, he went to the Guaraní missions of Paraná and then to Itaipú. He was appointed to accompany Roque González y de Santa Cruz in the founding of the town of Todos los Santos de Caaró, on the eastern bank of the Uruguay River. But Ñezú, a sorcerer and chieftain of Igní, opposed the project and gave the order to kill the missionaries. On November 15, 1628, while they were gathered in the plaza to witness the installation of a bell, the indigenous people appeared suddenly and in the midst of the confusion, they hit González on the head. Upon hearing the noise, Rodríguez left the church and was also beaten to death by a stone mallet called an itaizá. Their bodies were dragged to the church and burned with paintings and images. Juan de Castillo suffered the same fate a few days later, being assassinated on November 17, 1628.

Juan Eusebio Nieremberg, who was a classmate of the three martyrs, wrote their biographies in 1644.

== Veneration ==
Rodríguez was beatified by Pope Pius XI on 28 January 1934. He and his companions, Juan de Castillo and Roque González y de Santa Cruz, were later canonized by Pope John Paul II in Asunción, Paraguay.
