= Emilia de San José =

Venezuelan nun, venerable

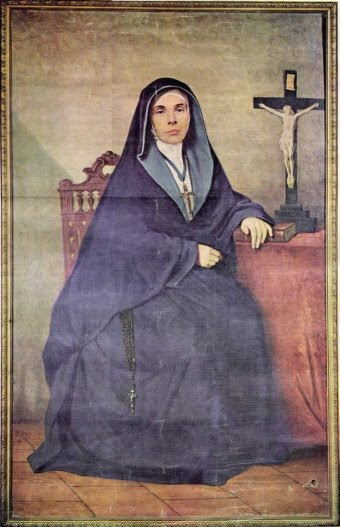
Emilia de San José

Emilia de San José, born Emilia Chapellín Istúriz, (7 December 1858 – 18 January 1893) was a Venezuelan religious sister, considered venerable by the Catholic Church. She founded in 1890 the Congregation of the Little Sisters of the Poor in Maiquetia, which became the first Catholic religious congregation established in Venezuela since 1874, when President Antonio Guzman Blanco closed all religious establishments. She also founded and directed the San José de Maiquetía Hospital.

== Life ==
Emilia Chapellín Istúriz was born on 7 December 1858 in Caracas, Venezuela into a family of Ramón Chapellín and Trinidad Istúriz. She was baptized on 12 January 1859 in the Cathedral of Caracas.

In 1887, she traveled to Curaçao to join a congregation of the Third Order of Saint Francis, due to the non-existence of religious communities in Venezuela, but she spent only seven months there, due to serious health problems. In 1888, Chapellín enrolled in the Pious Association of San José in Maiquetía. On September 25, 1889, she established the San José de Maiquetía Hospital, where she dedicated herself full time to serving the sick. In 1890, she founded the Congregation of the Sisters of the Poor Maiquetia, with the aim of caring for the poor, sick and homeless. She established the congregation and the hospital with the help of the Venezuelan priest Santiago Machado, parish priest of the San Sebastián de Maiquetía Church.

On 25 October 1889, she received the religious habit and on 19 April 1890, she made her first vows. She made her perpetual vows on 11 December 1892, in articulo mortis. Emilia de San José died of tuberculosis on 18 January 1893, after receiving communion. Her grave is in the inner courtyard of the Hospital San José de Maiquetía.

== Beatification process ==
The beatification process of Emilia de San José began on 7 December 1957. The process was approved by the Holy See on February 24, 1979. In April 1992, the process on a miracle attributed to Mother Emilia, which occurred at the Padre Machado Dispensary was formalized. On December 23, 1993, Emilia de San José was declared venerable by Pope John Paul II.
