= Bernarda Morin =

Canadian Catholic religious sister

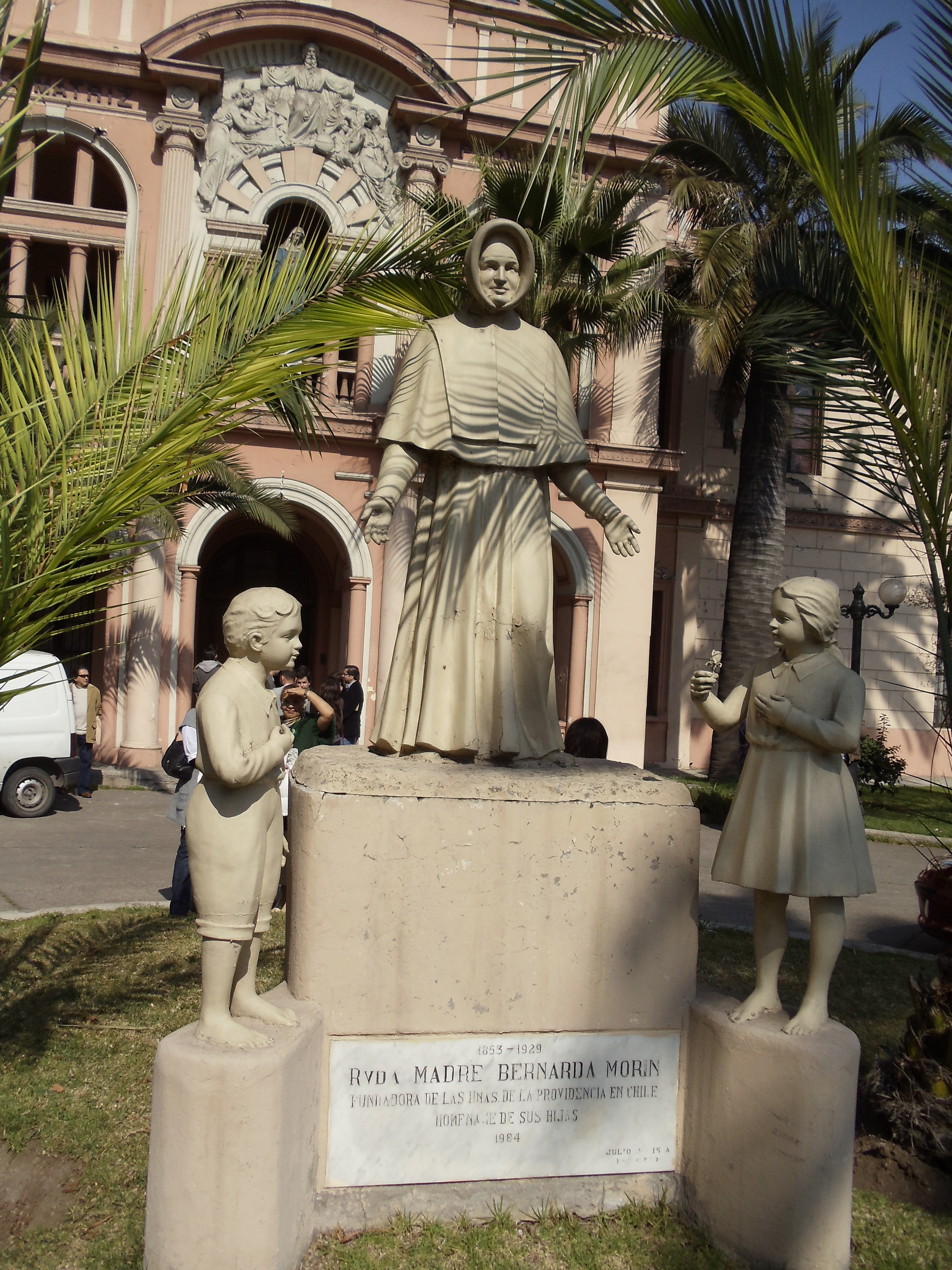
Statue of Bernarda Morin in Santiago of Chile, in front of the Mother Church of the Congregation

Bernarda Morin (born Venerance Morin Rouleau; 1832–1929) was a Canadian religious sister who founded the Congregation of the Sisters of Providence in Chile, a spin-off of the congregation of the Sisters of Providence in Montreal.

== Life ==
Morin was born on December 29, 1832, in Saint-Henri-de-Lévis, a rural village of Québec, Canada, and baptised Venerance Morin Rouleau. She entered the novitiate of the congregation of the Sisters of Charity of Providence in Montreal on 11 May, 1850. Six months afterwards, on November 21, she received the habit and her religious name Bernarda on 22 August, 1852, she made her perpetual vows.

In October 1852, with four other sisters, Morin was sent to Oregon to found an establishment of Providence. Once in Oregon City, the sisters found out that the situation was not favourable to the practice of the community works. They decided, as a faster way to communicate with their superiors in Montreal, to sail from San Francisco on March 30, 1853, in a Chilean vessel. After an agitated trip of 78 days, the Elena docked in Valparaiso on 17 June. Practically incapable of returning to Canada because of health issues, they put themselves at the disposal of the Archbishop of Santiago, Valentín Valdivieso, who missioned them for the administration of an orphanage while expecting the approval of their Canadian Superiors.

With the permission of their Superiors, the Sisters of Providence opened a novitiate in Santiago on 3 January, 1857. Victoire Larroque, cofounder of the Community of Montreal, served as the superior. When Larroque died the following month, Bernarda Morin became superior of the Motherhouse of Santiago. The congregation received the help of the president Manuel Montt for their support to the abandoned children. On 12 March, 1880, Pope Leo XIII decreed that the Chilean province be transformed into an autonomous order, with the name of Congregation of the Sisters of Providence of Chile. The constitutions were approved by the Pope Pío X, on 7 January, 1905.

On June 27, 1925, Bernarda Morin received the highest decoration of the country, the Medal of the Merit, from the hands of the president Arturo Alessandri. She died the on 4 October, 1929, in Santiago of Chile. She is buried in the Church of the Motherhouse of the Congregation of the Sisters of Providence in Santiago. It is the Church that she had built herself in 1892.

== Beatification process ==
In 1995, the process of her beatification was opened, and the diocesan process was finalised in April 2010.

== Legacy ==
In its years in Chile, the Congregation of the Sisters of Providence has founded high schools, elementary schools, homes for young children, teenage and elderly and has attended house of orphans and hospitals. The sisters also assisted the patients and prisoners. On January 24, 2011, a fire burned the House, the interior of the church, the museum, the novitiate and the women home. Bernarda Morin and Joseph Pariseau contributed to the expansion of the Congregation of the Sisters of Providence around the world.The first day of June 1970, the Chilean sisters incorporated themselves back with the Congregation of Montreal. The sisters of Chile and Argentina now form the Bernarda Morin Province.

== Bibliography ==
- ALIAGA ROJAS, fernando, La entrega sin retorno, Santiago de Chile: Congregación Hermanas de la Providencia – Chile, 2002.
