= Tomás Morales Pérez =

Spanish Catholic priest (1908–1994)

Venerable Tomás Morales Pérez S.J.
- Born: 30 October 1908; Macuto, Distrito Federal, Venezuela
- Died: 1 October 1994 (aged 85); Alcalá de Henares, Madrid, Spain
- Venerated in: Roman Catholic Church

Tomás Morales Pérez (30 October 1908 - 1 October 1994) was a Spanish Catholic priest and professed member from the Jesuits who founded the Institutos Seculares de los Cruzados de María.

Morales moved to Madrid as a child in 1909 where he studied law in Madrid at the college there and obtained his doctorate in Bologna at the college there. He entered the Jesuits in 1932 and was ordained a decade later in Granada before he began serving as a teacher in Badajoz.

He founded his secular institute for the purpose of engaging in a social apostolate and his strong Marian devotion led him to write on and promote the recitation of rosaries on a frequent basis. He had been known in life for his holiness and the cause for his beatification opened less than a decade after his death in 2000. He became titled as a Servant of God upon this point. He became titled as Venerable on 8 November 2017 after Pope Francis confirmed that the late priest had led a model life of heroic virtue.

== Life ==
Tomás Morales Pérez was born on 30 October 1908 in Macuto in Venezuela to Antonio and Josefa. He was baptized and confirmed in the Basilica of Santa Ana in Caracas on 18 April 1909 and one month later was taken to Madrid to live there.

He did his first studies at the Colegio Aleman in Madrid from 1914 until 1917. He made his First Communion in the Buen Suceso parish church in Madrid on 19 March 1917 while that September entered the Jesuit-run Nuestra Señora del Recuerdo college in Chamartín de la Rosa from 1917 until 1924. He did further studies in law at the college in Madrid and while there was active in several movements. He served as a member in the Asociación de Estudiantes Católicos and served also as its president. He was also the president for the Federación de Estudiantes Católicos de Madrid from 1928 until 1930 while also serving at some point as the spokesperson for the Junta Suprema de la Confederación de Estudiantes Católicos de España. In 1929 he began a relationship with a girl named Amparo but this ended in 1932 after he received a concrete call on 14 May to follow in the footsteps of Jesus Christ. In the Madrid college he was the first in his class for achieving excellent results. On 30 September 1930 he obtained his licentiate and then later obtained his doctorate in law on 30 June 1932 after a stint at the college in Bologna for about six months.

It was one month following this on 30 July 1932 that he entered the Jesuit novitiate in Chevetognè in Belgium with his formation lasting overall from 1932 until 1946; his novitiate and juniorate periods were done in Belgium from 1932 until 1936. Morales did his philosophical studies in Les Avins-en-Condroz in Belgium and in Avigliana from 1936 until 1939 while during that time his father Antonio died on 18 March 1938. He did his theological studies in Granada from 1939 until 1942. He was ordained to the priesthood on 13 May 1942 in Granada and celebrated his first Mass on 14 May.

Morales served as a professor for German and Italian in Badajoz from 1943 until 1945 and did his third probation period in the Jesuits from 1945 until 1946 in Gandia in Valencia and later at Salamanca. His mother Josefa died after this time in 1948. In 1961 he was sent to work in Badajoz and returned to Madrid in October 1963.

Morales founded the Hogar del Empleado in 1946 which was to act as an apostolic movement dedicated to social matters and to lead a social apostolate. He also founded the Cruzadas de Santa María in 1959 and the Pía Unión Cruzadas de Santa María in 1965. Morales fostered a particular devotion to the Blessed Mother and promoted the recitation of rosaries on a frequent basis since he wrote and said that such recitations were a fundamental aspect to an individual's spiritual life. Morales praised the example of Pope Pius VII who recited rosaries for sinners and after doing so "he obtained a conversion" due to it. He also pointed out how frequent recitation led to the victorious result in the Battle of Lepanto over the Ottoman Empire. Morales also pointed out the example of the conversion of the German aristocrat Baron John ab Eckersforff after John Ogilvie threw his rosary at his direction en route to his direction which landed on his chest. Morales wrote that it "does not leave us deaf to Christ" but makes people receptive to His will for them.

In Ávila on 7 April 1994 he suffered a fall which resulted in a fractured femur and required an operation. His health started declining from that point and he died on 1 October due to an hypothermia in Alcalá de Henares. His remains were relocated to his order's motherhouse on 5 November 2002.

== Beatification process ==
The beatification process took initial steps on 18 December 1999 after the forum for the diocesan process was transferred from Alcalá de Henares to Madrid. Morales became titled as a Servant of God after the Congregation for the Causes of Saints issued the "nihil obstat" (no objections) edict thus launching the cause. The Cardinal Archbishop of Madrid Antonio María Rouco Varela opened the diocesan process on 24 June 2000 and closed it later on 18 March 2007; the C.C.S. later validated this process in Rome on 17 October 2008 and received the Positio dossier from the postulation in 2013 for evaluation.

Theologians confirmed the cause at their meeting on 6 October 2016 while the cardinal and bishop members comprising the C.C.S. also provided a positive vote to the cause at their meeting on 17 October 2017. Morales became titled as Venerable on 8 November 2017 after Pope Francis confirmed that Morales had lived a life of heroic virtue.
