= Juan de Castillo (Jesuit) =

Spanish priest and missionary (1596–1628)

Saint Juan de Castillo S.J.
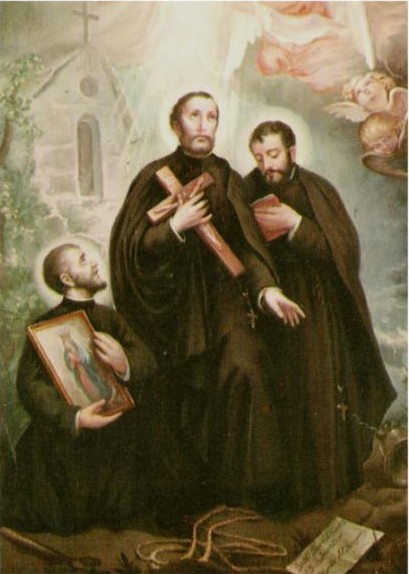
- Saints Juan de Castillo, Roque González, and Alfonso Rodríguez, Jesuit martyrs at Paraguay. Painting at Belmonte Collegiate, where Juan del Castillo was born.
- Born: 14 September 1596; Belmonte, Cuenca
- Died: 17 November 1628 (aged 32)
- Beatified: 28 January 1934
- Canonized: 16 May 1988 by John Paul II
- Major shrine: Caibaté
- Feast: 17 November
- Attributes: Martyr-saint

Juan de Castillo (14 September 1596 – 17 November 1628) was a Jesuit priest and missionary, and a martyr-saint of the Catholic Church. A Spaniard, he was one of the first to labor at the Jesuit reductions in Paraguay.

== Biography ==
Born on 14 September 1596 in Belmonte, in the region of Toledo in Spain, Juan del Castillo began studies for the legal profession at the University of Alcalá, but discovered, at the beginning of his career, a very different goal. He entered the Society of Jesus on 21 March 1614 in the novitiate in Madrid, in preparation for becoming a Jesuit priest.

In November 1616 he was sent with Alphonsus Rodriguez to South America. They arrived in Buenos Aires on February 15, 1617 and he went to Cordoba to continue his studies. He was ordained a priest in 1625.

=== Mission to Paraguay ===
==== Background ====
The Jesuits arrived at Asunción in 1588 and created the Jesuit reductions of Paraguay among the native Guaranis in 1609. At that time the Jesuit province of Paraguay did not correspond to the current borders. It included the current Paraguay, Uruguay, Argentina, a small part of Bolivia, and Brazil. Their purpose was to protect the natives from the Portuguese settlers, which quickly brought on hostility from these settlers.

==== Mission ====
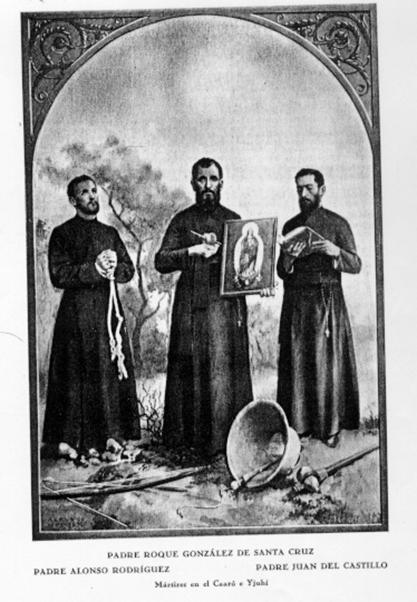

Juan del Castillo began his missionary work immediately after being ordained a priest. He joined at Ijuí Roque González y de Santa Cruz who left him at the head of this reduction and went to found a new one. At Ijuí, presently in the western Brazilian municipality of Rio Grande do Sul, Juan helped Christianize the Guaranis, and taught the youngest to read and write.

==== Death ====
Juan del Castillo was assassinated on 17 November 1628 in Yjuhi, two days after his companions Roque Gonzalez and Alphonsus Rodriguez. The chieftain Nheçu, head of the surrounding region, was hostile to their Christianizing efforts. He ordered his men to murder the three religious, and he condemned all missionaries in general. Juan was murdered in the forest, but brought back and buried with his companions in the reduction of the Immaculate Conception.

== Public recognition ==
Juan del Castillo along with Roque Gonzalez de Santa Cruz and Alfonso Rodriguez were beatified by Pope Pius XI in 1934. They were then together canonized on 16 May 1988 by John Paul II. The following is an excerpt from the homily of John Paul II during the canonization Mass in Asunción (Paraguay):

Tireless in preaching, austere in their personal lives, the love of Christ and the indigenous people led them to open new roads and raise reductions that facilitated the spread of the faith and ensured dignified living conditions for their brothers and sisters. ...The work of the Jesuit fathers enabled the Guarani peoples to pass, in a few years, from a state of semi-nomadic life to a singular civilization.

== Bibliography ==
- TYLENDA J. N., Jesuit Saints & Martyrs. Short Biographies of the Saints, Blessed, Venerables, and Servants of God of the Society of Jesus, 2nd éd., Chicago, Loyola Press, 1998.
- FATAS CABEZA G. (dir.), Gran enciclopedia de Espana, v. 5, Camino – Cataluna, Encyclopedia de Espana, S.A., 1992.
- STORNi H. S.I., Catalogo de los jesuitas de la provincia del Paraguay (Cuenca del plata) 1585 – 1768, Rome, Institutum Historicum S. I., 1980.
- TENENBAUM B. A. (dir.), Encyclopedia of Latin american History and Culture, v. 4 (Mestizo to Rutineros), Charles Scribner's Sons, 1996.
- GERHARDS A., Dictionnaire historique des ordres religieux, Fayard, 1998.
- BANGERT William V. S.J., A History of the Society of Jesus, St Louis, the Institute of jesuit sources, 1972.
