= Virginia Blanco Tardío =

Venerable Virginia Blanco Tardío
- Born: 18 April 1916; Cochabamba, Bolivia
- Died: 23 July 1990 (aged 74); Cochabamba, Bolivia

Virginia Blanco Tardío (18 April 1916 – 23 July 1990) was a Bolivian Roman Catholic from Cochabamba and served as a member of Catholic Action. She was a well-known catechist and educator in addition to opening a range of different places to cater to the needs of the poor. Blanco was also awarded the Pro Ecclesia et Pontifice award in 1975 after Pope Paul VI acknowledged her work with the Catholic Action movement.

Blanco's beatification cause has commenced and under Pope John Paul II on 23 October 2000 became known as a Servant of God. She was proclaimed to be venerable in 2015 after Pope Francis recognized her life of heroic virtue.

== Life ==
Virginia Blanco Tardío was born on 18 April 1916 in Cochabamba as the second of four daughters of Luis Pio Blanco Unzueta (d. 1934) and Daria Tardío Quiroga; her parents married in 1906. Her siblings were: Maria Luisa Blanco Tardío, Alicia Blanco Tardío and Maria Teresa Sarabia.

Blanco thought about becoming a nun but decided against it due to the demanding life it would entail as well as her health. This thought came about around the time of her father's death when she was eighteen. She earned her high school degree in the humanities at the College of the Handmaids of the Sacred Heart of Jesus which she remained tied to as a member of the Marian Congregation of Alumnae. Blanco was studious and was known for her extensive culture – she possessed vast knowledge in biblical and theological matter and went on to become a reputable teacher and catechist. She educated the children of farm workers. She earned the title of Professor of Religion at the age of 32; she taught religion in several public schools for a total of four decades while for a decade worked as an unpaid volunteer.

In 1932 she joined the Catholic Action. Blanco would serve as the President of the Women's Youth of the Catholic Action from 1941 until 1961 when she was made the Diocesan President of Association of Women of Catholic Action which she held until her death. Blanco founded an "Economic Kitchen" in 1954 for the poor and also established the "Prayer and Friendship Group" in 1962 — the group's counsel was the Jesuit priest Julián Sayos. She founded a center that was to provide medical services to those who could not afford healthcare. In addition she also aided children in their preparation for the sacraments and on more than one occasion baptized children that were in danger of death.

Blanco met Pope Pius XII in 1950 in Rome who dubbed her the "Apostle of Catholic Action" and encouraged her work. She received the Pro Ecclesia et Pontifice award in December 1965 after Pope Paul VI recognized her significant contribution to evangelism and her work with the Catholic Action movement. On 8 December 1977 she founded the "Comedores Sociales" – now a part of "Policlinico Rosario" — which opened to serve the needs of the poor; following her death her sister Maria Teresa Sarabia continued this work. She received the Eucharist from Pope John Paul II at a Mass during his apostolic visit to the nation on 11 May 1988.

Blanco's sight began to fail towards the end of the 1980s and she died due to cardiac arrest in the night of 23 July 1990; she had made her final confession and received her last Communion on 22 July.

== Beatification process ==
The Pro Ecclesia et Pontifice award - she received hers in 1975.

The beatification process commenced on 23 October 2000 under Pope John Paul II when the Congregation for the Causes of Saints declared the nihil obstat ("nothing against") to the cause and granted the title of Servant of God upon her. The diocesan process commenced on 31 January 2001 - in which the Archbishop of Cochabamba, Tito Solari Capellari inaugurated – and closed on 16 February 2005. Miguel Manzanera served as the Chief Judge and oversaw the examination of 45 witnesses who knew Blanco. The Congregation validated this process in Rome on 19 January 2007.

The postulation submitted the positio to the Congregation in 2013 for further investigation into the cause while theologians voiced their approval to the contents of the positio in a meeting on 5 June 2014. The Congregation did likewise in 2014 before passing it to the pope for his final approval. Pope Francis proclaimed Blanco to be venerable on 22 January 2015 after confirming that she had indeed lived a model life of heroic virtue. The process for a miracle attributed to her intercession was investigated from 10 March 2016 until 3 June 2016. The postulator that is assigned to the cause is Anton Witwer SJ. The first and previous postulator was Salvador Sanchis.
