= Saturnina Rodríguez de Zavalía =

Argentine Roman Catholic professed religious

Blessed Saturnina Rodríguez de Zavalía
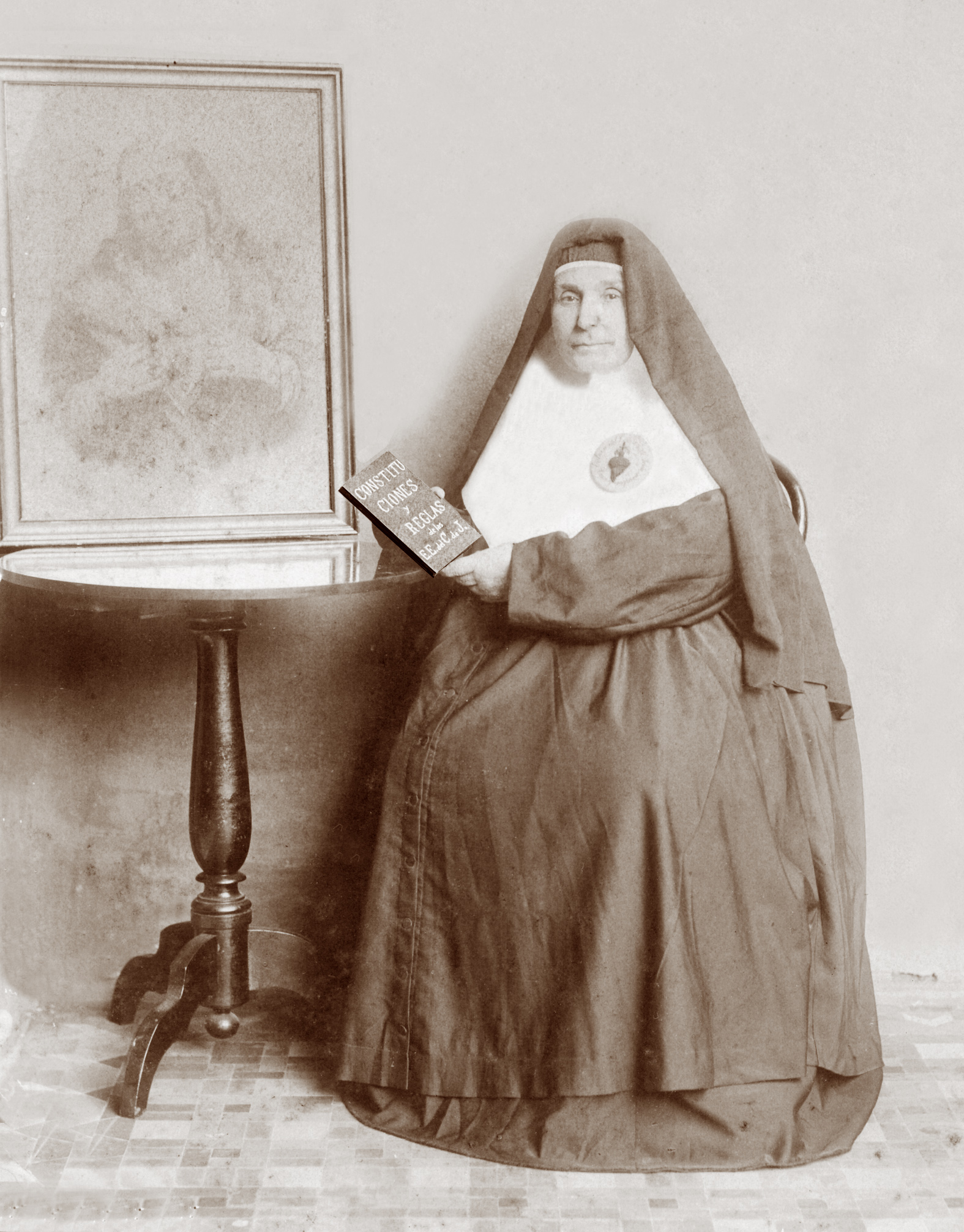

Religious
- Born: 27 November 1823; Córdoba, Argentina
- Died: 5 April 1896 (aged 72); Córdoba, Argentina
- Venerated in: Roman Catholic Church
- Beatified: 25 November 2017, Córdoba, Argentina by Cardinal Angelo Amato
- Feast: 27 November
- Attributes: Religious habit
- Patronage: Handmaids of the Heart of Jesus

Saturnina Rodríguez de Zavalía (27 November 1823 – 5 April 1896), also known by her religious name Catalina de María, was an Argentine Roman Catholic professed religious and the founder of the Handmaids of the Heart of Jesus. Zavalía was married for just over a decade before she followed her religious calling and founded an order that spread across Argentina; she collaborated with José Gabriel del Rosario Brochero before her death.

The canonization cause started on 1 September 1941 and Pope John Paul II later titled her as Venerable on 18 December 1997. Zavalía was beatified on 25 November 2017 at a Mass celebrated in Córdoba with Cardinal Angelo Amato presiding over it.

== Life ==
Saturnina Rodríguez de Zavalía was born in Córdoba on 27 November 1823 as the third of four children to Hilario Rodríguez Orduña (1791–1832) and Catalina Montenegro (1803–26); her baptism was celebrated on 27 November in the town cathedral. Her two elder sisters were Manuela and Petrona and in 1826 her sister Estaurófila was born. Her mother died in 1826 – after the birth of the final child – and her father died in 1832 after having refused to wed again after being widowed. Her paternal aunt Doña Teresa (b. 1766) assumed care for the children after her father died.

Her first call to the religious life came in 1840 after she took a course in the Spiritual Exercises alongside the Jesuits. In 1848 she chose the priest Tiburcio López as her spiritual director and it was he who encouraged her to wed. Rodríguez married Manuel Antonio de Zavalía on 13 August 1852 – he was widowed with two children Benito and Deidamia – and he threatened to commit suicide if she refused to wed him; López officiated at this wedding. The couple had one daughter who died either straight after birth or in a miscarriage and it endangered her health. Her marriage was not peaceful at times due to her outburst of anger when she was under pressure which sometimes became violent outbursts. The four moved to Paraná in 1860 and returned to Córdoba in 1861. Her husband succumbed to illness on 30 March 1865.

On 15 September 1865 the widowed Zavalía visited the local church to reflect before the Blessed Sacrament and she decided to establish a religious congregation; she founded the Handmaids of the Heart of Jesus on 29 September 1872. Her spiritual director at that time was Father David Luque and she set up the order's motherhouse on 1 March 1875. Houses were set up during this period including one in 1886 at Santiago del Estero and in 1889 in Tucumán. She once collaborated with José Gabriel del Rosario Brochero. Luque suffered ill health since 1888 and he died on 11 August 1892 which prompted her to have him interred in the order's motherhouse. In 1893, León Federico Aneiros, the Archbishop of Buenos Aires asked her to establish a house in Buenos Aires, which she did.

Zavalía died due to illness on 5 April 1896 at 8:00am after having experienced ill health during the Easter season.

== Beatification process ==
The beatification process opened under Pope Pius XII on 1 September 1941 and she became titled as a Servant of God while that same 1 September the informative process launched in Córdoba under Archbishop Fermín Emilio Lafitte and closed at some unspecified time; the Congregation for the Causes of Saints validated this process in Rome on 7 April 1989 and received the Positio dossier from the postulation in 1990. Historians approved the cause on 12 December 1995 as did the theologians on 25 January 1997; the C.C.S. granted their approval on 7 October 1997. Pope John Paul II titled her as Venerable on 18 December 1997 after confirming her life of heroic virtue.

The process for a miracle opened in Tucumán on 16 August 2012 and closed on 27 November 2012 while the C.C.S. validated this process in Rome on 25 October 2013. A medical board of seven experts issued their approval to the cause on 17 July 2016 while six theologians issued a unanimous approval to this healing on 19 January 2017. The members of the C.C.S. met on 25 April 2017 and granted their approval to the miracle which shall now be passed to the pope for his final approval in order for the beatification to take place. Pope Francis approved this miraculous healing on 4 May 2017 and thus approved her beatification; Cardinal Angelo Amato celebrated the beatification in her native Argentina on 25 November 2017.

The current postulator for the cause is Dr. Silvia Mónica Correale.
