= Camila Rolón =

Argentinian nun

Venerable Camila Rolón
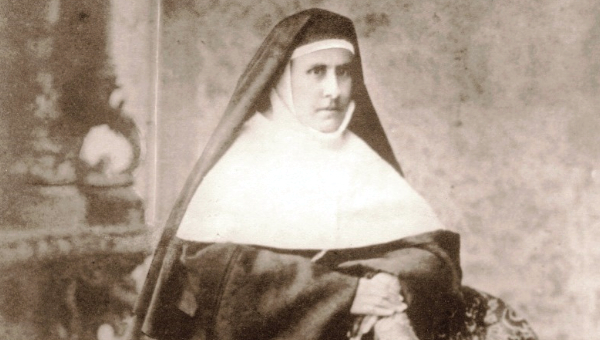
- Born: 18 July 1842; San Isidro, Buenos Aires, Argentina
- Died: 16 February 1913 (aged 70); Rome, Kingdom of Italy

Camila Rolón (religious name Camila of Saint Joseph, 18 July 1842 – 16 February 1913) was an Argentine religious sister and the founder of the Poor Sisters of Saint Joseph.

Rolón survived a cholera outbreak in Buenos Aires in the 1870s that claimed her mother and brother and after this made attempts to enter either the Capuchin Poor Clares or the Carmelites. In 1880, she moved to Mercedes where she founded an orphanage that would later evolve into a religious congregation. This congregation spread to the point that the motherhouse relocated to Rome as did she and it was there that she died.

Her beatification process opened in 1950 despite the fact that the cause was not introduced on a formal level until 1975. In 1993, she became titled as venerable after Pope John Paul II confirmed that Rolón had practiced heroic virtue during her life.

== Life ==
Camila Rolón was born in San Isidro on 18 July 1842 to Eusebio Rolón and María Gutíerrez; her baptism was celebrated on 22 July and she was baptized "Corina Camila". Her parents took Camillus de Lellis as her patron saint. Rolón received the sacrament of confirmation when she was seven from Bishop Mariano Escalada and had her First Communion in 1854.

In 1867, a cholera epidemic broke out in Buenos Aires and after it disappeared the Yellow Fever spread throughout the region. This new outbreak claimed the life of her mother in 1870 while her brother Andrés died not long following this.

From the age of eighteen Rolón had felt a strong call to the religious life and wanted to join the Capuchin Poor Clares in Buenos Aires. Rolón tried entering in 1886 but failed. This came after a previous and failed attempt to join the Discalced Carmelites. Rolón entered on 21 April 1875 and assumed the religious name Dolores de San José, but ill health forced her to leave the convent on 20 May to spend five months recuperating at her home. Her father died not long after this in mid-1877.

On 28 January 1880, Rolón moved out of her father's home alongside two friends and eleven orphaned girls to Mercedes in order to found an orphanage in an old house. A benefactor, Leon Gallardo, heard about her venture and so promised that he would establish a building to serve as the "motherhouse" of a new congregation, the Poor Sisters of Saint Joseph, which were established in 1889 in Muñiz. Rolón established 32 houses and two novitiate houses.

On 19 March 1881, she and three others assumed the religious habit and Rolón made her first vows on 19 March 1882. She arrived in Rome on 7 May 1891 alongside two companions on a mission to obtain papal approval for her institute. It was there she spoke with Cardinal Mariano Rampolla who approved of her idea and assured her that he would do whatever he could to get the pope to approve it. The cardinal also managed to secure her and her companions a private audience with Pope Leo XIII. Rolón threw herself at the pope's feet which she kissed and the pope promised her that he would issue the papal decree of praise for the congregation.

Her return to Buenos Aires on 26 July 1891 saw her continue with the congregation. On 19 March 1892, Rolón made her perpetual vows. Rolón served as the congregation's first Superior General and was re-elected as such on 19 March 1896. She later undertook another trip to Rome on 31 March 1903 and would return to Buenos Aires that July around the time that Pope Leo XIII died. Papal approval for the congregation was given before the pope's death on 3 May 1898. Rolón returned to Rome on 30 November 1904 to meet with Pope Pius X in a private audience while later on 19 March 1908 was re-elected once more as Superior General before making a return trip to Rome in late 1908. The nun made another trip to Rome on 27 September 1910 and arrived there in late October.

The constitutions for the Poor Sisters of Saint Joseph received approval from Pope Pius X on 15 December 1908 and Rolón travelled to Rome. In 1910, the congregation's motherhouse was established in Rome where Rólon relocated.

In late 1911, she became ill and so was confined to her bed but it was later diagnosed as a carcinoma of the uterus (evolving into uterine cancer) that had first manifested in 1875 and was the reason for her departure from the Carmelites. Rolón rallied from this but her cancer returned sometime in 1912 forcing her to sign her spiritual testament on 27 September 1912 in preparation for her death. Her condition worsened on 10 October 1912 and she remained in bed for treatment though would move to an armchair when she had enough strength to move about. Rolón died at 12:20 am. Her remains arrived in Buenos Aires on 22 March to the metropolitan cathedral and then were taken to Muñiz for interment.

The congregation of the Poor Sisters of Saint Joseph exists in countries such as Romania and Madagascar and in 2008 had 161 religious in 30 houses.

== Beatification process ==
The beatification process for Rolón opened in both Rome and the La Plata diocese in an informative process that opened on 2 August 1950 and concluded later on 20 March 1952. Beginning on 21 June 1952, her spiritual writings were also collected as part of the investigation for theologians to examine; their aim was to discern whether her writings adhered to doctrine or not and a decree issued on 28 January 1959 confirmed her writings were approved. The formal introduction to the cause came under Pope Paul VI on 13 March 1975 while an apostolic process was later held from 8 June 1977 until 31 July 1978. The Congregation for the Causes of Saints later validated these processes in Rome on 13 November 1981 as having adhered to their regulations for causes. Rolón was declared to be venerable on 2 April 1993 after Pope John Paul II confirmed that Sr. Camila of Saint Joseph lived a life of heroic virtue. Her beatification depends upon papal confirmation of a miracle that is often a healing that science and medicine fail to explain. The diocese that one such healing originated in investigated the case and the process for this concluded on 5 August 2016. Cardinal Giovanni Angelo Becciu sent a letter to Bishop Santiago Olivera in 2019 stating that two medical experts had to meet to assess if the case was credible before sending it to the medical board for evaluation. The postulator for the cause is Silvia Mónica Correale.
