= María Angélica Pérez =

Argentinian nun (1897–1932)

Blessed María Angélica Pérez
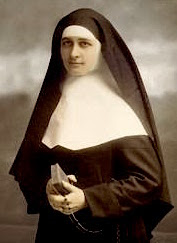

Virgin
- Born: 17 August 1897; San Martin, Argentina
- Died: 20 May 1932 (aged 34); Vallenar, Atacama, Chile
- Venerated in: Roman Catholic Church
- Beatified: 17 November 2012, Pergamino, Buenos Aires, Argentina by Cardinal Angelo Amato
- Feast: 20 May

María Angélica Pérez (religious name María Crescentia, 17 August 1897 – 20 May 1932) was an Argentine religious sister of the Daughters of Our Lady of the Garden. She also was known to ill people as "Sister sweetness".

She was beatified on 17 November 2012 in Buenos Aires.

== Life ==
María Angélica Pérez was born on 17 August 1897 in Buenos Aires to Spanish immigrants Augustín Pérez and Ema Rodriguez as the fifth of eleven children. Among all her siblings there were four brothers and two sisters. She was raised on a farm and helped her father with work around the farm. She was a pious child, known for her devotion to the faith. Four siblings before her – who died in childhood – were born while living in Uruguay.

Pérez entered the congregation of the Daughters of Our Lady of the Gardenon 31 December 1915 and received the habit on 2 September 1916; she assumed religious name María Crescentia. On 7 September 1918 she made her vows. She served as both a teacher and a catechist to children and from 1924 to 1928 worked in a hospital tending to patients afflicted with tuberculosis and also sick children.

She was sent to Mar del Plata in 1925 to care for the ill and was infected with lung disease and so arrangements were moved for her to be transferred to a change of environment. As her health declined she was assigned to a hospital in Vallenar in Chile in 1928 and was perceived as a source of happiness and comfort to the patients. Pérez died in 1932 in hospital. In 1966, her relics were found to be incorrupt upon inspection and were taken to Quillata. She was reinterred in the college chapel in Huerto de Pergamino in her homeland of Argentina on 26 July 1986.

== Beatification ==
The beatification process commenced in a diocesan process on 30 June 1987 in which those involved were required to investigate Pérez's life and her personal holiness. The process also saw the accumulation of documentation pertaining to her life and later closed on 3 October 1989. This process took place despite the fact that the Congregation for the Causes of Saints did not grant their formal approval to the initiation of the cause until 5 December 1989 - this conferred upon her the title of Servant of God.

The process was deemed to have completed its work according to the set criteria in 1993 which allowed for the Congregation for the Causes of Saints to begin their own line of investigation into the cause. The postulation submitted the positio to Rome in 1997. On 22 June 2004 she was proclaimed to be venerable after Pope John Paul II acknowledged the fact that Pérez had lived a life of heroic virtue.

A miracle due to her intercession was investigated in the diocese of its origin from 25 August 1999 until 20 April 2000; it received the validation of Roman officials on 16 November 2001 and could thus proceed to the following stages of investigation. On 19 December 2011 Pope Benedict XVI approved the 1995 healing of María Sara Pane from Hepatitis-A.

Pérez' beatification was celebrated in Buenos Aires on 17 November 2012 and Cardinal Angelo Amato presided over it on the behalf of Benedict XVI. The postulator of the cause is Enrico Venanzi.
