= In articulo mortis =

The Latin locution in articulo mortis means "at the point of death", "at a critical moment or point" and, properly, "in the instant of death".

The phrase is taken from the ecclesiastical phrasebook and is used to indicate the actions carried out by a person when his life is in danger, i.e. on his deathbed, therefore with their exceptionality, irrefutability and non-postponability. In the legal field, the expression indicates the no longer refutable words said by a person shortly before dying.

== Plenary indulgence ==
The plenary indulgence in articulo mortis has very ancient origins. The indulgence was granted with the Extreme Unction or the blessing of a presbyter, bishop or Supreme Pontiff, provided that the faithful were in a state of grace that had fulfilled to the prescribed works, such as frequently reciting a specific prayer or having mentioned the name of Jesus and Mary at the point of death with contrite heart.
