= María Guggiari Echeverría =

Paraguayan Discalced Carmelite

Blessed María Guggiari Echeverría OCD
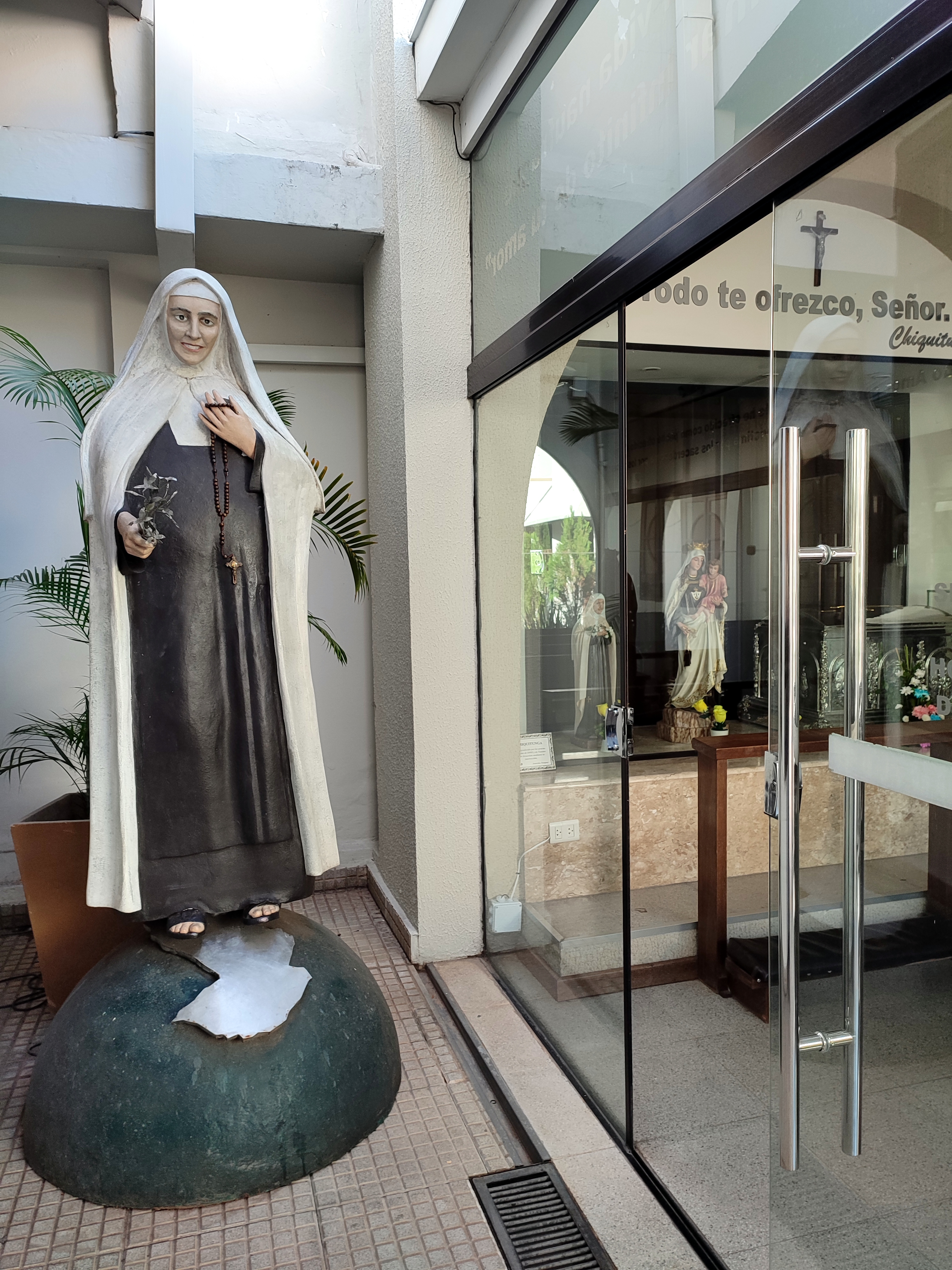
- Statue of Blessed María Guggiari in a Carmel chapel in Asunción, Paraguay

Virgin
- Born: 12 January 1925; Villarica del Espiritu Santo, Guairá, Paraguay
- Died: 28 April 1959 (aged 34); Asunción, Paraguay
- Venerated in: Roman Catholic Church
- Beatified: 23 June 2018, Estadio General Pablo Rojas, Asunción, Paraguay by Cardinal Angelo Amato
- Feast: 28 April
- Patronage: Paraguayan youth

María Guggiari Echeverría, OCD (María Felicia de Jesús Sacramentado in religion; 12 January 1925 – 28 April 1959), was a Paraguayan Discalced Carmelite who served in her adolescence as a member of Catholic Action.

Guggiari Echeverría's cause for sainthood commenced under Pope John Paul II in 1997 after she received the title Servant of God, and the confirmation of her heroic virtue led to Pope Benedict XVI declaring her venerable on 27 March 2010. Pope Francis confirmed her beatification and it was celebrated on 23 June 2018.

== Life ==
María Guggiari Echeverría was born in 1925 in the Guairá Department as the first of seven children to Ramón Guggiari and María Arminda Echeverría. Her father often called her "Chiquitunga". Her siblings included her brother Federico Augusto Ramón Guggiari Echeverría and sisters María Teresa Arminda and Mañica González Raveti; there were four others.

She was baptized on 28 February 1929 and received her First Communion on 8 December 1937. In 1941 she became a member of the Catholic Action movement – despite her parents' opposition to it – and she dedicated herself to the movement and the care of the poor and those who suffered while also serving as a catechist for children. She met her spiritual director Father Julio Cesar Duarte Ortella in February 1941. It was during her time with the movement that she met and fell in love with the medical student Saua Angel and she began to wonder if God wanted her to wed like the parents of Thérèse of Lisieux, who made vows to remain chaste in the married life. Echeverría waited for the Lord's will to manifest itself, and Angel later told her in May 1951 that he felt called to the priesthood. She decided to offer whatever assistance he needed and helped Angel hide it from his father, a Muslim. She bid farewell to Angel who departed for Madrid for further studies and to continue to discern his vocation. She made a vow to remain chaste in October 1942. In 1947 – due to civil unrest – her father and brother Federico were sent to Posadas in Argentina for a brief period of time.

Angel departed for Europe in April 1952 and then made the decision to become a priest in November 1952, in a move that also prompted her to discern her call to the religious life (she had visited a convent of the Carmelites on 20 August 1952), though in 1953 she received opposition to this from her parents. In January 1954 she began a period of spiritual exercises. Despite this opposition she entered the Discalced Carmelite Order on 2 February 1955 and received the habit on 14 August 1955. She took her initial vows on 15 August 1956 along with her new religious name. She wrote around 48 letters to the now-Father Angel in her time as a religious.

On 7 January 1959 she became ill with infectious hepatitis and was forced to move into a sanatorium to recover; she spat blood for the first time on 28 March 1959 – Holy Saturday. On 28 April 1959 in Asunción she was with her siblings and parents on cushions and sat up and spoke her final words at 4:10 am: "Jesus I love you! What a sweet encounter! Virgin Mary!" She had asked the prioress to read a poem of Teresa of Ávila before she died. Her remains were relocated on 28 April 1993.

== Beatification ==
The beatification process was set to commence after she became titled as a Servant of God under Pope John Paul II on 17 July 1997 after the Congregation for the Causes of Saints granted the official "nihil obstat" ('nothing against') to the cause, while the diocesan process spanned from 13 December 1997 until 28 April 2000. The C.C.S. validated this process on 22 February 2002 and allowed for the postulation to compile and submit the Positio dossier to officials in Rome in 2004 for further assessment.

Theologians met to approve the cause on 20 March 2009 while the cardinal and bishop members of the C.C.S. met and approved the cause in a similar fashion on 8 February 2010. On 27 March 2010 she was titled as Venerable after Pope Benedict XVI confirmed her life of heroic virtue.

The process for investigating a miracle spanned from 23 March 2005 until 27 April 2007 and received C.C.S. validation on 14 November 2008. Her miracle involved the healing of a newborn, Ángel Ramón, who showed no vital signs at birth but recuperated after 20 minutes, following the prayers by the obstetrician for the intercession of María Guggiari Echeverría. Medical experts in Rome approved the miracle presented to them in their meeting on 1 June 2017. Theologians approved the case on 30 November 2017 as did the C.C.S. members on 6 March 2018. Pope Francis approved this miracle just hours later and confirmed her beatification; she was beatified at the Estadio General Pablo Rojas on 23 June 2018 with Cardinal Angelo Amato presiding on the pope's behalf.

The postulator assigned to the cause was Romano Gambalunga.
