= Roque González y de Santa Cruz =

Paraguayan missionary

Saint Roque González de Santa Cruz SJ
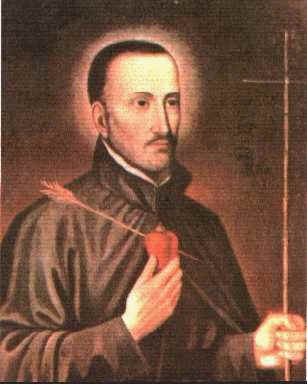

Martyr
- Born: 17 November 1576; Asunción, Governorate of the Río de la Plata, Viceroyalty of Peru, Spanish Empire
- Died: 15 November 1628 (aged 51); Mission of Todos los Santos de Caaró, Captaincy of Rio Grande do Sul, State of Brazil, Portuguese Empire
- Venerated in: Roman Catholic Church
- Beatified: 28 January 1934 by Pope Pius XI
- Canonized: 16 May 1988 by Pope John Paul II
- Feast: 16 November

Roque González de Santa Cruz, SJ (17 November 1576 – 15 November 1628) was a Guaraní-Spanish Jesuit priest who was the first missionary among the Guaraní in Paraguay. He was murdered in 1628 and is venerated as a martyr and a saint by the Catholic Church.

== Biography ==
González was born in the city of Asunción, then part of the Governorate of New Andalusia, on 17 November 1576. He was the son of a Spanish conquistador named Bartolomé González de Villaverde and Asuncion-born María de Santa Cruz, daughter of the Spaniard Juan de Santa Cruz and a Guarani woman. Both his father and grandfather arrived in South America in the fleet led by Pedro de Mendoza. Due to the large native population in the region, he spoke Guaraní fluently from an early age, as well as his native Spanish.

In 1598, at the age of 23, González was ordained a priest by Bishop Fernando Trexo y Senabria of Córdoba, to serve that diocese. In 1609 he became a member of the Society of Jesus, beginning his work as a missionary in what is now Brazil. He became the first European person to enter the region known today as the State of Rio Grande do Sul, extending the system of Jesuit reductions begun in Paraguay to that region.

González' arrival in the area happened only after his developing delicate relationships of trust with local indigenous leaders, some of whom feared that the priests were preparing the way for the arrival of masses of Spanish colonists in their land.

In 1613 González led the founding of the Reduction of San Ignacio Miní. In 1615 he founded Itapúa, which is now the City of Posadas in the Argentine Province of Misiones. Then he had to move the reduction to the other side of the river, now the site of the City of Encarnación. He also founded the reductions of Concepción de la Sierra Candelaria (1619), Candelaria (1627), San Javier, Yapeyú (now in the Province of Corrientes), San Nicolás, Asunción del Ijuí, and Caaró (now in Brazil). In the region of Iyuí, he had difficulties with the local chieftain and sorcerer (cacique) Nheçu (written Ñezú in Spanish), who opposed the missions.

On 15 November 1628, while preparing to oversee the installation of a new bell for the church at the Mission of Todos los Santos de Caaró, González was struck down and killed with a tomahawk, along with his fellow Jesuit, Juan del Castillo, upon the orders of Nheçu. After their deaths, their bodies were dragged into the church, which was set ablaze. Two days later, their colleague Alonso Rodríguez y Olmedo was also murdered by followers of Nheçu.

== Veneration ==
González was beatified by Pope Pius XI on 28 January 1934. He and his companions were later canonized by Pope John Paul II in Asunción, thus becoming the first native of Paraguay to be declared a saint by the Catholic Church.

González has been named the patron saint of the cities of Posadas, Argentina, and Encarnación, Paraguay. Liturgically he is commemorated on 16 November, along with the other "Martyrs of the Rio de la Plata".

== Bibliography ==
- Ghezzi, Bert. "St. Roque González, SJ (1576-1628)", Voices of the Saints, ISBN 978-0-8294-2806-3
- Clement J. McNaspy, S.J.: Conquistador without Sword. The Life of Roque González, S.J., Chicago, Loyola University Press, 1984, 206pp.
- 'Os Olhos do Pe. Roque' or 'Father Roque's Eyes' (in Portuguese)
