= Alphonsus Rodriguez =

Spanish Jesuit religious brother and saint

Saint Alphonsus Rodríguez SJ
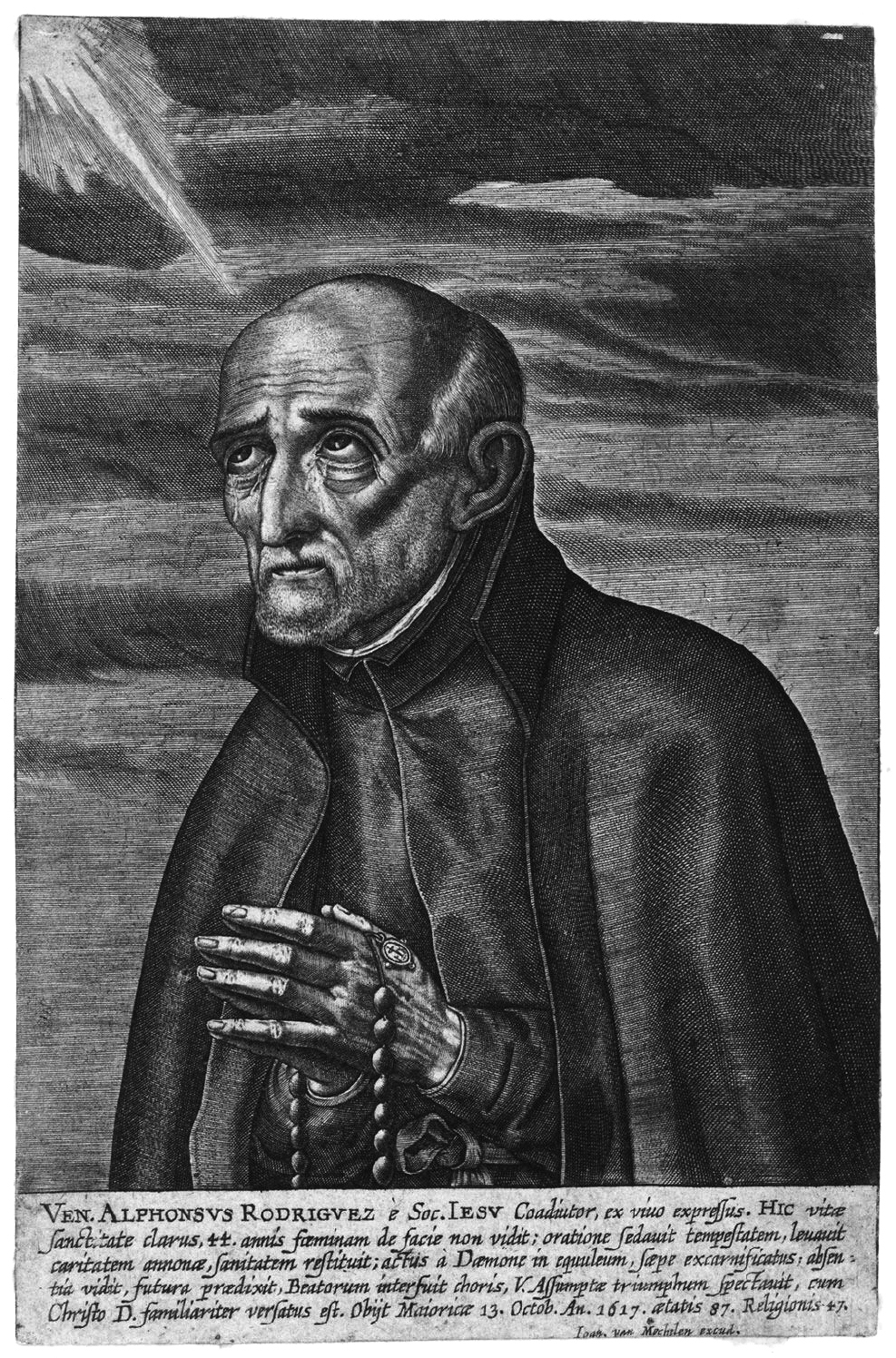
- Born: 25 July 1532; Segovia, Spain
- Died: 31 October 1617 (aged 85); Palma de Mallorca, Spain
- Venerated in: Catholic Church (Society of Jesus)
- Beatified: 5 June 1825 by Pope Leo XII
- Canonized: 15 January 1888 by Pope Leo XIII
- Major shrine: Jesuit College; Palma de Mallorca, Spain
- Feast: October 30

Alphonsus Rodríguez SJ (Spanish: Alfonso; 25 July 1532 – 31 October 1617) was a Spanish Jesuit religious brother who is venerated as a saint in the Catholic Church.

== Life and work ==
Rodríguez was the son of a wool merchant. When Peter Faber, one of the original Jesuits, visited the city to preach, the Rodríguez family provided hospitality to the Jesuit. Faber prepared the young Rodríguez for his First Communion.

At the age of twelve, Rodríguez was sent to the new Jesuit college at Alcalá, but left two years later to help his mother run the family business when his father died. At the age of 26, he married María Suarez, a woman of his own station, with whom he had three children. At the age of 31, she had died as did two of their children. From then on, Rodriguez began a life of prayer and mortification, separated from the world around him. On the death of his third child, his thoughts turned to life in some religious order.

Previous associations had brought him into contact with the first Jesuits who had come to Spain, Peter Faber among others, but it was apparently impossible to carry out his purpose of entering the Society as he was without education, having only an incomplete year at a new college begun at Alcalá by Francis Villanueva. At the age of 39 he attempted to make up this deficiency by following the course at the College of Barcelona, but without success. His austerities had also undermined his health. After considerable delay he was finally admitted into the Society of Jesus as a lay brother on 31 January 1571, at the age of 40. The provincial is supposed to have said that if Alphonsus was not qualified to become a brother or a priest, he could enter to become a saint.

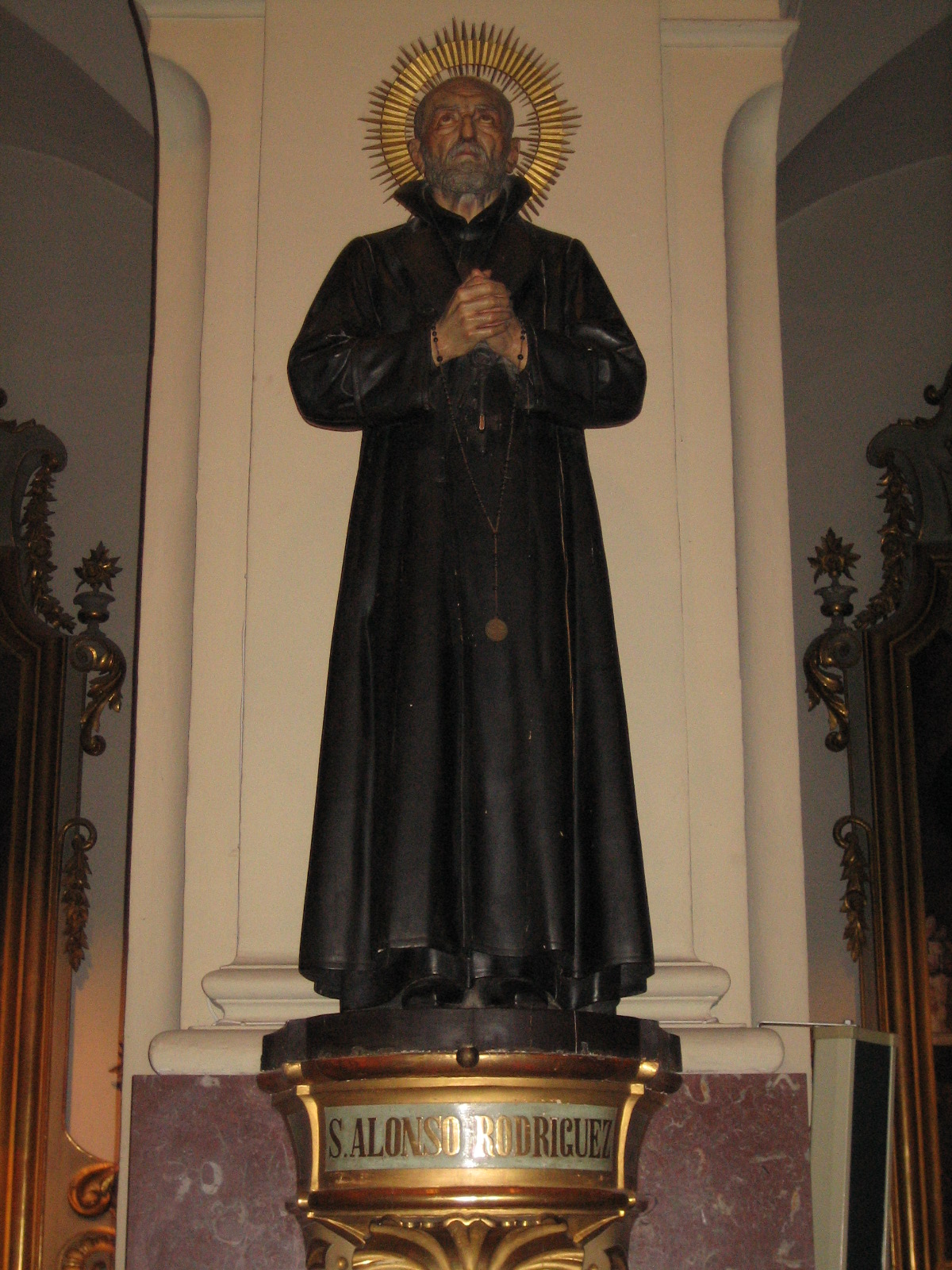
Statue of St. Alphonsus Rodriguez in the church of Mount Sion, Palma de Mallorca, Balearic Islands

Distinct novitiates for seminarians and lay brothers had not yet been established in Spain, and Rodríguez began his term of probation at Valencia or Gandia—this point is a subject of dispute—and after six months was sent to the recently founded college on Mallorca, where he remained in the humble position of porter for 46 years, exercising a marvelous influence not only on the members of the household, but upon a great number of people who came to the porter's lodge for advice and direction. As doorkeeper, his duties were to receive visitors who came to the college; search out the fathers or students who were wanted in the parlor; deliver messages; run errands; console the sick at heart who, having no one to turn to, came to him; give advice to the troubled; and distribute alms to the needy. Alphonsus tells that each time the bell rang, he looked at the door and envisioned that it was God who was standing outside seeking admittance. Among the distinguished Jesuits who came under his influence was Peter Claver, who lived with him for some time at Mallorca, and who followed his advice in asking for the missions of South America. He made his perpetual vows in 1585 at the age of 54.

The bodily mortifications which he imposed on himself were extreme, the scruples and mental agitation to which he was subject were of frequent occurrence, his obedience absolute, and his absorption in spiritual things, even when engaged on most distracting employments, continual. His Jesuit superiors, seeing the good work he was doing among the townspeople, were eager to have his influence spread far among his own religious community, so on feast days they often let him into the pulpit of the refectory to have him give a sermon. On more than one occasion, the community sat quietly past dinner to hear Rodríguez finish preaching.

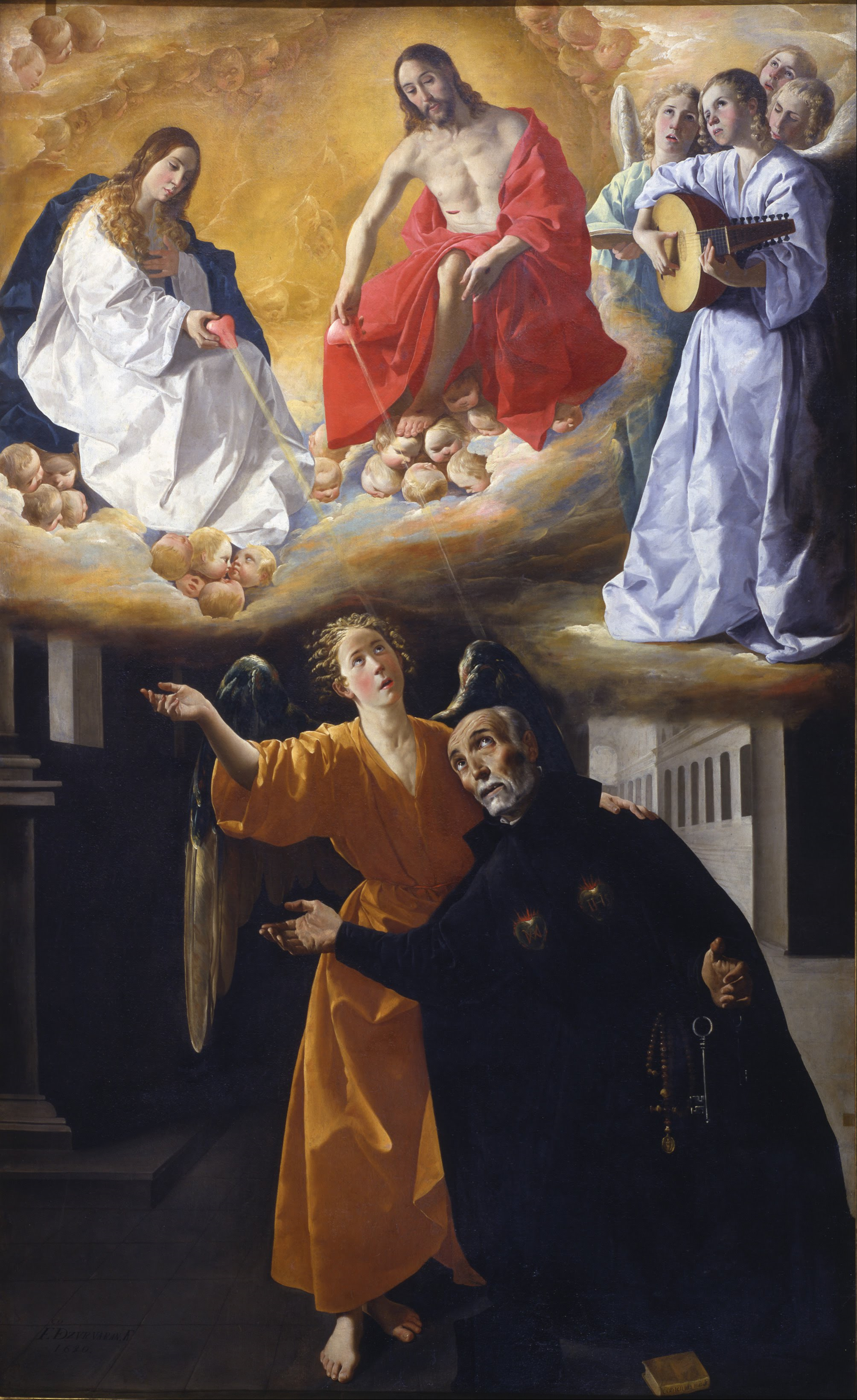
The Vision of Saint Alphonsus Rodriguez by Francisco de Zurbarán.

Rodriguez held deep devotion to the Sacred Heart and to the Blessed Virgin Mary, especially to the latter's Immaculate Conception. He would produce copies of the complete text of the Little Office of the Blessed Virgin Mary for the private recitation of people who asked. He reportedly was favored with mystical graces, ecstasies and visions of our Lord, our Lady and the saints.

Rodríguez became very feeble when he reached his eighties and in his last months his memory began to fail. He was not even able to remember his favourite prayers. He died on 31 October 1617.

He left a considerable number of manuscripts, some of which have been published as Obras Espirituales del B. Alonso Rodríguez (Barcelona, 1885, 3 vols., octavo, complete edition, 8 vols. in quarto). They are sometimes only reminiscences of domestic exhortations, the texts are often repeated, the illustrations are from everyday life, and the treatment of one virtue occasionally entrenches upon another. They were not written with a view to publication, but put down by Rodríguez himself, or dictated to others, in obedience to a positive command of his superiors.

== Veneration ==
Alphonsus Rodriguez was declared venerable in 1626. In 1633, he was chosen by the Council General of Mallorca as one of the special patrons of the city and island.

In 1760, Pope Clement XIII decreed that "the virtues of the Venerable Alonso were proved to be of a heroic degree", but the expulsion of the Society from Spain in 1773, and its suppression, delayed his beatification until 5 June 1825. His canonization took place on 15 January 1888. His remains are enshrined in Mallorca.

== Legacy ==
Although his life was punctuated with personal tragedies and disappointments, he had a decided influence on the people he met. He served with such love that the act of opening the door became for him a sacramental gesture. Pope Francis made reference to him in a list of Jesuit priests associated with devotion to the Sacred Heart in his 2024 encyclical letter on this subject, Dilexit nos. (Note: Note that Pope Francis refers to Rodriguez as a priest in this text, but other sources refer to him as a lay brother.)

There is a municipalité of Saint-Alphonse-Rodriguez in Québec, Canada, and a parish dedicated to Saint Alphonsus Rodriguez in Woodstock, Maryland.

Rodríguez is the subject of a sonnet by fellow-Jesuit Gerard Manley Hopkins, In honour of St. Alphonsus Rodriguez.

== See also ==
- Saint Alphonsus Rodriguez, patron saint archive

== Bibliography ==
- Holweck, F. G., A Biographical Dictionary of the Saints. St. Louis, MO: B. Herder Book Co., 1924.
