= Lists of saints =

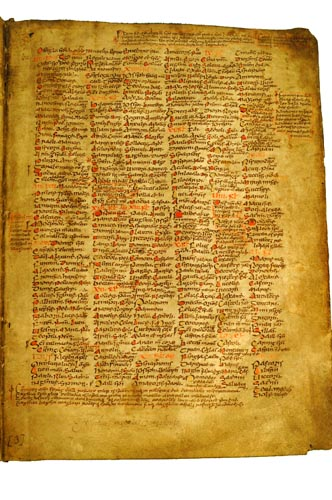
The Martyrology of Tallaght is an Irish martyrology from the late eighth century. It lists hundreds of saints from Ireland and beyond.

In various religions, a saint is a revered person who has achieved an eminent status of holiness, known as sainthood. The word saint comes from the Latin word sanctus, meaning 'holy', and although saint has been applied in other religious contexts, the word has its origins in Christianity. In Christianity, some religious authorities require that a person undergo a formal process of canonization to be recognized as a saint, such as the Catholic and Eastern Orthodox Churches. These churches also hold that a saint may intercede on behalf of the living who invoke them in prayer, a belief which is rejected by Protestants. Outside Christianity, the word saint has been extended to include revered figures in Buddhism, Chinese folk religion, Greek polytheism, Hinduism, Islam, Jainism, Judaism, Shinto, and Zoroastrianism.

== Christianity ==
=== Interdenominational ===
- Child
- Early Christian
- Military
- Royal
- By patronage
  - Ailments, illness, and dangers
  - Ethnic groups
  - Occupation and activity
  - Phalli
  - Places
- By name
  - Anastasia
  - Andrew
  - Catherine
  - Donatus
  - Leo
  - Paraskevi
  - Peter
  - Suzanne
  - Teresa
- By continent
  - Africa
  - Americas
    - Brazil
    - Mexico
    - United States
  - Asia
    - India
    - Persia
  - Europe
    - Sweden
    - British Isles
      - Anglo-Saxon England
      - Scotland
      - Cornwall
      - Hen Ogledd
      - Northumbria
      - Wales
  - Oceania
    - Australia

=== Anglican ===
- Traditional
- Modern

=== Eastern Orthodox ===
- By saint title
  - Myroblyte
  - Venerable
  - Confessor
  - Equal-to-apostles
- By place
  - Russia
    - Before 15th century
    - After 15th century
  - Serbia
  - United States

=== Folk Christianity ===
- By country

=== Lutheran ===
- By continent
  - North America
    - LCMS and ELCA

=== Oriental Orthodox ===
- By continent
  - Africa
    - Coptic

=== Catholic ===
- Chronological
- Old Covenant
- By order
  - Dominicans
  - Jesuits
- Popes
- By pope
- By continent
  - Africa
    - Algeria
  - North America
    - Canada
    - Central America and the Caribbean
    - Mexico
    - United States
  - South America
    - Argentina
    - Brazil
    - Colombia
  - Asia
    - India
    - Philippines
  - Europe
    - Brittany
    - Canary Islands
    - Catalonia
    - Croatia
    - Ireland
      - Post-reformation
    - Poland
      - Patron saints
    - Scandinavia
      - Iceland
      - Sweden
    - Malta
    - United Kingdom
      - Post-reformation
  - Oceania

== Other religions ==
=== Ancient Egyptian religion ===
- List of pharaohs deified during lifetime

=== Ancient Greek religion ===
- Heroes

=== Buddhism ===
- Bodhisattvas

=== Hinduism ===
- Gurus and sants

=== Islam ===
- Awliya Allah
- Sufi
- By continent
  - Africa
    - Algeria

=== Jainism ===
- Tirthankaras
- Ganadhara
- Jain Muni

=== Yazidism ===
- Holy figures

== See also ==
- List of all pages with titles containing "list of" and "saints"
- Hindu saints
- List of Christian martyrs
- List of Latter Day Saints
- Martyrology
- Secular saint
- List of pharaohs deified during lifetime
