= List of European saints =

This is a list of Saints, Blesseds and Venerables, who were born in, lived in, or died in Europe.

== Lists of saints by country or region ==
- List of Breton saints
- List of saints of the Canary Islands
- List of Catalonian saints
- List of Cornish saints
- List of Hungarian saints
- List of saints of Iceland
- List of saints of Ireland
- List of Maltese saints
- List of Northumbrian saints
- List of saints of Poland
- List of Russian saints
- List of Scandinavian saints
- List of Serbian saints
- List of Swedish saints

== Saints ==
- Alexei Nikolaevich Romanov, Tsarevich of Russia
- Alphonsus Ligouri, Italian religious priest
- Baptista Varani, Italian Poor Clare
- Barbara (Yakovleva), Russian nun
- Benedict Joseph Labre, French Franciscan tertiary
- Benedict Menni, French religious priest
- Bernard Due Van Vo, Vietnamese martyr
- Bernadette Soubirous, French religious sister
- Bidzina Cholokashvili, Georgian Christian martyr
- Bonifacia Rodríguez y Castro, Spanish nun
- Callistus Caravario, Italian martyr
- Carlo Acutis, Italian teenager
- Clement Mary Hofbauer, Moravian hermit
- Cuthbert Mayne, English martyr
- Domenico Savio, Italian teenager
- Edith Stein, German Discalced Carmelite and philosopher
- Ekvtime Takaishvili, Georgian historian
- Euphrosinia Kolyupanovskaya, Russian nun
- Ezechiele Ramin, Italian Comboni missionary
- Gabriel Urgebadze, Georgian Orthodox monk
- Gemma Galgani, Italian mystic
- Gerard Majella, Italian priest
- Grigol Peradze, Ukrainian artist and priest
- Hyacintha Mariscotti, Italian religious sister
- Ignatius Bryanchaninov, Russian archbishop
- Ignatius Maloyan, Armenian archbishop and martyr
- Ilia Chavchavadze, Georgian writer
- Saint Illuminata, Italian 4th-century martyr
- Jacinto Yaguachi, Polish-italian priest
- Jadwiga of Poland, princess
- Jan Sarkander, Czech-Polish Roman Catholic priest
- Joan of Arc, French virgin
- John Paul II, Polish priest and Pope
- John Vianney, French priest
- Josaphat Kuntsevych, Polish-Lithuanian Monk
- Joseph Freinademetz, Austrian religious priest
- Julie Billart, French religious sister
- Magdalena of Canossa, Italian religious sister and founder
- Marcellin Champagnat, French teacher
- Margaret Mary Alacoque, French religious sister
- Maria Goretti, Italian virgin martyr
- Marko Krizin, Croatian Roman Catholic priest
- Mary Euphrasia Pelletier, French religious sister and founder
- Mateo Correa Magallanes, Spanish martyr
- Maximilian Kolbe, Polish Franciscan and martyr
- Mother Teresa, Albanian religious sister
- Mutien-Marie Wiaux, French priest
- Nikolaevna Romanova, Grand Duchess of Russia
- Orest Kiprensky, Russian bishop
- Pio of Pietrelcina, Italian Capucchin
- Paisius Velichkovsky, Eastern orthodox monk
- Paschal Baylon, Spanish Franciscan
- Pauline of the Agonizing Heart of Jesus, Austrian religious sister
- Peregrine Laziosi, Italian religious priest of the Servite Order
- Philaret Drozdov, Russian archbishop
- Solomon Leclercq, French religious brother
- Solomonia Saburova, Grand princess of Moscow
- Sophia Olelkovich Radziwill, Lithuanian Orthodox wife
- Stephen of Hungary Hungarian king
- Théophane Vénard, Vietnamese martyr
- Titus Brandsma, Dutch Carmelite friar and martyr
- Vicenta María López i Vicuña, Spanish religious sister and founder
- Xenia of Saint Petersburg, Russian widow
- Yegor Chekryakovsky, Russian priest
- Zygmunt Gorazdowski, Polish Roman Catholic priest and founder

== Blesseds ==
- Alix Le Clerc, French religious sister
- Anna Kolesárová, Slovak virgin martyr
- Anastazy Jakub Pankiewicz, Polish Franciscan friar
- Annunciata Astoria Cocchetti, Italian religious sister and founder
- Artémides Zatti, Italian Salesian priest
- Ascensión Nicol y Goñi, Spanish religious sister and founder
- Assunta Marchetti, religious sister and founder
- August Czartoryski, Polish Salesian priest
- Basil Moreau, French religious priest and founder
- Bernardyna Maria Jabłońska, Polish religious sister and founder
- Bolesława Lament, Polish religious sister and founder
- Bonaventura Gran, Catalonian Franciscan friar
- Bonaventura Tornielli, Italian Servite priest
- Bronisław Kostkowski, Polish seminarian
- Bronisław Markiewicz, Polish Salesian priest
- Cecilia Eusepi, Italian Secular Servite
- Cecília Schelingová, Slovak religious sister
- Ceferino Giménez Malla, Spanish Franciscan tertiary
- Celine Borzecka, Polish religious sister and founder
- Chiara Badano, Italian laywoman and founder
- Ciriaco María Sancha y Hervás, Spanish bishop
- Costanza Starace, Italian religious sister
- Colomba Gabriel, Ukrainian Benedictine
- Columba Marmion, Irish Benedictine
- Domingo Iturrate Zubero, Spanish Trinitarian priest
- Edmund Bojanowski, Polish layman and founder
- Edmund Ignatius Rice, Irish religious priest and founder
- Edward Poppe, Belgian priest
- Engelmar Unzeitig, German religious priest of the Missionary Order of Marianhill
- Eusebia Palomino Yenes, Spanish religious sister of the Salesians
- Fidelis Chojnacki, Polish Capuchin friar and martyr
- Florida Cevoli, Italian Capuchin Poor Clare
- Franciszka Siedliska, Polish religious sister and founder
- Frédéric Janssoone, French priest
- Gennaro Maria Sarnelli, Italian Redemptorist
- Giacinto Longhin, Italian Capuchin friar and bishop
- Giulia Crostarosa, Italian Redemptorist nun
- Grzegorz Bolesław Frąckowiak, Polish religious priest of the Society of the Divine Word
- Hanna Helena Chrzanowska, Polish laywoman and Benedictine oblate
- Hendrina Stenmanns, German religious sister and founder
- Hildegard Burjan, German social politician and founder
- Honorat da Biała, Polish Capuchin friar
- Hryhoriy Khomyshyn, Ukrainian Greek Catholic bishop and martyr
- Hryhoriy Lakota, Ukrainian Greek Catholic bishop and martyr
- Hyacinthe-Marie Cormier, French Dominican friar
- Ignacy Kłopotowski, Polish priest and founder
- Innocenzo da Berzo, Italian Capuchin friar
- Inácio de Azevedo, Portuguese Jesuit and martyr
- Ippolito Galantini, Italian educator and founder
- Itala Mela, Italian theologian and Benedictine oblate
- Jacques-Désiré Laval, French Spiritan priest
- Janina Szymkowiak, Polish religious sister
- Jeanne-Germaine Castang, French religious sister
- Jeremiah of Wallachia, Romanian Capuchin friar
- Jerzy Popiełuszko, Polish priest and martyr
- Johann Nepomuk von Tschiderer zu Gleifheim, Austrian-Italian Bishop
- Johannes Ludovicus Paquay, Belgian Franciscan friar
- Josaphata Hordashevska, Ukranian Greek Catholic religious sister and founder
- Juan Nepomuceno Zegrí Moreno, Spanish priest and founder
- Jury Kashyra, Polish priest and martyr
- János Brenner, Hungarian Cistercian and martyr
- Jurgis Matulaitis-Matulevičius, Lithuanian bishop and founder
- Juana María Condesa Lluch, Spanish religious sister and founder
- Karolina Kózka, Polish virgin martyr
- Leonella Sgorbati, Italian religious sister and virgin martyr
- László Batthyány-Strattmann, Hungarian physician
- Lojze Grozde, German layman and martyr
- Ludovica Albertoni, Italian widow and Third Order Franciscan
- Maria Clara of the Child Jesus, Portuguese religious sister
- Maria Gabriella Sagheddu, Italian Trappist nun
- Manuela de Jesús Arias Espinosa, Mexican religious sister and founder
- Margaret Pole, Countess of Salisbury, English noblewoman
- Maddalena Caterina Morano, Spanish nun
- Marcel Callo, French Roman Catholic
- Marcelline Jayakody, father
- Margaretha Flesch, German religious sister and founder
- Marija Petković, Croatian nun
- Marianna Biernacka, Polish martyr
- Małgorzata Szewczyk, Polish nun
- Mary of the Divine Heart, German nun
- Mary of the Passion, French nun
- Marytė Melnikaitė, martyr
- Mercè Prat i Prat, Spanish nun
- Mieczyslawa Kowalska, young nun
- Mikael Ulumboeli, young martyr
- Miroslav Bulešić, Croatian priest
- Muktabai Dixit, writer
- Mutatesia Leonelli, writer
- Giulia Valle, nun
- Natalia Tułasiewicz, Polish teacher and martyr of World War II
- Nazju Falzon, Maltese cleric
- Nunzio Sulprizio, priest
- Nykyta Budka, Ukrainian clergyman
- Odoardo Focherini, Italian priest
- Ogasawara Gonnosuke, martyr
- Olena Hlibovyts'ka, nun
- Omgba Bissogo, soldier
- Otto Neururer, Austrian priest
- Panacea De' Muzzi, martyr
- Paola Renata Carboni, teenager
- Patricius Dong, martyr
- Pavel Djidjov, theologian
- Pavel Peter Gojdič, Slovak priest
- Peregrina Mogas Fontcuberta, Spanish nun
- Petar Barbarić, martyr
- Pétrus Ky, young soldier
- Pierina Morosini, Italian teenager of God
- Placid Olofsson, Hungarian priest
- Placide Viel, French nun
- Práxedes Mateo Sagasta, Spanish bishop
- Princess Vera Constantinovna of Russia, princess
- Prokopios Lazaridis, Turkish archbishop
- Purificacion Ximenez y Ximenez, young nun
- Rachelina Ambrosini, Child of God
- Regina Protmann, Polish nurse
- Rhoel Gallardo, priest
- Robert Naoussi, martyr
- Roman Lysko, Ukrainian priest
- Romanua Anazawa Matsujiro, young person
- Roza Robota, martyr
- Ryūnosuke Akutagawa, writer
- Samia Abdel-Messhis Mahrous, teenager
- Saozinha de Alenquer, young nun
- Sára Salkaházi, Hungarian teacher
- Santos Franco Sánchez, martyr
- Savina Petrilli, Italian nun
- Seraphina Sforza, Italian nun
- Shimun XVI Yohannan, martyr
- Sibell Lygon, Sister of Mary Lagon
- Silvio Dissegna, martyr
- Szilárd Bogdánffy, Hungarian auxiliary priest
- Stanislaus Kostka, Child of God
- Tarsykiya Matskiv, Ukrainian nun
- Terezija Banja, Polish nun
- Theodore Romzha, Ukrainian priest
- Thoj Xyooj Paj Lug, martyr
- Thomas Khamphuene Inthirath, martyr
- Thurston Hunt, British martyr
- Titus Zeman, Slovak priest
- Trần Phú, politician and religious
- Ulrico Sarti, martyr
- Ulrika, Ukrainian nun
- Ursula Yamamoto, child
- Valentine Uwingabire, martyr
- Victoire Brielle, laywoman
- Victoria Díez Bustos de Molina, friar
- Vasyl Velychkovsky, Ukrainian priest
- Ventura Martin Tejerizo], Spanish martyr
- Veronique Minaud, martyr
- Vsevolod Ivanovich, prince
- Walter Elias Chango Rondeau, martyr
- Wenceslau Claris Vilaregut, martyr
- Weronika Narmontowicz, nun
- Wite, holy woman from Dorset who was killed by marauding Danes
- Wojiech Piwowarczyk, priest
- Yakym Senkivskyi, Ukrainian blessed
- Yekaterina Gagarina, countess
- Yekuno Amlak, young emperor
- Zbigniew Stralkowski, martyr
- Zdenka Cecília Schelingová, nun
- Zefirino Agostini, Italian priest
- Zeinab Alif, nun
- Zofia Czeska, Polish religious figure
- Zoltán Meszlényi, Hungarian priest
- Zenon Iqaltoeli, Young martyr

== Venerables ==
- Alexandre Toé, French/African priest
- Alcide de Gasperi, Hungarian priest
- Andrey Sheptytsky, Metropolitan archbishop
- Annalena Tonelli, religious spokesperson
- Anne de Guigné, Child of God
- Anne de Xainctonge, French venerable
- Antonietta Meo, young Child of God
- Antonio Augusto Intreccialagli, archbishop
- Beda Chang, Chinese/European father
- Bodi Maria Magdolna, Child of God
- Benoîte Rencurel, French nun
- Bonaventura Duda, Croatian priest
- Celestina Bottego, Italian venerable
- Concepción Cabrera de Armida, Italian/Mexican writer
- Consuelo Ultrilla Lozano, nun
- Delia Tetreault, French nun
- Edvige Carboni, Italian Catholic
- Elena of Montenegro, princess
- Endre Bajcsy-Zsilinszky, priest
- Exupérien Mas, French teacher
- Feliksa Kozłowska, Matezcka
- Felix Mary Ghebreamlak, Italian/Eritrean priest
- Filomena Ferrer Galceran, martyr
- Francesc Xavier Butinyà i Hospital, Spanish teacher
- Guadalupe Ortiz de Landázuri Fernández de Heredia, Spanish doctor
- Hedwig Borzecka, Polish mother
- Ida Mari, Italian writer
- Ignazia Verzeri, Benedictine nun
- Ignatius Mrak, Slovenian priest
- Innocenzo Leonelli, soldier, hermit
- Isidoro Zorzano Ledesma, Spanish Opus Dei member
- Jan Bula, Czech priest
- Janez Frančišek Gnidovec, Slovenian bishop
- Joaquina Maria Mercedes Barcelo Pages, Spanish nun
- Klymentiy Sheptytsky, Bishop
- Kuys Varvara, religious figure
- Maria Orsola Bussone
- Margherita Occhiena, mother of John Bosco
- Matteo Ricci, S.J., Italian priest
- Mkhitar Sebastatsi, Armenian monk
- Montserrat Grases, Spanish Member of Opus Dei
- Nano Nagle, Irish venerable
- Pelágio Sauter, German priest
- Queen Emma of Hawaii, European/Hawaiian queen
- Romuald Jałbrzykowski, Polish priest
- Sante Spessotto, Mexican/Italian priest
- Théodelinde Bourcin-Dubouché, French nun
- Vital-Justin Grandin, French reverend
- Zygmunt Łoziński, Belarusian bishop
