= List of saints of Iceland =

The following is a list of saints of Iceland. The list includes all Christian saints with Icelandic connections, either because they were of Icelandic origin and ethnicity, or because they travelled to Iceland from their own homeland and became noted in their hagiography for their work in Iceland and amongst the Icelandic people. A small number may have had no Icelandic connection in their lifetime, but have nonetheless become associated with Iceland through the depositing of their relics in Icelandic religious houses in the Middle Ages.

== Thorlak Thorhallsson ==
Thorlak Thorhallsson (Icelandic: Þorlákur Þórhallsson) is the only canonized saint native to Iceland, and since 1984 has functioned formally as the country's patron saint despite centuries of devotion.

By the time of his birth, the Catholic Church was firmly established in Iceland following contention between Norwegian and German missionaries with native pagan religions in the two centuries preceding.

Thorlak was born into an aristocratic family in Hlíðarendi in 1133, Thorlak's parents noticed his budding intellectual capabilities and asked a local priest to instruct him. He was ordained a priest at age 18, and subsequently studied in Paris and perhaps England. After returning to Iceland in 1165, he founded a monastery of Canons Regular and devoted himself to a life of contemplative prayer.

He was ordained a bishop by Augustine of Nidaros in 1178 and worked to reform the Church and religious life in Iceland. He died on December 23, 1193, and his relics were translated to the cathedral of Skálholt in 1198.

His informal veneration in Iceland began less than a decade following his death with the translation of his earthly remains. Pope John Paul II canonized him in 1984, instituting his feast of December 23 on the liturgical calendar and designating him as patron saint of Iceland. The same pontiff visited Iceland five years following, at which occasion the Icelandic saga Þorláks saga helga (the Saga of Saint Thorlak) was republished in commemoration of the papal visit.

== Foreign saints and others associated with Iceland ==
Name	Lived	Feast Day	Notes
Brendan	5th Century	16 May	May have visited Iceland.
Nicholas, patron of seafarers	4th Century	6 December	Venerated by Icelandic Fishermen.
Olaf II	11th century	29 July	Popular foreign saint

== Effect of isolation ==
Many places like Iceland and Wales that were distant from Rome and in relative isolation were overlooked when it came to placing saints in the Catholic calendar. This explains why Iceland has only one saint recognised by the Vatican. The only canonised saint was elevated in 1984 by Pope John Paul II.

Nonetheless, and also like many isolated areas, Iceland has a handful of local persons historically venerated as saintly. Among these are Jón Ögmundsson and Guðmundur Arason, the first and fifth Bishops of Hólar respectively.

== Gallery ==
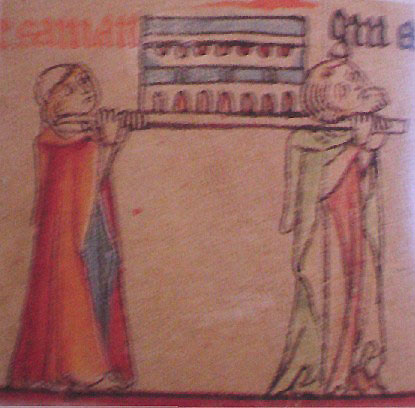
reliquary of Guðmundur Arason

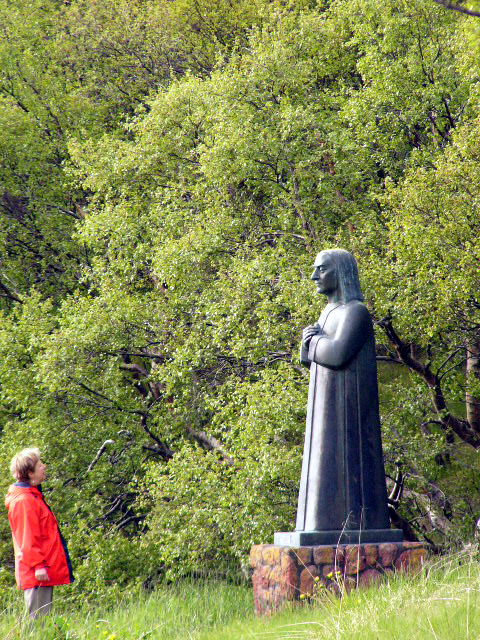
Statute of Guðmundur Arason.

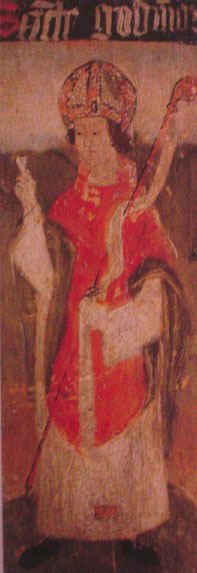
Manuscript showing Arason.

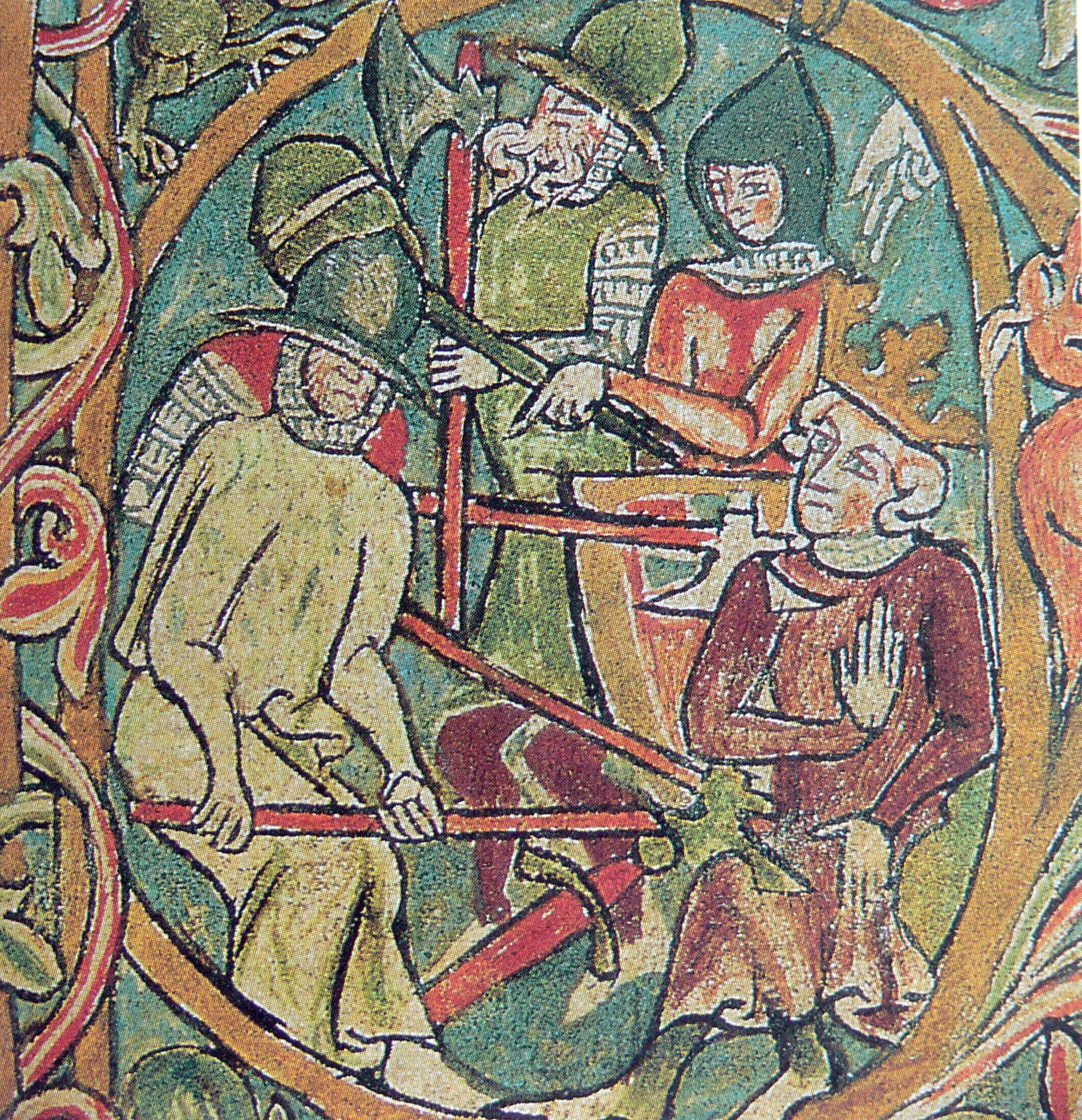
Olav der Heilige

Olav

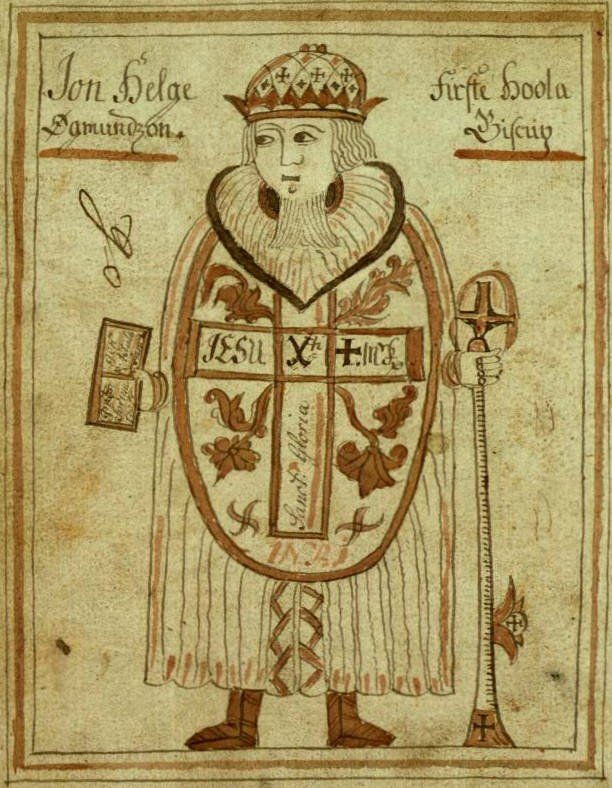
Jón Ögmundsson of Holár

== See also ==
- List of Anglo-Saxon saints
- List of saints of Ireland
- List of Cornish saints
- List of saints of Northumbria
- List of Breton saints
- List of Welsh saints
- List of Swedish Saints
- List of Russian saints
- List of saints of Poland
- List of Serbian saints
- List of American saints and beatified people
- List of Mexican saints
- List of Brazilian saints
- List of Saints from Oceania
- List of Australian saints
- List of saints of the Canary Islands
