= List of Australian Christian saints =

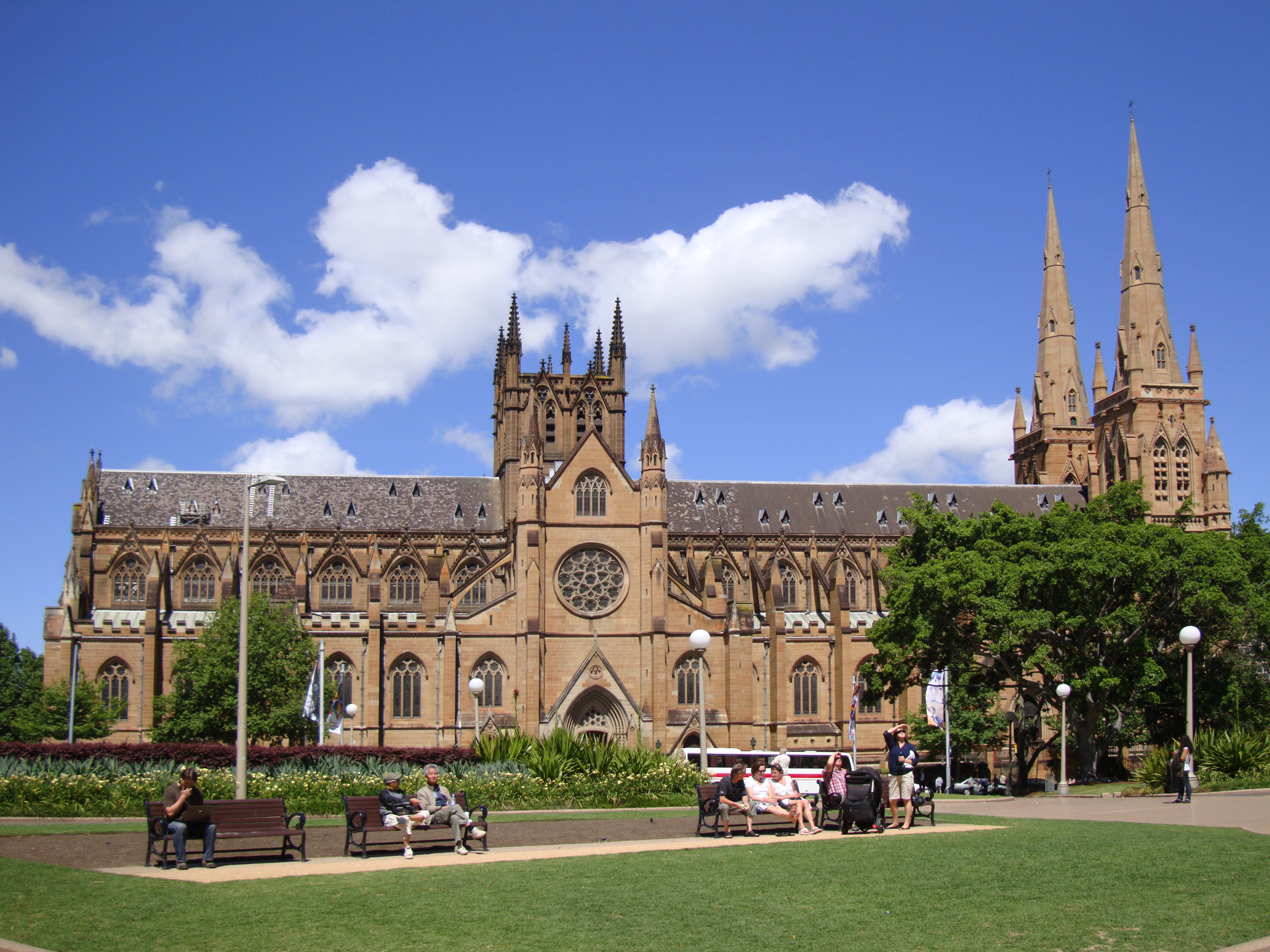
St Mary's Cathedral, Sydney

The Catholic and Orthodox churches recognize some deceased Christians as saints, blesseds, and Servants of God. Some of these individuals have Australian connections, either because they were of Australian origin and ethnicity, or because they travelled to Australia from their own homeland and became noted in their hagiography for their work in Australia and amongst the Australian people. A small number may have had no Australian connection in their lifetime, but have nonetheless become associated with Australia through the depositing of their relics in Australian religious houses.

== Catholic Church ==
=== Saints ===
- Mary Helen MacKillop (Mary of the Cross) (1842–1909), Founder of the Sisters of Saint Joseph of the Sacred Heart of Jesus (New South Wales, Australia)
  - Declared Venerable: 13 June 1992
  - Beatified: 19 January 1995 by Pope John Paul II
  - Canonized: 17 October 2010 by Pope Benedict XVI

=== Blesseds ===
None since 17 October 2010

=== Venerables ===
- Mary Glowrey (Mary of the Sacred Heart) (1887–1957), Professed Religious of the Society of Jesus Mary Joseph (Victoria, Australia - Bayalu Seeme, India)
  - Declared Venerable: 21 November 2025

=== Servants of God ===
- Caroline Jones Chisholm (1808–1877), Married Layperson of the Archdiocese of Canberra-Goulburn (England, United Kingdom - New South Wales, Australia)
- Eileen Rosaline O'Connor (1892–1921), Founder of the Society of Our Lady's Nurses for the Poor (Melbourne, Australia - New South Wales, Australia)
- Constance Helen Gladman (Mary Rosina) (1922–1964), Professed Religious of the Daughters of Our Lady of the Sacred Heart; Martyr (Koroit, Australia - East New Britain, Papua New Guinea)

=== Candidates for sainthood ===
- John Bede Polding (1794–1877), Professed Priest of the Benedictines (English Congregation); Archbishop of Sydney; Founder of the Sisters of the Good Samaritan (Liverpool, England – Sydney, Australia)
- Julian Tenison-Woods (1832–1889), Priest of the Archdiocese of Sydney; Cofounder of the Sisters of Saint Joseph of the Sacred Heart (London, England - Sydney, Australia)
- Angelo Ambrosoli (1824–1891), Priest of the Pontifical Institute for Foreign Missions (Salerno, Italy – New South Wales)
- Ellen Whitty (Mary Vincent) (1819–1892), Professed Religious of the Religious Sisters of Mary (Wexford, Ireland - Queensland, Australia)
- Charles O'Neill (1828–1900), Married Layperson of the Archdiocese of Sydney; Cofounder of the Society of Saint Vincent de Paul (Glasgow, Scotland – Sydney, Australia)
- Geraldine Gibbons (Scholastica) (1817–1901), Founder of the Sisters of the Good Samaritan (Kinsale, Ireland – New South Wales, Australia)
- Joseph Augustine [Giuseppe Agostino] Canali, (1841–1915), Priest of the Archdiocese of Brisbane (Rome, Italy - Queensland, Australia)
- David Bertram McCullagh (1911–1942) and Clifford Ambrose Brennan (1916–1942), Professed Priests of the Missionaries of the Sacred Heart; Martyrs (Australia - near Fuga Island, Cagayan, Philippines)
- Frederick Gerard Mannes (Augustinus) (1908–1942), John Clarence Roberts (John William) (1910-1942), and Francis Joseph Fitzgerald (Donatus Joseph) (1910-1942), Professed Religious' of the Marist Brothers of the Schools; Martyrs (Australia - Bougainville, Papua New Guinea)
- John Hawes (1876–1956), Priest of the Diocese of Geraldton and the Archdiocese of Nassau, church architect (Richmond, England – Florida, United States)
- Timothy Edward McGrath (1881–1977), Professed Priest of the Missionaries of the Sacred Heart; Founder of the Society of Our Lady's Nurses for the Poor (Victoria, Australia - New South Wales, Australia)
- Francis McGarry (1897-1955), lay missionary in Central Australia (Sydney, Australia)
- Kevin Lawlor (1955–1986), Professed Religious of the Franciscan Friars Minor; Martyr (New South Wales, Australia – Soroti, Uganda)
- Irene McCormack (1938–1991), Professed Religious of the Sisters of Saint Joseph of the Sacred Heart; Martyr (Western Australia, Australia - Junín, Peru)
- Bartholomew Augustine Santamaria (1915–1998), Married Layperson of the Archdiocese of Melbourne (Victoria, Australia)
- John Billings (1918–2007) and Evelyn Livingston Billings (1918–2010), Married Laypersons of the Archdiocese of Melbourne (Victoria, Australia)
- Rosemary Goldie (1916–2010), Layperson of the Archdiocese of Sydney (New South Wales, Australia)
- Jan Ruff-O'Herne (1923-2019), Campaigner against rape in war (Bandung, Dutch East Indies - Adelaide, Australia)
- Patrick Dougherty (1931–2010), Bishop of Bathurst (New South Wales, Australia)
- Paul Jackson (1937–2020), Professed Priest of the Jesuits (Queensland, Australia – Bihar, India)
- George Pell (1941–2023), Archbishop of Sydney (Ballarat, Australia – Rome, Italy)

== Orthodox Church ==
=== Saint ===
- The Venerable Father Nikanor (Savić) of Athos, Australia and New Zealand was the Abbot of Hilandar before moving to Australia to pacify the schism (resulting from communism and its fall) between the Patriarchal Diocese and the New Gracanica Metropolitanate's Diocese. He reposed in 1990, was glorified by the Serbian Orthodox Church in 2010, and celebrated each year on March 4 (both calendars).

== See also ==
- List of Saints from Oceania
- List of Anglo-Saxon saints
- List of saints of Ireland
- List of Cornish saints
- List of saints of Northumbria
- List of Breton saints
- List of Swedish Saints
- List of Russian saints
- List of saints of Poland
- List of Serbian saints
- List of American saints and beatified people
- List of Mexican saints
- List of Brazilian saints
- List of saints of the Canary Islands
