= Nebridius =

Nebridius or Nibridius may refer to:

- Nebridius, a friend mentioned in Augustine's Confessions
- Nebridius (praetorian prefect), count of the Diocese of the East (354–358)
- Nebridius (bishop of Barcelona) (fl. 540)
- Nebridius (bishop of Egara) (died c. 545), saint
- Nimfridius, often called Nebridius, archbishop of Narbonne (799–824)
- Nebridius (bishop of Bigorre)
