= List of Scandinavian saints =

Nordic countries include Denmark, Norway, Sweden, Finland, Iceland, Faroe Islands, and Åland Islands

This page is a list of Nordic saints, blesseds, venerables, and Servants of God, as recognized by the Roman Catholic Church. These people were born, died, or lived their religious life in Sweden, Norway, Iceland, Finland, and Denmark.

== Saints ==
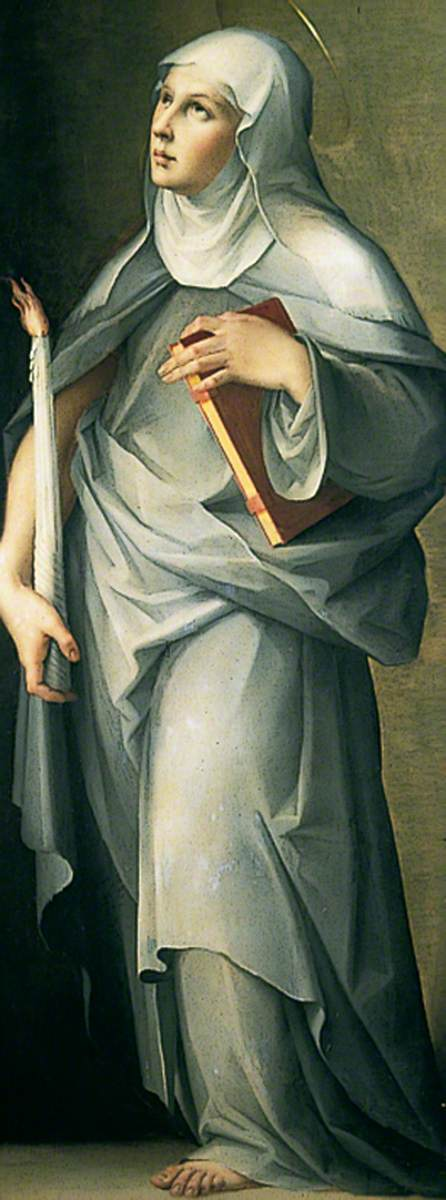
Saint Bridget of Sweden, one of the six patron saints of Europe

=== Saints from Early Church ===
- Saint Hallvard Vebjørnsson (ca. 1020 - 1043), Young Layperson of the Diocese of Oslo; Martyr per testimonium caritatis fortis (Lier - Drammensfjord, Norway)
- Saint David of Munktorp (died 1082), Professed Priest of the Benedictines (Subiaco Congregation) (Västmanland, Sweden)
- Saint Henrik of Finland (1100-1156), Apostolic Vicar of Finland; Martyr in odium fidei (England, United Kingdom – Helsinki, Finland)
- Saint Erik IX Jedvardsson (c. 1120–1160), Married Layperson of the Diocese of Stockholm; King of Sweden; Martyr in odium fidei

=== Pre-reformation Saints ===
- Saint Knud IV of Denmark (ca. 1042–1086), Married Layperson of the Diocese of Copenhagen; King of Denmark (Odense, Denmark)
  - Canonized: 19 April 1101 by Pope Paschal II
- Saint Sigfrid of Sweden (died 1067), Professed Priest of the Benedictines (Subiaco Congregation); Bishop of Växjö (Kronoberg, Sweden)
  - Canonized: 1158 by Pope Adrian IV
- Saint Olav II Haraldsson (c. 995–1030), Married Layperson of the Diocese of Oslo; King of Norway (Buskerus – Trøndelag, Norway)
  - Canonized: 1164 by Pope Alexander III
- Saint Knud Lavard (1096-1131), Layperson of the Diocese of Copenhagen; Martyr (Roskilde – Zealand, Denmark)
  - Canonized: 8 November 1169 by Pope Alexander III
- Saint Kjeld of Viborg (c. 1100–1150), Professed Priest of the Canons Regular of Saint Augustine (Viborg, Denmark)
  - Canonized: 11 July 1189 by Pope Clement II
- Saint Rögnvald Kali Kolsson (ca. 1100–1158), Married Layperson of the Diocese of Oslo (Jæren, Norway – Scotland, United Kingdom)
  - Canonized: 4 March 1192 by Pope Celestine III
- Saint Helena of Skövde (d. 1160), Married Layperson of the Diocese of Stockholm (Skövde, Sweden)
  - Canonized: 1164 by Pope Alexander III
- Saint Guillaume of Æbelhot (1125-1203), Professed Priest of the Canons Regular of Saint Augustine (Paris, France – Hillerød, Denmark)
  - Canonized: 21 January 1224 by Pope Honorius III
- Saint Vilhelm of Roskilde (d. ca. 1073), Bishop of Roskilde (Zealand, Denmark)
  - Canonized: 21 January 1224 by Pope Honorius III
- Saint Birgitta Birgersdotter (Bridget of Sweden) (ca. 1303–1373), Founder of the Order of the Most Holy Saviour (Bridgettines) (Uppland, Sweden – Rome, Italy)
  - Canonized: 7 October 1391 by Pope Boniface IX
- Saint Katarina Ulfsdotter (Catherine of Vadstena) (ca. 1332–1381), Professed Religious of the Order of the Most Holy Saviour (Bridgettines) (Vadstena, Sweden)
  - Canonized: 22 March 1484 by Pope Innocent VIII

=== Post-reformation Saints ===
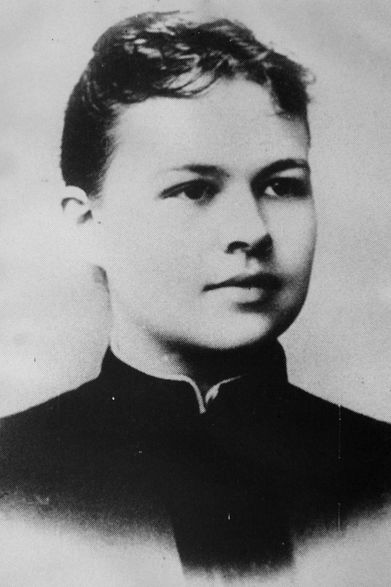
Elizabeth Hesselblad, the latest Scandinavian to be canonized by the Catholic Church

- Saint Willehad van Deem (1482-1572), Professed Priest of the Franciscan Friars Minor; Martyr (Schleswig-Holstein, Denmark – (South) Holland)
  - Beatified: 24 November 1675 by Pope Clement X
  - Canonized: 29 June 1867 by Pope Pius IX
- Saint Magnus Erlendsson (1080–1115), Layperson of the Diocese of Oslo; Martyr in odium fidei (Orkney, United Kingdom (formerly of Norway))
  - Beatified: Confirmation of Cultus
  - Canonized: 11 July 1898 by Pope Leo XIII
- Saint Thorlak Thorhallsson (1133-1193), Bishop of Skálholt (Fljótslíð – Skálholt, Iceland)
  - Beatified: Confirmation of Cultus
  - Canonized: 13 January 1984 (Note: By a decree dated 13 January 1984, the Congregation for the Divine Worship approved the Latin text for the Mass and Divine Office of Saint Thorlak, bishop of Skálholt, for the Diocese of Iceland.) by Pope John Paul II
- Saint Maria Elisabetta Hesselblad (1870-1957), Founder of the Bridgettines (Re-established) (Västra Götaland, Sweden – Rome, Italy)
  - Declared "Venerable": March 26, 1999
  - Beatified: 9 April 2000 by Pope John Paul II
  - Canonized: 5 June 2016 by Pope Francis

== Blesseds ==
=== Pre-reformation Blesseds ===
The title given to an individual whose cultus has been confirmed is "Blessed" unless the decree specifically declares the title to be "either Saint or Blessed" [sanctus vel beatus]. (Note: In 1634, through the decree Cælestis Hierusalem Cives, Pope Urban VIII forbade the existence of any public veneration on any purported saint unless a process per viam cultus directed by the Congregation of Rites could prove that an individual had been the object of an immemorial public veneration [cultus ab immemorabili tempore] at least one hundred years before the publication of the decree.) The following Scandinavians were designated with such title:

- Blessed Ingrid Elovsdotter (c. 1220–1282), Professed Religious of the Dominican Nuns (Östergötland, Sweden)
  - Beatified: 16 March 1499 by Pope Alexander VI
- Blessed Brynolf Algotsson (c. 1240–1317), Bishop of Skara (Västergötland – Skara, Sweden)
  - Beatified: 16 March 1499 by Pope Alexander VI
- Blessed Hemming of Turku (c. 1290–1366), Bishop of Åbo (Uppsala, Sweden - Turku, Finland)
  - Beatified: 16 March 1499 by Pope Alexander VI
- Blessed Nils Hermansson (c. 1325–1391), Bishop of Linköping (Östergötland, Sweden)
  - Beatified: 16 March 1499 by Pope Alexander VI

=== Post-reformation Blesseds ===
- Blessed Niels Steensen [Stensen] (1638-1686), Titular Bishop of Titiopolis (Copenhagen, Denmark – Schwerin, Germany)
  - Declared "Venerable": 12 January 1984
  - Beatified: 23 October 1988 by Pope John Paul II

== Venerable ==
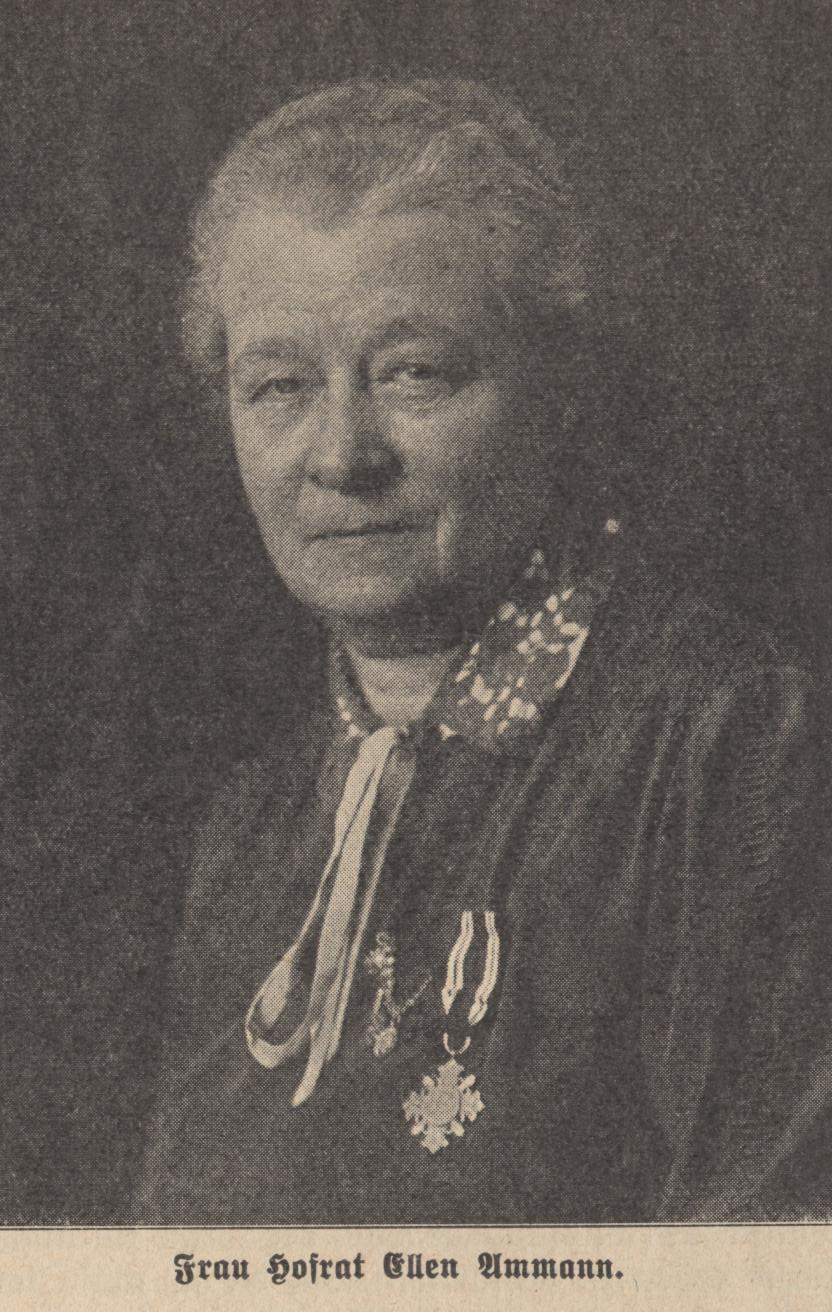
Ellen Ammann, foundress of German Catholic Women's Association

- Venerable Karl Halfdan Schilling (Karl Maria) (1835-1907), Professed Priest of the Barnabites (Oslo, Norway – Hainaut, Belgium)
  - Declared "Venerable": 17 September 1968
- Venerable Florence Catherine Flanagan (Maria Caterina) (1892-1941), Professed Religious of the Bridgettine Sisters (England, United Kingdom – Stockholm, Sweden)
  - Declared "Venerable": 23 March 2023

== Servants of God ==
- Servant of God Eysteinn Erlendsson (Note: In 1229, Archbishop Eysteinn was proclaimed a "saint" by a Norwegian synod, but no formal canonization process or confirmation of cultus was established by the Roman Catholic Church. Currently, his original status is Servant of God.) (c. 1120–1188), Archbishop of Nidaros (Trondheim, Norway)
- Servant of God Ellen Aurora Sundström Amman (1870-1932), Married Layperson of the Archdiocese of Munich-Freising (Stockholm, Sweden – Munich, Germany)
- Servant of God Stanisław Komar (1882-1942), Professed Religious of the Jesuits; Martyr (Stockholm, Sweden – KZ Dachau, Germany)
- Servant of God Madaleina Catherine Beuchamp Hambriugh (1887-1966), Professed Religious of the Bridgettine Sisters (England, United Kingdom – Rome, Italy)

== Candidates for Sainthood ==
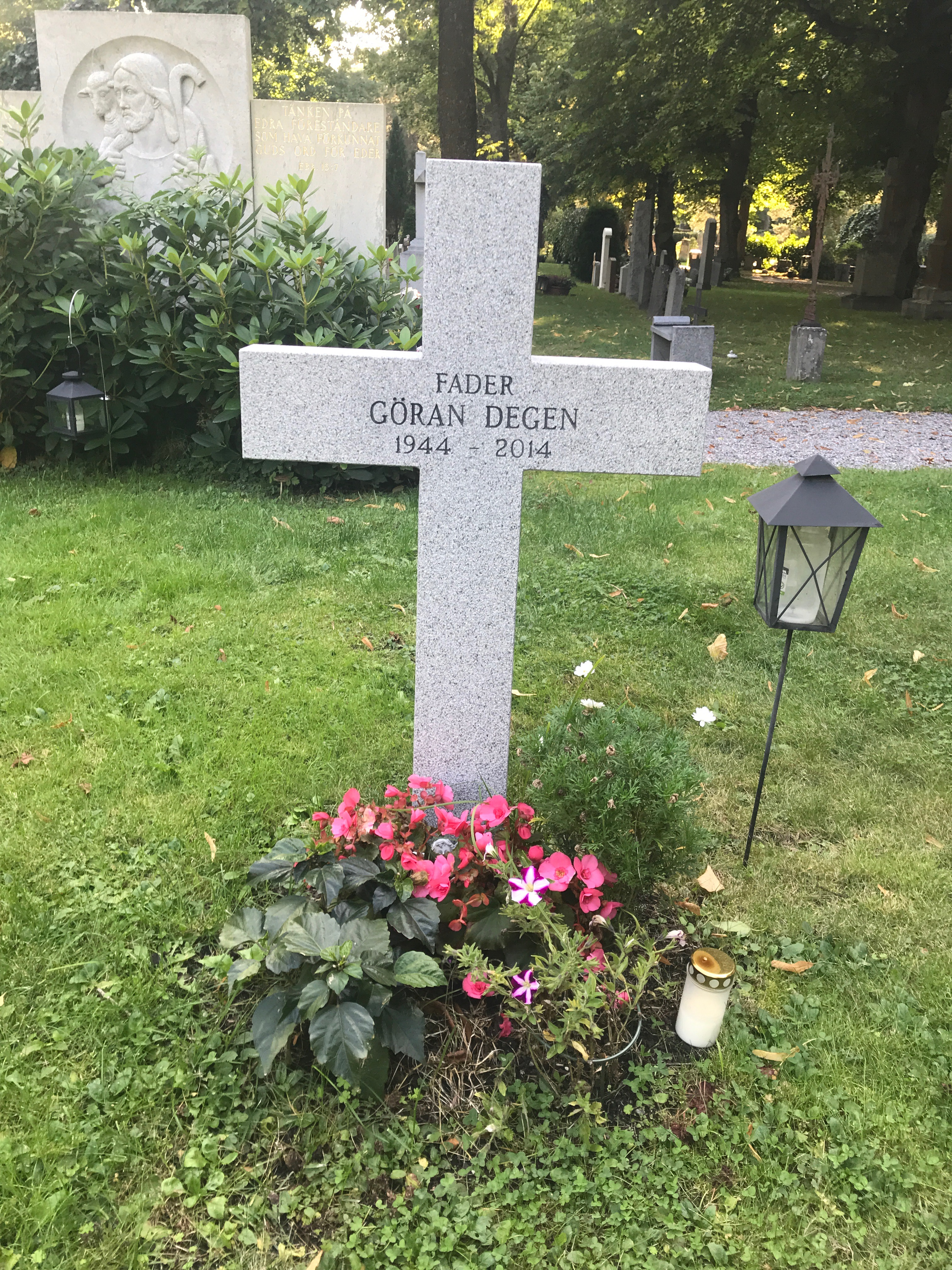
Grave of Msgr. Göran Degen, a saintly priest from Gothenburg

- Zackarias Olai Anthelius (ca. 1583–1624), Nicolaus Campanius (1593-1624) and Göran Bähr (1595-1624), Married Laypersons of the Diocese of Stockholm; Martyrs (Stockholm, Sweden)
- Joséphine Maximilienne de Beauharnais (1807-1876), Married Layperson of the Diocese of Stockholm; Queen of Sweden and Norway (Milan, Italy – Stockholm, Sweden)
- John Jensen (Benedict) (1889-1947), Professed Priest of the Franciscan Friars Minor; Martyr (Køge, Denmark – Jiangsu, China)
- Jóhannes Gunnarsson (1897-1972), Professed Priest of the Company of Mary, Montfort Missionaries; Apostolic Vicar of Iceland (Reykjavík, Iceland)
- Johannes Erik Müller (Johann Evangelista) (1877-1965), Professed Priest of the Benedictines; Apostolic Vicar of Sweden (Bavaria, Germany – Stockholm, Sweden)
- Brita Collett Paus (1917-1998), Married Layperson of the Diocese of Oslo (Nærøy – Oslo, Norway)
- Johan Castricum (1915-1999), Professed Priest of the Franciscan Friars Minor (Haarlem, Netherlands – Oslo, Norway)
- Georges Celest Stinissen (Wilfrid of the Christ the King) (1927-2013), Professed Priest of the Discalced Carmelites (Antwerp, Belgium – Tågarp, Sweden)
- Göran Degen (1944-2014), Priest of the Diocese of Stockholm (Stockholm, Sweden)
- Gunnel Vallquist (1918-2016), Layperson of the Diocese of Stockholm (Stockholm, Sweden)

== See also ==
- Congregation for the Causes of Saints
- List of saints of Iceland
- List of American saints and beatified people
- List of Brazilian saints
- List of Canadian Roman Catholic saints
- List of Central American and Caribbean saints
- List of Mexican saints
- List of Saints from Africa
- List of Saints from India
- List of Swedish saints
- List of European saints
