= List of saints named Catherine =

St. Catherine or Katherine may refer to a number of saints, including:

== Saints ==
- Catherine of Alexandria, Saint Catherine of the Wheel, or Great Martyr Saint Catherine (4th century)
- Catherine of Vadstena (c. 1332–1381), Swedish nun and author
- Catherine of Siena (1347–1380), TOSD Italian philosopher, theologian, doctor of the church and patron saint of Italy
- Catherine of Bologna (1413–1463), OSC Italian nun and artist
- Catherine of Genoa (1447–1510), Genoese mystic
- Catherine of Ricci (1522–1590), OP Italian nun, prioress and stigmatic
- Catherine of Palma (1531–1574), Spanish canon and mystic
- Catherine Tekakwitha or Lily of the Mohawks (1656–1680), Algonquin–Mohawk religious figure
- Catherine Yi (1783–1839), Korean martyr
- Catherine Labouré (1806–1876), DC French nun and Marian visionary
- Catherine Chong Chor-yom (1817–1846), Korean martyr
- Caterina Volpicelli (1839–1894), Neapolitan founder of the Handmaids of the Sacred Heart of Jesus
- Katharine Drexel (1858–1955), SBS American sister, heiress, philanthropist and educator

== See also ==
=== Blesseds ===
- Caterina Moriggi (1437–1478), also known as Catherine of Pallanza, Italian ascetic and founder of a religious order
- Catherine of Racconigi (1487–1574), TOSD Italian mystic and stigmatic
- Catherine of St. Augustine (1632–1668), OSA French canoness who served the sick in Quebec
- Catherine Jarrige (1754–1836), French worker with the poor
- Caterina Cittadini (1801–1857), Italian educator
