= List of Catalonian Catholic saints =

This page is a list of Catalan saints, blesseds, venerables, and Servants of God, as recognized by the Roman Catholic Church. These people were born, died, or lived their religious life in the Autonomous Community of Catalonia.

The history of the Catholic Church in Catalonia may date back to the earliest times, with visits of Paul and James. (The apparition of the Blessed Virgin to Saint James (Our Lady of the Pillar) occurred in neighboring Aragon.) The written record dates to the third century, with the Acts of the Martyrdom of the bishop Fructuosus and his deacons Augurius and Eulogius.

== List of saints ==
The patron saint of Catalonia is Saint George; there he is known as Sant Jordi.

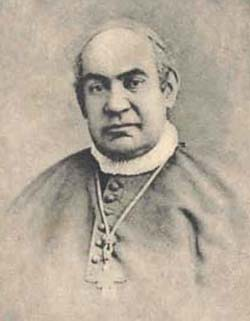
Antonio Marie Claret

- Anthony Mary Claret
- Carmen Salles y Barangueras
- Enrique de Ossó i Cervelló
- Eulalia of Barcelona
- Felix of Girona
- Francesc Gil de Federich de Sans (of the Martyrs of Vietnam)
- Francisco Coll Guitart
- Fructuosus of Tarragona
- Jaime Hilario Barbal
- Joaquim Masmitjà
- Joaquina Vedruna de Mas
- Josep Manyanet i Vives
- Joseph Oriol
- Justus of Urgell
- Maginus
- Michael de Sanctis
- Miguel Febres Cordero
- Nebridius
- Olegarius
- Ot of Urgell
- Pacian
- Paula Montal Fornés
- Pere Josep Almato Ribera Auras (of the Martyrs of Vietnam)
- Peter Claver
- Peter Nolasco
- Peter Sanz
- Raymond of Penyafort
- Raymond Nonnatus
- Rosa Francisca Dolors Molas Vallvé
- Salvador of Horta
- Severus of Barcelona
- Teresa Jornet Ibars

Other people have been canonized saints who, while Catalan by language or ancestry, were not from the modern community of Catalonia. An example is Junípero Serra. Also of interest, from the culturally and linguistically Catalan nation of Andorra, would be Mary as Our Lady of Meritxell.

== List of blesseds ==
- Thomas ‘Bookish Blessed’ Colleran
- Andres Sola Molist (of the Saints of the Cristero War)
- Anna Maria Janer Anglarill
- Francisco Castellet Vinale (Domingo) (of the Martyrs of Japan)
- Francisco Palau
- Francois-Benjamin May (Brother Lycarion)
- Jose Maria Gran Cirera (Of the Martyrs of Guatemala)
- Josep Tous Soler
- Juan Santamarta (of the Martyrs of Japan)
- Luis Exarch (Luis Bertran) (of the Martyrs of Japan)
- Manuel Domingo y Sol
- Maria Angela Astorch
- María Rafols Bruna
- Martyrs of the Spanish Civil War
  - Joan Roig i Diggle
  - Andreu Carrio Bertran
  - Bartomeu Arbona Estades
  - Braulio Martinez Simon
  - Candido Rivera y Rivera (Pedro)
  - Constanti March Battles
  - Demetrio Zurbitu Recalde
  - Dionisio Vicente Ramos
  - Eugenio Remon Salvador (Miguel)
  - Federico Lopez y Lopez (Alfonso)
  - Felipe Iriondo Amundarain
  - Felix Cots Olivera
  - Francesc Audi Cid
  - Francisco Javier Tena Colom
  - Francisco Remon Jativa
  - Gertrudis rita Florencia Suris Brusola (Maria Dolors)
  - Isabel Ferrer Sabria
  - Jaume Noguera Baro
  - Joaquim Maria Valenti de Marti
  - Joan Guix Marsal
  - Joan Rovira Orlandis
  - Jose Roma Carres
  - Josep Munoz Albiol
  - Josep Antoni Verges de Trias
  - Josep Llatje Blanch
  - Josep Sampol Escalas
  - Josepa Mongoche Homs (Maria de L'Asuncio)
  - Lluis Bogunya Porta
  - Lorenzo Isla Sanz
  - Manuel Peypock Sala
  - Maria Dolors Llimona Planas (Maria de Montserrat)
  - Miquel Mendoza Reig
  - Modesto Vegas y Vegas
  - Pedro Bruch Cotacans
  - Ramon Artigues Sirvent
  - Teresa Jimenez Baldovi (Maria del Socors)
- Pere Tarrés i Claret
- Peregrina Mogas Fontcuberta

== List of venerables ==
- Caterina Coromina i Agustí
- Coloma Antonia Marti Valls (Francesca of the Wounds of Christ)
- Dorotea Chopitea Villota Serra
- Esperanca Gonzalez Puig (Maria Esperanca of Jesus)
- Filomena Ferrer Galcerán
- Francisco Barrecheguren Montaeut
- Jacint Alegre i Pujals
- Jaume Clotet Fabres
- Joaquina Maria Mercedes Barcelo Pages
- José Gras y Granollers
- Josep Torras i Bages
- Juan Bonal Cortada
- Juan Collell Cuatrecasas
- Lliberada Ferrarons i Vives
- Magi Morera Feixas
- Maria Antonia Paris
- Maria del Carmen Albarracín Pascual
- Maria Guell Puig
- Maria Llorença Llong
- Maria Rosa Teresa Gay Tibau
- Montserrat Grases
- Paula Delpuig Gelabert (Paula of Saint Aloysius)
- Rosa Ojeda Creus
- Saturnina Jassa Fontcuberta
- Teresa Gallifa Palmarola
- Teresa Guasch Toda (Teresa of the Immaculate Heart of Mary)
- Teresa Toda Juncosa (Teresa of Saint Joseph)

== List of Servants of God ==
- Adolfo Rodríguez Vidal
- Angela Margarida Prat (Angela Serafina)
- Angelo Cantons Fornells
- Anna Maria Ravell Barrera
- Anna Narcisa Maria Soler Pi (Anna od Saint Sabina)
- Antoni Gaudí
- Bartomeu M. (Baldiri) Xiberta i Roqueta
- Buenaventura Codina y Augerolas
- Carme Badosa Cuartrecasas (Arcangela)
- Carme Sala Bigas (Maria Lourdes)
- Catalina de Balmaseda y San Martín
- Claudio López Bru
- Diego Peñalosa de Tolosa (of the Martyrs of La Florida)
- Encarnacio Colomina Agusti
- Enrique Pélach y Feliú
- Enrqiqueta Rodón Asencio (Maria Teresa)
- Eduardo Laforet Dorda
- Francesc Crusats Franch
- Francesc Sagrera Riera
- Francesc Xavier Butinyà i Hospital
- Gertrudis Castanyer Seda (non-causa)
- Guillem Rovirosa Albet
- Isabel Ventosa Reig (non-causa)
- José María Hernández Garnica
- Jose Maria Pujadas Ferrer
- Jose María Vilaseca
- Josefina Vilaseca Alsina
- Josep Maria Cases Deordal
- Juan Fonte, of the Jesuit Martyrs Companions of Hernando de Santaren
- Magdalena Aulina Saurina
- Magin Catalá
- Marc Castanyer Seda (non-causa)
- Maria Benedicta Daiber Heyne
- Maria Carme Surroca de Pastors
- Maria del Carme de Sojo Ballester de Anguera
- Maria Cristina Alonso y Alonso (Maria Cristina of the Eucharist)
- Maximina Garcia Presa (Maximina of Jesus Crucified)
- Miquel Palau Vila
- Pere Marcer Cusco
- Ramon Strauch i Vidal
- Rosa Deulofeu Gonzalez

== See also ==
- List of saints of the Canary Islands
- Roman Catholic Diocese of Sant Feliu de Llobregat
- Roman Catholic Diocese of Terrassa
- Roman Catholic Archdiocese of Tarragona
- Roman Catholic Diocese of Girona
- Roman Catholic Diocese of Lleida
- Roman Catholic Diocese of Solsona
- Roman Catholic Diocese of Tortosa
- Roman Catholic Diocese of Urgell
- Roman Catholic Diocese of Vic
