= List of saints named Peter =

Saint Peter commonly refers to Saint Peter (c. 1 – 64 AD) who was one of the original Christian apostles, and is the first Pope of the Catholic Church. Other saints with the given name, Peter, include:

- Saint Peter of Rates (d. c. 60 AD)
- Peter, martyred with Andrew, Paul and Denise, 250 AD
- Peter, martyred with Marcellinus (d. c. 304 AD)
- Peter, martyred with Gorgonius and Dorotheus (4th century)
- Pope Peter I of Alexandria (300–311)
- Peter Chrysologus (c. 380–c. 450), Bishop of Ravenna, known as the “Doctor of Homilies”
- Peter the Patrician (9th century), died 854, Byzantine monk
- Saint Peter the Wonderworker and Bishop of Argos (855–925), whose writings appear in Patrologia Graeca
- Saint Peter Damian (c. 1007–1072)
- Saint Peter Igneus (d. 1089)
- Saint Peter of Damaskos (c. 1027–1107)
- Saint Peter of Pappacarbone (d. 1123)
- Saint Peter Nolasco (1189–1256)
- Saint Peter Martyr (1206–1252), Saint Peter of Verona
- Saint Peter (d. 1220), one of the companions of Berard of Carbio
- Metropolitan Peter (d. 1326), patron saint of Moscow
- Saint Peter of Alcantara (1499—1562)
- Saints Peter Tuan, Peter Dung Van Dinh, Peter Da, Peter Duong Van Troung, Peter Francis Neron, Peter Hieu Van Nguyen, Peter Quy Cong Doan, Peter Thi Van Truong Pham, Peter Tuan Ba Nguyen, Peter Tuy Le, and Peter Van Van Doan, some of the Vietnamese Martyrs (died between 1625 and 1886)
- Saint Peter Claver (1580–1654)
- Saint Peter Fourier (1565–1640)
- Saint Peter of Saint Joseph de Betancur (1626–1667)
- Saint Peter the Aleut (d. 1815)
- Petar I Petrović-Njegoš (Saint Peter of Cetinje) (1747–1830), ruler of Montenegro and Montenegrin saint
- Saint Peter Yi Tae-chol of the Korean Martyrs (d. 19th century)
- Saint Peter Chanel (1803–1841), Catholic priest, missionary, and martyr.
- Saint Peter-Adrian (Pierre Adrien Toulorge) Norbertine canon regular, martyred during the French Revolution
- Saint Peter To Rot (1912–1945), martyred during the Japanese Occupation of New Guinea
