= List of saints named Suzanne =

Saint Suzanne may refer to a number of saints including:

- Susanna (Book of Daniel)
- Susanna (disciple)
- Saint Susanna, a saint whose feast day is August 11
- Saint Susanna Cobioje, also known as Saint Susanna Kobioje or Susanna Coboio
- St. Susanna U Sur-im, a Korean martyr canonised by Pope John Paul II
