= Małgorzata Szewczyk =

Polish religious sister and Blessed

Blessed Małgorzata Szewczyk
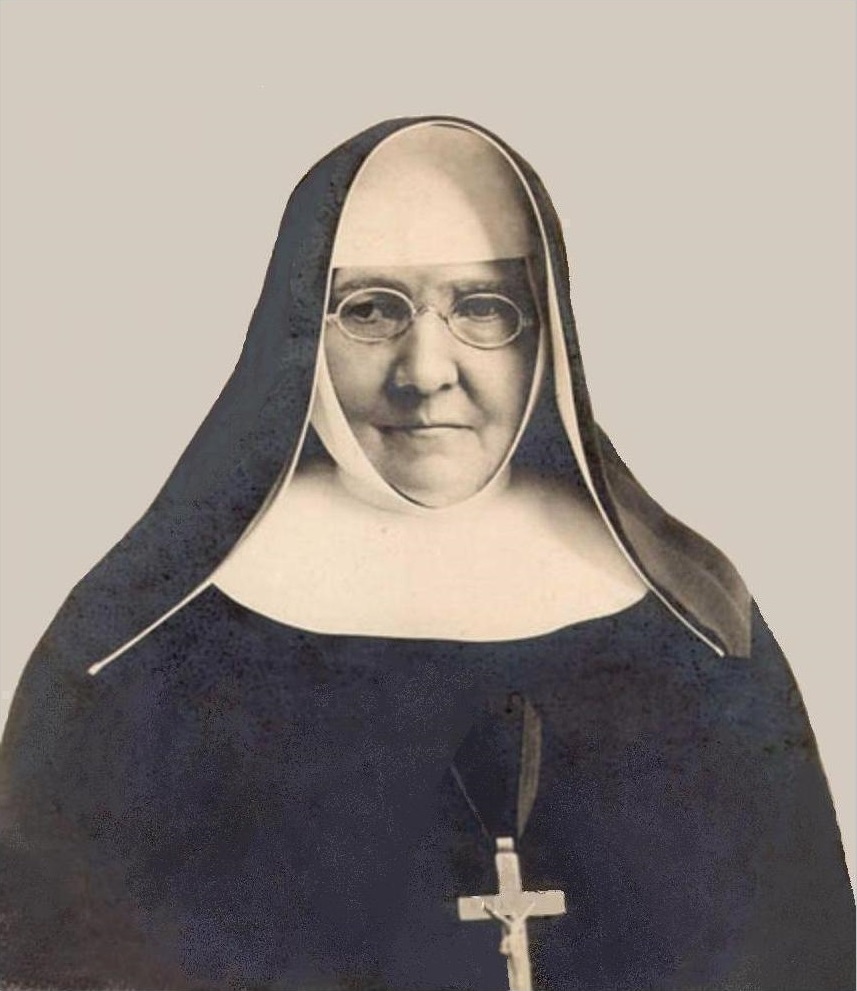
- Małgorzata Szewczyk around 1900
- Born: 1828; Shepetivka, Russian Empire (modern Ukraine)
- Died: 5 June 1905; Nieszawa, Aleksandrów, Congress Poland
- Venerated in: Roman Catholic Church
- Beatified: 9 June 2013, Sanktuarium Bożego Miłosierdzia, Kraków, Poland by Cardinal Angelo Amato
- Feast: 5 June

Małgorzata Szewczyk (1828 – 5 June 1905), also known by her religious name Łucja, was a Polish religious sister and the foundress of the Daughters of the Sorrowful Mother of God (or "Seraphic Sisters"); she was also a member of the Third Order of Saint Francis. Her life was dedicated to the care of ill people and she spent a long period to that end in Israel and Palestine before returning to her native Poland where she became a close collaborator of Honorat Kozminski. Her initiatives to aid the poor and those in need included tending to elder women in her apartments or in going to hospitals and in the streets to help those that needed her charitable assistance.

Her beatification cause started on 25 August 1993 and she later became titled as Venerable on 19 December 2011; she was beatified in Poland on 9 June 2013.

== Life ==
Małgorzata Szewczyk was born circa 1828 in Shepetivka, now modern Ukraine. Her parents were Jan and Marianna; her mother was her father's second wife and her father had a daughter with his deceased former wife. In her childhood she lost her parents – her father in 1835 and her mother in 1837 – and her older half-sister oversaw her care and upbringing as a result. Her half-sister taught Szewczyk basic arithmetic and had married at this point but still took good care of her. Sometime from 1837 to 1840 she made her First Communion and received her confirmation.

Her call to the religious life was constant and so in 1848 she entered the Third Order of Saint Francis. Due to the political situation in her occupied Poland she was not able to join a second religious order. To strengthen her faith and love for God in 1870 she undertook a pilgrimage to the Holy Land. This moved her to a profound degree and her experience prompted her to dedicate her life to help the poor and the ill as well as the old. Her trip to the Middle East was via boat to Haifa and then first to Jerusalem. While living in Jerusalem, she worked at St Joseph’s Hospital. She spent time living in Nazareth and left there in 1872 for Poland though making a brief detour as a pilgrim to Loreto. This desire to become a religious was one that she spoke of to her confessor Honorat Kozminski who approved of her decision and encouraged her to begin her work. The two first met in the autumn of 1873 in Warsaw where she visited and it was he who oversaw her Franciscan development while she lived and worked at an orphanage from 1873 to 1878; Kozminski received her Franciscan vows on 8 April 1881 after she had made her initial vows on 24 August 1878.

The first step she made was to invite two poor and sick elder women to live in her apartment in Zakroczem in 1880. She took care of them in secret as charitable or church activities were forbidden according to the decrees of the Russian Emperor who at the time ruled over Poland. It was not too long before a few more women moved in with her and joined her in her work and so she rented another apartment in 1884 in Warsaw. Later, to accommodate the growing number and better serve those in need, she decided to purchase a new house with a garden.

In 18 April 1881, following the advice of Kozminski, she founded a new religious congregation whose aim was to help the poor and those who were most in need. The congregation became the Seraphic Sisters and Szewczyk assumed the religious name Łucja. The congregation founded several institutions to help people in need, including an orphanage, a men’s shelter and a sewing workshop for girls; they also worked in hospitals and schools.

Łucja was the Superior General for 23 years, from the congregation's establishment until ill health on 27 April 1904 prompted her resignation.

The last months of her life were spent in Nieszawa. Her constant work ethic and extensive service to others took a toll on her health and towards the end of her life she developed a series of difficult health problems. Her death came on the morning of 5 June 1905. She died at her convent (she had received the Anointing of the Sick) and she had suffered from poor sight prior to her death. Ecclesial authorities granted special permission on 16 November 1931 for her remains to be moved to Oswiecim and interred in the congregation's corresponding church but were relocated on two other occasions on 18 January 1951 and 22 February 2013. The congregation now operates in places such as Belarus and France and in 2005 had 679 religious sisters in 76 houses. It received the papal decree of praise from Pope Pius X on 12 February 1909 and pontifical approval from Pope Pius XII on 3 March 1953. In 2026, the congregation is part of the Franciscan Capuchin family.

== Beatification ==
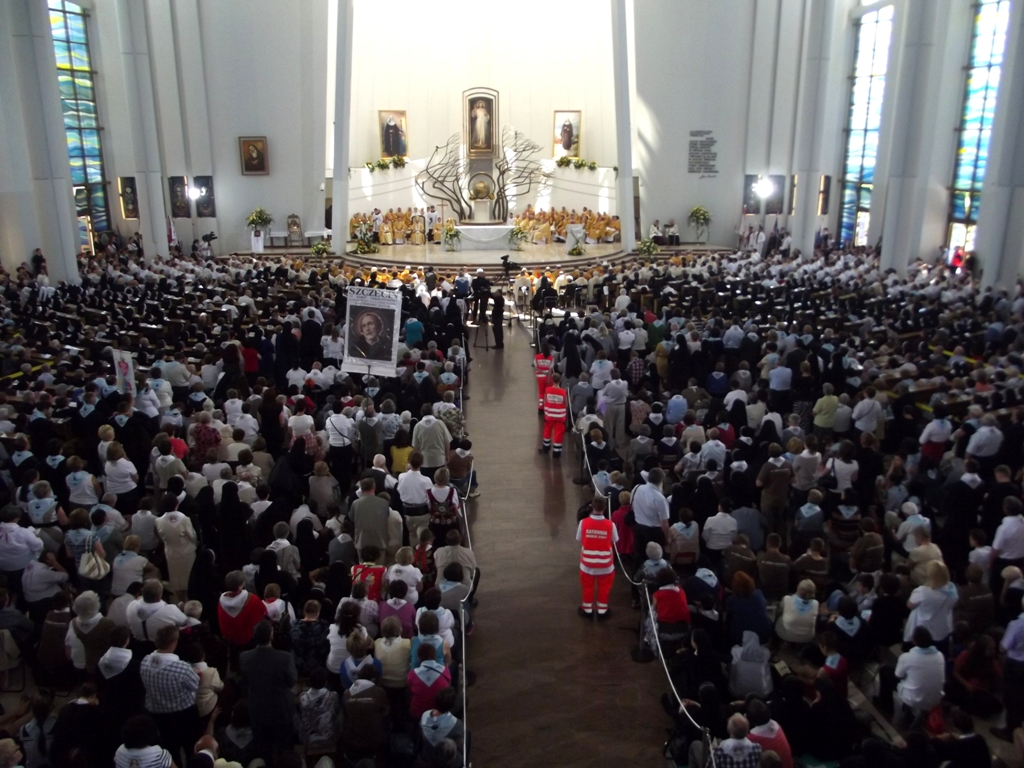
Holy mass of the beatification in 2013

The beatification process opened under Pope John Paul II on 25 August 1993 after the Congregation for the Causes of Saints issued the official nihil obstat and titled her as a Servant of God; the diocesan process opened in the Kraków archdiocese and Cardinal Franciszek Macharski oversaw it from 9 November 1993 until its closure on 15 June 1996. The Congregation for the Causes of Saints later validated this process in Rome on 6 December 1996 while later receiving the positio dossier in 2008. Theological advisors approved the cause's continuation on 5 October 2010 as did the Congregation on 6 December 2011 which allowed for Pope Benedict XVI to confirm Szweczyk's heroic virtue and name her as venerable on 19 December 2011.

The miracle that led to her beatification was the 1975 cure of a nun from a severe case of pneumonia; this was investigated on a diocesan level and it received validation on 22 January 1999 before medical experts approved it on 23 February 2012. The theologians approved this miracle on 7 July 2012 as did the Congregation on 10 December 2012; Pope Benedict XVI approved the miracle on 20 December 2012 and confirmed that Szewczyk would be beatified. Cardinal Angelo Amato presided over the beatification on the behalf of Pope Francis on 9 June 2013. The postulator for this cause is Michał Jagosz.
