= Justus of Urgell =

Spanish saint (fl. 6th century)

Saint Justus of Urgell
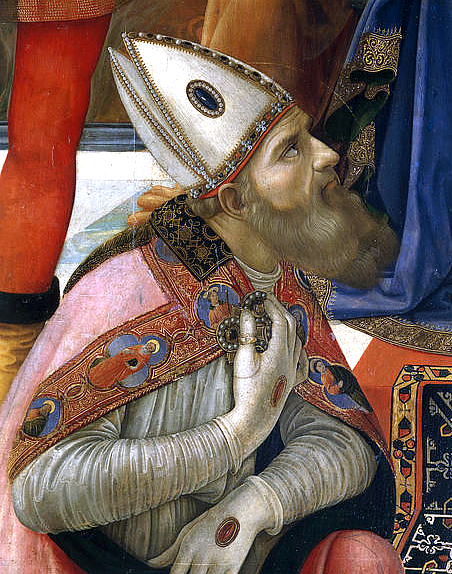
- Died: c. 527 AD
- Venerated in: Roman Catholic Church, Eastern Orthodox Church
- Feast: 28 May

Justus of Urgell (Catalan: Sant Just, Spanish: San Justo; died after 546 AD) was a Spanish bishop and saint.

He is the first recorded bishop of Urgell, and participated in the Second Council of Toledo in 527. He also attended the First Council of Lleida in 546, and Valencia that same year. He wrote a work on the Canticle of Canticles and dedicated it to Sergius, Archbishop of Tarragona.

He is mentioned by Isidore of Seville, who considered him one of the “illustrious men" of whose lives he wrote. According to Isidore, Justus had three brothers who were also saints: Nebridius, bishop of Egara and then bishop of Barcelona; Elpidius; and Justinian.

Justus has been listed in the Roman martyrology on 28 May, his feast day, since ancient times.
