= List of venerated Brazilian Catholics =

This page is a list of Brazilian saints, blesseds, venerables, and Servants of God, as recognized by the Catholic Church. These people were born, died, or ministered in Brazil.

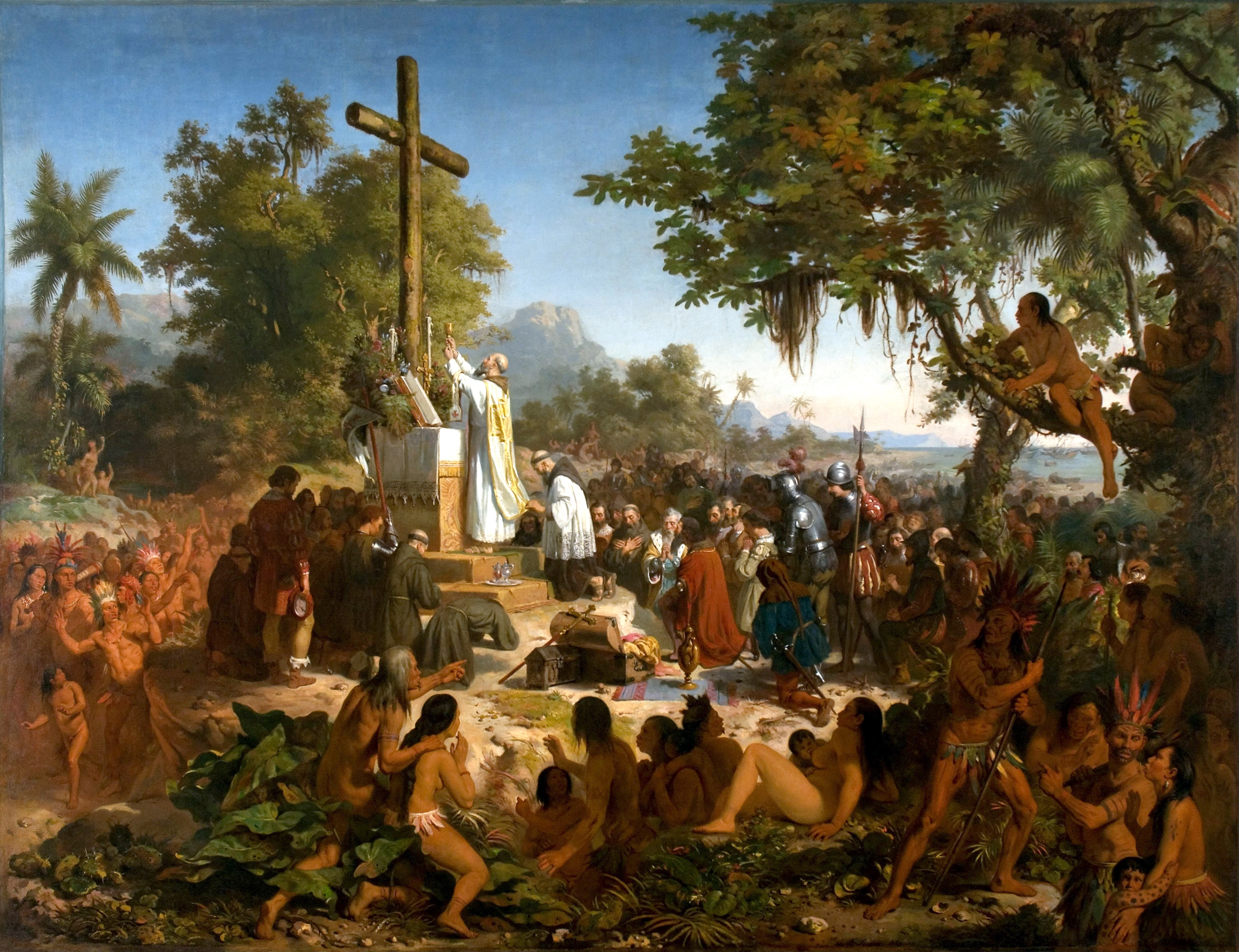
Victor Meirelles's "The first Mass in Brazil", 1861

The Catholic Church has been present in the territory of the modern nation of Brazil since the first Mass was said there in 1500 and today claims the largest population of Catholics of any country in the world. Nonetheless, the country has produced few officially canonized saints thus far.

== Saints ==
The following is the list of saints, in the order in which they were canonized.

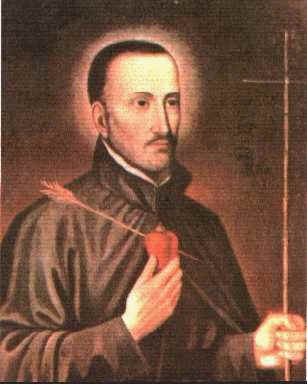
Father Roque González de Santa Cruz, SJ

- Martyrs of Río de la Plata (Rio Grande do Sul, Brazil):
  - Roque González y de Santa Cruz (1576–1628), Professed Priest of the Jesuits (Asunción, Paraguay)
  - Adolfo Rodríguez Obnel (1598–1628), Professed Priest of the Jesuits (Zamora, Spain)
  - Juan del Castillo Rodríguez (1595–1628), Professed Priest of the Jesuits (Cuenca, Spain)
    - Venerated: January 15, 1933
    - Beatified: January 28, 1934 by Pope Pius XI
    - Canonized: May 16, 1988 by Pope John Paul II
- Amabile Visintainer (Paulina of the Agonizing Heart of Jesus) (1865–1942), Founder of the Little Sister of Immaculate Concepcion (Trent, Italy – São Paulo, Brazil)
  - Venerated: February 8, 1988
  - Beatified: October 18, 1991 by Pope John Paul II
  - Canonized: May 19, 2002 by Pope John Paul II
- Antonio Galvao de Franca (Antonio of Saint Anne) (1739–1822), Professed Priest of the Franciscan Friars Minor (São Paulo, Brazil)
  - Venerated: March 8, 1997
  - Beatified: October 25, 1998 by Pope John Paul II
  - Canonized: May 11, 2007 by Pope Benedict XVI
- José de Anchieta (1534–1597), Professed Priest of the Jesuits (Tenerife, Spain – Espírito Santo, Brazil)
  - Venerated: August 10, 1786
  - Beatified: June 22, 1980 by Pope John Paul II
  - Canonized: April 3, 2014 by Pope Francis
- André de Soveral and 29 Companions (d. 1645), Priests and Laypersons of the Archdiocese of Natal; Martyr (Brazil)
  - Venerated: December 21, 1998
  - Beatified: March 5, 2000 by Pope John Paul II
  - Canonized: October 15, 2017 by Pope Francis
- Maria Rita Lopes Pontes de Souza Brito (Dulce) (1914–1992), Professed Religious of the Missionary Sisters of the Immaculate Conception (Brazil)
  - Venerated: April 3, 2009
  - Beatified: May 22, 2011 by Cardinal Geraldo Majella Agnelo
  - Canonized: October 13, 2019 by Pope Francis

== Blesseds ==
- Inácio de Azevedo and 39 Jesuit Companions (d. 1570), Professed Priests, Religious', Novices and Clerics of the Jesuits; Martyrs (aboard the Santiago toward Santa Cruz de Tenerife, Spain)
  - Venerated: n/a
  - Beatified: May 11, 1854 by Pope Pius IX
- Hubertus Van Lieshout [Eustachius] (1890–1943), Professed Priest of the Congregation of Sacred Hearts of Jesus and Mary (Picpus) (North Brabant, Netherlands – Minas Gerais, Brazil)
  - Venerated: April 12, 2003
  - Beatified: June 15, 2006 by Cardinal José Saraiva Martins, C.M.F.
- Mariano de la Mata Aparicio (1905–1983), Professed Priest of the Augustinians (Palenca, Spain – São Paulo, Brazil)
  - Venerated: December 20, 2004
  - Beatified: November 5, 2006 by Cardinal José Saraiva Martins, C.M.F.
- Albertina Berkenbrock (1919–1931), Child of the Diocese of Tubarão; Martyr of Chastity (Santa Catarina, Brazil)
  - Venerated: December 16, 2006
  - Beatified: October 20, 2007 by Cardinal José Saraiva Martins, C.M.F.
- Adílio Daronch (1908–1924), Child of the Diocese of Frederico Westphalen; Martyr (Rio Grande do Sul, Brazil)
  - Venerated: December 16, 2006
  - Beatified: October 21, 2007 by Cardinal José Saraiva Martins, C.M.F.
- Manuel Gómez González (1877–1924), Priest of the Diocese of Frederico Westphalen; Martyr (Pontevedra, Spain – Rio Grande do Sul, Brazil)
  - Venerated: December 16, 2006
  - Beatified: October 21, 2007 by Cardinal José Saraiva Martins, C.M.F.
- Lindalva Justo de Oliveira (1953–1993), Vowed Member of the Daughters of Charity of Saint Vincent de Paul; Martyr of Chastity (Rio Grande do Sul – Bahia, Brazil)
  - Venerated: December 16, 2006
  - Beatified: December 2, 2007 by Cardinal José Saraiva Martins, C.M.F.
- Barbara Maix (Maria Barbara of the Holy Trinity) (1818–1873), Founder of the Sisters of the Immaculate Heart of Mary (Vienna, Austria – Rio de Janeiro, Brazil)
  - Venerated: July 3, 2008
  - Beatified: November 6, 2010 by Archbishop Lorenzo Baldisseri
- Francisca de Paula de Jesus [Nhá Chica] (1810–1895), Laywoman of the Diocese of Campanha (Minas Gerais, Brazil)
  - Venerated: January 14, 2011
  - Beatified: May 4, 2013 by Cardinal Angelo Amato, S.D.B.
- Assunta Marchetti (1871–1948), Cofoundress of the Missionaries of Saint Charles Borromeo (Scalabrinian Sisters) (Lucca, Italy – São Paulo, Brazil)
  - Venerated: December 19, 2011
  - Beatified: October 25, 2014 by Cardinal Angelo Amato, S.D.B.
- Francisco de Paula Victor (1827–1905), Priest of the Diocese of Campanha (Minas Gerais, Brazil)
  - Venerated: May 10, 2012
  - Beatified: November 14, 2015 by Cardinal Angelo Amato, S.D.B.
- Giovanni Schiavo (1903–1967), Professed Priest of the Josephites of Murialdo (Vicenza, Italy – Rio Grande do Sul, Brazil)
  - Venerated: December 14, 2015
  - Beatified: October 28, 2017 by Cardinal Angelo Amato, S.D.B.
- Donizetti Tavares de Lima (1882–1961), Priest of the Diocese of São João da Boa Vista (Minas Gerais – São Paulo, Brazil)
  - Venerated: October 9, 2017
  - Beatified: November 23, 2019 by Cardinal Giovanni Angelo Becciu
- Benigna Cardoso da Silva (1928–1941), Child Laywoman of the Diocese of Crato; Martyr of Chastity (Ceará, Brazil)
  - Declared "Venerable": October 2, 2019
  - Beatified: October 24, 2022 by Cardinal Leonardo Ulrich Steiner
- Isabel Cristina Mrad Campos (1962–1982), Young Laywoman of the Archdiocese of Mariana; Martyr of Chastity (Minas Gerais, Brazil)
  - Declared "Venerable": October 27, 2020
  - Beatified: December 10, 2022 by Cardinal Raymundo Damasceno Assis
- Nazareno Lanciotti (1940–2001), Professed Priest of the Vicariate o Rome; Fidei Donum Missionary in the Diocese of São Luiz de Cáceres; Member of the Marian Movement for Priests; Martyr (Rome, Italy – São Paulo, Brazil)
  - Declared "Venerable": April 14, 2025
  - Beatified: June 13, 2026 by Cardinal João Braz de Aviz

== Venerables ==
- Louise-Josephine Voiron [Marie-Theodore] (1835–1925), Professed Religious of the Sisters of Saint Joseph of Chambéry (Savoie, France – São Paulo, Brazil)
  - Declared "Venerable": February 18, 1989
- Maria Conchita Farani [Antonieta of Sait Michael the Archangel] (1906–1963), Professed Religious of the Passionist Sisters of Saint Paul of the Cross (Paraná – São Paulo, Brazil)
  - Declared "Venerable": June 13, 1992
- Rudolf Komorek (1890–1949), Professed Priest of the Salesians of Don Bosco (Bielsko-Biała, Poland – São Paulo, Brazil)
  - Declared "Venerable": April 6, 1995
- Attilio Giordani (1913–1972), Married Layperson of the Archdiocese of Milan; Member of the Salesian Cooperators (Milan, Italy – Mato Grosso do Sul, Brazil)
  - Declared "Venerable": October 9, 2013
- Noeme Cinque [Serafina] (1913–1988), Professed Religious of the Adorers of the Blood of Christ (Amazonas, Brazil)
  - Declared "Venerable": January 27, 2014
- Maria Dulce Rodrigues dos Santos [Maria Teresa of the Eucharistic Jesus] (1901 - 1972), Founder of the Little Missionary Sisters of Mary Immaculate (São Paulo, Brazil)
  - Declared "Venerable": April 3, 2014
- Antônio Ferreira Viçoso (1787–1875), Professed Priest of the Congregation of the Mission (Vincentians); Bishop of Mariana (Lisbon, Portugal – Minas Gerais, Brazil)
  - Declared "Venerable": July 8, 2014
- Pelagio Sauter (1878–1961), Professed Priest of the Redemptorists (Zollernalbkreis, Germany – Goiânia, Brazil)
  - Declared "Venerable": November 7, 2014
- Giuseppe Marchetti (1869–1896), Professed Priest of the Scalabrinians; Cofounder of the Missionaries of Saint Charles Borromeo (Scalabrinian Sisters) (Lucca, Italy – São Paulo, Brazil)
  - Declared "Venerable": July 8, 2016
- Felice Rossini [Daniele of Samarate] (1876–1924), Professed Priest of the Franciscan Capuchins (Varese, Italy – Pará, Brazil)
  - Declared "Venerable": March 23, 2017
- Pio Giannotti [Damiano of Bozzano] (1898–1997), Professed Priest of the Franciscan Capuchins (Lucca, Italy – Pernambuco, Brazil)
  - Declared "Venerable": April 6, 2019
- Nelson Santana [Nelsinho] (1955 - 1964), Child Layperson of the Diocese of Sao Carlos (São Paulo, Brazil)
  - Declared "Venerable": April 6, 2019
- Hermínio Pinzetta [Salvador] (1911–1972), Professed Religious of the Franciscan Capuchins (Rio Grande do Sul, Brazil)
  - Declared "Venerable": May 13, 2019
- Dinah Amorim [Maria of the Angels] (1917–1988), Professed Religious of the Daughters of Mary - Escolapias (Minas Gerais – Rio de Janeiro, Brazil)
  - Declared "Venerable": December 11, 2019
- Carmen Catarina Bueno [Maria do Carmo of the Holy Trinity] (1898–1966), Professed Religious of the Discalced Carmelite Nuns (São Paulo, Brazil)
  - Declared "Venerable": January 23, 2020
- Roberto Giovanni (1903–1994), Professed Religious of the Stigmatines (São Paulo, Brazil)
  - Declared "Venerable": October 27, 2020
- Albino Alves da Cunha Silva (1882–1973), Professed Priest of the Diocese of Catanduva (Celorico de Basto – São Paulo, Brazil)
  - Declared "Venerable": February 20, 2021
- Odette Vidal Cardoso [Odetinha] (1930–1939), Child Laywoman of the Archdiocese of São Sebastião do Rio de Janeiro (Rio de Janeiro, Brazil)
  - Declared "Venerable": November 25, 2021
- Maria da Conceição Santos [Benigna Victim of Jesus] (1907–1981), Professed Religious of the Sisters Helpers of Our Lady of Mercy (Minas Gerais, Brazil)
  - Declared "Venerable": February 18, 2022
- Clemente Recalcati [Giampietro of Sesto San Giovanni] (1868–1913), Professed Priest of the Franciscan Capuchins; Founder of the Missionary Capuchin Sisters of Saint Francis of Assisi (Milan, Italy – Ceará, Brazil)
  - Declared "Venerable": May 21, 2022
- Vítor Coelho de Almeida (1899–1987), Professed Priest of the Redemptorists (Minas Gerais – São Paulo, Brazil)
  - Declared "Venerable": August 5, 2022
- Franz de Castro Holzwarth (1942–1981), Layperson of the Diocese of São José dos Campos; Offering of life (Rio de Janeiro – São Paulo, Brazil)
  - Declared "Venerable": December 17, 2022
- Aloísio Sebastião Boeing (1913–2006), Professed Priest of the Congregation of the Sacred Heart of Jesus (Dehonians); Founder of the Marian Fraternity of the Sacred Heart of Jesus (Brazil)
  - Declared "Venerable": February 23, 2023
- Maria Luiza Rezende Marques [Tereza Margarida of the Heart of Mary] (1915–2005), Professed Religious of the Discalced Carmelite Nuns (Minas Gerais, Brazil)
  - Declared "Venerable": May 20, 2023
- Guido Vidal França Schäffer (1974–2009), Seminarian of the Archdiocese of São Sebastião do Rio de Janeiro (Rio de Janeiro, Brazil)
  - Declared "Venerable": May 20, 2023
- Antônio de Almeida Lustosa (1886–1974), Professed Priest of the Salesians of Don Bosco; Archbishop of Fortaleza (Minas Gerais – Pernambuco, Brazil)
  - Declared "Venerable": June 22, 2023
- Alberto Beretta (1916–2001), Professed Religious of Capuchin (Lombardia, Italy)
  - Declared "Venerable": December 14, 2023
- Libério Rodrigues Moreira (1884–1980), Professed Priest of the Diocese of Divinópolis (Minas Gerais, Brazil)
  - Declared "Venerable": March 14, 2024
- Vicenta Guilarte Alonso [Ildefonsa] (1879–1960), Professed Religious of the Daughters of Jesus (Burgos, Spain – Minas Gerais, Brazil)
  - Declared "Venerable": June 20, 2024
- José Antônio de Maria Ibiapina (1806–1883), Professed Priest of the Diocese of Guarabira (Ceará – Paraíba, Brazil)
  - Declared "Venerable": March 28, 2025
- John Pozzobon (1904–1985), Married Permanent Deacon of the Diocese of Santa Maria; Member of the Schonstatt Movement (Rio Grande do Sul, Brazil)
  - Declared "Venerable": June 20, 2025
- Angelo Angioni (1915–2008), Professed Monsegnior of the Diocese of São José do Rio Preto (Nuoro, Italy – São Paulo, Brazil)
  - Declared "Venerable": October 24, 2025
- Maria de Lourdes Guarda (1926–1996), Laywoman of the Diocese of Jundiaí (São Paulo, Brazil)
  - Declared "Venerable": November 21, 2025
- Maria Giselda Villela [Maria Imaculada of the Holy Trinity] (1909–1988), Professed Religious of the Discalced Carmelite Nuns (Minas Gerais, Brazil)
  - Declared "Venerable": January 22, 2026
- Julius Aemilius de Lombaerde (1878–1944), Professed Priest of the Missionaries of the Holy Family; Founder of the Missionaries of Our Lady of the Blessed Sacrament, the Daughters of the Immaculate Heart of Mary, and the Sisters of Our Lady of the Blessed Sacrament (Kortrijk, Belgium – Minas Gerais, Brazil)
  - Declared "Venerable": June 18, 2026

== Servants of God ==
- Pero Dias and 11 companions (d. 1571), Religious Professed Jesuits (2 priests and 10 consecrated religious); Martyrs (3 Portuguese and 9 Spaniards on board from the Canary Islands to Brazil)
- Vitória Nabo Correia Bixarxe [Vitória of the Incarnation] (1661–1715), Professed Religious of the Poor Clare Nuns; Mystic (Bahia, Brazil)
- Sepe Tiaraju (1723–1756), Layperson of the Diocese of Bagé; Martyr (Rio Grande do Sul, Brazil)
- Antonio Gonçalves de Oliveira [Vital Maria] (1844–1878), Professed Priest of the Franciscan Capuchins; Archbishop of Olinda-Recife (Pernambuco, Brazil – Paris, France)
- João Maria Cavalcanti de Brito (1848–1905), Professed Priest of the Archdiocese of Natal (Rio Grande do Norte, Brazil)
- Jerônimo de Castro Abreu Magalhães (1851–1909), Married Layperson of the Archdiocese of Sao Sebastiao do Rio de Janeiro (Rio de Janeiro, Brazil)
- Bento Dias Pacheco (1819–1911), Professed Priest of the Diocese of Jundiai (São Paulo, Brazil)
- Zelia Pedreira Abreu Magalhaes [Maria of the Blessed Sacrament] (1857–1919), Widow; Professed Religious of the Servants of the Blessed Sacrament (Rio de Janeiro, Brazil)
- Domingos Evangelista Pinheiro (1843–1924), Professed Monsegnior of the Archdiocese of Belo Horizonte; Founder of the Sisters Helpers of Our Lady of Pieta (Minas Gerais, Brazil)
- Antônio da Rocha Marmo [Antoninho] (1918–1930), Child Layperson of the Archdiocese of São Paulo (São Paulo, Brazil)
- José Silvério Horta (1859–1933), Professed Priest of the Archdiocese of Mariana (Minas Gerais, Brazil)
- Cícero Romão Batista (1844–1934), Professed Priest of the Archdiocese of Fortaleza (Ceará, Brazil)
- Domingos Chohachi Nakamura (1865–1940), Professed Priest of the Diocese of Presidente Prudente (Nagasaki, Japan – São Paulo, Brazil)
- Ignacio Martínez Madrid [Ignacio of the Blessed Sacrament] (1902–1942), Professed Monsegnior of the Augustinian Recollects; Apostolic Administrator of Labrea (Burgos, Spain – Amazonas, Brazil)
- Ambrósia Ana Sabatovycz (1894–1943), Professed Religious of the Sisters Servants of Mary Immaculate (Ukrainian Greek Catholic Rite) (Zhovkva Raion, Ukraine – Santa Catarina, Brazil)
- Giuseppe Calvi (1901–1943), Professed Priest of the Oblates of Saint Joseph (Cuneo, Italy – Paraná, Brazil)
- Luiz Gonzaga do Monte (1905–1944), Professed Priest of the Archdiocese of Natal (Pernambuco – Rio Grande do Norte, Brazil)
- Marciano Bernardes da Fonseca (1859–1946), Professed Monsegnior of the Archdiocese of Juiz de Fora (Minas Gerais, Brazil)
- Johann Baptist Reus (1868–1947), Professed Priest of the Jesuits (Bayreuth, Germany – Rio Grande do Sul, Brazil)
- Antonia Martins de Macedo (Cecília of the Heart of Mary) (1852–1950), Founder of the Franciscan Sisters of the Heart of Mary (São Paulo, Brazil)
- Anatólia Tecla Bodnar (1884–1956), Professed Religious of the Sisters Servants of Mary Immaculate (Ukrainian Greek Catholic Rite) (Galicia, Ukraine – Paraná, Brazil)
- Francisco Expedito Lopes (1914–1957), Bishop of Diocese of Garanhuns; Martyr (Ceará – Pernambuco, Brazil)
- Inocêncio López Santamaría (1874–1958), Professed Priest of the Mercedarians; Bishop of Sao Raimundo Nonato (Spain-Brazil)
- Honorina de Abreu [Maria José of Jesus] (1882–1959), Professed Carmelite Religious (Rio de Janeiro, Brazil)
- Humbertus Linden Jr. [Bruno] (1876–1960), Professed Priest of the Franciscan Friars Minor (Düsseldorf, Germany – Santa Catarina, Brazil)
- Lafayette da Costa Coelho (1886–1961), Professed Canon of the Diocese of Guanhães (Minas Gerais, Brazil)
- João dal Monte [Inacio] (1897–1963), Professed Priest of the Franciscan Capuchins; Bishop of Guaxupé (São Paulo – Minas Gerais, Brazil)
- Pedro Luís Maria Galibert (1877–1965), Bishop Emeritus of the Diocese of São Luiz de Cáceres (Tarn, France)
- Francisca Benicia Oliveira [Clemência] (1896–1966), Professed Religious of the Daughters of Charity of Saint Vincent de Paul (Ceará, Brazil)
- Alberto Fuger (1892–1970), Professed Priest of the Diocese of Oliveira (Bas-Rhin, France – Minas Gerais, Brazil)
- Petrus Canisius van Herkhuizen [Matheus] (1915–1973), Professed Priest of the Assumptionists (Nijmegen, Netherlands – São Paulo, Brazil)
- Antonio Machi [Gabriele of Frazzanò] (1907–1973), Professed Priest of the Franciscan Capuchins (Messina, Italy – Minas Gerais, Brazil)
- Maria Joanna Laselva [Maria de Lourdes of Saint Rose] (1910–1974), Professed Religious of the Order of the Immaculate Conception (Conceptionist Nuns) (Bari, Italy – São Paulo, Brazil)
- Rudolf Lunkenbein (1939–1976), Professed Priest of the Salesians of Don Bosco; Martyr (Lichtenfels, Germany – Mato Grosso, Brazil)
- Simão Cristino Koge Kudugodu [Simão Bororo] (1937–1976), Layperson of the Diocese of Barra do Garças; Martyr (Mato Grosso, Brazil)
- Lucia Eleonora Schiavinato (1990–1976), Consecrated laywoman; Missionary; Founder of the Secular Institute "Piccoli Rifugi" (Veneto, Italy)
- Alderigi Maria Torriani (1895–1977), Professed Monsegnior of the Archdiocese of Pouso Alegre (Minas Gerais, Brazil)
- Maria Milito [Leônia] (1913–1980), Founder of the Missionary Sisters of Saint Anthony Mary Claret (Salerno, Italy – Parana, Brazil)
- Gabriel Paulino Bueno Couto (1910–1982), Professed Priest of the Carmelites of the Ancient Observance; Bishop of Jundiaí (São Paulo, Brazil)
- Eliseu Maria Coroli (1900–1982), Professed Priest of the Barnabites; Bishop of Guamá; Founder of the Missionaries of Saint Therese (Piacenza, Italy – Pará, Brazil)
- Othon Motta (1913–1985), Bishop of Campanha (Rio de Janeiro – Minas Gerais, Brazil)
- Joaquim Arnóbio de Andrade (1915–1985), Professed Monsegnior of the Diocese of Sobral (Ceará, Brazil)
- Adelaide Molinari (1938–1985), Professed Religious of the Daughters of Divine Charity (Rio Grande do Sul – Pará, Brazil)
- Cleusa Carolina Rody Coelho (Maria Anjos of Saint Joseph) (1933–1985), Professed Religious of the Augustinian Recollect Missionary Sisters; Martyr (Espírito Santo – Amazonas, Brazil)
- Ezechiele Ramin (1953–1985), Professed Priest of the Comboni Missionaries of the Heart of Jesus; Martyr (Padua, Italy – Mato Grosso, Brazil)
- Alain Marie du Noday (1899–1985), Professed Priest of the Dominicans; Bishop of Porto Nacional (Morbihan, France – Tocantins, Brazil)
- João Benvegnú (1907–1986), Professed Monsegnior of the Dioces of Passo Fundo (Rio Grande do Sul, Brazil)
- Luso de Barros Matos (1901–1987), Professed Priest of the Diocese of Porto Nacional (Tocantins, Brazil)
- Maria de Lourdes Benedicta Nogueira Fontão [Lourdinha] (1930–1988), Married Laywoman of the Diocese of Sao Joao da Boa Vista (São Paulo, Brazil)
- Antônio Campelo de Aragão (1904-1988), Professed Priest of the Salesians of Don Bosco; Bishop of Petrolina (Pernambuco, Brazil)
- José Carlos Parra Pires (1954–1990), Professed Priest of the Diocese of Umuarama (Paraná, Brazil)
- José Gumercindo Santos (1907–1991), Professed Priest and Founder of the Society of "Joseleitos" of Christ; Founder of the Congregation of Saint Therese and the Congregation of the Divine Master (Sergipe – Bahia, Brazil)
- Rosita Paiva (1909–1991), Cofounder of the Josephite Institute (Amazonas – Ceará, Brazil)
- Tomas Vaquero (1914–1992), Bishop of São João da Boa Vista (São Paulo, Brazil)
- Angelo Possidio Caru [Angelo of Jesus Crucified] (1925–1995), Professed Priest of the Discalced Augustinians (Varese, Italy – Toledo, Spain)
- Angelo Frosi (1924–1995), Professed Priest of the Xaverian Missionaries; Bishop of the Abaetetuba (Cremona, Italy – Pará, Brazil)
- Michelangelo Pigotti (1916–1995), Professed Religious of the Franciscan Capuchins (Ancona, Italy – Amazonas, Brazil)
- José Antônio do Couto (1927–1997), Professed Religious of the Congregation of the Sacred Heart of Jesus (Dehonians); Bishop of Taubaté (Minas Gerais – São Paulo, Brazil)
- Floripes Dornellas de Jesus [Lola] (1913–1999), Laywoman of the Archdiocese of Mariana; Mystic (Minas Gerais, Brazil)
- Hélder Pessoa Câmara (1909–1999), Archbishop of Olinda-Recife (Ceará – Pernambuco, Brazil)
- Luigia Calliari [Ginetta] (1918–2001), Laywoman of the Diocese of Osasco; Consecrated Member of the Focolare Movement (Trent, Italy – São Paulo, Brazil)
- Waldir Lopes de Castro (1931–2001), Professed Monsegnior of the Diocese of Sobral (Ceará, Brazil)
- Gilberto Maria Delfina (1925–2004), Professed Priest and Founder of Fraternity Jesus the Savior (Salvists) (São Paulo, Brazil)
- Luciano Pedro Mendes de Almeida (1930–2006), Professed Priest of the Jesuits; Archbishop of Mariana (Rio de Janeiro – São Paulo, Brazil)
- Léo Tarcísio Gonçalves Pereira (1961–2007), Professed Priest of the Sacred Heart of Jesus (Dehonians); Founder of the "Bethânia" Community (Minas Gerais – São Paulo, Brazil)
- Marcelo Henrique Câmara [Marcelinho] (1979–2008), Layperson of the Personal Prelature of the Holy Cross and Opus Dei (Santa Catarina, Brazil)
- Pedro Balzi (1926–2009), Professed Priest of the Diocese of Bergamo; Member of the Missionary Community of Paradiso; Fidei Donum missionary in the Archdiocese of Teresina (Lausanne, Switzerland – Piauí, Brazil)
- André Bortolameotti (1919–2010), Professed Priest of the Congregation of Jesus the Priest (Trentino, Italy – São Paulo, Brazil)
- Luís Cecchin (1924–2010), Professed Priest of the Diocese of Nazaré (Veneto, Italy)
- Cesare Sarafini [Michelangelo of Cingoli] (1908–2013), Professed Priest of the Franciscan Capuchins (Macerata, Italy – Sergipe, Brazil)
- Maria da Luz Teixeira de Carvalho [Adélia] (1922–2013), Professed Religious of Christian Instruction; Marian Seer (Pernambuco, Brazil)
- Paolino Maria Baldassari (1926–2016), Professed Priest of the Servites (Bologna, Italy – Acre, Brazil)
- Nemésio Bernardi (1927–2016), Professed Priest of the Capuchins (Rio Grande do Sul, Brazil – Rio de Janeiro, Brazil)

== See also ==
- Our Lady of Aparecida
- Roman Catholicism in Brazil
- List of Catholic saints from Brazil
- List of American saints and beatified people
- List of Canadian Roman Catholic saints
- List of Argentine saints
- List of Mexican Saints
- List of South American Saints
- List of saints of the Canary Islands
- List of Scandinavian saints
