= Panacea De' Muzzi =

14th-century Italian martyr

Blessed Panacea De' Muzzi
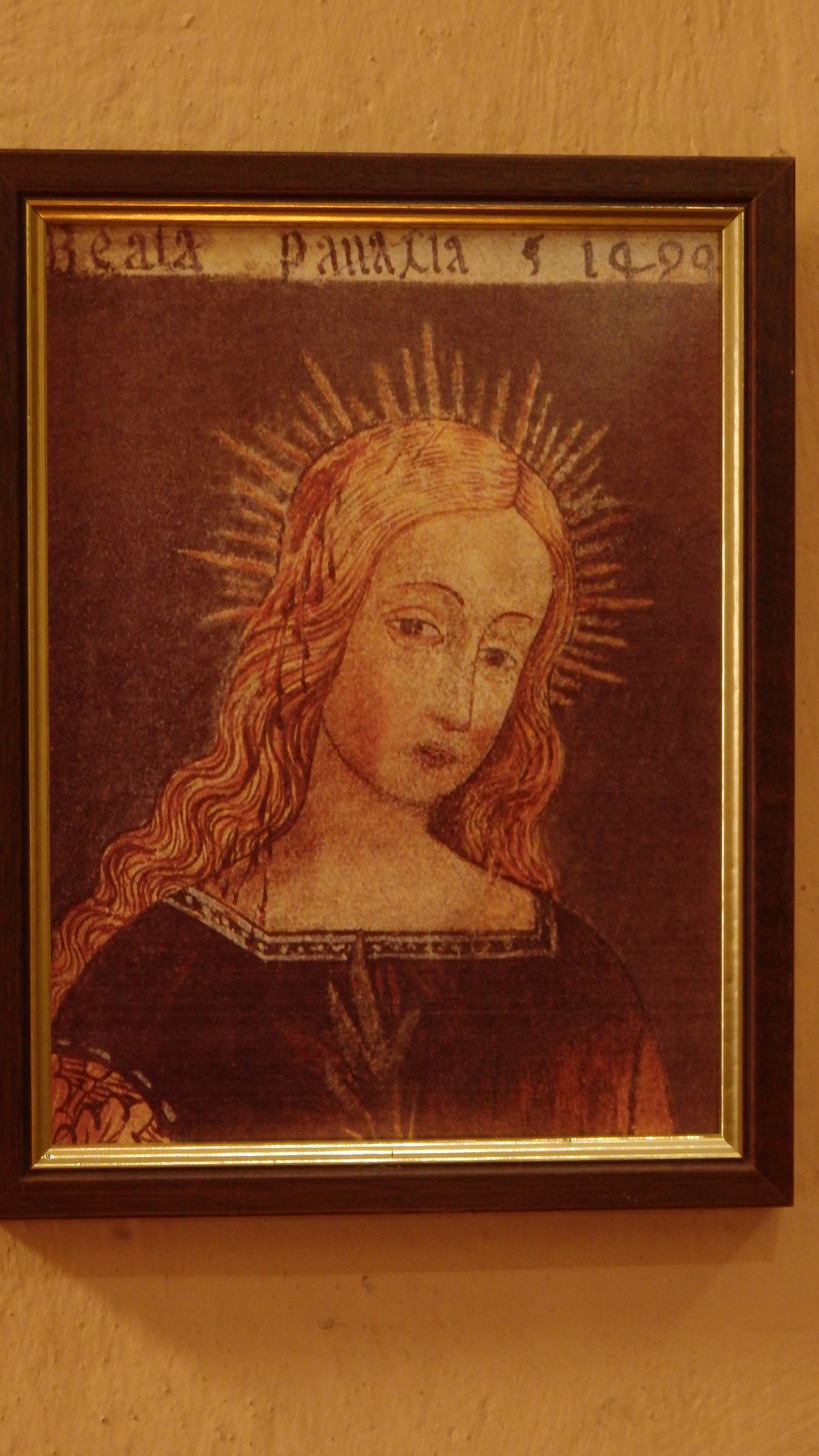
- Beata Panacea
- Born: 1368; Quarona, Italy
- Died: 1383; Quarona, Italy
- Venerated in: Roman Catholic Church
- Beatified: 1867
- Feast: 27 March

Panacea De' Muzzi (1368–1383) was a young girl martyred at the age of fifteen who was beatified.

== Biography ==
Panacea was born in Quarona in 1368, to Lorenzo and Maria Gambino Muzio. With the sudden death of her mother, her father felt his daughter needed a mother and married a woman named Margherita, from Locarno Sesia. She was a widow and mother of one daughter. After the remarriage of her father, Panacea, always devoted to good deeds and care for the sick, began to suffer mistreatment and harassment from the new relatives. It is possible that her charitable activities drew her away from her chores. As described in detail by the most recent biographers, the girl was subjected to the most menial jobs. On one occasion, her father found her badly beaten, but apparently did nothing to intervene.

A spring evening of 1383, Panacea, at the time she was fifteen years old, was far away from home to look after the sheep; her stepmother, not seeing her arrive, went to look for her. She went to the pastures on Mount Tucri overlooking the village and found the girl in prayer in the ancient hermitage of San Giovanni. Furious, Margherita scolded her severely and in the throes of a moment of fury beat Panacea, killing her. Realizing what she had done, Margherita threw herself in despair into a nearby ravine.

The news spread quickly, and Panacea's body was taken to Ghemme and buried next to her mother in the cemetery adjacent to the Church of Santa Maria.

== Cult ==
The cult of Panacea was widespread since the beginning of the fifteenth century, mainly in the local area, getting confirmation from the Catholic Church only in 1867. At the beginning of the fifteenth century were built as early as two oratories dedicated to her, one at the place where she died. The centre of devotion to Panacea is the church in Ghemme, where her body now lies in a glass case, in the crypt designed by the architect Alessandro Antonelli. It remains a place of pilgrimage, particularly on the first Friday in May, especially by pilgrims from Ravenna.

Panacea is the patroness of Valsesia. In the diocese of Novara, her feast day is May 5.
