= Catherine of Vadstena =

Swedish noblewoman and saint (c.1332–1381)

Saint Catherine of Sweden
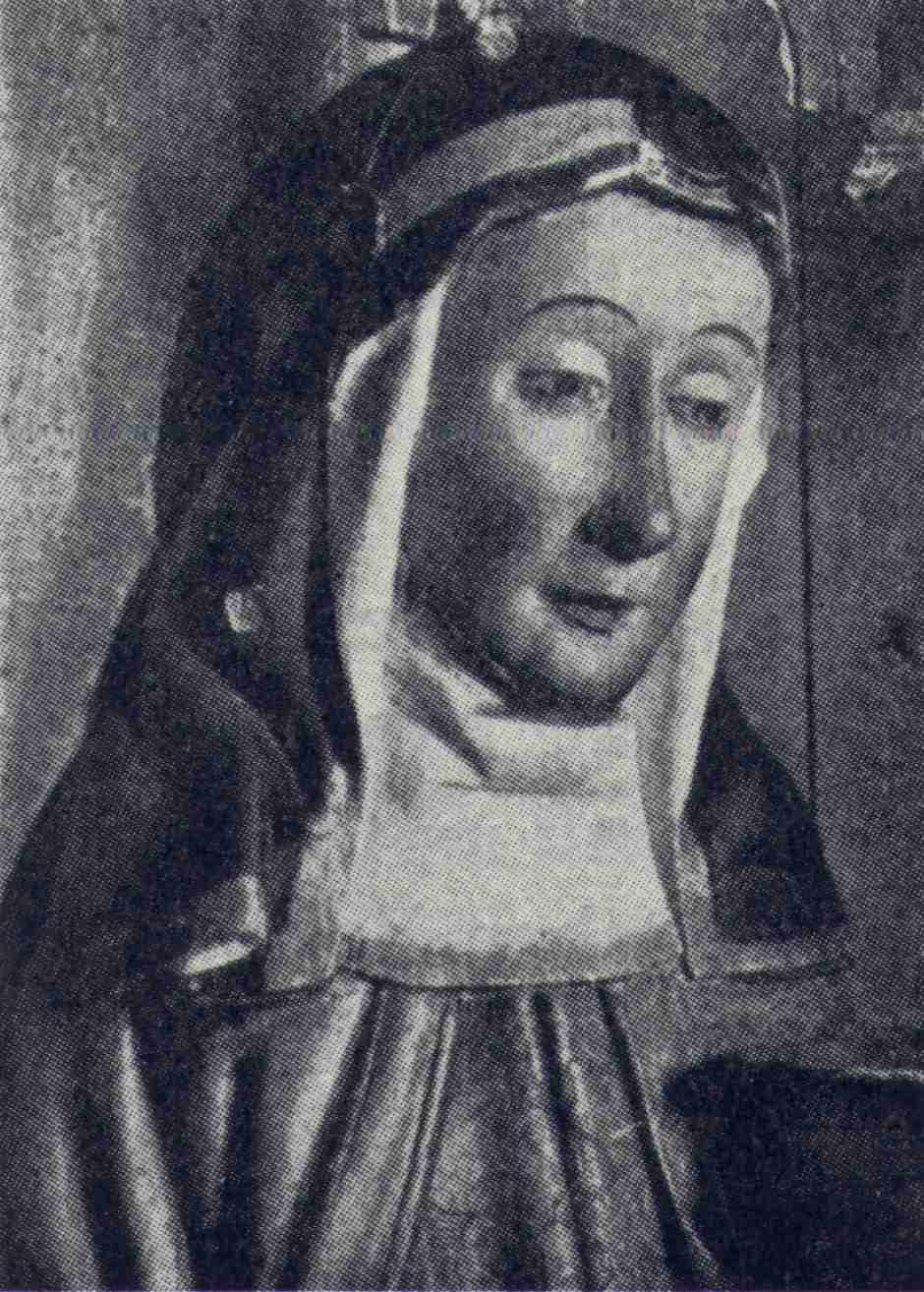
- Saint Catherine in Trönö Old Church
- Born: 1331 or 1332
- Died: 24 March 1381
- Venerated in: Roman Catholic Church; Church of Sweden (Evangelical-Lutheran)
- Canonized: 1484 (cultus confirmed) by Innocent VIII
- Feast: 24 March (Roman Catholic Church); 2 August (Church of Sweden)
- Attributes: A hind at her side
- Patronage: Women who suffer miscarriage

Catherine of Sweden, Katarina av Vadstena, Catherine of Vadstena or Katarina Ulfsdotter (c. 1332 – 24 March 1381) was a Swedish noblewoman. She is venerated as a saint in the Evangelical Lutheran Churches and in the Roman Catholic Church. Her father was Ulf Gudmarsson, Lord of Ulvåsa, and her mother was Saint Bridget of Sweden (known as Birgitta Birgersdotter of Finsta in her lifetime).

== Life ==
At the age of twelve or thirteen she married Lord Eggert van Kyren, a religious young nobleman of German descent, whom she persuaded to take a vow of absolute chastity, and both lived in a state of virginity. Catherine accompanied her mother to Rome in 1349 and soon upon arrival heard news of her husband's death.

She stayed on with her mother, accompanied her on several journeys, including one to the Holy Land. At the death of Bridget, Catherine returned to Sweden with her mother's body, which was buried at the monastery of Vadstena. Catherine became head of the Brigittine convent at Vadstena Abbey, founded by her mother. Catherine took on the task of forming the community in the rule her mother had written and directing the Order of the Holy Savior, or Bridgettines. Later, she returned to Rome to work for her mother's canonization. She stayed there five years and formed a close friendship with Catherine of Siena. She was spurred by a vision to visit the Holy Land in 1372, and she died soon after her return to Rome.

== Sainthood ==
In 1484, Pope Innocent VIII gave permission for Catherine's veneration as a saint and her feast was assigned to 22 March in the Roman Martyrology. Catherine is generally represented with a hind (female red deer) at her side, which is said to have come to her aid "when unchaste youths sought to ensnare her".

In 1488, Pope Innocent VIII gave permission for the translation of her relics in Vadstena. The formal beatification and canonization process, which also documented the required miracles, was never completed because of the Protestant Reformation.

In the Church of Sweden, the feast of St. Catherine (Katarinamäss) is celebrated on 2 August.

== See also ==
- List of Swedish saints
