= List of Catholic saints from Oceania =

The Catholic Church recognizes some deceased Catholics as saints, blesseds, venerables, and Servants of God. Some of these people were born, died, or lived their religious life in any of the states or territories of Oceania. The region of Oceania was the last continent where the Catholic Church arrived. Consequently, it is the continent with the fewest Catholic saints.

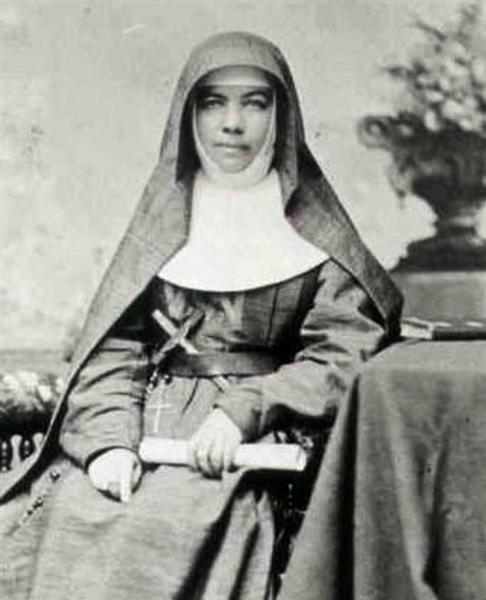
Mother Mary of the Cross (Mary MacKillop), the first saint from Australia.

== List of saints ==
The following is the list of saints, including the year in which they were canonized and the country or countries with which they are associated.

- Peter Chanel, Marist priest (1954, Wallis and Futuna)
- Father Damien, priest of the Congregation of the Sacred Hearts of Jesus and Mary (2009, Hawaii)
- Mary MacKillop, founder of the Sisters of St Joseph of the Sacred Heart (2010, Australia)
- Pedro Calungsod, layman (2012, Guam)
- Marianne Cope, Franciscan sister (2012, Hawaii)
- Peter To Rot, layman (Papua New Guinea)

== List of blesseds ==
- Diego Luis de San Vitores, Jesuit priest (Guam)
- Giovanni Battista Mazzucconi, PIME priest (Papua New Guinea)

== List of venerables ==
- Suzanne Aubert, religious (New Zealand)
- Alain-Marie Guynot de Boismenu, bishop with the Sacred Heart Missionaries (Papua New Guinea)

== Other open causes ==
Others have been proposed for beatification, and may have active groups supporting their causes. These include:

- Leopoldina Burns
- Eileen O'Connor
- B. A. Santamaria
- Martyrs during World War II, including:
  - Sister Teresia, a sister from Papua New Guinea with the Daughters of Mary Immaculate who died in 1946 as a result of torture by the Japanese occupiers.
  - Sister Cicilia and ten other native Marianist sisters who died in service during the Japanese occupation in air raids, POW camps, or otherwise.
  - Magdalena Aiwaul, a native from Tumleo Island who wished to join the Missionary Sisters Servants of the Holy Spirit and was shot aboard the Japanese destroyer Akikaze after being arrested with the Sisters.
  - Bishop Joseph Loerks (or Lörks), German Vicar Apostolic of Central New Guinea (now the Diocese of Wewak), also shot aboard the Japanese destroyer Akikaze.
  - Forty-six or more others, companions of the above, also shot aboard the Japanese destroyer Akikaze.
  - Charlie, Allan and Dora Mathies; Jimi Johnson; Elsie Kraemer; Paula; and two unnamed teenagers, laypeople working at the missions of Papua New Guinea killed aboard the Yorishime Maru.
  - Arthur C. Duhamel, Marist, killed on Guadalcanal.
  - James Gerard Hennessey, killed aboard the Montevideo Maru.
  - Marist brothers Augustine (Frederick Gerard Mannes), Donatus and Ervin, missing during the occupation of the Solomon Islands.
  - Vernon Francis Douglas, a New Zealand Columban priest killed by Japanese soldiers in 1943 in the Philippines having demonstrated outstanding priestly fidelity (especially to the Seal of Confession).

== See also ==
- Catholic Church in Australia
- Catholic Church in New Zealand
- Catholic Church in Papua New Guinea
- Catholic Church in Guam
- Diocese of Honolulu
- Catholic Church in Wallis and Futuna
- List of American saints and beatified people
- List of saints of the Canary Islands
