= Nebridius (bishop of Egara) =

Saint Nebridius
- Venerated in: Roman Catholic Church, Eastern Orthodox Church

Saint Nebridius (Catalan: Nebridi, Spanish: Nebridio) was bishop of Egara (Terrassa) (516–527) and then bishop of Barcelona from 540 to around 547 AD. His feast day falls on 9 February. A native of Girona, Nebridius, according to tradition, had three brothers who were also saints. They were Saint Justus, bishop of Urgell; Saint Elpidius; and Saint Justinian. He was very learned and wrote interpretations of the Scriptures. He also wrote a work called In cantica canticorum about the church chants. He was a Benedictine.
