= Ezechiele Ramin =

Italian martyr (1953–1985)

Servant of God Ezechiele Ramin MCCJ
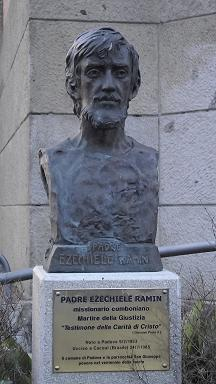
- Bronze sculpture of Father Ezechiele Ramin in Piazza San Giuseppe (Padua); work by Ettore Greco (2005).
- Born: February 9, 1953; Padua, Italy
- Died: July 24, 1985 (aged 32); Ji-Paraná, Rondônia, Brazil
- Other names: Lele; Ezequiel
- Education: Studio Teologico Fiorentino (Florence, Italy); Archdiocese of Milan seminar (Venegono Inferiore, Italy); Catholic Theological Union (Chicago, Illinois, US)
- Church: Roman Catholic
- Ordained: September 28, 1980

Ezechiele "Lele" Ramin, MCCJ (Brazilian Portuguese: Ezequiel; 9 February 1953 – 24 July 1985) was an Italian Comboni missionary and artist. He was described as a martyr of charity by Pope John Paul II after his murder in Brazil while defending the rights of the farmers and the Suruí natives of the Rondônia area against local landowners. His cause for beatification was opened in 2016, granting him the title of a Servant of God.

== Life ==
Ezechiele Ramin was born in Padua (in the Veneto region of Italy) in 1953, the fourth of six sons in a modest family. He studied at a Liceo classico in a Catholic school (Collegio Vescovile Gregorio Barbarigo) where he became aware of the poverty widespread throughout the world. This pushed him to join the charity Mani Tese ("Outstretched Hands"), organising several camps to collect funds in order to support small projects related to the association.

In 1972, he decided to join the religious institute of the Comboni Missionaries of the Heart of Jesus; his studies brought him to move first to Florence, then to Venegono Inferiore (in the Province of Varese) and finally to Chicago, where he graduated from Catholic Theological Union and served in the St. Ludmila Parish. After having experienced missionary work with impoverished Native Americans in South Dakota and later, for one year, in Baja California (Mexico), he was ordained a priest on September 28, 1980 in his native Padua. He was assigned to a parish in Naples but, following the 1980 Irpinia earthquake, he moved to San Mango sul Calore to assist the victims; he returned to Naples in 1981 where he organised one of the first pacific demonstrations against camorra. The following year he moved to Troia in Apulia, where he acted as a focal point for vocational groups.

=== Cacoal ===
In 1984, he was assigned to Cacoal, in Rondônia (Brazil). On January 20, 1984 he moved to Brasília, where he underwent further education in pastoral care, and finally reached Rondônia in July of that year.

He seemed wary of the situation in Cacoal, but accepted his assignment with the words "If Christ needs me, how can I refuse?"

There he encountered a difficult situation: the many small farmers of the area were oppressed, through both legal and illegal actions, by the local landowners. Also, the indigenous Suruí tribes had only recently been forced to become sedentary by being allocated land by the Brazilian government and were growing restless.

Inspired by the teachings of Dietrich Bonhoeffer, he put himself to the front in their struggle for justice, trying to lead them to a pacifistic protest rather than to start an armed revolution.

The situation he was in brought him to fear for his life. In early 1985 he was threatened with being killed; in many of the letters he wrote to his family in that year he wonders if he will ever see them again.

== Death and aftermath ==
On July 24, 1985, Ramin, alongside the local trade union leader Adilio de Souza, chaired a meeting in Fazenda Catuva in Ji-Paraná, in the nearby state of Rondônia, trying to persuade the small farmers employed there to avoid taking arms against the landowners, going against a request of caution issued by his superiors. On his way back with de Souza, at midday, he was attacked by seven pistoleros (hired gunmen) who shot him more than 50 times. Before dying, he whispered the words "I forgive you". As Ramin's body couldn't be recovered by his fellow missionaries for about 24 hours after his death, a group of Suruí indios kept vigil until their arrival.

He was buried in the Padua Cemetery.

Some days after the event Pope John Paul II declared Ramin a "martyr of charity".

Ivo Lorscheiter, the then-President of CNBB (the National Conference of Brazilian Bishops), took inspiration from Ramin's murder to urge the Brazilian society to work towards a deep "structural change".

The reaction to Ramin's murder by the local farmers went against his teachings: in November of the same year a landowner and his general manager were killed by the same people Ramin had been trying to help, and some days later another farm manager was shot.

In 1988, two of the men who shot Ramin – Deuzelio Goncalves Fraga and Altamiro Flauzino – were condemned to respectively 24 and 25 years' imprisonment by the Cuiabá tribunal. Others have not been identified nor arrested.

Some years after Ramin's death another Comboni priest from Padua, Pietro Settin, visited the area where Ramin was murdered, discovering that Adilio de Souza, the union leader who had been with Ramin on the day of his death, had become the owner of a piece of land. Settin theorized that he might have received it in exchange for betraying Ramin.

== Other activities ==
Ezechiele Ramin's main hobbies were cycling and playing football; he also wrote poetry. His numerous letters to his friends and family were collected and published in a volume edited by Ercole Ongaro and by Ramin's brother Fabiano, entitled Testimone della speranza – lettere dal 1971 al 1985 (Witness of Hope – Letters 1971 – 1985). Several of them (in Italian) are publicly available.

He also produced a considerable number of drawings, especially in charcoal, that were the subject of an exhibition held in 2010 in his native city of Padua, promoted by the local Comune (municipality) and organised by Maria Cristina Ferin, Federica Millozzi and Fabiano Ramin. Several of them had already been collected in a book and published.

He documented his experiences through photography.

== Tributes ==
Several initiatives in honour of Ezechiele Ramin are regularly held both in his native Padua and in Cacoal, mostly linked to promoting peaceful protest instead of armed revolution and to awakening the young people's awareness and interest in the missionary world.

In 2005 – the twentieth anniversary of his death – he was remembered by Padua Archbishop Antonio Mattiazzo in an initiative about modern martyrs; in the same year, a bronze sculpture by Ettore Grego in Ramin's memory was unveiled by Padua Mayor Flavio Zanonato in Piazza San Giuseppe, in front of the church Ramin used to frequent as a child and young man.

Also in 2005, Catholic Theological Union in Chicago, where Ramin studied, commissioned an icon bearing his image by the renowned icon painter Robert Lentz, who represented Ramin with a turtle dove to symbolise his belief in nonviolence. The presence of a halo around Ramin's head is, however, improper according to the Catholic iconography, as Ramin has not been officially recognised as a Saint. Lentz, though, has often added halos to icons representing martyrs not conventionally recognised as saints, such as Albert Einstein, César Chávez and Heȟáka Sápa (Black Elk).

In 2010 he and Sister Dorothy Stang were chosen by the Comboni missionaries in Brazil as symbols of the local people's struggle for land ownership.

Besides a collection of his letters to friends and family, three further books about Ramin's life have been published: Lele – creare primavera (Lele – Creating Spring), by Ezio Sorio, Lele vive (Lele Is Alive), by Paulo Lima (2005), and Ezechiele Ramin: la forza di una testimonianza (Ezechiele Ramin: the Strength of a Witness) by fellow Comboni missionary Giovanni Munari.

In 1998 RAI, the Italian national television network, commissioned La casa bruciata, a TV movie inspired by his life. It was directed by Massimo Spano with a soundtrack by Ennio Morricone and featured Giulio Scarpati.

In late 2011 a musical reading of selected passages from Ezechiele Ramin testimone della speranza. Lettere e scritti 1971 – 1985 was organized in Padova on Human Rights Day, with actor Andrea Pennacchi and the international "music collective" Luomodellazappa.

Two Italian Comuni named a street after "Padre Ezechiele Ramin": Padua, the city of his birth, and Rome.

Cadoneghe, in the province of Padua, dedicated an auditorium to him and Padua named a nursery school after him. Again in Padua, the non-profit association Angoli di Mondo (Corners of the World) opened a public information centre, the Centro di Documentazione Ezechiele Ramin.

The parish of Saint Richard of Andria in Andria (in Apulia) dedicated its meeting and recreation room to Ramin.

In Brazil, in Picos (Piauí), the Angoli di Mondo association supported the building and activation of a day care centre for street children that was named after Ramin.

== Beatification cause ==
The Comboni missionaries are advancing the cause for Ramin's martyrdom (and therefore his status as a beatified. Among the Comboni Missionary community in Latin America, it is said that "for them and the people who knew him, Ramin is already a saint". He is considered a "witness of the faith".
