= List of Swedish saints =

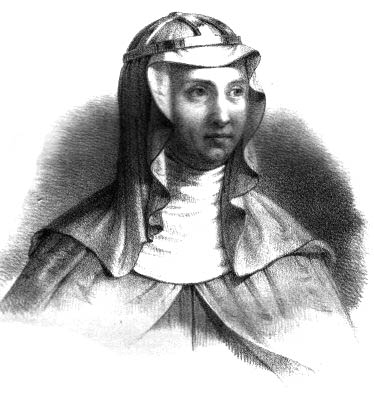
Bridget of Sweden (1303–1373), Patron Saint of Europe.

This list of Swedish saints includes all Christian saints with connections to Sweden, either because they were of Swedish origin and ethnicity or because they travelled to the Swedish people from their own homeland and became noted in their hagiography for their work. A few may have had no Swedish connection in their lifetime, but have nonetheless become associated with Sweden through the depositing of their relics in Swedish religious houses in the Middle Ages.

Like many European nations, a number of saints were connected to the Royal Family but, unusually, many Swedish saints were women.

Name	Floruit	Feast day	Notes
Ansgar	9th century	3 February	
Botvid	12th century	28 July	
Bridget of Sweden	14th century	23 July	a Patron Saint of Europe; mother of Saint Catherine of Vadstena
Brinolfo Algotsson	13th and 14 century	6 February	Bishop of Skara
Catherine of Vadstena	14th century	24 March	Daughter of Saint Birgitta (Bridget of Sweden)
David of Munktorp	11th century		Västmanland apostle
Elisabeth Hesselblad	20th century		
Eric IX of Sweden	12th century	18 May	
Eskil	11th century	12 June	Patron saint of Södermanland and Strängnäs.
Helena of Skövde	12th century	5 March	
Bishop Henry	12th century	19 January	Pre-congregational saint
Ingamoder	11th century		possibly legendary
Ingegerd Olofsdotter of Sweden	11th century	10 February	
Ingrid of Skänninge	13th century		
Kakwkylla	Late Middle Ages	10 March	Legendary
Olaf II of Norway			
Ragnhild of Tälje	12th century		Queen of Sweden
Sigfrid of Sweden	11th century	15 February	
Walpurga	8th century	25 February	

== Royal saints ==
Ingegerd, a daughter of King Olof Skötkonung of Sweden and Estrid, married Grand Prince Jaroslav of Novgorod and Kiev in 1019 and probably died in 1050. One or two years before her death, she became a nun under the strictest order and took the name Anna. Known as Saint Anna of Novgorod, she was canonized in 1439 and is celebrated as a saint in the Orthodox Church.

== See also ==
- List of Swedish clergymen
- List of Swedish people
- Name days in Sweden
- List of saints of the Canary Islands
- List of Scandinavian saints
