= List of Catholic saints of the Canary Islands =

Canarian venerated by the Catholic Church

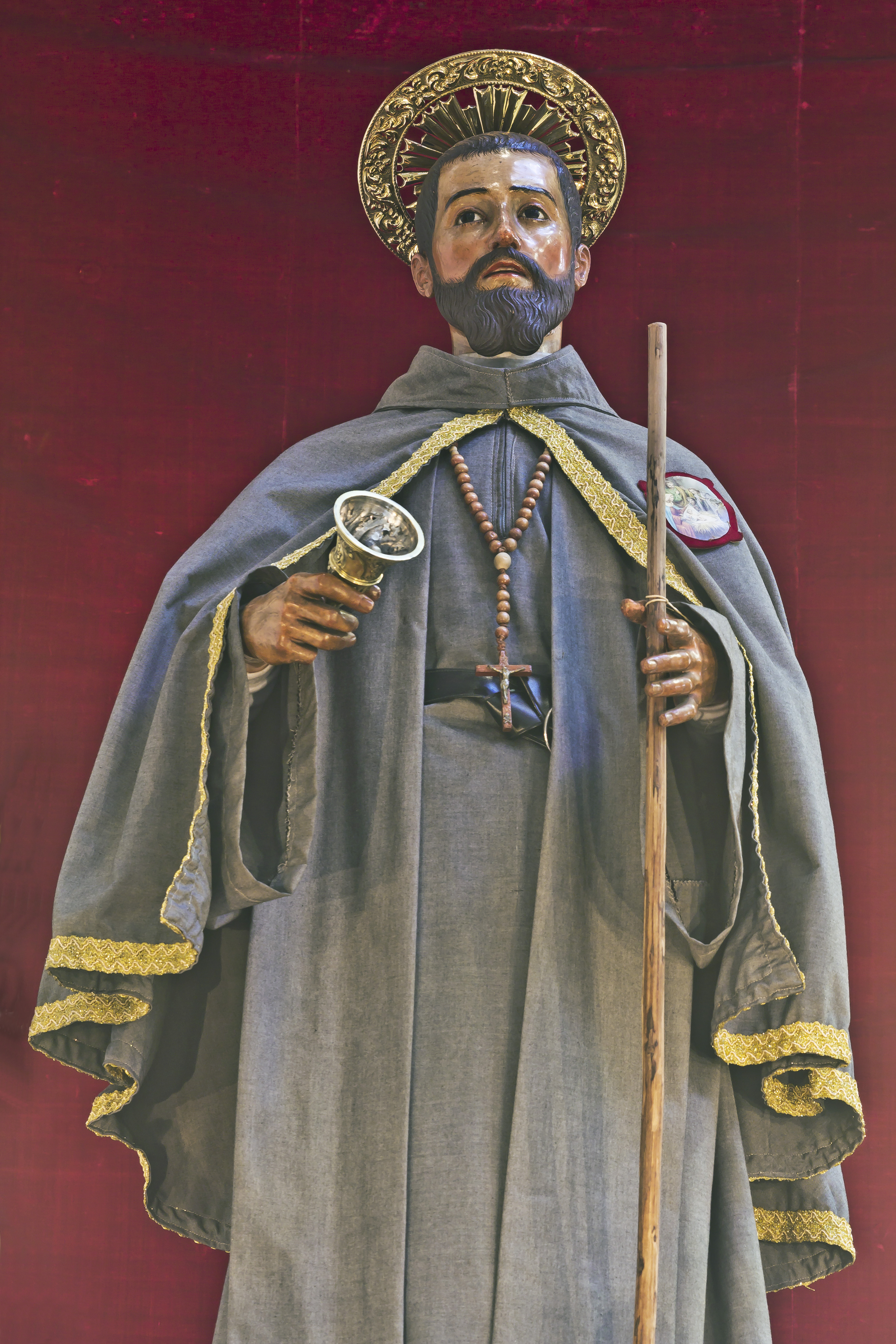
Peter of Saint Joseph de Betancur (popularly known as the Hermano Pedro) is the first native of the Canary Islands to be canonized by the Catholic Church.

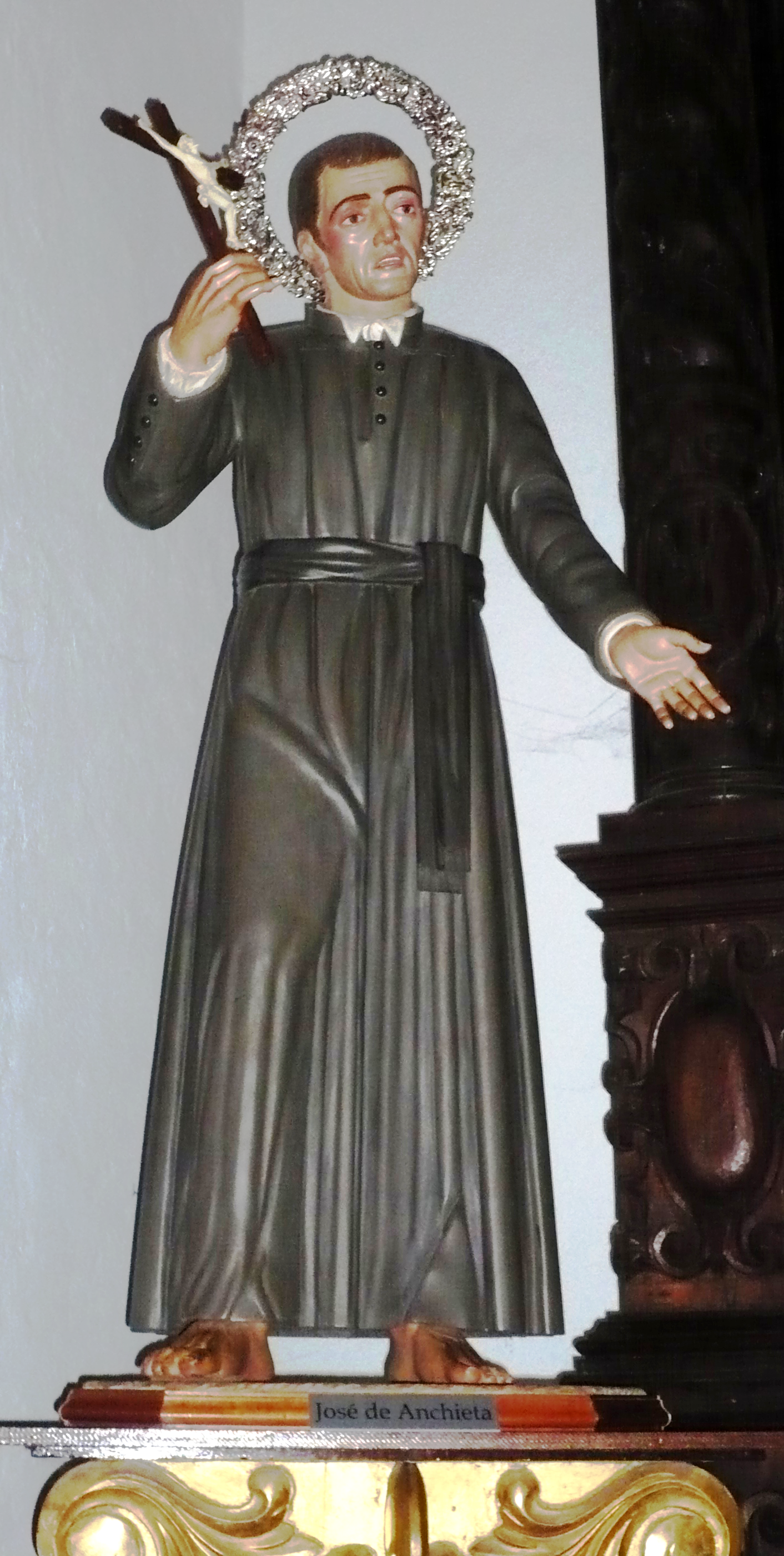
José de Anchieta (also called Padre Anchieta) is the second native saint of the Canary Islands.

This is a list of saints and blesseds of the Catholic Church associated with the Canary Islands, today an archipelago part of Spain. In addition, the list includes the venerable and servants of God born or linked to the archipelago.

- Saints
  - Peter of Saint Joseph de Betancur. Vilaflor (Tenerife) – (1626–1667). Franciscan missionary in Guatemala, founder of the Order of Bethlehemites and first saint of the Canary Islands. Canonized in 2002 by Pope John Paul II.
  - José de Anchieta. San Cristóbal de La Laguna (Tenerife) – (1534–1597). Jesuit priest and missionary in Brazil. Canonized in 2014 by Pope Francis.
- Blesseds
  - Martyrs of Tazacorte. Monks and missionaries captured and killed in 1570 by the French corsair Jacques de Sores off Fuencaliente Lighthouse, La Palma where they enjoy great veneration especially in Tazacorte. Although none of them were themselves born in the Canary Islands, they are included among the blessed of the archipelago. Beatified in 1854 by Pope Pius IX.
  - Sister Lorenza Díaz Bolaños. (Gran Canaria) – (1896–1939). Religious and martyr belonging to the Daughters of Charity of Saint Vincent de Paul. Beatified in 2013 by Pope Francis with nearly 500 martyrs of the Spanish Civil War.
  - Tomás Morales Morales. Carrizal de Ingenio (Gran Canaria) – (1907–1936). Dominican martyr. Beatified in 2022 by Pope Francis along with 26 other Dominicans shot in the Spanish Civil War.
  - José Torres Padilla. San Sebastián de La Gomera (La Gomera) – (1811–1878). Religious. Beatified in 2024 by Pope Francis.
- Venerable
  - Andrés Filomeno García Acosta. (Fuerteventura) – (1800–1853). Franciscan friar.
  - Antonio Vicente González Suárez. Agüimes (Gran Canaria) – (1817–1851). Religious.
  - José Marcos Figueroa. Tinajo (Lanzarote) – (1865–1942). Religious.
- Servants of God
  - Sister Mary of Jesus de León y Delgado. El Sauzal (Tenerife) – (1643–1731). Dominican nun and mystic.
  - Sister Catalina de San Mateo de La Concepción. Santa María de Guía (Gran Canaria) – (1648–1695). Franciscan religious and mystical.
  - Fray Juan de Jesús. (Tenerife) – (1615–1687). Franciscan friar and mystic.
  - Sister Petronila de San Esteban Montgruí y Covos. Las Palmas de Gran Canaria (Gran Canaria) – (1676–1759). Religious and mystic.
  - Sister María de San Antonio Lorenzo y Fuentes. Garachico (Tenerife) – (1665–1741). Dominican nun.
  - Buenaventura Codina y Augerolas. Hostalric (Gerona) – (1785–1857). Although he was not born in the Canary Islands, he was bishop of the Diocese Canariense.
  - Sister María Justa de Jesús. La Victoria de Acentejo (Tenerife) – (1667–1723). Franciscan nun and mystic.
  - José María Cueto y Díez de la Maza. Riocorvo (Cantabria) – (1839–1908). Although he was not born in the Canary Islands, he was bishop of the Diocese Canariense.
  - José María Suárez. Teror (Gran Canaria) – (1890–1936). Religious.

== See also ==
- Diocese Nivariense
- Diocese Canariense
- Saints of Catalonia
