= List of venerated Canadian Catholics =

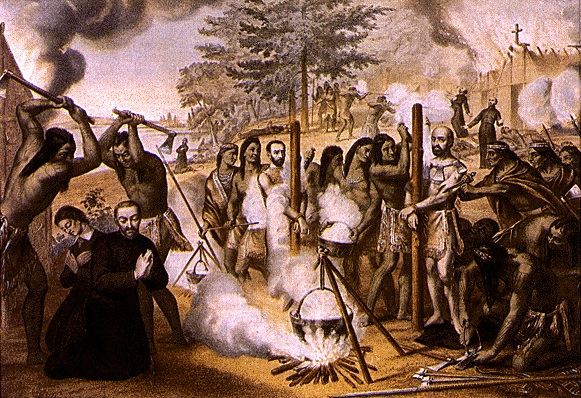
Canadian Martyrs who served as missionary of the Society of Jesus in North America

The history of the Catholic Church in Canada extends back to the arrival of the earliest European explorers. A French priest accompanied the explorer Jacques Cartier, performing the first ever recorded Holy Mass on Canadian soil on July 7, 1534, on the shores of the Gaspé Peninsula. It was followed by conversion of the First Nations into the fold of Catholicism. Soon after, more and more religious congregations set foot in Canada especially among French-speaking present-day Quebec.

In this long history of the Roman Catholic Church in Canada, a number of deceased persons of the Church have had their life and work declared worthy of achieving one of the four stages of canonization in the Catholic Church: Servants of God; Venerable; Beatification (Blessed); and, for some, full recognition as a Saint.

== Fondateurs ==
The list of Canadian Roman Catholic Saints (St.), Blesseds (Bl.) and Venerables (Ven.) includes six individuals called the Fondateurs, or Founders. These people are particularly venerated for establishing the Church in Canada. Generally, these are: St. Marguerite Bourgeoys, St. Marguerite d'Youville, St. François de Laval, St. Marie de l'Incarnation, Bl. Catherine de Saint-Augustin and Ven. Jeanne Mance. Sometimes, Ven. Jérôme Le Royer de la Dauversière is also included.

== Saints ==
- Martyrs of North America:
  - Jean de Brébeuf (1593–1649), Professed Priest of the Jesuits (Manche, France – Ontario, Canada)
  - Noël Chabanel (1613–1649), Professed Priest of the Jesuits (Haute-Loire, France – Ontario, Canada)
  - Antoine Daniel (1601–1648), Professed Priest of the Jesuits (Seine-Maritime, France – Ontario, Canada)
  - Charles Garnier (1605–1649), Professed Priest of the Jesuits (Paris, France – Ontario, Canada)
  - Isaac Jogues (1602–1646), Professed Priest of the Jesuits (Orléanais, France – New York, United States)
  - Gabriel Lallemant (Lalemant) (1610–1649), Professed Priest of the Jesuits (Paris, France – Ontario, Canada)
  - René Goupil (1607–1642), Professed Religious of the Jesuits (Maine-et-Loire, France – New York, United States)
  - Jean de Lalande (1620–1646), Professed Religious of the Jesuits (Seine-Maritime, France – New York, United States)
    - Beatified: June 21, 1925 by Pope Pius XI
    - Canonized: June 29, 1930 by Pope Pius XI
- Marguerite Bourgeoys (1620–1700), Founder of the Sisters of the Congregation of Notre Dame (Aube, France – Québec, Canada)
  - Declared "Venerable": June 19, 1910
  - Beatified: November 12, 1950 by Pope Pius XII
  - Canonized: October 31, 1982 by Pope John Paul II
- Marie-Marguerite d'Youville née Dufrost de Lajemmerais (1701–1771), Widow; Founder of the Sisters of Charity of Montréal (Gray Sisters) (Québec, Canada)
  - Declared "Venerable": March 3, 1955
  - Beatified: May 3, 1959 by Pope John XXIII
  - Canonized: December 9, 1990 by Pope John Paul II
- Alfred Bessette (André) (1845–1937), Professed Religious of the Congregation of Holy Cross (Québec, Canada)
  - Declared "Venerable": June 12, 1978
  - Beatified: May 23, 1982 by Pope John Paul II
  - Canonized: October 17, 2010 by Pope Benedict XVI
- Kateri Tekakwitha (c. 1656–1680), Young Layperson of the Archdiocese of Montréal (New York, United States – Québec, Canada)
  - Declared "Venerable": January 3, 1943
  - Beatified: June 22, 1980 by Pope John Paul II
  - Canonized: October 21, 2012 by Pope Benedict XVI
- Marie Guyart Martin (Marie of the Incarnation) (1599–1672), Widow; Professed Religious of the Ursuline Nuns (Indre-et-Loire, France – Québec, Canada)
  - Declared "Venerable": July 19, 1911
  - Beatified: June 22, 1980 by Pope John Paul II
  - Canonized (equipollent): April 3, 2014 by Pope Francis
- François de Montmorency-Laval (1623–1708), Bishop of Québec (Eure-et-Loir, France – Québec, Canada)
  - Declared "Venerable": February 28, 1960
  - Beatified: June 22, 1980 by Pope John Paul II
  - Canonized: April 3, 2014 by Pope Francis
- Marie-Léonie Paradis (Marie-Léonie) (1840–1912), Founder of the Little Sisters of the Holy Family (Québec, Canada)
  - Declared "Venerable": January 31, 1981
  - Beatified: September 11, 1984 by Pope John Paul II
  - Canonized: October 20, 2024 by Pope Francis

== Blesseds ==
- André Grasset de Saint-Sauveur (1758–1792), Priest of the Archdiocese of Sens (Québec, Canada – Paris, France)
  - Declared "Venerable": October 1, 1926
  - Beatified: October 17, 1926 by Pope Pius XI
- Eulalie Durocher (Marie-Rose) (1811–1849), Founder of the Sisters of the Holy Names of Jesus and Mary
  - Declared "Venerable": July 13, 1979
  - Beatified: May 23, 1982 by Pope John Paul II
- Louis-Zéphirin Moreau (1824–1901), Bishop of Saint-Hyacinthe; Cofounder of the Sisters of Saint Joseph of Saint-Hyacinthe (Québec, Canada)
  - Declared "Venerable": May 10, 1973
  - Beatified: May 10, 1987 by Pope John Paul II
- Frédéric Janssoone (1838–1916), Professed Priest of the Franciscan Friars Minor (Nord, France – Québec, Canada)
  - Declared "Venerable": March 21, 1985
  - Beatified: September 25, 1988 by Pope John Paul II
- Marie-Catherine Simon de Longpré (Marie-Catherine of Saint Augustine) (1632–1668), Professed Religious of the Augustinian Sisters of Mercy of Jesus (Canadian Federation) (Manche, France – Québec, Canada)
  - Declared "Venerable": June 9, 1984
  - Beatified: April 23, 1989 by Pope John Paul II
- Dina Bélanger (Marie of Saint Cecilia of Rome) (1897–1929), Professed Religious of the Religious of Jesus and Mary (Québec, Canada)
  - Declared "Venerable": May 13, 1989
  - Beatified: March 20, 1993 by Pope John Paul II
- Esther Blondin (Marie–Anne) (1809–1890), Founder of the Sisters of Saint Anne (Québec, Canada)
  - Declared "Venerable": May 14, 1991
  - Beatified: April 29, 2001 by Pope John Paul II
- Vasyl Velychkovsky (1903–1973), Professed Religious of the Redemptorists; Eparch of the "clandestine" Ukrainian Greek Catholic Church; Martyr (Ivano-Frankvisk, Ukraine – Manitoba, Canada)
  - Declared "Venerable": April 24, 2001
  - Beatified: June 27, 2001 by Pope John Paul II
- Mykyta Budka (1877–1949), Auxiliary Eparch of Lviv of the Ukrainians; Martyr (Ternopil, Ukraine – Karaganda, Kazakhstan)
  - Declared "Venerable": April 24, 2001
  - Beatified: June 27, 2001 by Pope John Paul II
- Émilie Tavernier-Gamelin (1800–1851), Founder of the Sisters of Providence of Montréal (Québec, Canada)
  - Declared "Venerable": December 23, 1993
  - Beatified: October 7, 2001 by Pope John Paul II
- Basil Moreau (1799–1873), Founder of the Sisters of Holy Cross (Québec, Canada)
  - Declared "Venerable": April 12, 2003
  - Beatified: September 16, 2007 by Pope Benedict XVI
- Marie-Louise-Élisabeth de Lamoignon de Molé de Champlâtreux (1763–1825), widow; founder of the Sisters of Charity of Saint Louis of Vannes (Québec, Canada)
  - Declared "Venerable": January 16, 1986
  - Beatified: November 27, 2011 by Cardinal Angelo Amato
- Marie-Élisabeth Turgeon (1840–1881), Founder of the Sisters of Our Lady of the Holy Rosary (Québec, Canada)
  - Declared "Venerable": October 9, 2013
  - Beatified: April 26, 2015 by Cardinal Angelo Amato, S.D.B.
- Louis Doumain (1920-1944), priest of the diocese of Viviers and martyr under the National Socialists with the Martyrs de l’Apostolat
  - Beatified: TBD

== Venerables ==
- Vital-Justin Grandin (1829–1902), Professed Priest of the Missionary Oblates of Mary Immaculate; Bishop of Saint-Albert (Mayenne, France – Alberta, Canada)
  - Declared "Venerable": December 15, 1966
- Alfred Pampalon (1867–1896), Professed Priest of the Redemptorists (Québec, Canada)
  - Declared "Venerable": May 14, 1991
- Élisabeth Bergeron (Mère Saint-Joseph) (1851–1936), Cofounder of the Sisters of Saint Joseph of Saint-Hyacinthe (Québec, Canada)
  - Declared "Venerable": January 12, 1996.
- Délia Tétreault (Marie of the Holy Spirit) (1865–1941), Founder of the Missionary Sisters of the Immaculate Conception (Québec, Canada)
  - Declared "Venerable": December 18, 1997
- Jérôme Le Royer de la Dauversière (1597–1659), Married Layperson of the Diocese of Le Mans; Cofounder of the Religious Hospitallers of Saint Joseph (Sarthe – Charente-Maritime, France)
  - Declared "Venerable": July 6, 2007
- Adolphe Châtillon (Théophanius-Léo) (1871–1929), Professed Religious of the Brothers of the Christian Schools (De La Salle Brothers) (Québec, Canada)
  - Declared "Venerable": April 2, 2011
- Marie-Josephte Fitzbach (Marie of the Sacred Heart) (1806–1885), Widow; Founder of the Servants of the Immaculate Heart of Mary, Good Shepherd Sisters (Québec, Canada)
  - Declared "Venerable": June 28, 2012
- Antoine Kowalczyk (1866–1947), Professed Religious of the Missionary Oblates of Mary Immaculate (Krotoszyn, Poland – Alberta, Canada)
  - Declared "Venerable": March 27, 2013
- Rosalie Cadron-Jetté (Mère of the Nativity) (1794–1864), Founder of the Misericordia Sisters (Québec, Canada)
  - Declared "Venerable": December 9, 2013
- Marie-Anne-Marcelle Mallet (1805–1871), Founder of the Sisters of Charity of Québec (Québec, Canada)
  - Declared "Venerable": January 27, 2014
- Joseph Staub (Marie-Clément) (1876–1936), Professed Priest of the Assumptionists; Founder of the Sisters of Saint Joan of Arc (Haut-Rhin, France – Québec, Canada)
  - Declared "Venerable": April 3, 2014
- Jeanne Mance (prob. 1606–1673) Layperson of the Archdiocese of Montréal (Haute-Marne, France – Québec, Canada)
  - Declared "Venerable": November 7, 2014
- William Gagnon (1905–1972), Professed Religious of the Hospitallers of Saint John of God
  - Declared "Venerable": December 14, 2015
- Aurélie Caouette (Catherine-Aurélie of the Precious Blood) (1833–1905), Founder of the Sisters Adorers of the Precious Blood (Québec, Canada)
  - Declared "Venerable": December 1, 2016
- Élisabeth Bruyère (1818–1876), Founder of the Sisters of Charity of Ottawa (Québec – Ontario, Canada)
  - Declared "Venerable": April 14, 2018
- Ovide Charlebois (1862–1933), Professed Priest of the Missionary Oblates of Mary Immaculate; Apostolic Vicar of Keewatin; Titular Bishop of Berenice (Québec - Manitoba, Canada)
  - Declared "Venerable": November 28, 2019

== Servants of God ==
- Jeanne Le Ber (1662–1714), Layperson of the Archdiocese of Montréal (Québec, Canada)
- Martyrs of French Revolution:
  - Anne Le Prince veuve le Blanc (1721–1794), Married Layperson of the Diocese of Quimper-Léon (Nova Scotia, Canada – Finistère, France)
  - Anastasie le Blanc (1760–1794), Layperson of the Diocese of Quimper-Léon (Nova Scotia, Canada – Finistère, France)
- Michael Power (1804–1847), Bishop of Toronto (Nova Scotia – Ontario, Canada)
- Stephen Eckert (Stephen of Dublin) (1869–1923), Professed Priest of the Franciscan Capuchins (Ontario, Canada – Wisconsin, United States)
- Elzéar DeLamarre (1854–1925), Priest of the Diocese of Chicoutimi; Founder of the Antonian Sisters of Mary (Québec, Canada)
- Vénérance Morin-Rouleau (Bernarda) (1832–1929), Founder of the Sisters of Providence of Chile [now part of the Sisters of Providence of Montréal] (Québec, Canada – Santiago, Chile)
- Léon Pratte (1864–1930), Priest of the Diocese of Saint-Hyacinthe (Québec, Canada) (non-causa)
- Gérard Raymond (1912–1932), Seminarian of the Archdiocese of Québec (Québec, Canada)
- Louis Doumain (1920–1944), Priest of the Diocese of Viviers; Martyr (Alberta, Canada – Saalekreis, Germany)
- Eugène Prévost (1860–1946), Priest and Founder of the Congregation of the Sacerdotal Fraternity and of the Oblate Sisters of Bethany (Québec – Maine-et-Loire, Canada)
- Albert L'Heureux (Alphonse) (1894–1947), Professed Priest of the Trappists; Martyr (Québec, Canada – Hebei, China)
- Louis Émond (1876–1949), Layperson of the Archdiocese of Québec (Québec, Canada)
- Victor Lelièvre (1876–1956), Professed Priest of the Missionary Oblates of Mary Immaculate (Ille-et-Vilaine, France – Québec, Canada)
- Pierre Fallaize (1887–1964), Professed Priest of the Missionary Oblates of Mary Immaculate; Auxiliary Bishop of MacKenzie (Calvados, France – Northwest Territories, Canada)
- Georges-Philias Vanier (1888–1967), Married Layperson of the Archdiocese of Ottawa; Governor-General of Canada (Québec – Ottawa, Canada)
- Gilberte Lapierre (Marie-Claire) (1895–1979), Professed Religious of the Poor Clare Nuns (Québec, Canada) (non-cause)
- Dorian LaPlante (Flavian) (1907–1981), Professed Religious of the Congregation of Holy Cross (Québec, Canada – Chittagong, Bangladesh)
- Catherine de Hueck Doherty (1896–1985), Married Layperson of the Diocese of Pembroke; Founder of the Madonna House Apostolate (Nizhegorodskaya oblast’, Russia – Ontario, Canada)
- Pauline Archer–Vanier (1898–1991), Married Layperson of the Archdiocese of Ottawa (Québec, Canada – Oise, France)
- Colette Lamontaigne Samson (1923–1991), Married Layperson of the Archdiocese of Québec (Québec, Canada)
- Carmelina Tarantino (Carmelina of the Cross) (1937–1992), Professed Religious of the Passionist Sisters of Saint Paul of the Cross (Naples, Italy – Ontario, Canada)
- Julienne Dallaire (Julienne du Rosaire) (1911–1995), Founder of the Dominican Missionary Adorers (Québec, Canada)
- Emiliano Tardif [Émilien] (1928–1999), Professed Priest of the Missionaries of the Sacred Heart; Founder of the Community of the Servants of the Living Christ (Québec, Canada – Córdoba, Argentina)

== Candidates for sainthood ==
- Nicolas Viel (d. 1625), Professed Priest of the Franciscan Friars Minor (Recollects) (Coutances, France – Québec, Canada)
- Auhaitsique [Ahuntsic] (d. 1625), Layperson of the Archdiocese of Québec (Québec, Canada)
- Joseph Chiwatenhwa (1602-1640) and Marie Aonetta (d.1650?), Married Laypersons of the Archdiocese of Québec (Québec, Canada)
- Barthélemy Vimont (1594-1667), Professed Priest of the Jesuits (Lisieux, France - Québec, Canada)
- Marie-Madeleine de Chauvigny de la Peltrie (1603-1671), Professed Religious of the Ursulines of Québec (Alençon, France – Québec, Canada)
- Pierre-Joseph-Marie Chaumonot (1611-1693), Professed Priest of the Jesuits (Châtillon-sur-Seine, France – Québec, Canada)
- Claude Pelletier (Didace) (1657-1699), Professed Religious of the Franciscan Friars Minor (Recollects) (Québec, Canada)
- Esther Wheelwright (Maria Joseph of the Infant Jesus) (1696–1780), Professed Religious of the Ursulines of Québec (Maine, USA – Québec, Canada)
- Frances Margaret Allen (1784–1819), Professed Religious of the Religious Hospitallers of Saint Joseph (Vermont, USA – Québec, Canada)
- Esther Pariseau (Marie-Joseph of the Sacred Heart) (1823–1902), Professed Religious of the Sisters of Providence of Montréal (Québec, Canada – Washington, USA)
- Éléonore Potvin (Marie-Zita of Jesus) (1865-1903), Founder of the Servants of Jesus-Marie (Canada)
- Jean-Baptiste Rouvière (1881–1913), Professed Priest of the Missionary Oblates of Mary Immaculate; Martyr (Lozères, France – Northwest Territories, Canada)
- Guillaume Le Roux (1885–1913), Professed Priests of the Missionary Oblates of Mary Immaculate; Martyr (Finistère, France – Northwest Territories, Canada)
- Alexis-Louis Mangin (1856-1920), Priest of the Archdiocese of Ottawa; Founder of the Servants of Jesus-Marie (Canada)
- Marie Bibeau (Marie-Anne de Jésus) (1865–1924), Founder of the Little Franciscans of Mary (Lower Canada, Canada – Massachusetts, USA)
- Marie Rose Ferron (1902-1936), Layperson of the Diocese of Providence (Canada-USA)
- Emma Tétu (Marie-Domitille) (1887–1942), Professed Religious of the Missionary Sisters of Our Lady of Africa (Québec, Canada)
- Martyrs of Fengxian (Jiangsu, China):
  - Alphonse Dubé (1890–1943), Professed Priest of the Jesuits (Québec, Canada)
  - Prosper Bernard (1902–1943), Professed Priest of the Jesuits (Québec, Canada)
  - Armand Lalonde (1904–1943), Professed Priest of the Jesuits (Québec, Canada)
- Rose Prince (1915-1949), Layperson of the Diocese of Prince George (Canada)
- Léon Arcand (Didace) (1886–1952), Professed Priest of the Franciscan Friars Minor (Québec, Canada – Shandong, China)
- Henri Roy (1898-1965), Professes Priest of the Missionary Oblates of Mary Immaculate; Founder of the Secular Institute "Pius X" (Maine, USA - Quebec, Canada)
- James Arthur Mackinnon (1932–1965), Priest of the Scarboro Foreign Mission Society; Martyr (Nova Scotia, Canada – Monte Plata, Dominican Republic)
- Martyrs of Maseru, Lesotho:
  - Almanzar Joseph Ménard (1906–1966), Professed Priest of the Missionary Oblates of Mary Immaculate (Québec, Canada)
  - Raynald Beauregard (1931–1976), Professed Priest of the Missionary Oblates of Mary Immaculate (Québec, Canada)
- Maurice Lefebvre Beaudry (1922–1971), Professed Priest of the Missionary Oblates of Mary Immaculate; Martyr (Québec, Canada – La Paz, Bolivia)
- Martyrs of Uganda:
  - Jean-Paul Demers (1910–1971), Priest of the Missionaries of Africa (White Fathers) (Québec, Canada)
  - Gérard Perrault (1915–1971), Priest of the Missionaries of Africa (White Fathers) (Québec, Canada)
  - Wilfred Lépine (1923–1980), Priest of the Missionaries of Africa (White Fathers) (Québec, Canada)
- Raoul Joseph Léger (1951–1981), Layperson of the Archdiocese of Moncton; Lay Missionary of the Québec Foreign Missionary Society; Martyr (New Brunswick, Canada – Guatemala City, Guatemala)
- Douglas William Main (John) (1926–1982), Professed Priest of the Benedictines (Olivetan Congregation) (London, United Kingdom – Québec, Canada)
- Claudia Murphy (Sybil) (1930-1996), Professed Religious of the Missionary Sisters of Our Lady of Africa (Nova Scotia, Canada – Cape Coast, Ghana)
- Mary Josephine Mulligan (1920–1996), Founder of the Sisters of Our Lady Immaculate (Québec, Canada)
- Jean-Luc Hudon (Bernardin-Jean) (1936-1998), Professed Religious of the Brothers of the Christian Schools (De La Salle Brothers); Martyr (Québec, Canada – Sud-Est, Haiti)
- Martin John Royackers (1959-2001), Professed Priest of the Jesuits; Martyr (Ontario, Canada – Saint Mary, Jamaica)
- William Lloyd Ryan (1917–2003), Priest of the Diocese of Hamilton; Founder of the Sisters of Our Lady Immaculate (Ontario – Québec, Canada)
- Richard Émile Joyal (1951-2013), Professed Priest of the Society of Mary (Marianists); Martyr (Manitoba, Canada – Port-au-Prince, Haiti)
- Martyrs of Rwanda:
  - François Cardinal (1942–1992), professed religious, Brothers of Christian Instruction (De La Mennais Brothers) (Québec, Canada)
  - Claude Simard (1933–1994), professed priest, Congregation of Holy Cross (Québec, Canada)
  - Guy Pinard (1945–1997), priest of the Missionaries of Our Lady of Africa (White Fathers) (Québec, Canada)

== See also ==
- Roman Catholic Church in Canada
- List of American saints and beatified people
- List of Mexican Saints
- List of Central American and Caribbean Saints
- List of saints of the Canary Islands
- List of Scandinavian saints
