= Julie Wheelwright =

British journalist, writer

- Born: Julie Diana Wheelwright; 1960 (age 65–66); Farnborough, Kent, England
- Occupations: Journalist, writer, film-maker, lecturer
- Years active: 1980-present

Julie Wheelwright (born 1960) is a British journalist, writer and film-maker, who lectures at City, University of London. Although raised in British Columbia, Canada, she was born in England and returned there in 1984 to complete a master's degree at the University of Sussex. Wheelwright worked as a journalist for national newspapers like The Guardian and The Observer and regularly wrote for Scotland on Sunday and BBC History. She published her first book in 1989 about women who cross-dressed to participate in war. Amazons and Military Maids: Women Who Cross-Dressed in the Pursuit of Life, Liberty and Happiness was chosen as one of The Times Literary Editor's Selections in February 1989. She has also published a biography and a film script exposing that although Mata Hari was convicted of espionage, she was not engaged in spying. Other works include a book and a film about her ancestor, Esther Wheelwright, and articles and a film about infanticide. Her latest book, Sisters in Arms: Female Warriors from Antiquity to the New Millennium, expanded on her first book and was shortlisted for the British Army Military Book of the Year in 2021. Since 2002, she has lectured at City, University of London. After earning her PhD in 2014, she became the director of the Centre for Culture and the Creative Industries at the university.

== Early life and education ==
Julie Diana Wheelwright was born in 1960, in Farnborough, Kent, England, to Patricia Doreen "Tish" (née Ball) and David Antony Wheelwright. Her mother was the daughter of Eva (née St. Claire) and Major Charles Ball, a veteran of both world wars. Tish was one of the children evacuated from Britain by the Children's Overseas Reception Board to Canada in 1940, where she lived until 1944. After returning to Britain, Tish earned a degree in English literature at Trinity College Dublin. Wheelwright's father was the son of Beatrice Ella and John "Jack" Sylvester Wheelwright, who was a wing commander and flew dirigibles for the Royal Air Force. David was a sub-lieutenant in the Royal Navy and served in Singapore during World War II. After his military service, he graduated from Keble College, Oxford, with a degree in medicine. After their marriage in 1958, David and Tish lived in St. George's, Bermuda, where David worked as a medic for the Colonial Service and Tish cared for their first child, Geoffrey. The family moved back to England in 1960 and had two more children, Julie and Amanda, before deciding to move to Calgary, Alberta, Canada in 1962. Their youngest child, Penelope "Penny" was born in Calgary, where David worked as a physician for six years. In 1968, they moved to British Columbia, first living in Westbank and then Vancouver, before settling in Kelowna in 1971.

Wheelwright completed her secondary education in Kelowna, and then enrolled in 1978 at the University of British Columbia to study history with hopes of becoming a journalist. She began writing for the Vancouver Sun in 1980 and was elected as president of the Canadian University Press in 1981, serving as president elect in 1982 and president in 1983. After graduating with her bachelor's degree, Wheelwright moved to London in 1984, and completed a master's degree at the University of Sussex in 1986.

== Career ==
Wheelwright then worked as a journalist for both The Guardian and The Observer. She also regularly published literary reviews and articles in journals like Scotland on Sunday and BBC History, and created documentary films for BBC Radio Four. In 1989, she published her first book, Amazons and Military Maids: Women Who Cross-Dressed in the Pursuit of Life, Liberty and Happiness, which grew out of her research for her master's thesis. Wheelwright said that the book was about women who wanted to escape from the narrow confines of their social roles and experience male privilege. She pointed out that while some of the women featured in the book were eccentric, others chose cross-dressing for economic reasons. It was chosen as one of The Times Literary Editor's Selections in February 1989. Michelene Wandor's review for The Times observed that the lack of records on women's history left gaps in the biographies covered, but called the book "clear and accessible". Wandor stated that Wheelwright discussed not only cross-dressing, but women's relationship to war, showing that there was not an automatic link between women and pacifism. Martha Vicinus, a women's studies professor, said Wheelwright's book indicated that many documents confirmed that fellow soldiers often colluded with disguised women to keep them from being detected. Wheelwright's chapter "Tars, Tarts, and Swashbucklers" in Bold in Her Breeches, edited by historian Jo Stanley (1996) was deemed by reviewer Joan Druett as "impressive" for the insight given into the motives and methods of women pirates, and why their stories have endured in popular culture.

In 1992, Wheelwright published The Fatal Lover: Mata Hari and the Myth of Women in Espionage. Reviewed by critic Anthony Cronin, the book chronicled the life of Margaretha Geertruida MacLeod, who became famous as Mata Hari an exotic dancer and courtesan. Cronin found Wheelwright's research was exhaustive and meticulous in verifying that Mata Hari was not engaged in espionage, but he called her writing "somewhat lacking in style". Historian Tammy M. Proctor confirmed that Wheelwright had shown that the "spy-courtesan" label attached to Mata Hari was a myth, based in male fantasy and fear of betrayal, rather than reality. Anne McElvoy of The Times called the book a "fascinating and well-researched study" about a bored Dutch housewife, who became a dancer to escape her marriage and access luxuries, but who was convicted on evidence of spying that the French prosecutors admitted, was seriously inadequate. Despite finding Wheelwright's "biographical craft" enjoyable, McElvoy took issue with the author's feminist reworking of the victimisation of women by men. She said the book failed to account for why many women are willing to engage with the world playing by rules made by men or explore fully male attitudes towards women engaged in espionage. Working with director Françoise Levie and co-writer Jill Brett, the story was adapted as a French-language documentary film, Mata Hari: mythe et réalité d'une espionne (Mata Hari: Myth and Reality of a Spy) in 1998.

With her sister, Penny, Wheelwright wrote the script for Orkney Lad: The Story of Isabel Gunn, a 2001 documentary film directed by Anne Wheeler. The film told the story of Isabel Gunn, a Scottish woman who worked disguised as a man in the nineteenth century for the Hudson's Bay Company. The two sisters produced the documentary Captive: The Story of Esther in 2005. The film told the story of their ancestor, Esther Wheelwright, an Ursuline nun, who had been captured by Wabanaki warriors as a child and taken from her home in Maine to Canada. After a Jesuit missionary negotiated for her release, Esther was taken to a convent, joined the order, and later became the first English-born mother superior of the Ursulines of Quebec. In 2011, Wheelwright expanded on the topic in the book, Esther: The Remarkable True Story of Esther Wheelwright: Puritan Child, Native Daughter, Mother Superior. Historians Peter Seixas and Tom Morton, based Chapter 5 of their textbook, The Big Six Historical Thinking Concepts on an evaluation of Wheelwright's book on Esther. They analysed how in Esther, Wheelwright dealt with changing historical perspective, meaning how historical figures viewed their own lives as opposed to how those lives were currently viewed. Seixas and Morton praised Wheelwright's method of describing her research process and questions – such as how did Esther view her captivity, or her Catholicism as opposed to her Puritan heritage – while weaving in Esther's life story without the benefit of documentation from Esther. They stated that Wheelwright made plain her recognition that her own life experiences – at a time where feminist ideals, multi-culturalism, and secular values were prevalent – were of no help in understanding Esther's eighteenth-century life and motivations. Seixas and Morton wrote that Wheelwright's "transparency about the challenges she faced" in writing the book, served as a model for other writers "to arrive at plausible, evidence-based claims".

Wheelwright wrote an article on infanticide for The Guardian in 1995, after Caroline Beale was arrested at John F. Kennedy International Airport in New York City on her return trip from a vacation heading to England with her deceased infant. Over the next three years, Wheelwright began researching the topic for a BBC documentary and interviewed several mothers who had killed their children, publishing numerous articles on child murder. The documentary, QED: Deadly Secrets, produced by Clare Richards, aired on BBC One on 5 August 1998. Wheelwright continued to investigate the topic, publishing a chapter on contemporary cases of infanticide in the 2002 book Infanticide: Historical Perspectives on Child Murder and Concealment, 1550 – 2000 , edited by Mark Jackson. Her chapter analysed differences such as poverty and exploitation by men, which were reported historically, but were no longer relevant to the crime. The public reaction to mothers who kill had remained unchanged; they were either considered mad, garnering sympathy, or bad and condemned. She estimated that abandonment or murder occurs at a rate of about twenty cases annually in modern England and Wales.

By 2002, Wheelwright was lecturing on journalism at City, University of London, where she became director of the master's course in creative nonfiction writing in 2007. She earned her PhD from the University of London in 2014, was promoted to senior lecturer, and that year became the "director of the Centre for Culture and the Creative Industries at City University". Wheelwright expanded and updated Amazons and Military Maids in 2020, with a new title, Sisters in Arms: Female Warriors from Antiquity to the New Millennium. The updated work also included stories of women who no longer had to disguise themselves to participate in battle, but still faced "sex-based patterns of oppression and harmful stereotypes". In her review of the book, Phyllis Reeve said that Wheelwright told the centuries-long history of women who fought using life narratives, which did not necessarily lend themselves to chronological organisation because of the complexity of their stories. Political scientist Kristen Williams stated in her review that the book explored how the idea of women warriors creates tensions as a result of traditional gender expectations of masculinity and femininity. Williams also noted that although the book includes the Greek myths about women warriors and early history, the majority of the work covered women from the eighteenth century and beyond. While saying that Sisters in Arms was highly reliant on historical texts and could have benefited from an interdisciplinary approach including scholarship from other fields, Williams concluded that it was an "informative resource and a pleasure to read". In 2021, it was shortlisted for the British Army Military Book of the Year.

== Selected works ==
=== Film ===
- Levie, Françoise (director); Wheelwright, Julie and Brett, Jill (writers) (1998). Mata Hari mythe et réalité d'une espionne [Mata Hari: Myth and Reality of a Spy] (documentary film) (in French). Belgium: Sofidoc, Les Films du Triangle. OCLC 1291176412.
- Richards, Clare (producer); Wheelwright, Julie (writer) (1998). QED: Deadly Secrets (documentary film). London, UK: BBC Worldwide Ltd. OCLC 43731966.
- Wheeler, Anne (director); Wheelwright, Julie and Penny (writers) (2001). Orkney Lad: The Story of Isabel Gunn (documentary film). Mississauga, Ontario: Marlin Motion Pictures. OCLC 57619557.
- Southam, Tim (director); Wheelwright, Julie and Penny (writers) (2004). A Spy's Life: Kitty Harris (documentary film). Mississauga, Ontario: Marlin Motion Pictures. OCLC 243537898.
- Wheelwright, Julie and Penny (producers) (2005). Captive: The Story of Esther (documentary film). Mississauga, Ontario: Marlin Motion Pictures. OCLC 145719573.

=== Print ===
- Wheelwright, Julie (1989). Amazons and Military Maids: Women Who Cross-Dressed in the Pursuit of Life, Liberty and Happiness (1st ed.). London, UK: Pandora Press. ISBN 978-0-04-440356-2.
- Wheelwright, Julie (1992). The Fatal Lover: Mata Hari and the Myth of Women in Espionage. London, UK: Collins & Brown. ISBN 978-1-85585-105-4.
- Wheelwright, Julie (1996). "11. Tars, Tarts, and Swashbucklers". In Stanley, Jo (ed.). Bold in Her Breeches: Women Pirates across the Ages. London, UK: Pandora Press. pp. 176–200. ISBN 978-0-04-440970-0.
- Wheelwright, Julie (2002). "13. 'Nothing in between': Modern Cases of Infanticide". In Jackson, Mark (ed.). Infanticide: Historical Perspectives on Child Murder and Concealment, 1550 - 2000. Burlington, Vermont: Ashgate Publishing. pp. 270–286. ISBN 978-0-7546-0318-4.
- Wheelwright, Julie (2011). Esther: The Remarkable True Story of Esther Wheelwright: Puritan Child, Native Daughter, Mother Superior (1st ed.). Toronto, Canada: HarperCollins Publishers. ISBN 978-0-00-200723-8.
- Wheelwright, Julie (Autumn 2017). "Historic Passion: The Other Place". History Workshop Journal (84). Oxford, Oxfordshire: Oxford University Press: 257–263. doi:10.1093/hwj/dbx039. ISSN 1363-3554. JSTOR 48554775. OCLC 7169177125.
- Wheelwright, Julie (2020). Sisters in Arms: Female Warriors from Antiquity to the New Millennium. Oxford, Oxfordshire, England: Osprey Publishing. ISBN 978-1-4728-3800-1.
