= École des Ursulines, Quebec =

Coordinates: 46°48′42″N 71°12′29″W

Ecole des Ursulines
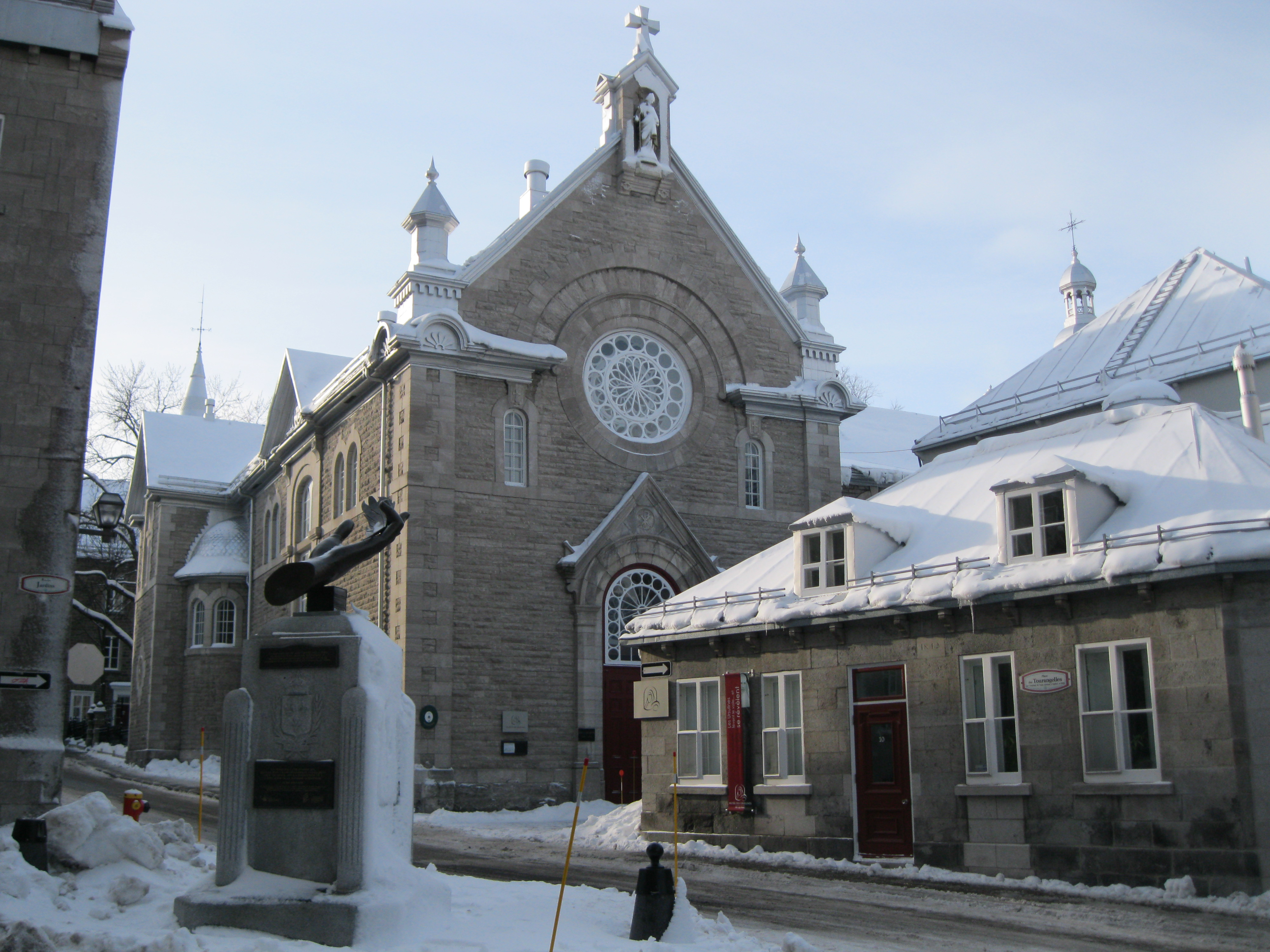

Location
- 4, rue du Parloir; Quebec City, Quebec, G1R 4M5; Canada

Information
- School type: Primary
- Religious affiliation: Catholic
- Established: 1639; 387 years ago
- Principal: Serge Goyette
- Website: www.ursulinesquebec.com/francais/quebec/

The Ecole des Ursulines, known in English as the School of the Ursulines, is among North America's oldest schools. Still operating as a private school for both girls and boys, it was founded in 1639 by French nun Marie of the Incarnation and laywoman Marie-Madeline de Chauvigny de la Peltrie. This was also the beginning of the Ursuline order in New France.

The convent has many of its original walls intact and houses a little chapel and a museum. Located in the middle of the historical Old Quebec neighbourhood of Quebec City, Quebec, which is recognized by UNESCO as a World Heritage District. The school has two campuses. In the Quebec City campus, there are more than four hundred children enrolled from pre-school through primary school (5 to 12 years). There is also a coeducational campus in Loretteville.

== See also ==
- Ursulines of Quebec
- Ursulines
- Old Quebec
