= Anne Bourdon =

Anne Bourdon (August 29, 1644 – November 4, 1711) was a nun in New France. She was the first Canadian-born superior of the Ursuline order in New France. She was also known as Mère de Sainte-Agnès.

The daughter of Jean Bourdon, attorney general for the colony, and Jacqueline Potel, she was born in Quebec City. All of her three sisters joined religious orders. She became a novice in the order of the Ursulines of Quebec at the age of 14, and took her vows two years later, taking the name of Anne de Sainte-Agnès. She learned the languages of the native peoples from Marie of the Incarnation. She served as depositary, secretary of the chapter, assistant superior and mistress of novices. When the archives of the community were destroyed by fire in 1686, she reconstructed the archives from memory. In June 1700, she was elected superior for the congregation.

She died at Quebec City at the age of 67 of pleurisy.
