= Sea queen =

1960s term for gay men who work aboard merchant vessels

Sea queens is a term referring to gay men who worked aboard mainly merchant vessels before the 1960s. They were predominantly effeminate men who worked in entertainment or as waiters on cruise ships, often acting as off-shore 'wives' for heterosexual sailors during voyages. They were also present in the Navy, as described in the nonfiction monograph Hello Sailor! The Hidden History of Gay Life at Sea by Paul Baker and Jo Stanley, which shares their stories and experiences. The use of Polari language and the attempted expulsion of gay male sailors in Newport, Rhode Island after World War I can also be traced back to sea queens.

== Written narrative ==
=== Hello Sailor! The Hidden History of Gay Life at Sea ===
During the 1950s and 1960s a large percentage of gay men began joining the Navy. In the Navy, gay men could be truthful about their sexuality. They used it as an outlet of freedom where they could express themselves, whether that was through different clothing or other traits and were able to do this without the fear of being discriminated against.

== Historical context ==
=== Polari ===
Gay men may have used Polari to communicate during these times. Polari was a coded language used by gay men that used metaphors and coded or made up words to talk about the topic of homosexuality without others around them knowing.

=== Discrimination in Newport ===
The community of sea queens and the growing number of gays in the Navy was not the only event of this period. Other events reflected the surge in the gay population, but not all had positive outcomes. One notable instance occurred in Newport, Rhode Island where gay male sailors were targeted by the military, discriminated against, and even arrested for being gay.

== See also ==
- Hall–Carpenter Archives
- Men who have sex with men
