= Joseph Chiwatenhwa =

Early Christian convert in Canada

Joseph Chiwatenhwa (spelled Chihwatenhaw in some sources) is among the first believers of the indigenous peoples of Canada who accepted the Christian faith through the missionary and evangelistic work of the French Province of the Society of Jesus in the 17th century.

== Biography ==
The Jesuits established their first missions in Canada in the early decades of the 1600s and were assisted in Huronia by a number of new believers, among whom were Joseph Chiwatenhwa and his wife Marie Aonnetta, in addition to his brother Joseph and other members of the family. Chiwatenhwa was "deeply moved" by the Christian teachings of the Jesuit missionaries in 1636 when he first encountered them, despite the fact that others of his Wendat (Huron) tribe blamed these missionaries for the epidemics that had broken out in Wendat lands. Chiwatenhwa was also motivated by a desire to learn what was perceived to be Jesuit sorcery.

Chiwatenhwa himself fell sick; after his recovery, however, he was baptized, on August 16, 1637, by Father Jean de Brébeuf, and given the Christian name Joseph. His wife, Aonetta, was baptized on March 19, 1638; her Christian name was Marie. Their marriage was blessed on the same day; this was the first Catholic wedding in Wendat territory. Joseph became the first lay administrator in the Catholic Church in Canada, in 1639. He helped the Jesuits translate hymns and prayers from French into Wendat. He was impressed with the teachings of Saint Ignatius and the Spiritual Exercises in particular. During his eight-day silent retreat, he composed a prayer about Jesus: "You love us so deeply that all I can do in return is to offer myself to you. I chose you as my elder and chief. There is no one else." In adopting his new faith, Joseph drew on many of the spiritual and cultural teachings of his people; he entered the Catholic Church as a Wendat. This helped him spread the gospel to many members of his family and tribe.

Joseph Chiwatenhwa was killed on August 2, 1640, aged 38. Gabriel Lalemant considered Chiwatenhwa a great catechist amongst his own people. Marie Guyart called Chiwatenhwa "the Apostle with the Apostles" for his energy and apostolic zeal. According to historian Bruce Trigger, he was murdered by other Wendat who "obviously loathed him as a sorcerer who had turned against his own people" but that this act was obscured by being blamed on the Seneca people.

After Joseph's martyrdom his family continued to be Christian, and more members of the Wendat nation were baptized into the Catholic Church. Chiwatenhwa may be beatified oblatio vitae, or free offering of one’s life. A miracle attributed to his intercession would have to be documented for his cause for canonization. Pope John Paul II said at Huronia that "the worthy traditions of the Indian tribes were strengthened and enriched by the Gospel message … not only is Christianity relevant to the Indian peoples, but Christ, in the members of his Body, is himself Indian."

== See also ==
- Kateri Tekakwitha
- North American Martyrs
