= Esther Wheelwright =

Ursuline nun (1696–1780)

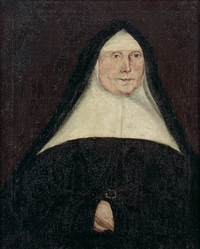

Personal life
- Born: 31 March 1696 Wells, Maine
- Died: 28 November 1780 (aged 84) Québec City, Canada; New France
- Known for: Only foreign-born Superior of the Ursulines of Québec
- Other name: Mère Marie-Joseph de l'Enfant-Jésus

Religious life
- Religion: Roman Catholic
- Order: Ursuline

Esther Wheelwright (31 March 1696 – 28 November 1780), also known as Mère Marie-Joseph de l'Enfant-Jésus, was a French Canadian nun.

Born in Wells, Massachusetts (present day Maine), Wheelwright was captured during an attack of her village during Queen Anne's War in 1703 by a group of French-Canadians and Wabanaki Indians. For five years, Wheelwright was raised by the French-allied Catholic Wabanaki, and then was brought to Québec where she was placed in the school of the Ursulines of Québec. She remained there the rest of her life, becoming a choir nun and eventually the Mother Superior of the convent in the immediate aftermath of the 1759 British conquest of Québec. She is notable not only for having lived in three major North American cultures, but also because she was and remains the only foreign-born Mother Superior the Ursulines of Québec have ever elected.

== Early life ==
Esther Wheelwright was born in 1696, the fourth of eleven children, to John Wheelwright and Mary Snell. John Wheelwright served as a tavern keeper and justice of the peace of the province. He built a garrison and was licensed to "keep a house of public entertainment", where they served alcoholic beverages. It became a common stopover for influential men (governors, judges, ministers, generals, lords) as well as common travelers and traders.

Esther's was a deeply religious Puritan family where Sabbath rules were strictly followed. Esther's father led the family service on Saturday night. On Sunday, the family walked in a procession to the meetinghouse for a full day service. The Wheelwright household at the turn of the eighteenth century included the Wheelwright parents and their children, as well as Anglo-American indentured servants and at least a few enslaved African Americans. Esther's grandfather Samuel Wheelwright owned slaves in the 1690s, and both her father and mother continued to own slaves in the 1740s and 1750s, which they bequeathed to free family members. Slavery was common in New England even in rural places like southern Maine, and it could be just as abusive as life in plantations in the southern Anglo-American colonies. The murder of Rachel, an enslaved woman in Kittery, illustrates the isolation and brutality of New England slavery.

Puritan girls were taught to never be idle, thus even at the age of seven Esther would have been expected to help with the daily routines of cooking for the family and guests at the inn and keeping safe her younger siblings. Because she was growing up in a tavern on the borderlands of Anglo-American colonial invasion, the world came through the Wheelwright garrison. She was probably familiar with the Wabanaki because they sold beaver, otter, and bear skins to English traders like her father, in exchange for cloth and other imported goods. But despite the casual trade between the Wabanaki and English traders, there existed mutual animosity and distrust.

=== Capture by the Wabanaki ===
During the late summer and early fall of 1702 there was talk of an imminent attack by the Indians and French. By the spring of 1703, French and Indian forces were stationed along the borderlands preparing for their attack. On 21 August 21, 1703 the two-day attack ensued. The Wheelwrights′ status, and John Wheelwright's involvement as militia captain, meant that they were one of the prime targets. The attack covered an area of over fifty miles. People who escaped capture were killed, buildings were torched and homes were looted. The only Wheelwright among the seven kidnapped was Esther, who was taken captive by the Wabanaki.

Because of her age and sex, Esther was probably adopted into a Wabanaki family, and was expected to assume the personality, duties, and role of a Wabanaki daughter. As her adoptive family taught her how to live as a Wabanaki girl and to pray as a Catholic, it is possible that they "became attached to this child with an extraordinary affection". After only a few months with the Wabanaki, Esther had probably shed so much of her former identity that she would have barely been recognized by her English family. While there is no direct evidence that Esther was renamed following her conversion to Catholicism, there is evidence that many Catholic Wabanaki women who were baptized were named Catherine or Marie. It is possible that Esther was renamed "Mali," (pronounced as "Molly" in General American English), which is a Wabanaki corruption of the name "Marie."

At the time of Esther's capture, food was scarce among the Wabanaki, as constant warfare with the English had greatly disrupted the flow of agricultural harvest in the area. Malnutrition and disease were widespread, especially among children. Scurvy was particularly common among the Wabanaki, carrying off a number of women and children. Due to the poor health of most Wabanaki at the time, it is likely Esther would have suffered a number of deficiencies during her captivity.

Jacques and Vincent Bigot, brothers and Jesuit priests, were active missionaries in Acadia and Quebec from the 1680s through the 1710s. They were probably some of the first French priests she met, and they were instrumental in her eventual move to Québec because of their long history of bringing Wabanaki girls to the Ursuline convent school.

=== Life at the Chateâu St. Louis ===
Esther's birth family eventually learned about her new religion and, using their ties through the government of Massachusetts, petitioned the General Governor of New France, Philippe de Rigaud, Marquis de Vaudreuil, to get her back. Vaudreuil had the clear order from Versailles: "You have nothing so important in the present state of affairs as the maintenance of peace with the Iroquois and other Indian nations." Wartime conditions meant that it was difficult to act on Esther's return to Wells. Vaudreuil himself was denouncing the "deplorable state" of New France's economy to his superiors and had to carefully plan his moves. In order to negotiate a better deal with New England, Vaudreuil started to spread the idea that the young girl was the daughter of an important English man. Esther, in these conditions, found herself sheltered at his own residence, the Chateau St. Louis, in Québec City.

For a year, Esther was immersed in the French aristocracy. Vaudreuil's wife, Louise-Élisabeth de Joybert, took her under her wing. Although he must have known that she was not from a very important family, he called her "the daughter of a governor of a small place", inflating her family's status by calling her father a "governor," a title which in New France was reserved for ennobled men only. Upon her arrival, she would have been 'degreased' and dressed up à la française. Her new household was served by indigenous slaves, although Vaudreuil had never admitted this to his superiors. Esther had known life as a Puritan, then as a Wabanaki, and now she experienced a taste of life as a French aristocrat in New France.

Of the various societies and environments Esther lived in, the transition from living among the Wabanaki and life with the Vaudreuil family in the Chateau St. Louis was the most stark. Esther, who had previously been accustomed to living in intimate close quarters with her adopted Wabanaki family, would have found the Chateau St. Louis to be large and luxurious in comparison. She would likely have been introduced to imported luxuries such as chinaware, and attended events such as lavish balls and banquets.

However, her time at the Chateau St. Louis was brief. By January 1709, she was enrolled as a boarding student at the Ursuline boarding school.

== Life as an Ursuline ==
=== Beginning with the Ursulines ===
On 18 January 1709 Esther was enrolled as a boarding student in the Ursuline boarding school. She proved to be a good student, excelling in music, languages, grammar and embroidery. She deepened her interest in Catholicism, especially its mysticism component. After being with the Ursulines for 18 months as a pupil, she asked to become a nun. Father Bigot, who had spent some time with the girl previously, sponsored her entry and used his influence to get her accepted by the Ursulines. He was particularly attached to the young girl, convinced of his own triumph at turning a Puritan girl into a devoted Catholic. However, Vaudreuil who had promised her return to her family, intervened and took her back to his residence the following fall with the intention of fulfilling his promise. Convinced of her future vocation as a nun, Esther was reluctant to return to her Puritan origins. Vaudreuil's plan did not work out and, in June 1711, she was sent to the Hôtel-Dieu, where she spent several months. The place was sheltering other English captives, among whom she met two of her own cousins, Mary Silver and Esther Sayward. Although Esther was eventually sent to Trois-Rivières, where the Ursulines were looking forward to having her, the young girl decided she rather preferred to be placed with the Ursulines of Québec City.

=== Life as an Ursuline nun ===
In 1712, Mother Superior Le Marie des Anges created a contract for 18-year-old Esther's entry to the convent. Esther then began a three-month postulancy, during which she abided by the disciplined monastic schedule but did not don the religious habit. Her connections with Father Bigot and the Marquis de Vaudreuil allowed Esther to have an impressive career as an Ursuline nun. Most women of modest backgrounds like Esther who were joining the Ursulines were only permitted to become lay nuns, meaning they were relegated to the back of the procession and were forbidden to sing in church. Esther, however, was allowed to become a choir nun despite not being able to afford the full dowry.

In January 1713, Wheelwright was given her veil and habit and became a novice as Sister Esther Marie Joseph de l'Enfant Jésus. Father Bigot paid for her marriage gown, normally the responsibility of the novice's parents, and delivered the sermon at the ceremony. His story of her life emphasized Catholic and French resilience in the face of grim English Protestantism. As the great-granddaughter of a Protestant minister, who was raised by the Wabanaki then converted to Catholicism and embraced French culture, Esther's story was a symbol of the future of French superiority in the New World.

For one year as a novice, Esther was trained for monastic life by observing a strict routine and following the Rules of the Quebec Ursulines. She performed daily activities in obedience to superiors and learned to sacrifice all luxuries. During her time as a novice, the Wheelwrights frequently wrote to Esther asking her to return. The letters did have an effect on Esther and she later admitted that they caused her "infinite trouble", but she remained committed to her religious life.

After the Treaty of Utrecht was signed on 11 April 1713, Esther was at risk of being reclaimed by English officers. On 16 February 1714, English commissioners met with the Marquise de Vaudreuil demanding proof that all captives who remained in New France were there by their own will. In the face of these threats, the Ursulines were forced to expedite Esther's novice training period so that she could take her vows as soon as possible. On 12 April 1714, Esther took her final vows as an Ursuline sister.

As an Ursuline nun, Sister Esther Marie-Joseph Wheelwright de l'Enfant Jésus had no contact with her family, and over time lost her connections with most people from her previous life. Those who had been instrumental in her joining the Ursulines, including the Marquise de Vaudreuil and Father Bigot, died in the succeeding years. In 1724, the Wabanaki were attacked by an English force led by a friend of the Wheelwrights, Captain Johnson Harmon, and many of the people with whom Esther grew up were killed.

Life inside the Ursuline Convent remained shuttered from the outside world. Some practices that were routinely practiced by Ursuline nuns during this period included self-mortification, which included flagellation. These practices were voluntary, but it is possible that Esther may have engaged in them.

As Esther moved up in the convent hierarchy, she took on more responsibilities. She progressed from class mistress, to principal of the boarding school, and mistress of the novices. In 1726 she became a religieuse vocale which meant she could vote in the assembly and became "Mother Marie-Joseph de l'Enfant Jésus". In 1747 Esther received correspondence from her mother stating that her father had died. In his will he left money for Esther and instructions for her brothers to take care of her should she ever return to Wells, indicating her parents' enduring hope for her return, even after many decades of religious commitment. After her parents' deaths, Esther's brothers maintained correspondence with their sister in Quebec, acknowledging the benefits that might come with having a contact in New France.

In 1759, English forces attacked New France in the Battle of Quebec. The nuns were evacuated from the convent and Esther was sent to the Hôpital Général as a nurse. General Louis-Joseph de Montcalm's army was overwhelmed by the English army, and Montcalm died on 14 September 1759. He was buried in the convent's chapel.

== Mother Superior and later life ==
During the war, Wheelwright had been assistant superior as the Ursulines nursed both French and British soldiers in the convent. On 15 December 1760 she was appointed Mother Superior of the Quebec Ursuline order. In part due to her respected personality, this was also a strategic move by the Order, as her English and Protestant heritage was crucial to maintaining the Ursulines' position and independence under British rule.

Esther's background facilitated contact with the British and made the Ursulines seem less threatening. The convent was a popular target of criticism, representing France, Catholicism, and women in power, and the Ursulines feared that the British might close the convent. Nevertheless, it had frequent contact with and visits from the community. The Mother Superior's threefold British, French and Indigenous ties made her a strong political symbol, and it was in the interest of the English to claim her as one of their own.

As Mother Superior, Esther functioned as a diplomat, maintaining good relations with the British Governors of Québec, Amherst and Murray, as well as with France. During the negotiations for the Quebec Act 1774, her diplomacy with Governor Guy Carleton proved influential. The convent was central to the City of Québec, both in location and in relation to the British. Right after the defeat of Québec in 1759, General Murray established both a British military hospital and Québec's first Anglican church in the convent.

Esther furthermore established close ties to Frances Moore Brooke, as her husband John Brooke was appointed chaplain of the Québec garrison by Murray, in charge of ministering to sick soldiers and conducting church services at the convent. Descriptions of both Esther and the Québec Ursuline convent are present in The History of Emily Montague, the first novel written in Canada.

The Ursulines being in great debt, Wheelwright established much-needed financial stability for the Order, primarily by encouraging the nuns to pursue Amerindian embroidery, using Native materials of birch bark, deer skin, and moose and porcupine hair to create images of saints. This was an arduous task, because the moose hair requiring constant rethreading, but the art became a commercial success, and many embroideries were sold to English soldiers and tourists. The Ursulines' economic self-sufficiency helped provide for their community services to French and Native inhabitants, and contributed to their independence from reform-minded bishops. In the latter half of the 18th century, the Ursuline school increasingly hosted British students, among them the Brookes' daughters.

The convent was marked by internal turmoil during Esther's final term as Mother Superior, due to a lack of new recruits, British opposition to the convent, and an increase in Catholic women converting to Anglicanism to marry. The remaining nuns were increasingly critical of Esther and the state of the school. The Ancien Régime was in its decline and they endured yet another military conflict in The Battle of Quebec and the ensuing siege. In 1772 Esther became assistant superior, and from 1778 until her death she served as an overseer and advisor.

Esther Wheelwright died in Québec City on 28 November 1780 at the age of 84, without suffering illness.

== See also ==
- Marie of the Incarnation
