= Geneviève Boucher =

Geneviève Boucher (August 19, 1676 – May 30, 1766) was a Canadian Ursuline nun also known as Mère (Mother) Geneviève de Saint-Pierre, O.S.U., or simply Mère de Saint-Pierre.

== Life ==
The youngest daughter of Pierre Boucher, Governor of Trois-Rivières and Seigneur of Boucherville, and Jeanne Crevier, she was born in Boucherville. In 1694, she left home to enter the novitiate of the Ursulines of Quebec and received the religious habit of the Order and her religious name from Jean-Baptiste de La Croix de Chevrières de Saint-Vallier, the Bishop of Quebec, on 14 September of that year. Two years later, on 18 September 1696, she professed religious vows and became a member of the Order. Her dowry was paid in both land and money.

Boucher served as bursar, as mistress of novices and boarders and as assistant superior. In 1750 she was elected superior of the monastery, holding that office for three years. At the end of her term, she was again elected as the assistant superior, serving from 1753 to 1759 in this office. At the end of this period, her health was no longer good and she retired from that post.

Boucher died at Quebec City at the age of 89.
