= Julienne Dallaire =

Canadian religious sister

Servant of God Julienne du Rosaire OP
- Born: Julienne Dallaire; 11 May 1911; Saint-Roch, Québec City, Canada
- Died: 6 January 1995 (aged 83); Beauport, Québec City, Canada

Julienne Dallaire (religious name Mère Julienne du Rosaire; 23 May 1911 – 6 January 1995) was a Franco-Canadian nun, mystic and founder of the Dominican Missionary Adorers. Her cause for beatification has been opened.

== Biography ==
=== Early life ===
Julienne Dallaire was born on 23 May 1911 in Saint-Roch, Québec City, the second child of a family of nine children and the eldest daughter. She received her Christian formation from the Congregation of Notre Dame of Montreal at the Académie Saint-Roch.

=== Religious life ===
At the age of twelve, Dallaire felt that she was called to a religious life. She joined the Franciscan Missionaries of Mary at the age of seventeen, but had to leave afterwards for health reasons. She tried entering two different congregations, at the age of 21 and at the age of 29 respectively, which she had to leave both for health reasons.

In 1941, Canon Cyrille Labrecque became her spiritual advisor. On 30 April 1945, with the approval of the Archbishop of Québec City, Jean-Marie-Rodrigue Villeneuve OMI, she founded the Dominican Missionary Adorers with the mission of spreading the Gospel through catechesis, preaching, teaching in schools, animation of youth groups or adult gatherings, and works of charity that promote human and social development.

Dallaire's congregation was canonically recognized on 7 October 1948, and the first religious professions were made on the same day, including herself. At first, the congregation was installed on the upper floor of a house in Beauport, Quebec City, and later came to occupy the entire house. In 1950, a convent was built in Beauport and became the Mother House of the congregation and in 1952, the congregation was affiliated with the Dominican Order.

=== Death ===
Dallaire continued her service, guiding and leading, within the congregation she founded until her death on 6 January 1995.

== Beatification ==
In October 2004, a preliminary investigation for Dallaire's beatification was launched by Cardinal Marc Ouellet PSS. On 14 September 2008, the diocesan inquiry was opened. On 7 February 2010, the inquiry closed and the documents were sealed during a ceremony in the Cathedral-Basilica of Notre-Dame de Québec before being sent to Rome to the Dicastery for the Causes of Saints where they are to be analyzed.
