= Jo Stanley (historian) =

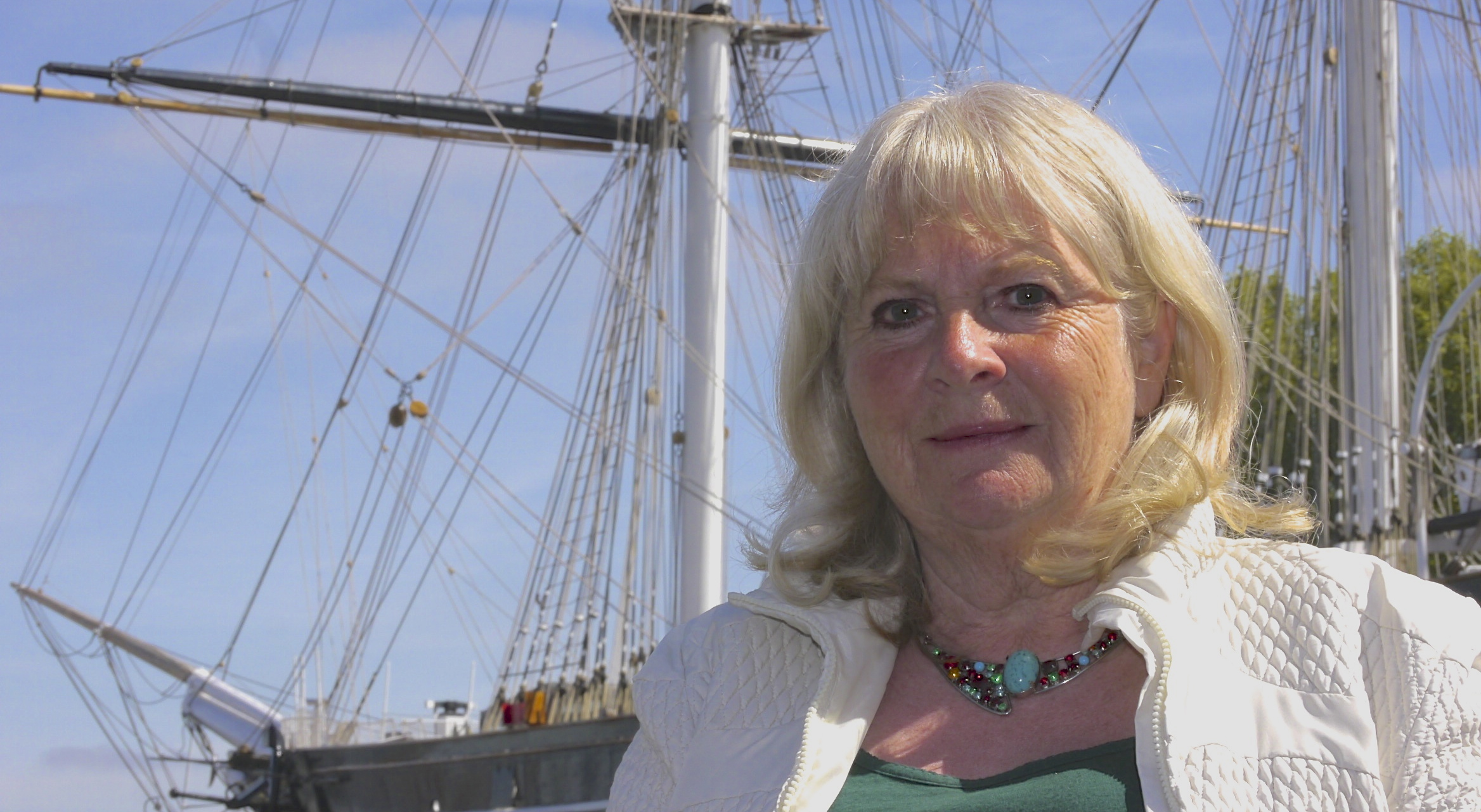
British-based author and creative historian Jo Stanley.

Jo Stanley FRHistS (born 1949) is a British-based author and creative historian who focuses on the gendered seas. Women and LGBT seafarers are among the hidden histories focused upon in her books, articles, exhibitions and conference papers, as well as plays and talks.

Her approaches to representing maritime pasts are seen by some as part of the opening up of new horizons in maritime histories and transport history. In January 2009 The Times named Hello Sailor! Gay Life at Sea, the traveling exhibition she co-curated for Merseyside Maritime Museum, as their number one exhibition. Her books have twice been in the top five Alternative Bestsellers List. They are translated and reviewed worldwide and her work is particularly influential in Scandinavia. her blog on the gendered seas is one selected by the British Library to archive for posterity.

Born in the forester's house next door to John Ruskin’s Brantwood on Coniston Water, Jo Stanley grew up as part of a Liverpool family of the sea and railway workers. She then spent most of her adult life in London. Her 2005 Ph.D. at Lancaster University’s Centre for Cultural Research, Wanted! Adventurous Girls developed after listening to the stories of pioneering women seafarers, who were absent from all the male versions of seagoing that she had heard.

Her jobs have included life story artist in residence in hospices, lecturer, journalist, playwright, curator, shop steward, barmaid on Brighton's Palace Pier and artist's model. After residing in North London for several decades, she currently lives in West Yorkshire and works as a freelance author, consultant, and animator. She is an Honorary Research Fellow at Lancaster University's Centre for Mobilities Research and at the University of Hull's Maritime History Research Centre.

Her approach to historiography includes oral history, fiction and memoir creation, and working with story-givers on creating subjective maps of their past. She is also a textile artist specializing in re-texturising history by working with photographic images transferred to fabrics.

== Books and articles ==
As a campaigner for social justice, Stanley intentionally writes accessible popular as well as academic works . Her forthcoming books are:

1. Women at Sea, 1750-today: From Cabin ‘Boys’ to Captains, History Press, Stroud, 2016, ISBN 978-0-7524-8878-3.
2. Risk! Women on the Wartime Seas, Yale University Press, tba. 2013, ISBN 978-0-300-125764.
3. At Sea at Last! Women, Wrens, and the Royal Navy, 1917-2017, I.B. Tauris, 2017.

== Context ==
Stanley is part of an international move that challenges the (white, male, straight) Jolly Jack Tar stereotype in maritime historiography. The discipline is now taking an interdisciplinary turn towards cultural studies and mobilities.

New maritime history recognises that seafarers are workers who get wet. They are globalised travellers in their own right who can enjoy a mobility of identity that corresponds with their spatial mobility. They may well be black, Asian, queer and/or female. They, and the heterotopic spaces, on which they sail connect with land, not least through intimate relationships and maritime commerce. Therefore, this New Maritime History connects to Port Studies, the new discipline which in Britain is most active at Liverpool University's Centre for Port and Maritime History and Portsmouth University's hub: Port Towns and Urban Cultures.

The radical tendency in maritime history is popularly associated with controversial historian Marcus Rediker. Stanley is part of the international group of scholars who from the early 1980s opened up the subject of gender and the sea; they include Brit Berggren, Valerie Burton, Margaret S Creighton, Joan Druett, Lisa Norling and Suzanne J Stark.

Transport history, similarly, has recently turned towards pioneering women drivers, pilots and railworkers. Stanley's work on the sea parallels that of those path-breaking scholars such as Liz Millward on air; Margaret Walsh and Georgine Clarsen on roads; Helena Wojtczak and Dianne Drummond on rail.

She is also playing a prominent part in the recent move that connects queer studies to maritime history, along with the late US historian Allan Bérubé, and Swedish sociologist Arne Nilsson. Focusing on the mentalities of some such travellers, Stanley is experimenting with ideas about sex's connection of mobilities. She also argues that seafarers can be freshly understood using cultural studies lens connected with the gaze, identity, narrativity and auto/biography. Seafarers’ explorings of the world can express (and create) a desire to understand oneself through fresh eyes, and even try out ‘being’ a new self. Travelling can be a quest for all sorts of freedoms and knowledge, she holds.

== Selected works ==
- Hello Sailor! The Hidden History of Gay Life at Seafaring, (co-author Paul Baker), Pearson Education, London, 2002, ISBN 978-0582772144
- Writing out Your Life: A Guide to Writing Creative Autobiography, Scarlet Press, London, 1998, ISBN 1857270738
- Bold in Her Breeches: Women Pirates Across the Ages, ed, Pandora/HarperCollins, London, 1995, 1996, ISBN 0044409702; ISBN 978-0044409700
- Cultural Sniping: The Art of Transgression, (the collected writings of Jo Spence), literary ed, Routledge, London, 1995 ISBN 978-0-415-08884-8 (paperback) 978-0-415-08883-1.
