= Joan Druett =

New Zealand historian and writer

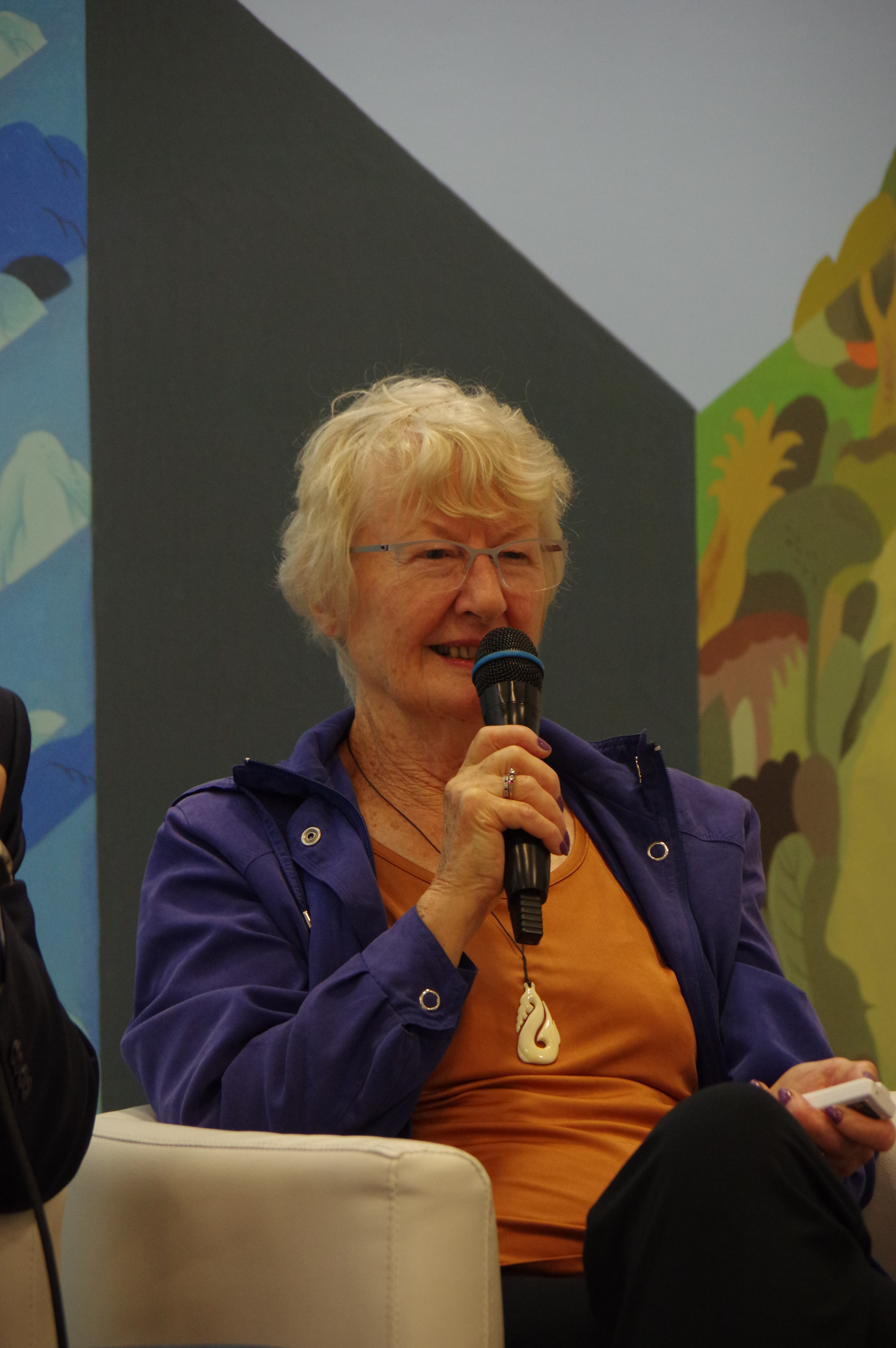
- Born: 11 April; Nelson, New Zealand
- Occupations: historian and novelist
- Writing career
- Pen name: Jo Friday
- Period: 1983–present
- Genres: Historical fiction, crime fiction
- Subject: Maritime history
- Website: members.authorsguild.net/druettjo/index.htm

Joan Druett is a New Zealand historian and novelist, specialising in maritime history and crime fiction.

== Life ==
Joan Druett was born in Nelson, and raised in Palmerston North, moving to New Zealand's capital city, Wellington, when she was 16. She gained her Bachelor of Arts in English literature from the Victoria University of Wellington, and then worked as a teacher of biology and English literature for many years before publishing her first full-length book when she was 40. She travelled extensively in her 20s – including to Canada, where she lived for a while, Britain and the Middle East.

She went to America as a Fulbright Scholar in 1986, and returned there in 1992 as historian/writer for a museum exhibit, "The Sailing Circle: Seafaring Women of New York," living in Orient, Long Island, where she and her husband, Ron, a maritime artist, were artists in residence at the William Steeple Davis Trust house and studio. While Ron painted and exhibited at galleries such as Mystic Seaport Gallery, she researched and wrote historical novels and books on maritime history. In late 1996, she and Ron returned to New Zealand, and set up house in Wellington in 1997. In 2001, she was the John David Stout Fellow at the Stout Research Centre for New Zealand Studies, Victoria University, and is still an associate.

She was married to the late Ron Druett (1934-2020) and has two sons, with also six grandchildren. Ron was a well-regarded maritime artist and illustrated many of her histories.

== Writing career ==
While her first novel wasn't published until she was 40 years old, Druett always wanted to write and had written professionally from her teen years. She wrote science fiction stories for American magazines, and stories for a Māori magazine using the pseudonym Jo Friday. She also did some freelance travel-writing.

Her first book, Exotic Intruders, was the result of a publisher's request for a book about the introduction to New Zealand of plants and animals by sailing ships. Since then she has written extensively in maritime history – particularly looking at wives at sea – and also historical and maritime novels.

In her later career, she has become best known for her Wiki Coffin novels, historical mysteries focusing on the eponymous half-Māori seaman protagonist. The Wiki character grew out of her research into real people, including descriptions of a Maori sailor in a midshipman's journal from the first half of the nineteenth century. In addition to the novels, Druett has also published several short stories featuring Wiki Coffin in Alfred Hitchcock's Mystery Magazine.

== Awards ==
- c.1983: Hubert Church Award for Exotic Intruders
- c.1983: PEN Award for Best First Book of Prose in New Zealand for Exotic Intruders
- 1986: Fulbright Award to carry out research at museums in New England and Hawaii
- 1992: John Lyman Award for Best Book of American Maritime History for She was a Sister Sailor, the Whaling Journals of Mary Brewster
- 1998: New York Public Library's 25 Best Books to Remember for Hen Frigates: Wives of Merchant Captains Under Sail
- 2000: L. Byrne Waterman Award, for contributions to maritime history and women's history
- 2001: John David Stout Fellow, Victoria University, Wellington, New Zealand
- 2012: NZPost Best General Non-Fiction Book Award, for Tupaia: the Remarkable Story of Captain Cook's Polynesian Navigator

== Selected works ==
=== Non-fiction ===
- (1983) Exotic Intruders: The Introduction of Plants and Animals to New Zealand. Auckland, NZ: Heinemann.
- (1988) Fulbright in New Zealand. Wellington, NZ: NZ-US Educational Foundation.
- (1991) Petticoat Whalers: Whaling Wives at Sea. Auckland, NZ: Collins
- (1992) She Was a Sister Sailor, the Whaling Journals of Mary Brewster, 1845–1851. Mystic Seaport Museum
- (1995) Captain's Daughter, Coasterman's Wife: Carrie Hubbard Davis of Orient. Orient, NY: Oysterponds Historical Society
- (1995) The Sailing Circle, 19th Century Seafaring Women from New York. (With Mary Anne Wallace.) Long Island: Three Village Historical Society & Cold Spring Harbor Whaling Museum
- (1998) Hen Frigates, Wives of Merchant Captains Under Sail. New York: Simon & Schuster ISBN 0684839687
- (2000) She Captains, Heroines and Hellions of the Sea. New York: Simon & Schuster. ISBN 0684856905
- (2001) Rough Medicine: Surgeons at Sea Under Sail. New York and London: Routledge
- (2003) In the Wake of Madness, the Murderous Voyage of the Whaleship Sharon. New York: Algonquin Books; Auckland: HarperCollins ISBN 1565123476
- (2007) Island of the Lost, Shipwrecked at the Edge of the World. New York: Algonquin; Sydney, Australia: Allen & Unwin ISBN 9781565124080
- (2010) Tupaia: Captain Cook's Polynesian Navigator. Santa Barbara, CA: Praeger; (2011) Auckland, New Zealand: Random House, ISBN 978-0313387487
- (2014) Eleanor's Odyssey: Journal of the Captain's Wife on the East Indiaman Friendship, 1799-1801. Old Salt Press. ISBN 0994115210
- (2015) Lady Castaways. Old Salt Press. ISBN 099411527X
- (2016) The Notorious Captain Hayes ~ The Remarkable True Story Of William 'Bully' Hayes, Pirate of The Pacific. Harper Collins Publishers, New Zealand, ISBN 978 1 7755 4097 7 (paperback), ISBN 978 1 7754 9135 4 (e-book)

=== Fiction ===
==== Wiki Coffin series ====
Historical crime series set during the United States Exploring Expedition through the Pacific Ocean by the United States Navy 1838–1842.

- A Watery Grave, 2004
- Shark Island, 2005
- Run Afoul, 2006
- Deadly Shoals, 2007
- "Brethren of the Sea" (AHMM, November 2004)
- "Fallen" (AHMM, January/February 2006)
- The Beckoning Ice, 2013, ISBN 9780992258832

==== Other fiction ====
- Abigail
- A promise of Gold
- Murder at the Brian Boru
- Daughters of the Storm
- Storm Swept
