= Ursulines of Quebec =

Ursuline
- Monastère des Ursulines de Québec
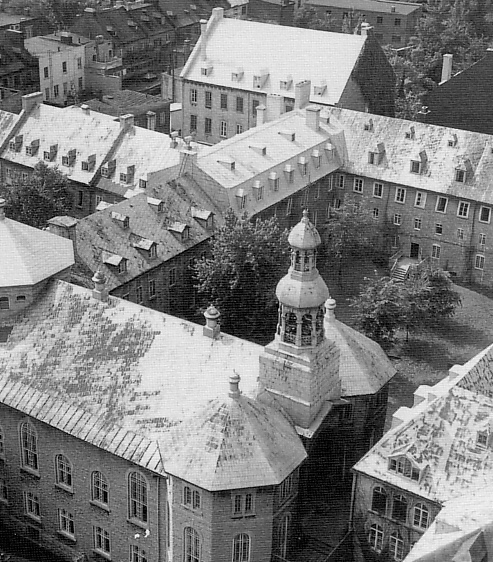

- Location within Quebec

Monastery information
- Order: Ursulines
- Established: 1639
- Mother house: Ursuline Monastery of Tours
- Diocese: Archdiocese of Quebec

People
- Founders: St. Marie of the Incarnation, O.S.U.
- Important associated figures: Mother Geneviève Boucher, O.S.U.; Jeanne Le Ber; St. Marie-Marguerite d'Youville, S.G.M.

Architecture
- Functional status: active
- Designated date: 1972
- Groundbreaking: 1641
- Completed date: 1642

Site
- Location: Quebec City, Quebec, Canada
- Coordinates: 46.812094°N 71.208127°W
- Public access: yes

National Historic Site of Canada

Museum of the Ursuline Monastery in Quebec City Musée des Ursulines de Québec
- Established: 1936
- Type: religious museum and teaching centre
- Website: www.polecultureldesursulines.ca

The Ursuline Monastery of Quebec City (French: Monastère des Ursulines de Québec) was founded by a missionary group of Ursuline nuns in 1639 under the leadership of Mother Marie of the Incarnation, O.S.U. It is the oldest institution of learning for women in North America. Today, the monastery serves as the General Motherhouse of the Ursuline Sisters of the Canadian Union. The community there also operates an historical museum and continues to serve as a teaching centre.

The complex was designated a National Historic Site of Canada in 1972.

== Background ==
The Ursulines are a Roman Catholic religious order founded at Brescia, Italy by Angela de Merici in 1535, primarily for the education of girls and the care of the sick and needy. Their patron saint is Saint Ursula.

The Viceroyalty of New France was the area colonized by France in North America starting with the exploration of the Saint Lawrence River by Jacques Cartier in 1534. The French explorer Samuel de Champlain founded the city of Québec in 1608 among the Algonquin people as the administrative seat for New France. Colonization was slow and difficult. Many settlers died early, because of harsh weather and diseases. In 1630, there were only 103 colonists living in the settlement, but, by 1640, there were 355.

== History ==
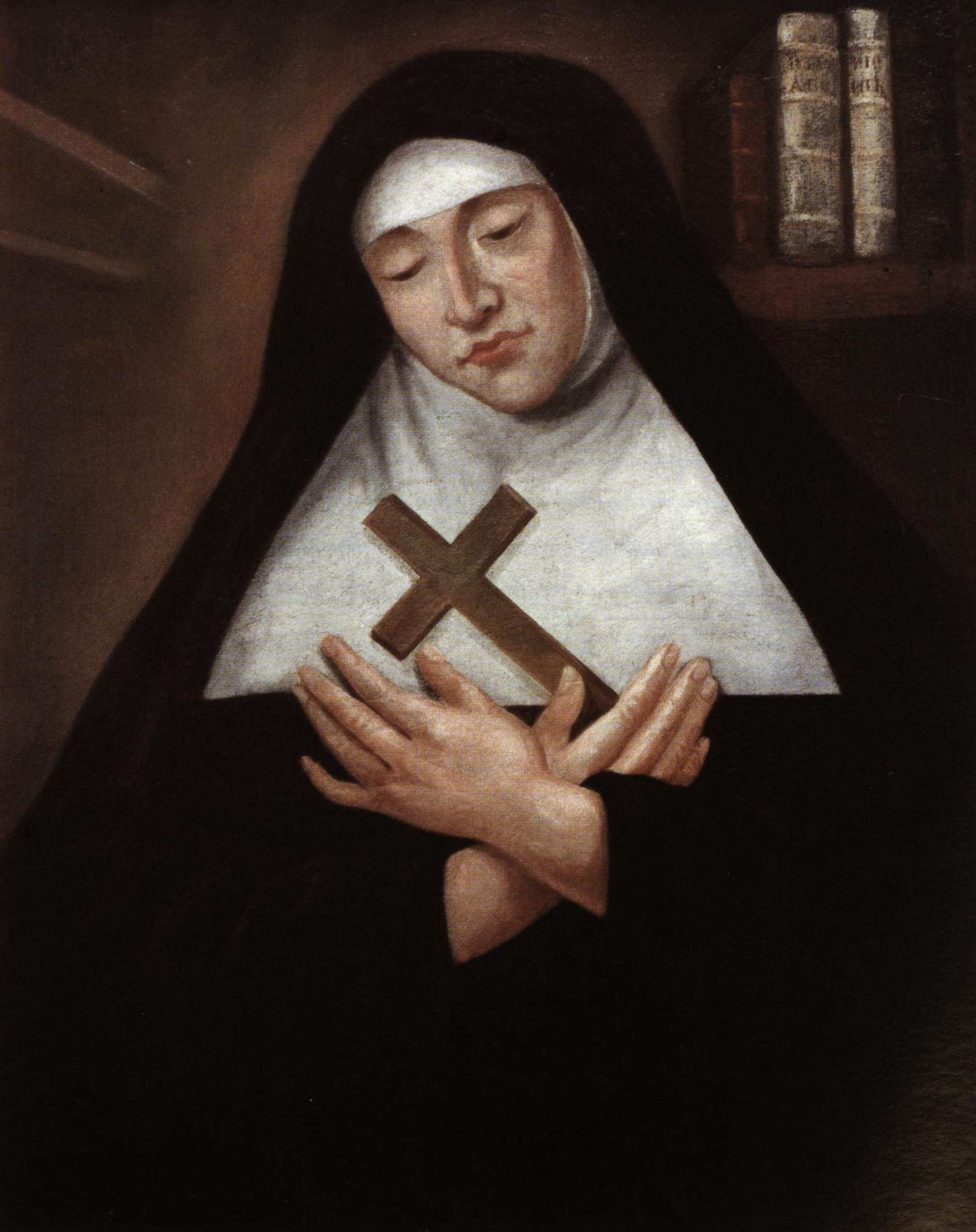
St. Marie of the Incarnation, O.S.U., Foundress of the Ursuline Monastery of Quebec

The Ursuline Sisters were the first Catholic nuns to land in New France (now known as Canada). The history of the Ursulines in Quebec begins on 1 August 1639, when its first members landed in Canada. The monastery was established under the leadership of Mother (now Saint) Marie of the Incarnation (1599–1672), an Ursuline nun of the monastery in Tours, and Madame Marie-Madeline de Chauvigny de la Peltrie (1603–1671), a rich widow from Alençon in Normandy. The letters patent sanctioning the foundation issued by King Louis XIII are dated 1639.

When they arrived in the summer of 1639, the nuns studied the languages of the native peoples and then began to educate the native children. They taught reading and writing as well as needlework, embroidery, drawing and other domestic arts.

After three years spent in the Lower Town of Quebec City, the nuns moved to a new monastery built on ground ceded to them by the Company of New France. Their first pupils were Indian girls, with whom they succeeded better than the Jesuits with their native boys. The first monastery burned down in 1650, but was soon rebuilt. The community was attacked by the Iroquois in 1661–2, when one of its chaplains, the Sulpician Abbé Vignal, was slain and devoured near Montreal.

The Constitutions, written by Father Jérôme Lalemant (1593–1673), uncle of the Jesuit martyr Gabriel Lalemant, combined the rules of the two Congregations of Paris and Bordeaux, and were observed until Bishop François de Laval decided in 1681 in favour of the former, which binds its members by a fourth vow to teach girls.

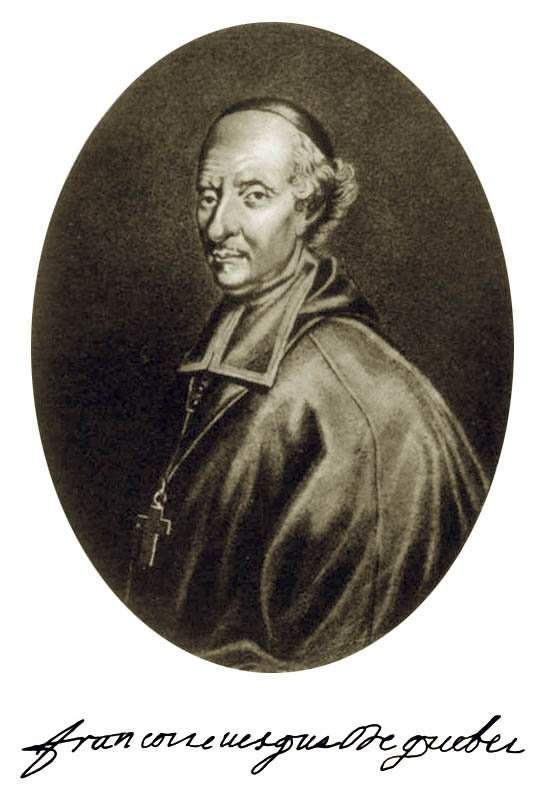
St. François de Laval, first bishop of New France (1659–1684)

The monastery endured the siege and bombardment of Quebec under William Phips in 1690, and a second siege by James Wolfe on 13 September 1759, known as the Battle of the Plains of Abraham, where the garrison of Quebec was defeated by Wolfe's army. After the battle, the French governor, Montcalm, who had died in it was buried by night in the monastery chapel. The first English governor, Murray, used part of the monastery as his headquarters. On that occasion the rations served to the nuns for nursing the wounded and sick saved them from perishing of starvation. The governors and viceroys, both English and French, were always friendly to the institution.

The Quebec Monastery founded new communities at Three Rivers in 1697, Roberval in 1882, Stanstead in 1884, and Rimouski, with a normal school, in 1906, besides sending missionaries to New Orleans in 1822, Charlestown (Boston) in 1824, Galveston in 1849 and Montana in 1893.

== Development and expansion ==
The Ursuline Monastery of Quebec, established in 1639, founded the following monasteries and convents which were autonomous until 1953:

- Monastery of Trois-Rivières: (1697)
  - Waterville, 1888–1892
  - Skowhegan, 1899-1900 (Maine, USA)
  - Grand-Mère, 1900–1972
  - Shawinigan, 1908–1977
  - Trois-Rivières, Christ-Roi Monastery, 1939–1996
- Monastery of Roberval: 1882–2002. (Residence since 2002 at the Augustines de la Miséricorde de Jésus in Roberval; and other foundations)
- Monastery of Stanstead: 1884–2004. (Residence in Magog since 2004)
- Monastery of Rimouski: 1906–1970, the Ursuline Monastery became the Université du Québec à Rimouski
- Monastere De Gaspe: in 1924–1970,
  - St-Simon, 1951–1970
  - Anses-aux-Gascons, 1950 -1964
  - Monastère d'Amqui, 1946–1972
  - Hakodate, Japan, 1948,
    - Hachinohe, 1950
  - Matane, 1950
  - St-Léon-le-Grand, 1952
  - Maillardville, B.C., 1952–1968
- Sendai, Japan, 1936
  - Tamonoki, 1967
  - Tokyo, 1972
  - Yagi, 1974–2004
- Loretteville: Boarding School, 1941–1997; Day School 1941
- Jacquet River, 1945–1971
- St-Léonard, N.-B. 1947-1987

The era is coming to a close. Article from Globe and Mail, July 26, 2018. Of 52 sisters only four will remain when 48 move to a care facility in September 2018. "When the last nuns pad out the door, it will not be easy to return. The massive wooden door to the Ursuline Monastery only has a doorknob on the inside. It was designed to keep outsiders from getting in. Ultimately, though, it could not keep out the realities of advancing age and a secular world."

== Notable people ==
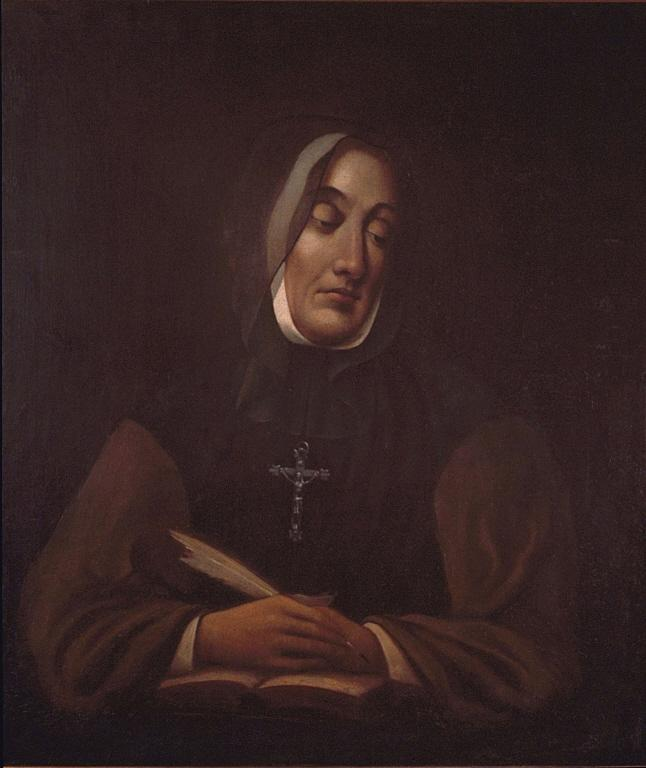
Marie-Marguerite d'Youville (1701–1771), founder of the Grey Nuns

Mother Marie of the Incarnation, the foundress, practiced devotion to the Sacred Heart of Jesus, and had established it in the cloister years before the revelation to St. Margaret Mary Alacoque (1647–1690). The first celebration of the feast in the New World took place in the monastery on 18 June 1700. The register of the Confraternity of the Sacred Heart begins in 1716. Pope Clement XI (1718) enriched it with indulgences. Mother Marie mastered the local languages and composed dictionaries in Algonquin and Iroquois, a sacred history in Algonquin, and a catechism in Iroquois.

Geneviève Boucher, more commonly known as Mère de Saint-Pierre, (1676–1766) served in the Order for over 60 years and is referred to in its annals as a "perfect Ursuline" and "the Methuselah of our history". Anne Bourdon, known as Mère de Sainte-Agnès (1644–1711), was the first Canadian-born superior for the order.

The first superior elected after the conquest of the colony by England (1760) was Esther Wheelwright, a New England captive, rescued from the Abenakis by the Jesuit Father Bigot, and a protégée of the first governor, Vaudreuil. The Irish, Scottish and American elements in Canada have given distinguished subjects to this cloister, prominent among whom was Mother Cecilia O'Conway of the Incarnation, the first Philadelphia nun, one of St. Elizabeth Ann Seton's earliest associates. The list of alumnae includes Jeanne Le Ber (1662–1714), the saintly "recluse of Montreal", and Saint Marie-Marguerite d'Youville (1701–1771), foundress of the Grey Sisters at Montreal.

During the French Revolution (1789–1799) several French refugees were chaplains to the monastery, the most notable being Abbé L.P. Desjardins, who died in France as the Vicar General of the Archdiocese of Paris. Through him were procured the valuable paintings by Philippe de Champaigne, Charles Le Brun, Hyacinthe Collin de Vermont, Pietro da Cortona and others, that adorn the chapel.

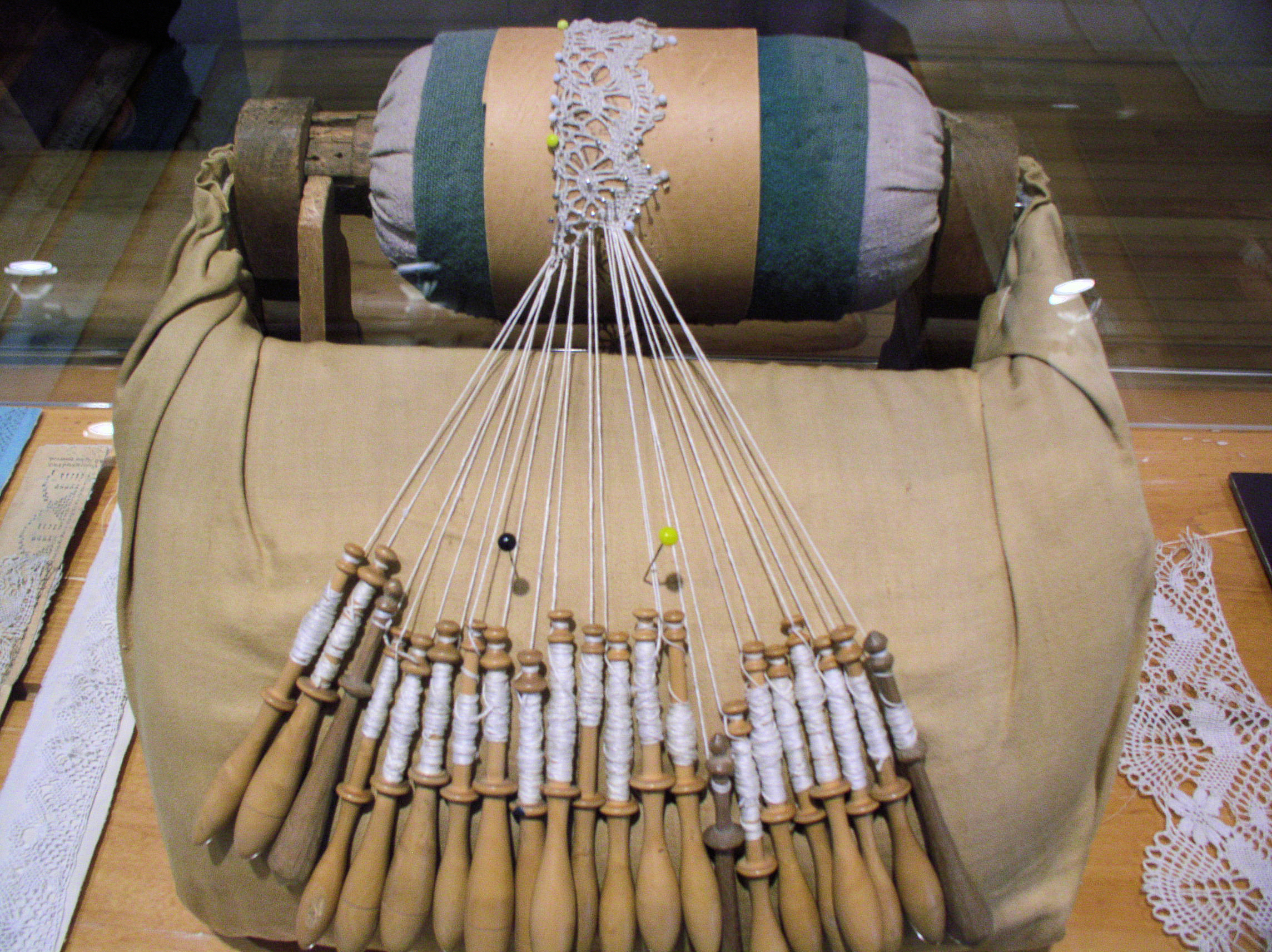
Ursuline lace

== Affiliations ==
The Museum is affiliated with the CMA, CHIN and Virtual Museum of Canada.
