= Marie-Madeleine de Chauvigny de la Peltrie =

French woman who started the Order of Ursulines of Quebec

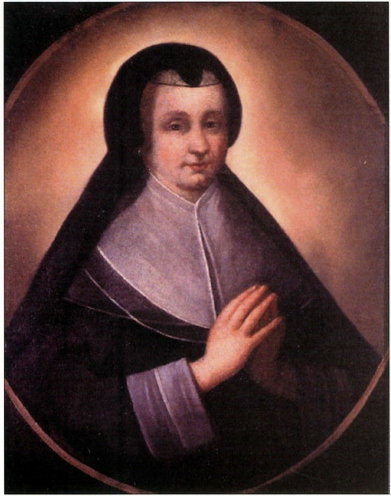
Marie-Madeleine de Chauvigny de la Peltrie

Marie-Madeleine de Chauvigny de la Peltrie (1603 – 18 November 1671) was a French woman who started the Order of Ursulines of Quebec.

Chauvigny, Marie-Madeleine de (Gruel de La Peltrie), secular founder of the Ursulines of Quebec, born in Alençon (France) in 1603, daughter of Guillaume de Chauvigny, lord of the said place and of Vaubougon, and of Damsel Jeanne Du Bouchet, deceased in Quebec on November 18, 1671.

Guillaume de Chauvigny, having had no son to succeed him, wanted to prepare distinguished alliances for his daughters. Marie-Madeleine, the youngest, despite her attraction to the cloister, was forced to marry the Chevalier de Gruel, Lord of La Peltrie. From this alliance, which lasted only five years, was born a daughter who died in the cradle. Widowed at the age of 22, Madame de La Peltrie devoted herself in a particular way to the practice of virtue. She even withdrew into solitude to avoid the solicitations of her father, eager to find her a second husband.

At that time, the Jesuit Relation of 1635 fell before his eyes and the appeal of Father Paul Le Jeune in favor of the missions of New France seemed to him personally addressed: “Alas mon Dieu! he wrote, if the excesses, if the superfluities, of a few Ladies of France were employed in this most holy work [the founding of a convent of teaching nuns in Quebec], what a great blessing would they bestow upon their families! From that moment, Madame de La Peltrie conceived the plan of devoting her person and her fortune to the conversion of the Amerindians.

But a serious illness hampered her plans and led her to the gates of the tomb. While the doctors thought she was lost and only visited her by ceremony, she made a vow to Saint Joseph, promising him, in return for health, to go to Canada, to build a house there under his patronage and to dedicate herself to the service of little Native American girls. The next day, against everyone's expectations, she found herself without fever, resolved to fulfill her promises. New attack from her father more determined than ever to marry her. Several people encouraged her to give in to paternal desires, but she found an ingenious way to calm M. de Vaubougon's anxieties: a fictitious marriage with M. Jean de Bernières de Louvigny, treasurer of France in Caen, who later, became procurator of the Ursulines of Quebec. This gentleman agreed to play the comedy. In the meantime, M. de Vaubougon died and Mme de La Peltrie's affairs became complicated: finding her unable to administer her fortune, her parents tried to put her under interdiction. She appealed to the Parliament of Rouen, won her case and, as a result, the management of her patrimony.

Pressed to leave for New France, Madame de La Peltrie went to Paris and consulted Monsieur Vincent and Father de Condren, arbiters of apostolic undertakings. She was introduced to Father Poncet de La Rivière, a Jesuit, who spoke to her about Marie de l'Incarnation [V. Guyart], also consumed by the desire to go to Canada. Mme de La Peltrie and M. de Bernières de Louvigny went to Tours and the affair of the foundation was soon concluded. In Madame de La Peltrie, Marie de l'Incarnation recognized the companion who had been shown to her in a dream. In Paris, the foundress signed the deed which ensured the foundation of the land of Haranvilliers, near Alençon, a bequest representing an income of approximately 900 livres. Unable to place her luggage on ships bound for America, Madame de La Peltrie had a ship chartered at her own expense, loading it with provisions and furniture at a cost of 8,000 livres. To her caravan made up of three Ursulines, she joined a 19-year-old girl, Charlotte Barré, who would become the first professed of the monastery of Quebec, under the name of Mother Saint-Ignace.

Upon landing at Quebec on August 1, 1639, Madame de La Peltrie began to exercise her zeal for the conversion of the Amerindians. She was everywhere, striving to multiply bodily and spiritual works of mercy. The little Amerindian girls followed her with more love than children follow their own mother. Although of a delicate constitution, she employed herself in the most humble offices, wishing to be of all good works. These aspirations to the most perfect explain his flight to Montreal with Jeanne Mance and Paul de Chomedey .de Maisonneuve, in the spring of 1642. Deprived of income, furniture and above all the presence of their foundress, the Ursulines had great difficulty holding on. After 18 months of an absence capable of annihilating the mission of the Ursulines, Mme de La Peltrie returned to her daughters. At the opening of the novitiate (1646), she asked the favor of being admitted into the company of Sainte-Ursule; but the trial was short-lived. She resumed her secular habits, continued to live in the cloister and keep all monastic observances.

On several occasions, Marie de l'Incarnation praised Madame de La Peltrie, whom she called “a saint”. On November 12, 1671, the foundress was stricken with pleurisy which killed her on the seventh day. The day after her death, she was placed in a lead coffin and buried in the Ursuline chapel. In accordance with her last wishes, her heart was given to the Jesuits, as a strange token of the respect and affection she had always had for their company

== Legacy ==
In 1739 some of the infirmary’s silver pieces, which had belonged in large part to Mme de La Peltrie, were given to make a sanctuary lamp.

The Musée des Ursulines de Québec is located in a building just outside the walls of the monastery, on the foundations of the house of the community’s benefactress, Madeleine Chauvigny of Peltrie (1603-1671).
