= Marie of the Incarnation (Ursuline) =

French Catholic nun (1599–1672)

Saint Marie of the Incarnation OSU
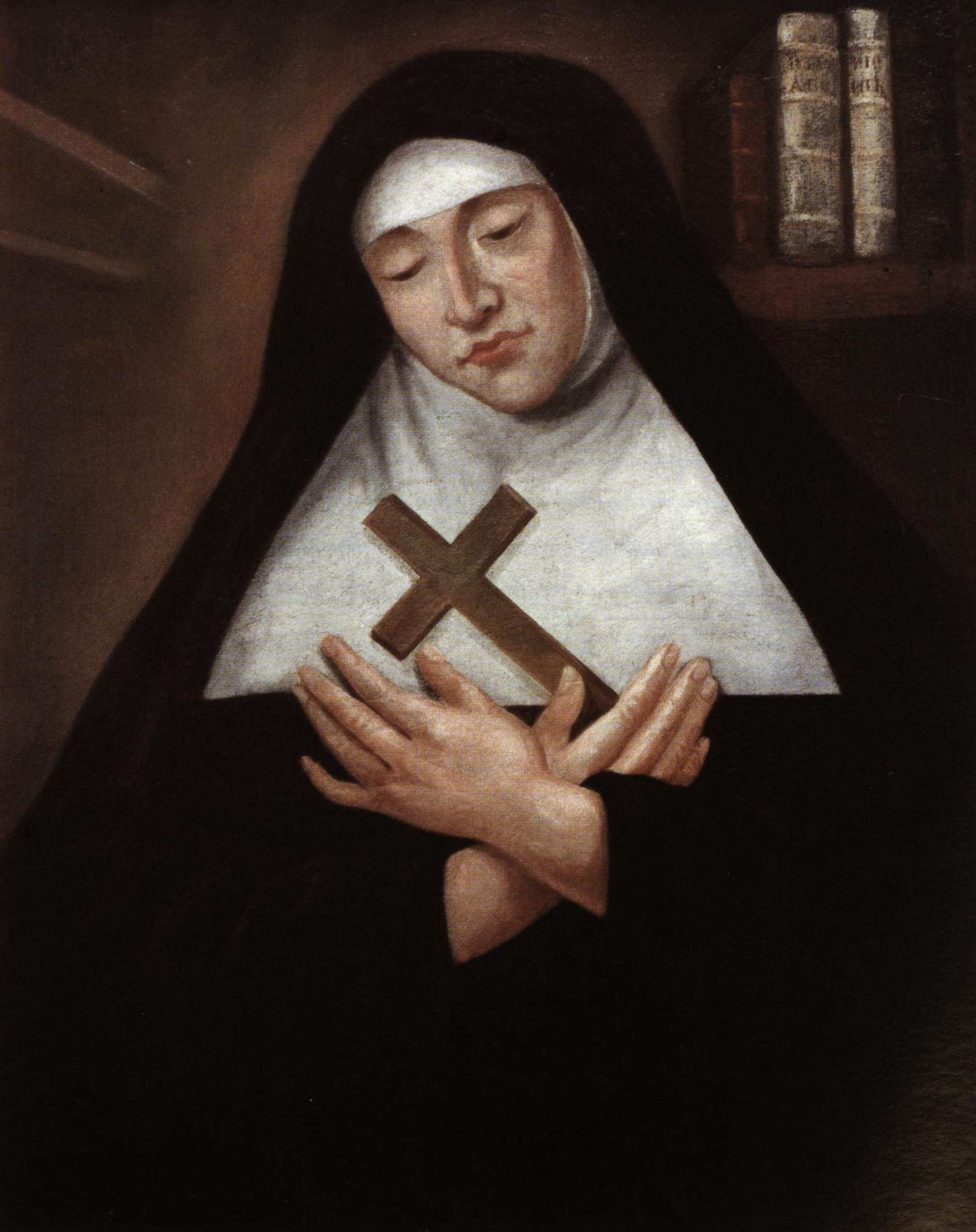
- Portrait attributed to Abbé Hugues Pommier (1637–1686)

Virgin
- Born: Marie Guyart; 28 October 1599; Tours, Touraine, Kingdom of France
- Died: 30 April 1672 (aged 72); Quebec City, Canada, New France
- Venerated in: Catholic Church and Anglican Church of Canada
- Beatified: 22 June 1980, Saint Peter's Basilica, Vatican City, by Pope John Paul II
- Canonized: 3 April 2014, Apostolic Palace, Vatican City, by Pope Francis
- Major shrine: Centre Marie-de-l'Incarnation, Québec, Canada
- Feast: 30 April
- Attributes: Ursuline habit, crucifix

Marie of the Incarnation OSU (née Marie Guyart; 28 October 1599 – 30 April 1672) was a French Ursuline nun from Quebec City. As part of a group of nuns sent to New France (modern-day Quebec, Canada) to establish the Ursuline Order, Marie was crucial in the spread of Catholicism in New France. She was a religious author and has been credited with founding the first girls' school in the New World. A skilled creative, Marie wrote many letters, learned Indigenous languages, practiced embroidery and needlework, and spread her faith.

Due to her work, the Catholic Church declared her a saint, and the Anglican Church of Canada celebrates her with a feast day.

== Early life ==
She was born Marie Guyart in Tours, France. Her father was a baker. She was the fourth of Florent Guyart and Jeanne Michelet's eight children. From an early age she was drawn to religious liturgy and the sacraments. When Marie was seven years old, she recounted her first mystical encounter with Jesus Christ. In her book Relation, of 1654 she recounted: "...with my eyes toward heaven, I saw our Lord Jesus Christ in human form come forth and move through the air to me. As Jesus in his wondrous majesty was approaching me, I felt my heart enveloped by his love and I began to extend my arms to embrace him. Then he put his arms about me, kissed me lovingly, and said, 'Do you wish to belong to me?' I answered, 'Yes!' And having received my consent, he ascended back into Heaven." From that point onward, Marie felt "inclined towards goodness."

Intent on belonging to Christ, Marie, aged fourteen, proposed to her parents that she enter religious life with the Benedictines of Beaumont Abbey but her parents disregarded her desire. Instead, she was married to Claude Martin, a master silk worker in 1617. By her own account, she enjoyed a happy—although brief—marriage and within two years she had a son, also named Claude. Her husband died only six months after the birth of their son, leaving Marie a widow at the age of nineteen.

With her husband's death, Guyart inherited his failing business which she then lost. Forced to move into her parents' home, Guyart secluded herself to pursue a deepening of her commitment to spiritual growth. After a year with her parents, Guyart was invited to move in with her sister and brother-in-law, Paul Buisson, who owned a successful transportation business. She accepted, and helped in managing their house and kitchen.

Nothing could distract Guyart from the pursuit of a spiritual life. "I was constantly occupied by my intense concentration on God..." she wrote in Relation of 1633. Over time, her inclination toward religious life only grew and eventually led her to enter the Ursuline convent on 25 January 1631.

=== Religious beginnings ===
Free to pursue her religious inclinations after her husband's death, Guyart took a vow of chastity, obedience, and poverty. On 24 March 1620, she reported a religious vision that set her on a new path of devotional intensity.

"I saw at some distance to my left a little church of white marble ... the Blessed Virgin was seated. She was holding the Child Jesus on her lap. This place was elevated, and below it lay a majestic and vast country, full of mountains, of valleys, of thick mists which permeated everything except the church ... The Blessed Virgin, Mother of God, looked down on this country, as pitiable as it was amazing ... it seamed to me that she spoke about this country and about myself and that she had in mind some plan which involved me." —the vision of Marie Guyart as recorded in her work, 'Relation'

In 1627 Guyart read and found a role model in the autobiographical account, Vida, about the Spanish mystic Teresa of Ávila. She found many spiritual connections with Teresa, and was heavily influenced by her work. Guyart aspired to travel to the New World and becoming a martyr there. Fueled by Jesuit teachings and her own visions, Guyart became more and more encouraged to travel to New France. So much so, she recorded a vision that would inspire her voyage to the New World. With the assistance of her spiritual director, Guyart identified the country in her vision to be Canada and further incentivized her departure to New France. Despite never achieving martyrdom, Guyart would spend many years in the New World aspiring towards it, working diligently in the meantime. After her death, the two names would often be connected, and Marie would occasionally be referred to as the Teresa of Canada.

In 1631, after working with a spiritual director for many years, Guyart decided to enter the Ursuline monastery in Tours to answer her religious vocation. At that time she received the religious name by which she is now known. Joining the monastery required her to leave her young son, and he expressed much difficulty with the separation. Claude tried to storm the monastery with a band of school friends, and could repeatedly be found crying at the gates, trying to enter. She left him in the care of the Buisson family, but the emotional pain of the separation would remain with them both. Later, when her son had become a Benedictine monk, they corresponded candidly about their spiritual and emotional trials.

== New France ==
=== Pre-departure ===
Prior to her departure, Guyart had been leading a cloistered life as a member of the Ursuline Order. After having professed her vows in 1633, she changed her name to Marie de L'Incarnation; that Christmas, she recounted a powerful vision, which functioned as the catalyst for her mission to New France. In this mystical dream, Guyart saw herself walking hand in hand with a fellow laywoman against the backdrop of a foreign landscape. On the roof of a small church in this distant, foggy landscape sat the Virgin Mary and Jesus; she interpreted this as the mother and son discussing her religious calling to the new land. She recounted the vision to her priest at the Order, who informed her that the nation she described was Canada, and suggested that she read The Jesuit Relations; from this Guyart concluded that her vocation was to help establish the Catholic faith in the New World.

Personal and financial obstacles delayed her departure by four years. Over this time, she maintained a continuous correspondence with Jesuits in Quebec who were supportive of a female religious presence, which might facilitate the Christianization of Huron women; Guyart's Mother Superior in Tours, and her pre-Ursuline religious director Raymond de Saint Bernard were largely unsupportive, the latter suggesting that it was too lofty for a lowly laywoman. Guyart was met with similar resistance from her family. Her brother, Claude Guyart attempted to persuade her into abandoning her mission by accusing her of parental neglect, and by revoking an inheritance designated for her son; these measures did not deter her.

Guyart's initial financial concerns for the funding of the journey, and the establishment of a convent in New France were resolved when she was introduced to Madeleine de la Peltrie on 19 February 1639. Guyart recognized that this religiously devoted widow, the daughter of a fiscal officer, was the laywoman from her vision four years earlier. De la Peltrie's contribution to the endeavor was met with strong opposition from her aristocratic family; to garner their support, de la Peltrie arranged a sham marriage with Christian Jean de Brenière. De la Peltrie's new marital status gave her the legal authority to sign over the bulk of her estate to the Ursuline Order, thereby fully funding the mission. Following this, the Ursuline went to Paris, and signed legal contracts with the Company of One Hundred Associates, and the Jesuit Fathers, who were responsible for the colony's political and spiritual life, respectively. The official royal charter sanctioning the establishment of the foundation was signed by Louis XIII shortly thereafter.

On 4 May 1639, Guyart and de la Peltrie, set sail from Dieppe for Quebec on board the Saint Joseph. They were accompanied by a fellow aristocratic Ursuline Marie de Sanonières, the young commoner Charlotte Barré, three nurses, and two Jesuit Fathers.

=== Arrival ===
On 1 August 1639, the group landed in Quebec City and established a convent in the lower town. When they began their first work at the foot of the mountain, Quebec was but a name. Hardly six houses stood on the site chosen by Champlain thirty-one years previously. She and her companions at first occupied a little house in the lower town (Basse-Ville). In 1642 the Ursulines moved to a permanent stone building in the upper town. The group managed to found the first school in what would become Canada, as well as the Ursuline Monastery of Quebec, which has been designated one of the National Historic Sites of Canada.

==== Early interactions with the native populations ====
Guyart's early interactions with Native populations were largely shaped by the constraints created by differing lifestyles, illnesses, and alliances. Indigenous divisions of manual and domestic labour by gender and age diverged significantly from European conceptions of masculine and feminine spheres of work. This made it difficult for Marie and the other Ursulines to educate young girls with methods developed in Europe.

With European colonization came an influx of illnesses. Smallpox outbreaks from the 1630s to the 1650s ravaged Native populations, leading them to believe that Jesuits and Ursulines were imparting disease through their religious practices and paraphernalia. Fears that baptisms, holy icons, and crosses were the source of all epidemics greatly limited the groups' interactions, and strained Marie's relationship with Natives in her first decades in New France.

The most volatile relationship Guyart and the Ursulines faced revolved around the conflict that pitted the French, Huron, and other indigenous allies against the Iroquois. Iroquois hostility towards the Jesuit-allied Hurons shaped Guyart's negative view of the Five Nations. Iroquois military victories in the 1650s, and their dominance by the start of the next decade, brought Guyart and the Ursulines close to despair. Their distress was heightened by a fire that destroyed their convent in 1650. Simultaneous political troubles in France caused European Ursulines to pressure their Canadian sisters to return home, adding to Guyart and the Ursulines' stresses, and fears. Such feelings of helplessness were quelled, however, when the convent was reconstructed with seemingly miraculous speed; a blessing attributed to the Virgin Mary.

==== Universalizing Impulses ====
A strong, universalizing impulse underscored Guyart's interactions, and activities in New France. Her perceptions of similarities between European Christians, and the potential converts in the New World were the upshots of a cloistered convent life, and largely non-existent experiences with other cultures; such seclusion allowed for an over-simplification of her ambition to spread God's word transnationally. According to Natalie Zemon Davis, the integrative approach towards Native interactions that developed from this mindset was dissimilar to the Jesuit's methods of establishing relationships in New France. Jesuits adopted Native roles in the presence of First Nations peoples, but were quick to shed these association when outside the confines of their settlements; this double life made any fully integrative experience, or universal mindset impossible.

Guyart considered Native girls submissive and conscientious, and hoped that as a result they would be quick to adopt Christian practices and make Christian marriages, resulting in a thorough, universalizing conversion.

==== Education ====
Religious education was a key pillar of education in the 17th century. Marie followed a strict orthodox teaching method she had learnt during her time with the Ursulines in Tours. The system was based on basics of faith, French and Latin literature, and civility. The basics of faith included catechism, prayers, and hymns. The main objective of the Ursuline school was to educate young French girls and Natives to become good Christians. The young French girls paid one hundred and twenty livres to cover both their education and pension fees. At the time, the young Native girls did not have to pay for their education. The Ursuline's encouraged the young Innu, Hurons, and Algonquins to use the seminary as a resource. These girls were taught French mannerisms and were taught how to dress based on French culture. After their education, the young aboriginal students were encouraged to go back to their homes and share their teachings. By educating young girls from different tribes, francization was transmitted from daughter to mother. In her writings, Guyart emphasized the fact that the Aboriginal students were treated the same way as the French students at the school. They allowed the girls to sing hymns in both French and their native languages. Many of the nuns created mother-like bonds with the First Nation students. There were, however, some problems with the education system during the 17th century. Some students did not stay at the school long enough to receive a complete education. The Ursuline nuns did not have the authority to keep them if the girls wanted to leave. Another problem was limited economic resources. The school could only accept a limited number of students because of a lack of funds.

== Death ==
Guyart died of a liver illness on 30 April 1672. In the necrology report sent to the Ursulines of France, it was written: "The numerous and specific virtues and excellent qualities which shone through this dear deceased, make us firmly believe that she enjoys a high status in God's glory."

== Works ==
In addition to her religious duties, Guyart composed multiple works that reflected her experiences and observations during her time in the New World and the spiritual calling that led her there.

In relation to her work with the indigenous population, Guyart learned the Innu-aimun, Algonquin, Wyandot, and Iroquois languages, writing dictionaries and catechisms in each (none of which are extant), as well as in her native French. Marie also wrote two autobiographies, though her second Relation was destroyed in a fire at the convent while still in manuscript.

Her most significant writings, however, were the 8,000–20,000 letters she wrote to various acquaintances, the majority of which went to her son Claude. Despite being personal correspondence, some of her letters were circulated throughout France and appeared in The Jesuit Relation in love while she was still alive. Many of the remainder were then published by her son after her death. These letters constitute one of the sources for the history of the French colony from 1639 to 1671. Her collection of works discuss political, commercial, religious, and interpersonal aspects of the colony and are helpful in the reconstruction and understanding of New France in the seventeenth century.

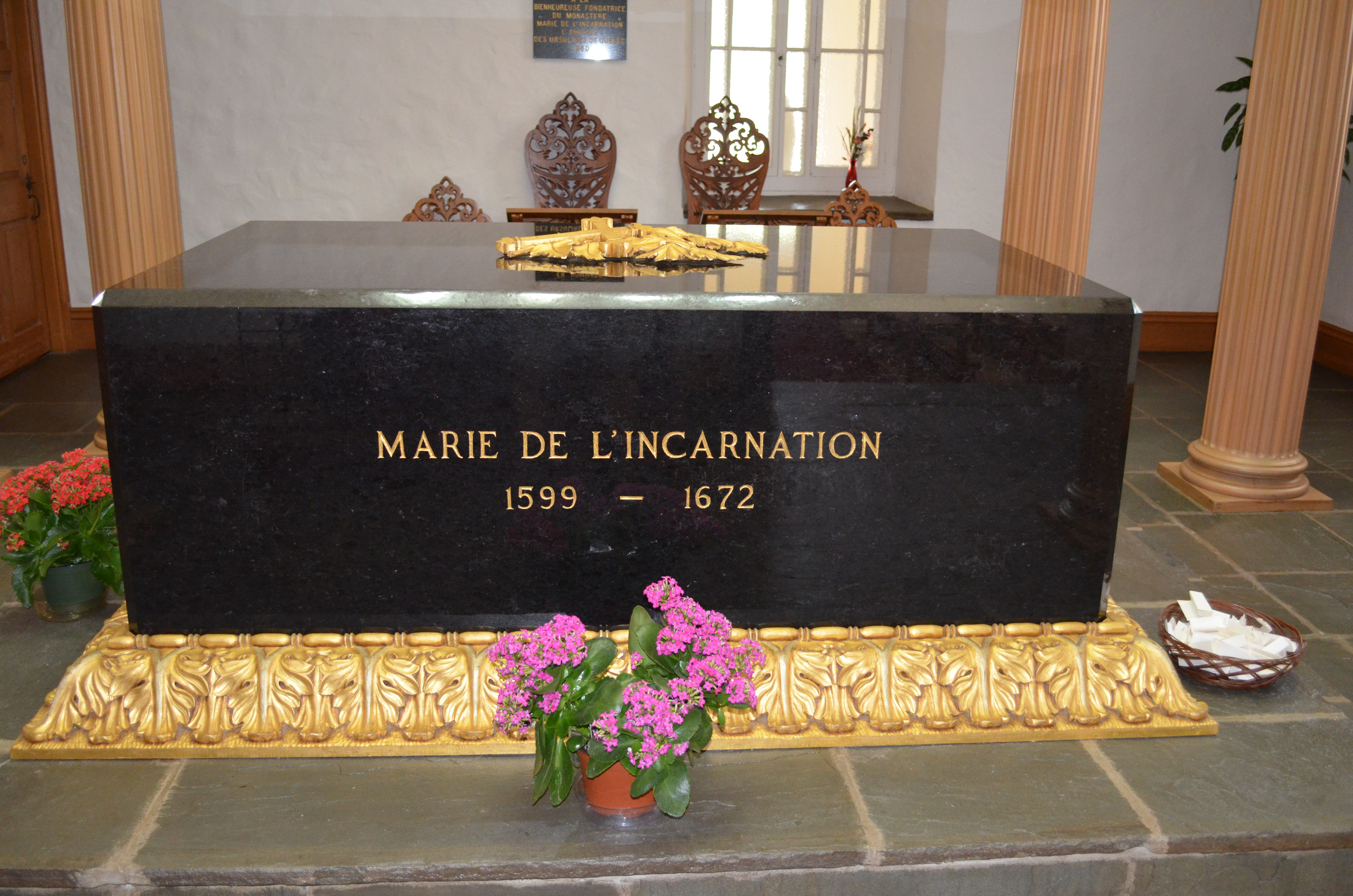
Coffin of Marie de l'Incarnation

== Canonization ==
Guyart's canonization cause was formally opened by the Vatican on 27 September 1877, granting her the title of Servant of God. Her spiritual writings were approved by theologians on 10 June 1895, and she was declared Venerable by Pope Pius X on 19 July 1911. She was beatified by Pope John Paul II on 22 June 1980. She was canonized by Pope Francis on 2 April 2014. The Pontiff waived the requirement of two miracles for Guyart, and she was granted equipollent canonization alongside François de Laval, the first Bishop of Quebec.

== Legacy ==
Marie of the Incarnation is a celebrated founder of the Ursuline Order in colonial New France. Her work with the Amerindians has also been recognized by the Anglican Church of Canada, which celebrates her life with a feast day on 30 April. A number of Catholic schools have been named after her. At Laval University, in Québec City, there is the Centre d'Études Marie de l'Incarnation, that is a multi-disciplinary program pertaining to theology and religious practice.

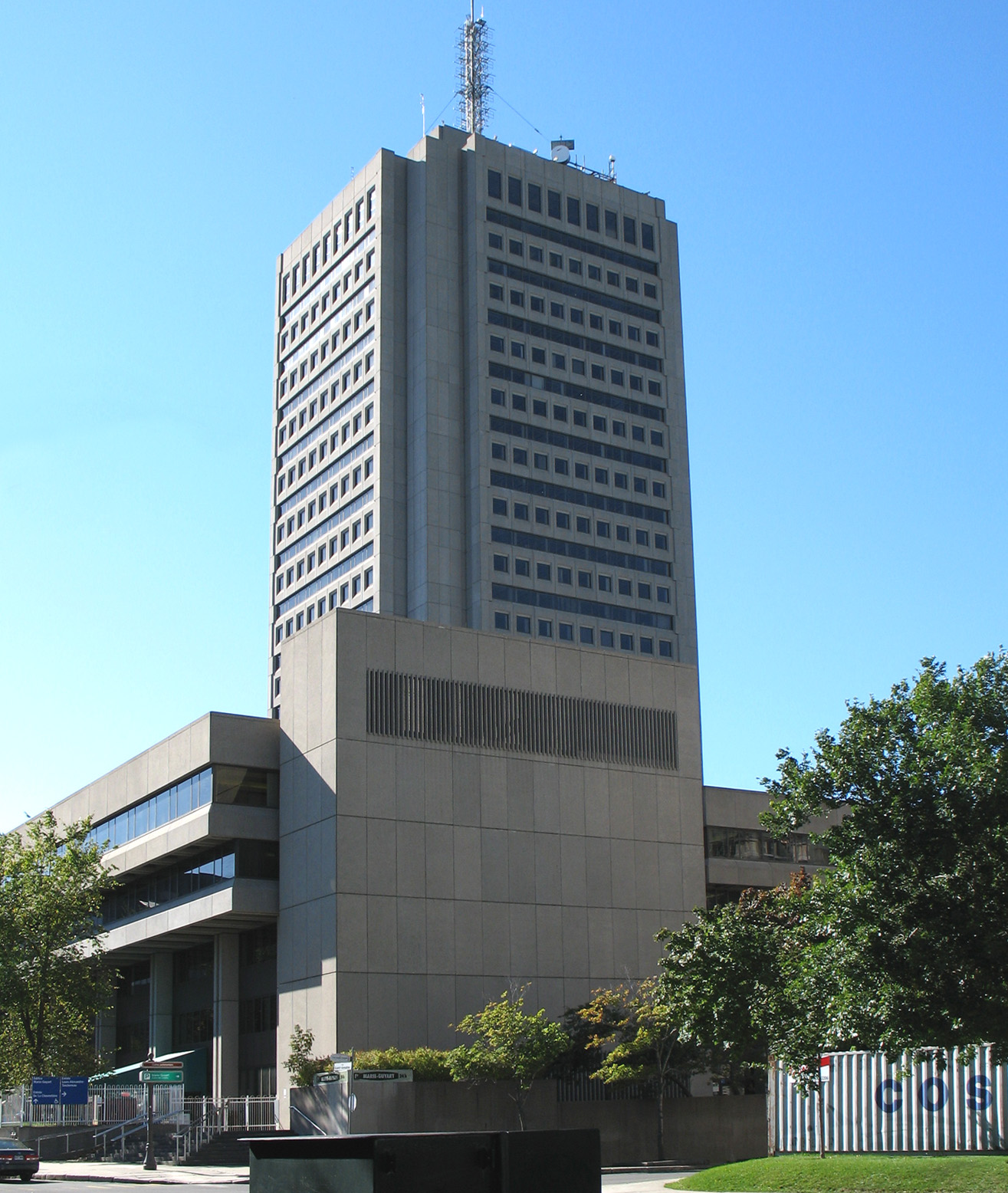
Édifice Marie-Guyart, Québec

Guyart is memorialized by a statue erected in front of the Québec parliament. The sculpture was designed by Joseph-Émile Brunet in 1965 and is located at the Basilica of Saint Anne de Beaupré.

Guyart's life story was adapted into a documentary-drama by Jean-Daniel Lafond, entitled Folle de Dieu (Madwoman of God) (2008). The film starred Marie Tifo as Guyart and was produced by the National Film Board of Canada. Tifo also played the role of Guyart in the 2009 stage production La Déraison d'a'Aur.

Guyart was portrayed by Karen Elkin in the 2020 film The Mother Eagle (Le Sang du pélican).

== See also ==
- Ursulines of Quebec
- Grandbois, Michèle. Quebec City Art & Artists: An Illustrated History, 2025. Toronto: Art Canada Institute.

== Sources ==
- Davis, Natalie Zemon (1997) [1995]. Women on the margins : three seventeenth-century lives. Cambridge, Massachusetts: Harvard University Press. ISBN 978-0-674-95521-9. OCLC 889235527.
