= List of venerated American Catholics =

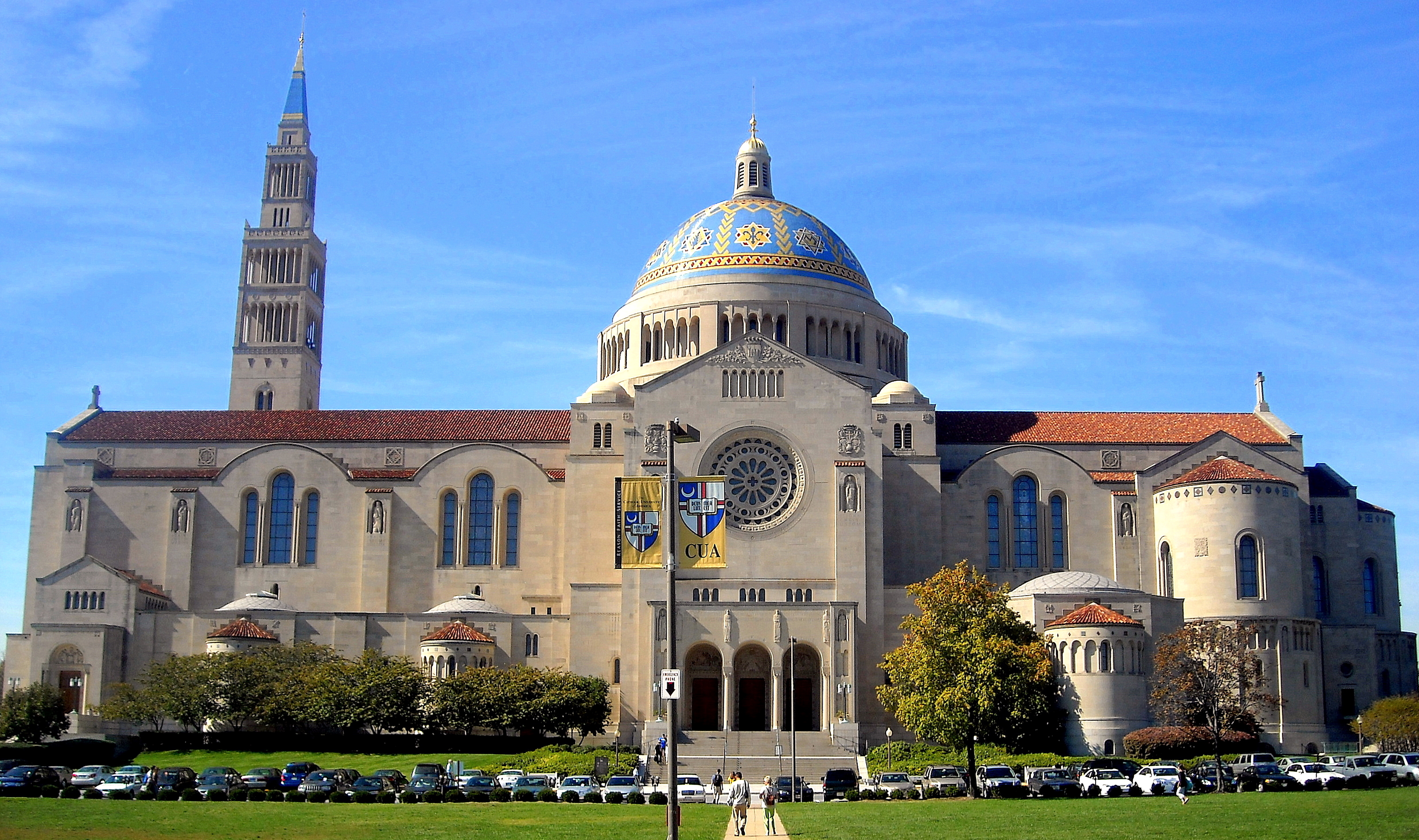
The Basilica of the National Shrine of the Immaculate Conception, in Washington, D.C., is the largest Catholic church in the United States. A special hall in the crypt level of the Basilica contains statues of American saints.

The Catholic Church recognizes various deceased Catholics as saints, beati, and venerabili and Servants of God. Some of these figures are significantly associated with what was at the time or subsequently became the United States.

Catholicism in the United States began with the first European explorations and colonization of the Americas. Indeed, Columbus's expedition of 1492 included Catholic priests among the crew. Catholic missionaries were some of the first Europeans to reach many parts of French North America and British North America in the east, and Spanish North America in the Southwestern United States.

Several American Catholics have been considered for sainthood over the past 50 years. Catholics continue to contribute to American religious life. Most of these Americans were born after 1850, though the majority of those who have been canonized so far were not.

== American saints ==
=== Individual causes ===
Image	Name	Born	Died	Church Status	Diocese	Type of Cause
	Frances Xavier Cabrini	15 July 1850 in Sant'Angelo Lodigiano, Lodi, Italy	22 December 1917 in Chicago, Illinois, United States	Founder, Missionary Sisters of the Sacred Heart of Jesus	Chicago	Heroic Virtues
	Frances Xavier Cabrini	15 July 1850 in Sant'Angelo Lodigiano, Lodi, Italy	22 December 1917 in Chicago, Illinois, United States	Introduction of Cause: 20 March 1931; Declared "Venerable": 21 November 1937; Beatified: 13 November 1938 by Pope Pius XI; Canonized: 7 July 1946 by Pope Pius XII		
	Elizabeth Ann Bayley Seton	28 August 1774 in New York City, New York, United States	4 January 1821 in Emmitsburg, Maryland, United States	Widow; Founder, Daughters of Charity of Saint Vincent de Paul (in the United States), the Sisters of Charity of Cincinnati, the Sisters of Charity of Seton Hill, the Sisters of Charity of Saint Vincent de Paul of Halifax, the Sisters of Charity of Saint Vincent de Paul of New York and the Sisters of Charity of Saint Elizabeth of New Jersey	Baltimore	Heroic Virtues
	Elizabeth Ann Bayley Seton	28 August 1774 in New York City, New York, United States	4 January 1821 in Emmitsburg, Maryland, United States	Introduction of Cause: 1907; Declared "Venerable": 18 December 1959; Beatified: 17 March 1963 by Pope John XXIII; Canonized: 14 September 1975 by Pope Paul VI		
	John Nepomucene Neumann	28 March 1811 in Prachatice, Czechia	5 January 1860 in Philadelphia, Pennsylvania, United States	Professed Priest, Redemptorists; Bishop of Philadelphia; Founder, Sisters of Saint Francis of Philadelphia	Philadelphia and České Budějovice	Heroic Virtues
	John Nepomucene Neumann	28 March 1811 in Prachatice, Czechia	5 January 1860 in Philadelphia, Pennsylvania, United States	Introduction of Cause: 5 May 1886; Declared "Venerable": 11 December 1921; Beatified: 13 October 1963 by Pope Paul VI; Canonized: 19 June 1977 by Pope Paul VI		
	Rose-Philippine Duchesne	29 August 1769 in Grenoble, Isère, France	18 November 1852 in St. Charles, Missouri, United States	Professed Religious, Society of the Religious of the Sacred Heart of Jesus	Rome and Saint Louis	Heroic Virtues
	Rose-Philippine Duchesne	29 August 1769 in Grenoble, Isère, France	18 November 1852 in St. Charles, Missouri, United States	Introduction of Cause: 9 December 1909; Declared "Venerable": 17 March 1935; Beatified: 12 May 1940 by Pope Pius XII; Canonized: 3 July 1988 by Pope John Paul II		
	Katharine Mary Drexel	26 November 1858 in Philadelphia, Pennsylvania, United States	3 March 1955 in Cornwells Heights, Pennsylvania, United States	Founder, Sisters of the Blessed Sacrament for Indians and Colored People	Philadelphia	Heroic Virtues
	Katharine Mary Drexel	26 November 1858 in Philadelphia, Pennsylvania, United States	3 March 1955 in Cornwells Heights, Pennsylvania, United States	Introduction of Cause: 9 November 1973; Declared "Venerable": 26 January 1987; Beatified: 20 November 1988 by Pope John Paul II; Canonized: 1 October 2000 by Pope John Paul II		
	Anne-Thérèse Guérin (rel. name: Mother Théodore)	2 October 1798 in Étables-sur-Mer, Côtes-d'Armor, France	14 Mat 1856 in Saint Mary-of-the-Woods, Indiana, United States	Founder, Sisters of Providence of Saint Mary-of-the-Woods	Indianapolis	Heroic Virtues
	Anne-Thérèse Guérin (rel. name: Mother Théodore)	2 October 1798 in Étables-sur-Mer, Côtes-d'Armor, France	14 Mat 1856 in Saint Mary-of-the-Woods, Indiana, United States	Introduction of Cause: 8 September 1909; Declared "Venerable": 11 July 1992; Beatified: 25 October 1998 by Pope John Paul II; Canonized: 15 October 2006 by Pope Benedict XVI		
	Jozef De Veuster (rel. name: Damien)	3 January 1840 in Tremelo, Vlaams-Brabant, Belgium	15 April 1889 in Kalaupapa, Molokaʻi, Hawaiʻi, United States	Professed Priest, Congregation of the Sacred Hearts of Jesus and Mary (Picpus)	Mechelen–Brussels and Honolulu	Heroic Virtues
	Jozef De Veuster (rel. name: Damien)	3 January 1840 in Tremelo, Vlaams-Brabant, Belgium	15 April 1889 in Kalaupapa, Molokaʻi, Hawaiʻi, United States	Introduction of Cause: 1938; Declared "Venerable": 7 July 1977; Beatified: 14 June 1995 by Pope John Paul II; Canonized: 11 October 2009 by Pope Benedict XVI		
	Barbara Cope (rel. name: Marianne)	23 January 1838 in Heppenheim, Hesse, Germany	9 August 1918 in Kalaupapa, Molokaʻi, Hawaiʻi, United States	Professed Religious, Franciscan Sisters of Syracuse	Honolulu	Heroic Virtues
	Barbara Cope (rel. name: Marianne)	23 January 1838 in Heppenheim, Hesse, Germany	9 August 1918 in Kalaupapa, Molokaʻi, Hawaiʻi, United States	Introduction of Cause: 28 July 1983; Declared "Venerable": 19 April 2004; Beatified: 14 May 2005 by Cardinal José Saraiva Martins, C.M.F.; Canonized: 21 October 2012 by Pope Benedict XVI		
	Kateri Tekakwitha	c. 1656 in Ossernenon near Auriesville, New York, United States	17 April 1680 in Kahnawake, Québec, Canada	Young Layperson of the Archdiocese of Montréal	Montréal	Heroic Virtues
	Kateri Tekakwitha	c. 1656 in Ossernenon near Auriesville, New York, United States	17 April 1680 in Kahnawake, Québec, Canada	Introduction of Cause: 1931; Declared "Venerable": 3 January 1943; Beatified: 22 June 1980 by Pope John Paul II; Canonized: 21 October 2012 by Benedict XVI		
	Pedro Calungsod	July 21, 1654 in one of the Visayan islands, Captaincy General of the Philippines	April 2, 1672 in Tumon, Guam, Captaincy General of the Philippines	Young Layperson of the Archdiocese of Cebu	Cebu and Agaña	Martyr in odium fidei, uti fertur
	Pedro Calungsod	July 21, 1654 in one of the Visayan islands, Captaincy General of the Philippines	April 2, 1672 in Tumon, Guam, Captaincy General of the Philippines	Introduction of Cause: February 4, 1994; Declared "Venerable": January 27, 2000; Beatified: March 5, 2000 by Pope John Paul II; Canonized: October 21, 2012 by Pope Benedict XVI		
	Miguel José Serra Ferrer (rel. name: Fra Junípero)	24 November 1713 in Petra, Mallorca, Spain	28 August 1784 in Monterey, California, United States	Professed Priest, Franciscan Friars Minor	Monterey	Heroic Virtues
	Miguel José Serra Ferrer (rel. name: Fra Junípero)	24 November 1713 in Petra, Mallorca, Spain	28 August 1784 in Monterey, California, United States	Introduction of Cause: 30 August 1943; Declared "Venerable": 9 May 1985; Beatified: 25 September 1988 by Pope John Paul II; Canonized: 23 September 2015 by Pope Francis		

=== Group martyrs ===
Image	Saints and Servants of God	Born	Died	Church Status	Diocese	Type of Cause
Jesuit Martyrs of North America (1642–49)
	René Goupil	15 May 1608 in Saint-Martin-du-Bois, Maine-et-Loire, France	29 September 1642 in Ossernenon, near Auriesville, New York, United States	Professed Religious, Jesuits	Toronto and New York	Martyr in odium fidei, uti fertur
	Isaac Jogues	10 January 1607 in Orléans, Loiret, France	18 October 1646 in Ossernenon, near Auriesville, New York, United States	Professed Priest, Jesuits	Toronto and New York	Martyr in odium fidei, uti fertur
	Jean de Lalande	c. 1620–25 in Dieppe, Seine-Maritime, France	19 October 1646 in Ossernenon, near Auriesville, New York, United States	Professed Religious, Jesuits	Toronto and New York	Martyr in odium fidei, uti fertur
		Introduction of Cause: Declared "Venerable": Beatified: 21 June 1925 by Pope Pius XI; Canonized: 29 June 1930 by Pope Pius XI				

== American beati ==
=== Individual causes ===
Image	Name	Born	Died	Church Status	Diocese	Type of Cause
	Maria Franziska Schervier	2 January 1819 in Aachen, North Rhine-Westphalia, Germany	14 December 1876 in Aachen, North Rhine-Westphalia, Germany	Founder, Poor Sisters of Saint Francis and Franciscan Sisters of the Poor	Aachen	Heroic Virtues
	Maria Franziska Schervier	2 January 1819 in Aachen, North Rhine-Westphalia, Germany	14 December 1876 in Aachen, North Rhine-Westphalia, Germany	Introduction of Cause: 24 September 1912; Declared "Venerable": 30 January 1969; Beatified: 28 April 1974 by Pope Paul VI		
	Diego Luis de San Vitores	13 November 1627 in Burgos, Spain	2 April 1672 in Tumon, Guam	Professed Priest, Jesuits	Manila and Agaña	Martyr in odium fidei, uti fertur
	Diego Luis de San Vitores	13 November 1627 in Burgos, Spain	2 April 1672 in Tumon, Guam	Introduction of Cause: 1688; Declared "Venerable": 9 November 1984; Beatified: 6 October 1985 by Pope John Paul II		
	Franz Xavier Seelos	11 January 1819 in Füssen, Bavaria, Germany	4 October 1867 in New Orleans, Louisiana, United States	Professed Priest, Redemptorists	New Orleans and Baltimore	Heroic Virtues
	Franz Xavier Seelos	11 January 1819 in Füssen, Bavaria, Germany	4 October 1867 in New Orleans, Louisiana, United States	Introduction of Cause: 17 September 1900; Declared "Venerable": 27 January 2000; Beatified: 9 April 2000 by Pope John Paul II		
	Carlos Manuel Cecilio Rodríguez Santiago	22 November 1918 in Caguas, Puerto Rico	13 July 1963 in Caguas, Puerto Rico	Layperson of the Diocese of Caguas	Caguas	Heroic Virtues
	Carlos Manuel Cecilio Rodríguez Santiago	22 November 1918 in Caguas, Puerto Rico	13 July 1963 in Caguas, Puerto Rico	Introduction of Cause: 26 June 1992; Declared "Venerable": 7 July 1997; Beatified: 29 April 2001 by Pope John Paul II		
	Teresa Demjanovich (rel. name: Miriam Teresa)	26 March 1901 in Bayonne, New Jersey, United States	8 May 1927 in Convent Station, New Jersey, United States	Professed Religious, Sisters of Charity of Saint Elizabeth	Paterson	Heroic Virtues
	Teresa Demjanovich (rel. name: Miriam Teresa)	26 March 1901 in Bayonne, New Jersey, United States	8 May 1927 in Convent Station, New Jersey, United States	Introduction of Cause: 23 March 1972; Declared "Venerable": 10 May 2012; Beatified: 4 October 2014 by Cardinal Angelo Amato, S.D.B.		
	Stanley Francis Rother	27 March 1935 in Okarche, Oklahoma, United States	28 July 1981 in Santiago Atitlán, Sololá, Guatemala	Priest of the Archdiocese of Oklahoma City	Oklahoma City	Martyr in odium fidei, uti fertur
	Stanley Francis Rother	27 March 1935 in Okarche, Oklahoma, United States	28 July 1981 in Santiago Atitlán, Sololá, Guatemala	Introduction of Cause: 3 September 2007; Declared "Venerable": 1 December 2016; Beatified: 23 September 2017 by Cardinal Angelo Amato, S.D.B.		
	Bernard Casey (rel. name: Francis Solanus)	25 November 1870 in Oak Grove, Wisconsin, United States	31 July 1957 in Detroit, Michigan, United States	Professed Priest, Capuchin Franciscans	Detroit	Heroic Virtues
	Bernard Casey (rel. name: Francis Solanus)	25 November 1870 in Oak Grove, Wisconsin, United States	31 July 1957 in Detroit, Michigan, United States	Introduction of Cause: 26 October 1983; Declared "Venerable": 11 July 1995; Beatified: 18 November 2017 by Cardinal Angelo Amato, S.D.B.		
	James Alfred Miller (rel. name: Leo William [Santiago])	21 September 1944 in Stevens Point, Wisconsin, United States	13 February 1982 in Huehuetenango, Guatemala	Professed Religious, Brothers of the Christian Schools (De La Salle Brothers)	Huehuetenango	Martyr in odium fidei, uti fertur
	James Alfred Miller (rel. name: Leo William [Santiago])	21 September 1944 in Stevens Point, Wisconsin, United States	13 February 1982 in Huehuetenango, Guatemala	Introduction of Cause: 1 September 2009; Declared "Venerable": 7 November 2018; Beatified: 7 December 2019 by Cardinal José Luis Lacunza Maestrojuán		
	Michael Joseph McGivney	12 August 1852 in Waterbury, Connecticut, United States	14 August 1890 in Thomaston, Connecticut, United States	Priest of the Archdiocese of Hartford; Founder, Knights of Columbus	Hartford	Heroic Virtues
	Michael Joseph McGivney	12 August 1852 in Waterbury, Connecticut, United States	14 August 1890 in Thomaston, Connecticut, United States	Introduction of Cause: 15 September 1997; Declared "Venerable": 15 March 2008; Beatified: 31 October 2020 by Cardinal Joseph William Tobin		
	Fulton John Sheen	8 May 1895 in El Paso, Illinois, United States	9 December 1979 in New York City, New York, United States	Bishop of Rochester; Titular Archbishop of Newport	Peoria	Heroic Virtues
	Fulton John Sheen	8 May 1895 in El Paso, Illinois, United States	9 December 1979 in New York City, New York, United States	Introduction of Cause: 14 September 2002; Declared "Venerable": 28 June 2012; Beatified: 24 September 2026 by Cardinal Luis Antonio Tagle		

=== Group martyrs ===
Image	Saints and Servants of God	Born	Died	Church Status	Diocese	Type of Cause
Martyrs of the Spanish Civil War (1934–39)
	Josep Tristany Pujol (rel. name: Lluc of Saint Joseph)	14 December 1872 in Su, Lleida, Spain	20 July 1936 in Barcelona, Spain	Professed Priest, Discalced Carmelites	Barcelona	Martyr in odium fidei, uti fertur
	Ricardo Farré Masip (rel. name: Eduardo of the Child Jesus)	3 April 1897 in Lleida, Spain	25 July 1936 in Montcada, Barcelona, Spain	Professed Priest, Discalced Carmelites	Barcelona	Martyr in odium fidei, uti fertur
		Introduction of Cause: 1952; Declared "Venerable": 22 June 2004; Beatified: 28 October 2007 by Cardinal José Saraiva Martins, C.M.F.				
Franciscan Martyrs of Georgia (1597)
	Pedro de Corpa	c. 1555 in Villaba, Burgos, Spain	13 September 1597 in Darien, Georgia, United States	Professed Priests, Franciscan Friars Minor	Savannah	Martyrs in odium fidei, uti fertur
	Blas de Rodríguez	c. 1500 in Villa de Cuacos, Cáceres, Spain	16 September 1597 in Eulonia, Georgia, United States	Professed Priests, Franciscan Friars Minor	Savannah	Martyrs in odium fidei, uti fertur
	Miguel de Añon	c. 1550–60 in Zaragoza, Spain	17 September 1597 in St. Catherines Island, Georgia, United States	Professed Priests, Franciscan Friars Minor	Savannah	Martyrs in odium fidei, uti fertur
	Antonio de Badajoz	c. 1550 in La Albuera, Badajoz, United States	17 September 1597 in St. Catherines Island, Georgia, United States	Professed Religious, Franciscan Friars Minor	Savannah	Martyrs in odium fidei, uti fertur
	Francisco de Veráscola	c. 1560–70 in Gordejuela, Vizcaya, United States	18 September 1597 in St. Simons, Georgia, United States	Professed Priest, Franciscan Friars Minor	Savannah	Martyrs in odium fidei, uti fertur
		Introduction of Cause: 6 March 1986; Declared "Venerable": 27 January 2025; Beatified: 31 October 2026 by Cardinal Frank Leo				

== American Venerables ==
=== Individual causes ===
Image	Name	Born	Died	Church Status	Diocese	Type of Cause
	Antonio Margil Ros (rel. name: Antonio of Jesus)	18 August 1657 in Valencia, Spain	6 August 1726 in Mexico City, Mexico	Professed Priest, Franciscan Friars Minor	Mexico	Heroic Virtues
	Antonio Margil Ros (rel. name: Antonio of Jesus)	18 August 1657 in Valencia, Spain	6 August 1726 in Mexico City, Mexico	Introduction of Cause: 29 December 1770; Declared "Venerable": 31 July 1836		
	Cornelia Peacock Connelly	15 January 1809 in Philadelphia, Pennsylvania, United States	18 April 1879 in Saint Leonards-on-Sea, East Sussex, England	Founder, Society of the Holy Child Jesus	Southwark	Heroic Virtues
	Cornelia Peacock Connelly	15 January 1809 in Philadelphia, Pennsylvania, United States	18 April 1879 in Saint Leonards-on-Sea, East Sussex, England	Introduction of Cause: 12 November 1959; Declared "Venerable": 13 June 1992		
	Samuel Charles Mazzuchelli	4 November 1806 in Milan, Italy	23 February 1864 in Benton, Wisconsin, United States	Professed Priest, Dominicans; Founder, Dominican Sisters of the Most Holy Rosary of Sinsinawa	Madison	Heroic Virtues
	Samuel Charles Mazzuchelli	4 November 1806 in Milan, Italy	23 February 1864 in Benton, Wisconsin, United States	Introduction of Cause: 1966; Declared "Venerable": 6 July 1993		
	Józefina Dudzik (rel. name: Mary Theresa)	30 August 1860 in Płocicz, Kamień Krajeński, Sępólno, Poland	20 September 1918 in Chicago, Illinois, United States	Founder, Franciscan Sisters of Chicago	Chicago	Heroic Virtues
	Józefina Dudzik (rel. name: Mary Theresa)	30 August 1860 in Płocicz, Kamień Krajeński, Sępólno, Poland	20 September 1918 in Chicago, Illinois, United States	Introduction of Cause: 1 June 1979; Declared "Venerable": 26 March 1994		
	Pierre Toussaint	prob. 27 June 1766 (or 1780) in Saint-Marc, Artibonite, Haiti	30 June 1853 in New York City, New York, United States	Married Layperson of the Archdiocese of New York	New York	Heroic Virtues
	Pierre Toussaint	prob. 27 June 1766 (or 1780) in Saint-Marc, Artibonite, Haiti	30 June 1853 in New York City, New York, United States	Introduction of Cause: 12 November 1988; Declared "Venerable": 17 December 1996		
	Henriette DeLille	11 March 1813 in New Orleans, Louisiana, United States	17 November 1862 in New Orleans, Louisiana, United States	Founder, Sisters of the Holy Family of New Orleans	New Orleans	Heroic Virtues
	Henriette DeLille	11 March 1813 in New Orleans, Louisiana, United States	17 November 1862 in New Orleans, Louisiana, United States	Introduction of Cause: 22 June 1988; Declared "Venerable": 27 March 2010		
	Kasimira Kaupas (rel. name: Maria)	6 January 1880 in Ramygala, Panevėžys, Lithuania	17 April 1940 in Chicago, Illinois, United States	Founder, Sisters of Saint Casimir	Chicago	Heroic Virtues
	Kasimira Kaupas (rel. name: Maria)	6 January 1880 in Ramygala, Panevėžys, Lithuania	17 April 1940 in Chicago, Illinois, United States	Introduction of Cause: 6 September 1988; Declared "Venerable": 1 July 2010		
	Nelson Baker	16 February 1842 in Buffalo, New York, United States	29 July 1936 in Lackawanna, New York, United States	Priest of the Diocese of Buffalo	Buffalo	Heroic Virtues
	Nelson Baker	16 February 1842 in Buffalo, New York, United States	29 July 1936 in Lackawanna, New York, United States	Introduction of Cause: 6 July 1987; Declared "Venerable": 14 January 2011		
	Félix Varela Morales	20 November 1788 in Havana, Cuba	25 February 1853 in St. Augustine, Florida, United States	Priest of the Archdiocese of San Cristóbal de La Habana	San Cristóbal de La Habana	Heroic Virtues
	Félix Varela Morales	20 November 1788 in Havana, Cuba	25 February 1853 in St. Augustine, Florida, United States	Introduction of Cause: 12 January 1996; Declared "Venerable": 14 March 2012		
	Friderik Irene Baraga	28 June 1797 in Knežja Vas, Trebnje, Slovenia	19 January 1868 in Marquette, Michigan, United States	Bishop of Marquette	Marquette	Heroic Virtues
	Friderik Irene Baraga	28 June 1797 in Knežja Vas, Trebnje, Slovenia	19 January 1868 in Marquette, Michigan, United States	Introduction of Cause: 17 August 1972; Declared "Venerable": 10 May 2012		
	Bridget Teresa McCrory (rel. name: Mary Angeline Teresa)	21 January 1893 in Mountjoy, County Tyrone, Northern Ireland	21 January 1984 in Germantown, New York, United States	Founder, Carmelite Sisters for the Aged and Infirm	Albany	Heroic Virtues
	Bridget Teresa McCrory (rel. name: Mary Angeline Teresa)	21 January 1893 in Mountjoy, County Tyrone, Northern Ireland	21 January 1984 in Germantown, New York, United States	Introduction of Cause: 1 June 1989; Declared "Venerable": 28 June 2012		
	Celestina Bottego	20 December 1895 in Glendale, Ohio, United States	20 August 1980 in Parma, Italy	Founder, Xaverian Missionary Sisters, Society of Mary	Parma	Heroic Virtues
	Celestina Bottego	20 December 1895 in Glendale, Ohio, United States	20 August 1980 in Parma, Italy	Introduction of Cause: 24 November 1994; Declared "Venerable": 31 October 2013		
	Rafael Cordero Molina	24 October 1790 in San Juan, Puerto Rico	5 July 1868 in San Juan, Puerto Rico	Layperson of the Archdiocese of San Juan de Puerto Rico	San Juan de Puerto Rico	Heroic Virtues
	Rafael Cordero Molina	24 October 1790 in San Juan, Puerto Rico	5 July 1868 in San Juan, Puerto Rico	Introduction of Cause: 16 April 2003; Declared "Venerable": 9 December 2013		
	Aloysius Schwartz	18 September 1930 in Washington, D.C., United States	16 March 1992 in Manila, Philippines	Priest of the Archdiocese of Manila; Founder, Sisters of Mary of Banneux and Brothers of Christ	Manila	Heroic Virtues
	Aloysius Schwartz	18 September 1930 in Washington, D.C., United States	16 March 1992 in Manila, Philippines	Introduction of Cause: 27 November 2003; Declared "Venerable": 22 January 2015		
	William Gagnon	16 May 1905 in Dover, New Hampshire, United States	28 February 1972 in Ho Chi Minh City, Vietnam	Professed Religious, Hospitaller Brothers of Saint John of God	Montréal	Heroic Virtues
	William Gagnon	16 May 1905 in Dover, New Hampshire, United States	28 February 1972 in Ho Chi Minh City, Vietnam	Introduction of Cause: 24 March 1999; Declared "Venerable": 14 December 2015		
	Alphonse Gallegos	20 February 1931 in Albuquerque, New Mexico, United States	6 October 1991 in Yuba City, California, United States	Professed Priest, Augustinian Recollects; Titular Bishop of Sasabe; Auxiliary Bishop of Sacramento	Sacramento	Heroic Virtues
	Alphonse Gallegos	20 February 1931 in Albuquerque, New Mexico, United States	6 October 1991 in Yuba City, California, United States	Introduction of Cause: 4 December 2005; Declared "Venerable": 8 July 2016		
	Teresa Fardella di Blasi	24 May 1867 in New York City, New York, United States	26 August 1957 in Trapani, Italy	Widow; Founder, Poor Daughters of the Crowned Virgin	Trapani	Heroic Virtues
	Teresa Fardella di Blasi	24 May 1867 in New York City, New York, United States	26 August 1957 in Trapani, Italy	Introduction of Cause: 16 March 1960; Declared "Venerable": 8 November 2017		
	Patrick Peyton	9 January 1909 in Carracastle, County Mayo, Ireland	3 June 1992 in San Pedro, Los Angeles, United States	Professed Priest, Congregation of Holy Cross; Founder, Family Rosary Crusade	Baltimore	Heroic Virtues
	Patrick Peyton	9 January 1909 in Carracastle, County Mayo, Ireland	3 June 1992 in San Pedro, Los Angeles, United States	Introduction of Cause: 19 December 2000; Declared "Venerable": 18 December 2017		
	Norbert McAuliffe	30 September 1886 in Manhattan, New York, United States	3 July 1959 in Alokolum, Gulu, Uganda	Professed Religious, Brothers of the Sacred Heart	Gulu	Heroic Virtues
	Norbert McAuliffe	30 September 1886 in Manhattan, New York, United States	3 July 1959 in Alokolum, Gulu, Uganda	Introduction of Cause: 16 June 1994; Declared "Venerable": 19 May 2018		
	Antonietta Giugliano	11 July 1909 in New York City, New York, United States	8 June 1960 in Portici, Naples, Italy	Cofounder, Little Servants of Christ the King	Naples	Heroic Virtues
	Antonietta Giugliano	11 July 1909 in New York City, New York, United States	8 June 1960 in Portici, Naples, Italy	Introduction of Cause: 3 July 2006; Declared "Venerable": 21 December 2018		
	María Consuelo Sanjurjo Santos (rel. name: María Soledad)	15 November 1892 in Arecibo, Puerto Rico	23 April 1973 in San Juan, Puerto Rico	Professed Religious, Servants of Mary, Ministers of the Sick	San Juan de Puerto Rico	Heroic Virtues
	María Consuelo Sanjurjo Santos (rel. name: María Soledad)	15 November 1892 in Arecibo, Puerto Rico	23 April 1973 in San Juan, Puerto Rico	Introduction of Cause: 13 September 2003; Declared "Venerable": 15 January 2019		
	Augustin Arnaud Pagès (rel. name: Nymphas Victorin)	7 September 1885 in Chadron, Haute-Loire, France	16 April 1966 in San Juan, Puerto Rico	Professed Religious, Brothers of the Christian Schools (De La Salle Brothers)	San Juan de Puerto Rico	Heroic Virtues
	Augustin Arnaud Pagès (rel. name: Nymphas Victorin)	7 September 1885 in Chadron, Haute-Loire, France	16 April 1966 in San Juan, Puerto Rico	Introduction of Cause: 30 March 1999; Declared "Venerable": 6 April 2019		
	Augustus Tolton	1 April 1854 in Brush Creek, Missouri, United States	9 July 1897 in Chicago, Illinois, United States	Priest of the Archdiocese of Chicago	Chicago	Heroic Virtues
	Augustus Tolton	1 April 1854 in Brush Creek, Missouri, United States	9 July 1897 in Chicago, Illinois, United States	Introduction of Cause: 2 March 2010; Declared "Venerable": 11 June 2019		
	Mario Hiriart Pulido	23 July 1931 in Santiago, Chile	15 July 1964 in Milwaukee, Wisconsin, United States	Layperson of the Archdiocese of Santiago de Chile; Member, Secular Institute of the Schöenstatt Brothers of Mary	Santiago de Chile	Heroic Virtues
	Mario Hiriart Pulido	23 July 1931 in Santiago, Chile	15 July 1964 in Milwaukee, Wisconsin, United States	Introduction of Cause: 31 May 1997; Declared "Venerable": 21 February 2020		
	Eusebio Francesco Chini	10 August 1645 in Segno, Trentino, Italy	15 May 1711 in Santa María Magdalena, Sonora, Mexico	Professed Priest, Jesuits	Hermosillo	Heroic Virtues
	Eusebio Francesco Chini	10 August 1645 in Segno, Trentino, Italy	15 May 1711 in Santa María Magdalena, Sonora, Mexico	Introduction of Cause: 1971; Declared "Venerable": 10 July 2020		
	Mary Elizabeth Lange	c. 1794 in Santiago de Cuba, Cuba	3 February 1882 in Baltimore, Maryland, United States	Founder, Oblate Sisters of Providence	Baltimore	Heroic Virtues
	Mary Elizabeth Lange	c. 1794 in Santiago de Cuba, Cuba	3 February 1882 in Baltimore, Maryland, United States	Introduction of Cause: 9 January 1991; Declared "Venerable": 22 June 2023		
	Rose Hawthorne (rel. name: Mary Alphonsa)	20 May 1851 in Lenox, Massachusetts, United States	9 July 1926 in Hawthorne, New York, United States	Founder, Dominican Sisters of Saint Rose of Lima (Dominican Sisters of Hawthorne)	New York	Heroic Virtues
	Rose Hawthorne (rel. name: Mary Alphonsa)	20 May 1851 in Lenox, Massachusetts, United States	9 July 1926 in Hawthorne, New York, United States	Introduction of Cause: 4 February 2003; Declared "Venerable": 14 March 2024		
	Emil Joseph Kapaun	20 April 1916 in Pilsen, Kansas, United States	23 May 1951 in Pyŏktong, North Pyongan, North Korea	Priest of the Diocese of Wichita	Wichita	Offering of Life
	Emil Joseph Kapaun	20 April 1916 in Pilsen, Kansas, United States	23 May 1951 in Pyŏktong, North Pyongan, North Korea	Introduction of Cause: 4 February 2003; Declared "Venerable": 25 February 2025		
	Edward Joseph Flanagan	13 July 1886 in Leabeg, County Roscommon, Ireland	15 May 1948 in Berlin, Germany	Priest of the Archdiocese of Omaha	Omaha	Heroic Virtues
	Edward Joseph Flanagan	13 July 1886 in Leabeg, County Roscommon, Ireland	15 May 1948 in Berlin, Germany	Introduction of Cause: 17 March 2012; Declared "Venerable": 23 March 2026		
	Theresia Ijsseldijk (rel. name: Theresia of the Holy Trinity)	13 November 1897 in Apeldoorn, Gelderland, Netherlands	10 March 1926 in Saint Louis, Missouri, United States	Professed Religious, Carmelite Daughters of the Divine Heart of Jesus	Roermond	Heroic Virtues
	Theresia Ijsseldijk (rel. name: Theresia of the Holy Trinity)	13 November 1897 in Apeldoorn, Gelderland, Netherlands	10 March 1926 in Saint Louis, Missouri, United States	Introduction of Cause: 15 April 2010; Declared "Venerable": 27 April 2026		
	Julia Teresa Tallon (rel. name: Mary Teresa)	6 May 1867 in Hanover, Oneida, New York, United States	10 March 1954 in Monroe, New York, United States	Founder, Parish Visitors of Mary Immaculate	New York	Heroic Virtues
	Julia Teresa Tallon (rel. name: Mary Teresa)	6 May 1867 in Hanover, Oneida, New York, United States	10 March 1954 in Monroe, New York, United States	Introduction of Cause: 28 February 2013; Declared "Venerable": 18 June 2026		

== Servants of God ==
The following list is based on the Dicastery for the Causes of Saints:

=== Individual causes ===
Year	Image	Name	Born	Died	Church Status	Diocese	Type of Cause
1820		Felix [Felice] de Andreis	12 December 1778 in Demonte, Cuneo, Italy	15 October 1820 in St. Louis, Missouri, United States	Priest, Congregation of the Mission (Vincentians)	Saint Louis and Turin	Heroic Virtues
1820		Felix [Felice] de Andreis	Introduction of Cause: 25 June 1918				
1830		Magí Catalá Guasch	30 January 1761 in Montblanc, Tarragona, Spain	22 November 1830 in Santa Clara, California, United States	Professed Priest, Franciscan Friars Minor	San Francisco	Heroic Virtues
1830		Magí Catalá Guasch	Introduction of Cause: August 1884				
1839		Simon-Guillaume-Gabriel Bruté de Rémur	20 March 1779 in Rennes, Ille-et-Vilaine, France	26 June 1839 in Vincennes, Indiana, United States	Bishop of Vincennes (now Indianapolis)	Indianapolis	Heroic Virtues
1839		Simon-Guillaume-Gabriel Bruté de Rémur	Introduction of Cause: 2 December 2005				
1840		Demetrius Augustine Gallitzin	22 December 1770 in The Hague, Netherlands	6 May 1840 in Loretto, Pennsylvania, United States	Priest of the Diocese of Altoona–Johnstown	Altoona–Johnstown	Heroic Virtues
1840		Demetrius Augustine Gallitzin	Introduction of Cause: 16 May 2005				
1843		Giuseppe Rosati	12 January 1789 in Sora, Lazio, Frosinone, Italy	25 September 1843 in Rome, Italy	Priest, Congregation of the Mission (Vincentians); Bishop of Saint Louis	Saint Louis	Heroic Virtues
1843		Giuseppe Rosati	Introduction of Cause:				
1878		Patrick Ryan	c. 1845 near Nenagh, County Tipperary, Ireland	28 September 1878 in Chattanooga, Tennessee, United States	Priest of the Diocese of Knoxville	Knoxville	Heroic Virtues
1878		Patrick Ryan	Introduction of Cause: 14 November 2016				
1888		Isaac Thomas Hecker	18 December 1819 in Manhattan, New York, United States	22 December 1888 in Manhattan, New York, United States	Priest and Founder, Missionary Society of Saint Paul the Apostle (Paulist Fathers)	New York	Heroic Virtues
1888		Isaac Thomas Hecker	Introduction of Cause: 27 January 2008				
1893		Joan Adelaide O'Sullivan (rel. name: María Adelaida of Saint Teresa)	8 October 1817 in New York City, New York, United States	15 April 1893 in Grajal de Campos, León, Spain	Professed Religious, Discalced Carmelite Nuns	León (Spain)	Heroic Virtues
1893		Joan Adelaide O'Sullivan (rel. name: María Adelaida of Saint Teresa)	Introduction of Cause: 23 November 1984				
1896		Marie Adele Joseph Brise	30 January 1831 in Dion-le-Val, Chaumont-Gistoux, Belgium	5 July 1896 in Champion, Wisconsin, United States	Layperson of the Diocese of Green Bay	Green Bay	Heroic Virtues
1896		Marie Adele Joseph Brise	Introduction of Cause: 30 January 2026				
1899		Louis de Goesbriand	4 August 1816 in Saint-Urbain, Finistère, France	3 November 1899 in Burlington, Vermont, United States	Bishop of Burlington	Burlington	Heroic Virtues
1899		Louis de Goesbriand	Introduction of Cause:				
1905		Anna Bentivoglio (rel. name: Maria Maddalena of the Sacred Heart of Jesus)	29 July 1824 in Fiano Romano, Rome, Italy	18 August 1905 in Evansville, Indiana, United States	Professed Religious, Poor Clare Nuns	Evansville	Heroic Virtues
1905		Anna Bentivoglio (rel. name: Maria Maddalena of the Sacred Heart of Jesus)	Introduction of Cause: 30 November 1940				
1907		Margaret Mary Healy Murphy	4 May 1833 in Cahersiveen, County Kerry, Ireland	25 August 1907 in San Antonio, Texas, United States	Widow; Founder, Sisters of the Holy Spirit and Mary Immaculate	San Antonio	Heroic Virtues
1907		Margaret Mary Healy Murphy	Introduction of Cause:				
1908		Joseph Heinrichs (rel. name: Leo)	15 August 1867 in Oestrich, Erkelenz, North Rhine-Westphalia, Germany	23 February 1908 in Denver, Colorado, United States	Professed Priest, Franciscan Friars Minor	Newark and Denver	Martyr in odium fidei, uti fertur
1908		Joseph Heinrichs (rel. name: Leo)	Introduction of Cause: 1 March 1927				
1918		Julia Greeley	c. 1833–48 in Hannibal, Missouri, United States	7 June 1918 in Denver, Colorado, United States	Layperson of the Archdiocese of Denver; Member, Secular Franciscans	Denver	Heroic Virtues
1918		Julia Greeley	Introduction of Cause: 22 October 2016				
1919		Thomas Frederick Price	19 April 1860 in Wilmington, North Carolina, United States	12 September 1919 in Hong Kong, China	Priest of the Diocese of Raleigh; Cofounder, Maryknoll Missionary Society	Raleigh	Heroic Virtues
1919		Thomas Frederick Price	Introduction of Cause: 2 October 1992				
1920		Francis Joseph Parater	10 October 1897 in Richmond, Virginia, United States	7 February 1920 in Rome, Italy	Seminarian of the Diocese of Richmond	Richmond	Heroic Virtues
1920		Francis Joseph Parater	Introduction of Cause: 4 May 2001				
1923		Jožef Frančišek Buh	17 March 1833 in Zadobje, Gorenja Vas–Poljane, Slovenia	3 February 1923 in Duluth, Minnesota, United States	Priest of the Diocese of Duluth	Duluth	Heroic Virtues
1923		Jožef Frančišek Buh	Introduction of Cause:				
1923		John Eckert (rel. name: Stephen of Dublin)	28 April 1869 in Dublin, Ontario, Canada	16 February 1923 in Milwaukee, Wisconsin, United States	Professed Priest, Capuchin Franciscans	Milwaukee	Heroic Virtues
1923		John Eckert (rel. name: Stephen of Dublin)	Introduction of Cause: 26 April 1985				
1923		John O'Neill (rel. name: Columba)	5 November 1848 in McKeansburg, Pennsylvania, United States	20 November 1923 in Notre Dame, Indiana, United States	Professed Religious, Congregation of Holy Cross	Fort Wayne–South Bend	Heroic Virtues
1923		John O'Neill (rel. name: Columba)	Introduction of Cause:				
1926		Jan Cieplak	17 August 1857 in Dąbrowa Górnicza, Poland	16 February 1926 in Passaic, New Jersey, United States	Apostolic Administrator of Mohilev; Archbishop of Vilnius	Rome and Vilnius	Heroic Virtues
1926		Jan Cieplak	Introduction of Cause: 23 June 1952				
1926		Anna Cordelia Zervas (rel. name: Mary Annella)	7 April 1900 in Moorhead, Minnesota, United States	14 August 1926 in Moorhead, Minnesota, United States	Professed Religious, Benedictine Nuns	Saint Cloud and Crookston	Heroic Virtues
1926		Anna Cordelia Zervas (rel. name: Mary Annella)	Introduction of Cause: 9 October 2025				
1927		Augustin Alfred Etlin (rel. name: Lukas)	25 February 1864 Sarnen, Obwalden, Switzerland	16 December 1927 Stanberry, Missouri	Professed Priest, Benedictines (Swiss-American Congregation)	Kansas City-Saint Joseph	Heroic Virtues
1927		Augustin Alfred Etlin (rel. name: Lukas)	Introduction of Cause: 13 August 1960				
1927		Maria Grazia Bellotti LaPercha	9 November 1882 in Laurenzana, Potenza, Italy	10 November 1927 in Palisades Park, New Jersey, United States	Married Layperson of the Archdiocese of Newark	Newark	Heroic Virtues
1927		Maria Grazia Bellotti LaPercha	Introduction of Cause:				
1931		Federico Salvador Ramón	9 March 1867 in Almería, Spain	13 March 1931 in San Diego, California, United States	Priest of the Diocese of Almería; Founder, Servants of the Immaculate Child Mary	Almería	Heroic Virtues
1931		Federico Salvador Ramón	Introduction of Cause: 29 November 1997				
1931		Ira Barnes Dutton (rel. name: Joseph)	27 April 1843 in Stowe, Vermont, United States	26 March 1931 in Honolulu, Hawaii, United States	Layperson of the Diocese of Honolulu; Member, Secular Franciscans	Honolulu	Heroic Virtues
1931		Ira Barnes Dutton (rel. name: Joseph)	Introduction of Cause: 10 May 2022				
1936		James Anthony Walsh	30 April 1891 in Cambridge, Massachusetts, United States	14 April 1936 in Maryknoll, New York, United States	Priest and Cofounder, Maryknoll Missionary Society; Titular Bishop of Seine-Assuan	New York	Heroic Virtues
1936		James Anthony Walsh	Introduction of Cause: 2010				
1936		Ángel Baraibar Moreno	7 September 1891 in San Juan, Puerto Rico	11 August 1936 in Illescas, Toledo, Spain	Priest of the Archdiocese of Toledo	Toledo	Heroic Virtues
1936		Ángel Baraibar Moreno	Introduction of Cause:				
1939		Anna Marie Lindenberg (rel. name: Theresa of Jesus)	20 May 1887 in Münster, North Rhine-Westphalia, Germany	11 April 1939 in Allentown, Pennsylvania, United States	Professed Religious, Carmelite Nuns of the Ancient Observance	Allentown	Heroic Virtues
1939		Anna Marie Lindenberg (rel. name: Theresa of Jesus)	Introduction of Cause: 2014				
1940		Lewis Thomas Wattson (rel. name: Paul James)	16 January 1863 in Millington, Maryland, United States	8 February 1940 in Graymoor, Garrison, New York, United States	Founder and Professed Priest, Franciscan Friars of the Atonement	New York	Heroic Virtues
1940		Lewis Thomas Wattson (rel. name: Paul James)	Introduction of Cause: 22 September 2015				
1940		Bernard John Quinn	15 January 1888 in Newark, New Jersey, United States	7 April 1940 in Brooklyn, New York, United States	Priest of the Diocese of Brooklyn	Brooklyn	Heroic Virtues
1940		Bernard John Quinn	Introduction of Cause: 15 June 2010				
1941		Rosa Maria Segale (rel. name: Blandina)	23 January 1850 in Cicagna, Genoa, Italy	23 February 1941 in Cincinnati, Ohio, United States	Professed Religious, Sisters of Charity of Cincinnati	Santa Fe and Cincinnati	Heroic Virtues
1941		Rosa Maria Segale (rel. name: Blandina)	Introduction of Cause: 25 June 2014				
1944		Joseph Verbis Lafleur	24 January 1912 in Ville Platte, Louisiana, United States	7 September 1944 off Sindangan Point, Liloy, Zamboanga del Norte, Philippines	Priest of the Military Ordinariate of the United States	Lafayette	Heroic Virtues
1944		Joseph Verbis Lafleur	Introduction of Cause: 5 September 2020				
1948		Rhoda Greer Wise	22 February 1888 in Cadiz, Ohio, United States	7 July 1948 in Canton, Ohio, United States	Married Layperson of the Diocese of Youngstown	Youngstown	Heroic Virtues
1948		Rhoda Greer Wise	Introduction of Cause: 7 October 2016				
1950		Nicholas Black Elk	October 1865 in Little Powder River, Wyoming, United States	17 August 1950 in Manderson, South Dakota, United States	Married Layperson of the Diocese of Rapid City	Rapid City	Heroic Virtues
1950		Nicholas Black Elk	Introduction of Cause: 17 May 2018				
1951		Francis Xavier Ford	11 January 1892 in Brooklyn, New York, United States	21 February 1952 in Guangzhou, Guangdong, China	Priest, Maryknoll Missionary Society; Bishop of Kaiying	Brooklyn	Martyr in odium fidei, uti fertur
1951		Francis Xavier Ford	Introduction of Cause: 30 November 2004				
1955		Mary Virginia Merrick	2 November 1866 in Washington, D.C., United States	10 January 1955 in Washington, D.C., United States	Layperson of the Archdiocese of Washington, D.C.; Founder, Christ Child Society	Washington, D.C.	Heroic Virtues
1955		Mary Virginia Merrick	Introduction of Cause: 2 April 2003				
1957		Cora Louise Yorgason Evans	9 July 1904 in Midvale, Utah, United States	30 March 1957 in Boulder Creek, California, United States	Married Layperson of the Diocese of Monterey	Monterey	Heroic Virtues
1957		Cora Louise Yorgason Evans	Introduction of Cause: 29 March 2012				
1957		Teresa Kearney (rel. name: Mary Kevin)	28 April 1875 in Knockenrahan, Arklow, County Wicklow, Ireland	17 October 1957 in Boston, Massachusetts, United States	Founder, Little Sisters of Saint Francis and the Franciscan Missionary Sisters for Africa	Lugazi and Boston	Heroic Virtues
1957		Teresa Kearney (rel. name: Mary Kevin)	Introduction of Cause: 6 May 2016				
1959		Charlene Marie Richard	13 January 1947 in Richard, Louisiana, United States	11 August 1959 in Lafayette, Louisiana, United States	Child of the Diocese of Lafayette	Lafayette	Heroic Virtues
1959		Charlene Marie Richard	Introduction of Cause: 11 January 2020				
1967		Vincent Robert Capodanno	13 February 1929 in Staten Island, New York, United States	4 September 1967 in Châu Lâm, Thăng Bình, Quảng Nam, Vietnam	Priest, Maryknoll Missionary Society; Priest of the Military Ordinariate of the United States	Military Ordinariate of the United States	Heroic Virtues
1967		Vincent Robert Capodanno	Introduction of Cause: 17 September 2004				
1968		Jean Martin Eyraud	11 November 1880 in Saint-Bonnet-en-Champsaur, Hautes-Alpes, France	5 February 1968 in Reserve, New Orleans, Louisiana, United States	Priest of the Archdiocese of New Orleans	New Orleans	Heroic Virtues
1968		Jean Martin Eyraud	Introduction of Cause: 3 November 2001				
1970		Giancarlo Rastelli	25 June 1933 in Pescara, Italy	2 February 1970 in Rochester, Minnesota, United States	Married layperson of the Diocese of Parma	Parma	Heroic Virtues
1970		Giancarlo Rastelli	Introduction of Cause: 30 September 2005				
1971		William Evans	15 January 1919 in Pittsburgh, Pennsylvania, United States	13 November 1971 in Nawabganj Upazila, Dhaka, Bangladesh	Professed Priest, Congregation of Holy Cross	Peoria	Martyr in odium fidei, uti fertur
1971		William Evans	Introduction of Cause:				
1972		Ernő Tindira	1892 in Latrobe, Pennsylvania, United States	19 January 1972 in Barbovo, Mukachevo, Ukraine	Professed Priest, Conventual Franciscans	Mukachevo	Martyr in odium fidei, uti fertur
1972		Ernő Tindira	Introduction of Cause: 3 January 2006				
1974		Daniel Foley (rel. name: Theodore of Mary Immaculate)	3 March 1913 in Springfield, Massachusetts, United States	9 October 1974 in Rome, Italy	Professed Priest, Passionists	Rome	Heroic Virtues
1974		Daniel Foley (rel. name: Theodore of Mary Immaculate)	Introduction of Cause: 19 December 2007				
1975		Michael Jerome Cypher (rel. name: Casimir)	2 January 1941 in Medford, Wisconsin, United States	25 June 1975 in Los Horcones, Trinidad, Guarizama, Olancho, Honduras	Professed Priest, Conventual Franciscans	Juticalpa	Martyr in odium fidei, uti fertur
1975		Michael Jerome Cypher (rel. name: Casimir)	Introduction of Cause:				
1976		Paul Michael Murphy	24 April 1939 in Wilmette, Illinois, United States	10 February 1976 in Mesa, Arizona, United States	Layperson of the Diocese of Phoenix; Consecrated Member, Miles Jesu	Phoenix	Heroic Virtues
1976		Paul Michael Murphy	Introduction of Cause: 24 March 2006				
1977		Auguste [Nonco] Pelafigue	10 January 1888 in Beaucens, Hautes-Pyrénées, United States	6 June 1977 in Arnaudville, Louisiana, United States	Layperson of the Diocese of Lafayette; Member, Apostleship of Prayer	Roman Catholic Diocese of Lafayette	Heroic Virtues
1977		Auguste [Nonco] Pelafigue	Introduction of Cause: 11 January 2020				
1977		George Willmann	18 February 1920 in Brooklyn, New York, United States	14 September 1977 in The Bronx, New York, United States	Professed Priest, Jesuits	Manila	Heroic Virtues
1977		George Willmann	Introduction of Cause:				
1980		Dorothy Day	8 November 1897 in Brooklyn, New York, United States	29 November 1980 in New York City, New York, United States	Layperson of the Diocese of New York; Member, Catholic Worker Movement	New York	Heroic Virtues
1980		Dorothy Day	Introduction of Cause: 10 March 2000				
1981		Juan Luis Ellacuria Echevarría (rel. name: Aloysius)	21 June 1905 in Yurre, Vizcaya, Spain	6 April 1981 in Los Angeles, California, United States	Professed Priest, Claretians	Los Angeles	Heroic Virtues
1981		Juan Luis Ellacuria Echevarría (rel. name: Aloysius)	Introduction of Cause: 11 April 2016				
1982		Vincent Joseph McCauley	8 March 1906 in Council Bluffs, Iowa, United States	1 November 1982 in Rochester, Minnesota, United States	Professed Priest, Congregation of Holy Cross; Bishop of Fort Portal	Fort Portal	Heroic Virtues
1982		Vincent Joseph McCauley	Introduction of Cause: 31 August 2006				
1982		William Slattery	7 May 1895 in Baltimore, Maryland, United States	10 August 1982 in Philadelphia, Pennsylvania, United States	Priest, Congregation of the Mission (Vincentians)	Philadelphia	Heroic Virtues
1982		William Slattery	Introduction of Cause:				
1983		José Luis Múzquiz de Miguel	14 October 1912 in Badajoz, Spain	21 June 1983 in Pembroke, Massachusetts, United States	Priest of the Opus Dei	Boston	Heroic Virtues
1983		José Luis Múzquiz de Miguel	Introduction of Cause: 2010				
1983		Terence James Cooke	1 March 1921 in New York City, New York, United States	6 October 1983 in New York City, New York, United States	Archbishop of New York; Cardinal	New York	Heroic Virtues
1983		Terence James Cooke	Introduction of Cause: 18 August 1992				
1984		Walter Ciszek	4 November 1904 in Shenandoah, Pennsylvania, United States	8 December 1984 in The Bronx, New York, United States	Professed Priest, Jesuits	Allentown	Heroic Virtues
1984		Walter Ciszek	Introduction of Cause: 11 October 1990				
1985		John Maronic	30 July 1922 in International Falls, Minnesota, United States	14 December 1985 in Belleville, Illinois, United States	Professed Priest, Missionary Oblates of Mary Immaculate; Founder, Victorious Missionaries	Belleville	Heroic Virtues
1985		John Maronic	Introduction of Cause:				
1989		Gabriel Wilhelmus Manek	18 August 1913 in Belu, East Nusa Tenggara, Indonesia	30 November 1989 in Lakewood, Colorado, United States	Professed Priest, Society of the Divine Word; Archbishop of Endeh; Founder, Daughters of Our Lady Queen of the Holy Rosary	Larantuka	Heroic Virtues
1989		Gabriel Wilhelmus Manek	Introduction of Cause: 19 October 2023				
1990		Bertha Bowman (rel. name: Thea)	29 December 1937 in Yazoo City, Mississippi, United States	30 March 1990 in Canton, Mississippi, United States	Professed Religious, Franciscan Sisters of Perpetual Adoration	Jackson	Heroic Virtues
1990		Bertha Bowman (rel. name: Thea)	Introduction of Cause:				
1993		María Belen Guzmán Florit (rel. name: Dominga)	3 September 1897 in Río Piedras, San Juan, Puerto Rico	16 January 1993 in Yauco, Puerto Rico	Founder, Dominican Sisters of Fatima	Ponce	Heroic Virtues
1993		María Belen Guzmán Florit (rel. name: Dominga)	Introduction of Cause: 15 June 2001				
1994		John Joseph McKniff	5 September 1905 in Media, Pennsylvania, United States	24 March 1994 in Miami, Florida, United States	Professed Priest, Augustinians	Chulucanas	Heroic Virtues
1994		John Joseph McKniff	Introduction of Cause: 8 April 2000				
1994		Rossella Petrellesse	1 April 1972 in Naples, Italy	18 September 1994 in Rochester, Minnesota, United States	Young Layperson of the Diocese of Acerra	Acerra	Heroic Virtues
1994		Rossella Petrellesse	Introduction of Cause: 13 September 2008				
1998		Ruth Van Kooy Pakaluk	19 March 1957 in East Orange, New Jersey	23 September 1998 in Worcester, Massachusetts	Married Layperson; Member, Opus Dei	Worcester	Heroic Virtues
1998		Ruth Van Kooy Pakaluk	Introduction of Cause: 29 September 2025				
1999		Matthias DeWitte Ward (rel. name: Martin Maria de Porres)	20 March 1918 in Charlestown, Boston, Massachusetts, United States	22 June 1999 in Rio de Janeiro, Brazil	Professed Priest, Conventual Franciscans	São João del Rei	Heroic Virtues
1999		Matthias DeWitte Ward (rel. name: Martin Maria de Porres)	Introduction of Cause:				
1999		Gabriel Gonsum Ganaka	24 May 1937 in Pankshin, Plateau, Nigeria	9 December 1999 in New York City, New York, United States	Archbishop of Jos	Jos	Heroic Virtues
1999		Gabriel Gonsum Ganaka	Introduction of Cause: 2014				
2000		Ida Peterfy	7 October 1922 in Košice, Slovakia	8 February 2000 in Northridge, Los Angeles, California, United States	Founder, Society Devoted to the Sacred Heart	Los Angeles	Heroic Virtues
2000		Ida Peterfy	Introduction of Cause: 19 April 2016				
2000		Gertrude Agnes Barber	16 September 1911 in Erie, Pennsylvania, United States	29 April 2000 in Beckley, West Virginia, United States	Layperson of the Diocese of Erie	Erie	Heroic Virtues
2000		Gertrude Agnes Barber	Introduction of Cause:				
2000		John Anthony Hardon	18 June 1914 in Midland, Pennsylvania, United States	30 December 2000 in Clarkston, Michigan, United States	Professed Priest, Jesuits	Saint Louis	Heroic Virtues
2000		John Anthony Hardon	Introduction of Cause: 31 May 2007				
2001		Leonard LaRue (rel. name: Marinus)	14 January 1914 in Philadelphia, Pennsylvania, United States	14 October 2001 in Newton, New Jersey, United States	Professed Religious, Benedictine (Ottilien Congregation)	Paterson	Heroic Virtues
2001		Leonard LaRue (rel. name: Marinus)	Introduction of Cause: 25 March 2019				
2002		Gwen Cecilia Billings Conicker	27 September 1939 in Chicago, Illinois, United States	15 June 2002 in Bloomingdale, Ohio, United States	Married Layperson of the Diocese of Steubenville; Cofounder, Apostolate for Family Consecration	Steubenville	Heroic Virtues
2002		Gwen Cecilia Billings Conicker	Introduction of Cause: 9 September 2007				
2004		Joseph Henry Cappel	16 November 1908 in Covington, Kentucky, United States	31 May 2004 in Curepto, Talca, Chile	Priest, Maryknoll Missionary Society	Talca	Heroic Virtues
2004		Joseph Henry Cappel	Introduction of Cause: 2018				
2004		Maria Esperanza Medrano Parra de Bianchini	22 November 1928 in San Rafael de Barrancas, Monagas, Venezuela	7 August 2004 in Long Beach, New York, United States	Married Layperson of the Dioceses of Los Teques and Metuchen	Los Teques and Metuchen	Heroic Virtues
2004		Maria Esperanza Medrano Parra de Bianchini	Introduction of Cause: 31 January 2010				
2004		Fernando Rielo Pardal	28 August 1923 in Madrid, Spain	6 December 2004 in New York City, New York, United States	Layperson of the Archdiocese of Madrid; Founder, Idente Missionaries of Christ the Redeemer	Madrid	Heroic Virtues
2004		Fernando Rielo Pardal	Introduction of Cause:				
2006		Joseph Walijewski	25 April 1914 in Grand Rapids, Michigan, United States	11 April 2006 in Lima, Peru	Priest of the Diocese of La Crosse	La Crosse	Heroic Virtues
2006		Joseph Walijewski	Introduction of Cause: 1 May 2013				
2006		Richard Thomas	1 March 1928 in Seffner, Florida, United States	8 May 2006 in Las Cruces, New Mexico, United States	Professed Priest, Jesuits	Las Cruces	Heroic Virtues
2006		Richard Thomas	Introduction of Cause: 11 November 2025				
2006		William Edward [Bill] Atkinson	4 January 1946 in Philadelphia, Pennsylvania, United States	15 September 2006 in Villanova, Pennsylvania, United States	Professed Priest, Augustinians	Philadelphia	Heroic Virtues
2006		William Edward [Bill] Atkinson	Introduction of Cause: 24 April 2017				
2006		William Bryce Wasson	21 December 1923 in Phoenix, Arizona, United States	16 August 2006 in Cottonwood, Arizona, United States	Priest of the Diocese of Cuernavaca	Cuernavaca	Heroic Virtues
2006		William Bryce Wasson	Introduction of Cause:				
2008		Thomas Vander Woude	24 April 1942 in Sioux Falls, South Dakota, United States	8 September 2008 in Nokesville, Virginia, United States	Married Layperson of the Diocese of Arlington	Arlington	Offer of Life
2008		Thomas Vander Woude	Introduction of Cause:				
2009		Irving Charles Houle [Francis]	27 December 1925 in Wilson, Michigan, United States	3 January 2009 in Marquette, Michigan, United States	Married Layperson of the Diocese of Marquette	Marquette	Heroic Virtues
2009		Irving Charles Houle [Francis]	Introduction of Cause:				
2015		Michelle Christine Duppong	25 January 1984 in Wheat Ridge, Colorado, United States	25 December 2015 in Haymarsh, North Dakota, United States	Layperson of the Diocese of Bismarck; Member, Fellowship of Catholic University Students	Bismarck	Heroic Virtues
2015		Michelle Christine Duppong	Introduction of Cause:				
2015		John Rick Miller	10 July 1948; New York City, New York, United States	30 May 2015; Delray Beach, Florida, United States	Married Layperson of the Archdiocese of Miami; Founder, Mission for the Love of God Worldwide	Miami	Heroic Virtues
2015		John Rick Miller	Introduction of Cause:				
2019		Kendrick Castillo	14 March 2001 in Denver, Colorado, United States	7 May 2019 in Highlands Ranch, Colorado, United States	Young Layperson of the Diocese of Colorado Springs	Colorado Springs	Offer of Life
2019		Kendrick Castillo	Introduction of Cause:				
2020		Daniel Mark Anderl	13 July 2000 in New Jersey, United States	19 July in North Brunswick, New Jersey, United States	Young Layperson	Metuchen	Offer of Life
2020		Daniel Mark Anderl	Introduction of Cause: 30 September 2025				

=== Group martyrs ===
Image	Saints and Servants of God	Born	Died	Church Status	Diocese	Type of Cause
Martyrs of "La Florida" Missions (1549–1715)
	Luis de Cáncer	ca. 1500 in Barbastro, Huesca, Spain	26 June 1549 in Safety Harbor, Florida, United States	Professed Priest, Dominicans	Pensacola-Tallahassee	Martyr in odium fidei, uti fertur
	56 Martyrs of "La Florida" Missions	Died: early June 1549 to July 1715 in Florida, United States		Professed Priests and Religious, Dominicans, Jesuits, Franciscan Friars Minor and Hospitallers of Saint John of God; Married and Young Laypersons of the Dioceses of Pensacola–Tallahassee, Saint Augustine, Orlando and Venice	Pensacola-Tallahassee	Martyr in odium fidei, uti fertur
		Introduction of Cause: 18 July 2015; Declared "Venerable": Beatified:				
Shreveport Martyrs of Charity (1873)
	Isidore Quémerais	9 September 1847 in Pleine-Fougères, Ille-et-Vilaine, France	15 September 1873 in Shreveport, Louisiana, United States	Priest of the Diocese of Shreveport	Shreveport	Offer of Life
	Jean Pierre	29 September 1831 in Lanloup, Côtes-d'Armor, France	16 September 1873 in Shreveport, Louisiana, United States	Priest of the Diocese of Shreveport	Shreveport	Offer of Life
	Jean-Marie Biler	18 November 1849 in Plourivo, Côtes-d'Armor, France	26 September 1873 in Shreveport, Louisiana, United States	Priest of the Diocese of Shreveport	Shreveport	Offer of Life
	Louis-Marie Gergaud	22 March 1832 in Héric, Loire-Atlantique, France	1 October 1873 in Shreveport, Louisiana, United States	Priest of the Diocese of Shreveport	Shreveport	Offer of Life
	François Le Vézouët	10 August 1833 in Brélidy, Côtes-d'Armor, France	8 October 1873 in Shreveport, Louisiana, United States	Priest of the Diocese of Shreveport	Shreveport	Offer of Life
		Introduction of Cause: 20 October 2020; Declared "Venerable": Beatified:				
Modern Martyrs of Korea (1901–1974)
	James Maginn	15 November 1911 in Butte, Montana, United States	4 July 1950 in Samcheok, Gangwon, South Korea	Priest, Missionary Society of Saint Columban	Seoul	Martyr in odium fidei, uti fertur
	Patrick Thomas Brennan	13 March 1901 in Chicago, Illinois, United States	24 September 1950 in Daejeon, South Korea	Priest, Missionary Society of Saint Columban; Apostolic Prefect of Gwangju	Seoul	Martyr in odium fidei, uti fertur
	Patrick James Byrne	26 October 1888 in Washington, D.C., United States	25 November 1950 in Chunggang, Chagang, North Korea	Priest, Maryknoll Missionary Society; Titular Bishop of Gazera; Apostolic Delegate to Korea	Seoul	Martyr in odium fidei, uti fertur
		Introduction of Cause: 26 April 2013; Declared "Venerable": Beatified:				
Martyrs of El Salvador (1980)
	Mary Elizabeth Clarke (rel. name: Maura)	13 January 1931 in Queens, New York, United States	2 December 1980 in Santa Teresa, San Juan Nonualco, La Paz, United States	Professed Religious, Maryknoll Sisters of Saint Dominic	San Salvador	Martyr in odium fidei, uti fertur
	Ita Catherine Ford	23 April 1940 in Bronx, New York, United States	2 December 1980 in Santa Teresa, San Juan Nonualco, La Paz, United States	Professed Religious, Maryknoll Sisters of Saint Dominic	San Salvador	Martyr in odium fidei, uti fertur
	Dorothea Lu [Dorothy] Kazel	30 June 1939 in Cleveland, Ohio, United States	2 December 1980 in Santa Teresa, San Juan Nonualco, La Paz, United States	Professed Religious, Ursuline Sisters of the Roman Union	San Salvador	Martyr in odium fidei, uti fertur
	Jean Marie Donovan	10 April 1953 in Westport, Connecticut, United States	2 December 1980 in Santa Teresa, San Juan Nonualco, La Paz, United States	Layperson of the Diocese of Cleveland	San Salvador	Martyr in odium fidei, uti fertur
		Introduction of Cause: Declared "Venerable": Beatified:				

== See also ==
- List of American proposed candidates for sainthood
- Blessed
- Catholic Church in the United States § Servants of God and those declared venerable, beatified, and canonized saints
- Dicastery for the Causes of Saints
- List of Brazilian saints
- List of Canadian Roman Catholic saints
- List of Canarian saints
- List of Central American and Caribbean saints
- List of Filipino saints, blesseds, and servants of God
- List of Mexican saints
- List of Saints from Africa
- List of Saints from India
- List of Saints from Oceania
- List of Scandinavian saints
- List of South American saints
- List of European saints
- Saint
- Servant of God
- Venerable
