= Jack McAuliffe =

Jack McAuliffe may refer to:

- Jack McAuliffe (American football) (1901–1971), American football player
- Jack McAuliffe (boxer) (1866–1937), Irish-born American boxer
- Jack McAuliffe (brewer) (1945–2025), American microbrewer
- Jack McAuliffe, a fictional character in The Company

== See also ==
- John McAuliffe (1886–1959), American missionary of the Brothers of the Sacred Heart
- John B. McAuliffe (1892–1954), American football player and coach
