= Celestina Bottego =

Venerable Celestina Bottego MS
- Born: 20 December 1895; Glendale, Ohio, United States
- Died: 20 August 1980 (aged 84); Parma, Italy

Celestina Bottego, MS (20 December 1895 – 20 August 1980) was an American-born Italian Catholic nun who established the Xaverian Missionary Sisters of Mary, a group of missionaries. She was proclaimed venerable in 2013.

== Life ==
Celestina Bottego was born in Glendale, Ohio on 20 December 1895 as the second of three children of Giambattista Bottego and Mary Healy. They had each emigrated separately to the United States and first met in California. Celestina was the niece of the Parmesan explorer Vittorio Bottego. Bottego spent most of her early life in Butte, Montana, until the age of 15. The death of her uncle in 1897 during an expedition to Africa caused the Bottegos to return to Parma to care for her grandparents. Her father took Maria and Vittorio with him, and Celestina accompanied her mother in 1910.

Bottego continued her studies in Pisa and qualified as an English teacher. She taught at schools for over two decades in Parma. In 1922 she chose to become a Benedictine oblate. Bottego help found the diocesan chapter of Catholic Action to devote her time to charitable activities. In 1924, her sister Maria became a Franciscan missionary sister and left for India.

In 1935 Bottgp became an English teacher at the Institute of the Xaverian Missionaries. It was at this time she made a month-long visit to India where she served with her sister Maria caring for the sick. Father James Spagnolo of the Xaverian Institute suggested establishing a women's branch of the Xaverian Missionaries. Although initially, she declined, about a year later, in mid-1945, she established this branch with Spagnolo. In 1966, she resigned as General Superior, leaving to others the direction of the Congregation.

Bottego died on 20 August 1980 in Parma.

== Beatification process ==
The beatification process commenced under Pope John Paul II on 24 November 1994 with the commencement of a local diocesan process in Parma that accorded her the posthumous title Servant of God. The process spanned from 22 April 1995 until a short while later, on 5 November 1997, and was granted the formal decree of ratification on 5 June 1998 for the cause to proceed. The Positio was compiled and submitted to the Congregation for the Causes of Saints in Rome in 2001. Bottego was proclaimed to be venerable on 31 October 2013 by Pope Francis.
