= Mountjoy Castle =

Ruined castle in County Tyrone, Northern Ireland

Coordinates: 54°33′32″N 6°36′28″W

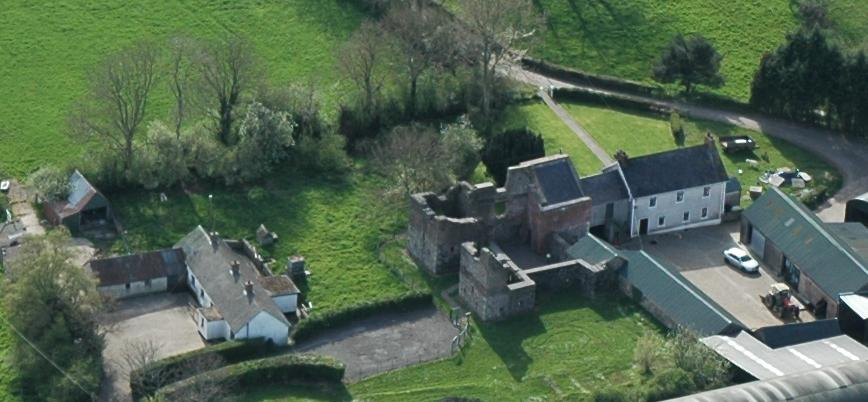
Aerial view of Mountjoy Castle

Mountjoy Castle is a ruined fortification situated near the village of Brockagh, in Magheralamfield townland in County Tyrone, Northern Ireland, on a hill overlooking Lough Neagh. The castle played a role in the Irish Rebellion of 1641 when it was captured by the forces of Felim O'Neill of Kinard under the command of Turlough Gruama O'Quinn.

The castle is a State Care Historic Monument in the Dungannon and South Tyrone Borough Council area, at grid ref: H9015 6870.

== See also ==
- Castles in Northern Ireland
