= Sisters of the Holy Spirit and Mary Immaculate =

- Founder: Mother Margaret Mary Healy Murphy, SHSp
- Type: Catholic religious order
- Headquarters: San Antonio, Texas
- Location: United States, Africa
- Superior general: Sr Geraldine Klein, SHSp
- Affiliations: Catholic Church
- Website: https://www.shsp.org/index.html
- Formerly called: Sisters of the Holy Ghost

The Sisters of the Holy Spirit and Mary Immaculate (founded as the Sisters of the Holy Ghost) are a Catholic female religious order based in Texas. They are the oldest order of sisters in the state, established in 1893 in San Antonio by Margaret Mary Healy Murphy, who created the group in order to help with her mission of educating African Americans in San Antonio. The order created the first free, private school for the Black community in that city.
