= Margaret Mary Healy Murphy =

Irish-American nun, activist and educator

Servant of God Margaret Mary Healy-Murphy
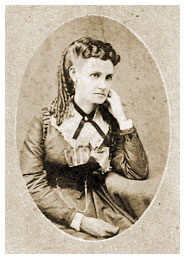
- Margaret Mary Healy-Murphy, c. 1870
- Born: 4 May 1833; Cahirciveen, County Kerry, Ireland
- Died: 25 August 1907 (aged 74); San Antonio, Texas, United States

Margaret Mary Jane Healy Murphy (May 4, 1833 - August 25, 1907) was an Irish–American Catholic religious sister and early civil rights activist. She was the founder of the Sisters of the Holy Spirit and Mary Immaculate, the first order of sisters in the state of Texas, as well as the first free private school for African Americans in San Antonio.

She and her family crossed the Atlantic Ocean and eventually moved westward from West Virginia to Mexico and Texas, where her family were owners of slaves before the American Civil War. She lived in Corpus Christi, Texas, until her mid-fifties. After the death of her husband, she embarked on her life's vocation. Throughout her life, she helped the poor and reached out to help African Americans and Mexican Americans.

Her cause for canonization was initiated in June 2021.

== Biography ==
=== Early life and education ===
Murphy was the oldest of four children and was born and raised in Cahirciveen in County Kerry. Murphy was a relative of Daniel O'Connell, who worked politically to end slavery through the British Parliament system. Her mother died when Murphy was five. Her father was a doctor who helped the poor in the neighboring regions of Cahirciveen.

After the death of her mother, Mary and Johanna Murphy, her aunts, helped take care of the children. After the Act of Union, Ireland became severely impoverished and some of the family decided to emigrate. Most of the family came to work on a farm in West Virginia, however, her sister, Jeannie Healy went to a boarding school in Namur. Murphy, then only six, wanted to stay with her father who did not want to emigrate at the time. She did, and was enrolled in a school in Ireland that gave her a solid educational foundation. Murphy's father later volunteered to be a ship's physician on a ship emigrating to the United States.

Murphy and her father arrived in Virginia in 1845 when she was twelve. She and her father moved on to live and help on the family farm in West Virginia. Murphy continued her schooling for a while in West Virginia. She was also involved with the family's Sunday School for both adults and children and helped teach reading and writing to African American plantation workers.

=== Moving west ===
When the family moved west to Texas, Murphy's father died along the way in New Orleans. Murphy, her aunts, uncles and two brothers moved further south to Matamoros, Tamaulipas where Murphy would work with her aunts, running a hotel, from 1846 to 1850. Her brother and uncle went to California in the Gold Rush and she never saw them again. She met John Bernard Murphy in Matamoros. He had been stationed there while working as a volunteer in General Zachary Taylor's army. Murphy married John in Matamoros on May 4, 1849 in the Matamoros Cathedral. In 1850, Murphy and her husband settled in Corpus Christi, where her husband owned a ranch and worked as a lawyer. Murphy also brought her two aunts, Johanna and Mary Murphy, to live with them on the ranch. The Murphys also owned slaves who worked on the ranch.

=== Corpus Christi ===
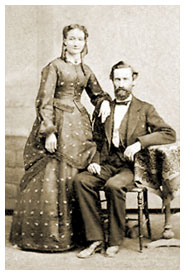
Margaret Mary Healy Murphy and J.B. Murphy

Corpus Christi after the Civil War had suffered greatly, especially because of the blockade of the Texas coast, which resulted in food and supply shortages. The blockade lasted around four years. Troops from the North also hit the city very hard and when the Murphys came back to their home, many of their belongings had been destroyed. To help others out, Murphy ran a soup kitchen from her ranch and then set up a small clinic. A homeless Hispanic girl, named Delphine, was virtually adopted by the couple and Delphine became Murphy's close friend. Murphy was concerned about the poor, especially poor blacks in the city. In 1865, the Murphys rented out their ranch and moved into the heart of Corpus Christi.

In 1867, a yellow fever outbreak took place in Corpus Christi which killed nearly a third of the population. One of the patients Murphy tended was named Mrs. Delaney, who was dying, and asked that someone take care of her daughter, Minnie. Murphy and her husband adopted Minnie. Another girl who was not related to Minnie was also adopted at around the same time. The Murphys sent their girls away to boarding school because there were few Catholic schools in Texas.

Murphy and her husband realized that there needed to be more educational resources for children in Texas. Murphy requested help from Bishop Claude Marie Dubuis, who sent three Sisters of Mary in Belgium to Waco in 1873. One of the sisters sent to Waco was Jeannie Healy, who was Murphy's sister.

Hurricanes in 1875 severely damaged Corpus Christi and destroyed many homes. Murphy responded by creating shelters which started to be called "Mrs. Murphy's hospital for the poor" and which "welcomed Anglos, Mexicans and blacks" alike. The hospital did not see long-term success, however, because of racial prejudice affecting her work.

In 1875, John was invited as a representative at the First Constitutional Convention for Texas, held in Austin. When he returned, he was persuaded to run for mayor of Corpus Christi, which he held from 1880 to 1884.

On July 4, 1884, John Murphy died, leaving Murphy with a large inheritance. Soon after John's death, Murphy's aunts, Johanna and Mary, also died and Murphy was alone. Murphy decided to use her wealth to continue to help others, especially the poor and black people in Texas.

In 1884, Murphy traveled to Temple in order to help teach black children. She was accompanied by Delphine and a volunteer. However, the program that she developed there was unsuccessful. Murphy then moved to San Antonio.

=== Saint Peter Claver School ===
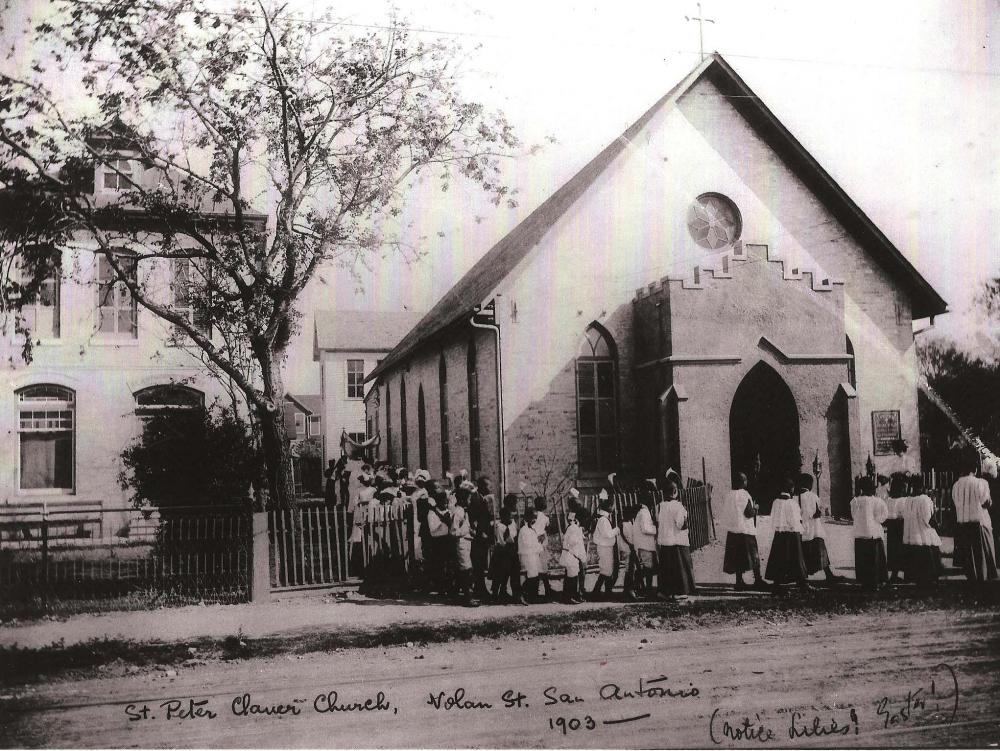
St. Peter Claver Church, 1903

Murphy traced the origin to her vocation to build a school for African Americans to a sermon given by Father John Maloney on May 29, 1887, at Saint Mary's Church in San Antonio. The sermon encouraged people to help develop schools to teach black children in the city. Murphy told her friend, "This will be my work someday; it is the great need of this time. The Holy Spirit has helped me to make this decision."

African Americans in San Antonio were often neglected by educational and missionary efforts normally provided by the Catholic Church. This didn't change until Murphy came to San Antonio in 1887. Murphy requested permission to start a school for African Americans from Bishop John C. Neraz, which he gave with "enthusiastic approval."

Murphy sold some properties she owned in San Patricio County and used the funds to purchase space on the East Side of San Antonio to be used as a school for African Americans. The lot itself was purchased on October 14, 1887, for the price of $2,800. There was opposition from residents of the area, which was at the time white only. In addition, difficult laws demanding strict segregation of white and black people obstructed progress in sourcing supplies to build the school. San Antonio already had a reputation for aggressively opposing schools for black children. However, Murphy was determined to force San Antonians to pay attention to racial issues, which is why she chose the white neighborhood for the school.

The school was completed in 1888 and named the Saint Peter Claver Colored Mission and was the first Catholic school for blacks in San Antonio. It was also the first free school for African Americans in the city. The school was named for a Jesuit saint, Saint Peter Claver, who had spent his life helping slaves in Cartagena, present-day Colombia. In order to staff the church with priests, she sought help from the Society of St Joseph of the Sacred Heart (Josephites), which had a mission of ministry to African Americans. Murphy's finished church had 500 seats, a rectory and a school, all of which was financed solely by Murphy. Bishop Neraz dedicated the building and its name on Sunday, September 16, 1888. The school had 120 students attending on opening day which was September 17, 1888.

In 1892, the school had two hundred students: both day students and also boarding students. However, expenses, which had come to nearly $10,000 of Murphy's own personal money, and continued to mount, were beginning to take their toll. So were the racist attitudes of many in the city. A bank manager told Murphy that "for your senseless Negro venture I will give you not a penny, but if you assure me that you will exclude Negroes, I will gladly erect an entire new school." Murphy continued on and received donations from individuals, and a commission of $900 from the Josephites.

Murphy was not the only one who faced racial prejudice. Teachers for the school were harassed and threatened daily and over time, she lost her volunteer staff. The Ku Klux Klan was involved with terrorizing the teachers. In order to fix this problem, she decided to start her own order so that she could staff the school with sisters that she recruited.

Over time, Murphy would recruit sisters from both Ireland and from the local Mexican American community. The new order, the first congregation of sisters created in Texas, was called Sisters of the Holy Ghost. The first four sisters made public vows to join the order on June 9, 1893. As the founder of the congregation, Murphy was named Reverend Mother Margaret Mary. Murphy made the first of four trips to Ireland in July 1896, where she recruited young women to join her order.

=== Expansion ===
In January 1898, Murphy was invited to build a school for African American children in Victoria, Texas. Murphy purchased land in Victoria for $4,500 and began to renovate a house for the sisters and the school, which opened in February 1898.

Murphy created a retreat out of her San Patricio ranch, where she had also built a chapel. She often invited sisters to her retreat from other congregations in San Antonio to visit. The ranch was later demolished by Hurricane Celia in 1970.

Murphy died in the St. Peter Claver Convent in San Antonio on August 25, 1907.

== Legacy ==
Murphy's work led to the establishment of thirty nine missions throughout Texas, Louisiana and Mississippi. In the late 1960s, her religious order was renamed the Sisters of the Holy Spirit and Mary Immaculate. The Sisters of the Holy Spirit also currently have outreach missions in Mexico and Zambia. Murphy's school later changed its name to the Healy Murphy Center. The Healy Murphy Center is currently operational and is located on Nolan Street in San Antonio, helping students who have dropped out of school. The school has continued to have an excellent reputation for academics. It also began to integrate in the 1940s and later became a non-religious charter school. In 2012, the Healy Murphy Center was renovated and rededicated.

Her cause for canonization was initiated in June 2021.

== Read more ==
- Turley, Mary Immaculata (1969). Mother Margaret Mary Healy-Murphy: A Biography. San Antonio, Texas: Naylor Co. ISBN 9780811103268.
