= John McAuliffe =

Venerable Norbert McAuliffe SC
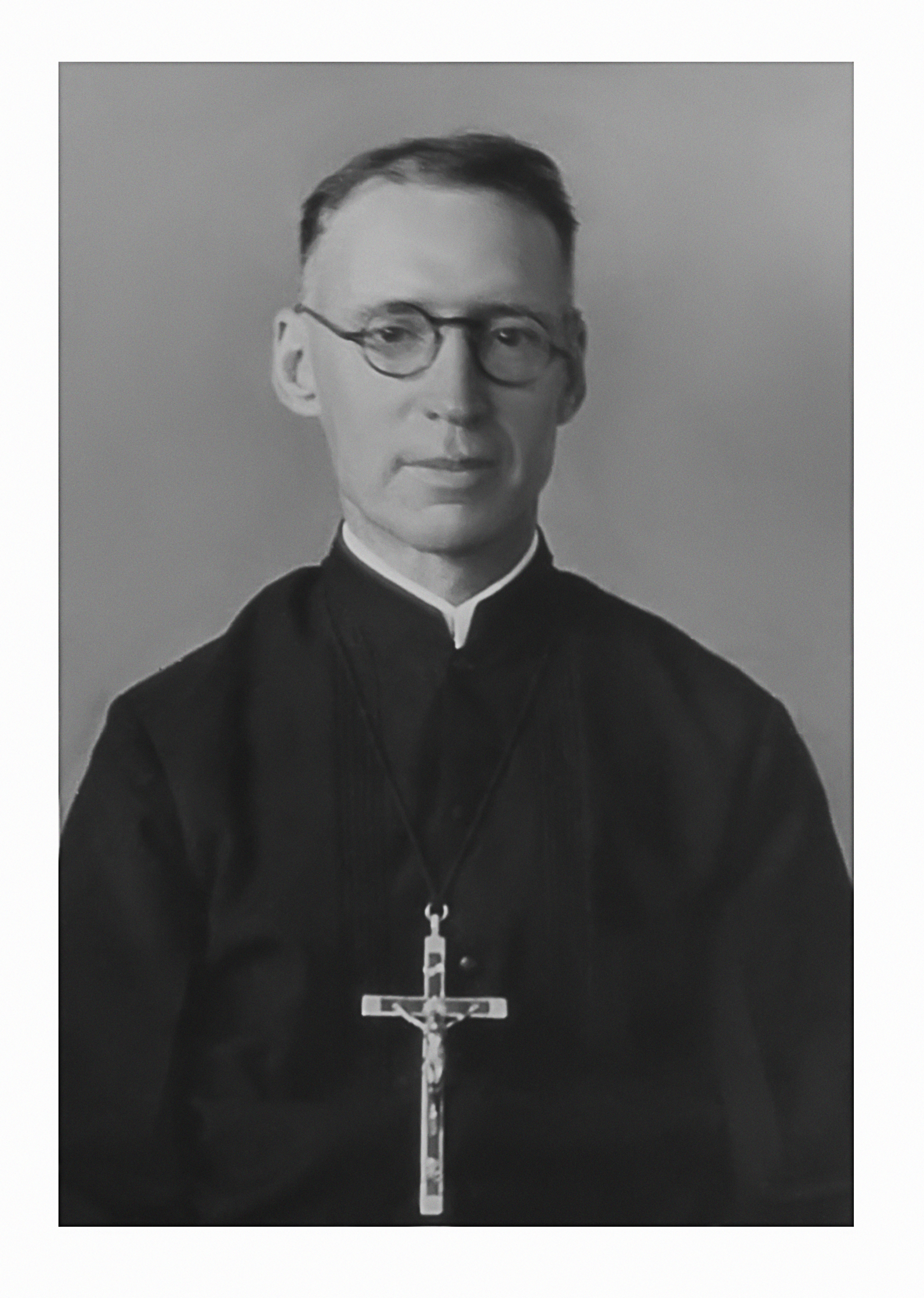
- Br. Norbert McAuliffe SC, 1941

Missionary
- Born: September 30, 1886; Manhattan, New York, United States
- Died: July 3, 1959 (aged 72); Alokolum, Gulu, Uganda
- Venerated in: Roman Catholic Church

John Francis Joseph McAuliffe, SC (September 30, 1886 – July 3, 1959), also known by his religious name Norbert McAuliffe, was an American Catholic religious brother known for his missionary work in Uganda. He was born in Manhattan and later became a professed member of the Brothers of the Sacred Heart, working for them in education for over 50 years.

McAuliffe died in 1959 in Gulu, Uganda. Pope Francis declared McAuliffe as Venerable in 2018.

== Early years ==
John McAuliffe was born on September 30, 1886, in New York City to Daniel and Elizabeth "Lizzie" McAuliffe, both Irish immigrants. Daniel was a dockworker in Manhattan. Lizzie was Daniel's second wife. The couple had five children, three of whom lived to adulthood: Walter, John, and Elizabeth or Lillian. John McAuliffe was baptized at St. Rose Church in Lower Manhattan on November 7, 1886. Daniel died after a short illness in 1893 and Lizzie died in 1895.

After Lizzie died, McAuliffe's sister, Elizabeth, was sent to live with their half-brother. McAuliffe and his brother Walter were accepted into the St. Agnes Home and School for Children in Sparkill, New York, run by the Dominican Sisters of Sparkill. After St. Agnes Home was destroyed by fire in 1899, Walter was sent to the New York Catholic Protectory in the Bronx. McAuliffe went to a temporary facility for St. Agnes in Troy, New York.

In early 1902, Stanislaus Keating, a religious brother with the Brothers of the Sacred Heart, visited the new St. Agnes Home in Sparkill. Keating spoke to the young people about his work as a missionary, especially in orphanages. As an orphan himself, McAuliffe was inspired by Keating to join his brotherhood. At age 16, he left St. Agnes Home on April 30, 1902, and entered the Brothers of the Sacred Heart formation house in Metuchen, New Jersey, on May 1, 1902.

== Teacher in the United States ==
Already formed by the Dominican Sisters of Sparkill to follow a pattern of prayer and common life, McAuliffe adapted quickly to the spartan life led by the brothers at Metuchen. McAuliffe received the habit on November 14, 1902, and took the name Norbert. He made his first commitment, or vows, on November 21, 1903, at Metuchen. After taking his vows, Sacred Heart assigned him to teach first- and second-graders at St. Patrick’s School in Indianapolis, Indiana.

As a teacher, McAuliffe would try to relate all school courses, including the sciences, to what he viewed as the power and grace of God. McAuliffe took to the brothers' mission of education immediately. He lived and worked with young people in schools in several places and grew more skilled in his teaching, eventually becoming the school principal and superior of the local community. Sacred Heart later assigned him as a teacher to schools in Meridian, Mississippi; Muskogee, Oklahoma; and Bay St. Louis, Mississippi. He took perpetual vows at Bay St. Louis on July 10, 1910.

McAuliffe completed his high school studies in 1915. He attended the teacher training program operated by Sacred Heart at St. Stanislaus College in Bay St Louis, where he graduated in 1917. Over the next few years, McAuliffe attended summer programs at Loyola University New Orleans. He graduated with a Bachelor of Science degree in 1921. In 1923, he was awarded an Indiana teacher's license. McAuliffe's later assignments included Vicksburg, Mississippi; New Orleans, Louisiana; Donaldsonville, Louisiana; and Washington, Indiana.

== Missionary work ==
=== Grand novitiate in Spain – 1930 to 1931 ===
In 1903, McAuliffe attended the grand novitiate in Errenteria, Spain, a nine-month sabbatical program run by Sacred Heart in different cities. During the Novitiate, 45 French brothers arrived at Errenteria, having left France due to a law controlling religious orders. One of these brothers was Gabriel Juge, known as Brother Albertinus. He was appointed as novice master at the novitiate.

Gage recruited McAuliffe and several other brothers to serve as its first missionaries in the Protectorate of Uganda, a British colony. When the group leader became sick and could not go, Gage asked McAuliffe to take his place. McAuliffe and three other brothers (Oswin, Camillus, and Coleman) left the United States on July 23, 1931, sailing from New York City to Le Havre, France. They then sailed to Africa. The brothers arrived in the city of Gulu in Uganda, on August 29, 1931.

=== Service in Uganda – 1931 to 1939 ===
Initially, the brothers served as teachers at St. Louis College, a secondary school in Gulu. The college had been started by Italian missionaries, but the local authorities wanted the children instructed in English. While his students were doing their classwork, McAuliffe would be praying the rosary. During his lunch break, he would be in the chapel praying. The local Acholi people began referring to McAuliffe as Dano Ma Lego, “the man who prays.” He was considered a kind person who did not speak negatively about anyone. McAuliffe was also an ascetic, taking the smallest portions of the communal meals. The brothers later opened a junior high school, St. Joseph, and an agricultural school in Gulu.

=== Service in United States – 1939 to 1945 ===
McAuliffe returned to New York for his first visit home in ten years on October 15, 1939, a few weeks after the start of World War II. Because Great Britain was a combatant in the war, McAuliffe could not return to Uganda. Returning to his missionary work would not be possible. Sacred Heart instead assigned him as director of their novicitate in Metuchen. During these six years, he sustained what was, in fact, an impoverished community, living on the food it grew during difficult social times.

Many of the witnesses of that period describe McAuliffe's demeanor. His characteristic virtue was charity. He was said to have given the best he had to people with humility and kindness.

=== Service in Uganda – 1946 to 1959 ===
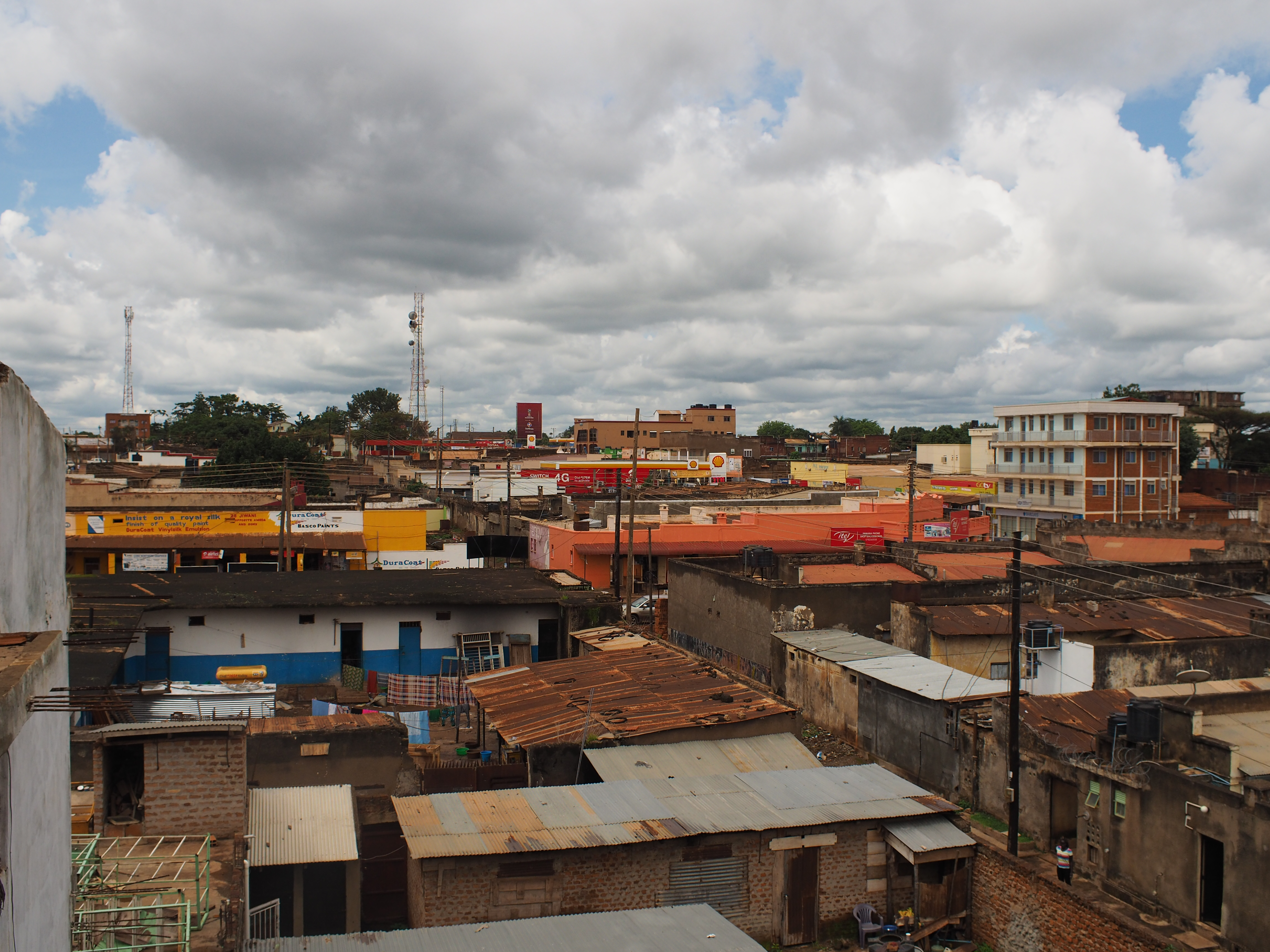
Gulu, Uganda (2018)

World War II ended in June 1945, and McAuliffe returned to Gulu in February 1946. At that point, Sacred Heart had six brothers in Uganda. He established a facility in Gulu for the formation of Ugandan men as brothers. Sacred Heart appointed him as director-general of all of its activities in East Africa. During the war years, St. Louis College, now called St. Aloysius College, had relocated to Nyapea. McAuliffe started a new secondary school in Gulu called St. Joseph College. Under McAuliffe's leadership, the Sacred Heart brothers developed new schools in Okaru in Sudan and Nyeri in British Kenya, along with a formation center for brothers in Alokolum in Uganda.

In 1952, Sacred Heart appointed the 65-year-old McAuliffe for a third term as director-general. During this period, he was forced to make a quick trip to the United States for medical treatment. By 1954, Sacred Hearth had 21 missionaries, six African novices, and 53 postulants in the regions. The first Ugandan novices took their vows in 1955. McAuliffe spent his remaining years working with the novices.

=== Death ===
On July 3, 1959, after a short illness, McAuliffe died in Gulu at age 71. Bishop Giovanni Battista Cesana of the Diocese of Gulu blessed McAuliffe's body and planned the funeral mass in Gulu. As a sign of their reverence for McAuliffe, the brothers sat in the chancel of the church while the attending priests sat in the body of the church.

== Veneration ==
After McAuliffe's death, the bishops of Uganda over the succeeding decades invoked his name as an intercessor for all Ugandans. In 1994, the Diocese of Gulu reviewed McAuliffe's life story and interviewed people who were affected by him. On June 9, 1995, the Vatican affirmed the diocesan investigation's outcome, according McAuliffe the title, Servant of God.

The McAuliffe positio, or set of documents, was then examined by the Congregation for the Causes of Saints (CCC) in Rome. In 2015, the initial review by the CCC affirmed the experience of the many witnesses. On May 8, 2018, the CCC consultors confirmed that McAuliffe had exhibited the theological and cardinal virtues to a heroic degree. On May 19, 2018, Pope Francis declared McAuliffe as Venerable.
