= Brockagh =

Village in County Tyrone, Northern Ireland

Coordinates: 54°33′N 6°36′W

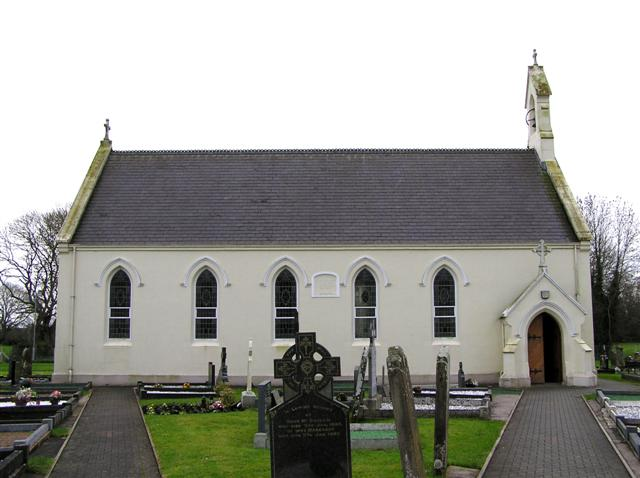
St Brigids Catholic Church

Brockagh (or Brocagh, from Irish Brocach 'badger warren') is a village in County Tyrone, Northern Ireland. It is on the western shore of Lough Neagh, about 7 kilometres (4.3 mi) east of Coalisland and north of Washing Bay. It lies within the Mid Ulster District Council area.

== Features ==
The village consists mostly of single dwellings and farm buildings, although some in-depth development has recently taken place to the north of Mountjoy Road and to the west of Ballybeg Road. Land adjacent to the Duckingstool River may be subject to flooding.

== Places of interest ==
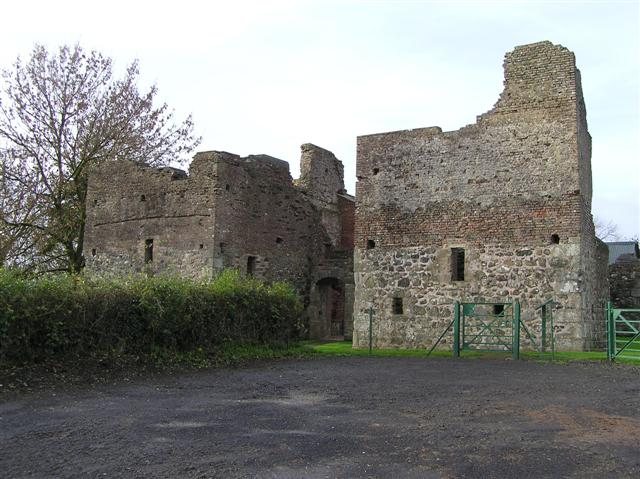
Mountjoy Castle

- Mountjoy Castle is situated near the village of Brocagh, on a hill overlooking Lough Neagh. It was built by Lord Mountjoy in 1602 and partly burned in 1643.

== People ==
- Tom McGurk
- Aidan Corr
- Venerable Mary Angeline Teresa McCrory

== Education ==
- St. Brigid's Primary School, Brocagh

== See also ==
- List of villages in Northern Ireland
- List of towns in Northern Ireland
