= Mary Angeline Teresa McCrory =

Religious sister and foundress

Venerable Mary Angeline Teresa McCrory OCarm
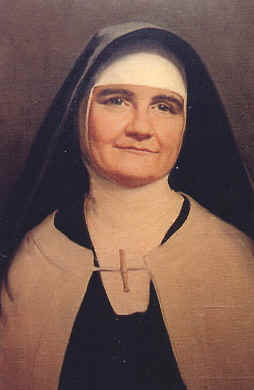

Founder
- Born: Brigid Teresa McCrory; January 21, 1893; Clintycracken, Brockagh, County Tyrone, Ireland
- Died: January 21, 1984 (aged 91); Germantown, New York, United States

Mary Angeline Teresa McCrory (January 21, 1893 – January 21, 1984) was an Ireland-born immigrant to the United States. She was a Roman Catholic religious sister who worked as an advocate for the impoverished elderly, founding a new religious congregation for this purpose, the Carmelite Sisters for the Aged and Infirm. Her cause for beatification has been opened, and her life has been acknowledged by the Holy See as one of heroic virtue. She was declared as venerable by the Catholic Church.

== Early life in Ireland ==
McCrory was born in the Townland of Clintycracken in Co. Tyrone. She was born into a devoutly Catholic Irish family. She was baptized Brigid Teresa McCrory in The Chapel of St. Brigid at Brockagh near the ruins of Mountjoy Castle in County Tyrone, Ireland.

== Formative years in Scotland ==
Holy Family Catholic Church in Mossend, Scotland

When she was seven years old, her family moved to Scotland and settled in Mossend, moving into a house beside Holy Family Church. There in Mossend, under Rev. Dean Cronin's direction, that the young Bridget McCrory began to receive her calling to religious life. She found herself attracted to the life of the Sisters who came begging alms for the aged and infirm men and women in their care. At the age of 9 or 10, on her own, she changed the spelling of her name from Brigid to Bridget due in part to her love of the French language.

Bridget would often help the parish priest of Holy Family Mossend, Rev. Dean Cronin, by arranging the flowers that were always placed on the High Altar. Before she left for her train heading to France, she visited him. He gave her his blessing and told her to pick any book from his collection in the parish house. Closing her eyes, she chose ‘The life of St. Teresa of Avila.’ Only years later would she realize the significance of this moment as, like St. Teresa, she became a foundress in the Carmel Family.

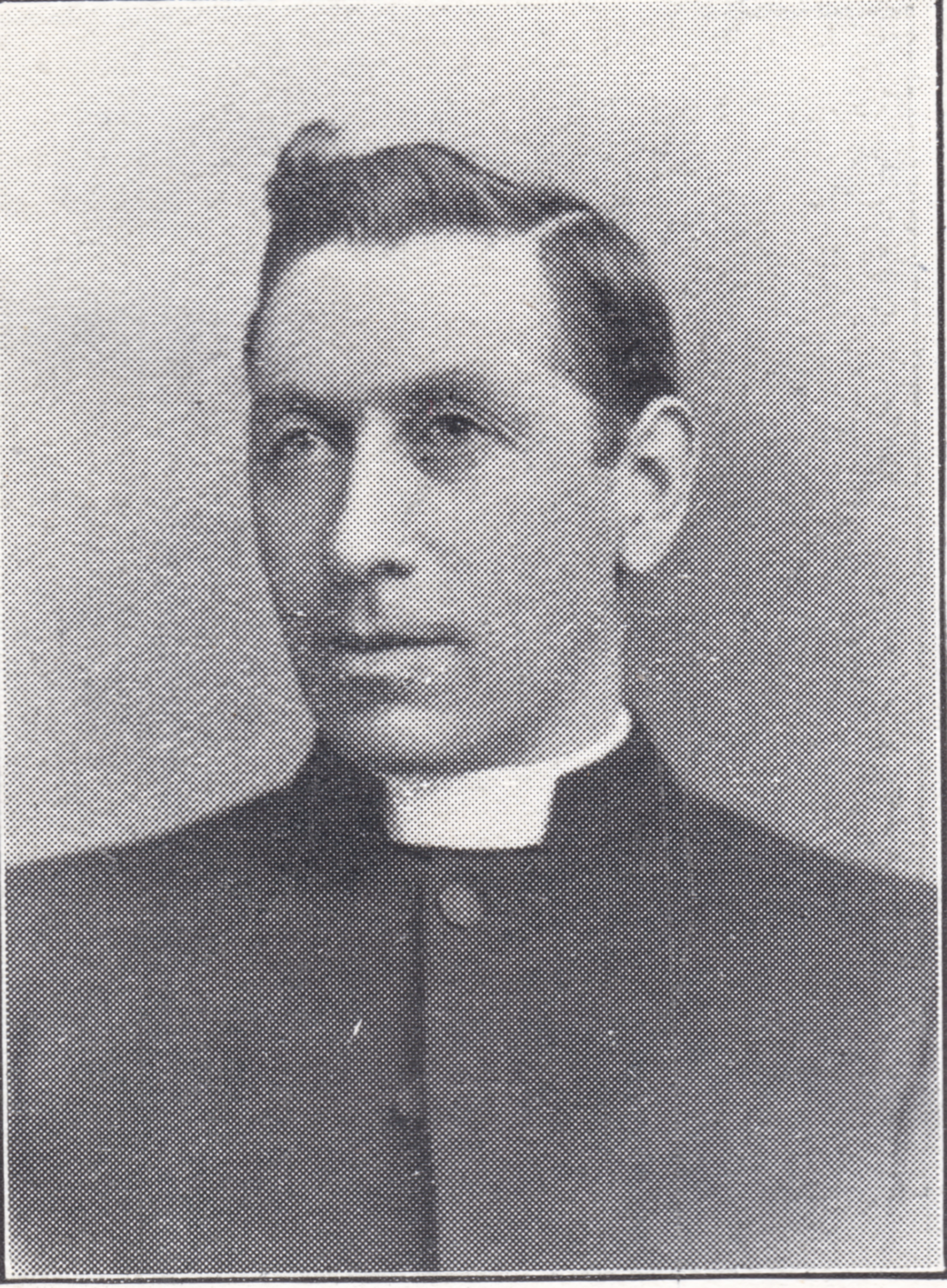
Rev. Fr. Dean Francis Cronin, Pastor of Holy Family, Mossend from 1907-1918.

== Vocation ==
In 1912, at the age of nineteen, after spending 12 years in Mossend, she left home to join the Little Sisters of the Poor, a Roman Catholic religious congregation engaged in the care of the destitute aged. She made her Novitiate in La Tour, France, where she took the religious name of Sister Angeline de St. Agatha. After her Profession, she was sent to the United States, arriving November 1, 1915.

In 1926, Mother Angeline was appointed Superior of a Home of the Little Sisters of the Poor in the Bronx, New York. During an annual retreat in 1927, she felt an urge to reach out to do more for the aged she cared for. She thought that the European way and many of France's customs did not meet the needs or customs of America. She felt that old age strikes all classes of people, leaving them alone and frightened. Unable to effect any necessary changes in her present situation, McCrory sought advice and counsel from Cardinal Patrick Hayes, the Archbishop of New York. The cardinal encouraged her in her work and suggested that she expand her ministry to include the aged throughout the New York City area. In 1929, to accomplish what she felt called to do, and with the blessing of Cardinal Hayes, McCrory and six other Sisters withdrew from the Little Sisters of the Poor and were granted permission from the Vatican to begin a new congregation for the care of the aged, incorporating Mother Angeline's ideals.

Although McCrory's formation from her original congregation was dedicated to the aged, she could now develop this service with new methods further. When established in 1929, The Carmelite Sisters for the Aged and Infirm was the first American Community of religious women founded solely to care for the aged. From the very start, the Carmelite friars in New York took a deep interest in assisting McCrory and her companions. The Commissary Provincial, the Very Reverend Dionysius Flanagan, OCarm, knew Mother Angeline as a Little Sister of the Poor when she was the superior of Our Lady's Home in the Bronx. In 1931 the new congregation became formally affiliated with the Carmelite Order and was henceforth known as the Carmelite Sisters for the Aged and Infirm.

== Later years ==
Due to declining health, McCrory stepped down as superior general in 1978. She is remembered as a kind and warm individual. She was fond of saying: "If you have to fail, let it be on the side of kindness. Be kinder than kindness itself to the elderly." According to Sister Kevin Patricia, prioress of the sisters in the Bronx, "Mother always felt that it was important to reach out and clasp the hand of an aged person. It was important to have that human touch, that kindness. She would stress that if she were here today." She received the Pro Ecclesiae Award, given by Pope John XXIII, and the Benemerenti Award, by Pope Paul VI.

== Death ==
McCrory died on January 21, 1984, her 91st birthday, at the St. Teresa Motherhouse at Avila-On Hudson in Germantown, New York, and interred in the congregation's cemetery.

== Beatification process ==
In 1989, her cause for Beatification and Canonization was introduced in the Diocese of Albany, with the approval of the Congregation for the Causes of Saints, and the case has been referred to Rome. The Diocesan Phase of the Cause was opened on 15 August 1992, and concluded on April 13, 2007.

On 28 June 2012, Pope Benedict XVI issued a decree formally acknowledging that McCrory had led a life of "heroic virtue".

In 2009, the Diocese of Metuchen investigated a reported miracle through the intercession of Mother McCrory. The alleged miracle involved a family in the Diocese of Metuchen who prayed to McCrory to intercede with God after their unborn child was diagnosed with a genetic abnormality. After the child was born, the defect was not present to the degree expected.

== Legacy ==
As of 2019, the Carmelite Sisters serve in 18 elder-care facilities around the country, plus one in Ireland.
