= Carmelite Sisters for the Aged and Infirm =

Religious institute based in the US

The Carmelite Sisters for the Aged and Infirm are a religious institute begun in 1929 by Mother Angeline Teresa (Bridget Teresa McCrory). The order is there to discern the differing needs of the aged, and to satisfy those needs to the best of their ability. At the Jubilee of Mother Angeline Teresa in 1964, she said that in the 1920s, while working among the aged in Brooklyn and Pittsburgh, she came to dislike the institutional flavor of existing homes, and sought to provide greater freedom for the residents.

== History ==
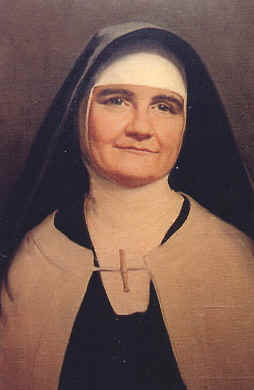
Mother Angeline МcCrory

The congregation of the Carmelite Sisters for the Aged and Infirm was founded in 1929. Sister Angeline de St. Agatha McCrory was Superior of a Home of the Little Sisters of the Poor in the Bronx, New York. She felt that the European way and many of the customs in France did not meet the needs or customs of America. She also believed that old age strikes all classes of people, leaving them alone and frightened. Being unable to effect any necessary changes in her present situation, McCrory sought advice and counsel from Patrick Cardinal Hayes, the Archbishop of New York. The cardinal encouraged her in her work and suggested that she expand her ministry to include the aged throughout the New York City area.

With the blessing of Cardinal Hayes, McCrory and six other Sisters withdrew from the Little Sisters of the Poor and were granted permission from the Vatican to begin a new congregation for the care of the aged, incorporating Mother Angeline's ideals.

Mother M. Angeline Teresa, O. Carm., died in 1984 at the age of 91. On 28 June 2012, Pope Benedict XVI issued a decree declaring McCrory Venerable.

== Innovations ==
Her concept of cares for the aged was a pioneering one. The homes operated by the order added rehabilitation maintenance and recreation to the basic custodial care provided by homes for the aged. The homes allowed aged couples to share a room, unlike many homes, and sought to provide the atmosphere of a middle class private home. The goal was the maintenance of their dignity. The religious sisters also operated day care for the elderly of the neighborhood.

== Present day ==
The motherhouse of the congregation is St. Teresa's at Avila-on-Hudson in Germantown, New York. At present, there are approximately 110 Carmelite Sisters for the Aged and Infirm who operate 18 homes caring for elderly persons.
