= Alokolum =

Locality in Omoro District, Uganda

- Location in Uganda
- Coordinates: 02°45′27″N 32°13′36″E
- Country: Uganda
- Region: Northern Region, Uganda
- Sub-region: Acholi sub-region
- District: Gulu City
- Elevation: 1,098 m (3,602 ft)
- Time zone: UTC+3 (EAT)

Alokolum is rural neighbourhood in Gulu City along Katikati-Alero Road in the Northern Region of Uganda. It is home to a seminary, Uganda Martyrs Major Seminary, Alokolum. The neighbourhood also hosts Archbishop Odama Nursery and Primary School and Bishop Angelo Negri Girls' Secondary School - Alokolum. Alokolum is the home to catholic church mission of Greyfriars - Conventual Franciscans.
