= Xaverian Missionary Sisters of Mary =

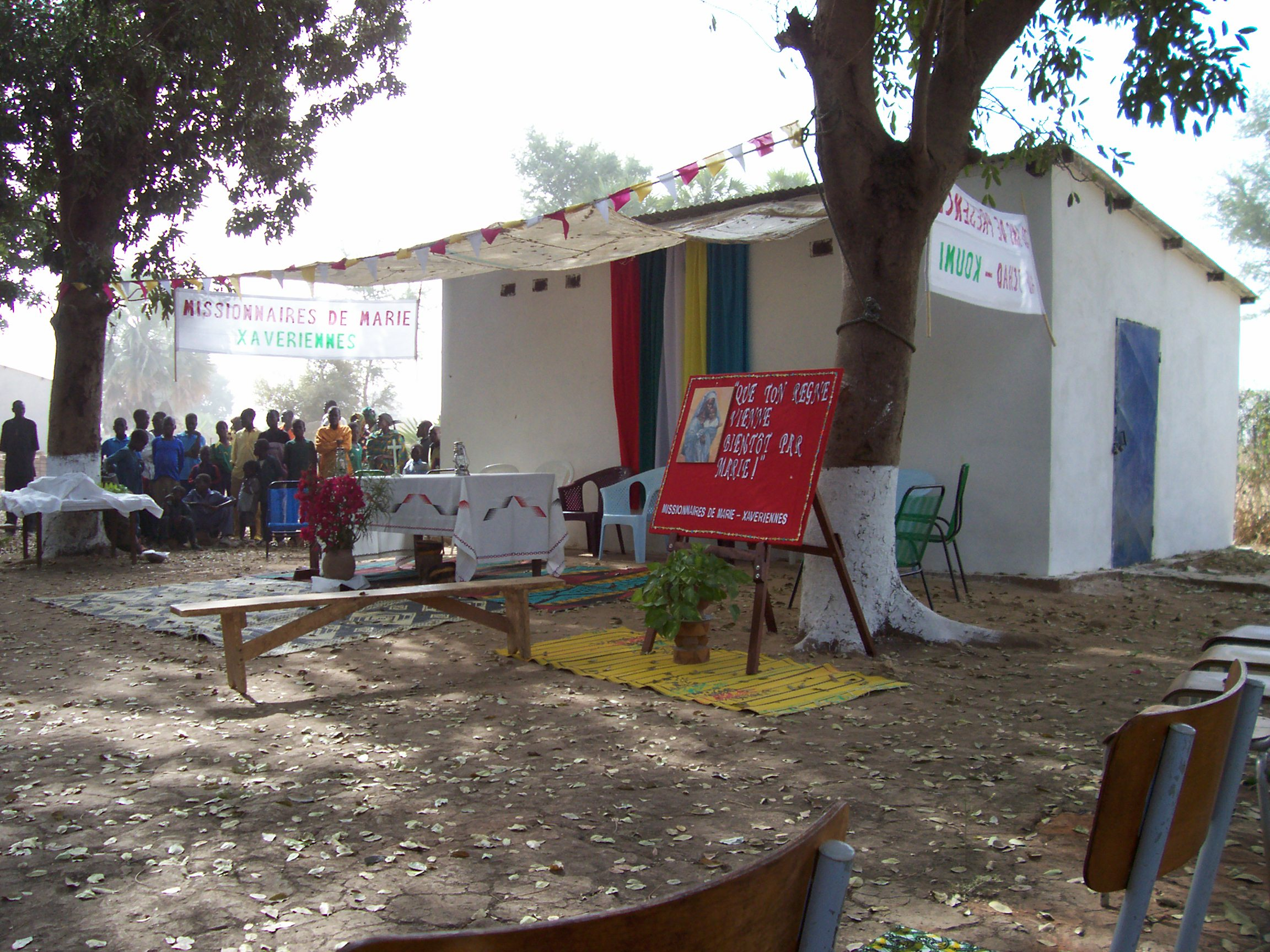
Festivity for 20 years activity in Koumi (Tchad, 2007)

The Xaverian Missionary Sisters of Mary or Missionary Society of Mary is a Roman Catholic religious institute. The members profess religious vows of poverty, chastity, and obedience, in order to dedicate the entire life to the Catholic missions, drawing inspiration from Mary in the mystery of the Visitation: like Mary they travel the world hopeful that everyone will come to know the love of God.

== History ==
The Xaverian Missionary Sisters of Mary began in Parma, Italy in 1945 on the initiative of Celestine Bottego (an Italian American born in Glendale, Ohio on 20 December 1895) and the Xaverian Missionary Father James Spagnolo. The Xaverian Missionaries, known also as the Pious Society of Saint Francis Xavier for Foreign Missions, founded in 1898 by Saint Guido Maria Conforti, then vicar general of Parma, has recognized the Sisters as the women's branch of their institute.

On the afternoon of September 7, 2014 Sisters Olga Raschietti, 83, and Lucia Pulici, 74, were killed inside their convent within a walled missionary compound in Burundi. In the early hours of the following morning Sr. Bernardetta Boggian (79) was also murdered. The murders remain unsolved.

== Works ==
The Xaverian Missionary Sisters engage in evangelization, catechetical activity, health care, and human promotion (especially of women). They live in small mission communities, often in areas of great poverty. They strive to respond to deep-rooted aspirations of the local churches and people among whom they live, sharing their life journey, sufferings, hopes and aspirations, including people in need of medical, agricultural, educational aid.

They no longer use a religious habit, and wear a simple dress in conformity with local customs.

== Organization ==
Today, the Missionaries of Mary – Xaverian Sisters – are present in United States, Italy, Brazil, Mexico, Sierra Leone, Cameroon, Chad, DR Congo, Japan and Thailand.

The 247 members live in 39 communities, and the superior general resides in Parma (Via Omero 4, 43123 Parma, Italy).

== See also ==
- Catholic missions
- Christianity and paganism
- Evangelism
- Mission (Christian)
- Missionary
- Proselytism
- Religious conversion
