= Apolonia Lizárraga =

Spanish religious sister, martyr and blessed (1867–1936)

Blessed Apolonia Lizárraga Martyr
- Born: 18 April 1867; Lezáun – Lezaun, Spain
- Died: 8 September 1936 (aged 69); Barcelona, Spain
- Venerated in: Roman Catholic Church
- Beatified: 28 October 2007, Saint Peter's Square, Vatican City by Pope Benedict XVI
- Feast: 6 November
- Attributes: Palm of martyrdom

Apolonia Lizárraga y Ochoa de Zabalegui also known by her religious name as Apolonia of the Blessed Sacrament (18 April 1867 – 8 September 1936) was a Spanish religious sister and superior general from the Carmelite Sisters of Charity. She was executed during the Spanish Civil War and beatified by Pope Benedict XVI in 2007.

== Biography ==
Lizárraga was born on 18 April 1867 in Lezáun – Lezaun, when was part of Yerri, Spain as the daughter of Cándido Lizárraga and Martina Ochoa de Zabalegui. She was baptised on 20 April and was the second of eight siblings, two of whom were also nuns.

She began her novitiate with the Carmelite Sisters of Charity on 16 July 1886 in Vitoria-Gasteiz, and over the following years was posted to schools in various parts of Spain, such as Trujillo, Villafranca de los Barros, Seville and vIC, where Lizárraga eventually became superior of the school community. Lizárraga adopted the religious name of Apolonia of the Blessed Sacrament. In 1917 Lizárraga became the right-hand woman of the Mother General, who entrusted her with visiting the communities in Extremadura, Andalusia, Chile and Argentina.

In 1925 Lizárraga was elected Superior General of the Carmelite Sisters of Charity, and one of her first priorities was to initiate the cause for the beatification and canonisation of the community’s founder, Joaquina de Vedruna, for which she was received by Pope Pius XI in Rome. There she opened a house for the community in 1930, strengthened the order’s presence in the Americas, particularly in Argentina, and established two schools, in León and Vigo. In 1931 Lizárraga was re-elected.

In the spring 1936, in the face of the threat faced by Catholic communities and figures during the Spanish anti-clerical red terror, Lizárraga wrote:

Everyone says that terrible things are expected and there is widespread panic; these are times of true persecution against God, and of course, we nuns are the first to suffer the consequences, so blessed be God who allows this to happen. He will give us strength

— Apolonia Lizárraga,

== Death ==
The outbreak of the Spanish Civil War caught her in Vic, Catalonia, and she was forced to leave her home two days later on 20 July to take refuge in her congregation’s Casa de la Misericordia, a building that was not assaulted. On 21 July, at that house, militiamen arrived and ordered all the nuns to leave, except for Lizárraga, who remained present during the search they carried out and in which they threatened to set fire to the convent. During the conflict, Lizárraga took it upon herself to shelter nuns, until she was expelled from the house a few days later.

On 2 August, Lizárraga moved to Barcelona at the request of her congregation and stayed at the house of a cousin, but soon had to move to the home of Nemesio Danver and another nun. A few days later, he met with Archbishop of Barcelona Manuel Irurita who was in hiding at the Tort family’s home; the family were at that time arranging the necessary paperwork for both of them to flee. Both Archbishop Irurita and the Tort family were later executed.

On the night of 6 September, some leftist militiamen turned up at the house and, following a search, Lizárraga was forced to admit that she was a nun, which compelled her to flee the house and return to her cousins’ home. On 8 September, she was arrested by members of the Workers' Party of Marxist Unification (POUM) along with the parish priest José Puig, who had also been hiding there, and one of his nieces. They were taken away to be questioned and subsequently led to the Tower of Death on Passeig de Sant Joan, together with Danver and another nun.

After the interrogation and having confessed that she was a nun of the Carmelites of Charity, she was taken out of the room, stripped and quartered alive, her flesh being thrown to the pigs that the torturers were fattening up in the checa of Saint Elias at the Parish of Saint Agnes. It is said that these pigs were later used to make chorizo sausages, which the militia dubbed "nun’s chorizo".

== Beatification ==
She was beatified in Saint Peter's Square on 28 October 2007 by Pope Benedict XVI along 497 Spanish martyrs.
