= 498 Spanish Martyrs =

Martyrs of the Spanish Civil War

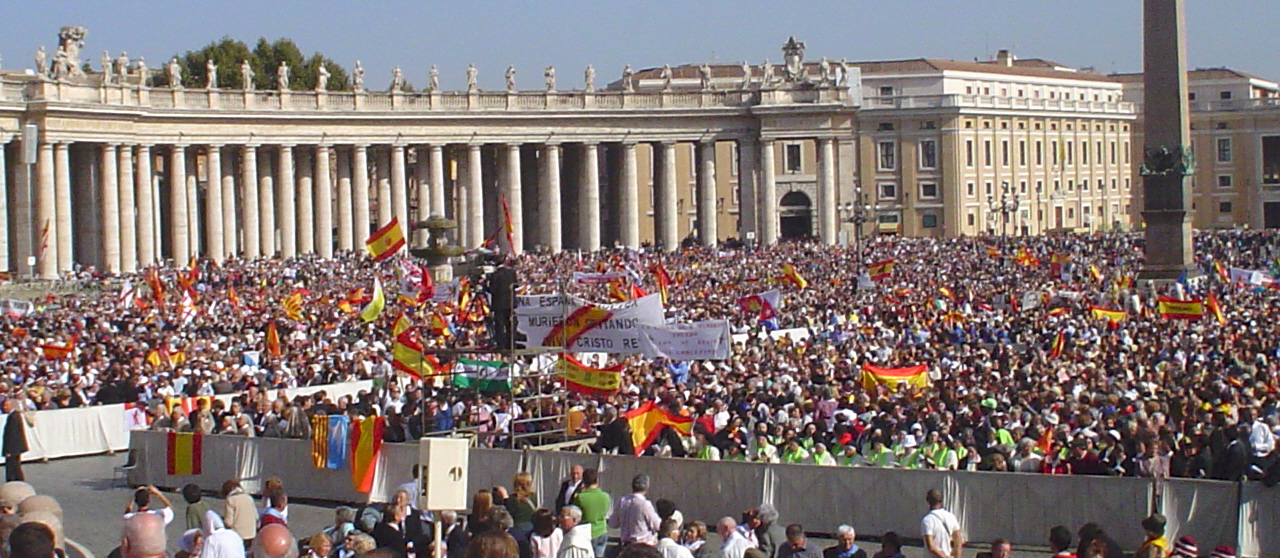
Piazza San Pietro

The 498 Spanish Martyrs are a group of murder victims in the Spanish Civil War who were beatified by the Catholic Church in October 2007 by Pope Benedict XVI. They originated from many parts of Spain. Their ages ranged from 16 years to 78 years old. Although almost 500 persons, they are only a small part of the Martyrs of the Spanish Civil War.

== Background ==
The Martyrs of the Spanish Civil War were clergy, religious and lay persons of the Roman Catholic church who were executed during the Spanish Civil War, in a period known as the Red Terror. It is estimated that in the course of the Red Terror 6,832 members of the Catholic clergy were killed. Some 2,000 of these have been proposed for canonization and have had their causes advanced to the Congregation for the Causes of Saints (CCS). Pope John Paul II was the first pope to beatify a large number of saints from the Spanish Civil War. About 500 Spanish martyrs were recognized by him in several beatifications since 1987. In this ceremony, Benedict XVI beatified 498 individuals, proposed in 23 separate causes, the largest group to be beatified so far. In addition to these, another 1000 martyrs are awaiting conclusion of their causes in the Vatican.

== Individual fates ==
The 498 martyrs include bishops, priests, male and female religious and faithful of both sexes. Three were 16 years old and the oldest was 78. They were from all parts of Spain, including the dioceses of Barcelona, Burgos, Madrid, Mérida, Oviedo, Seville, Toledo, Albacete, Cartagena, Ciudad Real, Cuenca, Gerona, Jaén, Málaga and Santander. Although Spain was the site of their martyrdom and the homeland of many of them, there were also some who came from other nations, from France, Mexico and Cuba. They are described as "men and women who were faithful to their obligations", and "who were able to forgive their killers". Cruz Laplana Laguna, the bishop of Cuenca, wrote I cannot go, only here is my responsibility, whatever may happen, while Fr. Tirso de Jesús María, a companion of Eusebio Fernandez Arenillas, wrote in the letter sent to his family on the eve of his execution: "Pardon them and bless them and amen to everything, just as I love them and pardon them and bless them".

== Beatification ceremony ==
The beatification of the 498 martyrs (list below) took place on Saint Peter's Square not in the Basilica itself, which can include only 60,000 persons. Cardinal José Saraiva Martins, who gave the sermon during the beatification ceremonies, stated that these Martyrs all loved Christ and the Church more than their own life and that the victims of terror forgave their killers, referring to Father Tirso as an example.

The logo of the beatification, because of the very large number of new Blesseds, had as its central theme a red cross, the symbol of love taken to the point of shedding blood for Christ.

Pope Benedict XVI stated that faith helps to purify reason so that it may succeed in perceiving the truth. The Cardinal invoked the intercession of the Martyrs beatified and of Mary, Queen of Martyrs, "so that we may follow their example".

== Spanish reactions ==
Juan Antonio Martínez Camino, the secretary-general of the Spanish bishops, replied to criticism that the martyrs were old fashioned conservatives: the first martyrs of the Church died after they were labeled as traitors of the Roman Empire, and during the French Revolution, Catholic priests were defined as enemies of the revolution. The Spanish victims were branded as an obstacle to historical progress.

The Spanish bishops stated that Spanish society is threatened by militant Secularism. The 498 Martyrs were thus a reminder of other values: "their beatification intends first of all to render glory to God for the faith which conquers the world". The bishops organized a national pilgrimage to Rome, the place of the beatification of the 498 Martyrs, and of the martyrdom of Saint Peter and Saint Paul.

== The 23 Causes ==
The 498 Martyrs were proposed in 23 separate causes; the Vatican lists them as:

- Lucas de San José Tristany Pujol, of the Discalced Brothers of the Virgin Mary of Mount Carmel;
- Leonardo José Aragonés Mateu, a religious of the Institute of the Brothers of the Christian Schools (the De La Salle brothers);
- Apolonia Lizárraga del Santísimo Sacramento, who was Superior of the Carmelites of Charity, with 61 brothers and sisters of the same orders;
- Bernardo Fábrega Julià, a Marist Brother;
- Víctor Chumillas Fernández, Priest of the order of Little Brothers and 21 members of the same order;
- Antero Mateo García, a lay person was head of family and third order of Saint Dominic. He was slain with 11 others from the second and third order of Saint Dominic;
- Cruz Laplana y Laguna, the Bishop of Cuenca;
- Fernando Españo Berdié, a Priest;
- Narciso de Esténaga Echevarría, Bishop of Ciudad Real, and ten companions;
- Liberio González Nombela, priest and twelve companions, all clerics of the Archdiocese of Toledo;
- Eusebio del Niño Jesús Fernández Arenillas, a religious priest of the Discalced Carmelites, and 15 companions;
- Félix Echevarría Gorostiaga, Priest, and six companions of his order;
- Teodosio Rafael, a priest of the Congregation of Christian Brothers and three companions from the same order;
- Buenaventura García Paredes, a priest and Religious; Miguel Léibar Garay, Priest of the Company of Mary, and forty members of that order;
- Simón Reynés Solivellas and 5 companions, from the missionaries of the Sacred Heart of Jesus and Mary and from the congregation of Franciscan sisters;
- Celestino José Alonso Villar and 9 companions of his order;
- Ángel María Prat Hostench and 16 companions of the Carmelite order;
- Enrique Sáiz Aparicio and 62 companions of his Salesian order;
- Mariano de San José Altolaguirre y Altolaguirre and 9 companions of the order of the Most Holy Trinity;
- Eufrasio del Niño Jesús Barredo Fernández, Priest of the Carmelite order;
- Laurentino Alonso Fuente, Virgilio Lacunza Unzu and 44 companions of the Institute of Marist Brothers;
- Enrique Izquierdo Palacios, Priest and 13 companions of the order of Hermanos Predicadores;
- Ovidio Bertrán Anucibay Letona and 5 companions from the Institute of Christian Brothers;
- José María Cánovas Martínez, a diocesan priest;
- María del Carmen and Rosa y Magdalena Fradera Ferragutcasas, Sisters of the Congregation Hijas del Santísimo e Inmaculado Corazón de María;
- Avelino Rodríguez Alonso, Priest, order of the Order of Saint Augustine and 97 companions from the same order, together with Six Diocesan priests;
- Manuela del Corazón de Jesús Arriola Uranga and 22 companions of the congregation Siervas Adoratrices del Santísimo Sacramento y de la Caridad.

== The 498 Martyrs ==
=== Bishops ===
1. Cruz Laplana y Laguna, Bishop of Cuenca (3 May 1875 – 8 August 1936)
2. Narciso de Estenaga Echevarría, Bishop of Ciudad Real (29 October 1882 – 22 August 1936)

=== Diocesan Clergy ===
1. Agrícola Rodríguez García de los Huertos (18 March 1896 – 21 July 1936)
2. Joaquín de la Madrid Arespacochaga (6 November 1860 – 27 July 1936)
3. Vicente Toledano Valenciano (28 October 1900 – 28 July 1936)
4. Bartolomé Rodríguez Soria (7 September 1894 – 29 July 1936)
5. Ricardo Pla Espí (12 December 1898 – 30 July 1936)
6. Justino Alarcón Vera (1 August 1885 – 1 August 1936)
7. Saturnino Ortega Montealegre (29 November 1866 – 6 August 1936)
8. Fernando Español Berdie (11 October 1875 – 8 August 1936)
9. Francisco López-Gasco Fernández-Largo (4 October 1888 – 9 August 1936)
10. Domingo Sánchez Lázaro (4 August 1860 – 12 August 1936)
11. Liberio González Nombela (30 December 1895 – 18 August 1936)
12. Justo Arévalo Mora (19 June 1869 – 19 August 1936)
13. Pedro Buitrago Morales (24 January 1883 – 19 August 1936)
14. Félix González Bustos (23 February 1903 – 19 August 1936)
15. Julio Melgar Salgado (16 April 1900 – 22 August 1936)
16. José Polo Benito (27 January 1879 – 23 August 1936)
17. Rigoberto Aquilino de Anta Barrio (4 January 1894 – 24 August 1936)
18. Enrique Vidaurreta Palma (16 October 1896 – 31 August 1936)
19. Miguel Beato Sánchez (30 April 1911 – 8 September 1936)
20. Mamerto Carchano y Carchano (21 July 1879 – 8 September 1936)
21. Fortunato Arias Sánchez (11 June 1892 – 12 September 1936)
22. Miguel Díaz Sánchez (30 July 1879 – 15 November 1936)
23. José María Cánovas Martínez (9 August 1894 – 18 November 1936)

=== Deacons ===
1. Juan Duarte Martín (17 March 1912 – 5 November 1936)

=== Seminarians ===
1. Francisco Maqueda López (10 October 1914 – 12 September 1936)
2. Josep Casas Ros (26 August 1916 – 28 September 1936)

=== Roman Catholic Laity ===
1. Prudència Canyelles Ginestà de Aguadé (5 August 1884 – 23 July 1936)
2. Álvaro Santos Cejudo Moreno Chocano (19 February 1880 – 17 September 1936)

=== Marist Brothers of the Schools (Marists) ===
1. Plàcid (Bernat) Fàbrega Julià (18 February 1889 – 6 October 1934)
2. Mariano (Laurentino) Alonso Fuente (21 November 1881 – 8 October 1936)
3. Néstor (Alberto María) Vivar Valdivieso (4 March 1910 – 8 October 1936)
4. Anicet (Anselm) Falgueras Casellas (16 June 1879 – 8 October 1936)
5. Antoni (Antolí) Roig Alembau (6 February 1891 – 8 October 1936)
6. Pedro (Baudilio) Ciordia Hernández (19 May 1888 – 8 October 1936)
7. Casimir (Bernabé) Riba Pi (14 September 1877 – 8 October 1936)
8. Carles (Carles Rafael) Brengaret Pujol (11 July 1917 – 8 October 1936)
9. Josep (Dionís Martí) Cesari Mercadal (16 January 1903 – 8 October 1936)
10. Ferran (Epifani) Suñer Estrach (26 March 1874 – 8 October 1936)
11. Fermín (Felipe José) Latienda Azpilicueta (7 July 1891 – 8 October 1936)
12. Félix (Félix León) Ayúcar Eraso (4 December 1911 – 8 October 1936)
13. Fortunato (Fortunato Andrés) Ruiz Peña (2 February 1898 – 8 October 1936)
14. Julio (Frumencio) García Galarza (28 June 1909 – 8 October 1936)
15. Segismundo (Gabriel Eduardo) Hidalgo Martínez (28 April 1913 – 8 October 1936)
16. Joan (Gaudenci) Tubau Perelló (10 March 1894 – 8 October 1936)
17. Felipe (Gil Felipe) Ruiz Peña (23 March 1907 – 8 October 1936)
18. Antoni (Hermògenes) Badía Andale (13 April 1908 – 8 October 1936)
19. Victoriano (Isaías María) Martínez Martín (1 March 1899 – 8 October 1936)
20. Nicolás (Ismael) Ran Goñi (6 December 1909 – 8 October 1936)
21. Jaume (Jaume Ramon) Morella Bruguera (25 November 1898 – 8 October 1936)
22. Gregorio (José Carmelo) Faci Molins (2 March 1908 – 8 October 1936)
23. Nicolás (José Federico) Pereda Revuelta (20 February 1916 – 8 October 1936)
24. Joan (Joan Crisòstom) Pelfort Planell (21 May 1913 – 8 October 1936)
25. Jesús (Juan De Mata) Menchón Franco (15 June 1898 – 8 October 1936)
26. Pere (Laureà Carles) Sitges Puig (4 May 1889 – 8 October 1936)
27. Jeroni (Leònides) Messegué Ribera (27 January 1884 – 8 October 1936)
28. Florentino (Leopoldo José) Redondo Insausti (14 March 1885 – 8 October 1936)
29. Victor (Lino Fernando) Gutiérrez Gómez (23 December 1899 – 8 October 1936)
30. Ángel (Licarión) Roba Osorno (27 January 1895 – 8 October 1936)
31. Isidro (Martiniano) Serrano Fabón (5 August 1901 – 8 October 1936)
32. Leocadio (Miguel Ireneo) Rodríguez Nieto (9 December 1899 – 8 October 1936)
33. Leoncio (Porfirio) Pérez Gómez (6 July 1899 – 8 October 1936)
34. Josep (Priscillià) Mir Pons (1 February 1889 – 8 October 1936)
35. Feliciano (Ramón Alberto) Ayúcar Eraso (24 January 1914 – 8 October 1936)
36. Victoriano (Salvio) Gómez Gutiérrez (8 November 1884 – 8 October 1936)
37. Serafín (Santiago) Zugaldía Lacruz (16 April 1894 – 8 October 1936)
38. Santiago (Santiago María) Saiz Martínez (30 December 1912 – 8 October 1936)
39. Santos (Santos) Escudero Miguel (30 October 1907 – 8 October 1936)
40. Lucio (Teódulo) Zudaire Armendía (23 April 1890 – 8 October 1936)
41. Josep (Víctor Conrad) Ambrós Dejuán (26 March 1898 – 8 October 1936)
42. José Miguel (Vito José) Elola Arruti (5 March 1893 – 8 October 1936)
43. Juan (Vivencio) Núñez Casado (10 January 1908 – 8 October 1936)
44. Ramon (Wulfran) Mill Arán (3 March 1909 – 8 October 1936)
45. Trifón (Virgilio) Lacunza Unzu (3 July 1891 – 8 October 1936)
46. Lucio (Ángel Andrés) Izquierdo López (4 March 1899 – 8 October 1936)
47. Josep (Victorí Josep) Blanch Roca (23 February 1908 – 8 October 1936)

=== Order of Preachers (Dominicans) ===
1. Abraham (Luis) Furones y Furones [Arenas] (8 October 1892 – 20 July 1936)
2. Jacinto García Riesco (28 August 1894 – 20 July 1936)
3. José López Tascón (3 March 1896 – 25 July 1936)
4. José Luis Palacio Muñiz (20 May 1870 – 25 July 1936)
5. Antonio Varona Ortega (16 January 1901 – 25 July 1936)
6. Higinio Roldán Iriberri (11 January 1895 – 25 July 1936)
7. Juan Crespo Calleja (27 December 1895 – 25 July 1936)
8. Manuel Moreno Martínez (17 June 1862 – 5 August 1936)
9. Maximino Fernández Marinas (2 November 1867 – 5 August 1936)
10. Victor García Ceballos (24 June 1880 – 5 August 1936)
11. Eduardo González Santo Domingo (5 January 1889 – 5 August 1936)
12. Buenaventura García-Paredes Pallasá, 78th Master of the Order of Preachers (19 April 1866 – 12 August 1936)
13. Inocencio García Díez (28 December 1875 – 13 August 1936)
14. Luciano (Reginaldo) Hernández Ramírez (7 January 1909 – 13 August 1936)
15. Josep Santonja Pinsach (1 April 1879 – 15 August 1936)
16. Celestino José Alonso Villar (15 June 1862 – 18 August 1936)
17. Santiago Franco Mayo (28 March 1905 – 18 August 1936)
18. Gregorio Díez Pérez (9 May 1910 – 18 August 1936)
19. Abilio Sáiz López (2 February 1894 – 18 August 1936)
20. Vicente Álvarez Cienfuegos (29 April 1863 – 25 August 1936)
21. Pedro Ibáñez Alonso (27 April 1892 – 27 August 1936)
22. José María López Carrillo (14 February 1892 – 27 August 1936)
23. Nicasio Romo Rubio (14 December 1891 – 30 August 1936)
24. Miguel Menéndez García (29 June 1885 – 31 August 1936)
25. José María Palacio Montes (9 November 1901 – 31 August 1936)
26. Isidro Ordóñez Díez (15 May 1909 – 31 August 1936)
27. José María Laguía Puerto (12 March 1888 – 2 September 1936)
28. Leoncio Arce Urrutia (12 January 1899 – 10 September 1936)
29. Manuel Alvarez Y Alvarez (16 March 1871 – 13 September 1936)
30. Teófilo Montes Calvo (2 October 1912 – 13 September 1936)
31. Cristobal Iturriaga-Echevarría Irazola (11 July 1915 – 20 September 1936)
32. Santiago (Pedro) Vega Ponce (25 July 1902 – 20 September 1936)
33. José Gafo Muñiz (20 October 1881 – 4 October 1936)
34. Eugenio Andrés Amo (6 September 1862 – 5 October 1936)
35. Cipriano Alguacil Torredenaida (12 October 1884 – 15 October 1936)
36. Jesús Villaverde Andrés (4 December 1877 – 16 October 1936)
37. Estanislao García Obeso (19 September 1875 – 22 October 1936)
38. Germán Caballero Atienza (11 October 1880 – 22 October 1936)
39. José Menéndez García (19 February 1888 – 22 October 1936)
40. Victoriano Ibañez Alonso (2 November 1864 – 22 October 1936)
41. Isabelino Carmona Fernández (16 September 1908 – 7 November 1936)
42. Alfredo Fanjul Acebal (16 July 1867 – 7 November 1936)
43. Juan Mendibelzúa Ocerín (23 November 1878 – 7 November 1936)
44. Vicente Rodríguez Fernández (22 October 1897 – 7 November 1936)
45. José Delgado Pérez (18 March 1917 – 7 November 1936)
46. Vidal Luis Gómara (3 November 1891 – 18 November 1936)
47. Félix Alonso Muñiz (2 May 1896 – 24 November 1936)
48. Juan Herrero Arroyo (24 May 1859 – 28 November 1936)
49. José Prieto Fuentes (14 May 1913 – 28 November 1936)
50. Amado Cubeñas Díaz-Madrazo (12 September 1880 – 30 November 1936)
51. Juan Peña Ruiz (Vicente) (22 March 1883 – 30 November 1936)
52. Manuel Santiago y Santiago (6 October 1916 – 3 December 1936)
53. Francisco Fernández Escosura (23 January 1917 – 3 December 1936)
54. Enrique Izquierdo Palacios (17 February 1890 – 23 December 1936)
55. Enrique Cañal Gómez (20 March 1869 – 23 December 1936)
56. Manuel Gutiérrez Ceballos (9 September 1876 – 23 December 1936)
57. Eliseo Miguel Lagro (28 August 1889 – 23 December 1936)
58. Miguel Rodríguez González (10 June 1892 – 23 December 1936)
59. Bernardino Irurzun Otermín (19 May 1903 – 23 December 1936)
60. Eleuterio Marne Mansilla (20 February 1909 – 23 December 1936)
61. Pedro Luís y Luís (9 December 1914 – 23 December 1936)
62. José María García Tabar (10 December 1918 – 23 December 1936)

=== Third Order of Saint Dominic (Lay Dominicans) ===
1. Antero Mateo García (4 March 1875 – 8 August 1936)
2. Miquel Peiro Victori (7 February 1887 – 25 July 1936)

=== Dominican Nuns ===
1. Ventureta (Josefina) Sauleda Paulís (30 July 1885 – 31 August 1936)

=== Dominican Sisters of Education of the Immaculata ===
1. María Del Carmen Zaragoza y Zaragoza (1 June 1888 – 7 August 1936)
2. María Rosa Adrover Martí (22 July 1888 – 7 August 1936)

=== Dominican Sisters of the Anunciata ===
1. Ramona Fossas Románs (11 November 1881 – 27 July 1936)
2. Adelfa Soro Bó (6 March 1887 – 27 July 1936)
3. Teresa Prats Martí (8 January 1896 – 27 July 1936)
4. Otilia Alonso González (31 December 1916 – 27 July 1936)
5. Ramona Perramón Vila (2 August 1898 – 27 July 1936)
6. Reginalda Picas Planas (25 May 1895 – 27 July 1936)
7. Rosa Jutglar Gallart (25 January 1900 – 27 July 1936)

=== Society of Mary (Marianists) ===
1. Miguel Léibar Garay (17 February 1885 – 28 July 1936)
2. Florencio Arnáiz Cejudo (10 May 1909 – 13 September 1936)
3. Joaquín Ochoa Salazar (16 April 1910 – 13 September 1936)
4. Sabino Ayastuy Errasti (29 December 1911 – 13 September 1936)

=== Order of the Most Holy Trinity (Trinitarians) ===
1. Santiago Altolaguirre y Altolaguirre (Mariano of Saint Joseph) (30 December 1857 – 26 July 1936)
2. Prudencio Guerequiz Guezuraga (Prudencio of the Cross) (28 April 1883 – 31 July 1936)
3. Segundo García Cabezas (Segundo of Saint Teresa) (24 March 1891 – 31 July 1936)
4. José Vicente Hormaechea Apoita (José of Jesus Mary) (1 September 1880 – 4 September 1936)
5. Luis De Erdoiza Zamalloa (Luis of Saint Michael of the Saints) (25 August 1891 – 24 September 1936)
6. Melchor Rodríguez Villastrigo (Melchor of the Holy Spirit) (28 January 1899 – 24 September 1936)
7. Santiago Arriaga Arrien (Santiago of Jesus) (22 November 1903 – 24 September 1936)
8. Juan Francisco Joya Corralero (Juan of the Virgin of Castellar) (16 May 1898 – 24 September 1936)
9. María Francisca Espejo Martos (Francisca of the Incarnation) (2 February 1873 – 13 January 1937)
10. Juan Otazua Madariaga (Juan of Jesus and Mary) (8 February 1895 – 3 April 1937)

=== Brothers of the Christian Schools (De La Salle Brothers) ===
1. Marcos Morón Casas (Indalecio de María) (25 April 1899 – 24 July 1936)
2. Josep (Josep Benet) Más Pujolrás (13 August 1913 – 25 July 1936)
3. Santos (Mariano Leon) López Martinez (16 October 1910 – 25 July 1936)
4. Vicente (Vicente Justino) Fernández Castrillo (31 August 1912 – 25 July 1936)
5. Jesús (Arnoldo Julian) Juan Otero (6 June 1902 – 25 July 1936)
6. Josep (Benet Josep) Bardolet Compte (20 July 1903 – 25 July 1936)
7. Antoni Jaume (Jaume Berti) Secases (19 November 1905 – 26 July 1936)
8. Francesc (Honest Maria) Pujol Espinalt (9 April 1894 – 27 July 1936)
9. Narcis (Ramon Eloi) Serra Rovira (1 May 1876 – 27 July 1936)
10. Antoni (Francesc Magi) Tost Llaberia (17 January 1915 – 27 July 1936)
11. Joseph-Louis (Louis de Jesus) Marcou Pecalvel (19 August 1881 – 29 July 1936)
12. Ramón (Cayetano José) Palos Gascón (11 August 1885 – 30 July 1936)
13. Martí (Victori) Anglés Oliveras (1 October 1887 – 2 August 1936)
14. Pere (Edmond Ángel) Massó Llagostera (20 April 1897 – 5 August 1936)
15. Antoni (Adolf Jaume) Serra Hortal (19 December 1880 – 6 August 1936)
16. Diodoro (Teodosio Rafael) López Hernando (27 September 1898 – 7 August 1936)
17. Luis (Eustaquio Luis) Villanueva Montoya (10 September 1888 – 7 August 1936)
18. Dalmacio (Carlos Jorge) Bellota Pérez (22 November 1908 – 7 August 1936)
19. Pedro (Felipe José) Álvarez Pérez (27 June 1914 – 8 August 1936)
20. Josep Maria (Lleonard Josep) Aragones Mateu (21 May 1886 – 9 August 1936)
21. Mateo (Dionisio Luis) Molinos Coloma (21 August 1890 – 9 August 1936)
22. Josep (Llorenç Gabriel) Figuera Rey (22 August 1912 – 9 August 1936)
23. Eugenio (Hilarion Eugenio) Cuesta Padierna (2 March 1912 – 13 August 1936)
24. Francisco (Francisco Alfredo) Mallo Sánchez (16 August 1916 – 13 August 1936)
25. Eudald (Oleguer Àngel) Rodas Saurina (1 August 1912 – 18 August 1936)
26. Agustín (Honorato Alfredo) Pedro Calvo (8 September 1913 – 18 August 1936)
27. Joseph (Jacob Samuel) Chamayoux Auclés (21 April 1884 – 18 August 1936)
28. Remigio (Agapito León) Ángel Olalla Aldea (2 August 1903 – 19 August 1936)
29. Urbano (Josafat Roque) Corral González (6 December 1899 – 19 August 1936)
30. Valeriano (Julio Alfonso) Ruiz Peral (15 September 1911 – 19 August 1936)
31. Antolín (Dámaso Luis) Martínez y Martínez (12 January 1915 – 19 August 1936)
32. Isidro (Ladislao Luis) Muñoz Antolín (8 May 1916 – 19 August 1936)
33. Ismael (Celestino Antonio) Barrio Marquilla (22 April 1911 – 20 August 1936)
34. Vicente (Eliseo Vicente) Alberich Lluch (29 January 1906 – 23 August 1936)
35. Nicolás (Valeriano Luis) Alberich Lluch (1 January 1898 – 23 August 1936)
36. Salvi (Onofre) Tolosa Alsina (31 January 1880 – 25 August 1936)
37. Baldomer (Esiqui Josep) Margenat Puigmitja (4 July 1897 – 2 September 1936)
38. Félix (Benito Clemente) España Ortiz (1 February 1889 – 10 September 1936)
39. Josep (Emeri Josep) Plana Rebugent (16 September 1900 – 12 September 1936)
40. Julián (Hugo Julián) Delgado Díez (9 January 1905 – 12 September 1936)
41. Jaume (Miquel de Jesus) Puigferrer Mora (12 July 1898 – 12 September 1936)
42. Mariano (Adolfo Mariano) Anel Andreu (16 June 1910 – c. October 1936)
43. Ruperto (Florencio Miguel) García Arce ( 10 July 1908 – 13 October 1936)
44. Josep (Ildefons Lluís) Casas Lluch (20 June 1886 – 22 October 1936)
45. José (Crisóstomo) Llorach Bretó (9 February 1881 – 3 November 1936)
46. José (Candido Alberto) Ruiz de la Torre (26 March 1906 – 3 November 1936)
47. Francisco (Leonides) Colom González (12 July 1887 – 3 November 1936)
48. Cecilio (Cirilo Pedro) Manrique Arnáiz (1 February 1909 – 3 November 1936)
49. Eusebio (Eusebio Andrés) Roldán Vielva (15 December 1895 – 17 November 1936)
50. Esteban (Ovidio Bertrán) Anuncibay Letona (26 December 1892 – 18 November 1936)
51. Modesto (Hermenegildo Lorenzo) Sáez Manzanares (30 July 1903 – 18 November 1936)
52. Germán (Luciano Pablo) García y García (28 May 1903 – 18 November 1936)
53. Augusto (Estanislao Víctor) Cordero Fernández (7 October 1908 – 18 November 1936)
54. Emiliano (Lorenzo Santiago) Martínez de la Pera Álava (8 August 1913 – 18 November 1936)
55. Francisco (Leon Justino) Del Valle Villar (25 May 1906 – 2 December 1936)
56. Josep Lluís (Agapi) Carrera Comas (4 February 1881 – 9 December 1936)
57. Jaume (Lambert Carles) Mases Boncompte (14 April 1894 – 16 December 1936)
58. Josep (Feliu Josep) Trilla Lastra (14 September 1908 – 19 March 1937)

=== Sisters Adorers, Handmaids of Charity and of the Blessed Sacrament ===
1. Manuela (of the Sacred Heart) Arriola Uranda (29 December 1891 – 10 November 1936)
2. Juana Francisca Pérez de Labeaga García (Blasa of Mary) (27 January 1864 – 10 November 1936)
3. Lucía González García (Lucila María of Jesus) (2 March 1908 – 10 November 1936)
4. Teresa Vives Missé (Casta of Jesus) (20 April 1866 – 10 November 1936)
5. Rosa López Brochier (Rosaura of Mary) (29 May 1876 – 10 November 1936)
6. Luisa (of the Eucharist)Pérez Adriá (7 March 1897 – 10 November 1936)
7. María (of the Presentation) García Ferreiro (9 November 1896 – 10 November 1936)
8. María Dolores (of Jesus Crucified) Monzón Rosales (8 January 1907 – 10 November 1936)
9. María Dolores (of the Holy Trinity) Hernández Santorcuato (7 April 1911 – 10 November 1936)
10. María Cenona Aranzábal de Barrutia (Borja of Jesus) (9 July 1878 – 10 November 1936)
11. Emilia Echevarría Fernández (Máxima of Saint Joseph) (5 April 1881 – 10 November 1936)
12. Dionisia Rodríguez de Anta (Sulpicia of the Good Shepherd) (14 November 1890 – 10 November 1936)
13. María Prima (of Jesus) de Ipiña Malzárraga (9 June 1898 – 10 November 1936)
14. Belarmina (of Jesus) Pérez Martínez (26 September 1899 – 10 November 1936)
15. Sinforosa (of the Holy Family) Díaz Fernández (23 March 1892 – 10 November 1936)
16. Purificación (of Mary) Martínez Vera (15 June 1910 – 10 November 1936)
17. Josepa (of Jesus) Boix Rieras (22 February 1893 – 10 November 1936)
18. Maria Mercè (Àngels) Tuñi Ustech (17 June 1888 – 10 November 1936)
19. Concepción (Ruperta) Vázquez Areas (c. 1871 – 10 November 1936)
20. Aurea (Herlinda) González Fernández (c. 1904 – 10 November 1936)
21. Cecilia Iglesias Del Campo (unknown – 10 November 1936)
22. Magdalena Pérez (unknown – 10 November 1936)
23. Felipa Gutierrez Garay (C. 1861 – 10 November 1936)

=== Order of the Discalced Brothers of the Blessed Virgin Mary of Mount Carmel (Discalced Carmelites) ===
1. Eufrasio (of the Child Jesus) Barredo Fernández (8 February 1897 – 12 October 1934)
2. Josep Tristany Pujol (Lluc of Saint Joseph) (14 December 1872 – 20 July 1936)
3. Antoni Bosch Verdura (Jordi of Saint Joseph) (6 September 1889 – 20 July 1936)
4. Joan (Joan Josep of Jesus Crucified) Páfila Monllaó (19 August 1911 – 20 July 1936)
5. Ovidio Fernández Arenillas (Eusebio of the Child Jesus) (21 February 1888 – 22 July 1936)
6. Clemente (of the Sacred Hearts) López Yagüe (25 November 1911 – 22 July 1936)
7. Pedro Ramón Rodríguez (Hermilo of Saint Eliseus) (14 April 1913 – 22 July 1936)
8. Esteban Cuevas Casquero (Eliseo of Jesus Crucified) (26 December 1913 – 22 July 1936)
9. Perfecto (of the Virgin of Carmel) Domínguez Monge (18 April 1914 – 22 July 1936)
10. Tomás Mateos Sánchez (José Agustin of the Blessed Sacrament) (17 September 1912 – 22 July 1936)
11. Jaime (of Saint Teresa) Gascón Bordas (25 July 1886 – 24 July 1936)
12. Josep Guillamí Rodo (Romuald of Saint Catherine) (3 February 1866 – 24 July 1936)
13. Ricard Farré Masip (Eduard of the Child Jesus) (3 April 1897 – 25 July 1936)
14. Jaume Balcells Grau (Gabriel of the Annunciation) (12 October 1908 – 25 July 1936)
15. Vicente Álamo Jiménez (Jose María of the Sorrowful Mother) (3 August 1901 – 30 July 1936)
16. José Mata Luis (Constancio of Saint Joseph) (23 August 1914 – 30 July 1936)
17. Nazario (of the Sacred Heart) Del Valle González (28 July 1901 – 31 July 1936)
18. Pedro Jiménez Vallejo (Pedro José of the Sacred Hearts) (22 February 1861 – 31 July 1936)
19. José Grijalvo Medel (Ramón of the Virgin of Carmel) (29 March 1896 – 31 July 1936)
20. Daniel (of the Passion) Mora Nine (17 February 1908 – 31 July 1936)
21. Luis Gómez De Pablo (Félix of the Virgin of Carmel) (9 January 1912 – 31 July 1936)
22. José Luis Collado Oliver (Placido of the Child Jesus) (25 January 1912 – 31 July 1936)
23. Melchor (of the Child Jesus) Martín Monge (18 July 1914 – 31 July 1936)
24. Josep Maria Masip Tamarit (Marçal of Saint Anne) (2 March 1914 – c. September 1936)
25. Gregorio Sánchez Sancho (Tirso of Jesus Mary) (19 April 1899 – 7 September 1936)
26. Antoni (Antoni Maria Of Jesus) Bonet Sero (20 March 1907 – 7 September 1936)
27. Josep Casas Juliá (Joaquim Of Saint Joseph) (23 December 1915 – 10 October 1936)
28. Pedro de Alcantara de Forton de Cascajares (Pedro Tomás of the Virgin of the Pillar) (26 April 1888 – 10 October 1936)
29. Luis Minguel Ferrer (Luis María of the Virgin of Mercy) (13 June 1902 – 22 October 1936)
30. Alfons Arimany Ferrer (Alfons of the Heart of Mary) (19 May 1905 – 25 October 1936)
31. Mariano Alarcón Ruiz (José Mariano of the Angels) (24 November 1912 – 17 December 1936)

=== Order of Friars Minor (Franciscans) ===
1. Victor Chumillas Fernández (28 July 1902 – 16 August 1936)
2. Ángel Hernández-Ranera de Diego (1 October 1887 – 16 August 1936)
3. Domingo Alonso de Frutos (12 May 1900 – 16 August 1936)
4. Martín Lozano Tello (19 September 1900 – 16 August 1936)
5. Julian Navio Colado (12 August 1904 – 16 August 1936)
6. Benigno Prieto del Pozo (25 November 1906 – 16 August 1936)
7. Marcelino Ovejero Gómez (13 February 1913 – 16 August 1936)
8. José De Vega Pedraza (30 August 1913 – 16 August 1936)
9. José Alvarez Rodríguez (14 October 1913 – 16 August 1936)
10. Andrés Majadas Málaga (2 March 1914 – 16 August 1936)
11. Santiago Maté Calzada (25 July 1914 – 16 August 1936)
12. Alfonso Sánchez Hernández-Ranera (26 January 1915 – 16 August 1936)
13. Anastasio González Rodríguez (11 October 1914 – 16 August 1936)
14. Félix Maroto Moreno (30 January 1915 – 16 August 1936)
15. Federico Herrera Bermejo (21 February 1915 – 16 August 1936)
16. Antonio Rodrigo Antón (8 July 1913 – 16 August 1936)
17. Saturnino Río Rojo (16 February 1915 – 16 August 1936)
18. Ramón Tejado Librado (20 April 1915 – 16 August 1936)
19. Vicente Majadas Málaga (27 October 1915 – 16 August 1936)
20. Valentín Díez Serna (11 November 1915 – 16 August 1936)
21. Félix Gómez-Pinto Piñero (18 May 1870 – 7 September 1936)
22. Perfecto Carrascosa Santos (18 April 1906 – 17 October 1936)
23. José María Azurmendi Mugarza (18 August 1870 – 21 September 1936)
24. Félix Echevarría Gorostiaga (15 July 1893 – 22 September 1936)
25. Luis Echevarría Gorostiaga (26 August 1895 – 22 September 1936)
26. Francisco Carlés González (14 January 1894 – 22 September 1936)
27. Miguel Zarragua Iturrízaga (11 April 1870 – 22 September 1936)
28. Simón Miguel Rodríguez (23 November 1912 – 22 September 1936)
29. Antonio Sáez de Ibarra López (25 March 1914 – 22 September 1936)

=== Missionary Sisters of the Immaculate Heart of Mary ===
1. Maria Carme Fradera Ferragutcasas (25 October 1895 – 27 September 1936)
2. Maria Rosa Fradera Ferragutcasas (20 November 1900 – 27 September 1936)
3. Maria Magdalena Fradera Ferragutcasas (12 December 1902 – 27 September 1936)

=== Missionaries of the Sacred Hearts of Jesus and Mary of Mallorca ===
1. Simó Reynés Solivellas (23 January 1901 – 23 July 1936)
2. Miquel Pons Ramis (8 July 1907 – 23 July 1936)
3. Francesc Mayol Oliver (31 May 1871 – 23 July 1936)
4. Pau Noguera Trías (24 November 1916 – 23 July 1936)

=== Franciscan Daughters of Mercy ===
1. Catalina (of Carmel) Caldés Socías (9 July 1899 – 23 July 1936)
2. Miquela (of the Blessed Sacrament) Rullàn Ribot (24 November 1903 – 23 July 1936)

=== Order of the Brothers of the Blessed Virgin Mary of Mount Carmel (Carmelites of the Ancient Observance) ===
1. Àngel (Àngel Maria) Prat Hostench (30 April 1896 – 29 July 1936)
2. Eliseo (Eliseo María) Maneus Besalduch (15 December 1896 – 29 July 1936)
3. Pere (Anastasi Maria) Dorca Coromina (30 December 1907 – 29 July 1936)
4. Manuel (Eduardo Maria) Serrano Buj (21 December 1912 – 29 July 1936)
5. Pere (Pere Maria) Ferrer Marín (1 June 1909 – 29 July 1936)
6. Josep (Andreu Corsino Maria) Solé Rovira (23 January 1919 – 29 July 1936)
7. Miquel (Miquel Maria) Soler Sala (15 March 1919 – 29 July 1936)
8. Joan Maria Puigmitjà Rubió ( 16 April 1919 – 29 July 1936)
9. Joan (Pere Tomàs Maria) Prat Colldecarrera (4 August 1919 – 29 July 1936)
10. Lluis (Eliseu Maria) Fontdecava Quiroga (12 May 1891 – 29 July 1936)
11. Gabriel (José María) Escoto Ruiz (10 August 1878 – 29 July 1936)
12. Ginés (Elias Maria) Garre Egea (9 October 1910 – 29 July 1936)
13. Josep Lluis (Eufrosí Maria) Raga Nadal (28 December 1913 – 6 October 1936)
14. Antonio (Ludovico María) Ayet Canós (25 July 1886 – 13 October 1936)
15. Àngel (Àngel Maria) Presta Batllé (17 February 1915 – 13 October 1936)
16. Ferran (Ferran Maria) Llovera Pulgsech (19 March 1902 – 22 November 1936)

=== Carmelite Nuns of the Ancient Observance ===
1. Maria (del Patrocini de Sant Josep) de Puiggraciós Badia Flaquer (28 August 1903 – 13 August 1936)

=== Salesians of Don Bosco (Salesians) ===
1. Sabino Hernández Laso (11 December 1886 – 18 July 1936)
2. Antonio Fernández Camacho (24 October 1892 – 20 July 1936)
3. José Limón y Limón (27 December 1892 – 21 July 1936)
4. José Blanco Salgado (10 November 1892 – 21 July 1936)
5. Victoriano Fernández Reinoso (27 January 1913 – 22 July 1936)
6. Emilio Arce Díez (31 October 1908 – 23 July 1936)
7. Antonio Torrero Luque (9 October 1888 – 24 July 1936)
8. Antoni Enric Canut Isus (17 February 1874 – 24 July 1936)
9. Andrés Giménez Galera (25 January 1904 – 27 July 1936)
10. Miguel Molina de la Torre (17 May 1887 – 28 July 1936)
11. Pablo Caballero López (16 February 1904 – 28 July 1936)
12. Honorio Hernández Martín (16 December 1905 – 28 July 1936)
13. Juan Luis Hernández Medina (19 December 1912 – 28 July 1936)
14. Antonio Mohedano Larriva (14 September 1894 – 2 August 1936)
15. Nicolás de la Torre Merino (4 March 1892 – 8 August 1936)
16. José María Celaya Badiola (24 February 1887 – 9 August 1936)
17. Francisco Míguez Fernández (9 February 1887 – 15 August 1936)
18. Félix González Tejedor (17 April 1888 – 24 August 1936)
19. Manuel Fernández Ferro (9 February 1898 – 25 August 1936)
20. Félix Paco Escartín (21 February 1867 – 31 August 1936)
21. Tomás Alonso Sanjuán (13 March 1893 – 31 August 1936)
22. Germán Martín y Martín (9 February 1899 – 31 August 1936)
23. Dionisio Ullivarri Barajuán (9 October 1880 – 31 August 1936)
24. Teódulo González Fernández (2 April 1911 – 9 September 1936)
25. Salvador Fernández Pérez (29 July 1870 – 18 September 1936)
26. Esteban Cobo Sanz (21 November 1905 – 22 September 1936)
27. Federico Cobo Sanz (16 November 1919 – 22 September 1936)
28. Manuel Gómez Contioso (13 March 1877 – 24 September 1936)
29. Antonio Pancorbo López (10 October 1896 – 24 September 1936)
30. Esteban García y García (28 November 1901 – 24 September 1936)
31. Rafael Rodríguez Mesa (5 July 1913 – 24 September 1936)
32. Juan Agustín Codera Marqués (25 May 1883 – 25 September 1936)
33. Tomás Gil de la Cal (7 March 1898 – 25 September 1936)
34. Antonio Cid Rodríguez (15 April 1890 – 26 September 1936)
35. José Villanova Tormo (20 January 1902 – 29 September 1936)
36. Francisco Edreira Mosquera (25 November 1914 – 29 September 1936)
37. Virgilio Edreira Mosquera (27 November 1909 – 29 September 1936)
38. Higinio Mata Díez (20 January 1909 – 1 October 1936)
39. Juan Mata Díez (11 February 1903 – 1 October 1936)
40. Carmelo Juan Pérez Rodríguez (11 February 1908 – 1 October 1936)
41. Enrique Sáiz Aparicio (1 December 1889 – 2 October 1936)
42. Pedro Artolozaga Mellique (31 January 1913 – 2 October 1936)
43. Manuel Borrajo Míguez (22 August 1915 – 2 October 1936)
44. Mateu Garrolera Masferrer (11 November 1888 – 2 October 1936)
45. Manuel Martín Pérez (7 November 1904 – 7 November 1936)
46. Francisco José Martín López de Arroyave (24 September 1910 – 9 November 1936)
47. Justo Juanes Santos (31 May 1912 – 9 November 1936)
48. Valentín Gil Arribas (4 February 1897 – 9 November 1936)
49. Anastasio Garzón González (7 September 1908 – 9 November 1936)
50. Miguel Lasaga Carazo (6 September 1892 – 6 December 1936)
51. Luis Martínez Alvarellos (30 June 1915 – 6 December 1936)
52. Juan Lorenzo Larragueta Garay (27 May 1915 – 6 December 1936)
53. Florencio Rodríguez Guemes (7 November 1915 – 6 December 1936)
54. Pascual Castro Herrera (2 September 1915 – 6 December 1936)
55. Esteban Vázquez Alonso (27 June 1915 – 6 December 1936)
56. Heliodoro Ramos García (29 October 1915 – 6 December 1936)
57. Ramón Eirin Mayo (26 August 1911 – 15 December 1936)
58. Pau Gracia Sánchez (23 March 1892 – 15 December 1936)
59. Andrés Gómez Sáez (7 May 1894 – 1 January 1937)
60. Pío Conde Conde (4 January 1887 – c. March 1937)

=== Salesian Cooperators ===
1. Antonio María Rodríguez Blanco (26 March 1877 – 16 August 1936)
2. Teresa Cejudo Redondo de Caballero (15 October 1890 – 20 September 1936)
3. Bartolomé Blanco Márquez (25 November 1914 – 2 October 1936)

=== Carmelite Missionaries ===
1. Teresa Subirà Sanjaume (Esperanza of the Cross) (27 February 1875 – 31 July 1936)
2. Maria Roqueta Serra (Maria Refugi of Saint Angelo) (20 April 1878 – 31 July 1936)
3. Vicenta Achurra Gogenola (Daniela of Saint Barnabas) (4 April 1890 – 31 July 1936)
4. Francisca Pons Sarda (Gabriela of Saint John of the Cross) (18 July 1880 – 31 July 1936)

=== Carmelite Sisters of Charity “Vedruna” ===
1. Apolonia (of the Blessed Sacrament) Lizárraga Ochoa De Zabalegui (18 April 1867 – 8 September 1936)

=== Order of Saint Augustine (Augustinians) ===
1. José Joaquín Esnaola Urteaga (8 February 1898 – 24 July 1936)
2. José Gutiérrez Arranz (14 April 1883 – 28 July 1936)
3. José Aurelio Calleja de Hierro (15 October 1901 – 28 July 1936)
4. Enrique Serra Chorro (3 December 1899 – 28 July 1936)
5. Antolín Astorga Díez (16 February 1906 – 28 July 1936)
6. Lorenzo Arribas Palacio (10 October 1880 – 28 July 1936)
7. Primitivo Sandín Miñambres (25 January 1893 – 28 July 1936)
8. Pedro Alonso Fernández (1 August 1888 – 28 July 1936)
9. Froilán Lanero Villadangos (3 October 1910 – 28 July 1936)
10. Gabino Olaso Zabala (18 February 1869 – 5 August 1936)
11. Ángel Pérez Santos (1 October 1877 – 5 August 1936)
12. Victor Gaitero González (18 October 1871 – 5 August 1936)
13. Felipe Barba Chamorro (5 February 1873 – 5 August 1936)
14. Anastasio Díez García (21 January 1867 – 5 August 1936)
15. Cipriano Polo García (16 September 1880 – 5 August 1936)
16. Emilio Camino Noval (9 October 1877 – 5 August 1936)
17. Luis Blanco Álvarez (20 November 1888 – 5 August 1936)
18. Luciano Ramos Villafruela (17 October 1884 – 5 August 1936)
19. Ubaldo Revilla Rodríguez (16 May 1885 – 5 August 1936)
20. Severiano Montes Fernández (14 March 1887 – 5 August 1936)
21. Manuel Formigo Giráldez (13 November 1894 – 15 August 1936)
22. Juan Pérez Rodríguez (2 December 1877 – 25 August 1936)
23. Florencio Alonso Ruiz (24 February 1889 – 25 August 1936)
24. Fortunato Merino Vegas (11 November 1892 – 25 August 1936)
25. Luis Gutiérrez Calvo (29 January 1888 – 25 August 1936)
26. Antonio María Arriaga Anduiza (15 December 1903 – 30 August 1936)
27. Vidal Ruiz Vallejo (6 November 1892 – 6 September 1936)
28. Jacinto Martínez Ayuela (3 July 1882 – 21 September 1936)
29. Nicolás de Mier Francisco (4 December 1903 – 21 September 1936)
30. Diego Hompanera Paris (12 November 1915 – 21 September 1936)
31. Leoncio Lope García (24 April 1902 – 28 October 1936)
32. Claudio Julían García San Román (9 January 1904 – 28 October 1936)
33. Avelino Rodríguez Alonso (9 November 1879 – 28 November 1936)
34. Benito Alcalde González (12 January 1883 – 28 November 1936)
35. Bernardino Álvarez Melcón (31 August 1903 – 28 November 1936)
36. Manuel Álvarez Rego (15 September 1908 – 28 November 1936)
37. Juan Baldajos Pérez (30 March 1872 – 28 November 1936)
38. Senén García González (15 July 1905 – 28 November 1936)
39. Samuel Pajares García (26 July 1907 – 28 November 1936)
40. José Peque Iglesias (4 February 1915 – 28 November 1936)
41. Marcos Pérez Andrés (18 June 1917 – 28 November 1936)
42. Sabino Rodrigo Fierro (7 December 1874 – 28 November 1936)
43. Lucinio Ruiz Valtierra (12 February 1905 – 28 November 1936)
44. Balbino Villaroel y Villaroel (30 March 1910 – 28 November 1936)
45. Mariano Revilla Rico (12 December 1887 – 30 November 1936)
46. Luis Abia Melendro (28 February 1919 – 30 November 1936)
47. Ramiro Alonso López (28 March 1915 – 30 November 1936)
48. Dámaso Arconada Merino (17 August 1904 – 30 November 1936)
49. Bernardino Calle Franco (17 May 1916 – 30 November 1936)
50. Pedro Carvajal Pereda (1 August 1912 – 30 November 1936)
51. Miguel Cerezal Calvo (12 December 1871 – 30 November 1936)
52. Victor Cuesta Villalba (13 May 1917 – 30 November 1936)
53. Josep Maria Dalmau Regás (16 December 1886 – 30 November 1936)
54. Nemesio Díez Fernández (20 February 1913 – 30 November 1936)
55. Matías Espeso Cuevas (22 February 1901 – 30 November 1936)
56. José Agustín Fariña Castro (20 March 1879 – 30 November 1936)
57. Francisco Fuente Puebla (17 October 1916 – 30 November 1936)
58. José Gando Uña (17 June 1910 – 30 November 1936)
59. Joaquín García Ferrero (21 August 1884 – 30 November 1936)
60. Arturo García de la Fuente (19 June 1902 – 30 November 1936)
61. Nemesio García Rubio (17 April 1912 – 30 November 1936)
62. Esteban García Suárez (1 August 1891 – 30 November 1936)
63. Benito Garnelo Álvarez (12 January 1876 – 30 November 1936)
64. Gerardo Gil Leal (3 October 1871 – 30 November 1936)
65. Marcos Guerrero Prieto (12 May 1915 – 30 November 1936)
66. Miguel Iturrarán Laucirica (28 September 1918 – 30 November 1936)
67. Jesús Largo Manrique (13 July 1912 – 30 November 1936)
68. José López Piteira (27 March 1913 – 30 November 1936)
69. Constantino Malumbres Francés (11 March 1872 – 30 November 1936)
70. Francisco Marcos del Río (27 January 1874 – 30 November 1936)
71. Ricardo Marcos Reguero (9 June 1891 – 30 November 1936)
72. Julio Marcos Rodríguez (16 March 1914 – 30 November 1936)
73. Julio María Fincias (29 September 1916 – 30 November 1936)
74. Román Martín Mata (22 May 1918 – 30 November 1936)
75. Melchor Martínez Antuña (7 April 1889 – 30 November 1936)
76. Pedro Martínez Ramos (23 October 1903 – 30 November 1936)
77. Isidro Mediavilla Campos (12 May 1913 – 30 November 1936)
78. Heliodoro Merino y Merino (26 February 1901 – 30 November 1936)
79. Juan Monedero Fernández (11 September 1881 – 30 November 1936)
80. José Noriega González (10 February 1915 – 30 November 1936)
81. Gerardo Pascual Mata (25 September 1915 – 30 November 1936)
82. José Antonio Pérez García (9 April 1918 – 30 November 1936)
83. Agustín Renedo Martín (26 August 1870 – 30 November 1936)
84. Benito Rodríguez González (21 March 1873 – 30 November 1936)
85. Conrado Rodríguez Gutiérrez (24 November 1901 – 30 November 1936)
86. Macario Sánchez López (29 February 1884 – 30 November 1936)
87. Tomás Sánchez López (8 September 1890 – 30 November 1936)
88. Juan Sánchez y Sánchez (27 January 1882 – 30 November 1936)
89. Pedro Simón Ferrero (22 October 1916 – 30 November 1936)
90. Luis Suárez-Valdés Díaz De Miranda (19 June 1874 – 30 November 1936)
91. Dionisio Terceño Vicente (25 May 1912 – 30 November 1936)
92. Máximo Valle García (30 December 1915 – 30 November 1936)
93. Pedro de la Varga Delgado (30 July 1904 – 30 November 1936)
94. Benito Velasco y Velasco (20 March 1884 – 30 November 1936)
95. Julián Zarco Cuevas (27 July 1887 – 30 November 1936)
96. Miguel San Román Fernández (12 August 1879 – 18 December 1936)
97. Eugenio Cernuda Febrero (15 November 1900 – 18 December 1936)
98. Epifanio Gómez Alvaro (7 April 1874 – 23 December 1936)

== Controversy ==
A number of controversies arose around the beatification of some of these clerics. The move was criticised by some because it recognized victims from only one side of the conflict. The Vatican said it was not about "resentment but... reconciliation".

One of the most notable of these is Cruz la Plana y Laguna, Bishop of Cuenca, a well-known supporter of the monarchic regime, who since the proclamation of the Second Republic had carried out a number of notorious political, pro right-wing campaigns throughout the province and had established close contacts with military officials such as general Joaquín Fanjul, who would lead the Madrid military uprising on 18 July 1936 in support of Franco's coup. The bishop of Cuenca is described by his biographer as "supreme advisor" to the general, as well as being closely involved with the fascist political party Falange. In 1936 he personally endorsed José Antonio Primo de Rivera, the leader of this party, as a candidate to the 1936 local elections. When the pro-coup uprising in Cuenca failed, the bishop was arrested by Republican militiamen for collaborationism. He was tried for conspiring against the Republican government and executed on 8 August.

The controversy surrounding the beatification of Augustinian friar Gabino Olaso Zabala, listed as a companion of Avelino Rodriguez Alonso, has been different. Friar Zabala was martyred during the civil war and was beatified. Attention was called to the fact that this priest had been formerly accused without conviction of carrying out acts of torture on Philippine friar Mariano Dacanay, in the days when friar Olaso was a missionary in the former Spanish colony during the time when the Katipunan was trying to wrest the islands from Spanish rule. The Roman Catholic Church proclaims that even sinners can repent and turn into saints, such as in the case of Augustine of Hippo.

Regarding the attitude of the Vatican, Manuel Montero, lecturer of the University of the Basque Country commented on 6 May 2007:

The Church, which upheld the idea of a 'National Crusade' in order to legitimize the military rebellion, was a belligerent part during the Civil War, even at the cost of alienating part of its members. It continues in a belligerent role in its unusual answer to the Historical Memory Law by recurring to the beatification of 498 "martyrs" of the Civil War. The priests executed by Franco's Army are not counted among them... Its selective criteria regarding the religious persons that were part of its ranks are difficult to fathom. The priests who were victims of the republicans are "martyrs who died forgiving", but those priests who were executed by the Francoists are forgotten.

While much of Republican Spain was anti-clerical in sentiment, the Basque region, which also supported the Republic, was not; the clergy of the region stood against the Nationalist coup, and suffered accordingly. At least 16 Basque nationalist priests (among them the arch-priest of Mondragón) were killed by the Nationalists, and hundreds more were imprisoned or deported. This included several priests who tried to halt the killings. They were not included among the martyrs of the Spanish Civil War, since they were not murdered in hatred of the Faith (odium fidei), a prerequisite for the recognition of martyrdom.

== See also ==
- Martyrs of the Spanish Civil War
- Saint Innocencio of Mary Immaculate
- The Martyrs of Daimiel
- Blessed Bartolome Blanco Marquez, cooperator of the Salesian Fathers
