= Lezáun – Lezaun =

Town and municipality in Navarre, Spain

Coordinates: 42°46′49″N 1°59′39″W

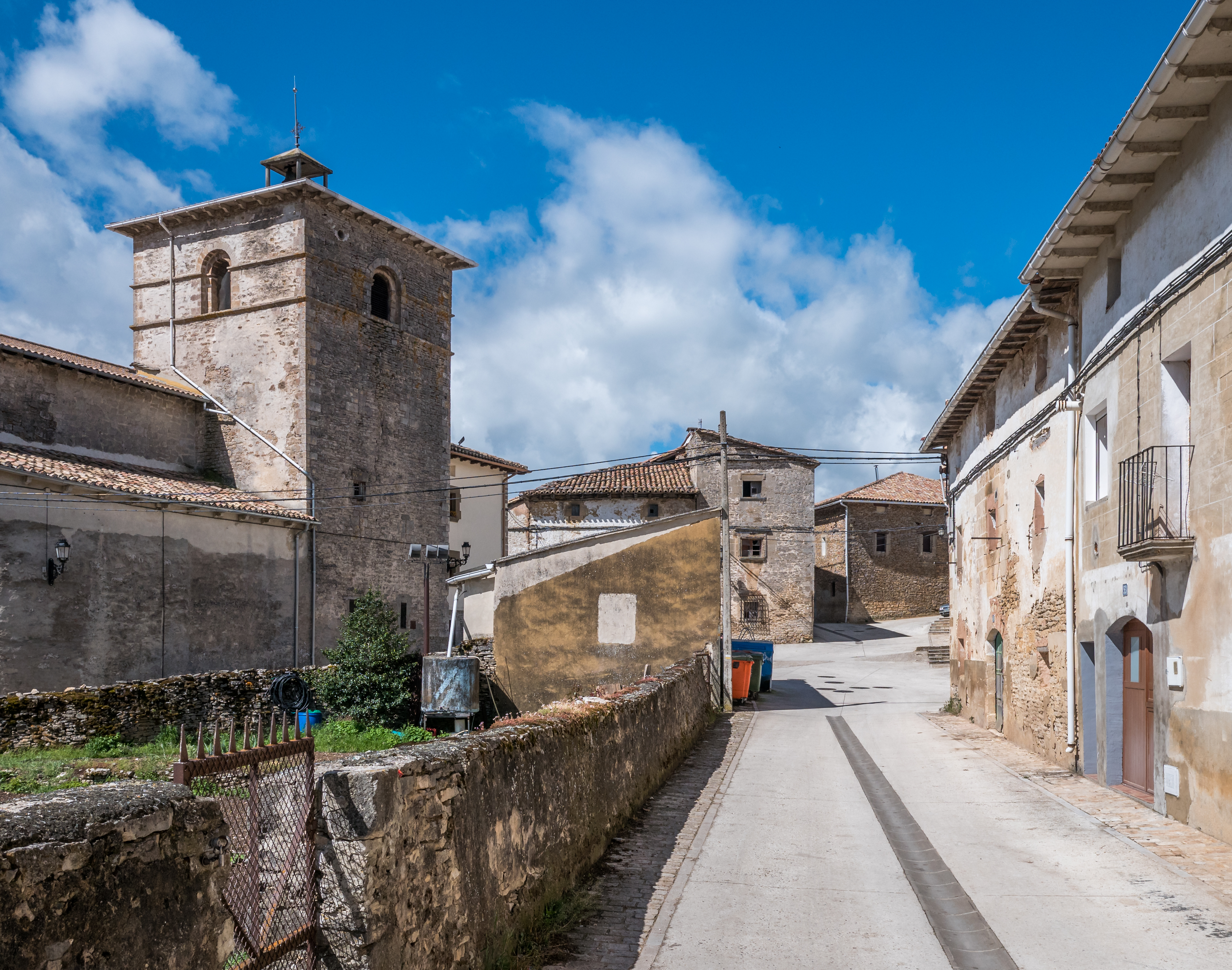
Lezaun, village houses and the church, Navarre, Spain

Lezáun (Basque: Lezaun) is a town and municipality located in the province and autonomous community of Navarre, northern Spain.

== Notable people ==
- Apolonia Lizárraga (1867–1936), religious sister, martyr and blessed
