= Casa de los Vitoria =

Former palace located in Valladolid, Spain

Coordinates: 41.651936°N 4.720647°W

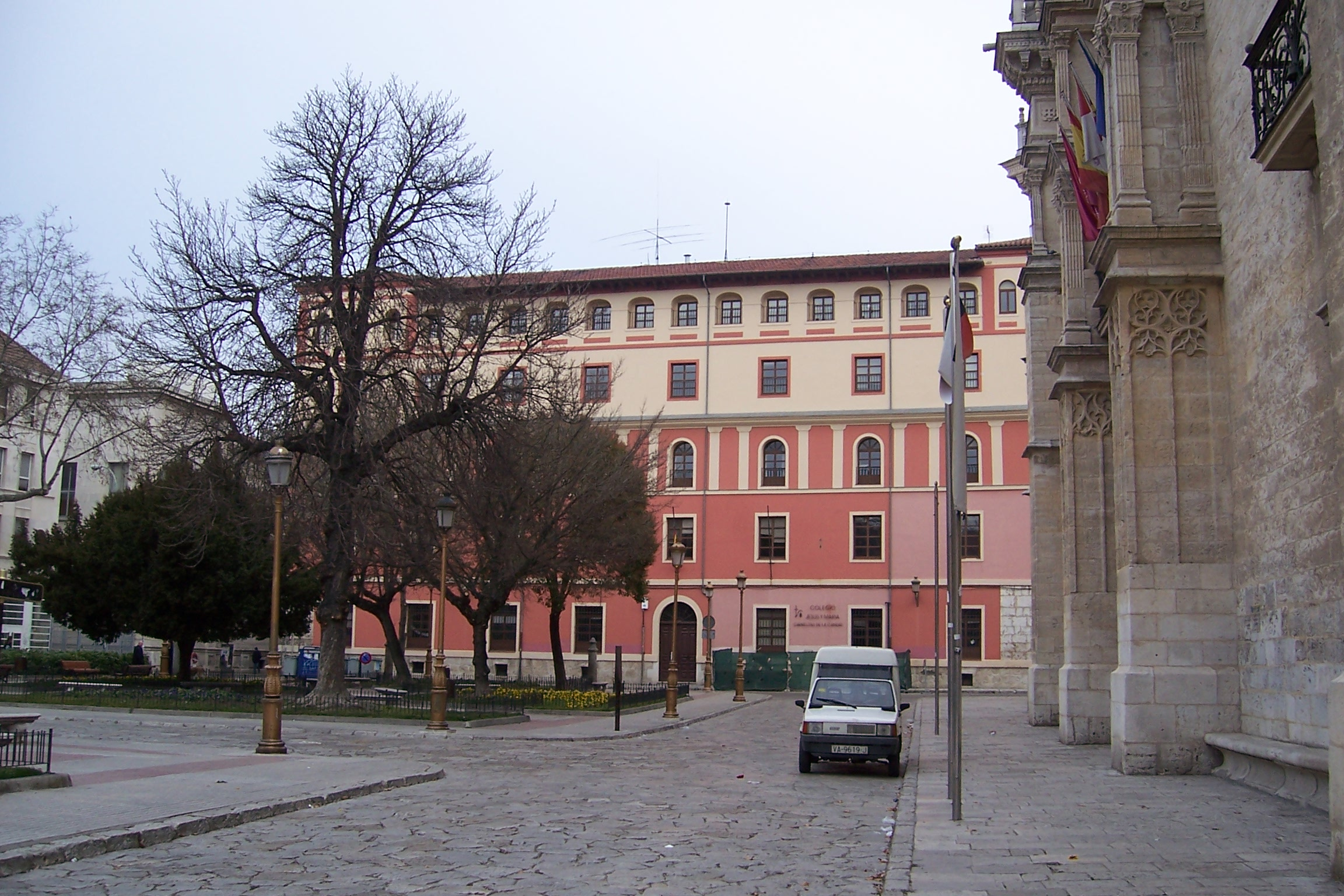
- Interactive map of the Casa de los Vitoria area

General information
- Location: Valladolid, Spain, Santa Cruz Square 7, 47002
- Current tenants: Jesus and Mary School
- Owner: Carmelite Sisters of Charity of Vedruna

The Casa de los Vitoria (English: House of the Vitoria Family or House Vitoria) is a former palace located in Valladolid, Spain, which has been part of the Jesus and Mary School of the Carmelite Sisters of Charity of Vedruna since 1883. It is a palace from the late Valladolid Renaissance, commissioned by Luis de Vitoria. The large building draws inspiration from Herrerian architecture, evident in its exterior through the lintelled portals on Librería Street, featuring two sections and adorned with family coats of arms.

The palace's original layout has been modified by raising its height, covering its courtyard, and adding a section to the rear façade. However, it retains its original typological configuration: a palatial structure organized around a central courtyard with an exterior appearance rooted in classical tradition, partially obscured by modern crépi finishes.

== History ==
Luis de Vitoria was a prominent figure in Valladolid's civic life during the 17th century. He served as Perpetual Treasurer of the Alcabalas and Royal Revenues until 1629 and accumulated a considerable fortune. In 1603, he purchased land on Librería Street, opposite the University, from the Cathedral Chapter. The Chapter had been pressured by the court's authorities to develop or rebuild the site, which they were unwilling to do. The land included seven old houses arranged around a courtyard known as Obregón’s, owned by a wall-builder who also held three other properties. Adjacent to this courtyard were two more houses: one owned by Juan de Santander and another near the College of Santa Cruz on Librería Street, belonging to the barber Francisco Garay. All were demolished when the Chapter sold the entire plot to Luis de Vitoria, with the condition that he build a new residence.

The palace passed initially to Luis de Vitoria’s direct relatives and, through successive inheritances, later became the property of the Marquis of Valdegema. The second Marquis, Carlos Francisco de la Cruz López-Altamirano Tineo Isunza Rejón, still lived there in 1854. His grandson, Ramón López de Tineo, who resided in Madrid, sold the property on March 31, 1883, to Francisca Capdevilla Vilella, a member of the Carmelite Sisters of Charity. Under her ownership, expansions were made to the south façade and the building’s height. Since then, the House has served as a Carmelite school.

== The building ==
The building was one of the finest of its time, the first quarter of the 17th century (1615), notable for its size and quality of construction. It is regarded as one of the best examples of Valladolid Renaissance domestic architecture with Herrerian influences. Its design is attributed to Pedro de Mazuecos el Mozo, a civil architect of the period who supervised and directed the construction and measured the land. The wall-builders were Juan del Palacio and Juan del Castillo.

It was built on three levels with its main façade facing Librería Street and the side facing the square of the Santa Cruz school. The ground floor sits on a semi-basement of ashlar with two small square windows framed by plates. Above these are two grilled windows on the ground floor. The main entrance, leading to a zaguan, spans the semi-basement and the first floor. It is lintelled and features classical decoration. The façade is clad in ashlar stone on both sides and at the corners. The second, principal floor has three balconies; the central one is larger, projecting over a corbel above the doorway, adorned with moldings and topped by a cornice. Family coats of arms flank it on either side. The third floor has three semicircular-arched balconies separated by decorative pilasters. The side façade follows the same window rhythm across all three floors. In 1890, two additional floors and an extension were added along this side.

The building features a square courtyard with two levels and galleries on all four sides, supported by square pillars with capitals replaced by broad, shallow moldings, a common construction style of the period.

Casa de los Vitoria

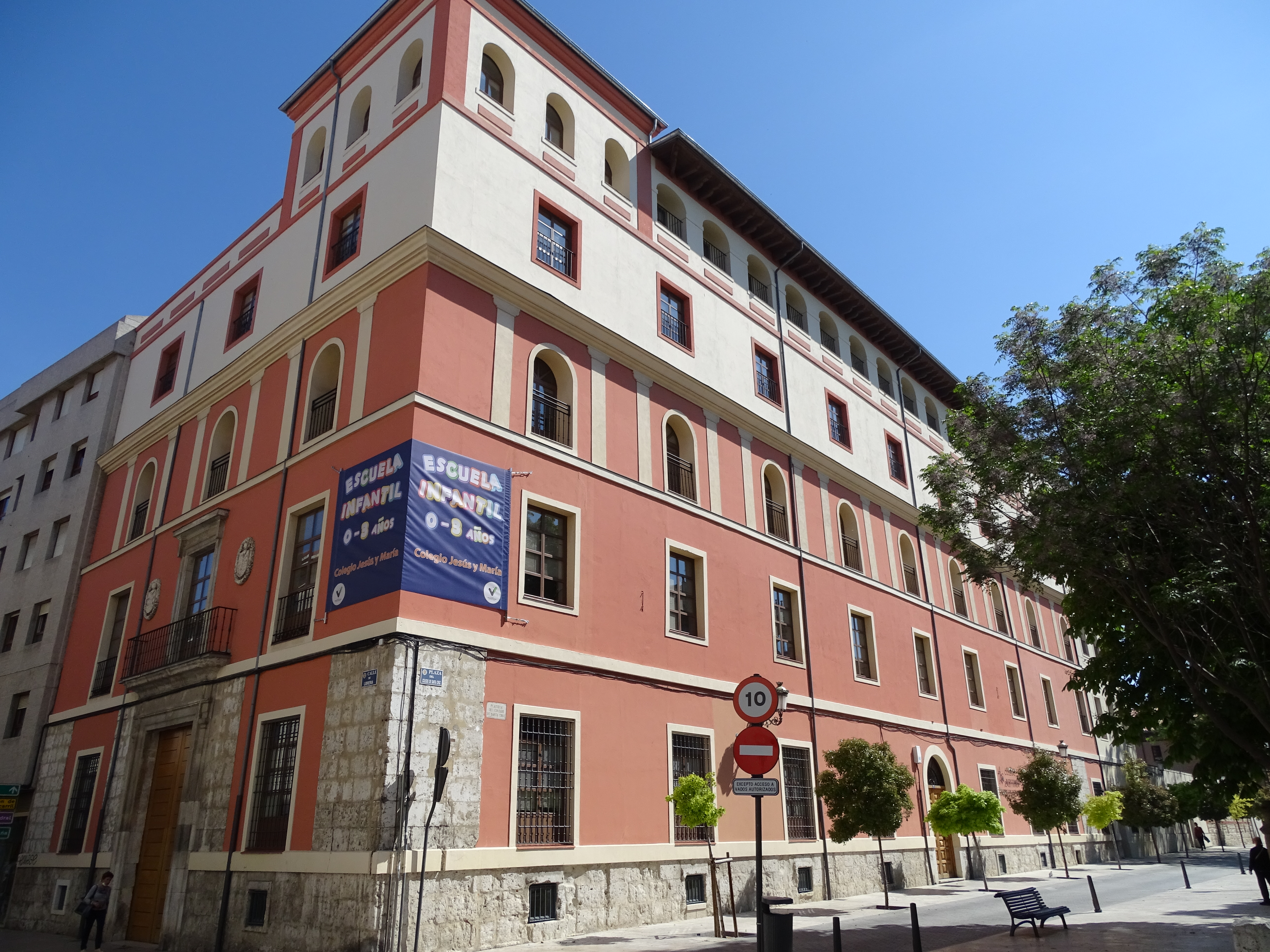
Building

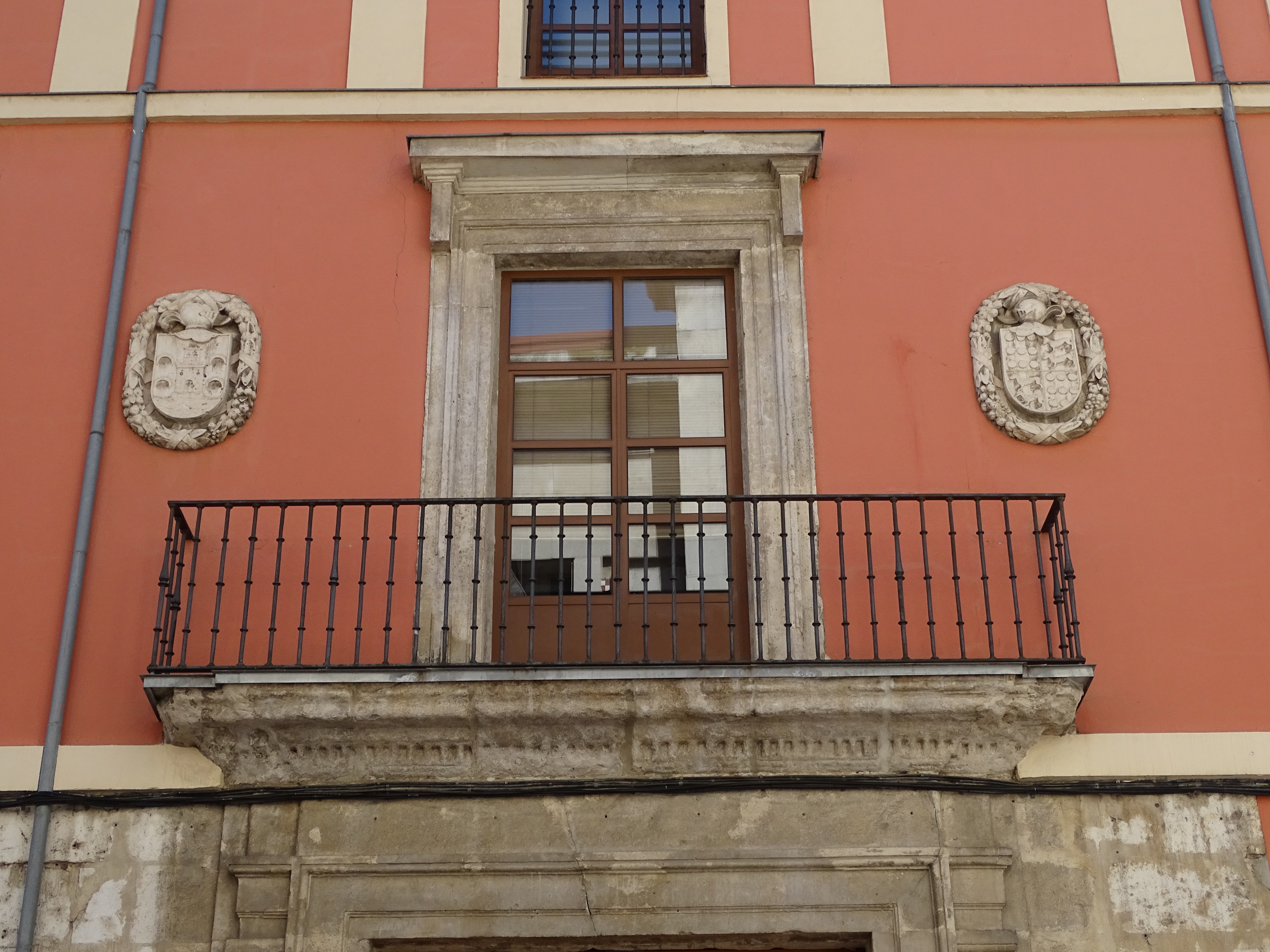
Main balcony

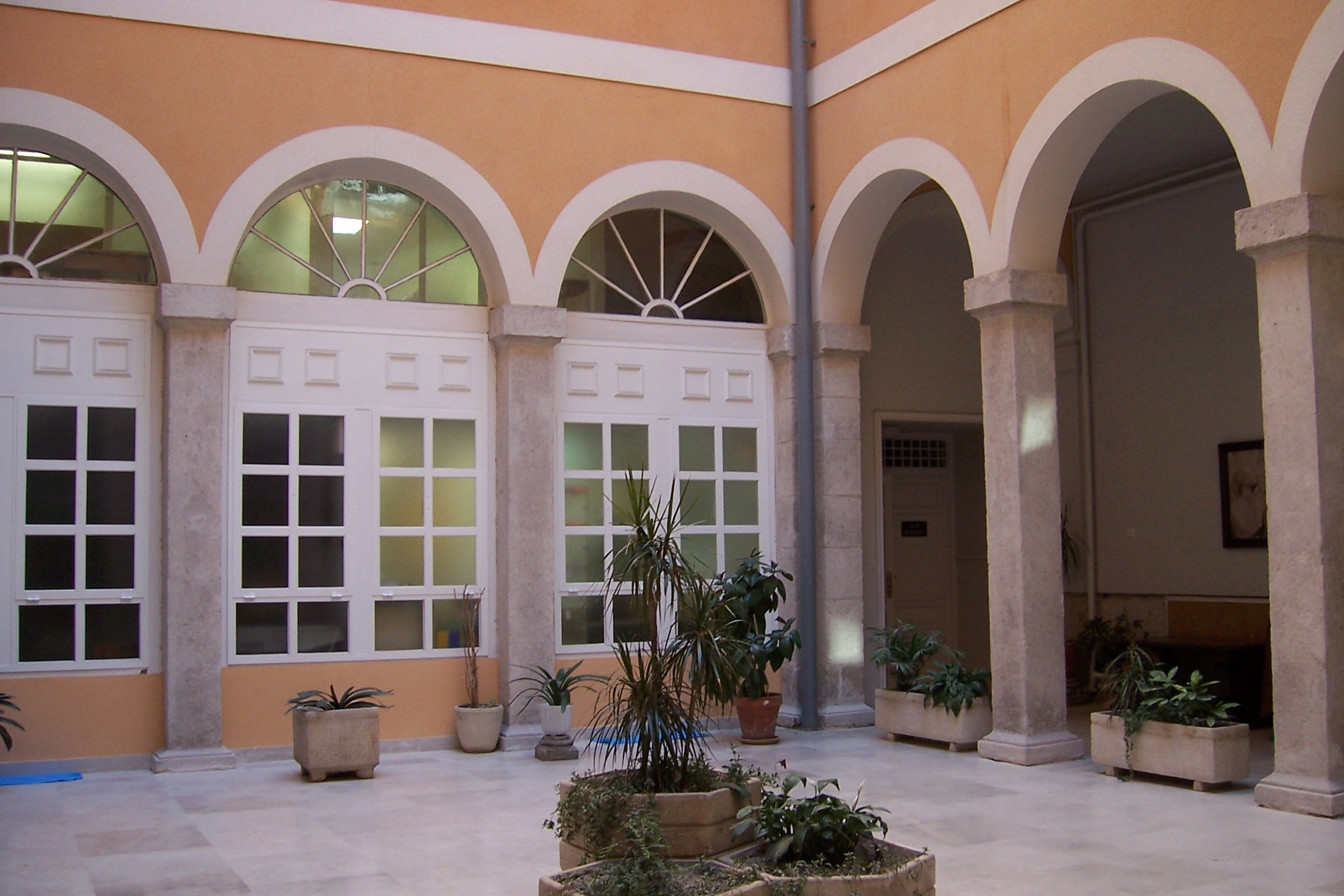
Courtyard

=== Heraldry ===
There are two family coats of arms on either side of the main balcony. The one on the left represents the Vitoria surname, the one to the right belongs to Luis de Vitoria’s second wife, Catalina Verdesoto y Palacios:

Heraldry

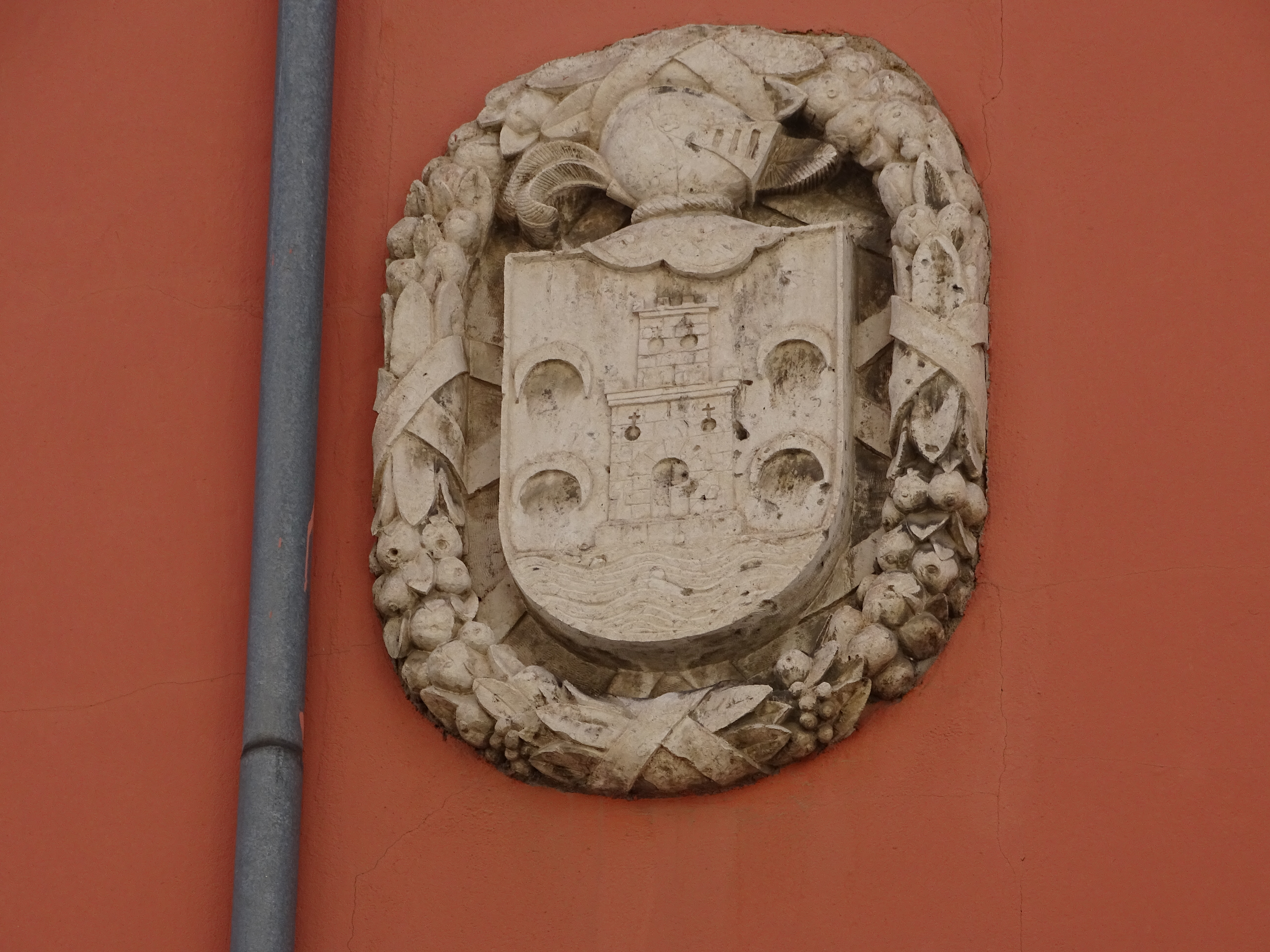
Vitoria family coat of arms

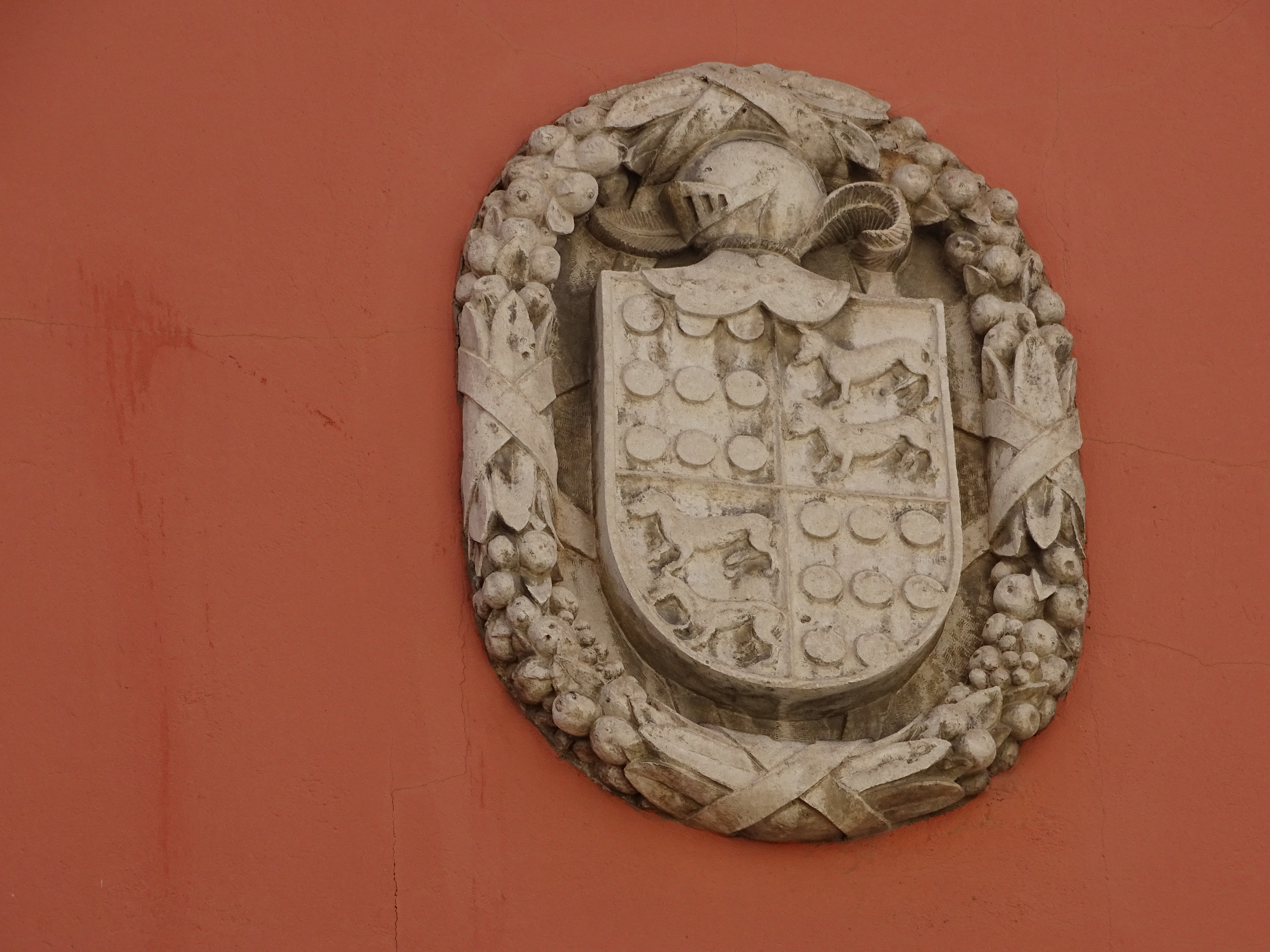
Catalina Verdesoto coat of arms

== Restoration works ==
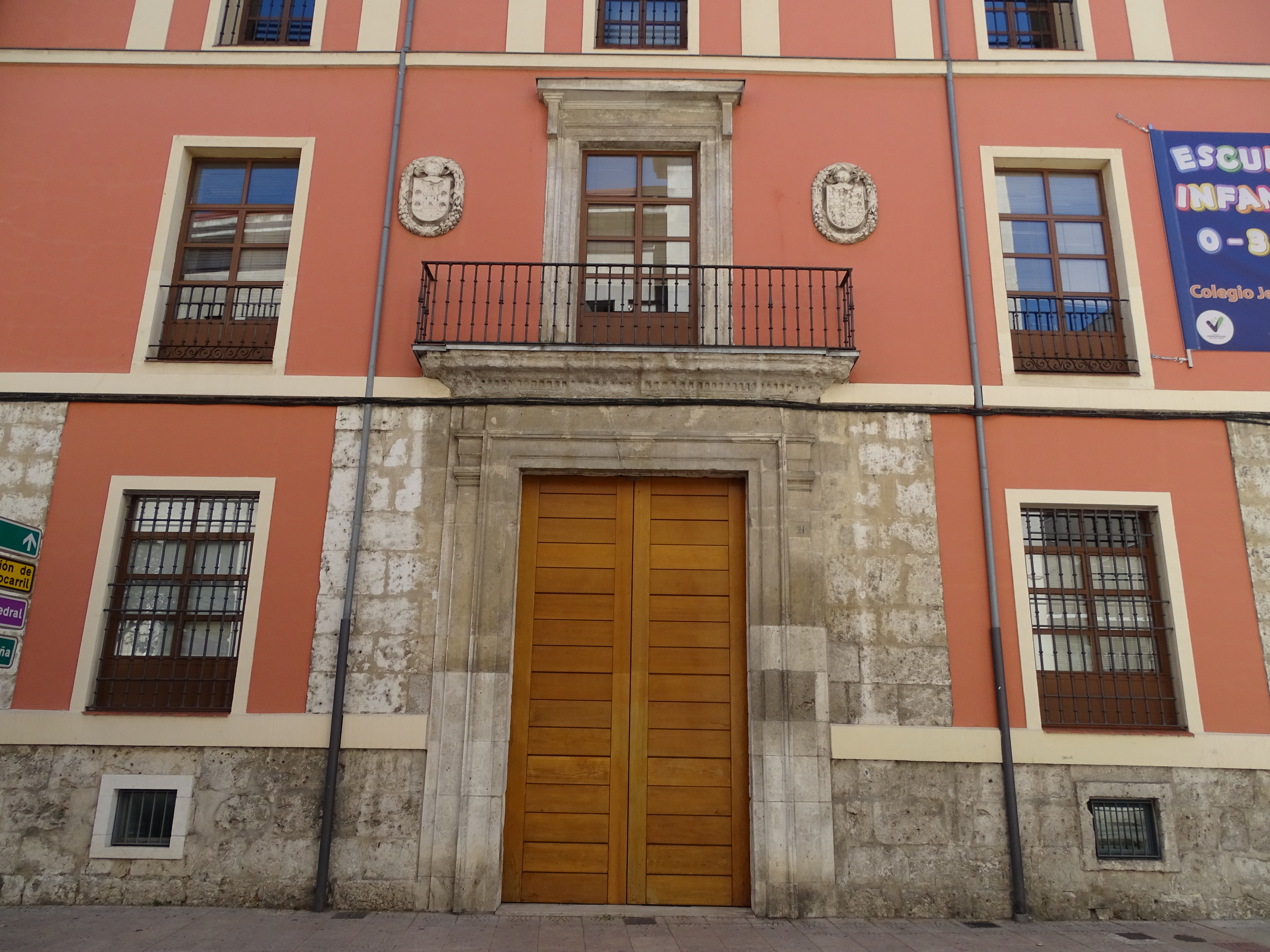
Restoration and refurbishment of the main entrance and left window

Since its conversion into a school in 1883, the House has undergone various modifications to suit its new purpose. Annexes were added in 1890, increasing the height and length of the building. Further adaptations were made in the 20th and 21st centuries, including what were then considered improvements such as the replacement of the chapel floor and the sealing of the main entrance on Librería Street.

A restoration plan was drawn up in 1999 to respect the original layout of the palace and repair any damage. Over twelve years, improvements were made in several phases, bringing the building up to modern standards.

The central courtyard was the first to be restored, retaining the roof tiles. The old north staircase was restored next and made accessible, replacing a modern staircase with one in keeping with the building. A lift space was also created.

During the 2006 summer break, sanitation, drainage and moisture treatments were carried out in the semi-basement and on the ground floor. Previously unknown rooms hidden by rubble were discovered in the semi-basement, along with two staircases, six carved stone doors and five small windows. These rooms were restored in the following years, preserving their architectural value. The original floor and foundations of the chapel were found among the rubble and restored for use. The choir and ceiling of the chapel were reinforced to modern standards, and the lift was extended to all floors, including the semi-basement. All these works involved a team of archaeologists responsible for the documentation and study of the discovered remains.

Lastly, the old main door on the Librería Street was opened after being sealed up since the beginning of the 20th century, restored to its historical significance and improving access.

== Bibliography ==
- Arnuncio Pastor, Juan Carlos (1996). Guide to the Architecture of Valladolid, IV Centenary of the City of Valladolid. Valladolid: Consortium. ISBN 84-85022-66-1.
- Fernández del Hoyo, María Antonia (1990). Notes on Classicist Domestic Architecture in Valladolid. University of Valladolid, Seminar of Art and Archaeology Studies, Bulletin Offprint, Volume LVI.
- Santibáñez Llinás, Miguel Ángel (2014). "Restoration of the Vitoria Family Palace in Valladolid". Traces of Palatial Architecture in Courtly Valladolid. ISBN 978-84616-94-19-8.
- Urrea, Jesús (1996). Architecture and Nobility: Houses and Palaces of Valladolid. Valladolid: IV Centenary of Valladolid. ISBN 84-86808-45-6.
