= Joaquina Vedruna de Mas =

Spanish religious sister

Saint Joaquina Vedruna de Mas CCV
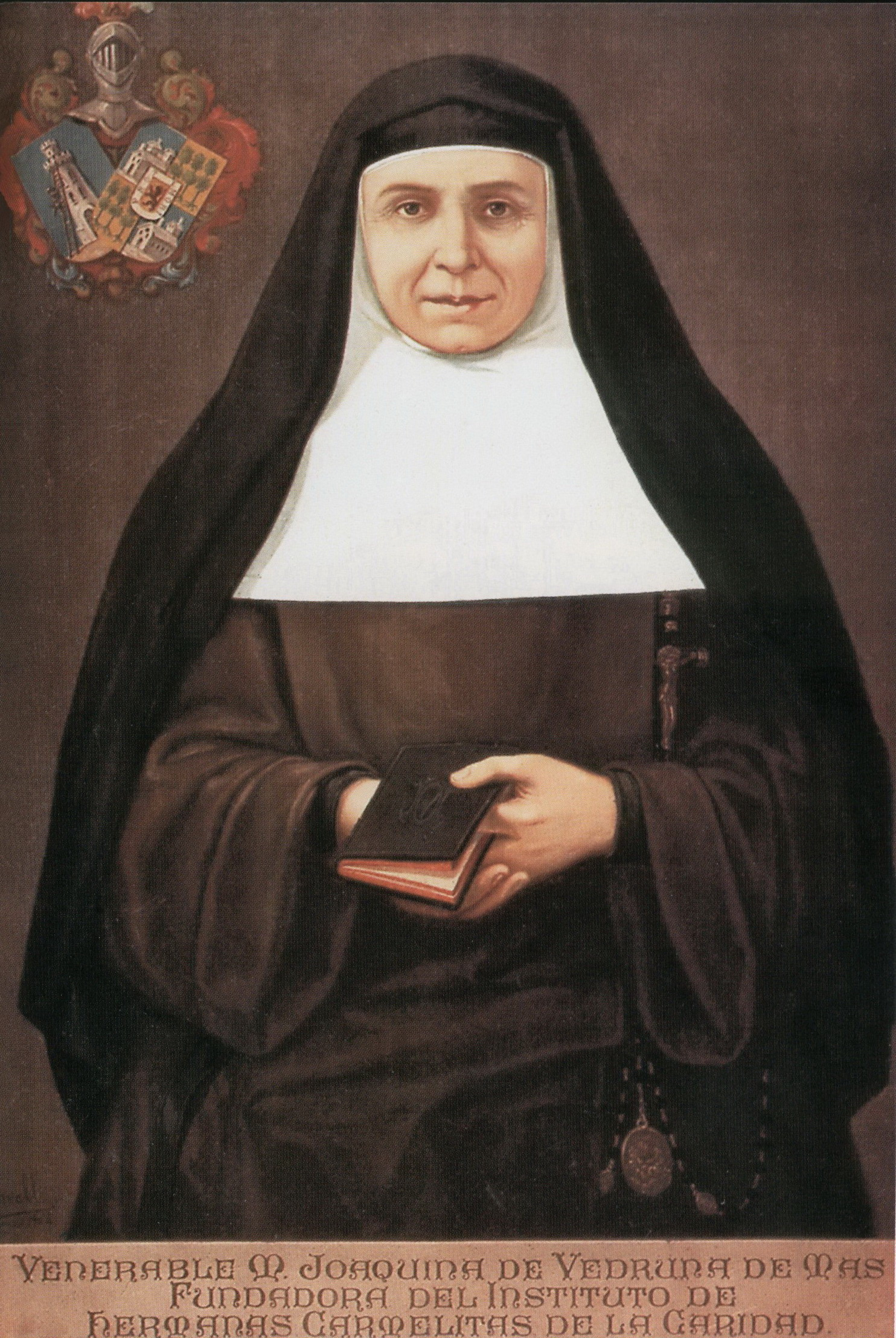
- Born: 17 April 1783; Vic, Barcelona, Kingdom of Spain
- Died: 28 August 1854 (71 years); Barcelona, Kingdom of Spain
- Venerated in: Roman Catholic Church
- Beatified: 19 May 1940, Saint Peter's Basilica by Pope Pius XII
- Canonized: 12 April 1959, Saint Peter's Basilica by Pope John XXIII
- Feast: 28 August, 22 May (Discalced Carmelites)

Joaquima de Vedruna Vidal de Mas, CCV (or Joaquina, and Joaquina of Saint Francis of Assisi in religion; 16 April 1783 – 28 August 1854) was a Spanish Catholic religious sister and the founder of the Carmelite Sisters of Charity.

First she married a nobleman despite her desire to become a nun though she and her husband both desired the religious life; the couple bore nine children but she and her children fled after Napoleon invaded the nation to which her husband remained to fight as a volunteer and later died leaving her widowed but free to pursue her religious inclinations. Her canonisation was celebrated on 12 April 1959.

== Life ==
Joaquima Vedruna Vidal de Mas was born on 16 April 1783 in Barcelona to the nobles Lorenzo de Vedruna – who worked for the government – and Teresa Vidal; her baptism was celebrated on the day of her birth in the parish church of Santa Maria del Pi. In 1795 she expressed a desire to become a Carmelite but her parents believed she was not mature enough to make such a decision. Her childhood was a pious one and she fostered a special devotion to the Infant Jesus while being known for her obsessive cleanliness and she received her First Communion in 1792.

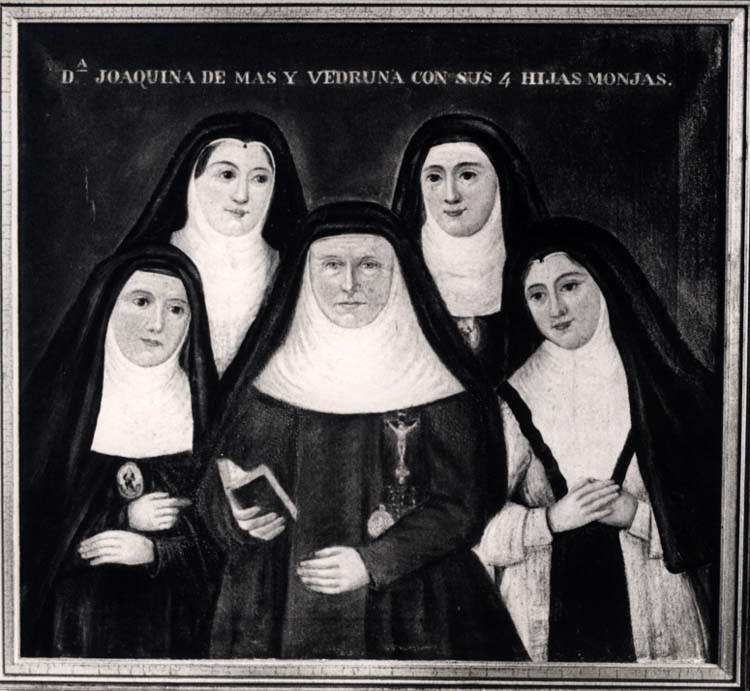
Saint Joaquina Vedruna de Mas with her four daughters who were nuns

On 24 March 1799 she married the barrister and landowner Teodoro de Mas (the firstborn of his own household) with whom she had nine children; both husband and wife later became members of the Third Order of Saint Francis and she became known as "Joaquina of Saint Francis of Assisi". Her husband was a friend of her father and was undecided about which of Lorenzo's three daughters to wed: he gave the three a box of almonds and the two older girls rejected it as a childish gift but she accepted and said: "I love almonds" and thus he settled on her. But Napoleon's invasion saw her flee with her children but her husband insisted that he remain to fight as a volunteer and he died on 6 March 1816; she moved with her children after a few months from Barcelona to their estate of "Manso Escorial" in Vic and she began to wear the habit of a tertiary. In Vic she began her charitable activities with the sick and with women. Her spiritual director, the Capuchin Esteban de Olot, suggested she establish an apostolic congregation devoted to education and to charitable works. Four daughters entered convents and two sons married while three others died as children.

The Bishop of Vic Pablo Jesús Corcuera told her the institute should be of a Carmelite inspiration; she made her vows to the bishop on 6 January 1826. The same bishop wrote the rule for the congregation on 6 February 1826 and on the morning of 26 February she and another eight women professed their vows while she founded the congregation at that moment. That morning the group attended Mass at a Capuchin church and then went to her estate to begin their new congregation. But she also collaborated with Anthony Mary Claret for the writing up of the rule. During the First Carlist War she had to flee from Spain because she had founded a hospital in the Carlist town of Berga that was threatened due to all of the fighting and so she went to Roussillon in France and was there from 1836 until 1842. Her congregation received the papal decree of praise from Pope Pius IX on 5 August 1857 while the congregation was aggregated to the mainstream Carmelites on 14 September 1860; official papal approval came on 20 July 1880 from Pope Leo XIII. In spite of serious challenges that the civil war and secular opposition posed the institute she founded soon spread into Catalonia. Thereafter communities were established throughout Spain and Hispanic America.

In due course she was forced to resign as the superior of her congregation due to sickness; she died during a cholera epidemic in Barcelona on 28 August 1854 but she fell victim to paralysis since 1850. Her first attack of apoplexy came in September 1849 with more following. Her remains are in the congregation's motherhouse in Vic. The congregatiaon now operates in nations such as Japan and Eritrea while in 2008 there were 2012 religious in 280 houses.

== Sainthood ==
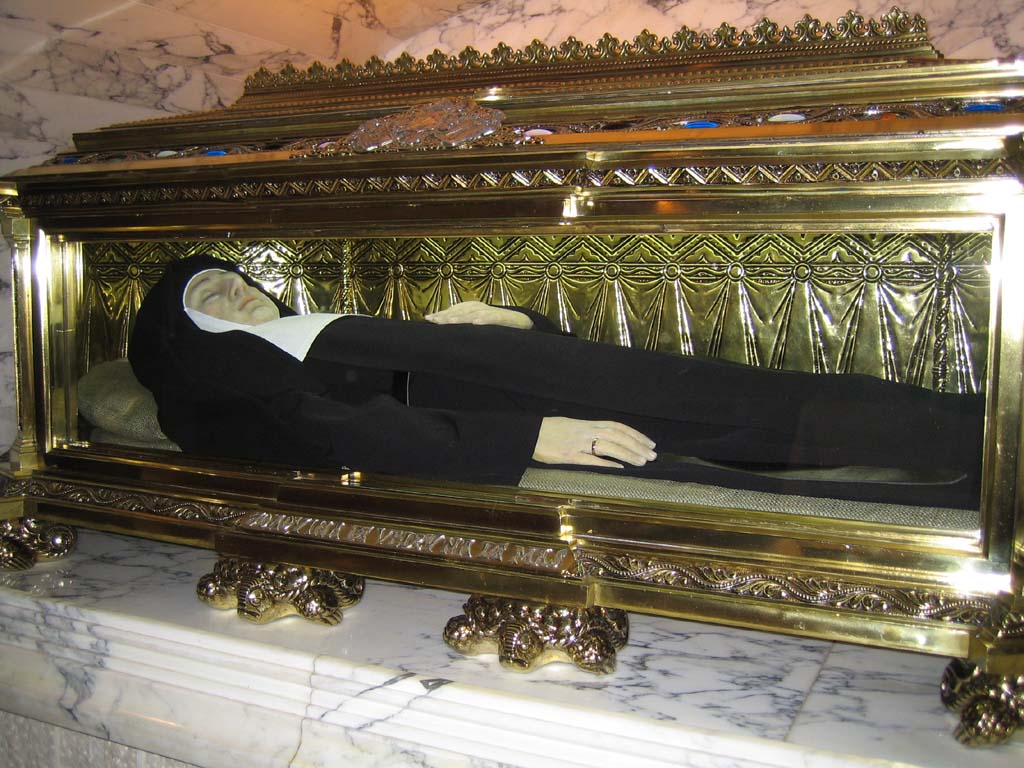
Remains found to be incorrupt

The beatification process commenced under Pope Benedict XV on 14 January 1920 while the confirmation of her life of heroic virtue allowed for Pope Pius XI to title her as venerable on 16 June 1935. The confirmation of two miracles attributed to her intercession saw Pope Pius XII preside over her beatification on 19 May 1940, and the cause for her canonisation was opened on 14 May 1952. Pope John XXIII canonised Joaquina Vedruna de Mas on 12 April 1959 in Saint Peter's Basilica.

== Sources ==
- Itúrbide, Emilio: Del matrimonio a la gloria de Bernini: Santa Joaquina Vedruna, fundadora del Instituto de Hermanas Carmelitas de la Caridad. Ejemplo vivo para todos los estados de la vida, Pamplona: Gómez, 1959
