= Carmelite Sisters of Charity =

Roman Catholic religious order

Carmelite Sisters of Charity-Vedruna
- Congregatio Sororum Carmelitarum Caritatis de Vedruna
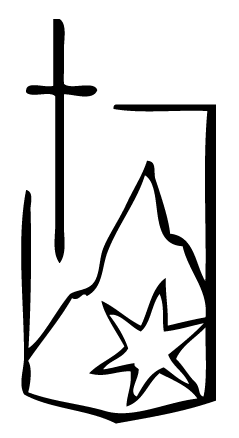
- Abbreviation: C.C.V
- Formation: February 26, 1826; 200 years ago
- Founder: Joaquina Vedruna de Mas
- Type: Centralized Religious Institute of Consecrated Life of Pontifical Right (for Women)
- Headquarters: Via Carlo Zucchi 12, Rome, Italy 00165
- Superior general: María Inés García
- Website: vedruna.org

The Carmelite Sisters of Charity (Spanish: Hermanas Carmelitas de la Caridad de Vedruna; Latin: Institutum Sororum Carmelitarum a Caritate; abbreviation: C.C.V. or C. a Ch.) is a religious institute of pontifical right whose members profess public vows of chastity, poverty, and obedience and follow the evangelical way of life in common.

Their mission includes education of youth and care of the sick and aged.

This religious institute was founded in Vic, Catalonia, on February 26, 1826, by Joaquina Vedruna de Mas.

The sisters have houses in Europe, America, Asia and Africa. The Generalate of the Congregation can be found in Rome, Italy.

As of 31 December 2008, there are 2012 sisters in 280 communities.

== History ==
After becoming a widow and devoting herself to the education of her nine sons, Joaquina Vedruna made her religious vows, with the vision of founding a religious congregation dedicated to the education of the youth and the treatment of the sick. For her project, she received the support of Capuchin Stefano da Olot and the approval of the Bishop of Vic.

Among the first directors of the institution was Anthony Mary Claret.

At the death of the founder in 1854, the number of members was about 150 and under the supervision of the second Superior General, Paola Delpuig de San Luis, it surpassed 1,000. The organization developed first in Spain and soon after founded houses in Argentina and Chile.

The Carmelite Sisters of Charity received the pontifical decree of commendation on August 25, 1857, by means of which they were constituted a religious congregation of pontifical right. The definitive pontifical approval was given to them by Pope Pius IX on September 14, 1860. On July 20, 1880, their Constitutions were approved.

== Activities ==
The Vedruna Sisters are especially dedicated to the Christian education of youth in schools and catechesis. They also work in hospital care and social inclusion.

In 2015, the congregation had some 1821 religious and 246 houses,present in Albania, Argentina, Bolivia, Brazil, Chile, Colombia, Cuba, Spain, United States, Philippines, Equatorial Guinea, Gabon, Haiti, India, Italy, Japan, Morocco, Peru, Puerto Rico, Dominican Republic, Democratic Republic of Congo, Togo, Uruguay and Venezuela. The general house is located in Rome and its current general superior is the religious María Inés García Casanova.

== Notable Members ==
Joaquina de Vedruna (1783-1854), saint, Spanish nun and founder of the Congregation. She was beatified by Pope Pius XII in 1940 and canonized by John XXIII in 1959.

Apolonia of the Blessed Sacrament (1867-1936), Spanish nun, superior general of the congregation from 1925 to 1936, when she was martyred during the religious persecution during the Spanish Civil War, along with 24 other nuns of the same institute. Apollonia was beatified by Pope Benedict XVI on October 28, 2007,joining the 24 others, already beatified by John Paul II in 2001, whose names are: Elvira of the Nativity of Our Lady, Mary of Our Lady of Providence, Mary Forsaken of the Blessed Sacrament, Teresa of the Divine Shepherdess, Agueda of Our Lady of Virtues, Mary Dolores of St. Francis Xavier, Mary of the Snows of the Most Holy Trinity, Rose of Our Lady of Good Counsel, Frances of St. Teresa, Niceta of St. Prudentius, Antonia of St. Timothy, Paula of St. Anastasia, Daría de Santa Sofía, Erundina de Nuestra Señora del Monte Carmelo, María Consuelo del Santísimo Sacramento, María Concepción de San Ignacio, Feliciana de Nuestra Señora del Monte Carmelo, Concepción de Santa Magdalena, Justa de la Inmaculada, Clara de Nuestra Señora de la Esperanza, Cándida de Nuestra Señora de los Ángeles, María de la Purificación de San José, María Josefa de Santa Sofía and Ascensión de San José de Calasanz.

== See also ==
- Casa de los Vitoria
