= The Theater at Virgin Hotels =

Resort theater in Paradise, Nevada, United States

The Theater at Virgin Hotels Las Vegas
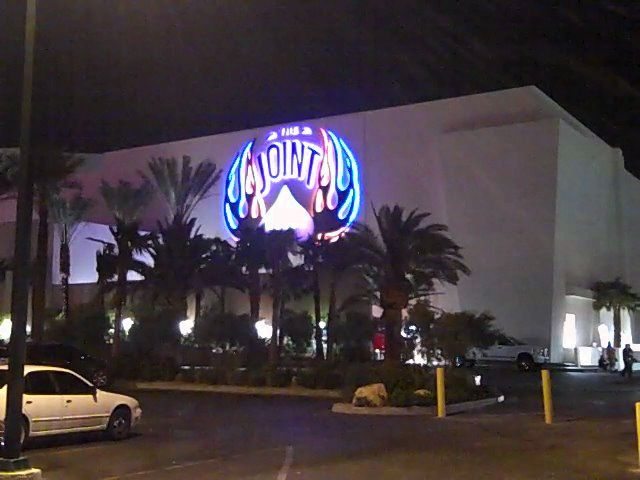
- Exterior view (January 2009)

- Location in Nevada Location in the United States Location in North America
- Interactive map of The Theater at Virgin Hotels Las Vegas
- Former names: The Joint (1995–2020)
- Address: 4455 Paradise Road, 89169
- Location: Virgin Hotels Las Vegas, Curio Collection by Hilton, Paradise, Nevada
- Coordinates: 36.1093°N 115.1531°W
- Owner: JC Hospitality; Virgin Hotels
- Operator: AEG Live
- Capacity: 4,500

Construction
- Opened: March 10, 1995; 31 years ago
- Renovated: 2009; 2020–2021
- Closed: February 3, 2020; 6 years ago
- Reopened: September 11, 2021; 5 years ago

Website
- virginhotelslv.com/venue/the-theater/

The Theater at Virgin Hotels Las Vegas, originally known as The Joint, is a theater located on the grounds of the Virgin Hotels Las Vegas in Paradise, Nevada, United States.

It opened as The Joint on March 10, 1995, as part of the Hard Rock Hotel & Casino (later Virgin Hotels). The venue closed on February 7, 2009, and a new, larger building was opened two months later, doubling capacity from 2,000 to 4,000 people. The casino hotel and music venue closed in February 2020, for renovations and rebranding as Virgin Hotels. The resort reopened on March 25, 2021, and the theater began hosting performances on September 11, 2021.

The theater is operated by AEG Live. It has hosted various concert residencies, and is a common venue for classic rock and modern rock bands in the Las Vegas Valley. It has frequently booked groups who traditionally favor arena types of venues. It has also hosted other events such as comedy acts and boxing matches.

== History ==
=== 1995–2009 ===
The venue, originally named the Joint, opened along with the Hard Rock Hotel & Casino on the night of March 10, 1995. The venue had capacity for up to 1,400 people. Numerous musicians performed on opening night, and the concert was filmed and subsequently broadcast on MTV the following night. This new showroom provided audience members with an intimate setting that allowed them an up-close view of performers, some of whom normally would have played in large stadiums. Its success led to similar music venues being built at other nearby resorts, including the House of Blues at Mandalay Bay, The Colosseum at Caesars Palace, and the Pearl Theater at the Palms resort.

Although the Joint was built as a music venue, it hosted other events as well, such as the world premiere of Con Air on June 2, 1997. In November 2003, it hosted a fundraiser screening of The Big Empty. The screening was part of an effort by the Hard Rock to compete against its rival, the Palms, which had hosted several film and television premiere screenings. In late 2003, Jeff Beacher began hosting a variety show at the Joint, which continued its run for the next four years. In September 2006, the Joint hosted "Imagine: The Artwork of John Lennon", a collection of more than 100 art pieces created by John Lennon, including drawings, serigraphs, and lithographs.

Andrew Hewitt, the Joint's original concert promoter, announced his impending departure in late 2006, after 11 years. AEG Live took over booking for the Joint, and events occurred less frequently there following Hewitt's departure. By 2007, the Joint had capacity for 2,000 people, and there were plans to demolish it for a new, larger Joint facility. The original Joint closed on February 7, 2009, with its final performance being Mötley Crüe. The facility had held more than 1,000 concerts since its opening. The original Joint was turned into additional gaming space for the Hard Rock Hotel.

=== 2009–2020 ===
The new Joint cost $60 million. It was built on what used to be 300 parking spaces, located on the east side of the Hard Rock resort property along Paradise Road. It was designed by Scéno Plus. Like the original Joint, the new one was also built out in a rectangular floor plan, though with an increased capacity for 4,000 people, up from the 2,000 number offered at the original venue. The larger Joint was created to better compete against the House of Blues and the Pearl Theater. The new facility included a second and third level that both wrapped around the room. The furthest seat from the stage was 155 feet. In the original Joint, sound quality would vary depending on where guests would be situated in the room. This was because of a lack of sound absorption, something that was implemented into the new Joint to correct the problem. The floor at the new Joint was angled to give shorter people a better concert view.

The new Joint opened on the night of April 17, 2009, with a performance by the Killers. This was followed over the next two nights with performances by Avenged Sevenfold and Paul McCartney. In addition to its primary function as a music venue, the new Joint also hosted private events and comedy acts, as well as boxing and mixed martial arts fights. The Joint was also frequently used as convention space. In May 2009, the Hard Rock announced that Rogue Pictures had purchased the naming rights to the venue, which would now be known as The Joint by Rogue.

For 2009, Pollstar named the Joint as the Best New Major Concert Venue of the year. Within its first 10 years, the new facility had won 22 local and national awards.

In 2010 and 2011, it hosted the Dew Tour Championships as the venue for Skateboard Street. As of 2014, the new Joint had sold more than a million tickets to 380 different events.

=== 2018–present: Redevelopment as The Theater ===
In March 2018, the Hard Rock was sold to a group of companies that included Virgin Hotels, and plans were announced to renovate and rebrand the resort as Virgin Hotels Las Vegas. The Hard Rock and Joint closed on February 3, 2020, to allow for the renovations to take place. The Joint initially was to retain its name, but this idea was scrapped because of an issue with naming rights. The venue is tentatively known as The Theater at Virgin Hotels Las Vegas, while the new ownership decides on a permanent name. Virgin Hotels Las Vegas opened on March 25, 2021, but due to the COVID-19 pandemic, the music venue would instead debut at a later date.

Christina Aguilera performed in the new theater on June 10, 2021, as part of an official grand opening celebration for the resort, following the end of most COVID-19 health restrictions. The theater includes seating for 4,500 people. Regular performances began on September 11, 2021, with a concert by Gary Clark Jr. AEG continues to book and operate the venue, which was renovated at a cost of $6.5 million.

On March 11, 2023, the UFC held its first event at the theater for UFC Fight Night: Yan vs. Dvalishvili. In April 2023 the Professional Fighters League held the first three events of its 2023 season at the theater starting with PFL 1.

== Notable performances ==
A Tom Petty concert in August 1999 brought in 1,786 audience members, although the Joint was only permitted by the Clark County Fire Department to hold 1,400 people.

Notable performers during the early to mid–2000s included Beck, Deftones, David Bowie, Robert Plant, The Rolling Stones, and Stone Temple Pilots. Lou Reed performed at the Joint in June 2003, but he became upset when audience members were busy buying alcohol at the bar during his performance. He left the stage out of anger, and people in the audience heckled him when he returned, prompting him to leave again before returning to the stage a third time. In July 2003, the original members of Duran Duran performed at the Joint as part of a reunion tour, which reunited them for the first time since 1985.

The Beastie Boys held their final Las Vegas performance on October 23, 2006, at the Joint. Fiona Apple held her most recent Las Vegas performance in September 2012, at the Joint.

On June 14, 2025, Philippine pop group BINI performed in the theater as part of the Biniverse World Tour 2025.

=== Residencies ===
For the new Joint, AEG Live intended to regularly book rock and roll residencies at the venue in addition to one-night performances. AEG announced on April 1, 2009, that Santana would open a two-year residency show at the new Joint called Supernatural Santana: A Trip Through the Hits. The band would play 36 shows a year. Santana began its residency in May 2009. DJ Tiësto began a year-long residency in 2011.

In February 2012, Mötley Crüe did a two-week residency at the Joint named Mötley Crüe in Sin City. Each two-hour show included aerialists, dancers, pyrotechnics, and video displays. Frontman Vince Neil said, "It's Cirque meets rock. This is not a show where you just sit there and look at the stage. It's happening all around you." Later that year, Guns N' Roses did a residency show.

Mötley Crüe returned for another residency show in 2013. Def Leppard also did a residency show in 2013, known as Viva! Hysteria.

Guns N' Roses did another residency show beginning in May 2014. Kiss began a residency six months later. The Kiss residency was heavily promoted throughout the Hard Rock resort.

Rascal Flatts did a nine-show residency in 2015, marking the venue's first country music residency. The band returned a year later for another nine-show run.

Journey did a nine-show residency in 2015, and returned two years later.

2016 played the Scorpions a five-night residency starting May 13 and ending May 21 as Part of their 50th anniversary Tour.

In 2018, Nickelback played a five-night residency starting February 23 and ending March 5 as part of their "Feed the Machine" tour.

== Live recordings ==
Live recordings at the original Joint included:

- Live from Sydney to Vegas – The Black Eyed Peas
- Live At The Joint, Las Vegas – 03/03/2006 – The Cult
- Aerosmith: Rockin' the Joint – Live – Aerosmith

Several live recordings also occurred at the new Joint:

- Viva! Hysteria – Def Leppard: CD, DVD and Blu-ray from their 2013 residency of the same title.
- Appetite for Democracy 3D – Guns N' Roses: Release date July 1, 2014, filmed during their 2012 Appetite for Democracy Residency.
- Kiss Rocks Vegas – Kiss: CD, DVD and Blu-ray released August 26, 2016; recorded November 5–23, 2014.
