= Edward Joseph Hannan =

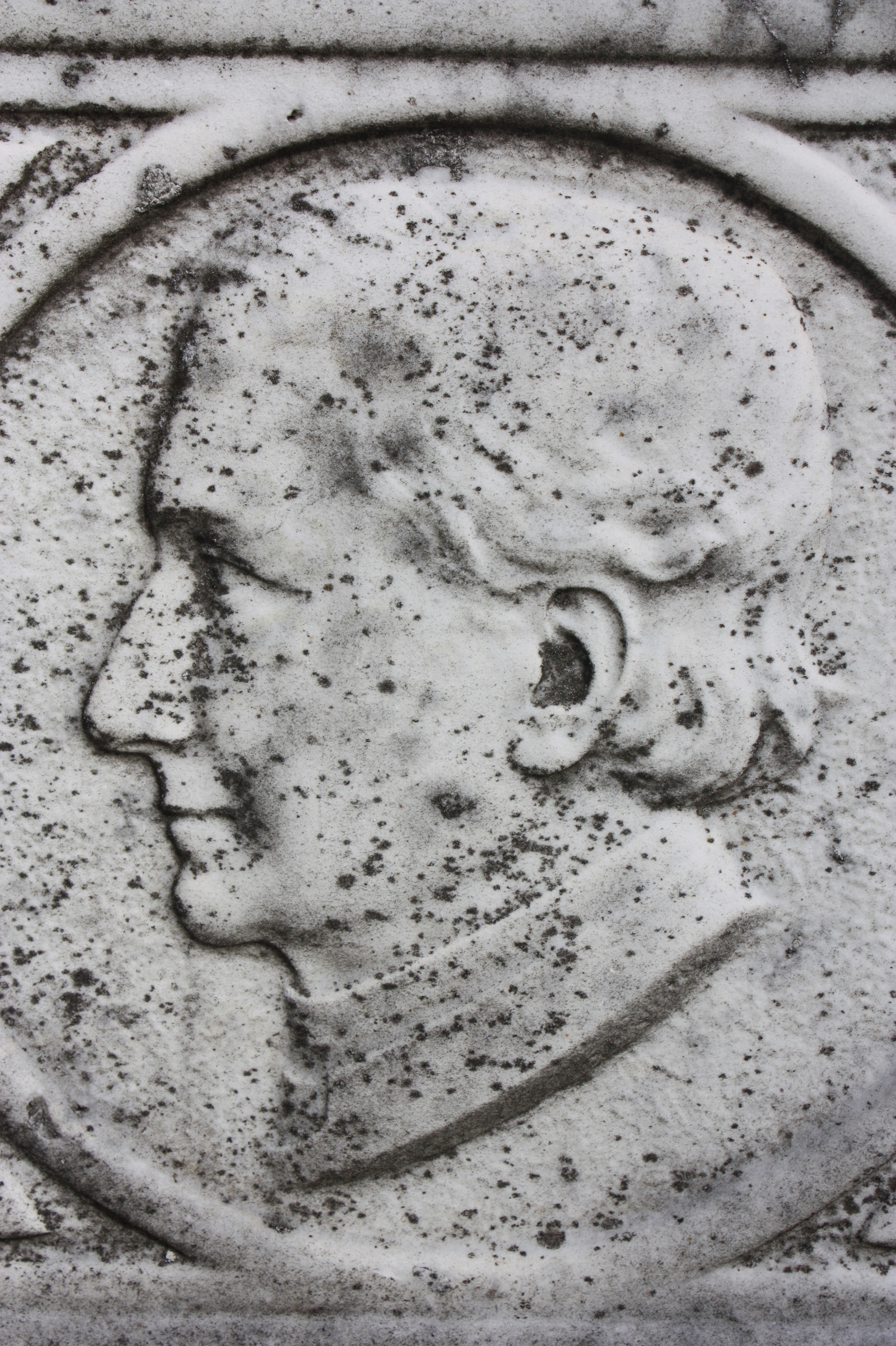
Edward Joseph Hannan

Canon Edward Joseph Hannan (Irish: Éamonn Seosamh Ó hAnnáin) (1836–1891) was an Irish-born priest, mainly remembered as the founder of Hibernian Football Club in Edinburgh.

== Life ==
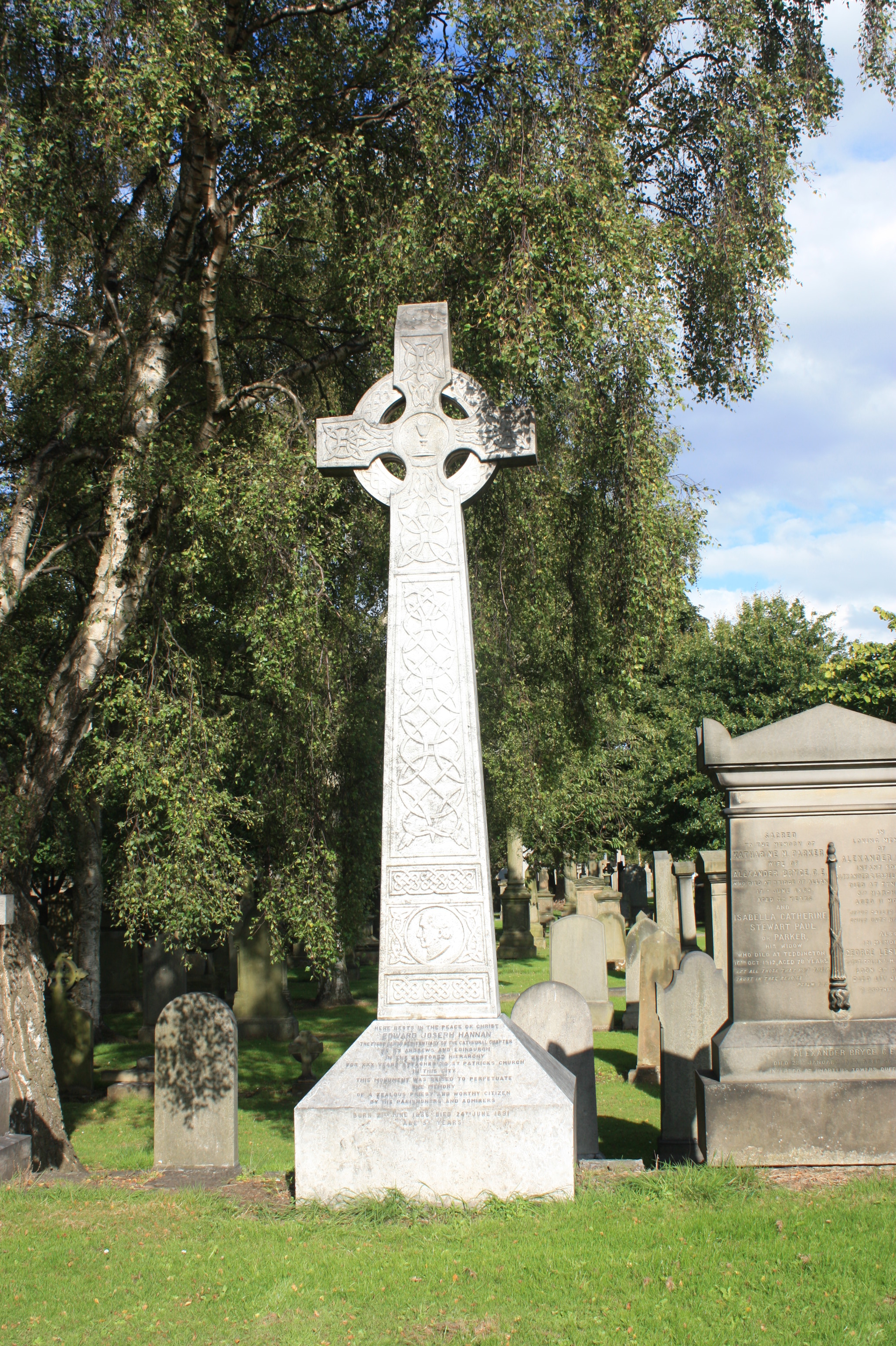
The grave of Canon Edward Joseph Hannan, Grange Cemetery, Edinburgh

He was born in Ballingarry, County Limerick on 21 June 1836. Hannan went to the minor seminary of St Munchin's College, Limerick, in 1853, before moving to All Hallows College, Dublin, in 1855, sponsored by Bishop Gillis of the Eastern District of Scotland. There he completed his studies and was ordained as a priest in 1860.

He remained in All Hallows for a year before being called to Edinburgh in 1861. After a short stay at the future St Mary's Cathedral, he moved to St Patrick's. During his 30 years in Edinburgh he did much to address the social problems of the poorer Catholics in the city, and founded a local branch of the Catholic Young Mens Society (CYMS) in 1865; the organisation founded in Ireland in 1849 by Monsignor Richard B. O'Brien, who had taught at All Hallows part of the time that Hannan was there. O'Brien was not Hannan's uncle, as others have claimed, his mother's maiden name being Sheehy. In 1869 he became priest in charge at St Patricks. He did much for the inhabitants of "Little Ireland", the Irish community in Edinburgh, centred on the Cowgate. In 1875, together with the 21 year old Michael Whelahan (originally from Co. Roscommon in Ireland) of the CYMS, and in part to mark the centenary of Daniel O'Connell's birth, he founded Hibernian Football Club. Hannan served as the club's first Manager and as President until his death. Despite only starting as a church club Canon Hannan did much lobbying resulting in acceptance of the team playing for the Scottish Cup in 1877, only two years after their foundation; and 10 years later winning it. He lived for the last 15 years of his life in the house he had built adjacent to St Patricks Church.

By 1885, he had been made a Canon but was denied a lengthy tenure since he died of pneumonia on 24 June 1891, following a bout of influenza.

He is buried on the western path of the original part of Grange Cemetery in southern Edinburgh. The large white marble memorial was restored By Hibernian Historical Trust in 2006.
