= List of listed buildings in Edinburgh/4 =

This is a list of listed buildings in Edinburgh, Scotland.

== List ==
Name	Location	Date Listed	Grid Ref. (Note: Sometimes known as OSGB36, the grid reference (where provided) is based on the British national grid reference system used by the Ordnance Survey. • "Guide to National Grid". Ordnance Survey. • "Get-a-map". Ordnance Survey.)	Geo-coordinates	Notes	LB Number (Note: Historic Environment Scotland assign a unique alphanumeric identifier to each designated site in Scotland, for listed buildings this always begins with "LB", for example "LB12345".)	Image
15-17A (Odd Nos) Dundas Street, Including Railings				55°57′24″N 3°11′55″W	Category B	28704	Upload Photo
79-85 (Odd Nos) Dundas Street And 34B Cumberland Street, Including Railings				55°57′32″N 3°11′59″W	Category B	28711	Upload Photo
22 And 22A Dundas Street, And 37 Northumberland Street, Including Railings				55°57′25″N 3°11′58″W	Category B	28716	Upload Photo
1-7 (Odd Nos) Dundonald Street, And 1 And 3 Cumberland Street, Including Railings And Lamp				55°57′32″N 3°11′50″W	Category A	28723	Upload Photo
Dean Street 33-41 And 1 Raeburn Street				55°57′30″N 3°12′44″W	Category B	28641	Upload Photo
Dean Terrace 2-6A				55°57′28″N 3°12′34″W	Category A	28642	Upload Photo
Dean Terrace 7-10A				55°57′27″N 3°12′36″W	Category B	28643	Upload Photo
Dean Terrace 11-15A And 1, 1A Carlton Street				55°57′27″N 3°12′37″W	Category A	28644	Upload Photo
Dean Terrace 16-21 And 2 Carlton Street And 1 Danube Street				55°57′24″N 3°12′41″W	Category A	28645	Upload another image
Dean Terrace Upper 1-6				55°57′22″N 3°12′42″W	Category A	28647	Upload another image
1-9C (Inclusive Nos) Doune Terrace, Including Railings And Lamp, With 8-11 (Inclusive Nos) Gloucester Square				55°57′21″N 3°12′28″W	Category A	28659	Upload Photo
1-10 (Inclusive Nos) Drummond Place, And 70-76 (Even Nos) Dublin Street And 31 And 31A Nelson Street, Including Railings And Lamps With Dublin Meuse				55°57′29″N 3°11′40″W	Category A	28665	Upload Photo
21-30 (Inclusive Nos) Drummond Place, And 2 And 2A-D Scotland Street And 2-6 (Even Nos) Dundonald Street(Includes 1,2,3,13 And 14 West Scotland Street Lane), Including Railings And Lamps				55°57′33″N 3°11′43″W	Category A	28668	Upload Photo
37-42 (Inclusive Nos) Drummond Place, And 77 Dublin Street And 1-3A (Odd Nos) London Street, Including Railings And Lamps With 2 And 3 Dublin Street Lane North				55°57′31″N 3°11′36″W	Category A	28670	Upload Photo
1, 2, 3, Riverside And 10,11,12,13,14 And 15 Cramond Village				55°58′48″N 3°18′02″W	Category A	28606	Upload Photo
16 Cramond Glebe Road, Cramond Manse Including Former Stables, Boundary Wall, Gatepiers And Gates				55°58′39″N 3°17′58″W	Category B	28608	Upload Photo
59-73 (Odd Nos) Cumberland Street, Including Railings				55°57′29″N 3°12′06″W	Category B	28611	Upload Photo
4-34A (Even Nos) Cumberland Street And 1-12B Cumberland Street Lane North East, Including Railings				55°57′32″N 3°11′55″W	Category B	28613	Upload Photo
79 Dalkeith Road Including Boundary Walls And Pedestrian Gates				55°56′12″N 3°10′13″W	Category B	28617	Upload Photo
81 Dalkeith Road Including Boundary Walls And Pedestrian Gates				55°56′12″N 3°10′12″W	Category C(S)	28618	Upload Photo
78 And 80 Dalkeith Road, Including Boundary Walls And Piers				55°56′13″N 3°10′17″W	Category B	28626	Upload Photo
Danube Street 3-23				55°57′25″N 3°12′43″W	Category A	28630	Upload another image
Danube Street 4-34A				55°57′23″N 3°12′43″W	Category A	28631	Upload another image
1-11 (Odd Nos) Darnaway Street, And 1-4 (Inclusive Nos) Gloucester Lane, Including Railings And Lamps				55°57′17″N 3°12′25″W	Category A	28632	Upload Photo
Dean Path, 1-25 Dean Path Buildings				55°57′09″N 3°13′05″W	Category B	28634	Upload another image
Dean Street 11-31				55°57′31″N 3°12′41″W	Category B	28640	Upload Photo
1-11 (Inclusive Numbers) Coates Crescent, 2 Stafford Street, 1 Walker Street, Including Railings				55°56′57″N 3°12′41″W	Category A	28563	Upload another image
1-31 (Odd Nos) Coates Gardens, Including Railings				55°56′49″N 3°13′19″W	Category B	28565	Upload Photo
33-43 (Odd Nos) Coates Gardens, Including Railings				55°56′51″N 3°13′19″W	Category B	28566	Upload Photo
2-40 (Even Nos) Coates Gardens, Including Railings				55°56′49″N 3°13′17″W	Category B	28567	Upload Photo
9 Cockburn Street				55°57′03″N 3°11′27″W	Category B	28571	Upload Photo
19 And 21 Cockburn Street				55°57′03″N 3°11′25″W	Category B	28574	Upload Photo
1, 3, 5, 7 Coltbridge Terrace, Including Boundary Walls				55°56′50″N 3°14′10″W	Category B	28581	Upload Photo
Comely Bank 4-23				55°57′34″N 3°13′16″W	Category B	28583	Upload Photo
Cowgate, Gateway At East Of St Patrick's Roman Catholic Church				55°56′58″N 3°11′02″W	Category C(S)	28593	Upload another image
1-15 (Odd Nos) Cowgatehead				55°56′52″N 3°11′37″W	Category C(S)	28598	Upload Photo
7-21 (Inclusive Nos) Claremont Crescent				55°57′50″N 3°11′30″W	Category A	28524	Upload Photo
2-24 (Even Nos) East Claremont Street Including Boundary Walls And Railings				55°57′39″N 3°11′33″W	Category B	28535	Upload Photo
Clarendon Crescent 1-22 And 1, 1A Oxford Terrace				55°57′15″N 3°12′52″W	Category A	28544	Upload Photo
Clerk Street 46-66, And 3-5 Montague Street And 1-3 Rankeillor Street				55°56′32″N 3°10′54″W	Category B	28549	Upload Photo
Clerk Street South, 11-29				55°56′28″N 3°10′51″W	Category C(S)	28550	Upload Photo
Clerk Street South 12-32 And 18 Hope Park Terrace				55°56′26″N 3°10′52″W	Category C(S)	28555	Upload Photo
Clerk Street South, 44-74				55°56′24″N 3°10′50″W	Category C(S)	28556	Upload Photo
Causeway, The Ian's Hill House Duddingston				55°56′34″N 3°08′46″W	Category B	28493	Upload Photo
32 Chambers Street, Bank Of Scotland				55°56′50″N 3°11′28″W	Category B	28497	Upload Photo
12-17 (Inclusive Nos) Charlotte Square With 10-18 (Even Nos) Randolph Lane, Railings, Lamp Standards And Boundary Walls				55°57′07″N 3°12′34″W	Category A	28503	Upload another image
18-23 (Inclusive Nos) Charlotte Square With Railings, Lamp Standards And Boundary Walls				55°57′04″N 3°12′33″W	Category A	28504	Upload another image
40-46 (Inclusive Nos) Charlotte Square And 143 George Street With Railings And Lamp Standards				55°57′08″N 3°12′23″W	Category A	28507	Upload another image
1 North Charlotte Street With Railings And Boundary Walls				55°57′10″N 3°12′24″W	Category A	28508	Upload Photo
15 South Charlotte Street With Railings And Lamp Standard				55°57′04″N 3°12′21″W	Category A	28515	Upload another image
3-21 (Odd Numbers) Chester Street				55°57′00″N 3°12′59″W	Category B	28517	Upload Photo
23-35 (Odd Numbers) Chester Street				55°56′59″N 3°13′03″W	Category B	28518	Upload Photo
Cheyne Street 1-31 (Odd Nos) And 43, 45, 47 Dean Street				55°57′30″N 3°12′45″W	Category B	28520	Upload Photo
95 Canongate, 4 Reid' Court (Russell House)				55°57′08″N 3°10′39″W	Category B	28430	Upload Photo
297 And 299 Canongate, 2 Jeffrey Street And 1 Cranston Street				55°57′03″N 3°11′03″W	Category B	28439	Upload another image
82 And 84 Canongate, (Nisbet Of Dirleton's House)				55°57′07″N 3°10′37″W	Category B	28441	Upload another image
174 Canongate, Moray House Including Gates, Gatepiers, Porters Lodge And Summerhouse				55°57′04″N 3°10′50″W	Category A	28449	Upload another image See more images
Canongate, Moray House, Garden Gateway				55°57′01″N 3°10′49″W	Category B	28450	Upload another image
176-184 (Even Nos) Canongate St John's Land				55°57′03″N 3°10′52″W	Category C(S)	28451	Upload Photo
Canongate, 3, 4, 5, 6 And 6B Chessel's Court (S Block) Including St Saviour's Child Garden				55°57′01″N 3°10′59″W	Category A	28454	Upload another image
Carlton Street 3-13				55°57′26″N 3°12′38″W	Category A	28457	Upload Photo
1 Carlton Terrace Including Railings And Boundary Walls				55°57′22″N 3°10′25″W	Category A	28460	Upload another image
15-19 (Odd Nos) Castle Street With Railings				55°57′06″N 3°12′10″W	Category B	28462	Upload Photo
21 And 21A Castle Street With Railings				55°57′08″N 3°12′11″W	Category B	28463	Upload Photo
63-69 (Odd Nos) North Castle Street And 59 Queen Street With Railings				55°57′13″N 3°12′14″W	Category A	28468	Upload Photo
8-12 (Inclusive Nos) Castle Terrace, Including Boundary Wall And Railings				55°56′54″N 3°12′19″W	Category B	28483	Upload Photo
Buccleuch Place 22, 22A				55°56′33″N 3°11′16″W	Category B	28389	Upload Photo
Buccleuch Place 23-25				55°56′33″N 3°11′16″W	Category B	28390	Upload another image
7-15 (Odd Numbers) Buccleuch Street				55°56′36″N 3°11′04″W	Category C(S)	28393	Upload Photo
2,4 Buccleuch Street				55°56′37″N 3°11′07″W	Category B	28397	Upload Photo
36-42 Buccleuch Street				55°56′34″N 3°11′05″W	Category B	28399	Upload Photo
90,92 Buccleuch Street				55°56′30″N 3°11′02″W	Category B	28402	Upload another image
1-34 (Inclusive Numbers) Buckingham Terrace, Including Railings And Boundary Walls				55°57′16″N 3°12′58″W	Category B	28405	Upload another image
35-40 (Inclusive Numbers) Buckingham Terrace, And 10A Belgrave Place, Including Railings				55°57′17″N 3°13′14″W	Category B	28406	Upload Photo
24 Calton Hill Including Railings And Boundary Wall				55°57′16″N 3°11′08″W	Category B	28409	Upload Photo
Canon Street 8				55°57′43″N 3°11′55″W	Category C(S)	28423	Upload Photo
22 And 24 Blacket Place, Including Boundary Walls				55°56′14″N 3°10′30″W	Category B	28314	Upload Photo
30 And 32 Blacket Place, Including Boundary Walls				55°56′12″N 3°10′31″W	Category B	28316	Upload Photo
34 And 36 Blacket Place, Including Boundary Walls				55°56′11″N 3°10′31″W	Category B	28317	Upload Photo
38, 40 And 42 Blacket Place, Including Boundary Walls				55°56′11″N 3°10′30″W	Category B	28318	Upload Photo
44 Blacket Place, Including Boundary Walls				55°56′10″N 3°10′29″W	Category B	28319	Upload Photo
5-9 (Odd Nos) Blackfriars Street				55°57′01″N 3°11′10″W	Category B	28321	Upload Photo
17-25 (Odd Nos) Blair Street				55°56′57″N 3°11′16″W	Category B	28331	Upload Photo
1-5 (Inclusive Nos) Blenheim Place Including Railings				55°57′27″N 3°11′03″W	Category A	28334	Upload Photo
6-10 (Inclusive Nos) Blenheim Place And 2 And 3 Greenside End Including Railings And Boundary Walls				55°57′27″N 3°10′59″W	Category A	28335	Upload Photo
Boswall Road St Columba's Hospice, Challenger Lodge (Original House, Garden Walls And Gatepiers)				55°58′48″N 3°12′46″W	Category B	28340	Upload Photo
Brandon Street 1-16 And 1-7A Eyre Place				55°57′41″N 3°12′04″W	Category B	28341	Upload Photo
Brandon Terrace 11-28				55°57′43″N 3°12′01″W	Category C(S)	28344	Upload Photo
28-36 (Even Nos) Bread Street, Point Hotel (Former St Cuthbert's Co-Operative Association Ltd)				55°56′44″N 3°12′13″W	Category A	28347	Upload another image
1-15 (Odd Nos) Broughton Place				55°57′30″N 3°11′21″W	Category B	28353	Upload Photo
19 Broughton Place And 15-19 (Odd Nos) Hart Street				55°57′31″N 3°11′17″W	Category B	28354	Upload Photo
4-12 (Even Nos) Broughton Place				55°57′32″N 3°11′22″W	Category A	28355	Upload Photo
2 East Broughton Place Including Boundary Wall And Railings				55°57′31″N 3°11′15″W	Category B	28356	Upload Photo
21-25 (Odd Nos) Broughton Street				55°57′26″N 3°11′16″W	Category B	28359	Upload Photo
14-22A (Even Nos) Broughton Street, Including Boundary Wall				55°57′26″N 3°11′19″W	Category B	28367	Upload Photo
7-17A (Odd Nos) Brunswick Street Including Railings				55°57′32″N 3°10′47″W	Category A	28371	Upload another image
15 And 16 North Bank Street, Balustraded Terrace To Front, Including Lamp Standards And Gates				55°57′00″N 3°11′40″W	Category B	28267	Upload Photo
9,11,13,15 Barnshot Road, With Boundary Wall And Gates				55°54′21″N 3°15′21″W	Category C(S)	28272	Upload Photo
1-8 (Inclusive Nos) Baxter's Place Including Railings				55°57′27″N 3°11′04″W	Category A	28279	Upload another image
1-21 (Inclusive Numbers) Belgrave Crescent, Including Railings				55°57′14″N 3°13′01″W	Category B	28281	Upload Photo
22-25 (Inclusive Numbers) Belgrave Crescent, Including Railings				55°57′13″N 3°13′11″W	Category B	28282	Upload Photo
1-10 (Inclusive Numbers) Belgrave Place				55°57′15″N 3°13′12″W	Category C(S)	28283	Upload Photo
1-11 (Inclusive Nos) Bellevue Crescent, Including Railings				55°57′36″N 3°11′34″W	Category A	28285	Upload Photo
15-27 (Inclusive Nos) Bellevue Crescent, And 5-9 (Odd Nos) Cornwallis Place, Including Railings				55°57′39″N 3°11′40″W	Category A	28286	Upload Photo
1-5 (Odd Nos) Bellevue Place Including Boundary Walls And Railings				55°57′38″N 3°11′32″W	Category B	28287	Upload Photo
21-35 (Odd Nos) Bellevue Place Including Boundary Walls				55°57′40″N 3°11′29″W	Category B	28290	Upload Photo
1-3 (Inclusive Nos) Bellevue Terrace				55°57′41″N 3°11′35″W	Category A	28291	Upload Photo
17 Bell's Brae, Hawthornbank Lane, Bell's Brae House				55°57′08″N 3°13′00″W	Category B	28294	Upload Photo
6-22 (Even Nos) Barony Street, And 2 Barony Place				55°57′30″N 3°11′25″W	Category B	28295	Upload Photo
23 And 25 Blacket Place, Including Boundary Walls				55°56′08″N 3°10′24″W	Category A	28306	Upload Photo
6 And 8 Blacket Place, Including Boundary Walls				55°56′15″N 3°10′25″W	Category B	28309	Upload Photo
1-11 (Inclusive Nos) Albyn Place, Including Railings, With 2-4 (Inclusive Nos) Wemyss Place Mews				55°57′13″N 3°12′25″W	Category A	28234	Upload Photo
6-26 (Even Numbers) Alva Street, Including Railings				55°57′02″N 3°12′37″W	Category A	28239	Upload Photo
Ann Street 49-51				55°57′20″N 3°12′45″W	Category B	28245	Upload Photo
Ann Street 4-14				55°57′25″N 3°12′48″W	Category A	28246	Upload Photo
Ann Street 16-42				55°57′23″N 3°12′45″W	Category A	28247	Upload another image
Ann Street 46-48				55°57′22″N 3°12′44″W	Category A	28249	Upload Photo
1-19 (Inclusive Nos) Annfield				55°58′47″N 3°11′21″W	Category C(S)	28256	Upload Photo
7-10 (Inclusive Nos) Antigua Street				55°57′30″N 3°11′06″W	Category B	28258	Upload Photo
1-22 (Inclusive Nos) Atholl Crescent, Including Railings, Lamp Standards And 9, 10, 13, 15, 18 And 20 Atholl Crescent Lane				55°56′52″N 3°12′42″W	Category A	28260	Upload another image
1-13 (Inclusive Nos) Atholl Place And 1 Torphichen Street, Including Railings				55°56′51″N 3°12′50″W	Category A	28261	Upload Photo
9 And 10 Swanston Village				55°53′32″N 3°13′01″W	Category B	28204	Upload another image
Abbey Strand, Eastern Building, 'Abbey Sanctuary'				55°57′10″N 3°10′26″W	Category A	28207	Upload another image
8 And 8A-20 (Inclusive Nos) Abercromby Place, And 1 And 3 Nelson Street, Including Railings And Lamps With Northumberland Place Lane And Dublin Meuse				55°57′24″N 3°11′45″W	Category A	28211	Upload Photo
21-34 (Inclusive Nos) Abercromby Place, And 2 Nelson Street And 1 And 1A Dundas Street, Including Coach House(1 Northumberland Street South East Lane), Railings And Lamps With Northumberland Street South East Lane				55°57′22″N 3°11′54″W	Category A	28212	Upload Photo
1-15B (Inclusive Nos) Ainslie Place, Including Railings				55°57′11″N 3°12′40″W	Category A	28213	Upload Photo
16-20 (Inclusive Nos) Ainslie Place, And 13-14 Glenfinlas Street, Including Railings And Lamps				55°57′10″N 3°12′37″W	Category A	28214	Upload another image
6, 6B Albany Street, Including Railings				55°57′26″N 3°11′35″W	Category B	28228	Upload Photo
18-40 (Even Nos) Albany Street, Including Ancillary Structures And Railings				55°57′26″N 3°11′31″W	Category A	28230	Upload Photo
42-44 (Even Nos) Albany Street, Including Railings				55°57′27″N 3°11′26″W	Category A	28231	Upload Photo
46-54 (Even Nos) Albany Street, Including Railings				55°57′27″N 3°11′25″W	Category B	28232	Upload Photo
St Catherine's 41, Howdenhall Road				55°54′12″N 3°09′53″W	Category B	28121	Upload Photo
Howdenhall Road, St Catherine's Gatelodge And Gatepiers				55°54′08″N 3°09′53″W	Category C(S)	28123	Upload Photo
Gilmerton, The Drum, Steading, Including Cottages, Dovecot, Screen Walls And Gamekeeper's Cottage				55°54′24″N 3°07′11″W	Category B	28136	Upload Photo
Drylaw House, Wester Drylaw Place And Ferry Road, Dovecot				55°57′59″N 3°15′08″W	Category C(S)	28137	Upload Photo
Gilmerton Road, Inch Dovecot				55°55′23″N 3°09′52″W	Category A	28140	Upload Photo
1 Bell's Mill, Belford Road, Former Bell's Mills Miller's House				55°57′00″N 3°13′23″W	Category B	28148	Upload Photo
Burdiehouse Limekilns, Near Burdiehouse Mains Farm				55°53′35″N 3°09′21″W	Category B	28159	Upload Photo
2, 4 Peffermill Road, Cameron Bank, Including Outbuildings And Boundary Walls				55°55′47″N 3°09′35″W	Category B	28163	Upload Photo
Liberton Drive, Tower House Stables, With Outbuildings, Gatepiers And Walls				55°54′52″N 3°10′37″W	Category B	28187	Upload Photo
5 Caroline Park, Caroline Park House Including Royston House				55°58′54″N 3°14′28″W	Category A	28040	Upload Photo
Colinton Road, Merchiston Castle School,				55°54′43″N 3°15′20″W	Category A	28042	Upload Photo
9 Loaning Road, Craigentinny House Including Boundary Walls With Pavilion End, Gatepiers And Garden Houses				55°57′36″N 3°08′48″W	Category B	28047	Upload Photo
35 And 37 Fernielaw Avenue, Fernielaw House With Washhouse, Privy, Boundary Walls And Gatepiers				55°54′02″N 3°15′51″W	Category B	28072	Upload Photo
Corstorphine High Street, And 1A Orchardfield Avenue, Dower House Including Boundary Walls, Gatepiers And Gates				55°56′25″N 3°17′02″W	Category B	28073	Upload Photo
Gilmerton, 89 Ravenscroft Street, Gazebo In Gardens				55°54′06″N 3°08′08″W	Category B	28075	Upload Photo
Inch House - Sundial Glenallan Drive Old Dalkeith Road And Gilmerton Road				55°55′31″N 3°09′30″W	Category B	28080	Upload Photo
60 Dreghorn Loan With Outbuilding And Arched Link-Wall				55°54′10″N 3°15′04″W	Category B	28085	Upload Photo
5 And 7 Regent Road, Former Royal High School, Including Lodge, Classroom Block, Retaining/ Boundary Walls, Gateposts And Railings				55°57′12″N 3°10′52″W	Category A	27987	Upload another image
Drummond Street, University Of Edinburgh, Geography Department, (Former Surgical Hospital), Including Railings And Lamp Standards				55°56′54″N 3°11′02″W	Category B	28000	Upload another image

== Key ==
The scheme for classifying buildings in Scotland is:

- Category A: "buildings of national or international importance, either architectural or historic; or fine, little-altered examples of some particular period, style or building type."
- Category B: "buildings of regional or more than local importance; or major examples of some particular period, style or building type, which may have been altered."
- Category C: "buildings of local importance; lesser examples of any period, style, or building type, as originally constructed or moderately altered; and simple traditional buildings which group well with other listed buildings."

In March 2016 there were 47,288 listed buildings in Scotland. Of these, 8% were Category A, and 50% were Category B, with the remaining 42% being Category C.

== See also ==
- List of listed buildings in Edinburgh
