= Virgin Hotels Las Vegas =

Casino hotel in Las Vegas

Virgin Hotels Las Vegas, Curio Collection by Hilton
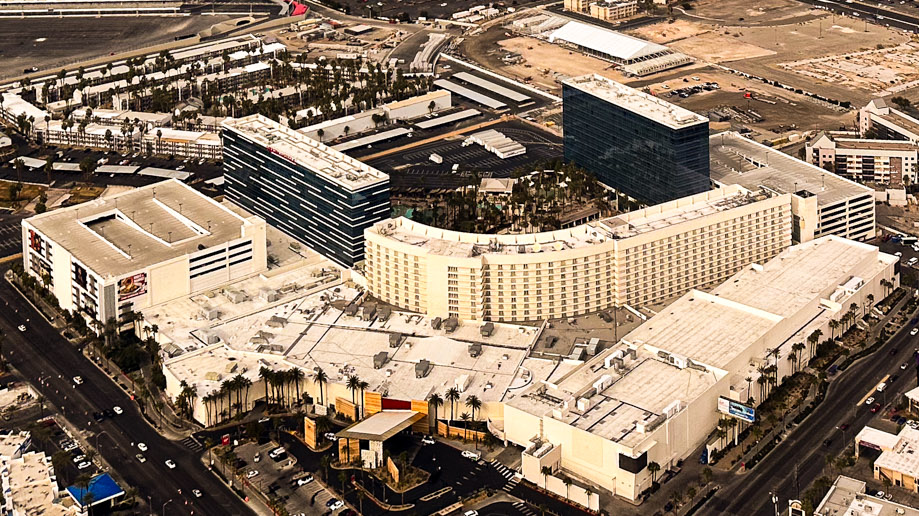
- Aerial view of the property in January 2024
- Interactive map of Virgin Hotels Las Vegas, Curio Collection by Hilton
- Location: Paradise, Nevada; 4455 Paradise Road; 36°06′31″N 115°09′13″W
- Opened: March 25, 2021; 5 years ago
- No. of rooms: 1,504
- Gaming space: 60,000 sq ft (5,600 m^{2})
- Signature attractions: The Theater at Virgin Hotels
- Notable restaurants: Nobu; Olives (2021–2023); One Steakhouse
- Casino type: Land-based
- Owner: JC Hospitality; Virgin Hotels
- Previous names: Hard Rock Hotel & Casino (1995–2020)
- Website: virginhotelslv.com

Virgin Hotels Las Vegas, Curio Collection by Hilton is a casino hotel resort in Paradise, Nevada, east of the Las Vegas Strip. The hotel, part of the Curio Collection by Hilton, includes 1,504 rooms. The casino is 60,000 sq ft (5,600 m^{2}) and was originally operated by a subsidiary of the Mohegan Tribe, making it the first Native American tribe to operate a Las Vegas casino. The resort also includes music venue The Theater at Virgin Hotels.

Virgin Hotels Las Vegas previously operated as the Hard Rock Hotel & Casino, which opened in 1995. Virgin Hotels and a group of investment companies purchased the Hard Rock in March 2018, for $500 million. Richard Branson, the founder of Virgin Group, had wanted to enter the Las Vegas casino industry for more than 20 years. The Hard Rock closed on February 3, 2020, to allow for a $200 million renovation. The resort reopened under the new Virgin Hotels Las Vegas branding on March 25, 2021, after being delayed more than four months due to the COVID-19 pandemic in Nevada. The casino struggled under Mohegan, which exited the property in early 2025, with management transferring to Virgin Hotels Las Vegas.

== History ==
=== Background ===
The resort originally opened in March 1995, as the Hard Rock Hotel & Casino. In January 2018, majority owner Brookfield Asset Management was in discussions to sell the Hard Rock to a group of buyers, including Virgin Hotels, Bosworth Hospitality, and investment firm Juniper Capital Partners. The three companies had partnered together a year earlier to begin looking for an existing casino resort property in Las Vegas. The Hard Rock Hotel sale was finalized on March 30, 2018. On the same day, Virgin Group founder Richard Branson hosted a party-like news conference at the Hard Rock pool, announcing that the resort would be renovated and rebranded as Virgin Hotels Las Vegas by the end of 2019. The resort would retain the Hard Rock name until the completion of renovations, which would be done in phases, allowing the property to remain partially open.

For more than 20 years, Branson had wanted to get into the Las Vegas casino industry. At the time of the purchase, the company operated one hotel, the Virgin Hotels Chicago, and there were plans to add approximately 10 more hotels. With around 1,500 hotel rooms, the Hard Rock was the largest property of Virgin's hotels, but it was also small compared to resorts on the nearby Las Vegas Strip. The resort fit Virgin Hotels' desire for a smaller, boutique hotel in the Las Vegas market. The newly renovated resort would compete against newer hotels such as Cosmopolitan of Las Vegas, Delano, and NoMad.

Richard Bosworth was named as the new chief executive officer of the resort. Bosworth and Juniper Capital were longtime business partners. The two had previously wanted to purchase the unfinished Fontainebleau resort in Las Vegas, and they approached Brookfield as a possible equity partner in early 2017. Plans to buy the Fontainebleau did not work out, and Bosworth and Juniper Capital ultimately began discussions with Brookfield about buying the Hard Rock instead. The resort was purchased for $500 million, in part with a $200 million loan from JPMorgan Chase. Ownership was split between seven investment companies, four of them being Canadian. The majority owner was Laborers' International Union of North America's Central and Eastern Canada Pension Fund, which contributed more than $100 million to the purchase of the Hard Rock. By January 2019, JC Hospitality had become the majority owner of the resort. It is a joint venture of Bosworth Hospitality, Juniper Capital, and Virgin. It was led by president and CEO Bosworth, and by Virgin Hotels, the latter of which would manage the resort following renovations.

Base Entertainment had been building a stage facility on the property to host The Voice: Neon Dreams, a live concert show. Base Entertainment pulled out of the project following the Virgin purchase, leaving the facility only partially built.

=== Design and renovations ===
Virgin Hotels Las Vegas has a desert oasis theme. The design phase was underway in June 2018. Renovation work was originally scheduled to begin and end in 2019, but the amount of work was increased as additional improvements were deemed necessary. During the first year of ownership, Bosworth and the other owners observed how the Hard Rock operated, which helped them in their renovation plans. The design changes increased the cost of renovations from $150 million to $200 million. In April 2019, it was announced that the renovation project would now begin in February 2020, with a grand opening celebration at the end of the year. Design work was nearly finished at the time of the announcement. The design team included Klai Juba Wald Architecture + Interiors, Rockwell Group, and Studio Collective. McCarthy Building Companies and Taylor International Corporation were selected as the general contractors.

It was announced in August 2019 that the Hard Rock would close entirely for about eight months beginning in early February 2020, to allow for the renovations to take place. Although there were initially plans to keep the resort partially open during renovations, Bosworth said, "We determined that a phased closing of four months, followed by a total closure of four months was not efficient from a construction process nor could we provide a hospitality service experience our guests deserve." The former Hard Rock Cafe restaurant, located on-site, was demolished in November 2019 to make room for valet parking and ride-sharing vehicles. The Hard Rock Hotel & Casino closed on February 3, 2020, allowing for renovations to begin.

=== Opening and early years ===
In 2019, a grand opening celebration was planned for mid-November 2020, shortly after the U.S. presidential election. The opening date was chosen to increase publicity for the resort, as Bosworth felt that the opening would be overshadowed if it were to occur during the presidential campaign season. The resort was later scheduled to open on November 6, 2020. Construction remained on track despite the COVID-19 pandemic and its effects on the state. However, Bosworth announced in August 2020 that the opening could be delayed because of the pandemic, which had resulted in poor economic conditions. The pandemic had also imposed restrictive health precautions such as limited customer visitation.

In September 2020, Bosworth announced a new opening date of January 15, 2021, as the owners wanted to ensure that pandemic conditions and restrictions continued to improve. Six weeks before the resort's scheduled opening, JC Hospitality delayed it again, due to the pandemic. In Nevada, casino occupancy levels had been reduced to 25 percent due to a rise in COVID-19 cases. Bosworth said that under these conditions, the resort would not have been profitable had it proceeded with the January opening.

Virgin Hotels Las Vegas eventually opened on the night of March 25, 2021, with a 40-minute opening ceremony that included bagpipe players and a drumline. Attendees to the opening included Mario Lopez, Jon Gruden and Dana White. Branson did not attend the opening due to concerns about the pandemic. By the time of its opening, casino occupancy levels had been increased to 50 percent. Because of the pandemic restrictions, the resort had a low-key opening. An official grand opening celebration was expected to take place at a later date. Certain amenities, including some restaurants and a small sportsbook, were not ready with the initial opening.

After COVID-19 restrictions were eased, the resort held a grand opening weekend celebration from June 10–13, 2021, marking the completion of nearly all facilities. Attendees at the grand opening included Branson, Nevada governor Steve Sisolak, and singer Christina Aguilera, who performed in the property's renovated theater. The resort's target demographic consists of people ages 25 to 48. To attract guests, the property opened without resort fees and paid parking, both of which had become common in Las Vegas. It also offers free Wi-Fi. A nightly resort fee was soon implemented, less than a year after opening.

The resort includes approximately 1,300 former Hard Rock employees, making up the majority of the workforce. Bosworth had sought to retain the Hard Rock's 1,850 employees after its closure, through a program that would give them a paycheck bonus if they returned for the opening of Virgin Hotels. The resort also signed a three-year extension to continue hosting the AVN Adult Entertainment Expo, although the 2021 expo was cancelled as an in-person event due to the pandemic.

Bosworth stepped down as president in 2023, but retained an ownership stake. Virgin Hotels Las Vegas curated programming and managed operations for attendees in the East Harmon Zone of the 2023 Las Vegas Grand Prix, through an event partnership with Formula One Racing. In 2024, a tunnel was drilled to the resort for a future station of the Las Vegas Loop, an underground transportation system.

==== Worker strike ====
Workers at Virgin Hotels Las Vegas, who are represented by the Culinary Workers Union, had their labor contract expire in June 2023. Culinary held a 48-hour strike at the resort in May 2024, noting that more than 50,000 union employees at other Las Vegas resorts had won "historic" pay raises. Despite continued protests, Virgin Las Vegas was still without a new labor contract in September 2024. By that time, all casino resorts on the nearby Strip had been unionized and had labor contracts, leaving Virgin as the only outlier in the Las Vegas Valley.

On November 15, 2024, 700 workers at the resort began a strike for more workplace protections and higher wages. Unlike the 48-hour strike earlier in the year, this one was open ended and would last until the signing of a new labor deal, with employees picketing 24/7 outside the hotel. It was Culinary's first open ended strike in Las Vegas since 2002. Virgins Hotels Las Vegas remained operational by hiring hundreds of temporary workers, allowing it to stay open during the 2024 Las Vegas Grand Prix, which was held a week after the strike began. The use of civil disobedience was allowed starting on the first day of the grand prix, with 57 people arrested.

On December 3, 2024, resort management reported that the property was now in financial distress, criticizing the Culinary Union's demands. Management also reported that 60% of its union employees were working at the resort again. A day later, all 700 striking workers held a public meeting with the Las Vegas-based Nevada Gaming Control Board. A new, five-year contract was reached in January 2025, putting an end to the two-month strike.

== Features ==
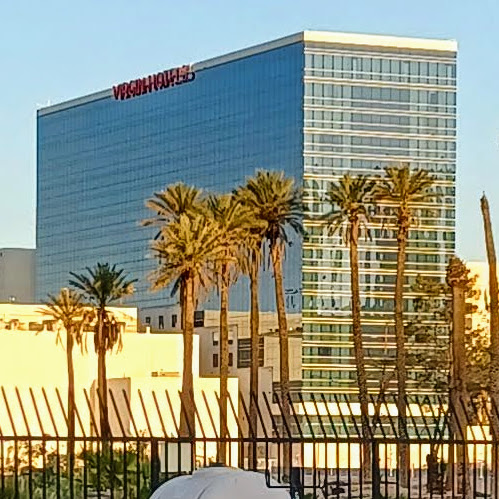
The Opal Tower at Virgin Hotels

Virgin Hotels Las Vegas opened with a 60,000 sq ft (5,600 m^{2}) casino, originally branded separately as Mohegan Sun Casino. It was renamed Mohegan Casino Las Vegas in September 2022. It was operated by Mohegan Gaming and Entertainment, a subsidiary of the Mohegan Tribe, making it the first Native American tribe to operate a Las Vegas casino. It struggled under Mohegan's management, and the tribe ended its affiliation with the property in early 2025. Casino operations were transferred to the property's top two executives.

The casino has 44 table games, as well as 650 slot machines; half of the slots are from the former Hard Rock. A sportsbook, operated by Betfred, opened in February 2023, after delays caused by the Nevada licensing process.

The hotel has 1,504 rooms and suites, spread across three buildings: the Canyon Tower, Opal Tower, and Ruby Tower. The Ruby Tower is an all-suite building. A mobile app serves as an optional room key and also allows guests to order room service or check out. In addition, the app allows guests to control lights, televisions, and thermostats in their rooms. The hotel is part of Hilton's Curio Collection.

The resort also has 110,000 sq ft (10,000 m^{2}) of meeting and event space. Other amenities include a fitness center and spa.

=== Entertainment ===
Virgin Hotels intended to revive the former Hard Rock's reputation as a top destination for entertainment. The Joint, a Hard Rock music venue, was renovated into The Theater at Virgin Hotels. Because of the pandemic, the venue did not open until September 2021.

Vinyl, another music venue at the Hard Rock, was renamed 24 Oxford, after the first Virgin Records store, which was located at 24 Oxford Street in London. JC Hospitality spent $500,000 to revamp the Vinyl space. The venue opened in May 2021, hosting the "27" residency, which is dedicated to members of the 27 Club.

The resort's 5-acre (2.0 ha) pool area is surrounded by several restaurants and an event lawn to host live concerts. The event lawn space was previously home to a separate pool area, which hosted the Hard Rock's Rehab pool parties. This pool area was buried beneath the new event lawn, which has space for 1,800 people. Élia Beach Club is an outdoor, two-story dayclub, separate from the pool area. It features DJs and electronic dance music, and was opened in June 2021.

=== Restaurants and bars ===
The resort features 12 restaurants and bars. Like other Virgin hotels, the Las Vegas property includes the Commons Club, an upscale restaurant and lounge area built at the resort's main entrance. The Commons Club measures 8,500 sq ft (790 m^{2}) and includes The Bar and The Shag Room, two lounges located adjacent to one another. Both will offer live entertainment, and The Shag Room will also be booked for private events.

The resort also includes a Thai restaurant named Night + Market, and the Funny Library Coffee Shop. Hakkasan Group operates Casa Calavera, a cantina offering food and drinks. Kassi Beach House, an Italian poolside restaurant, opened in May 2021. Olives, a Mediterranean restaurant by chef Todd English, opened three months later. It operated until 2023.

"Money, Baby!", a sportsbook lounge and restaurant, debuted in June 2021. It was a multi-level space with 15,000 sq ft (1,400 m^{2}), replacing the Hard Rock's former Vanity nightclub. Money, Baby! operated in lieu of the resort's primary sportsbook, which had yet to open. The restaurant portion was overseen by chef Beau MacMillan. Money, Baby! closed abruptly in 2022, with subsequent litigation ensuing between its parent, Clive Collective, and Virgin. That October, the former sportsbook lounge reopened as Skybox.

Virgin Hotels Las Vegas retained the Nobu restaurant, which previously operated inside the resort when it was the Hard Rock. Nobu is a Michelin star restaurant, and is operated by chef Nobu Matsuhisa. Two other Hard Rock restaurants, MB Steak and Forte Pizza, were also retained. MB Steak, owned by David and Michael Morton, received a $1.5 million expansion, and was renamed One Steakhouse. Nobu was also expanded.
