= Cowgate =

Street in Edinburgh, Scotland

Coordinates: 55°56′55″N 3°11′18″W

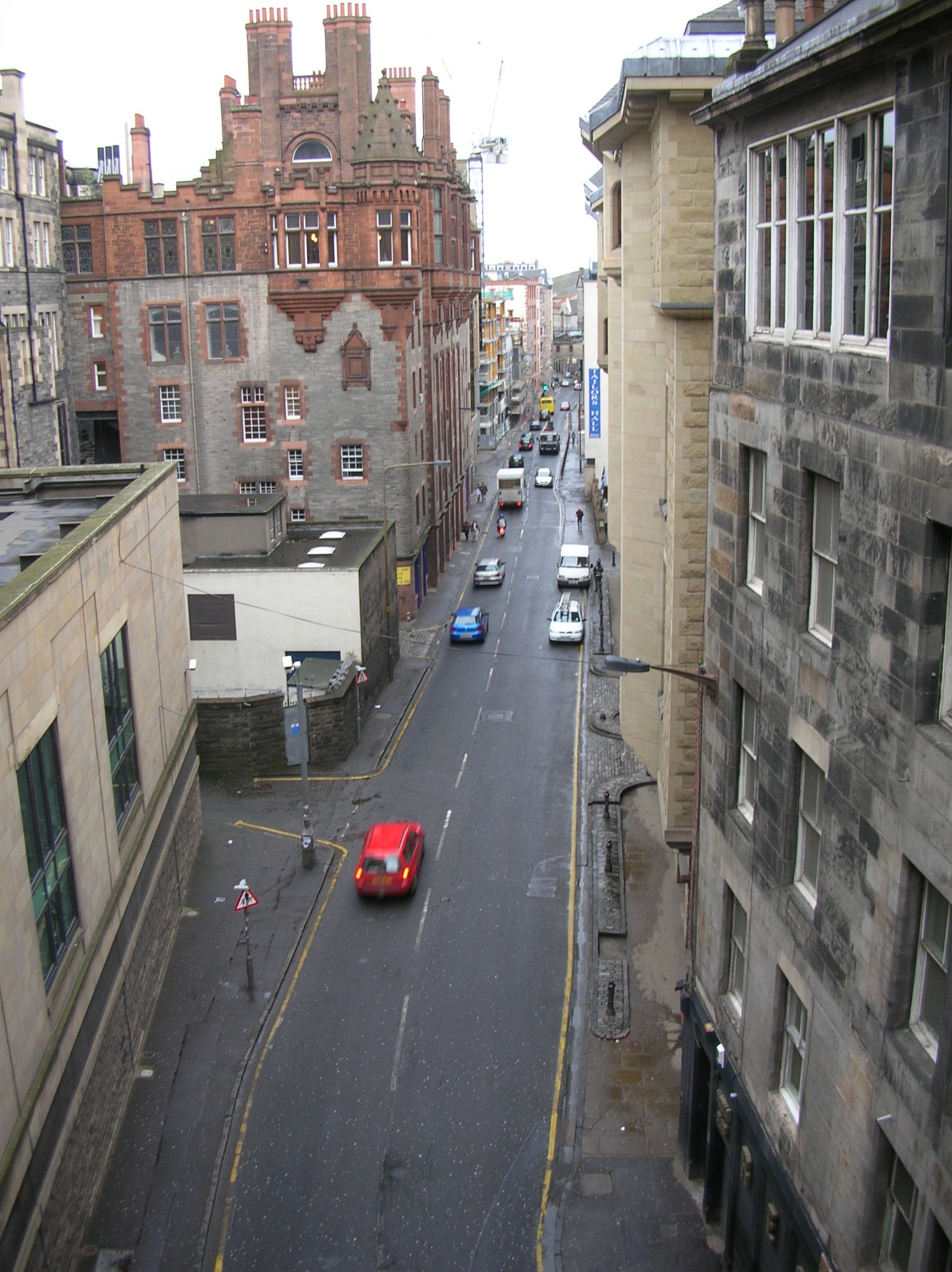
- The Cowgate, viewed from George IV Bridge
- Interactive map of Cowgate
- Native name: Cougait (Scots)
- Length: 0.4 mi (0.64 km)
- Location: Edinburgh, Scotland
- Postal code: EH1
- West end: Candlemaker Row
- East end: The Pleasance

The Cowgate (Scots: The Cougait) is a street in Edinburgh, Scotland, located about 550 yards (500 m) southeast of Edinburgh Castle, within the city's World Heritage Site. The street is part of the lower level of Edinburgh's Old Town, which lies below the elevated streets of South Bridge and George IV Bridge. It meets the Grassmarket at Cowgatehead at its west end and Holyrood Road to the east.

== History ==
=== Early history ===
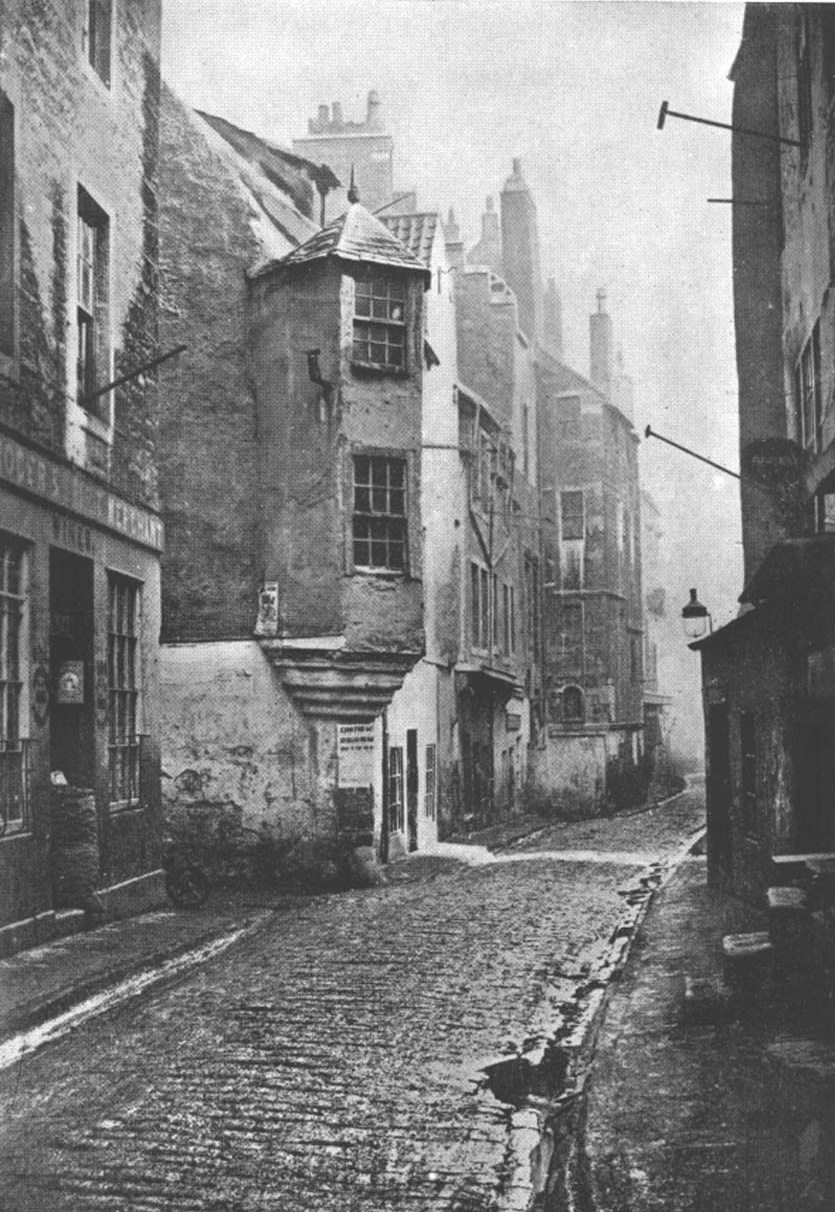
Cowgate and Cardinal Beaton's lodging in 1868

The Cowgate developed around 1330 and represented Edinburgh’s first municipal extension. The original settlement on the Cowgate was concentrated on the south side because of a burn on the north, though that was filled in around 1490 and built upon. Archaeological excavations in 2006 and 2007 found a boundary ditch, dating to the 14th century, near St Patrick's Church which might have been the full extent of the Cowgate at that time.

The street's name is recorded from 1428, in various spellings, as Cowgate and in 1498 as Via Vaccarum. It is derived from the medieval practice of herding cattle down the street on market days; a number of other streets in the old town of Edinburgh (such as Grassmarket and Lawnmarket) also reflect their market roots. Gate is a Scots language word for "way" or "road", a cognate of similar words in other Germanic languages (compare with gait).

Cowgate Port, a gatehouse in the city wall, was erected in 1516 and stood at the junction with St Mary’s Wynd. Describing the street in the 1581 edition of their atlas of major cities Civitates orbis terrarum, Georg Braun and Frans Hogenberg said the Cow Gate was where "...the noble families and city councillors have their residences, together with other princely houses and palaces most handsome to behold."

James Beaton, Archbishop of St Andrews, built a lodging with a corner turret in the Cowgate at the foot of Blackfriars Wynd. It was used by his nephew David Beaton, and became known as Cardinal Beaton's House. It was demolished in 1877. After the Scottish Reformation, the lodging passed to Archibald Stewart, a Provost of Edinburgh, and from 1581 became part of the royal mint.

Mary, Queen of Scots, stayed for a time in 1566 in a Cowgate house where the Court of the Exchequer met. The Exchequer Rolls mention that she and her nobles were provided with wine, bread, beer, meat fish, spices, pewter, and napkins. After her abdication, her enemies and George Buchanan described her visits to the Earl of Bothwell in an adjacent house, facilitated by Margaret Beaton, Lady Reres.

Between the mid 18th and mid 20th centuries the Cowgate was a poor, often overcrowded slum area. In the 19th century it was home to much of the city's Irish immigrant community and nicknamed "Little Ireland".

=== 2002 fire and modern history ===
South Bridge closed after the Cowgate fire in 2002

In the evening of 7 December 2002, a fire started above the Belle Angele nightclub off the Cowgate. It swept up through the eight storey structure to other buildings on Cowgate and above it on South Bridge. The complicated nature of the buildings, with narrow alleys and entrances from the same building onto streets at different heights, complicated efforts to fight the fire, and was later called a "rabbit warren" by Lothian and Borders Fire Brigade. It took more than a day for the fire, fought at its height by 19 fire crews, to be brought under control, and several days for it to be completely extinguished. 150 people were forced to flee the flames, but there were no deaths.

The University of Edinburgh School of Informatics on South Bridge was badly damaged; the school was a pioneer in the study of artificial intelligence in the 1950s and one of the world's most comprehensive archival libraries in this field was destroyed by the fire. Little current research data was lost in the fire due to offsite backups. In 2005 work began on a new building, the Informatics Forum, which was occupied mid-2008.

Also destroyed was the Gilded Balloon, a major venue for the Edinburgh Fringe, and offices for both the Gilded Balloon and Underbelly venues housed in an 1823 listed warehouse by Thomas Hamilton. The Gilded Balloon later moved to premises in Teviot Row House.

The site was temporarily used as a Fringe venue again when it became the C venues' Urban Garden during the 2007 Edinburgh Festival.

The owners and displaced tenants together with Edinburgh City appointed McGregor CS to act as lead to piece together the interests so that the site could be redeveloped. The site was then marketed widely and six developers were shortlisted. The gap site was then acquired by the property developer Whiteburn, who were granted planning permission in January 2009 to build a new mixed-use development using the site and existing adjacent buildings. Construction began in 2012 and was completed in late 2013. The main components of the development are a small Sainsbury's supermarket, a 259-bed Ibis Hotel, shops, restaurants, a nightclub and a vennel.

In 2016, protesters (including local homeless people) camped out in Cowgate to prevent the building of luxury hotel by Jansons Property. The protesters argued that the development might damage Edinburgh's UNESCO status, would displace homeless people, would remove a medical facility for the homeless and would block the natural light of the Edinburgh Central Library. MSP Andy Wightman offered his support to the campaign. Planning permission for the Virgin Hotel, which includes the India Buildings on Victoria Street and a facade on Cowgate, was granted in 2016. However, in 2018 councillors asked that developers use light coloured materials to reflect more light into the Central Library.

On 2 November 2024 a severed head was discovered in the Cowgate. The head is believed to be that of a 74 year old man who had been hit by a bus. Police were called around 7:25 PM, closed off the area, blocked the view of the scene from the South Bridge and evacuated the nearby pubs.

== Buildings ==
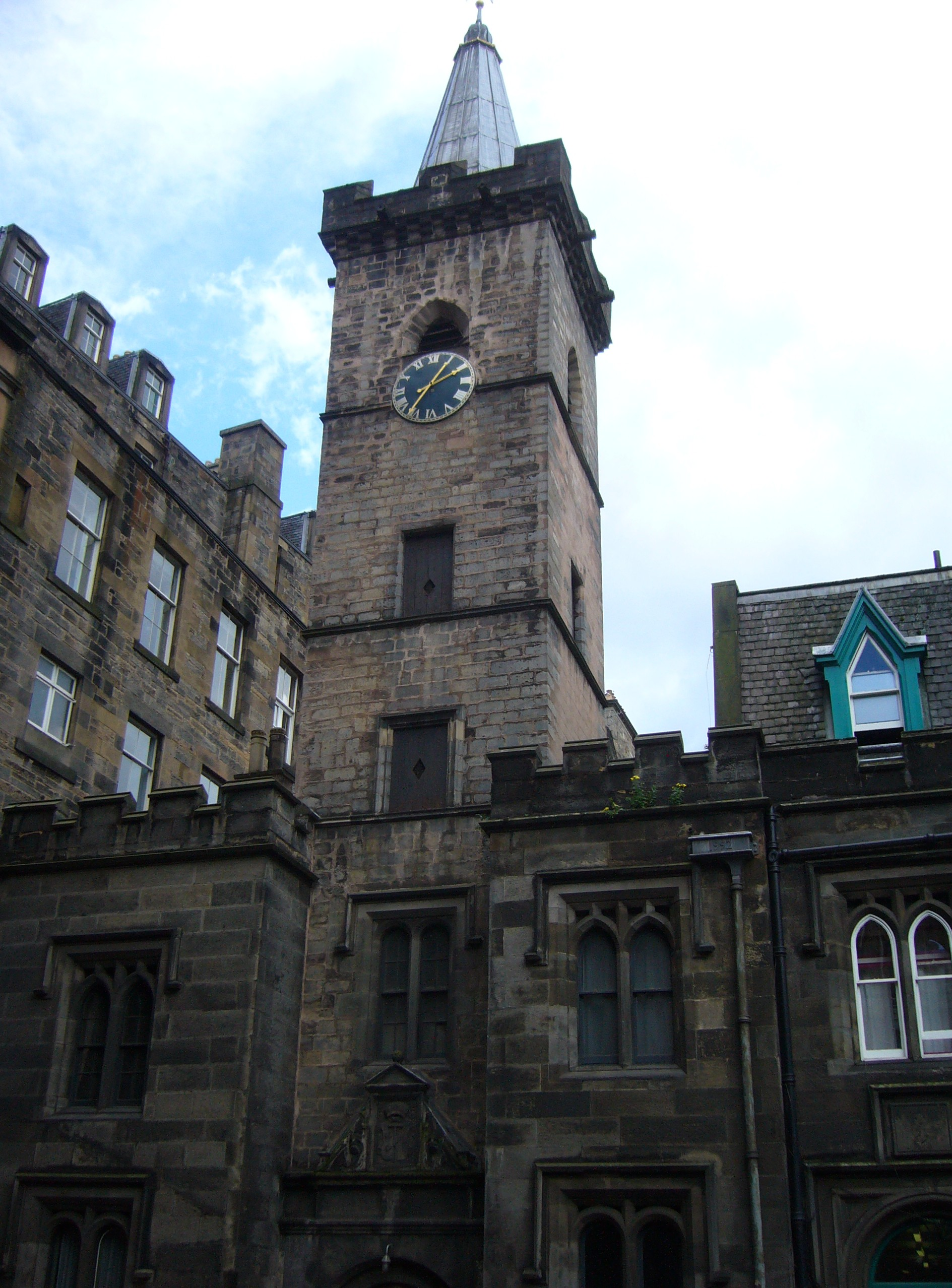
Magdalen Chapel in the Cowgate

The oldest building lies to the west end, but is sandwiched between other larger buildings and easily missed. It stands on the south side of the street, just west of where George IV Bridge crosses over the Cowgate. This is the Magdalen Chapel, a 16th-century almshouse chapel built with monies left by Michael MacQueen in 1537. Work was completed in 1544 and it operated as a hospital almshouse (dedicated to Mary Magdalen) under the control of MacQueen's widow, Janet Rynd until her death in 1553, when it passed to the Incorporation of Hammermen (metalworkers). The entrance as seen from the Cowgate was rebuilt in 1613. The spire was added in 1620.

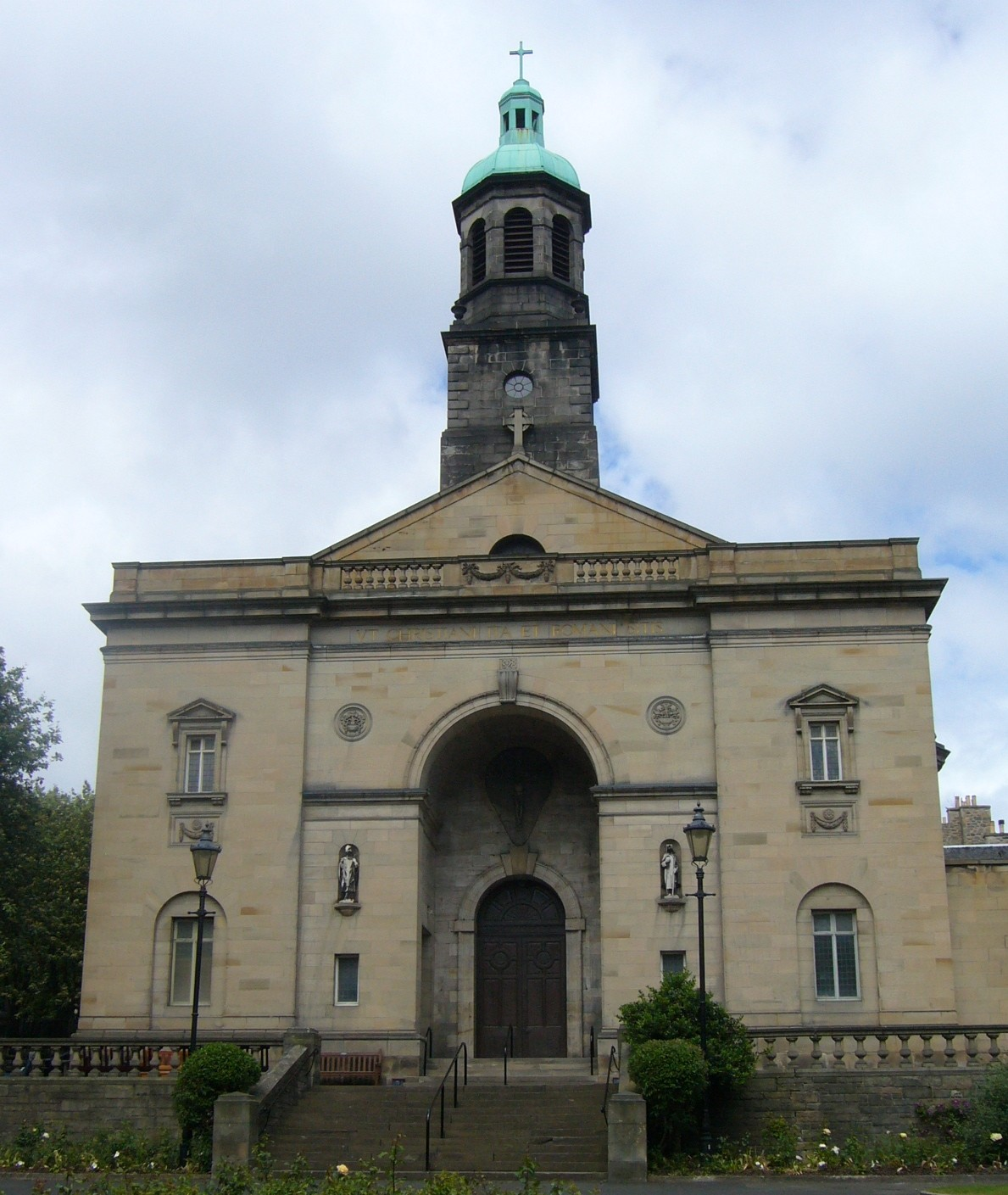
St Patrick's Roman Catholic Church

St Cecilia's Hall by Robert Mylne was built for the Musical Society of Edinburgh in 1763. It now houses a small Georgian concert space and an important collection of early keyboard instruments owned by Edinburgh University.

St Patrick's Roman Catholic Church stands at the east end of the Cowgate. It dates from 1772 but was extensively remodelled in 1929 following demolition of the tenements along the north side of the Cowgate which previously obscured its frontage.

The former Cowgatehead Free Church is located at the western end of Cowgate. It was built in 1861 in the Gothic style, and has an octagonal entrance tower. By 2000 it was no longer in use as a church, and was later incorporated as part of the Virgin Hotel.

Both the National Library of Scotland and the Edinburgh Central Library have their lower floors on the Cowgate, with public access being on George IV Bridge above.

== Notable people ==
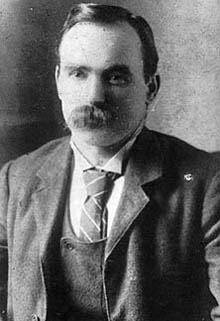
James Connolly, an Irish socialist leader who was born in Cowgate

- Janet Boyman, executed for witchcraft on 29 December 1572; court documents record her home as the Cowgate.
- James Connolly, Irish revolutionary was born in 1868 at number 107 Cowgate. In Cowgate there is a likeness of Connolly and a gold-coloured plaque dedicated to him under the George IV bridge.
- Football club Hibernian F.C. was founded by congregants of St Patrick's Roman Catholic Church in the Cowgate in August 1875 – the club was based at St Patrick's until the early 1890s, and cups the club won from this period are still displayed in the church.
- Canon John Gray, poet and priest was a curate at St Patrick's.
- Venerable Margaret Sinclair lived at Blackfriars Street, just off the Cowgate.

== Cowgatehead ==
The road, Cowgate, continues west as Cowgatehead, at Candlemaker Row, until West Bow, and then continues west as Grassmarket.

The venue, referred to as Cowgatehead, is at 65 Cowgate.

== See also ==
- George IV Bridge
