= Paul Gollash =

American entrepreneur and business executive

- Born: Milwaukee, Wisconsin
- Education: Dartmouth College; University of Chicago Booth School of Business
- Occupations: Founder and CEO, Voxy

Paul Gollash is an American entrepreneur and business executive. He is the CEO and founder of Voxy, a language-learning platform that uses mobile and web technology to teach English as a second language. He is currently based in New York City.

== Early life ==
Gollash is from Milwaukee, Wisconsin. He studied at Dartmouth College where he received his BA in economics in 1997. At 22, he graduated from college and moved to Santiago, Chile.

== Career ==
Gollash traveled to Chile to learn Spanish and begin an import/export company. When he was 24, he moved to Madrid to work for Opel, a subset of General Motors Europe, where he sold car parts and established auto repair shops in Spain, Portugal, and other parts of southern Europe.

After his time in Madrid, Gollash returned to the United States to attend The University of Chicago-Booth School of Business. He received his MBA with Honors in 2004. He then worked as a management consultant at Booz Allen Hamilton for a short time before he left to work for Virgin Group. During his time there, he helped conceive, raise funding for, and launch Virgin Hotels.

Gollash co-founded Voxy with Gregg Carey in September 2010. He serves as the company's chief executive officer and lead spokesperson. The concept for Voxy was based on Gollash's experiences of learning a second language and his ideas about engaging language learners with real-world content. At the 2010 TechCrunch Disrupt conference, Gollash pitched Voxy in front of a panel that included Sean Parker, Greg Tseng, James Slavet, and Victoria Ransom. Since then, Voxy has received a total of $20.4 million in funding.

== Personal life ==
In May 2015, Gollash married Maria Cabo. They have a daughter, Greta.

== See also ==
- Voxy
- Virgin Hotels
