= Voxy =

Educational technology company

- Type: Private
- Industry: E-Learning
- Founded: 2010
- Headquarters: New York, NY
- Key people: Paul Gollash, Founder & CEO Gregg Carey, Co-founder Katharine Nielson, PhD., Chief Education Officer
- Website: www.voxy.com

Voxy is an American eLearning company and English learning platform. The company was founded in February 2010 by Gregg Carey and Paul Gollash and is headquartered in New York City along with an office in São Paulo, Brazil.

== History ==
Voxy officially launched at TechCrunch Disrupt 2010 in San Francisco. The executive chairman of the Voxy board is Timothy Murray. PhD linguist Katharine B. Nielson is the chief education officer. In 2014, after receiving increased interest in the Voxy platform from several universities, Voxy expanded its offerings to corporations and educational institutions. Voxy software is used by universities, language institutes, and corporations in countries including Brazil, Mexico, Colombia, the United States, Argentina, Vietnam, Taiwan, Saudi Arabia, Russia, Italy and Spain.

In 2013, Voxy partnered with Pearson PLC to expand to more countries, including China. The company developed an online English course for Internet multinational Terra Networks.

Voxy's biggest market is Brazil. Prior to the 2014 World Cup in Brazil, Voxy distributed its English language-learning platform to 40,000 affiliates of the car service 99Taxis.

In 2014, Voxy announced a partnership with Brothers For All, a South African nonprofit dedicated to providing educational support to ex-inmates of the South African prison system and at-risk youth. Voxy donated free software licenses to the new Brothers For All study center in Langa, South Africa, giving students in an underserved community full access to Voxy's platform and credits to enroll in live group classes.

In December 2015, Voxy received a patent for its customized keyword extraction process for second language learning.

== Product ==
Voxy uses task-based language learning and tailors courses based on learners’ performance and interests. The curriculum uses relevant content such as up-to-date news and conversations.

The platform includes live instruction through one-on-one tutoring sessions and group classes with certified teachers.

== Funding ==
In its Series A round, Voxy received $4.1 million in funding from investors including Weld North, New York City Investment Fund (NYCIF), Seavest Inc., Contour Venture Partners, and ff Venture Capital.

Voxy received $2.3 million in funding from return investors including ff Venture Capital, Contour Venture Partners, and Seavest Capital Partners in a Series A-2 round in 2012.

In 2013, Voxy received $8.5 million from Pearson in a Series B with participation from Rethink Education. Voxy raised $12 million worth of funding in March 2017, which was dedicated to the expansion of its e-learning app. The funding round was led by SFJ Ventures.

== Awards and recognition ==
Business Insider named Voxy one of the 10 best U.S. technology companies to work for in 2012, and Internet Week New York named Voxy one of the top 30 places to work in the New York City tech industry in 2014.

In 2015, Voxy was recognized as an Academics' Choice Award Winner for "Smart Media."

== See also ==
- Distance learning
- E-Learning
- Language education
- English as a second language
- Second language acquisition
- List of language self-study programs
