= Richard Baptist O'Brien =

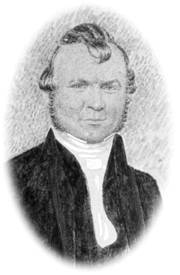
Richard Baptist O'Brien, St. Mary's President 1840-45

Richard Baptist O'Brien (1809–1885) was an Irish Roman Catholic priest, author and advocate of Irish home rule.

== Biography ==
Born in Carrick-on-Suir, County Tipperary O'Brien became a Home Ruler nationalist and an anti-liberal ultramontanist fashioned after Pope Pius IX. At the age of two when his father died his mother sold the family grocery business and they moved to Limerick. He was educated locally at St. Marys in Limerick, and at Knockbeg college, Carlow. He studied for the priesthood in Maynooth College graduating with distinction, he was ordained then in 1839.

In 1849 he founded the Catholic Young Men's Society in order to help Catholics advance their area of religious interests. O'Brien was president of Saint Mary's College, in Halifax, Nova Scotia, Canada from 1840 to 1845.

He taught for a time in All Hallows College, Dublin, initially from 1845 to 1847 teaching English and French, and returning to teach in All Hallows from 1853 until 1858, his nephew Edward Joseph Hannan who trained as a priest in All Hallows during his second period there, served as a priest in Scotland, founding Hibernian F.C. along with members of the local CYMS.

He is buried in Newcastle West.

== Works ==
As a writer O'Brien contributed to The Irish Catholic Magazine, the Irish Monthly and The Nation. He also wrote novels, often portraying moral dilemmas.
