= St Patrick's Church, Edinburgh =

St Patrick's Church
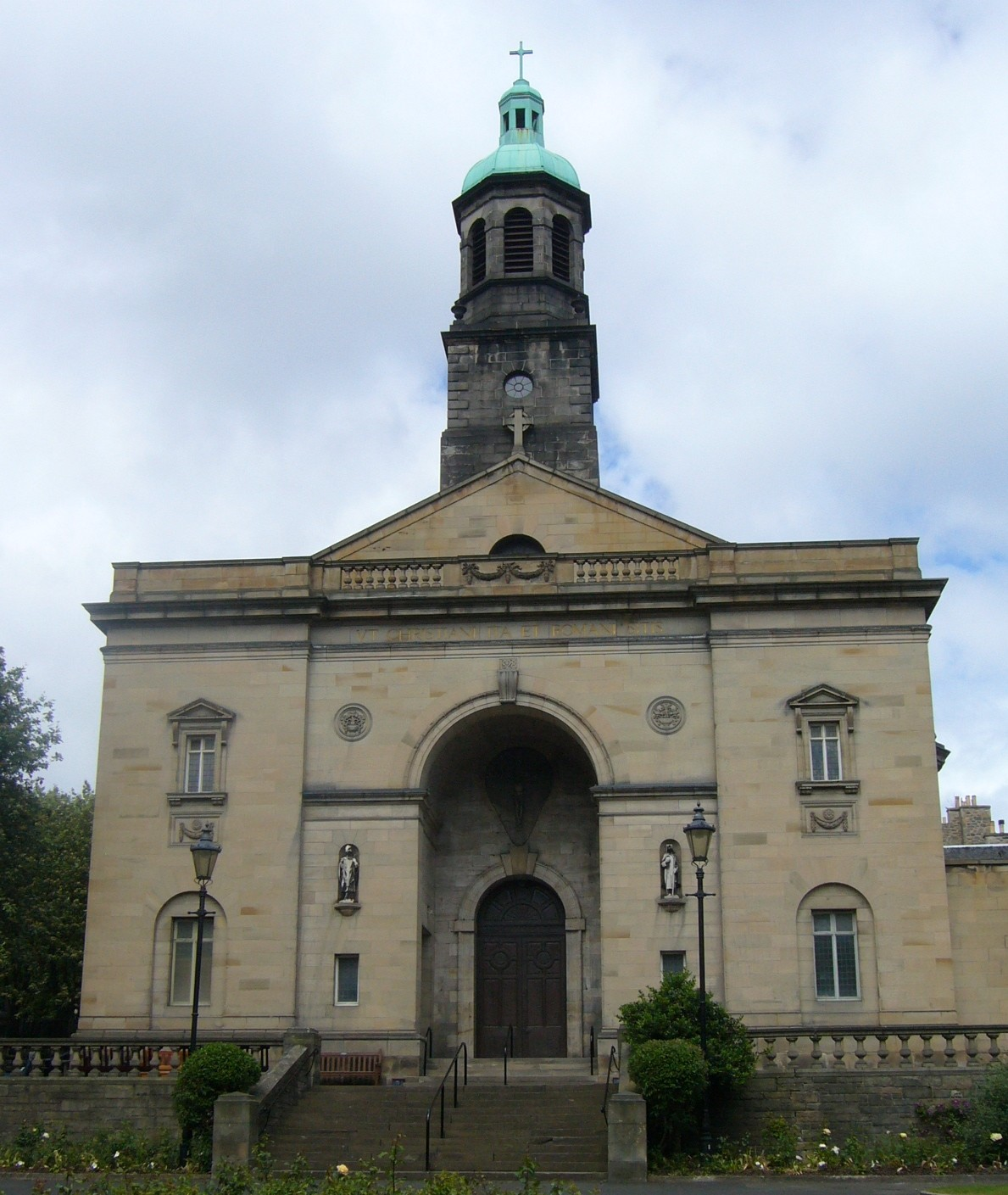

- Location in Edinburgh
- 55.9498°N 3.1846°W
- Location: Old Town, Edinburgh
- Country: Scotland
- Denomination: Roman Catholic
- Website: St Patrick's Parish, Edinburgh

History
- Status: Parish church
- Dedication: Saint Patrick
- Events: Facade added in 1929

Architecture
- Functional status: Active
- Heritage designation: Category B listed
- Designated: 14 December 1970
- Architect(s): John Baxter, James Graham Fairley and Reginald Fairlie
- Style: Neoclassical
- Groundbreaking: 1772
- Completed: 1774
- Construction cost: £4,000

Administration
- Province: St Andrews and Edinburgh
- Archdiocese: St Andrews and Edinburgh
- Deanery: St Giles

St Patrick's Church is a Roman Catholic Parish church in the Cowgate part of Old Town, Edinburgh, Scotland. It was built from 1771 to 1774, and became a Catholic church in 1856. The facade of the church was designed by Reginald Fairlie in 1929. It is situated between South Gray's Close and St Mary's Street north of Cowgate and south of the Royal Mile. It is a category B listed building.

== History ==
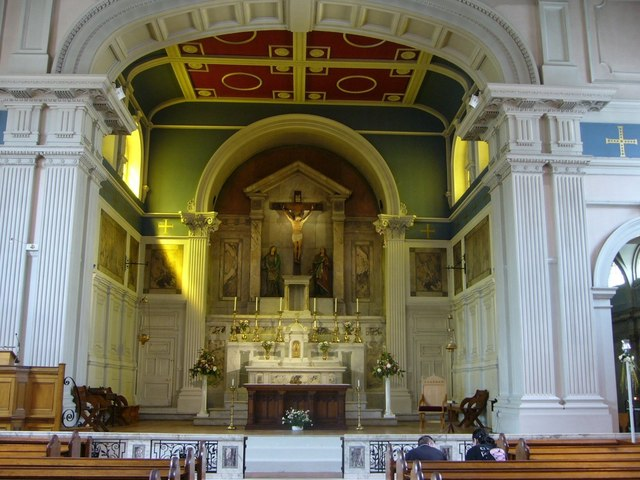
Interior

=== Before the Church ===
The first records of the site are property deeds from 1503 to 1531 when it was a waste strip of land. When Archbishop James Beaton built his palace a short distance west of the church in 1509, he also purchased much of this waste land. Later Mary Queen of Scots’ Italian servant Francisco de Busso owned part of it.

The north part of the church sites was owned, in the late 16th to early 17th centuries, by Dr John Naysmith, surgeon to James VI. The judge Sir James Elphinstone of Logie built ‘Elphinstone Court’ here in the 1670s. The Episcopal Congregation then bought most of the land in 1770 for the construction of the Cowgate Chapel which was built in 1771.

=== Construction ===
Designed by John Baxter, the original church was built from June 1772 to 1774 as a place of worship for the Scottish Episcopal Church. In 1818, the church building became part of the United Presbyterian Church. The Scottish Episcopal Church commissioned Alexander Runciman to produce a series of murals for the church. These were installed but covered over by the Presbyterian congregation. The murals were then forgotten until Duncan Macmillan discovered the murals' existence during the 1960s. Since then, some of the murals have been recovered and remain on the east side of the apse and depict the Parable of the Prodigal Son, Elijah, Moses, Jesus and the Samaritan Woman, and the Ascension of Jesus. As of August 2018, the restoration of the murals remains underway.

In 1856, the church was bought by the Apostolic Vicar of the Eastern District, Bishop James Gillis. The cost of £4,000 was borne half by the local congregation and half by the Catholic Church. On 3 August 1856, the church was opened in a Mass presided over by Bishop Gillis.

=== Extensions ===
In 1898, the sanctuary for the church was remodelled and a new high altar was installed. It was designed by James Graham Fairley. In 1921, the mortuary chapel was built in memory of the parishioners who died in World War I. From 1924 to 1925, two chapels were built in the church, the Lady Chapel and the Sacred Heart Chapel. In 1929, the front church facade was built. It was designed by Reginald Fairlie and included statues of St Patrick and St Brigid.

=== Developments ===
In 2001, priests from the Redemptorists came to serve the parish. On 21 November 2014, after 13 years in Edinburgh, the Redemptorists left and the parish returned to the care of the Archdiocese of St Andrews and Edinburgh.

In September 2023, the church became home to a group of priests discerning community life in the Oratorian tradition.

== Archaeology ==
Excavations in the grounds of the Church, were undertaken by Headland Archaeology from 2006 to 2007 on behalf of the Archdiocese of St Andrews and Edinburgh in advance of the construction of a hotel on part of the church grounds. These excavations reveled aspects of the development of the Cowgate.

It was found that flash floods swept through this part of Cowgate up until the development of the medieval town of Edinburgh in the 11th-12th centuries. In the 14th century, a substantial ditch, believed to be the medieval town boundary, was cut across the site. The ditch was a stinking rubbish dump full of human and animal waste. Later, the ditch was filled in and buildings were eventually built over the site in the 17th century onwards before the church was built.

== Notable persons ==
- Canon Edward Joseph Hannan (1836-1891) ran the church for most of his life and founded Hibernian Football Club during this period
- Canon John Gray, (1866-1934) poet and priest associate of Oscar Wilde, curate and later founder of St Peter's Morningside.
- Margaret Sinclair (1900 - 1925) - nun, as Sister Mary Francis of the Five Wounds, declared Venerable in 1978. The National Shrine of the Venerable Margaret Sinclair is located within St Patrick's.
- James Connolly (Irish revolutionary) (5 June 1868 – 12 May 1916) born in Scotland to Irish parents.

== Parish ==
On 6 August 1875, Hibernian F.C. was founded at the Catholic Institute, commonly known as St. Mary's Street Halls, by St Patrick's Catholic Young Men Society (CYMS). The parish priest Fr Edward Joseph Hannan and Michael Whelahan from the parish's CYMS decided to create the football club. On 17 March 2013 (St Patrick's Day), a plaque commemorating this founding of the club was presented to the church by the Hibernian Supporters Club.

The church has three Sunday Masses; they are at 9:00am, 11:00am and 4:30pm on Sunday.

== See also ==
- Roman Catholic Archdiocese of St Andrews and Edinburgh
