= Virgin Hotels Chicago =

Historic building and hotel

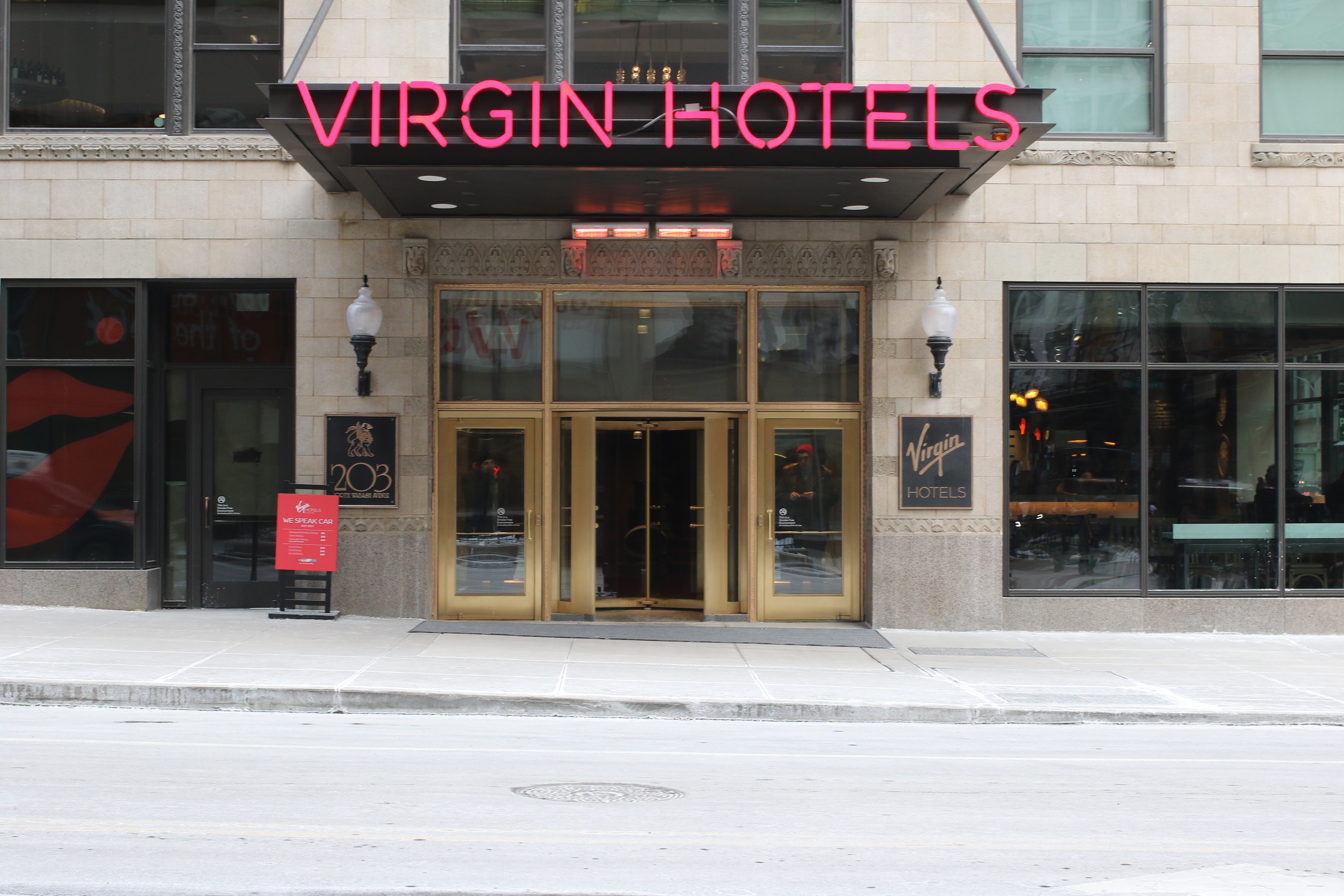
- Virgin Hotels Chicago entrance
- Former names: Old Dearborn Bank Building
- Alternative names: 203 North Wabash Avenue; 54 East Lake Street

General information
- Status: Completed
- Location: 203 North Wabash, Chicago, Illinois
- Coordinates: 41.8861°N 87.6260°W
- Completed: 1928
- Owner: Virgin Hotels

Design and construction
- Architect: Rapp and Rapp

Renovating team
- Architect: Booth Hansen

Chicago Landmark
- Designated: June 4, 2003

The Virgin Hotels Chicago (formerly Old Dearborn Bank Building or 203 North Wabash Avenue) is a historic building in the Loop community area of Chicago, Illinois, that has been converted from use as an office building to use as a hotel run via a mobile app-based business model. The 250-room hotel was the first of Richard Branson's Virgin Hotels brand boutique hotels geared toward the female business traveller.

== Old Dearborn Bank Building ==
Situated at the intersection of East Lake Street and North Wabash Avenue, the Old Dearborn Bank Building was constructed between 1926 and 1928 with ornate medieval and mythological terra-cotta decoration that was typical of movie palaces that were its contemporaries. The neoclassical architecture designed building is one of only two Rapp and Rapp buildings designed as an office building. Soon after the Old Dearborn Bank opened in 1928, it was acquired and its parent company was liquidated in the United States' Great Depression. The building, which is 27 stories high, was designated a Chicago Landmark on June 4, 2003. The 300-foot (91.4 m) light brown brick building with a steel structure includes 25 floors above ground and two below.

The owners of the building defaulted on a $9 million loan from John Hancock Life Insurance resulting in the acquisition of the loan (and thus the property) for an undisclosed amount by Urban Street Properties LLC in April 2010. The building had been acquired by the previous owners for $9.5 million in 2001.

Once also used as an office building that housed a number of graphic artists, the building held a contest sometime in the 1980’s to commission the address plaque to be created by one of the building tenants. Out of the multiple artists and tenants that submitted designs, John Tianis, a Greek immigrant whose graphic artist studio was located in the building for over 20 years, won the contest and designed the address plaque that still sits on the left-hand side of the entrance today.

Address plaque on now historical landmark 203 North Wabash Avenue in downtown Chicago, designed by late graphic artist John Tianis

== Virgin Hotels Chicago ==
On October 24, 2011, Virgin Hotels, part of Virgin Group, purchased the building with the aim of opening it as their first hotel in 2013 with approximately 250 rooms. The transaction was an all-cash deal that was valued at about $14 million. The company hired The John Buck Company to renovate the building. The lead architect for the renovation was Booth Hansen. The co-designers for the interior renovation were Rockwell Group Europe and Virgin Hotels' in-house design team. The purchase was part of Virgin Hotels' 2010 business plan to acquire distressed properties in North America cheaply during the property downturn.

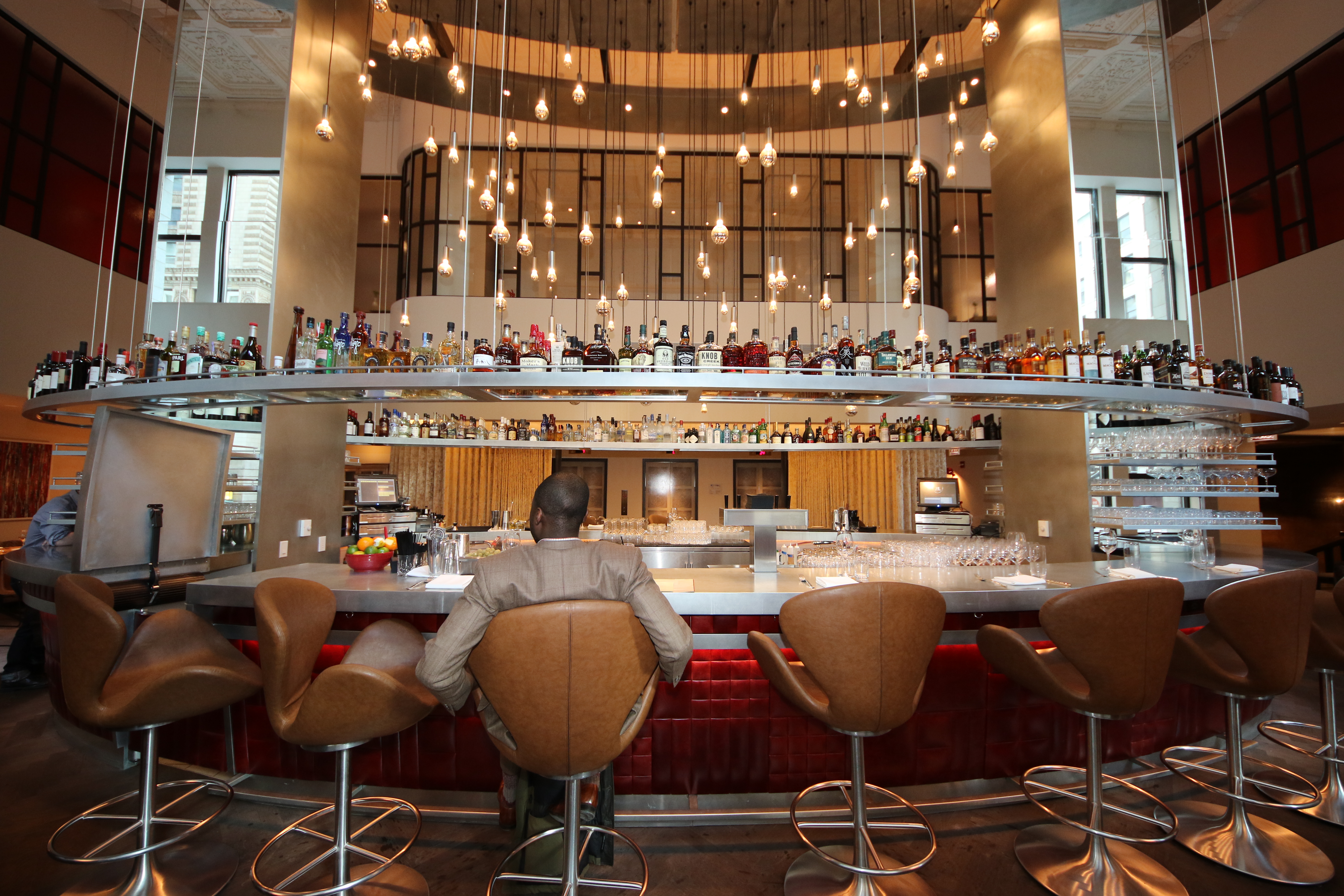
Commons Club main bar

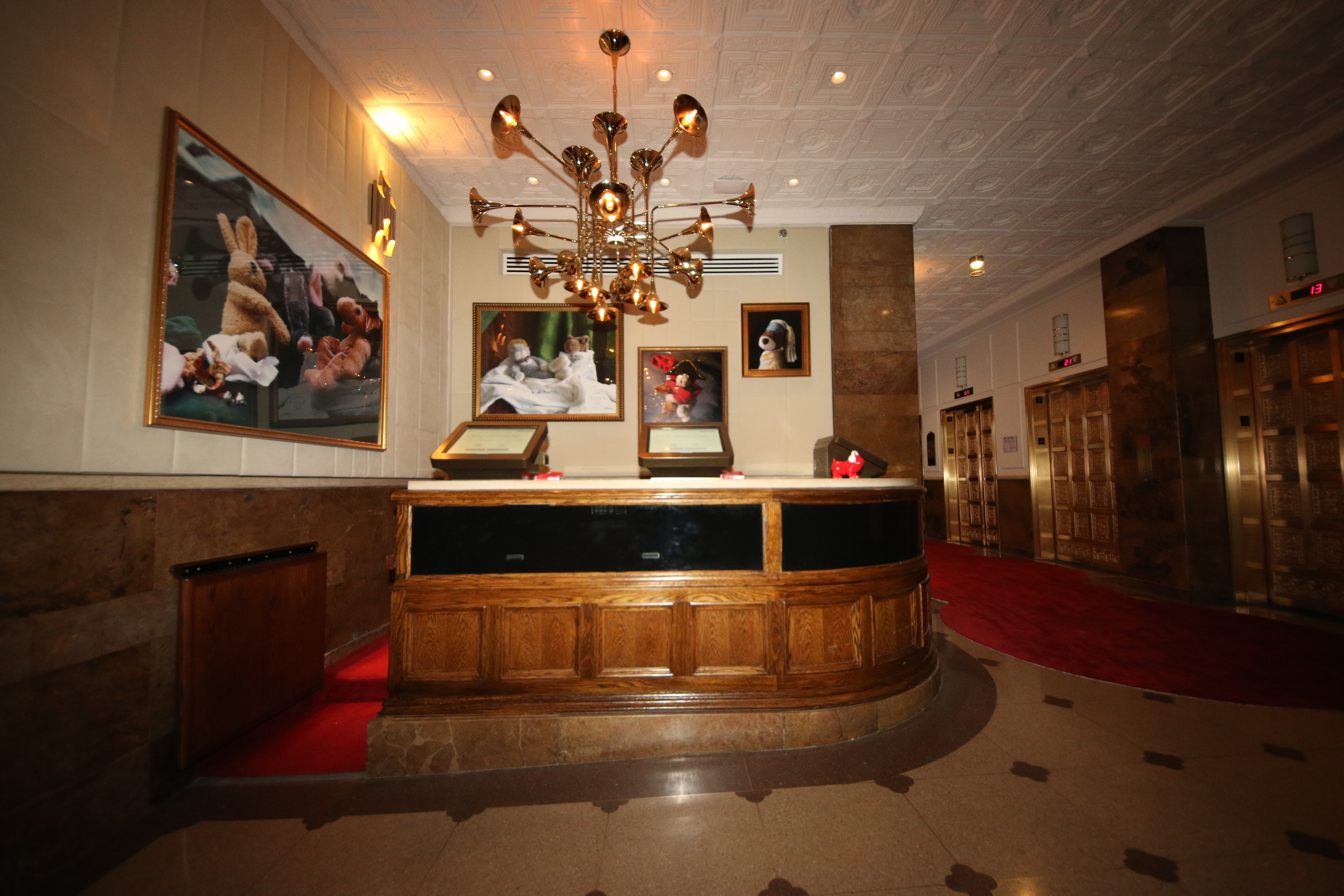
Lobby main desk with check-in screens

The building opened for business as a hotel on January 15, 2015. The renovation took longer than planned due to the building's city landmark status, which required continuing coordination with the Commission on Chicago Landmarks. Original features that were retained include a 1920s oak cigar bar, brass elevator lobby doors and a tiled ceiling. The final layout of 250 rooms includes 40 single-room suites and two penthouse suites. All rooms are pet friendly.

Under the auspices of the Commission on Chicago Landmarks, the renovation included brick, window and steel-frame replacement. The focal point of the renovated building is the publicly accessible Commons Club on the second floor, with a contemporary-style bar, a full kitchen, a lounge area, curated books and local memorabilia. At the time of opening, four additional dining options were expected within three months. The area was carved out of a former second-floor banking hall.

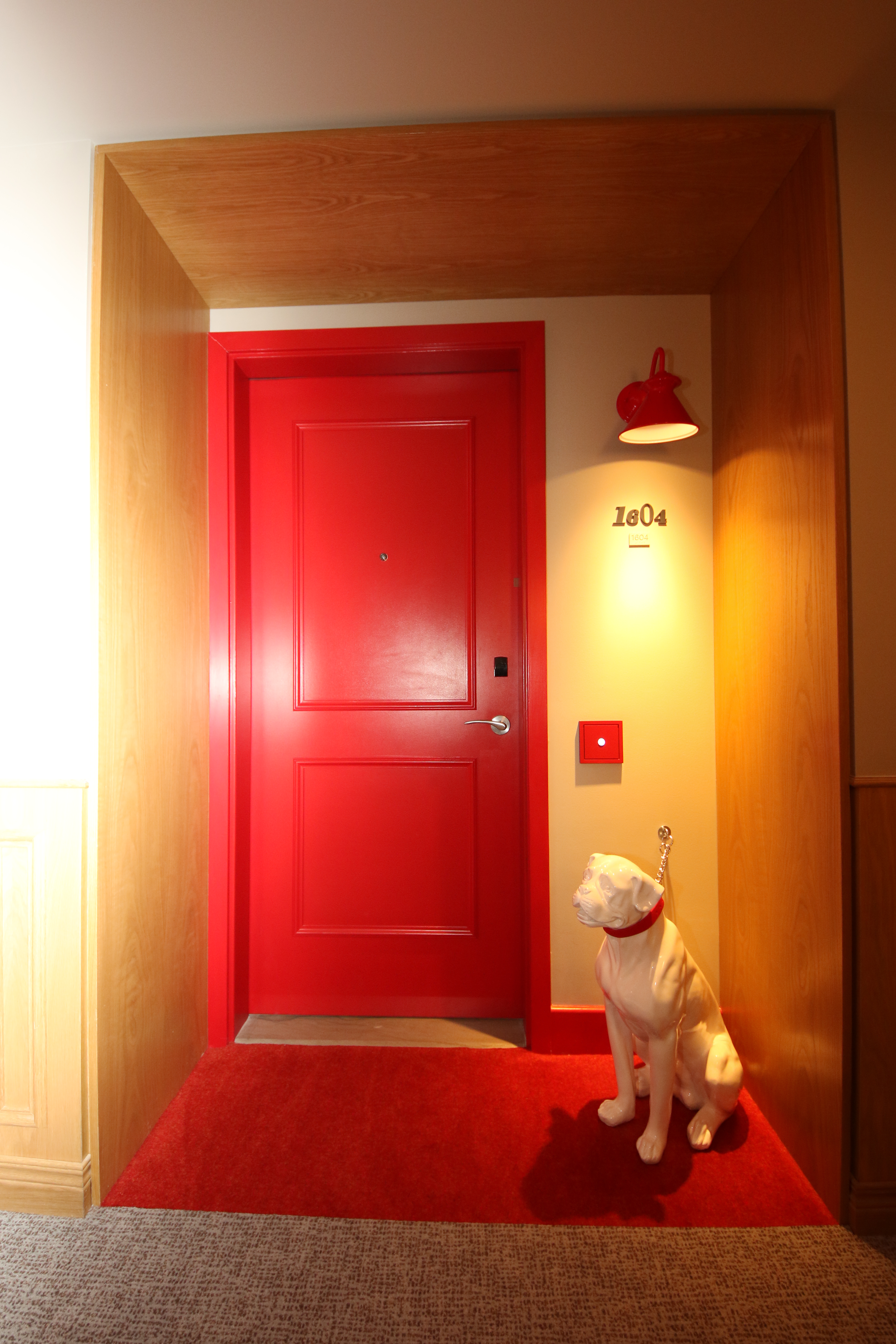
A pet friendly room with its sculptural marking

The visitors use a mobile app, named Lucy, that the company describes as a "personal comfort assistant". According to Mary Forgione of The Los Angeles Times, the app can order more pillows, handle room service orders, and serve as a remote control for both the television and the hotel's music library. The website also suggests that the app can control room temperature, interface with the chat board, provide local knowledge, and coordinate your messages with hotel staff.

When asked about the operation, Virgin's Richard Branson said "There won’t be hidden charges, and you won’t get charged $10 for a chocolate bar you know you can buy at a store for $2." Branson has stated that the brand is geared toward the female business traveler.

=== Reviews ===
Bloomberg Business's Jennifer Parker noted that the hotel was on the cutting edge of technology upon its opening, but questioned whether the hotel had any gender leanings. She found fault with the gym, toiletries, and delayed spa opening, but enjoyed the social ambiance, the normal retail prices of minibar items (rather than more standard hotel overpricing) and the top notch free Wi-Fi. She found many of the appealing elements of the designed to be dubiously marketed, but appealing nonetheless.

Chicago Tribune's Pulitzer Prize-winning architecture critic, Blair Kamin, praised the incorporation of various wildlife into the decor and numerous elements of the rehab resulting from the alliance of real estate developers and historic preservationists, but made it clear that Virgin Hotels Chicago is not the Four Seasons Hotel Chicago or Ritz-Carlton Chicago. He describes this as a successful recycling of a second-tier historic building.

== Old Dearborn Bank Building 2007 Gallery ==
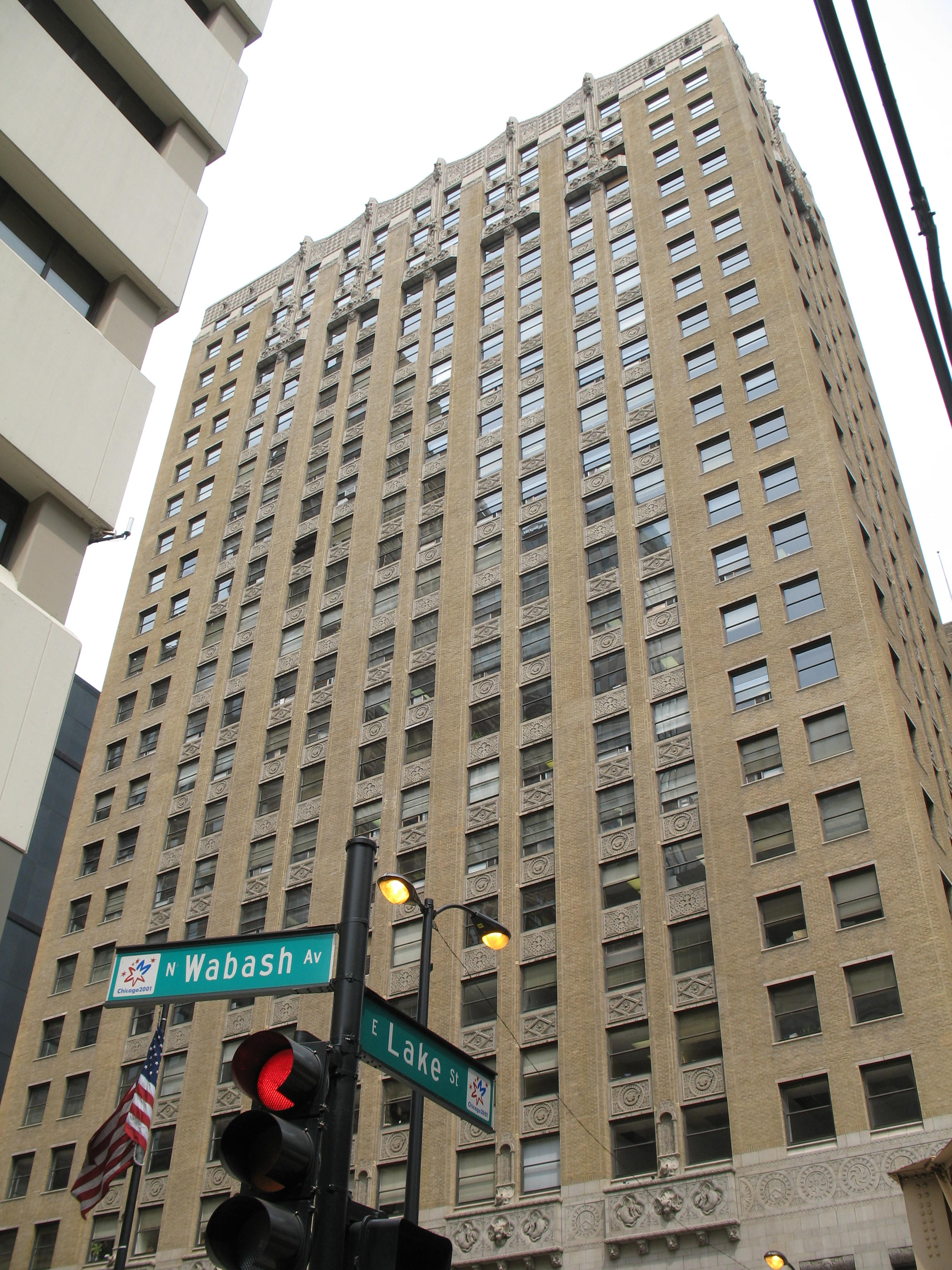

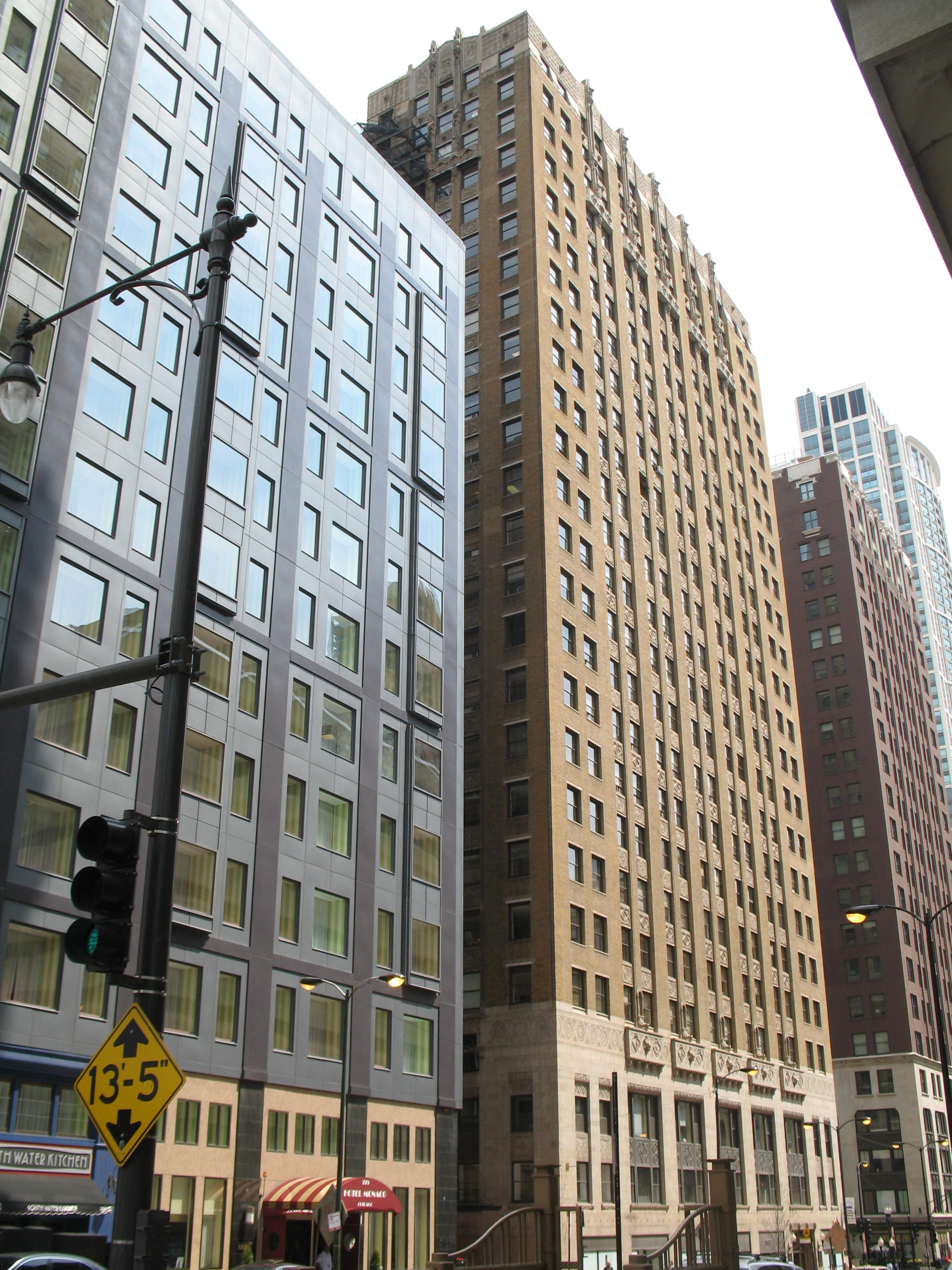

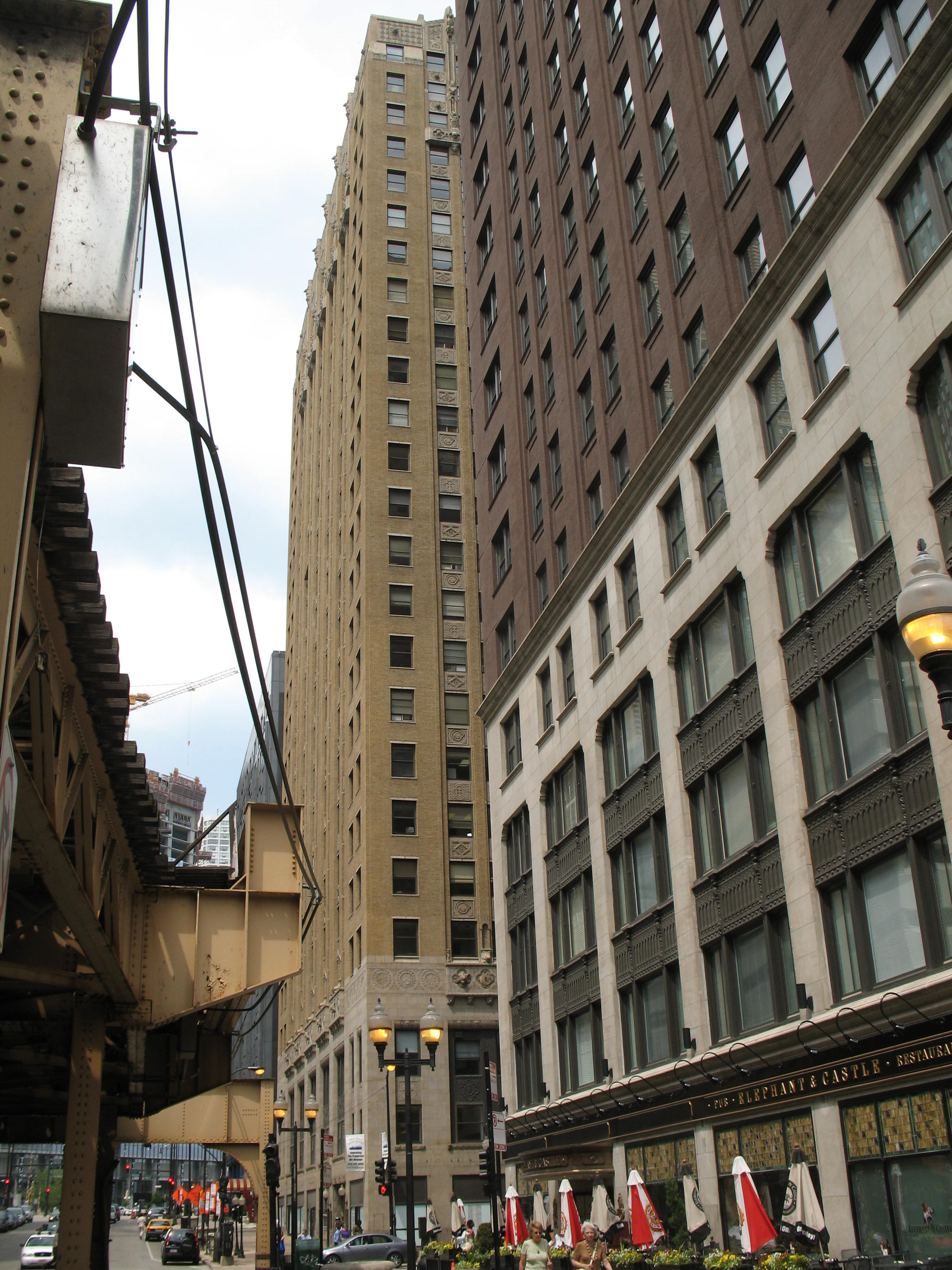

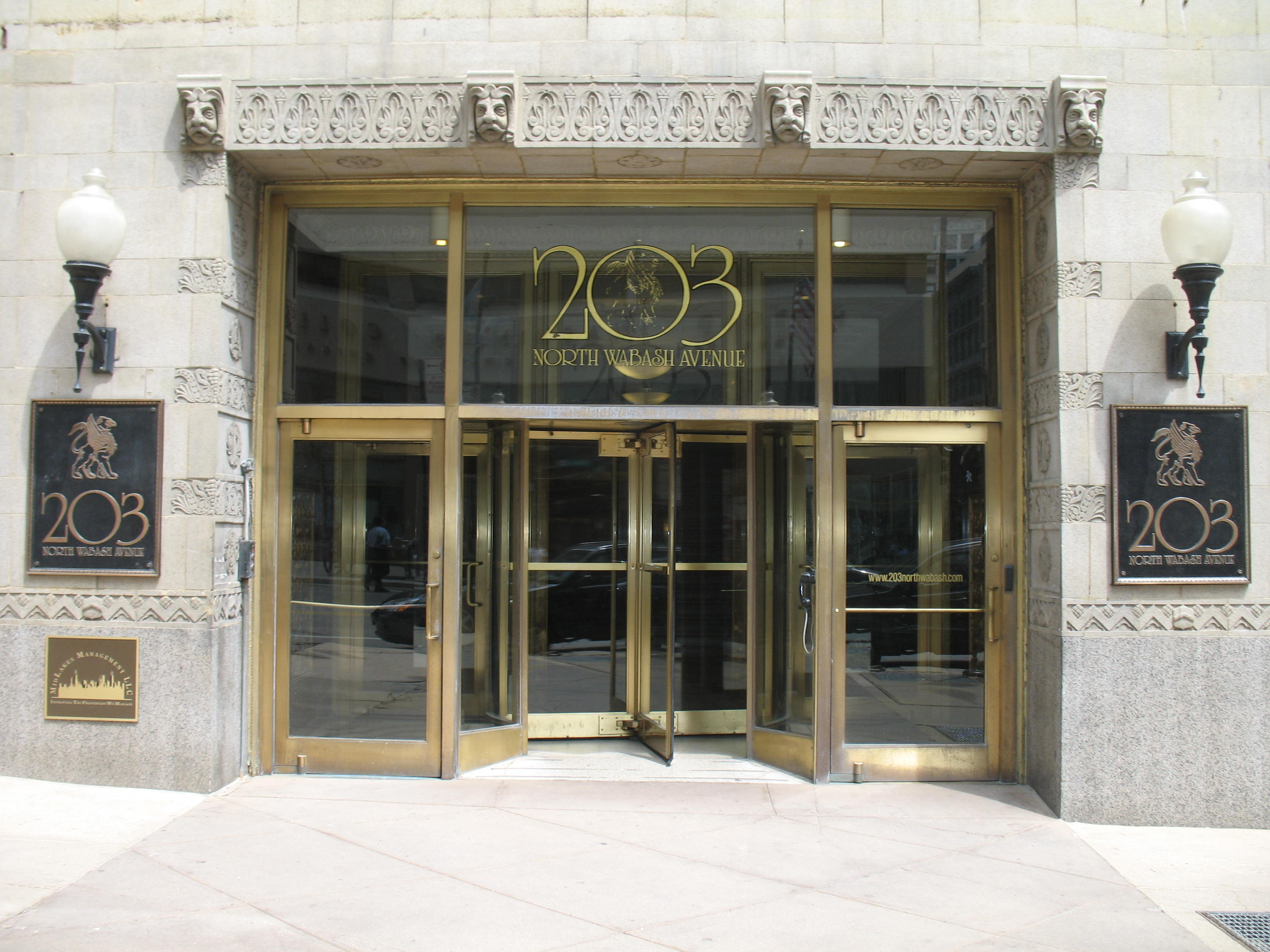
