= Virgin Hotels =

Hotel chain

- Industry: Hospitality
- Founded: New York City, USA (2010)
- Headquarters: Miami, United States
- Number of locations: 7 (2026)
- Area served: United Kingdom; United States
- Key people: Joe Margison, CEO
- Products: Hotels
- Parent: Virgin Hotels Collection(owned by Virgin Group)
- Website: virginhotels.com

Virgin Hotels is a brand of hotels created by Sir Richard Branson's Virgin Group, launched in 2010.

== History ==
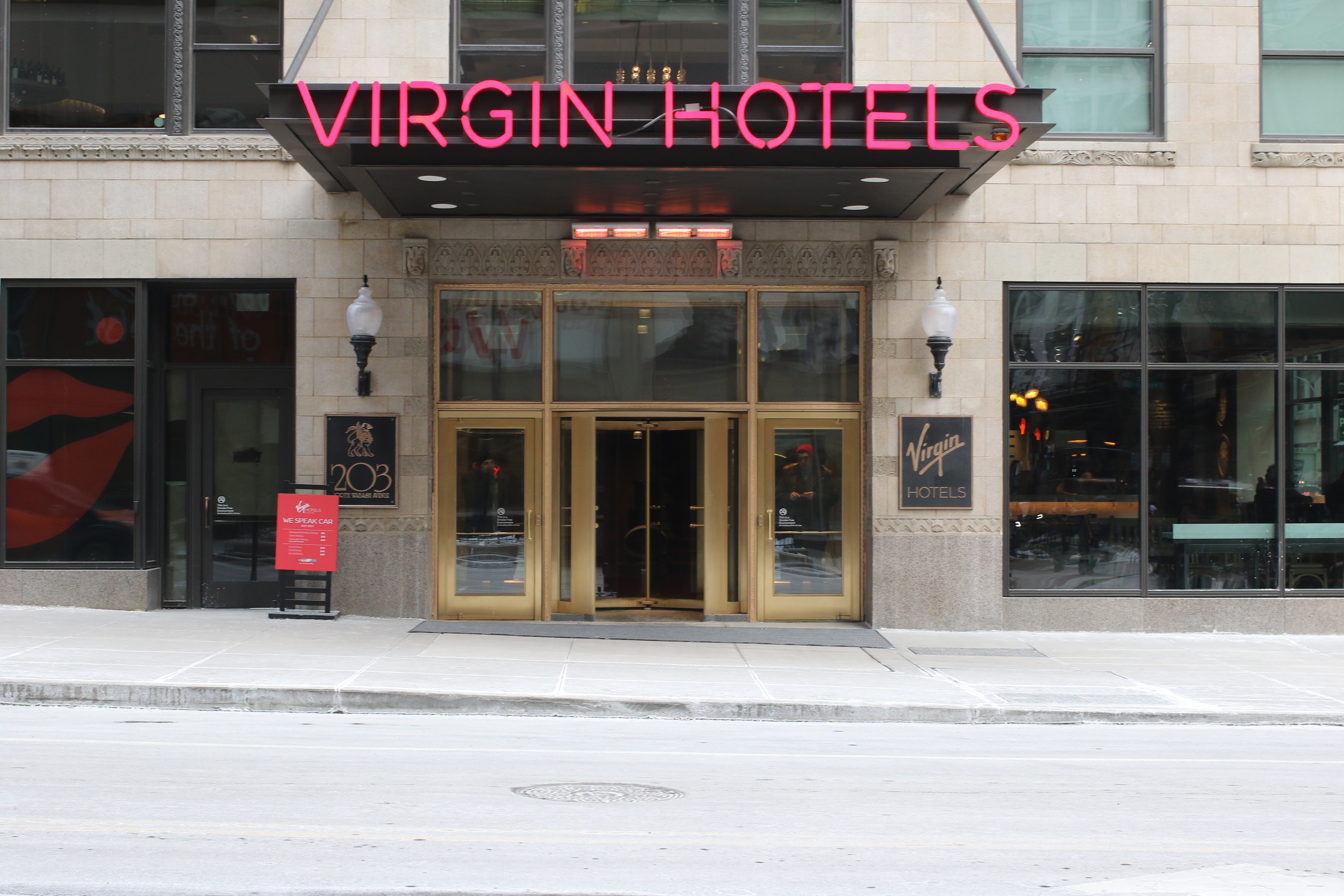
The Virgin Hotel Chicago, which was the company's first property.

In October 2011 Virgin Hotels bought the 27-story Old Dearborn Bank Building in the Loop area of Chicago for $14.8 million from Urban Street Group LLC. On January 15, 2015, the first Virgin Hotel opened. In February 2019, Virgin Hotels opened at its second location in San Francisco, CA on 4th Street, near to Yerba Buena Gardens. One element of Virgin Hotels' business plan was to acquire distressed properties in North America cheaply during the property downturn, but banks decided to hold distressed real-estate assets until the market for them rebounded rather than sell them so the company fell well behind its planned timetable.

Further hotels are being planned in New York City and Nashville. The 300 room New York site will be located on the corner of 29th Street and Broadway. The 240 room Nashville property is to be located at One Music Row. The San Francisco hotel opened on 4th street in February 2019. The Dallas hotel which was the latest to open in December 2019 and is located in the Design District, near Downtown Dallas.

The group aims to have hotels in nine locations by 2025. When asked about the operation, Virgin's Richard Branson said "There won’t be hidden charges, and you won’t get charged $10 for a chocolate bar you know you can buy at a store for $2." Branson has said the brand is geared toward the female business traveler. The British-based Virgin Hotels Group Limited also owns the Virgin Limited Edition portfolio of properties that include luxury resorts such as Necker Island.

In January 2018, rumours arose regarding Virgin's early negotiations toward purchasing the Hard Rock Hotel and Casino in Las Vegas. As of March 2018, Hard Rock Hotel and Casino is expected to be rebranded as Virgin Hotels Las Vegas by the end of 2019. On 5 May 2021, the Las Vegas hotel was opened to the general public.

== Locations ==
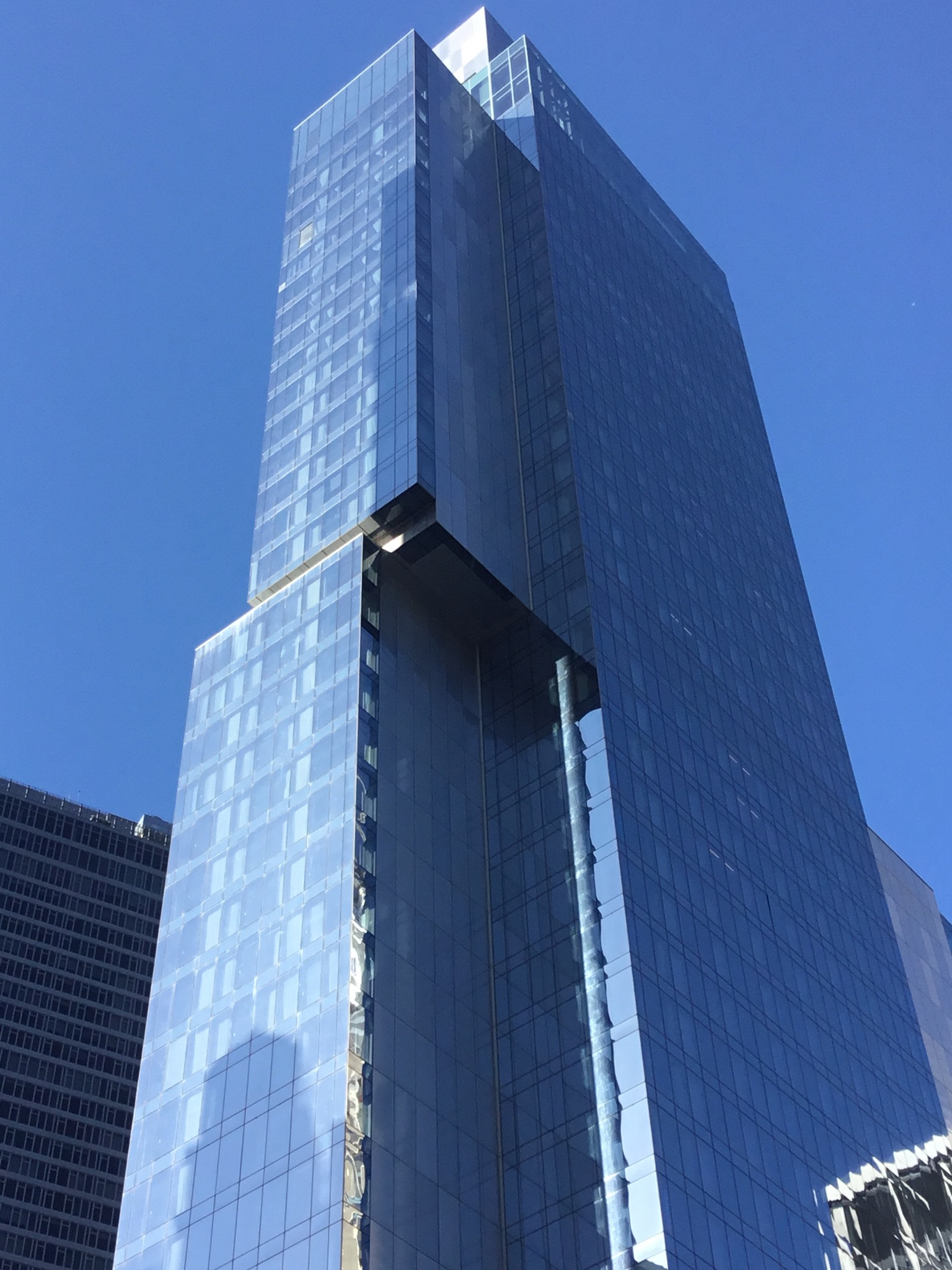
Virgin Hotel New York City

=== Current properties ===
As of 2026, Virgin Hotels operates at the following locations:

==== United States ====
- Virgin Hotels Dallas (Dallas, Texas)
- Virgin Hotels Las Vegas (Las Vegas, Nevada)
- Virgin Hotels Nashville (Nashville, Tennessee)
- Virgin Hotels New Orleans (New Orleans, Louisiana)
- Virgin Hotels New York City (New York City, New York)

==== United Kingdom ====
- Virgin Hotels Edinburgh (Edinburgh, Scotland)
- Virgin Hotels London-Shoreditch (London, England)

=== Future properties ===
- Virgin Hotels Atlanta (Atlanta, Georgia) - 2027
- Virgin Hotels Denver (Denver, Colorado) - 2027

=== Former properties ===
- Virgin Hotels San Francisco (San Francisco, California) - closed after a lawsuit regarding the management contract
- Virgin Hotels Glasgow (Glasgow, Scotland) - closed due to the management contractor entering administration
- Virgin Hotels Chicago (Chicago, Illinois) - closed following the sale to Accelerated Assets. The property will reopen as Sports Illustrated Resort Chicago
