= St. Gabriel's shrine =

Sanctuary of St. Gabriel of Our Lady of Sorrows
- Santuario di San Gabriele dell'Addolorata
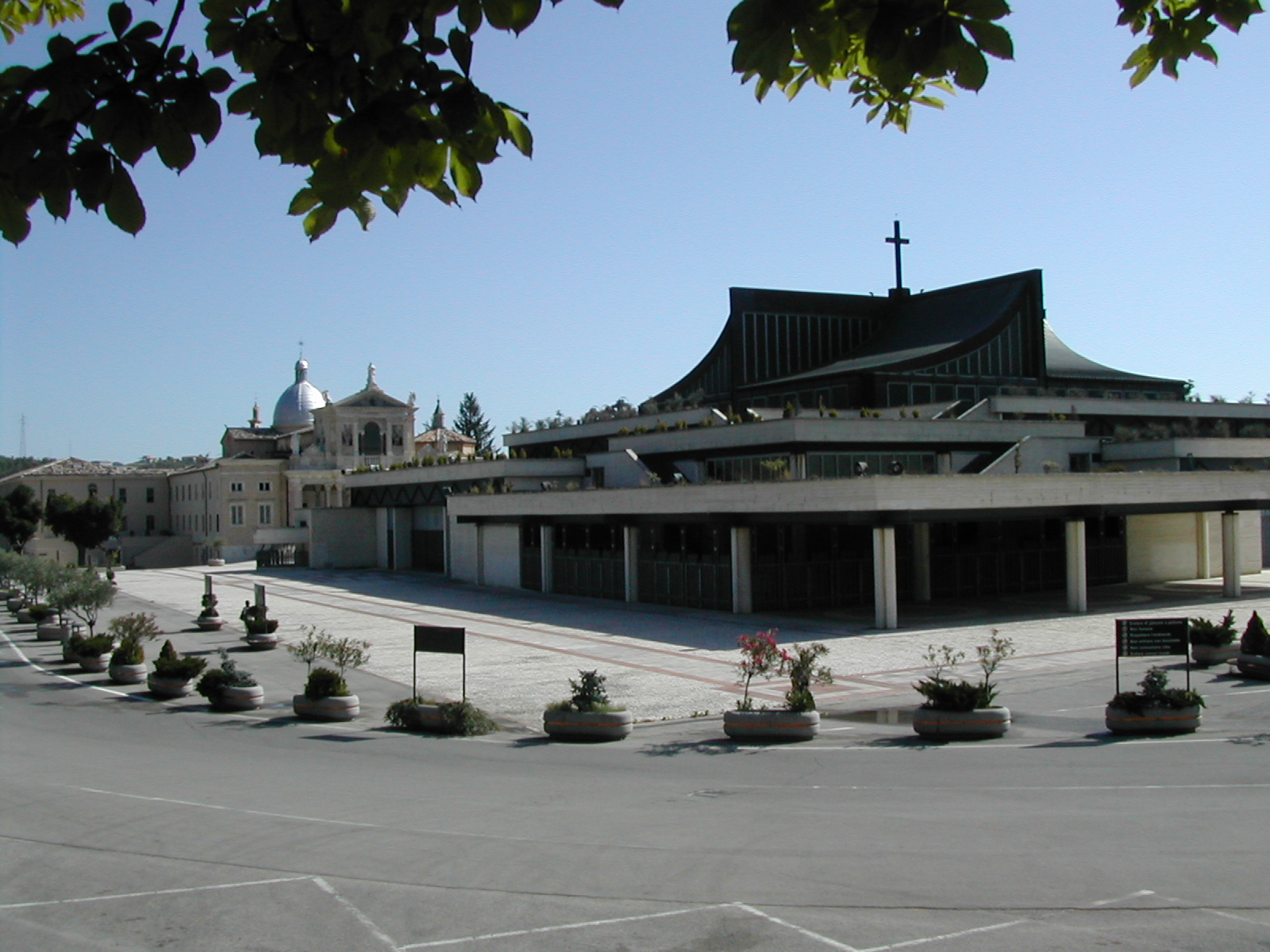
- The new church at the sanctuary with the old church in the background
- Sanctuary of St. Gabriel of Our Lady of Sorrows
- 42.5169°N 13.6575°E
- Location: Isola del Gran Sasso, Teramo, Abruzzo
- Country: Italy
- Denomination: Catholic
- Religious institute: Passionists
- Website: www.sangabriele.org

History
- Status: Minor basilica (since 1929)
- Founded: 1215
- Founder: Saint Francis of Assisi
- Dedication: Gabriel of Our Lady of Sorrows
- Consecrated: 1908 (old church); 1970 (new church)

Architecture
- Functional status: Active
- Architect: Eugenio Abruzzini (new church)
- Architectural type: Basilica
- Style: Rococo (old church); Modern (new church)
- Years built: 1907 (old church) to 1970 (new church)

Administration
- Diocese: Teramo-Atri

The Sanctuary of St. Gabriel of Our Lady of Sorrows (Italian: Santuario di San Gabriele dell'Addolorata) is a Catholic religious sanctuary located at the foot of the Gran Sasso, in the municipality of Isola del Gran Sasso, Teramo province, in the region of Abruzzo in Italy. The sanctuary is dedicated to Gabriel of Our Lady of Sorrows. It receives an average of 2 million visitors a year, making it one of the 15 most visited sanctuaries in the world.

The sanctuary includes four main facilities:

- the monastery, belonging to the order of the Passionists, where St. Gabriel died in 1862;
- the old church, built in 1908 in honor of St. Gabriel;
- the new 1970 church of reinforced concrete, glass and steel, which is usually open on holidays to accommodate the large number of visiting pilgrims (with a capacity of 5 to 6 000 people);
- the publishing house of the magazine Eco di San Gabriele, covering the sanctuary's activities

== History ==
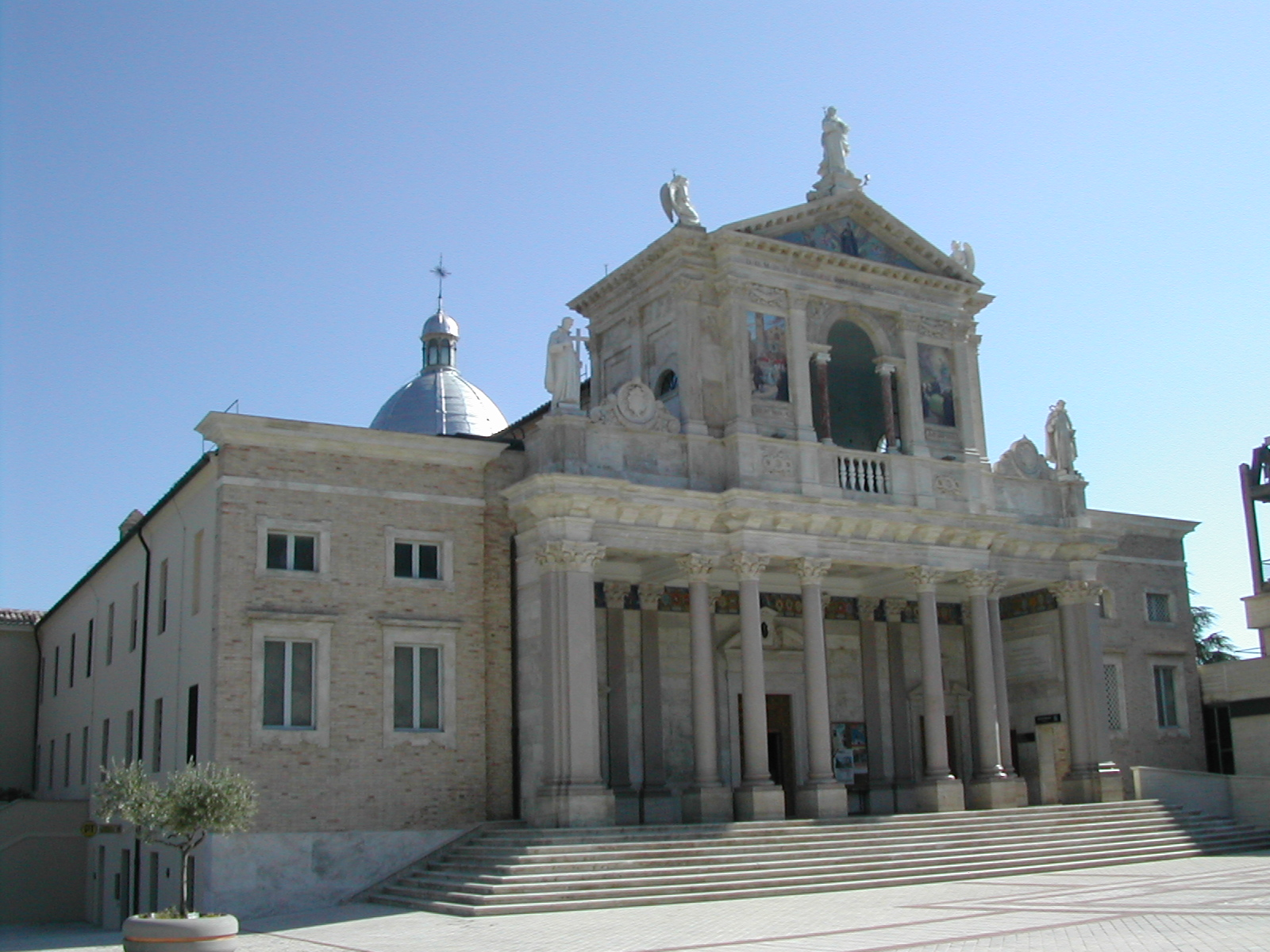
The old church

Around 1215, St. Francis of Assisi founded a Franciscan monastery in the municipality of Isola del Gran Sasso, which is the precursor of the present sanctuary. Construction of the monastery and a church dedicated to Mary, the mother of Jesus was started in 1216.

In 1809 the monastery was abandoned by the Franciscans following the suppression of religious orders during the Napoleonic period, and their place was taken in 1847 by the Passionists.

The well of Saint Francis (Italian: Pozzo di San Francesco), the staircase of Saint Gabriel (Italian: Scala San Gabriele) and in the cloister, a series of 17th-century frescoes depicting scenes from the life of St. Francis are all that remain of the original building.

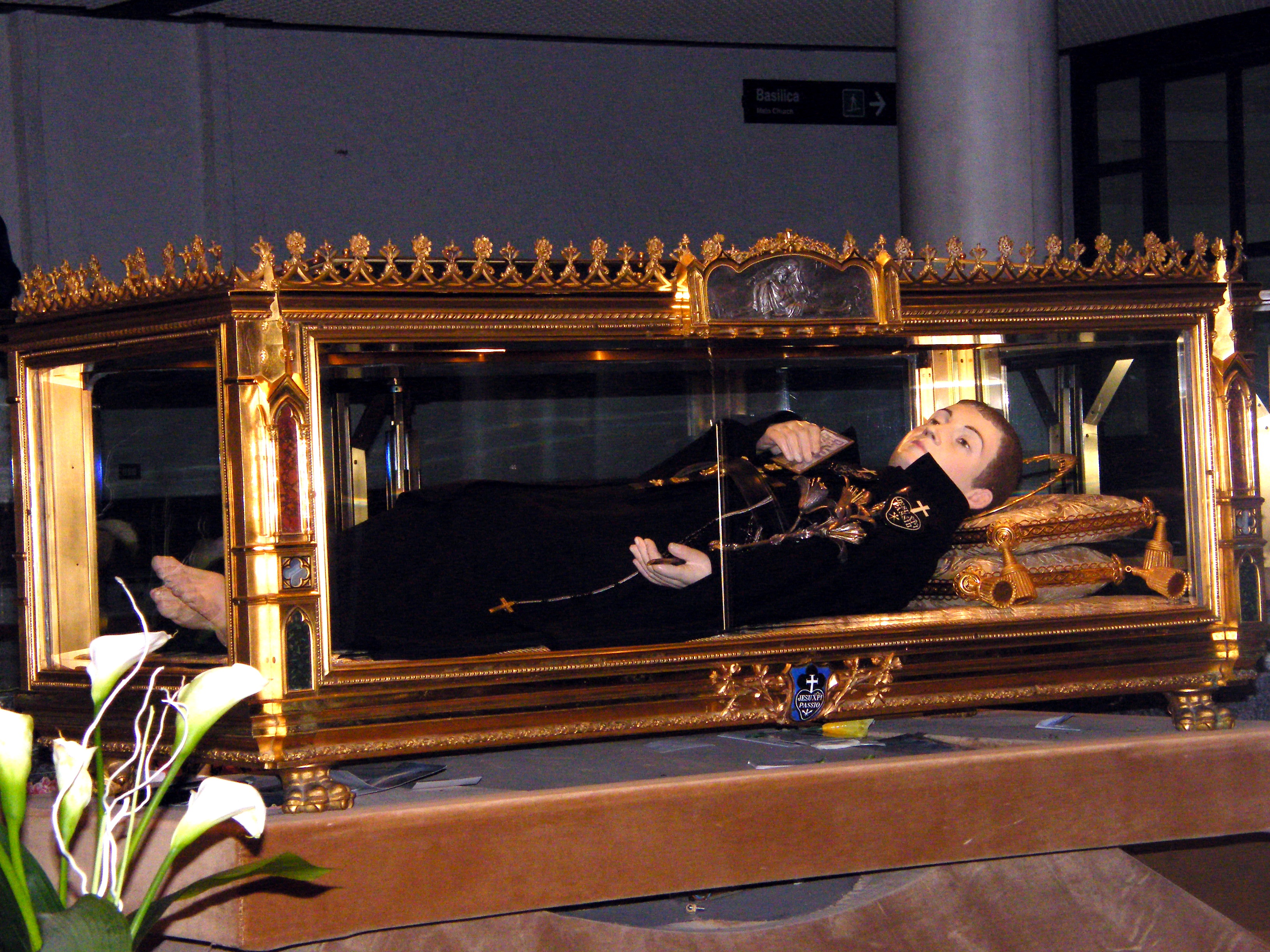
The urn with the remains of St. Gabriel in the modern church

The urn containing the mortal remains of St. Gabriel that was formerly preserved in the old church, was later moved into the new church.

In July 1929, Pope Pius XI promoted the old church to be a minor basilica.

Pope John Paul II blessed the crypt and the confessionals of the new church on 30 June 1985, whilst construction work was being undertaken. The new church was rededicated on 21 September 2014.

== Description ==
=== Old church ===
The church has a basilica plan with a monumental façade made up of a portico centrally supported by two sets of three columns, each arranged in a triangle. The entrance is made of marble with three doors; the main central door is topped by a painted architrave.

The main façade is decorated with statues of saints above the sides of a portico and has a central loggia (used for benedictions) with a single central arch supported by a pair of columns. On either side of the loggia are portrayed two important scenes from the life of Saint Gabriel. The architrave of the façade is styled after a Greek temple, with a painting of San Gabriel surround by angels and decorated with three other statues.

The interior of the church has three naves decorated in baroque style. The vaults are painted in light blue. The chapels do not have any relevant artistic elements. The apse is decorated in the early Christian style with the saints portrayed within false recesses. Saint Gabriel is portrayed between the two archangels Gabriel and Michael. The columns are decorated with Ionic capitals.

Half way along the central nave there is the old chapel that housed the relics of Saint Gabriel, prior to their relocation to the new church. The chapel is in false Gothic style with tall and narrow arches and gold arabesques portraying praying angels.

Adjacent to the church is the building of the Passionist monastery.

=== New church ===
The church's layout is a Greek cross with four slender arms connected by wide fan-shaped sections. The steel roof rests above the entrance ways, which are on three sides of the square concrete base of the building. The top of the roof has a cross-shaped section. The windows are made of green coloured glass installed in a repeating pattern and are rectangular.

The interior is geometrically patterned, both on the roof and from the three main entrance ways that lead towards the altar. The altar is in the center of the church, resting on a diamond-shaped marble platform; while the apse is distinguished by a reddish glass decoration. At the altar, there is baroque marble decoration depicting the crucified Jesus and the Holy Spirit venerated by Mother Teresa of Calcutta and another woman.

=== Pipe organ ===
The new church did not have a pipe organ until 2012, when it was decided to install an organ suitable for the large size of the church. The renowned organ company Claudio Anselmi Tamburini was responsible for the work.

The organ was a previously used instrument manufactured in 1961 by the German company Späth (Opus 737). It a single unit located on the corner between the nave and the right choir transept. The instrument has 3,200 pipes for a total of 49 registers on three manuals, with electric actuation.

The installation of the organ and subsequent acoustic improvements was undertaken in multiple phases. The organ was purchased by Ladach (a famous retailer of used organs), it was dismantled and shipped from Germany to an organ workshop in Asciano, where the acoustic components and the bellows were restored and the windchests were modified. Furthermore, given the shortage of registers on the third manual, three new registers were added, including an Oboe and a Celeste.

The console has also been completely rebuilt, with three manuals of 56 notes each (Do1-Sol5) and a 30 note concave-parallel pedal board (Do1-Fa3).

=== Devotional events ===
The sanctuary of St. Gabriel is a place of pilgrimage that is very dear to young people. Two main events are held each year: one in March, one hundred days prior to the high school diploma examinations, in which thousands of students from Abruzzo and Marche visit the sanctuary, to pray for a successful outcome, and to have their pens blessed; and another in the last week of August; where a tent city is set up where hundreds of young people (but also not so young) camp for five days, giving life to a religious meeting.

Famous visitors of the shrine include Pope John Paul II and Joseph Ratzinger when he was prefect of the Congregation for the Doctrine of the Faith. A photographic memorial of their visits is in the new church.

=== Art ===
The new church houses fine examples of sacred art by contemporary artists such as Enrico Accatino, Ugolino da Belluno, Guido Strazza, Tito Amodei, Nino Di Simone, as directed by the architect Eugenio Abruzzini.
