= Three Days of Darkness =

Catholic eschatological prophecy

In Roman Catholicism, the Three Days of Darkness is an eschatological concept believed by some Catholics to be a true prophecy of future events. The prophecy foretells three days and nights of "an intense darkness" over the whole earth, against which the only light will come from blessed beeswax candles, and during which "all the enemies of the Church ... will perish."

The prophecy parallels one of the Ten Plagues against Egypt in the Book of Exodus (Ex. 10:21–29). The Apocalypse of John also mentions a plague of unnatural darkness as an effect of the fifth vial (Revelation 16:10: "And the fifth angel poured out his vial upon the seat of the beast; and his kingdom was full of darkness"). Unnatural darkness is also associated with the sixth seal of Revelation (Revelation 6:12: "And I beheld when he had opened the sixth seal, and, lo, there was a great earthquake; and the sun became black as sackcloth of hair, and the moon became as blood").

However, the specifics of the "Three Days of Darkness" prophecy, such as the miraculous beeswax candles, are derived from private revelation.

== Advocates ==
Anna Maria Taigi (1769–1837) is the best-known seer associated with the Three Days of Darkness prophecy. She reportedly described the event as follows. (On the other hand, it has been doubted whether the following prophecy is correctly attributed to Anna Maria Taigi at all.)

There shall come over the whole earth an intense darkness lasting three days and three nights. Nothing can be seen, and the air will be laden with pestilence which will claim mainly, but not only, the enemies of religion. It will be impossible to use any man-made lighting during this darkness, except blessed candles. He, who out of curiosity, opens his window to look out, or leaves his home, will fall dead on the spot. During these three days, people should remain in their homes, pray the Rosary and beg God for mercy. All the enemies of the Church, whether known or unknown, will perish over the whole earth during that universal darkness, with the exception of a few whom God will soon convert. The air shall be infected by demons who will appear under all sorts of hideous forms.

Marie-Julie Jahenny (1850–1941), known as the "Breton Stigmatist," expanded upon the story of the Three Days of Darkness. According to Jahenny, it would occur on a Thursday, Friday and Saturday; all of Hell would be let loose to strike at those outside their homes and those without a lit blessed candle of pure wax. These candles would miraculously stay aflame the entire period, but not light at all in the houses of the godless.

== Padre Pio hoax ==
In the late 1940s, the name of Saint Padre Pio (1887–1968) was attached to a letter endorsing the Three Days of Darkness; but the letter was in fact written by the "Council of Heroldsbach," a religious cult in Germany later outlawed by the Vatican. Since 1950 the "Pio" forgery has been repeatedly denounced by both the Capuchin order and the Archdiocese of Bamberg.

== Sedevacantist views ==
Some sedevacantists hope that a true Pope will be miraculously designated by an apparition of Saint Peter and Saint Paul; this tangential belief assumes that the pontiffs in those times of the Church will be, in fact "antipopes".

== See also ==
- Crucifixion darkness
- Plagues of Egypt
- Rapture
