= Tettemer =

Tettemer is a surname. Notable people with the surname include:

- Elaine Tettemer Marshall, née Elaine Tettemer (born 1942), American billionaire heiress
- John Moynihan Tettemer (1876–1949), American Roman Catholic monk and autobiographer
