= Grimoaldo of the Purification =

Italian beatified

Blessed Grimoaldo of the Purification C.P.
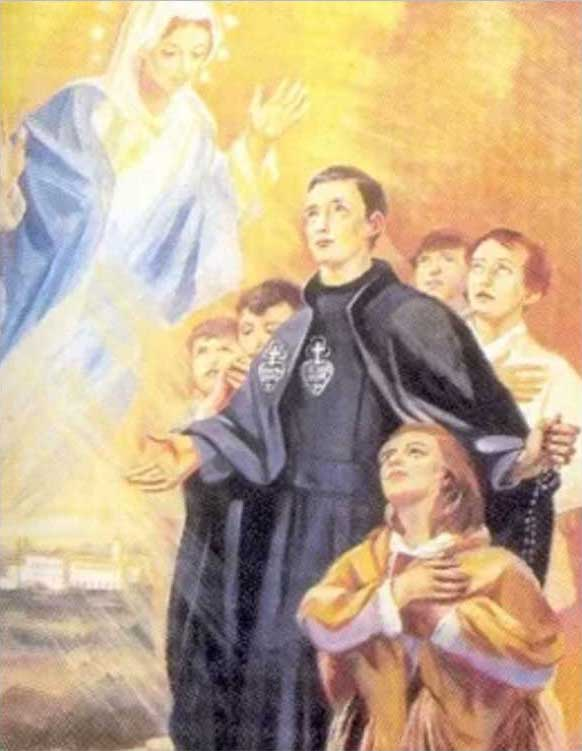

Religious
- Born: 4 May 1883; Pontecorvo, Kingdom of Italy
- Died: 18 November 1902 (aged 19); Ceccano, Kingdom of Italy
- Venerated in: Roman Catholic Church
- Beatified: 29 January 1995, Saint Peter's Square, Vatican City by Pope John Paul II
- Feast: 18 November
- Attributes: Passionist habit

Grimoaldo of the Purification (4 May 1883 – 18 November 1902) – born Ferdinando Santamaria – was an Italian Roman Catholic clerical student from the Passionists. He had expressed his inclinations towards the religious life from his childhood when he served as an altar server and was exposed to the Passionist charism; but he did not join until 1899 once his father approved of his vocation, and he was professed in 1900. He then continued his studies – though this time for the priesthood – but died from meningitis before he could achieve this dream.

Santamaria's reputation for holiness was well-noted in his hometown during his life and it increased after his death, while devotion to him soared in Rochester, New York once his widowed mother and sister immigrated there. Pope John Paul II presided over his beatification in 1995.

== Life ==
Ferdinando Santamaria was born on 4 May 1883 as the eldest of five children to Pero Paulo Santamaria and Cecilia Ruscio (d.1933–34); he received his baptism on 5 May in the local parish church. His parents ran a small rope-making business and were a pious couple.

He received his Confirmation in September 1883 at the Pontecorvo Cathedral from Cardinal Gaetano Aloisi Masella which was unusual at the time because he was not at the normal age for being confirmed; he made his First Communion at the age of eight. His education began in 1890 and the priest Antonio Roscia was his teacher. Santamaria served as an altar server in his childhood from the age of eight and was a member of the church choir while also being a member of the Immaculate Conception Association that Romano Xativa ran from the age of nine. One neighbor even testified that on one occasion he had seen Santamaria lifted from the floor while he reflected in silence.

In 1850 the Passionists took possession of a convent in the area and he soon became familiar with them while attempting to replicate their lives of penance into his own. His father had encouraged him to continue working in the business that he ran though Santamaria had become convinced that he wanted to join the Passionists himself and announced this at aged thirteen despite his father's reluctance to grant his son approval. But he was not even sixteen and his age prevented him from entering their ranks; while he waited until he was at the required age he took up lessons in Latin. He entered the order on 15 February 1899 and began his period of novitiate on 5 March 1899 at the Santa Maria de Olite convent, and assumed the religious name of "Grimoaldo of the Purification". The novice was quite keen to model his life on Francesco Possenti. He made his vows as a religious on 6 March 1900. He began his studies for the priesthood at Orthez where he found it difficult to adopt a scholastic discipline; he soon managed to overcome this brief impediment.

On 31 October 1902 he was struck with an illness in the afternoon as he roamed the convent gardens, when he felt a stabbing pain in his head and dizziness; this was later diagnosed in November 1902 as acute meningitis. He was confined to his bed, but on 1 November attended Mass. Santamaria died from meningitis on 18 November 1902 at his convent. On his deathbed he had prophesied the date of his own death and that of Cardinal Gaetano Aloisi Masella. His mother and father – as well as numerous others – reported to have seen Santamaria appear to them, while emigration of relatives saw interest in him grow abroad with a particular emphasis in Rochester. His remains were later relocated in October 1962. His sister Vincenzina moved to Rochester sometime after his death and in 1920 his widowed mother moved in with her.

== Beatification ==
The beatification process opened in the Basque Country and Pontecorvo dioceses in an informative process that collected documents and witness testimonies right through 1957, before all documents were sealed in boxes and sent to the Congregation for Rites in Bilbao for investigation; the cause remained inactive until 5 October 1984 when the Congregation for the Causes of Saints validated the process. The postulation sent the Positio dossier to the C.C.S. in 1988 while theologians approved its contents on 9 October 1990 as did the C.C.S. themselves on 22 January 1991. On 14 May 1991 he became titled as Venerable after Pope John Paul II confirmed that Santamaria had lived a model life of heroic Christian virtues.

One miracle required approval for his beatification and one such Basque case was investigated before it received C.C.S. validation on 20 December 1991; a medical board approved this on 7 October 1993 as did theologians on 4 February 1994 and the C.C.S. on 12 April 1994. John Paul II approved this case on 2 July 1994 and beatified Santamaria in Saint Peter's Square on 29 January 1995. His three nieces from Rochester – Mary Panella Agostinelli, Helene Panella Schlegel and Ida Panella Turan, as well as dozens of great nephews, nieces and their children – were present at the beatification as was Nicola Romano (who was cured through Santamaria's intercession).

The current postulator for this cause is the Passionist priest Giovanni Zubiani.

=== Miracle ===
The miracle that led to his beatification involved the child Nicola Romano who was involved in what should have been a fatal tractor accident; his father appealed to Santamaria to save him and doctors became baffled that the child escaped the accident without mortal injuries.
