= Gabriel of Our Lady of Sorrows =

Italian Passionist student (1838–1862)

Saint Gabriel of Our Lady of Sorrows (Francesco Possenti) CP
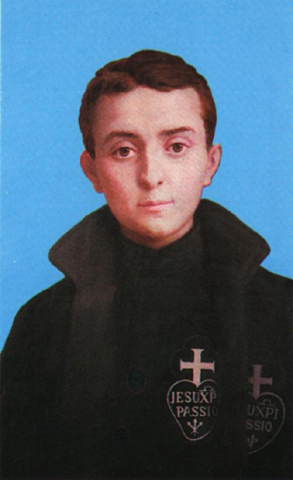
- A depiction of Saint Gabriel of Our Lady of Sorrows wearing the Passionist Habit. The Passionist Sign, part of the Habit, is on his chest.

Confessor
- Born: 1 March 1838; Assisi, Papal States (now Italy)
- Died: 27 February 1862 (aged 23); Isola del Gran Sasso, Kingdom of Italy
- Venerated in: Catholic Church
- Beatified: 31 May 1908, Rome, Italy by Pope Pius X
- Canonized: 13 May 1920, Rome, Italy by Pope Benedict XV
- Major shrine: San Gabriele, Teramo, Abruzzi
- Feast: 27 February
- Attributes: Passionist Habit and Sign
- Patronage: Students, Youth, Clerics, Seminarians, Abruzzi

Gabriel of Our Lady of Sorrows (Italian: Gabriele dell'Addolorata; born Francesco Possenti; 1 March 1838 – 27 February 1862) was an Italian Passionist seminarian. Born to a professional family, he gave up ambitions of a secular career to enter the Passionist congregation. His life in the monastery was not extraordinary, yet he followed the rule of the congregation perfectly and was known for his great devotion to the sorrows of the Virgin Mary. He died from tuberculosis at the age of 23 in Isola del Gran Sasso, in the province of Teramo. He was canonized by Pope Benedict XV in 1920.

== Early life ==
Francesco Possenti was born on 1 March 1838, in Assisi, Italy, the eleventh of thirteen children born to his mother, Agnes, and his father, Sante. The family were then residents in the town of Assisi where Sante worked for the local government. Possenti was baptised on the day of his birth in the same font in which Francis of Assisi had been baptised. Shortly after Francis' birth Sante Possenti was transferred to a post at Montalta and thence to Spoleto where, in 1841, he was appointed legal assessor. In Spoleto the family was struck with a number of bereavements: the deaths of a baby girl, Rosa, in December 1841; of seven-year-old Adele in January 1842; and of Francis’ mother, Agnes, in 1842.

As a child and young man, Francesco Possenti was well liked by his peers and had a reputation for great charity and piety. He was also known for the great care he took with regard to his appearance and would spend hours in preparing himself for parties. Francesco could be a difficult child and was liable to bouts of anger. Francesco was deeply involved with the social scene of Spoleto and soon earned for himself the nickname of "the dancer". He was a ladies man and had several romantic involvements and on the night he left for the Passionists there were still hopes that he might become engaged to a local girl, Maria Panachetti, who was in love with him and who had been on several dates with him (this same girl later attended Gabriel's beatification and canonisation). He was educated first by the Christian Brothers and then by the Jesuits in the town's college and there excelled, particularly in Latin. In 1851 Possenti became desperately ill and promised to enter religious life if he recovered. Once he had recovered, his promise was soon forgotten. The same thing happened when he narrowly escaped a stray bullet during a hunting expedition with friends. His brother Paul had died in 1848 and his brother Lawrence died by suicide in 1853. In 1853 Francesco again fell ill, this time afflicted with a throat abscess. He attributed his healing to the recently beatified Andrew Bobola. Once more he had promised to enter religious life upon his recovery and this time actually set the process in motion. He applied to join the Jesuits, but for some unknown reason never proceeded. Tragedy struck again when his sister, Mary Louisa, who had cared for Possenti after their mother's death, died of cholera.

== Vocation ==
After the cholera epidemic that killed Possenti's sister ended, Spoleto clergy and civic authorities organised a procession of the ancient icon of the Virgin Mary in Spoleto's cathedral. Possenti attended the procession and as the image passed by him, he felt an interior voice asking why he remained in the world. This event was the galvanising force behind the first serious steps in Possenti's religious vocation. After the procession he sought the advice of a priest and resolved to enter the Passionist Congregation. As there was no Passionist house near Spoleto, it is most likely that Possenti's choice was based on a personal devotion to the Passion of Christ. His father refused to give him permission to leave for the Passionists and enlisted several relatives to dissuade Possenti from his course. Their attempts were unsuccessful and soon his father was convinced that Possenti's intentions were sincere and not capricious.

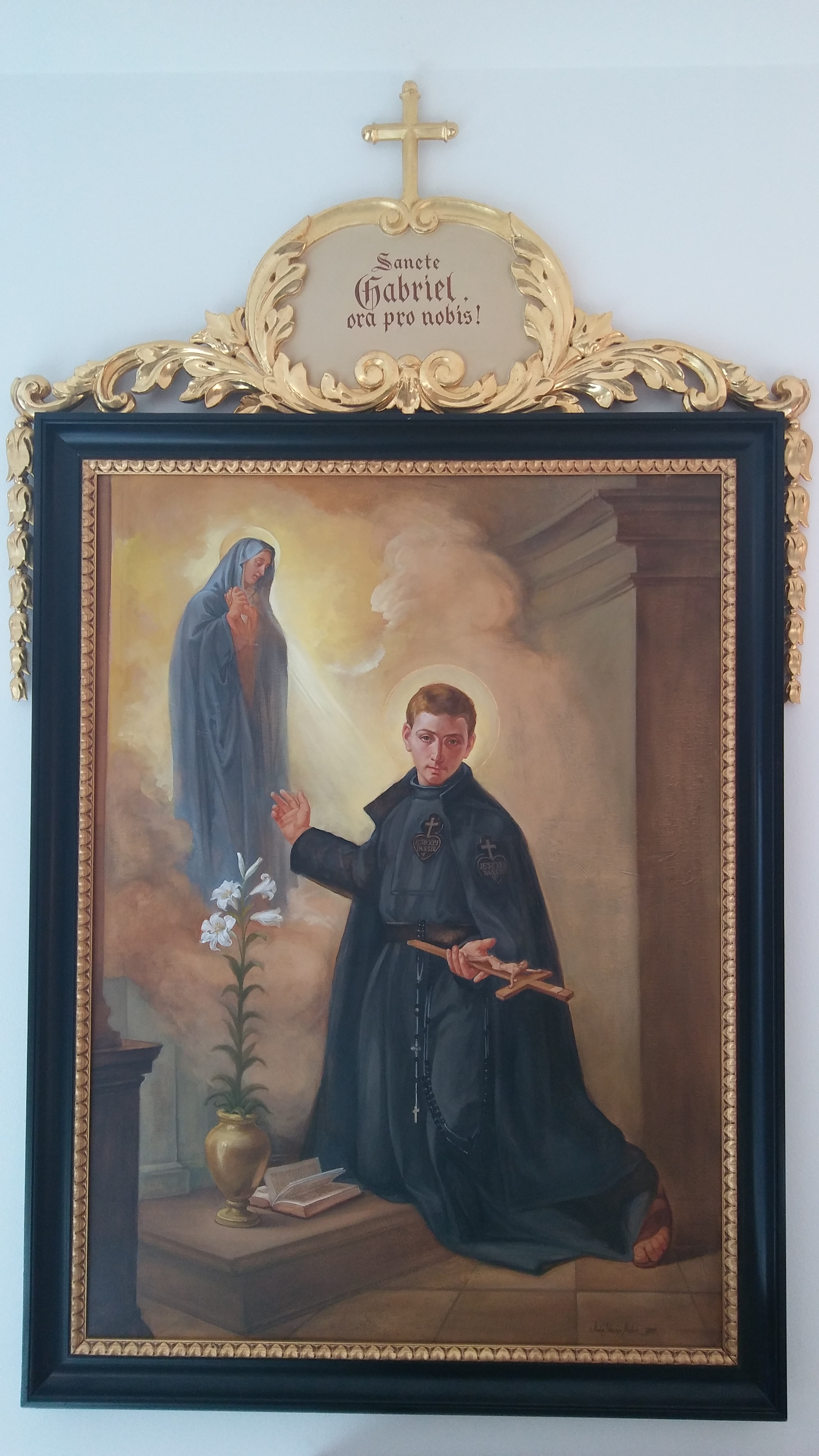
St. Gabriel of Our Lady of Sorrows (Painting in the parish hall of Völs am Schlern)

== Passionist ==
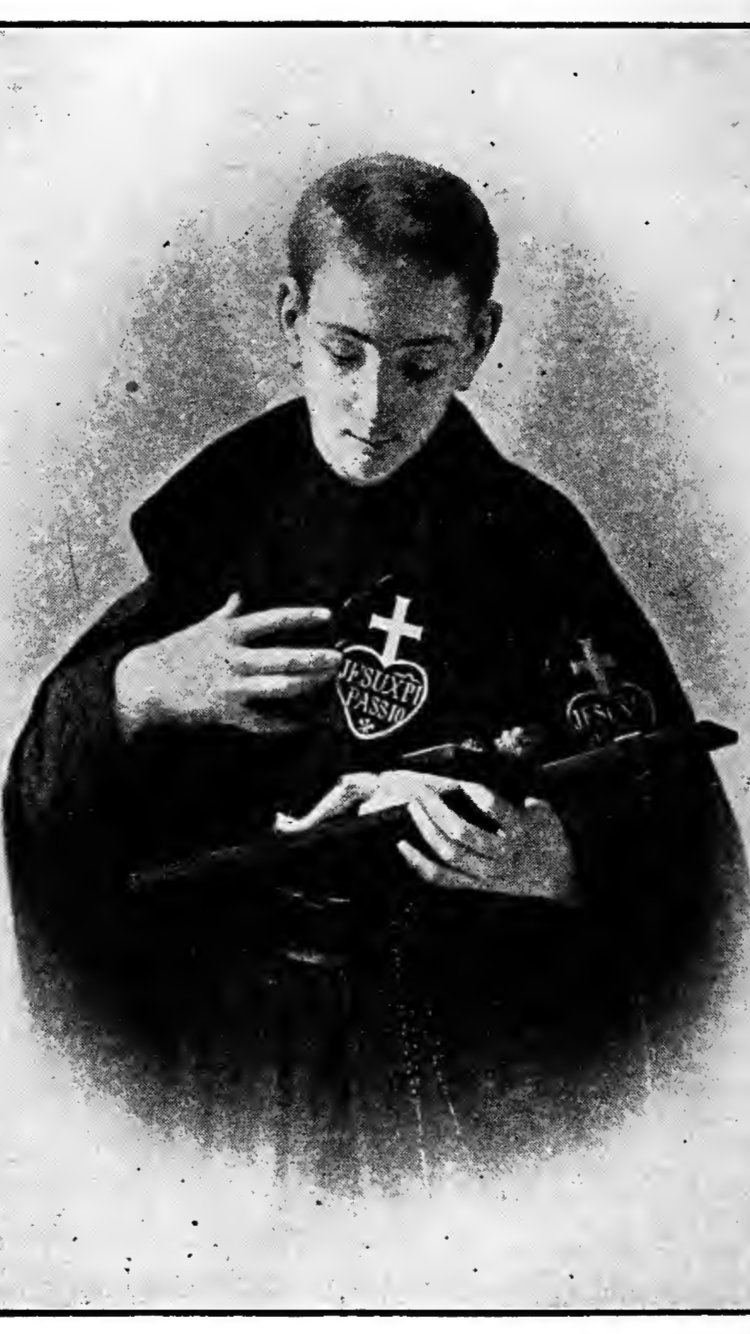
Saint Gabriel in his Passionist habit, after a painting by a certain Italian artist Professor Grandi. According to The Life of Blessed Gabriel of Our Lady of Sorrows, this painting was made from the descriptions of those who knew Gabriel best.

Accompanied by his brother Aloysius, a Dominican friar, Possenti set out for the novitiate of the Passionists at Morrovalle. During their journey they visited several relatives who had been enlisted by Sante to encourage Possenti to return to Spoleto, but this was to no avail. He arrived at the novitiate on 19 September 1856.

Two days later he received the habit of the Passionists and the name "Gabriel of Our Lady of Sorrows". The following year Possenti pronounced his vows. During this time, and indeed until his death, Possenti's spiritual life was under the care of his director, the priest Norbert of Holy Mary.

In June 1858 Possenti and the other students moved to Pietvetorina to continue their studies. Local disturbances meant they would stay only a year and, in July 1859, the group moved to the monastery of Isola del Gran Sasso in the province of Teramo.

Possenti proved an excellent student and his excellence in academic life was only outdone by the great progress he was making in his spiritual life. At the same time Possenti began to display the first symptoms of tuberculosis. The news did not worry Possenti who was, in fact, joyful; he had prayed for a slow death so as to be able to prepare himself spiritually. Throughout his illness he remained cheerful and kept up all his usual practices. He was a source of great edification and inspiration to his fellow students, who sought to spend time with him at his deathbed. Possenti had proved himself an exemplary religious and a perfect follower of the Passionist Rule, being especially devoted to the Virgin Mary. Toward whom his piety was particularly inflamed by his reading of The Glories of Mary by Saint Alphonsus Liguori.

On his deathbed he ordered his spiritual writings to be burnt for he feared they would tempt him to pride. Only his letters survive, alongside his 'Resolutions' which map the spiritual progress he made in his few years as a Passionist.

Before he could be ordained a priest, Possenti died in the retreat at Isola del Gran Sasso the early hours of 27 February 1862, in the presence of the community, holding close an image of Our Lady of Sorrows and smiling peacefully. Those who were with Possenti when he died reported that at the moment of death, he sat up in bed and his face became radiant as he reached out to an otherwise unseen figure that was entering the room. It was the opinion of Norbert that Possenti had seen the Virgin Mary at the very moment of his death.

== Canonization ==
Possenti was buried the day of his death. His companion in the novitiate, Bernard Mary of Jesus, exclaimed:

Tears come to my eyes and I am filled with shame for having been so far from the virtues that he attained in such a short time.

Immediately thereafter Norbert wrote a biography of his life. In 1866, four years after the death of Possenti, the Passionists were forced to abandon the monastery of Isola del Gran Sasso, and the church where Possenti lay buried went deserted for 30 years. Since his death, the fame of Possenti's sanctity had spread through the local area, as well as amongst the Passionists. In 1891 the Congregation decided to formally open proceedings for Possenti's canonisation and, a year later, a committee visited his grave to examine his remains. Upon the arrival of the committee at Isola del Gran Sasso, the townspeople surrounded the church, determined not to have the body of Possenti taken from their midst. Two years later the Passionists returned to resume their life at Isola del Gran Sasso near the city of Teramo.

The two miracles presented for the beatification of Gabriel were the inexplicable healings of Maria Mazzarella from pulmonary tuberculosis and periostitis, and the instantaneous cure of Dominic Tiber from an inoperable hernia. Possenti was beatified by Pope Pius X on 31 May 1908. Present at the ceremony were his brother Michael, his companion Sylvester, and his director, Norbert. The outbreak of the First World War delayed Possenti's canonisation for a while, but on 13 May 1920, he was raised to the altars by Pope Benedict XV.

== Patronage ==
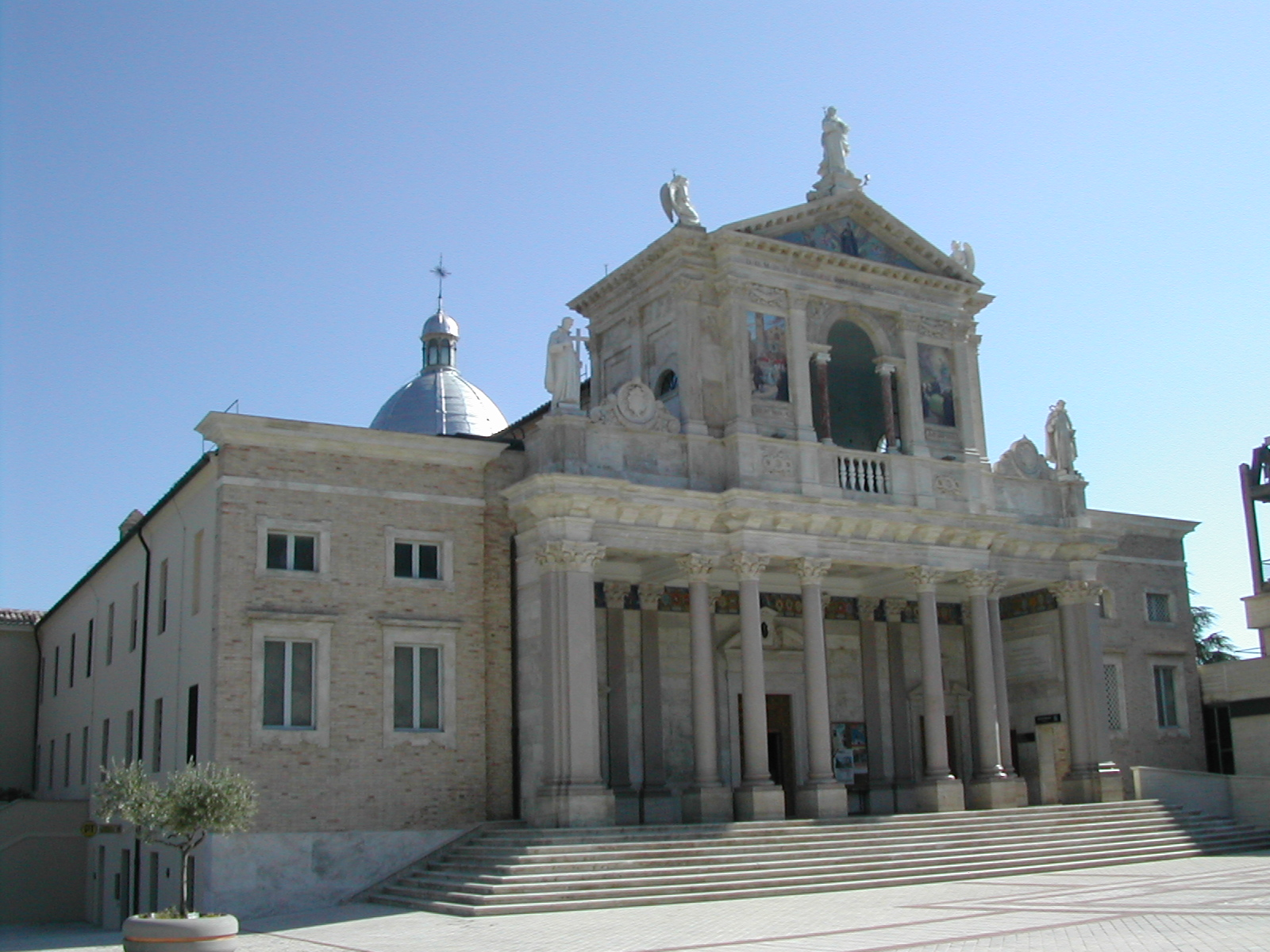
The Shrine of Saint Gabriel

At the canonization of Possenti, Pope Benedict XV declared him a patron saint of Catholic youth, of students, and of those studying for the priesthood. In 1959, Pope John XXIII named him the patron of the Abruzzi region, where he spent the last two years of his life.

Millions of pilgrims visit St. Gabriel's shrine in Isola del Gran Sasso d'Italia near Teramo each year to see Possenti's burial place and the monastic house in which he lived out his final years. There is an ongoing tradition every March, when thousands of high school students from the Abruzzo and the Marche regions of Italy visit his tomb 100 days before their expected graduation day and pray to him in order to achieve good scores on their final. Every two years, from mid-July to the beginning of October, the Italian Staurós ONLUS foundation hosts at the Sanctuary of Saint Gabriel, a celebrated exposition of contemporary religious arts. With an average of 2 million visitors per year, this is one of the 15 most visited sanctuaries in the world.

Saint Gabriel is especially popular amongst Italian youth; Italian migrants have spread their admiration of him to areas such as the United States, Central America and South America. The Passionist Congregation also spreads devotion to Possenti wherever they have monasteries. Many miracles have been attributed to Possenti's intercession; Gemma Galgani held that it was Possenti who had cured her of a dangerous illness and led her to a Passionist vocation.

== Saint Gabriel Possenti Society ==
The Saint Gabriel Possenti Society was a U.S. organization promoting the public recognition of Gabriel and lobbying for his designation by the Vatican as the "patron saint of hand gunners". The society was founded by gun lobbyist John M. Snyder, who began his effort in 1987.

According to the society, Gabriel's marksmanship and proficiency with handguns allegedly saved the village of Isola del Gran Sasso in 1860. This urban legend says that he scared away a band of 20 Garibaldi Red Shirts after shooting a lizard at a distance. Gabriel was reported to be in the later stages of tuberculosis at the time. (Note: This story is mentioned in one biography of Possenti, whose author states that some of the accounts in his book were included to "enliven" the story. The incident has been treated in tongue-in-cheek fashion as well.)

== See also ==
- Saint Gabriel of Our Lady of Sorrows, patron saint archive

== Sources ==
- Contains material from St Gabriel Lady of Our Sorrows with permission
