= Lorenzo Maria of Saint Francis Xavier =

19th-century Italian Catholic priest and saint

Blessed Lorenzo Maria of Saint Francis Xavier C.P.
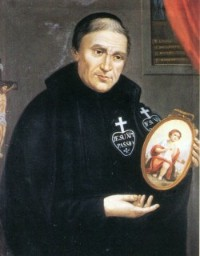
- Painting.

Priest
- Born: 30 October 1782; Rome, Papal States
- Died: 12 June 1856 (aged 73); Capranica, Viterbo, Papal States
- Venerated in: Roman Catholic Church
- Beatified: 1 October 1989, Saint Peter's Square, Vatican City by Pope John Paul II
- Major shrine: Chiesa di San Angelo, Vetralla, Viterbo, Italy
- Feast: 12 June
- Attributes: Passionist habit; Image of the Child Jesus

Lorenzo Maria of Saint Francis Xavier (30 October 1782 – 12 June 1856) – born Lorenzo Salvi – was an Italian Roman Catholic priest and a professed member of the Passionists. Salvi became friends with Gaspar del Bufalo and Bartolomeo Alberto Cappellari – future pope – during the course of his studies prior to his ordination. He was forced out of the Passionist house due to anti-clerical laws from Napoleon Bonaparte but later returned when safe to do so in order to preach and spread the charism of the Child Jesus.

Salvi was beatified on 1 October 1999.

== Life ==
Lorenzo Salvi was born in Rome on 30 October 1782 to Antonio Salvi and his first spouse Marianna Biondi. He was baptized in the church of San Eustachio in the names of "Lorenzo Gaetano Maria Salvi" and he received his Confirmation sometime later at Saint Peter's Basilica.

He studied for the priesthood at the Jesuit-run the Collegio Romano in Rome; his classmates included Bartolomeo Alberto Cappellari – future pope – and Gaspar del Bufalo. He was impressed with the solid preaching and the apostolic zeal of Vincent Strambi and soon followed him into the Passionist order.

He became a novice at Monte Argentario on 14 November 1801 (the first convent of the order) and he professed his vows on 20 November 1802 – and received the religious name of "Lorenzo Maria of Saint Francis Xavier. Salvi was later ordained to the priesthood on 29 December 1805 just after Christmas in Rome. The anti-clerical laws that Napoleon Bonaparte instituted saw the Passionist house suppressed and its members dispersed in 1810. He was soon able to return to Passionist life and he preached missions and encouraged devotion to the Passion of Christ.

He was devoted to the Infant Jesus and often wrote about and preached on the wonders of the Incarnation and this intensified after the Child Jesus was said to have healed him from a serious illness in 1812. He was made the rector of the Passionist motherhouse in Rome (Santi Giovanni e Paolo) but spent much of his time preaching missions; his vice-rector was Dominic Barberi. Barbieri noted Salvi's strength and evangelic zeal and so requested permission from the order's superior general to send him to England to preach but such permission was denied.

Salvi died at Capranica in Viterbo; his remains are interred in the Passionist church of San Angelo.

== Beatification ==
Salvi's theological and other spiritual writings received approval from theologians on two occasions on 14 December 1915 and on 3 February 1944. The introduction to the cause came under Pope Pius XI on 28 February 1923 and he became titled as a Servant of God. The postulation submitted the Positio in 1984 and theologians approved the cause on 29 September 1987 as did the C.C.S. on 15 December 1987; the confirmation of his life of heroic virtue allowed for Pope John Paul II to name him as Venerable on 8 February 1988.

John Paul II later beatified the Passionist priest on 1 October 1989.

The current postulator for this cause is the Passionist priest Giovanni Zubiani.
