= John M. Snyder =

United States gun lobbyist (1939–2017)

- Born: December 18, 1939
- Died: October 22, 2017 (aged 77)
- Other names: J. Nicholas Cannon (pseudonym)
- Occupation: Political Lobbyist
- Known for: Citizens Committee for the Right to Keep and Bear Arms

John M. Snyder (December 18, 1939 – October 22, 2017) was an American gun lobbyist, known to some supporters as "the dean of Washington gun lobbyists."

== Life ==
A former seminarian, Snyder held a degree in political science. He began working as a gun lobbyist after eight years working for the National Rifle Association of America (NRA), as editor of American Rifleman magazine. According to Snyder, he registered as a gun lobbyist before the NRA had its own operation lobbying the Capitol. In the early 1970s, he helped to found the Citizens Committee for the Right to Keep and Bear Arms (CCRKBA).

Since 1979, Snyder has sent annual, controversial Christmas cards to the President, Pope, members of Congress, and the U.S. media, featuring images combining Christian and Christmas-related symbols with guns, which received some media coverage.

== Saint Gabriel Possenti Society ==
In 1987, Snyder founded the Saint Gabriel Possenti Society to promote public recognition of Gabriel and to lobby for Gabriel's designation by the Vatican as the "patron saint of hand gunners".

According to the society, Gabriel's marksmanship and proficiency with handguns allegedly saved the village of Isola del Gran Sasso from a band of 20 marauding bandits in 1860. This refers to a story mentioned in one biography of the saint, though the author admitted that some of the accounts in his book were invented to "enliven" the story. No account of the event is present in any other independently researched biographies. Moreover, in 1860, at the time of the alleged incident, Gabriel was in the later stages of tuberculosis, which would have made such strenuous exercise impossible.

John McCaslin wrote that presidential candidate Pat Buchanan pledged to Snyder, "when I get to that White House, I'm gonna take that medallion you gave me—the patron saint of hand-gunners, Gabriel Possenti—and I'm gonna hang that in the Oval Office right along with Robert E. Lee's pistol!"

Snyder died on October 22, 2017, at the age of 77.

== See also ==
- Gun politics in the United States
