= Marie-Julie Jahenny =

Breton mystic and stigmatist

- Marie-Julie Jahenny late in life
- Born: 12 February 1850; Coyault (Blain, Loire-Atlantique)
- Died: 4 March 1941 (aged 91); La Fraudais (Blain, Loire-Atlantique)
- Known for: Purple Scapular; The mystic of La Fraudais

Unofficial Saint Marie-Julie Jahenny
- Venerated in: Palmarian Catholic Church
- Canonized: 17 September 1978, Cathedral-Basilica of Our Crowned Mother of Palmar, El Palmar de Troya, Spain by Gregory XVII

Marie-Julie Jahenny (Breton pronunciation: [maˈʁiː ʒyˈliː ʒaɛˈniː], 12 February 1850 – 4 March 1941) was a Breton Catholic woman known as a mystic and stigmatist. She is associated with the purple scapular.

== Life ==
Marie-Julie Jahenny was born the eldest of five children born to peasants Charles and Marie Boya Jahenny. She later joined the Third Order of Saint Francis.

Jahenny reported that on February 22, 1873, she experienced an apparition of Mary. From the age of twenty-three until her death, she bore the stigmata and suffered attacks from the devil. She also allegedly experienced extraordinary periods of fasting, and had the gift of prophecy and miracles.

During her life, she reported several apparitions of the Blessed Virgin Mary and Jesus Christ through which she purportedly received prophecies about the end of the world, punishment for the sins of the people, the destruction of Paris through civil war, and the coming of the Antichrist.

Jahenny's reported prophecies also included predictions of divine chastisements affecting France and elsewhere in the world, including natural disasters, disease, political upheavel, and persecution of the Catholic Church. Her revelations also drew on themes from traditional Catholic apocalyptic prophecy, including the Three Days of Darkness and the coming of the Great Monarch. Some of her supported Henri, Count of Chambord as future king.

She also had visions of the Angelic Pontiff who would reign at the same time of the Great Monarch, and that both these great leaders were destined to restore the Catholic Church. Her house has been transformed into a sanctuary, which bears her name, in Blain, near Nantes where she is buried in the cemetery.

In her apparitions, Jahenny was told to promote a Purple Scapular, which was to be displayed in homes and worn to provide protection during the End Times and the Three Days of Darkness.

== See also ==
- Visions of Jesus and Mary

== Sources ==
- Marquis de La Franquerie Saint Remi, thaumaturge Apôtre et des Francs. 1981. ISBN 2-84519-427-7 .
- "We Are Warned: The Prophecies of Marie-Julie Jahenny" (December 1, 2011). PDF E-Book on Academia.edu:
- 'Marie-Julie Jahenny, the 'Breton' Stigmatist: Her Life and Prophecies.' Article:Mystics of the Church
