= Bernard Mary of Jesus =

Italian priest (1831–1911)

Blessed Bernardo Maria of Jesus C.P.
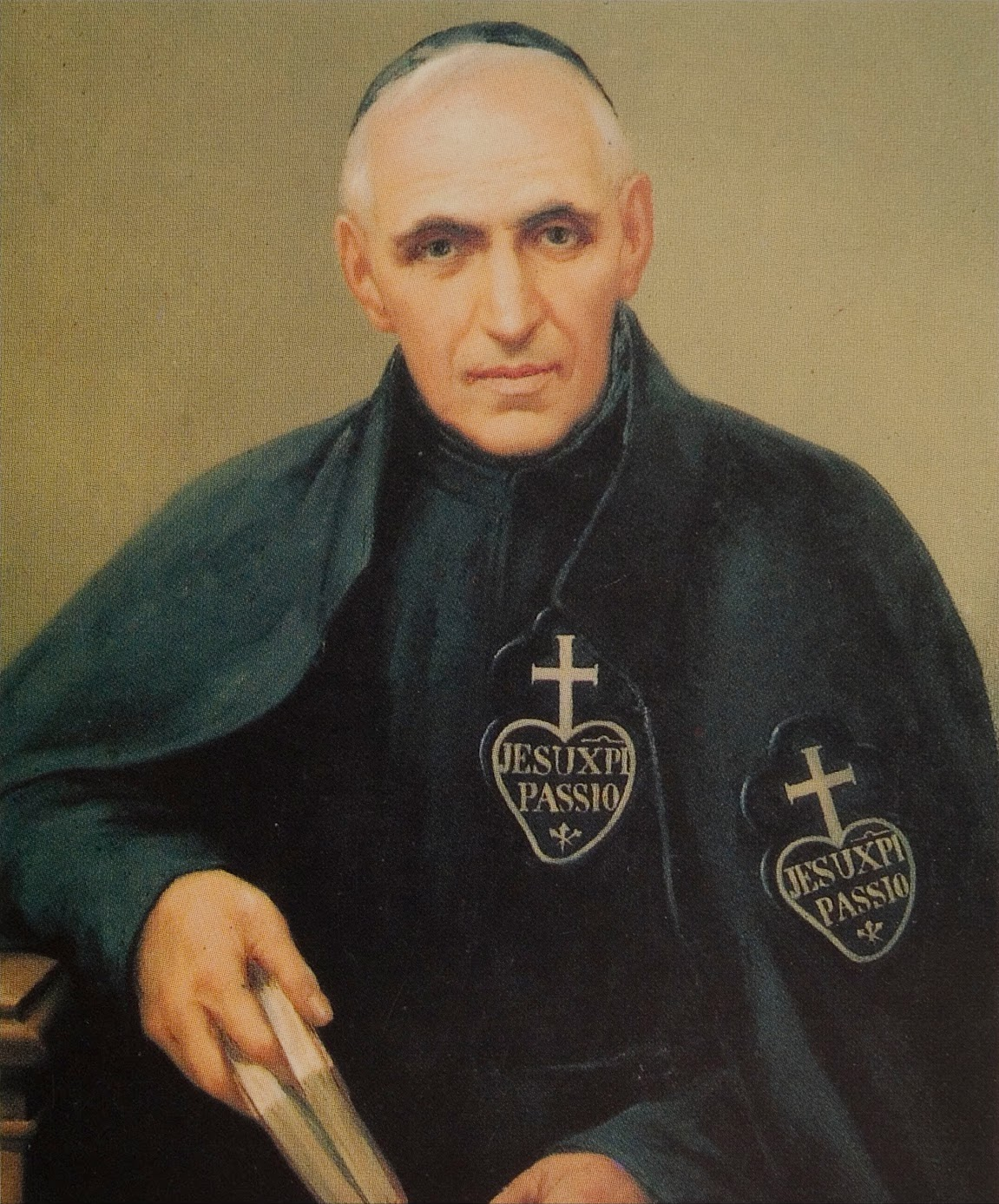

Priest
- Born: 7 November 1831; Rome, Papal States
- Died: 9 December 1911 (aged 80); Moricone, Rome, Kingdom of Italy
- Venerated in: Roman Catholic Church
- Beatified: 16 October 1988, Saint Peter's Square, Vatican City by Pope John Paul II
- Feast: 9 December
- Attributes: Passionist habit

Bernardo Maria di Gesù (7 November 1831 – 9 December 1911), born as Cesare Silvestrelli, was an Italian Roman Catholic priest and a professed member of the Passionists. He entered the novitiate for a brief period under a different religious name though ill health forced him to leave but did not hinder him from still training and living alongside the Passionists. He re-entered the order after his ordination and went on to hold several positions of leadership within his own order; he was even likened to Saint Paul of the Cross while Pope Leo XIII and Pope Pius X held him in high esteem.

His beatification was celebrated on 16 October 1988 in Saint Peter's Square and his liturgical feast is affixed to the date of his death as is the custom.

== Life ==
=== Education and priesthood ===
Cesare Silvestrelli was born on 7 November 1831 in Rome as the third of seven children to the nobles Gian Tommaso Silvestrelli (d. 1853) and Teresa Gozzani (d. 1846) and were residents of the Piazza della Minerva since their residence was at no. 38; he was baptized just hours after his birth in the names Cesare Pietro at Santa Maria sopra Minerva. His brother was Luigi (d. 20 September 1867). His father's funeral saw the attendance of 120 Franciscans and 40 Capuchins as well as 40 Dominicans.

He did his initial education first at the Jesuit-run Roman College (1840–47) and thereafter continued his studies at an institute at the Caravita Oratorio in addition to a series of private schools. He was attracted to the Passionist charism and entered their order on 21 February 1854 (at Santi Giovanni e Paolo) before being admitted into their novitiate at their San Giuseppe convent in Monte Argentario on 25 March 1854. He received the religious habit and was given the name "Luigi del Sacro Cuore di Maria" on 7 April 1854. But he was forced to leave the novitiate on 3 May due to ill health though continued living with the Passionists in another house in the same town while he did theological studies. He did those studies under Father Pacifico di San Giuseppe and from 31 June to 24 August 1855 lived at Santi Giovanni e Paolo.

Silvestrelli received his ordination to the priesthood on 22 December 1855 (as a diocesan priest rather than one in the religious life) from Bishop Giuseppe-Maria Molajoni. He then decided to re-enter the order and so sent another application before being accepted. On 1 April 1856 he entered the novitiate once again though this time at Morrovalle where he re-assumed the habit and the new religious name "Bernardo Maria di Gesù". It was here that he was the classmate of fellow novice Francesco Possenti. He made his final profession on 28 April 1857. Thereafter he pursued studies for preaching and once that was finished he was assigned first as the director of students at Morrovalle (1860-1864) and then as the Master of Novices at the Passionist convent of Scala Santa (adjacent to the Basilica of St. John Lateran in Rome) from January 1865 until 1869.

=== Leadership ===
His brother Luigi died on September 20, 1867, and he was present at his brother's bedside as he died; he attended the funeral on 23 September at Santa Maria sopra Minerva. He was then appointed as the rector of the Scala Santa convent and held that position from 27 May 1869 until 1875 after being confirmed on 14 April 1872. It was here that - on 19 September 1870 - Pope Pius IX visited the steps from which the convent assumed its name. The pope was making his last visit to the sacred sites of Rome before the dissolution of the Papal States. Silvestrilli supported the Pope through holding onto his arm as both men climbed the steps weeping together.

On 7 June 1875 he was elected as the first Provincial Consulter of the Roman province (he moved to Vetralla around this stage for a brief period) and he later became the Vice-Provincial Superior in July 1876. In the General Chapter on 4 May 1878 he was elected as the Superior General of the order. and his first term ran until 1884. In this position he worked hard to reconcile rival factions in the order and also founded new houses abroad (more so in Latin America as well as advancing the Bulgarian mission) and reformed the regulations of the order; he was firm in the conviction that a return to the original spirit and the Rule of the founder could be the singular formula for reviving the spirit of the charism. In 1887 he accepted a request from Cardinal Francis Patrick Moran to send Passionists to Australia in 1887.

He was re-elected as Superior General in 1884 and resigned from the position on 2 January 1889 after making his decision in 1888. In 1893 a vision of his former classmate Possenti convinced him to attend the General Chapter and he was then once more elected as the Superior General (on 3 May) which was a post to which he was re-elected again in 1899 (in the first vote) and on 8 May 1905 (in the first vote). He attended a retreat at Monte Argentario in August 1890 and dwelt in the smallest cell while spending long periods of time before the Eucharist in adoration. He established an international house of studies for Passionist students at Santi Giovanni e Paolo in Rome and visited all the Passionist provinces in the world including a visit to the United States of America in 1896. It was around this stage that he developed arthrosis of the spine that made leg and neck movement difficult for him. He resigned again on 7 July 1907 (for the final time) which Pope Pius X accepted but the pope named him as an "Onorario Generale" for life due to his great service while in office and also as a sign of the pope's esteem. He was often praised as a second Paul of the Cross and even Pope Leo XIII and Pius X regarded him high enough to offer him the cardinalate several times despite his humble refusals.

=== Death ===
On 16 June 1911 he retired to the Passionist convent in Moricone and died there on 9 December 1911 after he fell backwards down a set of stairs as he was ascending. His remains were later exhumed and moved to the Moricone convent on 17 April 1931.

== Beatification ==
Silvestrelli's spiritual writings were approved by theologians on 28 May 1941. Pope Pius XII formally opened his cause on 13 February 1942, granting him the title of Servant of God. Pope Paul VI named him as Venerable on 18 October 1973. Pope John Paul II later beatified Silvestrelli on 16 October 1998 in Saint Peter's Square.

The current postulator for the cause is the Passionist priest Giovanni Zubiani.
