= Edward L. Beck =

American Catholic priest

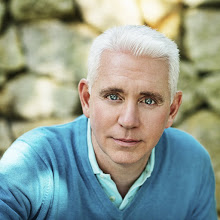
Portrait of Father Edward Beck

Edward L. Beck, C.P. is an author, journalist, and Catholic priest of the Passionist congregation.

== Career ==
Father Edward Beck is an on-air contributor and media commentator for CNN (2014-2023) on issues of faith, religion and ethics, and has written three books. He is also located part time at Manhattan University with the Campus Ministry.

Beck attended Xaverian High School, Brooklyn, and started his college studies at Brooklyn College prior to transferring to Assumption College/Holy Cross College (MA) where he received a BA in Religious Studies and a minor in Philosophy. He has a Master's in Christian Spirituality and a Certification as a Spiritual Director from Creighton University, Omaha, Nebraska. Father Beck served as the Parochial Vicar of Union City, NJ; the Formation Director of the Passionists, Philadelphia; a preacher of Parish Retreats; and the Executive Producer of The Sunday Mass for television.

Prior to working at CNN, he was a media contributor for ABC News, CBS News, Fox News, HLN and MSNBC. He co-hosted Focus on Faith with Chris Cuomo for ABC News from 2009 to 2014. Beck also leads retreats and workshops on spirituality. He is located in New York.

== Books published as author ==
- God Underneath: Spiritual Memoirs of a Catholic Priest, Doubleday, 2001. ISBN 978-0-385-50181-1
- Unlikely Ways Home: Real-Life Spiritual Detours, Doubleday, 2004. ISBN 978-0-385-50859-9
- Soul Provider: Spiritual Steps to Limitless Love, Doubleday, 2007. ISBN 978-0-385-51552-8

== As a playwright ==
Sweetened Water, created by Beck staged reading starring Vanessa Williams and Amy Brenneman at Playwrights Horizons theater in New York City, January 2015, and an Equity production in the summer of 2015 at Martha's Vineyard Playhouse in Vineyard Haven, Massachusetts. Subsequent readings featured Laila Robins, Josh Lucas, Sean Cullen, Nathan Darrow, Tricia Paoluccio and Meghann Fahy. Father Edward Beck is currently (April 2026) developing another play, Ungodly Pursuit with multiple readings and a soon to be production.
