= Vincent Strambi =

Italian Roman Catholic saint

Saint Vincent Strambi CP
- Bishop Emeritus of Macerata-Tolentino
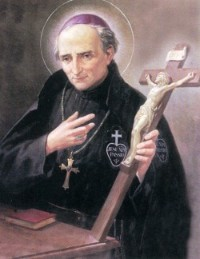
- Church: Roman Catholic Church
- Diocese: Macerata-Tolentino
- See: Macerata-Tolentino
- Appointed: 20 July 1801
- Term ended: 11 November 1823
- Predecessor: Alessandro Alessandretti
- Successor: Francesco Ansaldo Teloni

Orders
- Ordination: 19 December 1767
- Consecration: 26 July 1801 by Leonardo Antonelli
- Rank: Bishop

Personal details
- Born: Vincenzo Domenico Salvatore Strambi; 1 January 1745 Civitavecchia, Papal States
- Died: 1 January 1824 (aged 79) Rome, Papal States

Sainthood
- Feast day: 1 January
- Venerated in: Roman Catholic Church
- Beatified: 26 April 1925; Saint Peter's Basilica, Kingdom of Italy by Pope Pius XI
- Canonized: 11 June 1950; Saint Peter's Basilica, Vatican City by Pope Pius XII
- Attributes: Passionist habit; Episcopal attire; Crucifix
- Patronage: Diocese of Macerata-Tolentino
- Shrines: Church of San Filippo, Macerata, Italy

Vincenzo Strambi, religious name Vincenzo Maria di San Paolo; 1 January 1745 — 1 January 1824) was an Italian Passionist. He was appointed prelate and served as the Bishop of Macerata-Tolentino from 1801 until his resignation in 1823.

Strambi entered at the Passionists despite the congregation's founder, Paul of the Cross, refusing him several times due to Strambi's frail constitution. He practiced Passionist austerities, which continued after his appointment as a bishop, including him favoring his habit rather than the usual episcopal garb. Strambi was known for his charitable projects that included the care of the poor and the reduction of diocesan expenditures in order to provide for them; he took special interests in the education and ongoing formation of priests.

Strambi was exiled from his diocese 1808 after he refused to take an oath of allegiance to the First French Empire under Napoleon, who had annexed Macerata. Strambi spent that time in Novara and Milan before he managed to return to his see in 1814. He served as bishop for the remainder of the pontificate of Pope Pius VII before his successor Pope Leo XII accepted Strambi's resignation and summoned him to Rome as his advisor. A sudden illness of the pope—which seemed to be mortal—prompted Strambi to offer his own life to God so that the pope could live. Leo XII rallied to great surprise but Strambi died of a stroke within the week.

Strambi's beatification cause was opened after his death on 25 June 1845 and he was named venerable on 1 April 1894. Pope Pius XI beatified Strambi in 1925 and Pope Pius XII canonized him a couple of decades later, in 1950.

== Life ==
=== Education and priesthood ===
Vincenzo Strambi was born in 1745 in Civitavecchia as the last of four children to Giuseppe Strambi and Eleonora Gori; his three elder siblings all died in childhood. His father served as a pharmacist known for his charitable works and his mother was noted for her piety.

He was often a troublesome child who excelled in athletics and became more devout in his adolescence. The Friars Minor oversaw his education and he taught his fellow students the catechism. His desire to become a priest was met with encouragement from his parents and he commenced his ecclesial studies in November 1762. It was at this time that he became quite attracted to the notion of the religious life though his frail health saw him refused admission into the Order of Friars Minor Capuchin and the Vincentians. Strambi was noted for his oratorical gifts and so was sent to Rome for studies in Sacred Eloquence and thereafter continued his theological studies with the Dominicans at Viterbo. While still a student he was appointed prefect of the seminarians in Montefiascone and thereafter acting-rector of seminarians at Bagnorea.

Before his ordination to the priesthood he made a retreat at the convent in Vetralla which belonged to the Passionists; it was here that he met the founder St Paul of the Cross. Strambi became impressed and enthralled with what he had seen and admired their ardent devotion. This made him ask the founder to be admitted into the order. But he was refused since Paul of the Cross believed that Strambi did not have the stamina for the Passionist life. Strambi left the convent on 18 December 1767 since he was to be ordained.

He was received into the diaconate in Bagnoregio on 14 March 1767. Strambi was ordained to the priesthood on 19 December 1767 and then returned to Rome to further his theological studies. Here he was noted for his studies of the life and works of Saint Thomas Aquinas. He still felt called to the Passionists and made several trips to see Paul of the Cross to beg to be admitted into the order. In September 1768 the founder relented and Strambi commenced his novitiate assuming the name in secolo Vincenzo Maria di San Paolo. His parents were not too pleased with this and his father objected to the decision citing his son's frail health as a sign that Strambi would die due to the rigid penances. He made his profession on 24 September 1769 and continued his studies with a particular emphasis on the Church Fathers and on Sacred Scripture.

Strambi preached missions – a focal point of the Passionist charism — and drew large crowds due to the effectiveness of his preaching. There were even several occasions where he preached before bishops and cardinals. In 1773 he was made a professor of theological studies at the order's house in Rome — at Santi Giovanni e Paolo — and it was here that he was present at the death of Paul of the Cross. The founder said to Strambi on his deathbed: "You will do great things! You will do great good!" It was after this that he occupied several high offices in the order such as the rector of the Roman house and the provincial for the Roman province. In 1784 he was relieved of these duties in order to write a biographical account of Paul of the Cross which was later published in London (Blessed Dominic Barberi wrote the preface). The Napoleonic invasion in the Papal States and the anti-religious decrees forced Strambi to flee Rome in 1798, though it was in vain as the French forces in May 1799 took him prisoner. He managed to return to Rome not long after this.

=== Episcopate ===
The death of Pope Pius VI saw his friend Cardinal Leonardo Antonelli nominate him for the papal see and he even received five votes in the conclave. 1801, the new Pope Pius VII appointed Strambi as the Bishop of Macerata-Tolentino and he became the first bishop to come from the Passionists. This news — before it was made public — surprised and frightened him and he rushed to Rome in an effort to get the appointment cancelled before it was publicized. Even his good friend Cardinal Antonelli counselled him to accept the nomination for the welfare of the Church. Strambi took his case to the pope who listened and told Strambi the decision to name him a bishop was "a divine inspiration" he was firm on. Cardinal Antonelli presided over his episcopal consecration at Santi Giovanni e Paolo. But he continued to wear his Passionist habit in private despite his higher office. His episcopate was marked with a concern for the poor and he even begged on their behalf on occasion. He took great care in the education of diocesan priests and paid close attention to the teaching standards in the diocesan seminaries. His charitable works included the establishment of orphanages and homes for the aged. He still practiced the frugalities the Passionists advocated and this applied to his living and eating habits: he never did permit more than two dishes for his meals.

In 1809, Napoleon issued a decree that annexed Macerata as part of the French Empire. The French ordered that this decree be read in all churches but Strambi refused to do so. He also refused to provide the French with a list of all the men in his diocese who would be suitable for service in the armed forces. The French arrested him in September 1808 for refusing to take the oath of allegiance to the French invaders and was then exiled and cut off from his diocese. He was first sent to Novara but was sent in October 1809 to Milan where he spent the remainder of his exile as a guest of the Barnabites. He returned to his see in 1814 with vast crowds lining the route of his return. Pius VII had returned from his own exile and remarked:

"This holy man overwhelms me".

The invaders had left much damage in their wake — not just destruction to infrastructure — but a lax sense of morals and values which Strambi worked hard to rebuild. He instituted strict reforms that ended corruption to the point where he received some death threats. Strambi was also the spiritual director of Anna Maria Taigi, a friend, as well as Ss. Gaspare del Bufalo and Vincent Pallotti.

But the French returned to Macerata in 1817, to set up their headquarters aiming to use that location to attack the Austrian forces. The people turned to Bishop Strambi for fear of what the French would do. His response was to gather priests and seminarians in his private chapel to beg for God's intercession and after one and a half hours he rose and declared that Macerata would be saved through the intercession of the Mother of God. The French were indeed defeated though the local people feared what would happen during their retreat. Strambi met with the leader of the French forces and begged him not to enter the town to which General Murat agreed. Strambi then secured the assurances of the Austrian generals that the French soldiers would not be slaughtered.

He was a close friend of Carlo Odescalchi and was pleased to learn that the pope named him as a cardinal on 10 March 1823. Strambi tried several times to secure his resignation from Pius VII but on one occasion the pope reprimanded him for using ill health as a vain excuse and dismissed him. Strambi tried once again in 1823 in a letter to Cardinal Ercole Consalvi to the pope but the letter arrived in Rome when the pontiff broke his thigh in a fall and died soon after.

=== Declining health and death ===
In 1823 his health started to decline and Pope Leo XII gave him his permission to retire. He was then appointed as Leo XII's personal advisor and took up residence at the Quirinal Palace in Rome. It was during his time in this office that Napoleon's sister Pauline returned to the faith with Strambi's guidance. Strambi's last private aide around this stage was Monsignor Catervo Serrani. When the pope fell ill he asked God that his life should be taken rather than that of the pope. The pope recovered on 24 December 1823 and Strambi died in 1824 within the week due to a stroke he had suffered on the previous 27 December. His remains were placed at the Quirinal Palace for mourners to see and was then buried in the Santi Giovanni e Paolo church. Mourners who viewed his mortal remains included Cardinal Bartolomeo Alberto Cappellari — future pope Gregory XVI — who took Strambi's right hand in his own and formed it with the greatest of ease into the sign of the cross. His remains were later transferred on 12 November 1957 to the Chiesa di San Filippo in Macerata.

== Veneration ==
The cause for Strambi's beatification opened on a diocesan level for the collection of testimonies and documents in relation to his life and his episcopal works. The formal introduction did not come until 25 June 1845 when he was named as a Servant of God. The recognition of his life of heroic virtue led Pope Leo XIII to name him as venerable on 1 April 1894.

Pope Pius XI presided over the beatification rites on 26 April 1925 and signed a decree on 25 November that allowed the cause to continue. Pope Pius XII canonized Strambi in Saint Peter's Basilica on 11 June 1950.
