= Anna Maria Taigi =

Beatified Roman Catholic Italian (1769–1837)

Blessed Anna Maria Taigi OSST
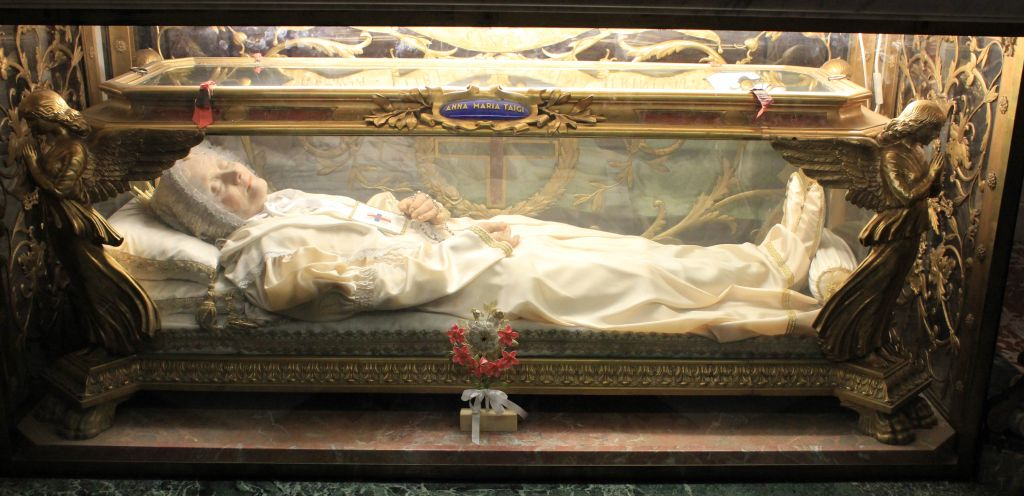
- Born: 29 May 1769; Siena, Grand Duchy of Tuscany
- Died: 9 June 1837 (aged 68); Rome, Papal States
- Resting place: San Crisogono, Rome, Italy
- Venerated in: Roman Catholic Church
- Beatified: 30 May 1920 by Pope Benedict XV
- Feast: 9 June
- Attributes: Trinitarian habit

Anna Maria Taigi (née Giannetti; 29 May 1769 – 9 June 1837) was an Italian Catholic professed member from the Secular Trinitarians. Taigi reportedly experienced a series of ecstasies during her life and heard the voices of God and Jesus Christ on several occasions.

She became a Secular Trinitarian after experiencing a sudden religious conversion in the winter of 1790 at Saint Peter's Basilica, when Taigi came into contact with a range of cardinals and luminaries, including Vincent Strambi and Benedict Joseph Flaget.

Her beatification process was opened in 1863 under Pope Pius IX, granting her the title Servant of God, and Pope Benedict XV beatified her in 1920.

== Life ==
=== Childhood and education ===
Anna Maria Giannetti was born in Siena, Italy on May 29, 1769, as an only child to Luigi Giannetti and Maria Masi. On May 30, 1769, she was baptized in her local parish church as "Anna Maria Gesualda Antonia Giannetti".

Her father served as a pharmacist in a small store in Siena. However, he lost his fortune. In 1774, the family moved to Rome where Luigi found work as a household servant. From 1774 to 1776, Anna Maria attended a school, managed by the Filippini Sisters. After graduation, she worked as a domestic servant to help provide for her family. While living in Rome, she was nicknamed "Annette". In 1780, she received her Confirmation in the Archbasilica of Saint John Lateran and, in 1782, received her First Holy Communion in her parish church of San Francesco di Paola.

=== Marriage ===
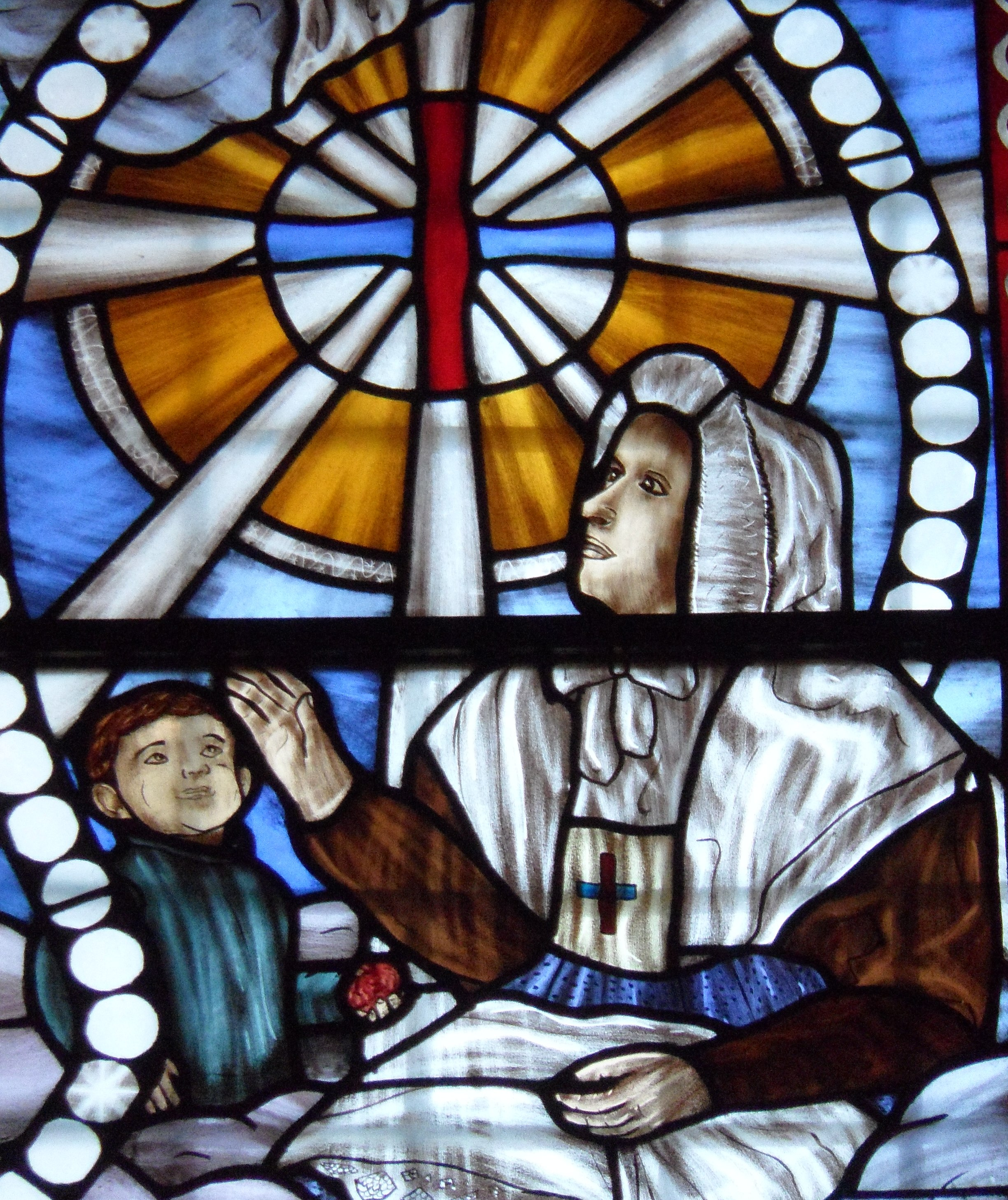
Stained glass depicting Anna at San Tommaso in Formis

On January 7, 1789, Anna Maria married the Milanese Domenico Taigi (1761–1850s). Domenico served as a butler for the noble House of Chigi in the church of San Marcello al Corso. The couple had seven children, three of whom died in infancy.

When Sofia was about to be married, her fiancée, Micali, was allowed to frequent the house. For two months prior to the marriage the couple could meet, but only in the presence of her parents. Sofia's son, Camillo, was conscripted into the armed service. When Sofia was widowed, Taigi allowed Sofia and her six children to move into her home.

Although Taigi's husband, Domenico, could be ill-tempered and caustic, he was devoted to his wife. After her father died, Taigi's mother moved in with the family. In winter 1790, Taigi and Domenico visited Saint Peter's Basilica. She was leaning on his arm in an extravagant dress. A large throng saw her bump into the Servite priest, Father Angelo Verandi, in the piazza. Taigi went to confession and felt a strong inspiration to renounce her vanities. She cried to the priest: "Father; you have at your feet a great sinner." The priest replied, "Go away; you are not one of my penitents." Finally, the priest relented and allowed Anna Maria to confess. After he absolved her, the priest curtly slammed the confessional slide shut. On another occasion, Taigi entered the church of San Andrea della Valle. Before the Crucifix, Taigi reported hearing the voice of Jesus Christ, "What is your wish? To follow Jesus poor and naked and stripped of all? Or to follow Him in His triumph and glory? Which do you choose?" Taigi replied, "I embrace the cross of my Jesus. I will carry it like Him in pain and ignominy. I await at His hands triumph and glory in the hereafter."

On December 26, 1802, Taigi became a professed member of the Secular Trinitarians in the church of San Carlo alle Quattro Fontane. She frequented hospitals and especially liked to visit and aid patients at San Giacomo of the Incurables. Taigi experienced a series of ecstasies and frequent visions in which she foresaw the future. She knew a range of religious individuals, including Cardinal Carlo Maria Pedicini. Their friendship lasted three decades. One evening, Taigi drifted off to sleep with a serene expression on her face. Her eyes drifted upwards, towards Heaven, which alarmed her daughter, Maria, who tearfully proclaimed, "Mamma is dead; Mamma is dead." Her sister, Sofia, corrected Maria, "No! She is praying," but Domenico said to them, "Be quiet! She's asleep. Leave her alone. She had no sleep last night." Before Taigi died, she met with the first Bishop of Louisville Benedict Joseph Flaget. She praised the bishop and the United States of America. Napoleon's mother, Letizia Ramolino, learned of Taigi and sought her spiritual advice. Some of Taigi's spiritual advisors were Raffaele Natali (1780–1871) (the secretary of Pope Pius VII), and Vincent Strambi.

=== Later life ===
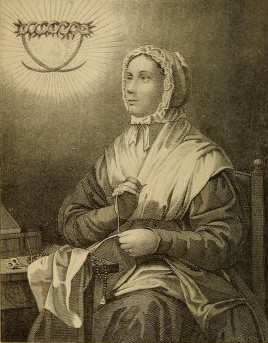
Image from the book The life of the Venerable Anna Maria Taigi, the Roman matron by Edward Healy Thompson

Taigi became acquainted with Cardinal Luigi Ercolani, and Giovanni Maria Mastai Ferretti who would become Pope Pius IX. Pope Pius VII often asked Strambi how Taigi was doing and would send his blessings to her. Pope Leo XII and Giuseppe Bartolomeo Menocchio both held her in high esteem. Taigi composed a prayer to the Blessed Virgin Mary. Pedicini took this prayer to Pius VII who, in a rescript on 6 March 1809, granted an indulgence. For 100 days, those who recited it, a plenary indulgence once a month on the usual conditions.

Taigi attended the 1825 Jubilee which Pope Leo XII had summoned. She knew of the latter pope's ill health. Before he died, in 1829, she saw the morning sun and prayed for him. Taigi heard a heavenly voice say, "Arise and pray. My vicar is on the point of coming to render an account to me." Pope Leo's successor Pope Pius VIII lived in the shadow of ill health. Taigi foresaw his death and prayed for his soul as she did with his predecessor. She had predicted the pontificate of Pius VIII would be a short one.

She successfully foresaw that Cardinal Bartolomeo Alberto Cappellari would be elected as Pope Gregory XVI. Before Pius VIII died, Taigi and Natali went to San Paolo fuori le Mura. When Cappellari arrived, she was in a small chapel which the Natali tried to have her vacate for the cardinal. Taigi would not leave. Cappellari told Natali not to disturb her so the Natali went to kneel elsewhere in reflection. When Taigi emerged, she fixated her eyes on Cappellari. When Natali asked why she was doing that, she frankly responded, "That is the future pope."

=== Final year and death ===
On 20 May 1836, Taigi went to San Paolo fuori le Mura. She had confided in Natali this would be her final visit there. Natali celebrated Mass with her before reflecting in front of the crucifix. On 24 October 1836, Taigi fell ill. She was confined to her bed and would never rise again. On 2 June 1837, her fever slightly declined but a few days later, her fever rose. On June 5, Taigi bid farewell to those who visited her bedside. On June 8, she received the last rites of Extreme Unction.

Taigi received the Viaticum and the Anointing of the Sick from the local curate. On 9 June 1837 at 4 am she died. Pedicini sent a letter at once to Cardinal Carlo Odescalchi to inform him of her death. Taigi's remains were exposed until June 11 in the church of Santa Maria in Via Lata. Natali asked for a death mask to be made before her burial. She was buried at Campo Verano where, on the orders of Pope Gregory XVI, her remains were enclosed in a leaden sepulcher with seals affixed to it. Odescalchi asked Natali to compile all documents so that Luquet could publish her biography. Pedicini was a frequent visitor to Taigi's tomb. The Capuchin Cardinal Ludovico Micara always kept an image of her on his person. The Minim priest Bernardo Clausi said of Taigi, "If she is not in Heaven, there is no room there for anybody." Vincent Pallotti praised her after she died for her saintliness and life of holiness.

It was learned that Taigi had wanted to be buried in San Crisogono Rome. So, on 18 August 1865, Taigi's relics were transferred there. In 1868, her remains were found intact; however, her clothes had decayed and were replaced. In 1920, her remains were found no longer incorrupt.

== Beatification ==
In 1852, in Rome, the beatification opened in an informative process. On March 4, 1906, the confirmation of Taigi's heroic virtue allowed for Pope Pius X to name her as venerable.

A total of 30 witnesses were summoned to testify for the cause. Included were her two daughters as well as many cardinals and bishops. Taigi's 92 year-old husband, Domenico, testified in favor. His shoulders were hunched and he leaned on a walking stick.

Two of her miracles (required for Taigi's beatification) were investigated and validated. On July 27, 1909, approval was received by an antepreparatory congregation. On April 5, 1910, approval was received by a preparatory committee. On December 3, 1918, approval was received by a general congregation. On January 6, 1919, Pope Benedict XV approved the two miracles. On May 30, 1920, the Pope presided over Taigi's beatification in Saint Peter's Basilica. The cause for her sainthood was opened on June 9, 1926. The postulator assigned to the cause is Javier Carnerero Peñalver.
