= Passionists =

Catholic religious order

Congregation of the Passion of Jesus Christ
- Congregatio Passionis Iesu Christi
- Abbreviation: CP
- Nickname: Passionists
- Founded: 22 November 1720; 305 years ago
- Founder: Paul of the Cross
- Founded at: Castellazzo, Italy
- Type: Clerical Religious Congregation of Pontifical Right for men
- Headquarters: Casa Generalizia, Piazza dei Ss. Giovanni e Paolo,13, Rome, Italy
- Members: 1,890 members (including 1,423 priests) as of 2020
- Superior General: Fr. Giuseppe Adobati, C.P.
- Patroness: The Sorrowful Virgin Mary
- Affiliations: Catholic Church
- Website: passiochristi.org
- Formerly called: The Poor of Jesus (1720–1741)

The Passionists, officially named the Congregation of the Passion of Jesus Christ (Latin: Congregatio Passionis Iesu Christi), abbreviated CP, are a Catholic clerical religious congregation of pontifical right for men, founded by Paul of the Cross in 1720, with a special emphasis on and devotion to the Passion of Jesus Christ. A known symbol of the congregation is the labeled emblem of the Sacred Heart of Jesus, surmounted by a cross. This symbol is often sewn into the habit of its congregants.

== History ==
Paul of the Cross, who was born in 1694 in Ovada, wrote the rules of the Congregation between 22 November 1720 and 1 January 1721. On 7 June 1725, Pope Benedict XIII granted Paul permission to form his congregation. Paul and his brother, John Baptist Danei, were ordained by the pope on the same occasion.

After serving for a time in the hospital for skin diseases of St. Gallicano, in 1737 they left Rome with permission of the pope and went to Mount Argentario, where they established the first house of the institute. They took up their abode in a small hermitage near the summit of the mount, to which was attached a chapel dedicated to Saint Anthony. They were soon joined by three companions, one of whom was a priest, and the observance of community life according to the rules began there and is continued there to the present day. Paul of the Cross and his companions – now totalling six priests and two brothers – began a retreat.

In 1769, Clement XIV granted full rights to the Passionists as enjoyed by the other religious institutes, making them not an order but a congregation. The congregation historically has had two primary goals: Preaching Missions and contemplative life, with an attempt to blend the two. Its founder had attempted to combine aspects of the contemplative orders, such as the Trappist monks, together with the dynamic orders, such as the Jesuits.

Both the members and the works of the congregation are entrusted to the protection of the Blessed Virgin Mary under the title of Our Lady of Sorrows, as patroness of the congregation, with Saint Michael and Saint Joseph as co-patrons. Every Passionist religious is required to honour them, together with the founder, Paul of the Cross, and the other saints of the congregation, whose feasts they celebrate in community.

On 11 June 1741, they first affixed the emblem or "sign" of the Passion (Jesu XPI Passio) on their black tunics. The professed renewed their vows, and the new members pronounced their first vows.

== Charism ==
The Passionist charism "[seeks] the unity of our lives and our apostolate in the Passion of Jesus." The Passionists express their participation in the Passion by a special vow, by which they bind themselves to keep alive the memory of the Passion of Christ. They strive to foster awareness of its meaning and value for each person and for the life of the world. They seek to incorporate this vow into their daily lives by living the evangelical counsels of poverty, chastity and obedience.

== Apostolate ==
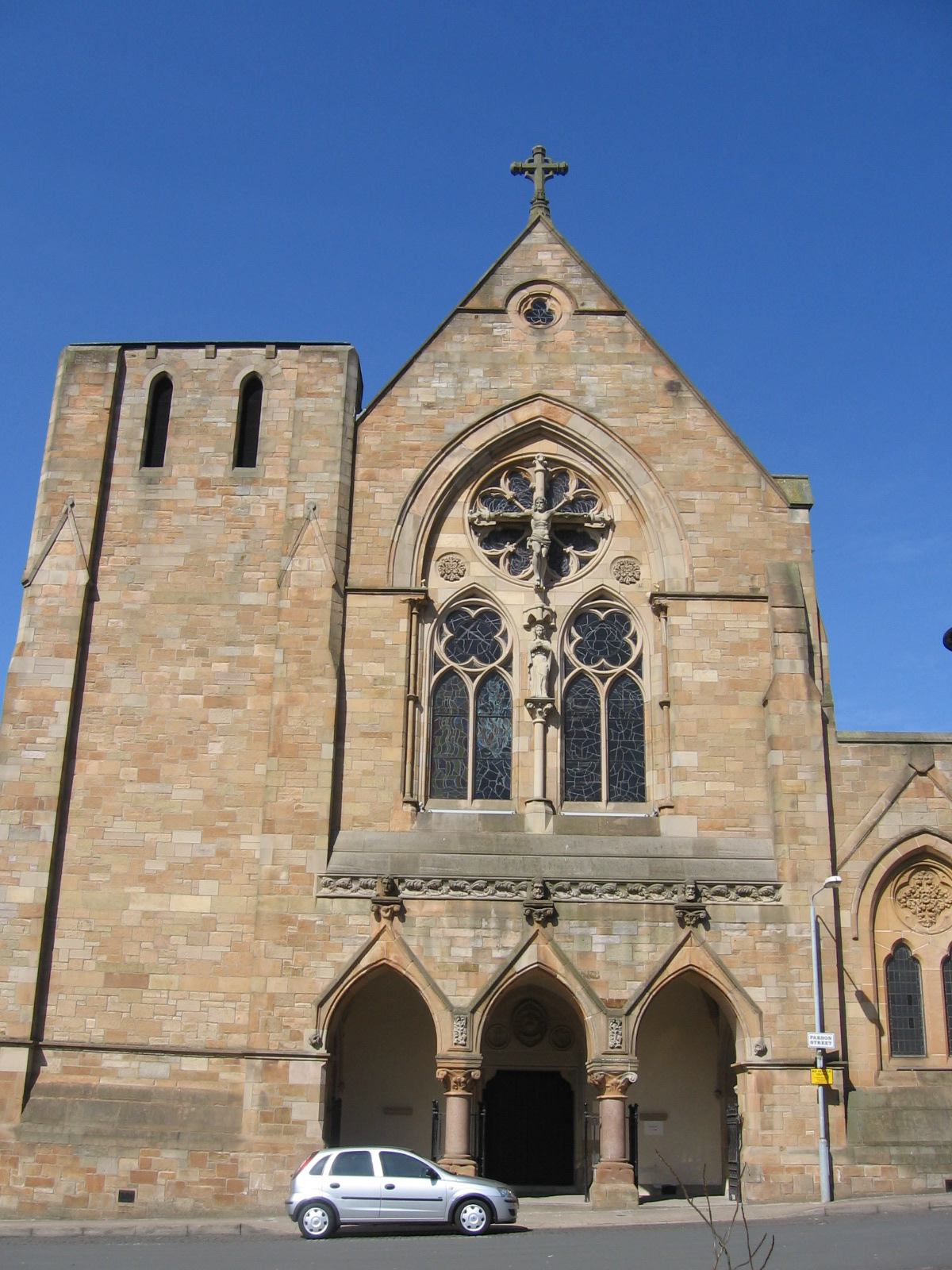
The Roman Catholic Church of St Mungo's Church, Townhead, Glasgow, is run by the Passionists of the Province of St Patrick.

Traditionally, their main apostolate has been preaching missions and retreats. According to Paul of the Cross, they were founded in order to "teach people how to pray", which they do through activities such as retreats and missions, spiritual direction, and prayer groups. Today they often also assist local churches in pastoral works, including saying masses, hearing confessions, and visiting the sick. Due to the continuing shortage of priests throughout the world, the Passionists today are sometimes designated as parish priests and curates of various parishes. The Passionists hold many retreat and conference centers around the world.

Unlike the La Sallians or the Gabrielites, Passionists do not usually open schools and universities, except seminaries for their own students wishing to become brothers and priests. There are some schools sponsored and run by the Passionists, like the St. Gemma Galgani School, (which includes primary, junior high and high school-level education) in Santiago (Chile), but these are more the exception than the rule. The Passionists are involved in social welfare projects and education mainly in the various mission territories assigned to them.

Though Passionists are not required to work in non-Christian areas as missionaries, their Rule allows its members to be posted to missionary work, such as in mainland China (first in Yuanling and then in Chongqing, before the Communists took over in 1949), India, and Japan, and in many other nations in Africa, Asia, Latin America and elsewhere as dictated by the pope or at the invitation of a local Bishop.

As of 2014 there were 2,179 Passionists in 61 countries on the five continents, led by a superior general who is elected every six years. He is assisted by six consultors in governing the congregation. The congregation is divided into provinces, vice-provinces and missions. The Congregation is also divided into groups of provinces, vice-provinces and missions called configurations. The presidents of the six configurations constitute the Extended General Council which meets with the Superior General and his consultors annually.

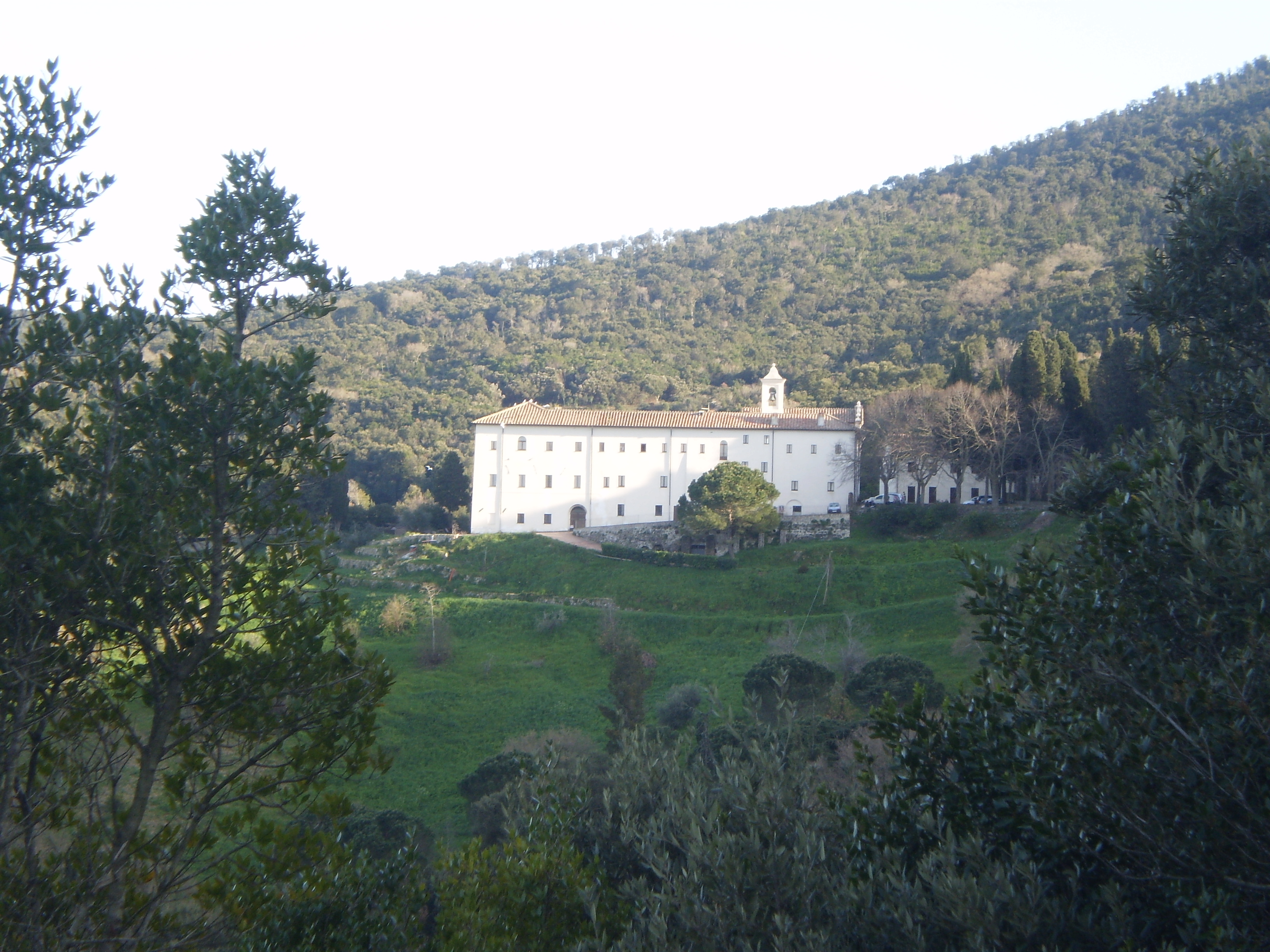
Monastery of the Presentation in Monte Argentario, Tuscany

There are six configurations in the world:

- MAPRES: The Configuration of Mary Presented In The Temple which includes Italy, France and Portugal and related mission territories.
- CCH: The Configuration of Charles Houben which includes Ireland, England, Scotland, Wales, Germany, Poland, Belgium, the Czech Republic, Ukraine, Holland, Sweden and related mission territories;
- CJC: The Configuration of Jesus Crucified which includes Mexico, Brazil, the United States, Argentina, Puerto Rico, the Dominican Republic, Haiti, Canada, Uruguay, Paraguay and related mission territories
- PASPAC: The Configuration of the Passionists in Asia Pacific which includes Australia, New Zealand, Papua New Guinea, the Philippines, Korea, Japan, Indonesia, India, China and Vietnam and related mission territories;
- CPA: The Configuration of the Passionists of Africa, which includes Kenya, Tanzania, the Republic of the Congo, South Africa, Botswana, Zambia and related mission territories;
- SCOR: The Configuration of the Sacred Heart which includes Spain, Peru, Colombia, Ecuador, Venezuela, Chile, Panama, Honduras, Guatemala, Cuba, El Salvador, Bolivia, Nicaragua and related mission territories.

The official name of the institute is "The Congregation of the Passion of Jesus Christ". The superior general resides in Rome (Piazza Ss. Giovanni e Paolo, 13, 00184 Roma; tel. 06 772711). The founder is buried in a chapel attached to the Basilica of Saints John and Paul, and the General Headquarters also hosts an international house of studies for Passionists from around the world.

== Characteristics of the Congregation ==
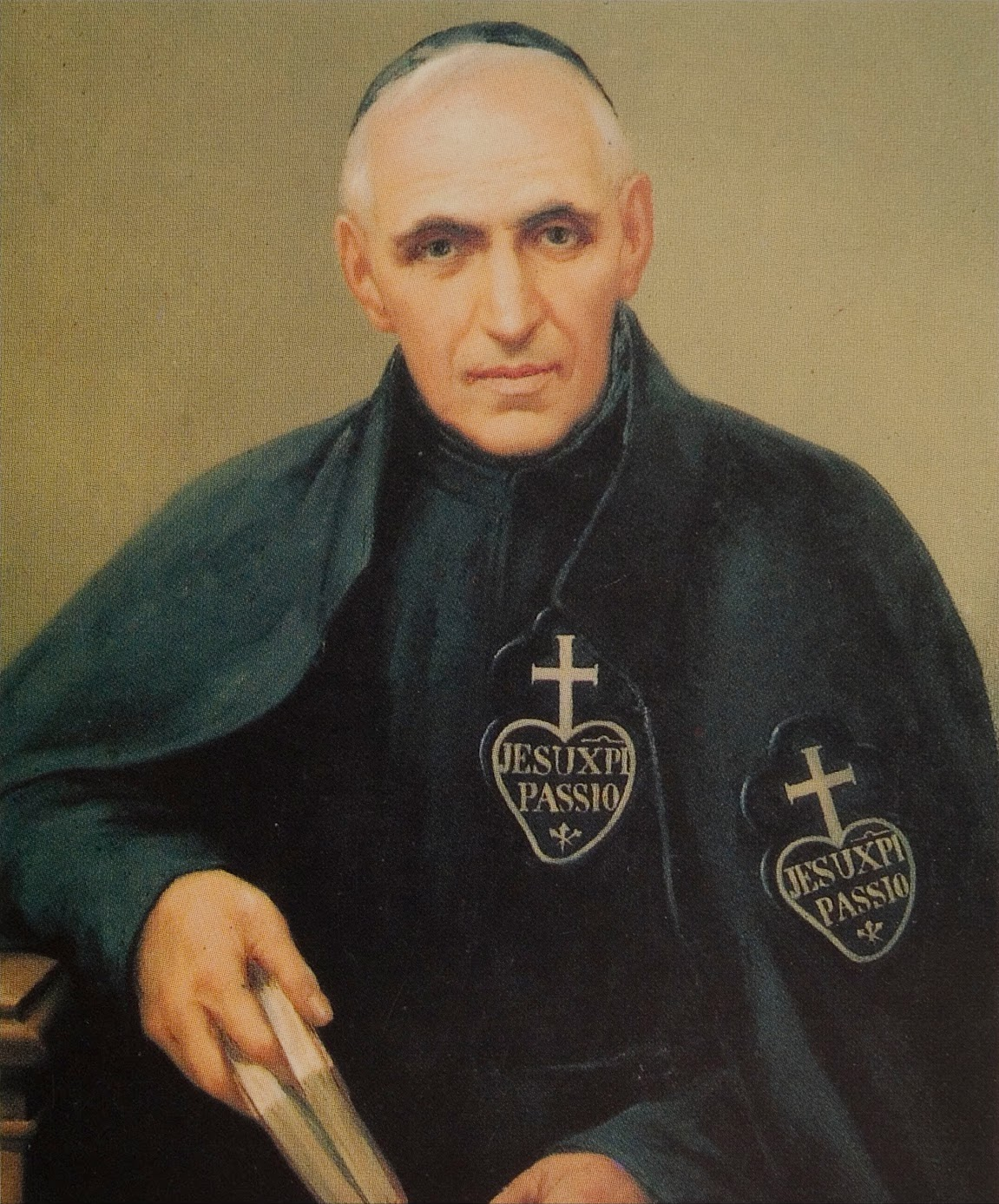
Painting of Bl. Bernard Silvestrelli wearing the Habit, Sign and Mantle

Passionist Monasteries are correctly referred to as "Retreats". The members of the congregation are not allowed to possess land, and the congregation collectively can only own the community house and a bit of land attached to it. They rely completely on their own labor and on contributions from the faithful to maintain themselves financially. The habit worn by members is a black rough woolen tunic and mantle bearing the words "Jesu XPI Passio", meaning "Passion of Jesus Christ", and the congregation was historically discalced, wearing sandals rather than shoes.

With regard to Popular Piety, the Congregation is also known for promoting devotion to the Passion among the faithful through the use of "Black Scapular of the Passion" usually worn by aspirants to the Passionist way of life. Different devotional practices such as Devotion to the Five Wounds of Christ, The Seven Sorrows of The Blessed Virgin Mary, Stations of the Cross and various forms of the Office in honour of the Passion are still widely promoted among its members.

=== Confraternity of the Passion ===
The "Black Scapular of the Passion" is a Roman Catholic devotional scapular associated with the Passionists. The tradition of the Passionists holds that in 1720 before Paul of the Cross founded the Congregation of the Passionists he had a Marian apparition during which was revealed the black habit of the order with the badge on the chest. Pope Pius IX approved of this Scapular by a Brief dated June 24, 1864. Thereafter, the Passionist Fathers established the "Confraternity of the Passion of Jesus Christ", and gave the faithful who wished to associate themselves more closely with their order a black scapular in honor of the Passion of Christ. No special practice besides wearing the Scapular and leading a good Christian life is obligatory in order to participate in the privileges of the confraternity.

The small scapular has a replica of the badge of the Passionists. It is made of black cloth, having on the front the figure of a Heart surmounted by a White Cross and bears the words "Jesu XPI Passio sit semper in cordibus nostris" (May the passion of Jesus Christ always be in our hearts). The other portion of the scapular hanging at the back, may consist simply of a small segment of black cloth, but at times has an image of the Crucifixion of Christ. Various other indulgences for the faithful who wear this scapular were approved by the Congregation for Indulgences in 1877. The Superior-General of the Passionists communicates to other priests the faculty to bless and invest with the scapular.

== Passionist Sisters ==
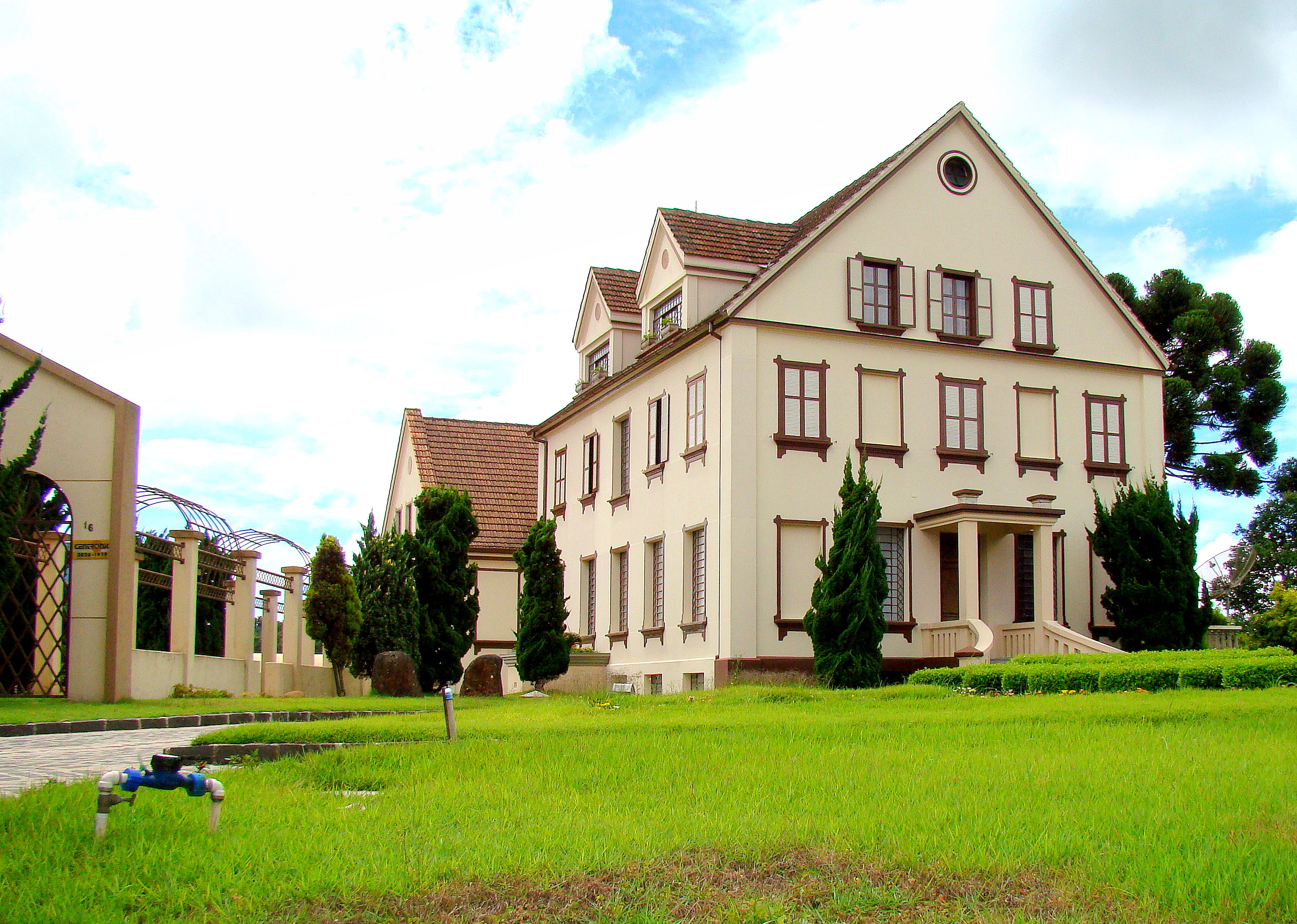
House of the Passionist Sisters in Colombo (Greater Curitiba), Paraná, Southern Brazil

The Passionist Sisters (the Sisters of the Cross and Passion) is an institute founded in 1852 by Father Gaudentius Rossi, an early Passionist priest, in collaboration with Elizabeth Prout. In its beginnings, it was called "Sisters of the Holy Family", and was later included under the Passionist family.

Due to their separate raisings guided by members of the congregation, Maria Goretti and Gemma Galgani are traditionally counted in the ranks of the Passionist Sisters, even though they died before they could formally enter the institute (Maria was murdered, Gemma died of tuberculosis).

== Saints and Blesseds of the Congregation ==
Saints

- Paolo della Croce (Paolo Francesco Danei), (3 January 1694 – 18 October 1775), founder of the Congregation, canonized on 29 June 1867
- Vincenzo Maria di San Paolo (Vincenzo Strambi) (1 January 1745 – 1 January 1824), Bishop of Macerata-Tolentino, canonized on 11 June 1950
- Gabriele dell'Addolorata (Francesco Possenti), (1 March 1838 – 27 February 1862), clerical student, canonized on 13 May 1920
- Charles of Mount Argus (Joannes Andreas Houben) (11 December 1821 – 5 January 1893), a Dutchman who ministered and died in Ireland, canonized on 3 June 2007
- Maria Goretti (16 October 1890 – 6 July 1902), instructed by the Passionists in preparation for First Holy Communion, who were also Postulators of her cause for sainthood, canonized on 24 June 1950
- Gemma da Lucca (Gemma Umberta Maria Galgani) (12 March 1878 – 11 April 1903), lay aspirant and "daughter of the Passion", canonized on 2 May 1940
- Innocencio de la Inmaculada Concepcion (Manuel Canoura Arnau) (10 March 1887 – 9 October 1934), priest martyred during the Spanish Civil War, canonized on 21 November 1999

Blesseds

- Domenico Giovanni Barberi (22 June 1792 – 27 August 1849), who brought the Passionists to Belgium, England and Ireland. Also known for having received John Henry Newman into the Catholic Church at Littlemore in Oxford, beatified on 27 October 1963
- Lorenzo Maria di San Francesco Saverio (Lorenzo Salvi) (30 October 1782 – 12 June 1856), missionary, beatified on 1 October 1989
- Pio di San Luigi (Luigi Campidelli) (29 April 1868 – 2 November 1889), student and professed cleric, beatified on 17 November 1985
- Grimoaldo della Purificazione (Ferdinando Santamaria) (4 May 1883 – 18 November 1902), student and professed religious, beatified on 29 January 1995
- Bernardo Maria di Gesu (Cesare Silvestrelli) (7 November 1831 – 9 December 1911), Superior General and Novitiate classmate of Saint Gabriele dell'Addolorata, beatified on 16 October 1988
- Isidore of Saint Joseph (Isidore de Loor) (18 April 1881 – 6 October 1916), Belgian lay brother, beatified on 30 September 1984
- Nicéforo de Jesus y Maria (Vincente Díez Tejerina) and 25 Companions (died 24 July 1936), Martyrs of the Spanish Civil War from Daimiel, beatified on 1 October 1989
- Eugene (Vincent) Bossilkov (16 November 1900 – 11 November 1952), Bishop of Nicopolis martyred during the communist regime in Bulgaria, and one of the first Bulgarians to be declared Blessed, beatified on 15 March 1998

Venerables

- Giovanni Battista di San Michele Arcangele (Giovanni Battista Danei) (4 April 1695 - 30 August 1765), cofounded the Congregation alongside his older brother St. Paolo della Croce, declared Venerable on 7 August 1940
- Maria Crocifissa di Gesu (Faustina Gertrude Constantini) (18 August 1713 - 16 November 1787), foundress of the Passionist Nuns alongside St. Paolo della Croce, declared Venerable on 17 December 1982
- Maria Maddalena Frescobaldi Capponi (11 November 1771 - 8 April 1839), foundress of the Passionist Sisters of Saint Paul of the Cross, declared Venerable on 14 March 2024
- Mary Joseph of Jesus (Elizabeth Prout), (2 September 1820 – 11 January 1864), English foundress of the Sisters of the Cross and Passion, declared Venerable on 22 January 2021
- Ignatius of St Paul (George Spencer) (21 December 1799 – 1 October 1864), English convert from Anglicanism and professed priest, declared Venerable on 20 February 2021
- Gabriele di Nostra Signora del Sacro Cuore (Galileo Nicolini) (17 June 1882 - 13 May 1897), novice, declared Venerable on 27 November 1981
- Giovanni dell'Espirito Santo (Giacomo Bruni) (8 August 1882 - 12 December 1905), professed priest, declared Venerable on 9 June 1983
- Germano di Sant'Estanislao (Vincenzo Ruoppolo) (17 January 1850 - 11 December 1909), professed priest, declared Venerable on 11 July 1995
- Norberto of Our Lady of the Garden (Dominico Cassinelli) (12 April 1829 - 29 June 1911), professed priest, declared Venerable on 15 December 1994
- Giuseppe di Gesu e Maria (Vincenzo Francesco Pesci) (13 September 1853 - 12 January 1929), professed priest, declared Venerable on 6 July 1993
- Nazareno della Maria Immacolata (Nazareno Santolini) (23 October 1859 - 4 January 1930), professed priest, declared Venerable on 7 September 1989
- Bernard of the Mother of Beautiful Love (Zygmunt Kryszkiewicz) (2 May 1915 - 7 July 1945), Polish priest, declared Venerable on 22 May 2021
- Maria Addolorata of the Sacred Side (Maria Luciani) (2 May 1920 - 23 July 1954), professed religious from the Passionist Nuns, declared Venerable on 7 November 2018
- Maria Maddalena di Gesu della Santissimo Sacramento (Giuseppina Marcucci) (24 April 1888 - 10 February 1960), professed religious from the Passionist Nuns, declared Venerable on 3 April 2014
- Gerardo de San Francisco (Francisco Sagarduy de Lasgoita) (15 February 1881 - 29 May 1962), Spanish professed religious, declared Venerable on 21 December 1991
- Antonieta di San Michele Arcangele (Maria Conchita Farani) (29 June 1906 - 7 May 1963), Brazilian professed religious from the Passionist Sisters of Saint Paul of the Cross, declared Venerable on 13 June 1992
- Generoso della S.S. Crocifisso (Angelo Fontanarosa) (6 November 1881 - 9 January 1966), professed priest, declared Venerable on 27 March 2013
- Martin of the Side of Jesus (Fulgencio Elorza Legaristi) (30 December 1899 - 30 December 1966), bishop of the territorial prelature of Moyobamba, declared Venerable on 9 April 2022
- Francisco de la Pasion (Victoriano Gondra Muruaga) (5 March 1910 - 6 August 1974), Spanish professed priest, declared Venerable on 15 March 2008

Servants of God

- Eugenio di San Gabriele Arcangele (Raffaele Faggiano) (28 January 1877 - 2 May 1960), Bishop of Cariati, declared as a Servant of God on 9 June 1987
- Marie-Marthe of Jesus Crucified (Maria Martha Vandenputte) (29 September 1891 - 17 September 1967), Belgian foundress of the Missionary Sisters of the Cross and the Passion (now part of Passionist Sisters of Saint Paul of the Cross), declared as a Servant of God in 2013
- Theodore of Mary Inmaculate (Daniel Bible Foley) (3 March 1913 – 9 October 1974), American professed priest and the superior general of the Congregation, declared as a Servant of God on 19 December 2007
- Benito de San Pablo de la Cruz (Severiano Arrieta Gorrochategui) (8 November 1907 - 29 August 1975), professed priest, declared as a Servant of God on 3 November 1998
- Estanislao dell'Espirito Santo (Amilcare Battistelli) (28 September 1885 - 20 February 1981), bishop of Teramo-Atri, declared as a Servant of God on 1 June 1988
- Carmelina della Croce (Carmelina Tarentino) (7 February 1937 - 21 March 1992), professed religious from the Passionist Sisters of Saint Paul of the Cross, declared as a Servant of God on 1 September 2008
- Candido dell'Immacolata (Erraldo Ulisse Amantini) (31 January 1914 - 22 September 1992), professed priest, declared as a Servant of God on 5 January 2012
- Pedro (Juan) Enoch Richards (31 December 1911 - 30 October 2004), Argentinian priest

== Other notable members ==
- John Moynihan Tettemer (Father Ildefonso), appointed consultor general of the order in 1914
- Kieran Creagh, an Irish Passionist priest who was shot in South Africa
- Martin J. Newell, an English Passionist priest, anti-war protester and climate activist
- Brian D'Arcy, an Irish Passionist priest, writer, newspaper columnist, broadcaster, and preacher.
- Edward L. Beck, an American Passionist priest and CNN commentator.
- Thomas Berry, cultural historian, teacher, Fordham University, and author of Dream of the Earth, The Great Work, and The Universe Story.

== See also ==
- Chaplet of the Five Wounds
- St. Paul of the Cross Catholic Church - Church in Atlanta that was established by the order
