= Isola del Gran Sasso d'Italia =

- Comune
- Comune di Isola del Gran Sasso d'Italia
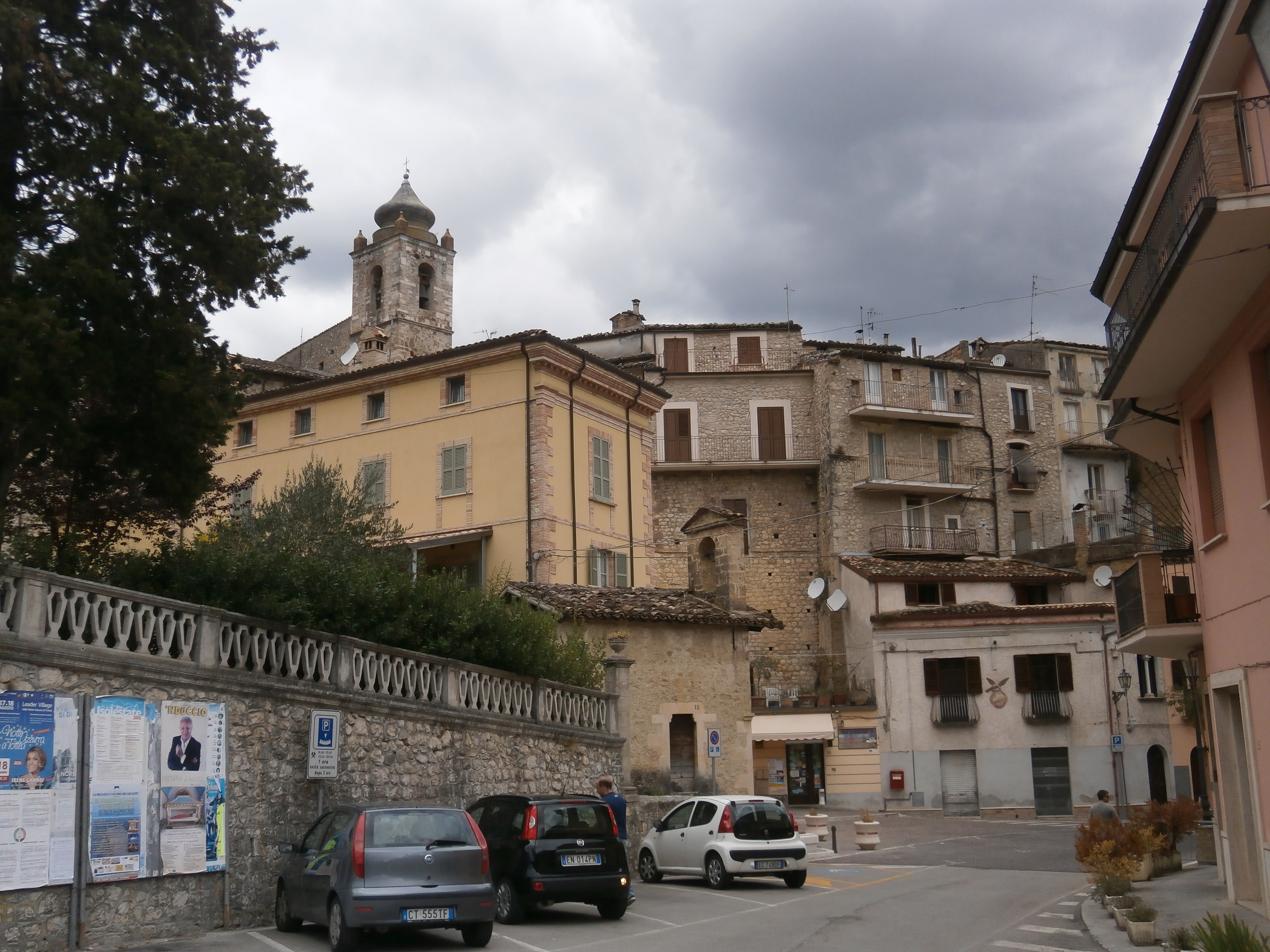

- Location within Italy Location within Abruzzo
- Coordinates: 42°30′N 13°40′E
- Country: Italy
- Region: Abruzzo
- Province: Teramo (TE)
- Frazioni: Capsano, Casale San Nicola, Cerchiara, Ceriseto, Cesa di Francia, Colliberti, Fano a Corno, Forca di Valle, Pretara, San Gabriele dell'Addolorata, San Massimo, San Pietro, Trignano, Varano

Government
  - Mayor: Andrea Ianni

Area
  - Total: 83 km^{2} (32 sq mi)
- Elevation: 498 m (1,634 ft)

Population (30 November 2014)
  - Total: 4,789
  - Density: 58/km^{2} (150/sq mi)
- Demonym: Isolani
- Time zone: UTC+1 (CET)
  - Summer (DST): UTC+2 (CEST)
- Postal code: 64045
- Dialing code: 0861
- Patron saint: Saint Massimo
- Saint day: First Sunday in May
- Website: Official website

Isola del Gran Sasso d'Italia is a town and comune in province of Teramo in the Abruzzo region of southern Italy. It is located in the Gran Sasso e Monti della Laga National Park. The Gran Sasso mountain is the highest mountain in the Apennine chain in Italy.

== Climate ==
Climate data for Isola del Gran Sasso d'Italia, elevation 553 m (1,814 ft), (1951–2000)
Month	Jan	Feb	Mar	Apr	May	Jun	Jul	Aug	Sep	Oct	Nov	Dec	Year
Record high °C (°F)	24.0 (75.2)	24.7 (76.5)	25.1 (77.2)	28.0 (82.4)	33.9 (93.0)	39.8 (103.6)	39.8 (103.6)	39.6 (103.3)	36.3 (97.3)	29.5 (85.1)	25.0 (77.0)	20.0 (68.0)	39.8 (103.6)
Mean daily maximum °C (°F)	8.1 (46.6)	9.4 (48.9)	12.1 (53.8)	15.7 (60.3)	20.5 (68.9)	24.7 (76.5)	28.2 (82.8)	27.9 (82.2)	23.6 (74.5)	17.7 (63.9)	12.4 (54.3)	8.7 (47.7)	17.4 (63.4)
Daily mean °C (°F)	4.4 (39.9)	5.3 (41.5)	7.6 (45.7)	10.8 (51.4)	15.2 (59.4)	19.0 (66.2)	22.0 (71.6)	21.7 (71.1)	18.2 (64.8)	13.3 (55.9)	8.6 (47.5)	5.2 (41.4)	12.6 (54.7)
Mean daily minimum °C (°F)	0.6 (33.1)	1.1 (34.0)	3.1 (37.6)	5.9 (42.6)	9.9 (49.8)	13.4 (56.1)	15.8 (60.4)	15.5 (59.9)	12.8 (55.0)	8.8 (47.8)	4.8 (40.6)	1.7 (35.1)	7.8 (46.0)
Record low °C (°F)	−12.0 (10.4)	−12.2 (10.0)	−10.0 (14.0)	−4.4 (24.1)	−0.9 (30.4)	4.7 (40.5)	6.4 (43.5)	5.4 (41.7)	2.9 (37.2)	−1.5 (29.3)	−7.2 (19.0)	−8.8 (16.2)	−12.2 (10.0)
Average precipitation mm (inches)	104.2 (4.10)	95.1 (3.74)	110.9 (4.37)	131.2 (5.17)	98.9 (3.89)	82.7 (3.26)	66.2 (2.61)	73.4 (2.89)	95.1 (3.74)	135.3 (5.33)	159.3 (6.27)	138.5 (5.45)	1,290.8 (50.82)
Average precipitation days	9	9	11	11	11	9	7	7	8	10	11	12	115
Source: Regione Abruzzo
