= List of post-Reformation Catholic saints in the United Kingdom =

Roman Catholic saints in the United Kingdom

The Catholic Church recognises certain deceased Catholics as saints, beati, venerabili, and servants of God. In the post-Reformation period, some such people have been born, died, or lived in the United Kingdom.

== Saints ==
Image	Name	Born	Died	Church Status	Diocese	Type of Cause
	John Henry Newman	21 February 1801; London, England	11 August 1890; Edgbaston, Birmingham, England	Priest of the Oratorians (Birmingham Congregation); Cardinal	Birmingham	Heroic Virtues
	John Henry Newman	21 February 1801; London, England	11 August 1890; Edgbaston, Birmingham, England	Opening of Cause: 17 June 1958; Declared "Venerable": 22 January 1991; Beatified: 19 September 2010 by Pope Benedict XVI; Canonized: 13 October 2019 by Pope Francis		
	Carlo Acutis	3 May 1991; London, England	12 October 2006; Monza, Monza e Brianza, Italy	Child	Milan	Heroic Virtues
	Carlo Acutis	3 May 1991; London, England	12 October 2006; Monza, Monza e Brianza, Italy	Opening of Cause: 13 May 2013; Declared "Venerable": 5 July 2018; Beatified: 10 October 2020 by Cardial Agostino Vallini; Canonized: 7 September 2025 by Pope Leo XIV		

== Blesseds ==
Image	Name	Born	Died	Church Status	Diocese	Type of Cause
	Domenico Barberi (rel. name: Dominic of the Mother of God)	22 June 1792; Viterbo, Italy	27 August 1849; Reading, Berkshire, England	Professed Priest, Congregation of the Passion of Jesus Christ (Passionists)	Rome and Westminster	Heroic Virtues
	Domenico Barberi (rel. name: Dominic of the Mother of God)	22 June 1792; Viterbo, Italy	27 August 1849; Reading, Berkshire, England	Opening of Cause: 12 April 1905; Declared "Venerable": 16 May 1937; Beatified: 27 October 1963 by Pope Paul VI		
	Michael Iwene Tansi (rel. name: Cyprian)	September 1903; Igboezum, Aguleri, Anambra, Nigeria	20 January 1964; Coalville, Leicestershire, England	Professed Priest, Cistercians of the Strict Observance (Trappists)	Onitsha and Nottingham	Heroic Virtues
	Michael Iwene Tansi (rel. name: Cyprian)	September 1903; Igboezum, Aguleri, Anambra, Nigeria	20 January 1964; Coalville, Leicestershire, England	Opening of Cause: 3 February 1986; Declared "Venerable": 11 July 1995; Beatified: 28 March 1998 by Pope John Paul II		

== Venerables ==
Image	Name	Born	Died	Church Status	Diocese	Type of Cause
	Margaret Sinclair (rel. name: Mary Francis of the Five Wounds)	29 March 1900; Edinburgh, Scotland	24 November 1925; Warley, Essex, England	Professed Religious, Colettine Poor Clare Nuns	Brentwood and Saint Andrews-Edinburgh	Heroic Virtues
	Margaret Sinclair (rel. name: Mary Francis of the Five Wounds)	29 March 1900; Edinburgh, Scotland	24 November 1925; Warley, Essex, England	Opening of Cause: August 1931; Declared "Venerable": 6 February 1978		
	Mary Potter	22 November 1847; London, England	9 April 1913; Rome, Italy	Founder, Little Company of Mary	Rome	Heroic Virtues
	Mary Potter	22 November 1847; London, England	9 April 1913; Rome, Italy	Opening of Cause: 1942; Declared "Venerable": 8 February 1988		
	Cornelia Peacock Connelly	15 January 1809; Philadelphia, Pennsylvania, United States	18 April 1879; Saint Leonards-on-Sea, Hastings, Sussex, England	Founder, Society of the Holy Child Jesus	Southwark	Heroic Virtues
	Cornelia Peacock Connelly	15 January 1809; Philadelphia, Pennsylvania, United States	18 April 1879; Saint Leonards-on-Sea, Hastings, Sussex, England	Opening of Cause: 12 November 1959; 13 June 1992		
	Joan Ward (rel. name: Mary)	23 January 1586; Mulwith, North Yorkshire, England	30 January 1645; Heworth, North Yorkshire, England	Founder, Institute of the Blessed Virgin Mary (Sisters of Loreto) and the Congregation of Jesus	Middlesbrough and Munich–Freising	Heroic Virtues
	Joan Ward (rel. name: Mary)	23 January 1586; Mulwith, North Yorkshire, England	30 January 1645; Heworth, North Yorkshire, England	Opening of Cause: 11 October 1929; Declared "Venerable": 19 December 2009		
	Bridget Teresa McCrory (rel. name: Mary Angeline Teresa)	21 January 1893; Brockagh, County Tyrone, Northern Ireland	21 January 1984; Germantown, New York, United States	Founder, Carmelite Sisters for the Aged and Infirm	Albany	Heroic Virtues
	Bridget Teresa McCrory (rel. name: Mary Angeline Teresa)	21 January 1893; Brockagh, County Tyrone, Northern Ireland	21 January 1984; Germantown, New York, United States	Opening of Cause: 1 June 1989; Declared "Venerable": 28 June 2012		
	Mary Jane Wilson (rel. name: Maria of Saint Francis)	3 October 1840; Harihar, Davanagere, Karnataka, India	18 October 1916; Funchal, Madeira, Portugal	Founder, Franciscan Sisters of Our Lady of Victories	Funchal	Heroic Virtues
	Mary Jane Wilson (rel. name: Maria of Saint Francis)	3 October 1840; Harihar, Davanagere, Karnataka, India	18 October 1916; Funchal, Madeira, Portugal	Opening of Cause: 7 November 1987; Declared "Venerable": 9 October 2013		
	Frances Margaret Taylor (rel. name: Mary Magdalen of the Sacred Heart)	20 January 1832; Stoke Rochford, Lincolnshire, England	9 June 1900; London, England	Founder, Poor Servants of the Mother of God	Westminster	Heroic Virtues
	Frances Margaret Taylor (rel. name: Mary Magdalen of the Sacred Heart)	20 January 1832; Stoke Rochford, Lincolnshire, England	9 June 1900; London, England	Opening of Cause: 2 June 1995; Declared "Venerable": 12 June 2014		
	Sophia Leeves (rel. name: Marie–Veronique of the Passion)	1 October 1823; Istanbul, Türkiye	16 November 1906; Pau, Pyrénées-Atlantiques, France	Professed Religious, Discalced Carmelite Nuns; Founder, Sisters of the Apostolic Carmel	Bengaluru and Bayonne	Heroic Virtues
	Sophia Leeves (rel. name: Marie–Veronique of the Passion)	1 October 1823; Istanbul, Türkiye	16 November 1906; Pau, Pyrénées-Atlantiques, France	Opening of Cause: 16 May 1997; Declared "Venerable": 8 July 2014		
	Elizabeth Prout (rel. name: Mary Joseph of Jesus)	2 September 1820; Coleham, Shrewsbury, Shropshire, England	11 January 1864; St Helens, Merseyside, England	Founder, Sisters of the Cross and Passion	Liverpool	Heroic Virtues
	Elizabeth Prout (rel. name: Mary Joseph of Jesus)	Opening of Cause: 4 February 1994; Declared "Venerable": 21 January 2021				
	George Spencer (rel. name: Ignatius of Saint Paul)	21 December 1799; London, England	1 October 1864; Carstairs, South Lanarkshire, Scotland	Professed Priest, Congregation of the Passion of Jesus Christ (Passionists)	Liverpool and Motherwell	Heroic Virtues
	George Spencer (rel. name: Ignatius of Saint Paul)	21 December 1799; London, England	1 October 1864; Carstairs, South Lanarkshire, Scotland	Opening of Cause: 18 February 1992; Declared "Venerable": 20 February 2021		
	Florence Kate Flanagan (rel. name: Maria Caterina)	17 July 1892; London, England	19 March 1941; Stockholm, Sweden	Professed Religious, Bridgettine Sisters	Diocese of Rome and Stockholm	Heroic Virtues
	Florence Kate Flanagan (rel. name: Maria Caterina)	17 July 1892; London, England	19 March 1941; Stockholm, Sweden	Opening of Cause: 15 December 2008; Declared "Venerable": 23 March 2023		
	Madaleina Catherine Beauchamp Hambrough (rel. name: Maria Riccarda)	10 September 1887; London, England	26 June 1966; Rome, Italy	Professed Religious, Bridgettine Sisters	Rome	Heroic Virtues
	Madaleina Catherine Beauchamp Hambrough (rel. name: Maria Riccarda)	10 September 1887; London, England	26 June 1966; Rome, Italy	Opening of Cause: 16 December 2009; Declared "Venerable": 27 January 2025		

== Servants of God ==
Image	Name	Born	Died	Church Status	Diocese	Type of Cause
	James II (VII) Stuart	14 October 1633; London, England	16 September 1701; Saint-Germain-en-Laye, Yvelines, France	Married Layperson; King of England, Scotland and Ireland	Westminster	Heroic Virtues
	James II (VII) Stuart	14 October 1633; London, England	16 September 1701; Saint-Germain-en-Laye, Yvelines, France	Opening of Cause: 1734		
	Henriette Le Forestier d'Osseville (rel. name: Mère Saint Mary)	19 April 1803; Rouen, Seine-Maritime, France	28 April 1858; Norwood, London, England	Founder, Congregation of Our Lady of Fidelity	Bayeux-Lisieux and Southwark	Heroic Virtues
	Henriette Le Forestier d'Osseville (rel. name: Mère Saint Mary)	19 April 1803; Rouen, Seine-Maritime, France	28 April 1858; Norwood, London, England	Opening of Cause: 29 July 2006		
	Margaret Hallahan	23 January 1802; London, England	11 May 1868; Stone, Staffordshire, England	Founder, Dominican Sisters of Saint Catherine of Siena (English Congregation)	Birmingham	Heroic Virtues
	Margaret Hallahan	23 January 1802; London, England	11 May 1868; Stone, Staffordshire, England	Opening of Cause: 20 April 1994		
	Caroline Jones Chisholm	30 May 1808; Wootton, Northamptonshire, England	25 March 1877; London, England	Married Layperson	Canberra-Goulburn	Heroic Virtues
	Caroline Jones Chisholm	30 May 1808; Wootton, Northamptonshire, England	25 March 1877; London, England	Opening of Cause: 28 December 2008		
	James Marshall	19 December 1829; Edinburgh, Scotland	9 August 1889; Margate, Thanet, Kent, England	Married Layperson	Cape Coast	Heroic Virtues
	James Marshall	19 December 1829; Edinburgh, Scotland	9 August 1889; Margate, Thanet, Kent, England	Opening of Cause: 14 May 2019		
	Adèle Euphrasie Barbier (rel. name: Marie of the Heart of Jesus)	4 January 1829; Caen, Calvados, France	18 January 1893; Sturry, Kent, England	Founder, Sisters of Our Lady of the Missions	Southwark	Heroic Virtues
	Adèle Euphrasie Barbier (rel. name: Marie of the Heart of Jesus)	4 January 1829; Caen, Calvados, France	18 January 1893; Sturry, Kent, England	Opening of Cause: 11 October 1957		
	Teresa Helena Higginson	27 May 1844; Holywell, Flintshire, Wales	15 February 1905; Chudleigh, Devon, England	Layperson	Liverpool	Heroic Virtues
	Teresa Helena Higginson	27 May 1844; Holywell, Flintshire, Wales	15 February 1905; Chudleigh, Devon, England	Opening of Cause: 26 June 1935		
	Mary Janet Erskine Stuart	11 November 1857; Cottesmore, Rutland, England	21 October 1914; Roehampton, London, England	Professed Religious, Society of the Religious of the Sacred Heart of Jesus	Southwark	Heroic Virtues
	Mary Janet Erskine Stuart	11 November 1857; Cottesmore, Rutland, England	21 October 1914; Roehampton, London, England	Opening of Cause: 25 July 1952		
	Antonio Mansi	9 March 1896; London, England	31 October 1918; Rome, England	Professed Religious, Conventual Franciscans	Rome	Heroic Virtues
	Antonio Mansi	9 March 1896; London, England	31 October 1918; Rome, England	Opening of Cause: 8 March 2019		
	Marie-Adèle Garnier (rel. name: Marie of Saint Peter)	15 August 1838; Grancey-le-Château-Neuvelle, Côte-d'Or, France	17 June 1924; London, England	Founder, Benedictine Adorers of the Sacred Heart of Jesus of Montmartre and the Benedictines of the Sacred Heart of Montmartre	Langres	Heroic Virtues
	Marie-Adèle Garnier (rel. name: Marie of Saint Peter)	15 August 1838; Grancey-le-Château-Neuvelle, Côte-d'Or, France	17 June 1924; London, England	Opening of Cause: 3 December 2016		
	Artur Schulz	11 November 1897; London, England	30 January 1945; Bisztynek, Bartoszyce, Poland	Diocesan Priest	Warmia	Martyr in odium fidei, uti fertur
	Artur Schulz	11 November 1897; London, England	30 January 1945; Bisztynek, Bartoszyce, Poland	Opening of Cause: 28 July 2007		
	Sybil Kathigasu	3 September 1899; Medan, North Sumatra, Indonesia	12 June 1948; Lanark, South Lanarkshire, Scotland	Married Layperson	Penang	Heroic Virtues
	Sybil Kathigasu	3 September 1899; Medan, North Sumatra, Indonesia	12 June 1948; Lanark, South Lanarkshire, Scotland	Opening of Cause: July 2024		
	Clara Ellerker [Perrins] (rel. name: Mary of the Blessed Sacrament)	18 October 1875; Handsworth, Staffordshire, England	11 January 1949; Port of Spain, Trinidad and Tobago	Founder, Carmelite Sisters of "Corpus Christi"	Port of Spain	Heroic Virtues
	Clara Ellerker [Perrins] (rel. name: Mary of the Blessed Sacrament)	18 October 1875; Handsworth, Staffordshire, England	11 January 1949; Port of Spain, Trinidad and Tobago	Opening of Cause: 19 August 1998		
	John Randal Bradburne	14 June 1921; Skirwith, Cumbria, England	2 September 1979; Mutoko, Mashonaland East, Zimbabwe	Layperson; Member, Secular Franciscans	Harare	Offer of Life
	John Randal Bradburne	14 June 1921; Skirwith, Cumbria, England	2 September 1979; Mutoko, Mashonaland East, Zimbabwe	Opening of Cause: 5 September 2019		
	Jeremy Joyner White	18 May 1938; Aldershot, Hampshire, England	23 April 1990; Lagos, Nigeria	Married Layperson; Member, Opus Dei Movement	Lagos	Heroic Virtues
	Jeremy Joyner White	18 May 1938; Aldershot, Hampshire, England	23 April 1990; Lagos, Nigeria	Opening of Cause: 28 April 2016		
	Geoffrey Leonard Cheshire	7 September 1917; Chester, Cheshire, England	31 July 1992; Cavendish, Suffolk, England	Married Layperson	East Anglia	Heroic Virtues
	Geoffrey Leonard Cheshire	7 September 1917; Chester, Cheshire, England	31 July 1992; Cavendish, Suffolk, England	Opening of Cause: 8 September 2017		
	Julius Kambarage Nyerere	13 April 1922; Butiama, Mara, Tanzania	14 October 1999; London, England	Married Layperson; President of Tanzania	Dar-es-Salaam and Westminster	Heroic Virtues
	Julius Kambarage Nyerere	13 April 1922; Butiama, Mara, Tanzania	14 October 1999; London, England	Opening of Cause: 13 May 2005		
	Andrew Bertie	15 May 1929; London, England	7 February 2008; Rome, Italy	Prince and Grand Master, Sovereign Military Order of Malta	Rome	Heroic Virtues
	Andrew Bertie	15 May 1929; London, England	7 February 2008; Rome, Italy	Opening of Cause: 20 February 2015		
	Clare Theresa Crockett (rel. name: Clare Maria of the Trinity and the Heart of Mary)	14 November 1982; Derry, Northern Ireland	16 April 2016; Playa Prieta, Manabí, Ecuador	Professed Religious, Servant Sisters of the Home of the Mother	Alcalá de Henares	Heroic Virtues
	Clare Theresa Crockett (rel. name: Clare Maria of the Trinity and the Heart of Mary)	14 November 1982; Derry, Northern Ireland	16 April 2016; Playa Prieta, Manabí, Ecuador	Opening of Cause: 2 March 2023		
	Ignacio Echeverría Miralles del Imperial	25 May 1978; Ferrol, A Coruña, Spain	3 June 2017; London, England	Layperson	Madrid and Westminster	Offer of Life
	Ignacio Echeverría Miralles del Imperial	25 May 1978; Ferrol, A Coruña, Spain	3 June 2017; London, England	Opening of Cause:		

== Candidates for Sainthood ==
This list includes individuals for whom there is a public petition to the bishop to commence an investigation into the heroic virtue of the individual leading to a decree declaring them to be a Servant of God.

Image	Name	Born	Died	Church Status	Diocese	Type of Cause
	Luisa Carvajal Mendoza	2 January 1566; Jaraicejo, Cáceres, Spain	2 January 1614; London, England	Layperson	Westminster	Heroic Virtues
	Eleanor Vaux Brooksby	c. 1560; North Northamptonshire, England	1625; Leicestershire, England	Married Layperson	Nottingham	Heroic Virtues
	Anne Vaux	c. 1562; Great Harrowden, North Northamptonshire, England	c. 1637; Leicestershire, England	Layperson	Nottingham	Heroic Virtues
	Andrew White	c. 1579; London, England, United Kingdom	27 December 1656; London, England, United Kingdom	Professed Priest, Jesuits	Baltimore	Heroic Virtues
	Margaret Mostyn (rel. name: Margaret of Jesus)	8 December 1625; Talacre, Flintshire, Wales	29 August 1679; Lier, Antwerp, Belgium	Professed Religious, Discalced Carmelite Nuns	Antwerp	Heroic Virtues
	Alexander Cameron	17 September 1701; Achnacarry, Lochaber, Scotland	19 October 1746; Gravesend, Kent, England	Professed Priest, Jesuits	Glasgow	Heroic Virtues
	Frances Dickinson (rel. name: Clare Joseph of the Heart of Jesus)	12 July 1755; London, England	27 March 1830; Port Tobacco, Maryland, United States	Professed Religious, Discalced Carmelite Nuns	Washington	Heroic Virtues
	Augustus Welby Pugin	1 March 18112; Bloomsbury, London, England	14 September 1852; Ramsgate, Kent, England	Married Layperson	Southwark	Heroic Virtues
	John Talbot, 16th Earl of Shrewsbury	18 March 1791; Dodford with Grafton, Worcestershire, England	9 November 1852; Naples, Italy	Married Layperson	Shrewsbury	Heroic Virtues
	Louisa Elizabeth Rolls Vaughan	8 October 1810; London, England	24 January 1853; Welsh Bicknor, Herefordshire, England	Married Layperson	Cardiff	Heroic Virtues
	Cecil Chetwynd-Talbot	17 April 1808; Great Haywood, Staffordshire, England	13 May 1877; Rome, Italy	Married Layperson	Birmingham and Rome	Heroic Virtues
	John Bede Polding	18 November 1794; Liverpool, England	16 March 1877; Sydney, New South Wales, Australia	Professed Priest, Benedictines (English Congregation); Archbishop of Sydney; Founder, Sisters of the Good Samaritan	Sydney	Heroic Virtues
	Alice Mary Thorpe (rel. name: Catherine Mary Antoninus)	1844; London, England	2 March 1879; Sparkill, New York, United States	Founder, Dominican Sisters of Our Lady of the Rosary (now the Dominican Sisters of Sparkill)	New York	Heroic Virtues
	Georgiana Fullerton née Leveson-Gower	23 September 1812; Tixall, Staffordshire, England	19 January 1885; Bournemouth, Dorset, England	Married Layperson; Member, Secular Franciscans	Westminster	Heroic Virtues
	Margaret Radclyffe Livingstone Eyre	16 June 1800; Maybole, South Ayrshire, Scotland	3 September 1889; London, England	Married Layperson	Westminster	Heroic Virtues
	Julian Tenison-Woods	15 November 1832; London, England	7 October 1889; Sydney, New South Wales, Australia	Diocesan Priest; Cofounder, Sisters of Saint Joseph of the Sacred Heart	Sydney	Heroic Virtues
	Alice Ingham (rel. name: Mary Francis)	8 March 1830; Rochdale, Greater Manchester, England	24 August 1890; Blackburn, Lancashire, England	Founder, Franciscan Missionaries of Saint Joseph	Lancaster	Heroic Virtues
	Sophia Charlotte Adams (rel. name: Mary Rose Columba)	21 March 1832; Woodchester, Gloucestershire, England	30 December 1891; Adelaide, South Australia, Australia	Professed Religious, Dominican Sisters of Saint Catherine of Siena (English Congregation)	Adelaide	Heroic Virtues
	Honoria Conway (rel. name: Mary Vincent)	18 June 1815; Dover, Kent, England	27 May 1892; Saint John, New Brunswick, Canada	Founder, Sisters of Charity of Saint John (now the Sisters of Charity of the Immaculate Conception)	Saint John	Heroic Virtues
	Henry Edward Manning	15 July 1808; Totteridge, Greater London, England	14 January 1892; London, England	Archbishop of Westminster; Cardinal; Member, Secular Franciscans	Westminster	Heroic Virtues
	Augusta Theodosia Drane (rel. name: Frances Raphael)	28 December 1823; Bromley-by-Bow, Greater London, England	29 April 1894; Stone, Staffordshire, England	Professed Religious, Dominican Sisters of Saint Catherine of Siena (English Congregation)	Birmingham	Heroic Virtues
	Elizabeth Hayes (rel. name: Mary Ignatius of Jesus)	1823; Saint Peter Port, Guernsey	6 May 1894; Rome, Italy	Founder, Franciscan Missionary Sisters of the Immaculate Conception	Saint Paul and Minneapolis	Heroic Virtues
	Charlotte Montagu Douglas Scott	10 April 1811; Longleat, Wiltshire, England	18 March 1895; Ditton, Berkshire, England	Married Layperson of the Archdiocese of St Andrews and Edinburgh	Saint Andrews-Edinburgh	Heroic Virtues
	Catherine Rosamund Fitzgibbon (rel. name: Mary Irene)	12 May 1824; London, England	14 August 1896; New York City, New York, United States	Professed Religious, Sisters of Charity of New York	New York	Heroic Virtues
	Duncan McNab	11 May 1820; Achrinich, Argyllshire, Scotland	19 September 1896; Richmond, Victoria, Australia	Diocesan Priest	Melbourne	Heroic Virtues
	Charles Gordon O'Neill	23 March 1828; Glasgow, Scotland	8 November 1900; Sydney, New South Wales, Australia	Married Layperson; Cofounder, Society of Saint Vincent de Paul	Sydney	Heroic Virtues
	Herbert Vaughan	15 April 1832; Gloucester, England	19 June 1903; Mill Hill, Greater London, England	Archbishop of Westminster; Cardinal; Founder, St. Joseph's Foreign Mission Society of Mill Hill (Mill Hill Missionaries)	Westminster	Heroic Virtues
	Thomas [Roussel Davids] Byles	26 February 1870; Leeds, West Yorkshire, England	15 April 1912 aboard the RMS Titanic, at the North Atlantic Ocean	Diocesan Priest	Brentwood	Offer of Life
	Agnes McLaren	4 July 1837; Edinburgh, Scotland	17 April 1913; Antibes, Alpes-Maritimes, France	Layperson; Member, Lay Dominicans	Saint Andrews-Edinburgh	Heroic Virtues
	Robert Hugh Benson	18 November 1871; Crowthorne, Berkshire, England	19 October 1914; Salford, Greater Manchester, England	Diocesan Priest	Westminster	Heroic Virtues
	Honoria Gaffney (rel. name: Mary Evangelista)	1 May 1853; Kilronan, County Galway, Ireland	21 July 1920; Nottingham, England	Professed Religious, Sisters of Saint Joseph of Peace	Nottingham	Heroic Virtues
	Henry Palmer Chapman (rel. name: John)	25 April 1865; Ashfield cum Thorpe, Suffolk, England	7 November 1933; Stratton-on-the-Fosse, Somerset, France	Professed Priest, Benedictines (English Congregation)	Clifton	Heroic Virtues
	Cyril Jarrett (rel. name: Bede)	22 August 1881; Greenwich, Greater London, England	17 March 1934; London, England	Professed Priest, Dominicans	Birmingham	Heroic Virtues
	Gilbert Keith Chesterton	29 May 1874; Kensington, Greater London, England	14 June 1936; Beaconsfield, Buckinghamshire, England	Married Layperson	Northampton	Heroic Virtues
	Robert John Cairns	21 August 1884; Glasgow, Scotland	14 December 1941; Shangchuan, Guangdong, China	Priest of the Maryknoll Missionary Society	Glasgow	Martyr in odium fidei, uti fertur
	Edward Charles [Ted] Harris	19 July 1905; London, England	21 December 1942; Malmal, Pomio, East New Britain, Papua New Guinea	Professed Priest, Missionaries of the Sacred Heart	Rabaul	Martyr in odium fidei, uti fertur
	Joseph McNabb (rel. name: Vincent)	8 July 1868; Portaferry, County Down, Ireland	17 June 1943; London, England	Professed Priest, Dominicans	Westminster	Heroic Virtues
	Caryll Houselander	29 September 1901; Bath, Somerset, England	12 October 1954; London, England	Layperson of the Archdiocese of Birmingham	Birmingham	Heroic Virtues
	John Cyril Hawes	7 September 1876; Richmond, Greater London, England	26 June 1956; Miami, Florida, United States	Diocesan Priest	Geraldton and Nassau	Heroic Virtues
	Laurence Samuel Gerald Vann	24 August 1906; St Mary Cray, Greater London, England	14 July 1963; Newcastle upon Tyne, Tyne and Wear, England	Professed Priest, Dominicans	Westminster	Heroic Virtues
	Olive-Marie Bradley (rel. name: Marguerite)	14 January 1911; Birkenhead, Merseyside, England	25 November 1964; Dakwa, Bas-Uélé, Democratic Republic of Congo	Professed Religious, Ursuline Sisters of Hasselt	Buta	Martyr in odium fidei, uti fertur
	Margaret Walker (rel. name: Mary Charles Magdalene)	16 March 1881; Brighton, East Sussex, England	27 February 1966; Calabar, Cross River, Nigeria	Founder, Handmaids of the Holy Child Jesus	Calabar	Heroic Virtues
	Peter Biewer (rel. name: Aelred)	23 June 1932; Middlesbrough, North Yorkshire, England	24 December 1969; Nyegezi, Mwanza, Tanzania	Brother of the Missionaries of Africa (White Fathers)	Mwana	Martyr in odium fidei, uti fertur
	Christopher Henry Dawson	12 October 1889; Hay-on-Wye, Brecknockshire, Wales	25 May 1970; Budleigh Salterton, Devon, England	Married Layperson	Plymouth	Heroic Virtues
	John Ronald Reuel Tolkien	3 January 1892; Bloemfontein, Free State, South Africa	2 September 1973; Bournemouth, Dorset, England	Married Layperson	Birmingham	Heroic Virtues
	Martin Thomas	25 April 1932; Sidcup, Greater London, England	6 February 1977; Musami, Harare, Zimbabwe	Professed Priest, Jesuits	Harare	Martyrs in odium fidei, uti fertur
	Christopher Shepherd-Smith	28 January 1943; Geita, Tanzania	6 February 1977; Musami, Harare, Zimbabwe	Professed Priest, Jesuits	Harare	Martyrs in odium fidei, uti fertur
	Pauline Wilkinson (rel. name: Mary Joseph)	29 June 1917; Leigh, Greater Manchester, England	6 February 1977; Musami, Harare, Zimbabwe	Professed Religious, Dominican Missionary Sisters of the Sacred Heart of Jesus	Harare	Martyrs in odium fidei, uti fertur
	Desmond Donovan	10 October 1927; Leeds, West Yorkshire, England	15 January 1978 (disappeared); Makumbi, Goromonzi, Mashonaland East, Zimbabwe	Professed Priest, Jesuits	Harare	Martyr in odium fidei, uti fertur
	Bernard Darke	19 July 1925; Bournemouth, Dorset, England	14 July 1979; Georgetown, Guyana	Professed Priest, Jesuits	Portsmouth	Heroic Virtues
	John Francis McGrath	24 May 1919; Birmingham, England	24 April 1980; Mbale, Uganda	Priest of the Mill Hill Missionaries	Birmingham	Martyr in odium fidei, uti fertur
	Douglas William Main (rel. name: John)	21 January 1926; London, England	30 December 1982; Montreal, Quebec, Canada	Professed Priest, Benedictines (English Congregation)	Montreal and Westminster	Heroic Virtues
	Thomas Malcolm Muggeridge	24 March 1903; Sanderstead, Surrey, England	14 November 1990; Robertsbridge, East Sussex, England	Married Layperson	Arundel-Brighton	Heroic Virtues
	Sean Devereux	25 November 1964; Camberley, Surrey, England	2 January 1993; Kismayo, Jubbada Hoose, Somalia	Layperson; Member, Salesian Cooperators	Arundel-Brighton	Martyr in odium fidei, uti fertur
	Alan Richard Griffiths (rel. name: Swami Dayananda [Bede])	17 December 1906; Walton-on-Thames, Surrey, England	13 May 1993; Tannirpalli, Tamil Nadu, India	Professed Priest, Benedictines (Camaldolese Congregation)	Tiruchirapalli	Heroic Virtues
	Kathleen Rosalind Dobbs Muggeridge	8 December 1903; Château-d'Œx, Vaud, Switzerland	11 June 1994; Welland, Ontario, Canada	Married Layperson	Arundel-Brighton	Heroic Virtues
	Christoper Mannion	15 May 1951; Thornaby-on-Tees, North Yorkshire, England	1 July 1994; Save, Gisagara, Rwanda	Professed Religious, Marist Brothers of the Schools	Butare	Martyr in odium fidei, uti fertur
	George Haliburton Hume (rel. name: George Basil)	2 March 1923; Newcastle upon Tyne, Tyne and Wear, England	17 June 1999; London, England	Archbishop of Westminster; Cardinal	Westminster and Hexham-Newcastle	Heroic Virtues
	Eileen Mary Egan	27 December 1911; Pontypridd, Mid Glamorgan, Wales	7 October 2000; New York City, New York, United States	Layperson; Member, Catholic Relief Services; Cofounder, Pax Christi USA	New York	Heroic Virtues
	Gertrude Elizabeth Margaret Anscombe Geach	18 March 1919; Limerick, Ireland	5 January 2001; Cambridge, England	Married Layperson	East Anglia	Heroic Virtues
	Joan Bartlett	1 August 1911; Lancaster, Lancashire, England	9 September 2002; London, England	Layperson; Founder, Servite Secular Institute	Westminster	Heroic Virtues
	Leader Dominic Stirling	19 January 1906; Finchley, Greater London, England	7 February 2003; Dar-es-Salaam, Tanzania	Married Layperson	Dar-es-Salaam	Heroic Virtues
	Mary Sunniva Garson	3 October 1921; Udny Green, Aberdeenshire, Scotland	8 March 2007; Bognor Regis, Sussex, England	Founder, Benedictine Sisters of Grace and Compassion	Arundel-Brighton	
	Tommy "Thomas" Burns	16 December 1956; Calton, Glasgow, Scotland	15 May 2008; Glasgow, Scotland	Married Layperson	Glasgow	Heroic Virtues
	Brian Hilary Thorp	30 January 1931; Yorkshire Bridge, Bamford, Derbyshire, England	9 September 2008; London, England	Brother of the Mill Hill Missionaries	Malindi	Martyr in odium fidei, uti fertur
	Joseph Wilson	12 December 1994; Carfin, Motherwell, Scotland	20 December 2011; Wishaw, North Lanarkshire, Scotland	Young Layperson	Motherwell	Heroic Virtues
	Peter Thomas Geach	29 March 1916; Chelsea, County of London, England	21 December 2013; Cambridge, England	Married Layperson	East Anglia	Heroic Virtues
	Edward Kevin Daly	5 December 1933; Ballyshannon, County Donegal, Ireland	8 August 2016; Derry, Northern Ireland	Bishop of Derry	Derry	Heroic Virtues
	Michelle Frieda Totah (rel. name: Mary David)	26 March 1957; Philadelphia, Pennsylvania, United States	28 August 2017; Isle of Wight, England	Professed Religious, Benedictine Nuns	Portsmouth	Heroic Virtues
	Pedro Ballester Arenas	22 May 1996; Manchester, England	31 January 2018; Manchester, England	Young Layperson; Member, Opus Dei Movement	Manchester	Heroic Virtues
	Peter Joseph Reilly	11 February 1915; Saltcoats, North Ayrshire, Scotland	2 July 2018; Saltcoats, North Ayrshire, Scotland	Married Layperson	Galloway	Heroic Virtues
	Paul McAuley	29 October 1947; Portsmouth, Hampshire, England	2 April 2019; Iquitos, Belén, Maynas, Peru	Professed Religious, Brothers of the Christian Schools (De La Salle Brothers)	Portsmouth	Martyr in odium fidei, uti fertur
	Michael Strode	5 June 1923; Woking, Surrey, England	27 December 2019; Cardiff, Wales	Oblate, Cistercians of the Strict Observance (Trappists)	Cardiff-Menevia	Heroic Virtues
	Audrey Gladys Donnithorne	27 November 1922; Santai, Sichuan, China	9 June 2020; Hong Kong	Layperson	Hong Kong	Heroic Virtues
	Ryan Stawaisz	18 August 1989; Aberdeen, Scotland	21 June 2021; Tomball, Texas, United States	Diocesan Priest	Galveston-Houston	Heroic Virtues
	David Anthony Andrew Amess	26 March 1952; Plaistow, Essex, England	15 October 2021; Leigh-on-Sea, Essex, England	Married Layperson	Brentwood	Martyr in odium fidei, uti fertur
	Janet Evelyn Longton Tempest	c. 1930; Buenos Aires, Argentina	25 December 2021; Broughton Hall, North Yorkshire, England	Married Layperson	Leeds	Heroic Virtues
80px	Katharine, Duchess of Kent	22 February 1933; Hovingham, England	4 September 2025; Kensington Palace, London, England	Married Layperson	Westminster	Heroic Virtues

== See also ==
- List of Catholic martyrs of the English Reformation
- List of post-reformation saints in Ireland
- List of American candidates for sainthood
- List of Canadian Catholic saints and beatified people
- List of Scandinavian saints
