= List of post-Reformation Catholic saints in Ireland =

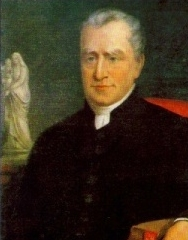
Edmund Ignatius Rice was the first Irish-born Catholic to be beatified after the English Reformation

The Catholic Church recognises certain deceased Catholics as saints, beati, venerabili, and servants of God. In the post-Reformation period, some such people were born, died, or lived in Ireland.

== Saints ==
- Joannes Andreas Houben (Charles of Saint Andrew) (1821–1893), Professed Priest of the Passionists (Limburg, Netherlands – Dublin, Ireland)
  - Declared "Venerable": 10 May 1979
  - Beatified: 16 October 1988 by Pope John Paul II
  - Canonized: 3 June 2007 by Pope Benedict XVI

== Blesseds ==
- Edmund Ignatius Rice (1762–1844), Widower; Founder of the Irish Christian Brothers and the Presentation Brothers of Mary (Kilkenny – Waterford City, Ireland)
  - Declared "Venerable": 2 April 1993
  - Beatified: 6 October 1996 by Pope John Paul II
- Joseph Marmion (Columba) (1858–1923), Professed Priest of the Benedictines (Annunciation Congregation) (Dublin, Ireland – Namur, Belgium)
  - Declared "Venerable": 28 June 1999
  - Beatified: 3 September 2000 by Pope John Paul II
- John Sullivan (1861–1933), Professed Priest of the Jesuits (Dublin, Ireland)
  - Declared "Venerable": 7 November 2014
  - Beatified: 13 May 2017 by Cardinal Angelo Amato, S.D.B.

== Venerables ==
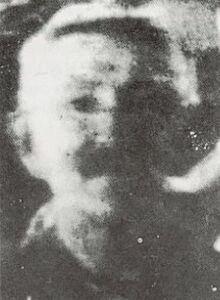
Ven. Matt Talbot

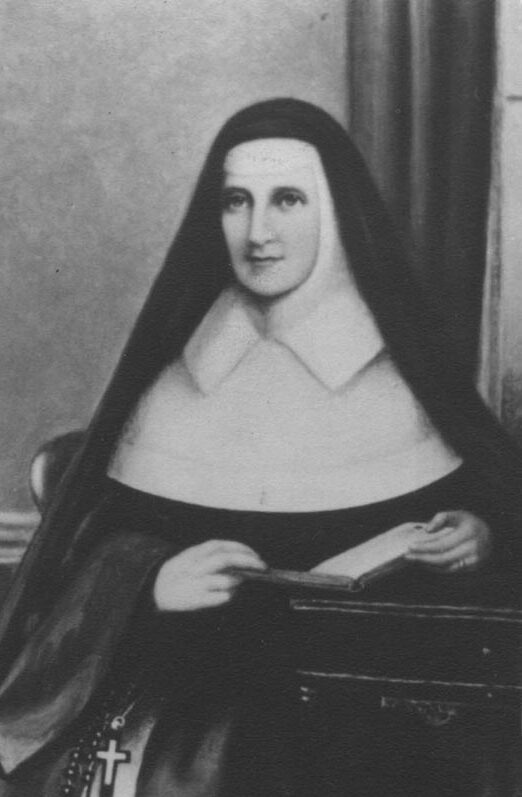
Ven. Catherine McAuley

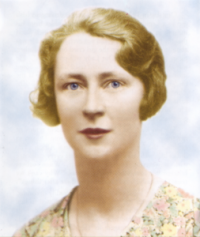
Ven. Edel Mary Quinn

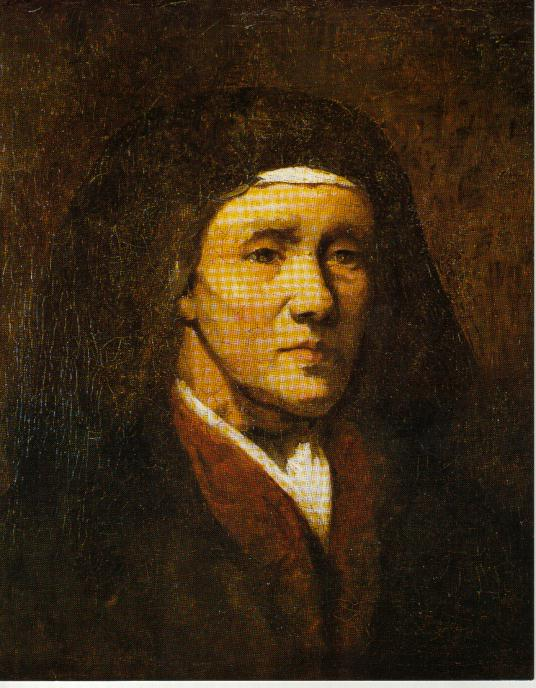
Ven. Nano Nagle

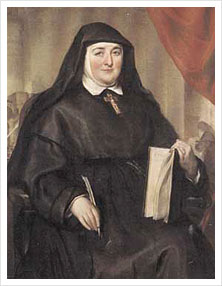
Ven. Mary Aieknhead

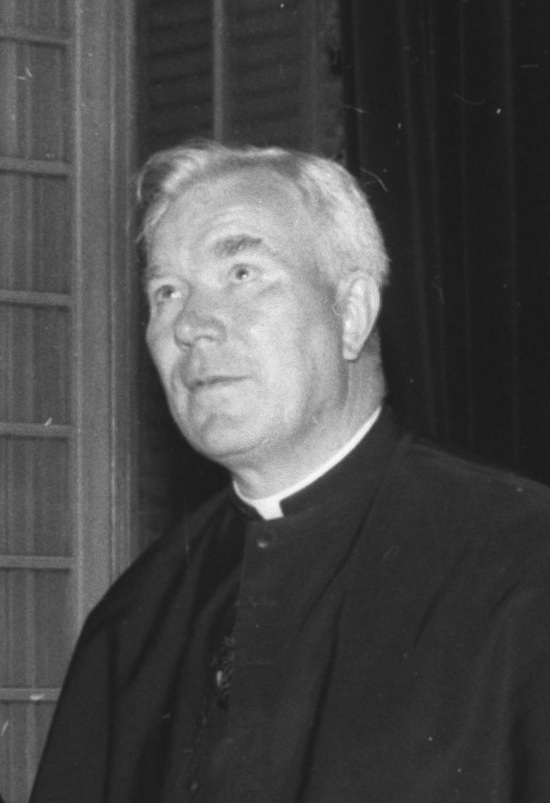
Ven. Patrick Peyton
- Matt Talbot (1856–1925), Layperson of the Archdiocese of Dublin; Member of the Secular Franciscans (Dublin, Ireland)
  - Declared "Venerable": 3 October 1975
- Catherine McAuley (1778–1841), Founder of the Congregation of the Sisters of Mercy (Dublin, Ireland)
  - Declared "Venerable": 9 April 1990
- Edel Mary Quinn (1907–1944), Layperson of the Archdioceses of Nairobi and Dublin; Member of the Legion of Mary (Cork, Ireland – Nairobi, Kenya)
  - Declared "Venerable": 15 December 1994
- Honora [Nano] Nagle (1718–1784), Founder of the Presentation Sisters of the Blessed Virgin Mary (Cork, Ireland)
  - Declared "Venerable": 31 October 2013
- Mary Aikenhead (1787–1858), Founder of the Religious Sisters of Charity of Ireland (Cork – Dublin, Ireland)
  - Declared "Venerable": 18 March 2015
- Patrick Peyton (1909–1992), Professed Priest of the Congregation of Holy Cross (Mayo, Ireland – California, United)
  - Declared "Venerable": December 18, 2017

== Servants of God ==
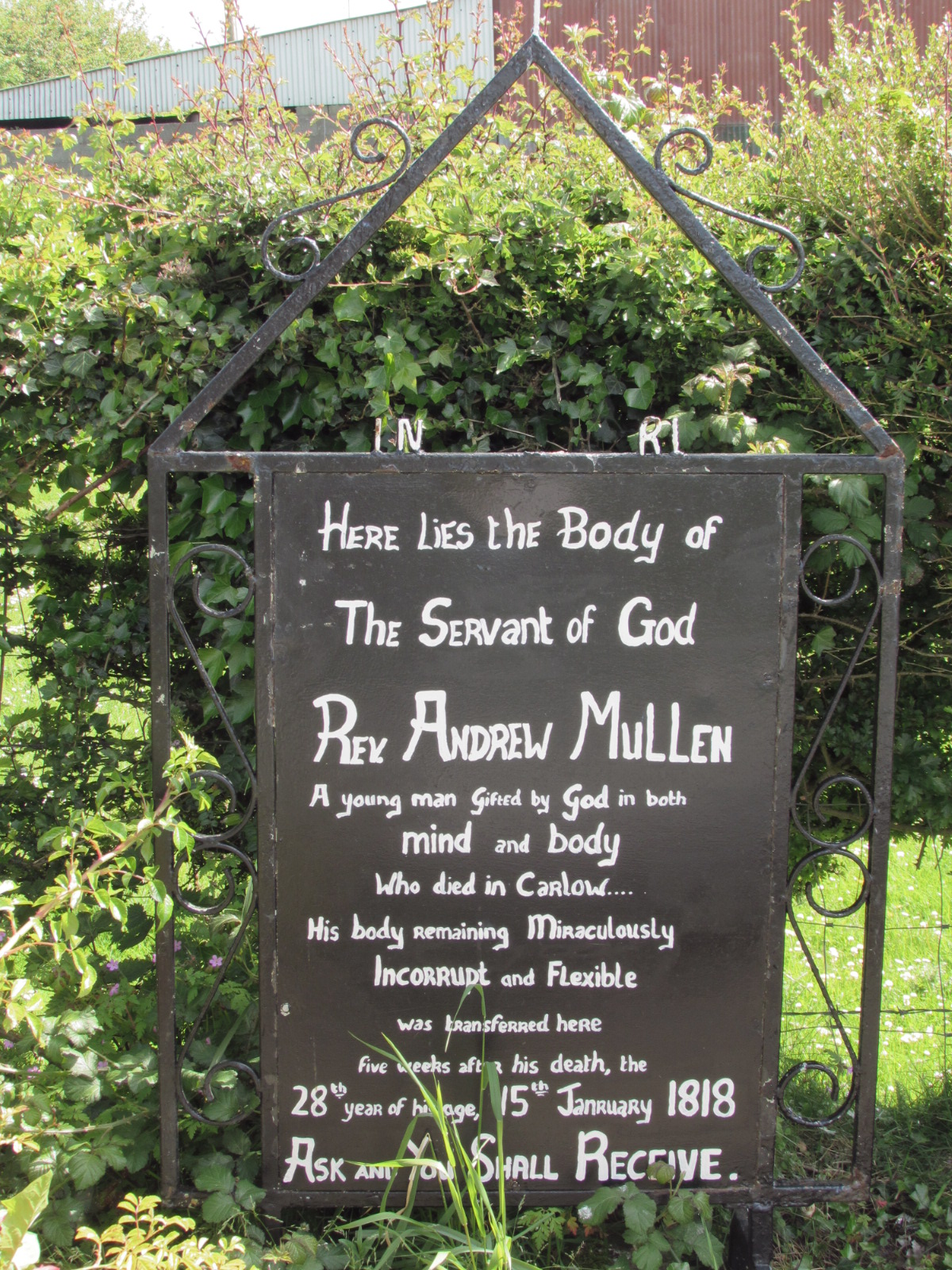
Tomb of Fr. Andrew Mullen

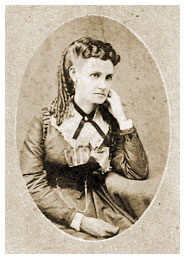
Mo. Margaret Mary Healy Murphy

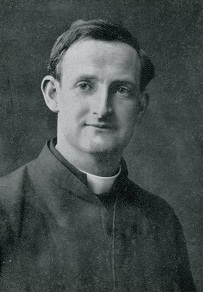
Fr. Willie Doyle

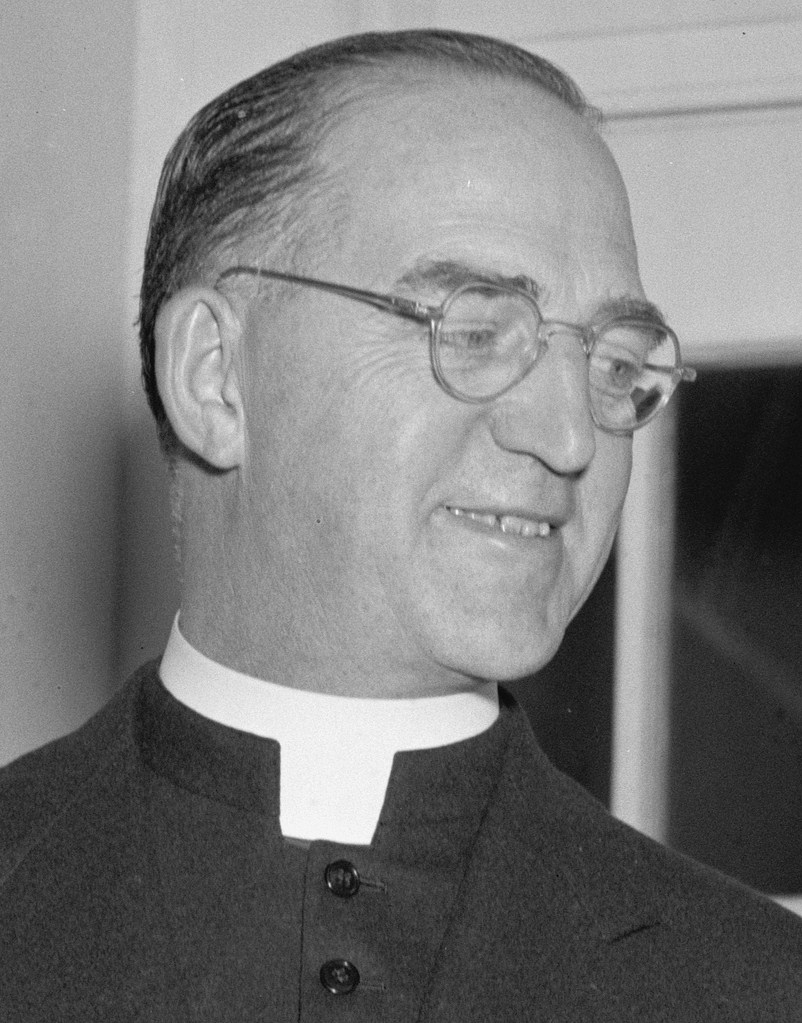
Fr. Edward J. Flanagan

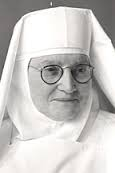
Mo. Mary Kevin Kearney

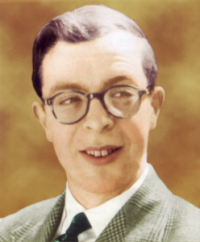
Alfie Lambe

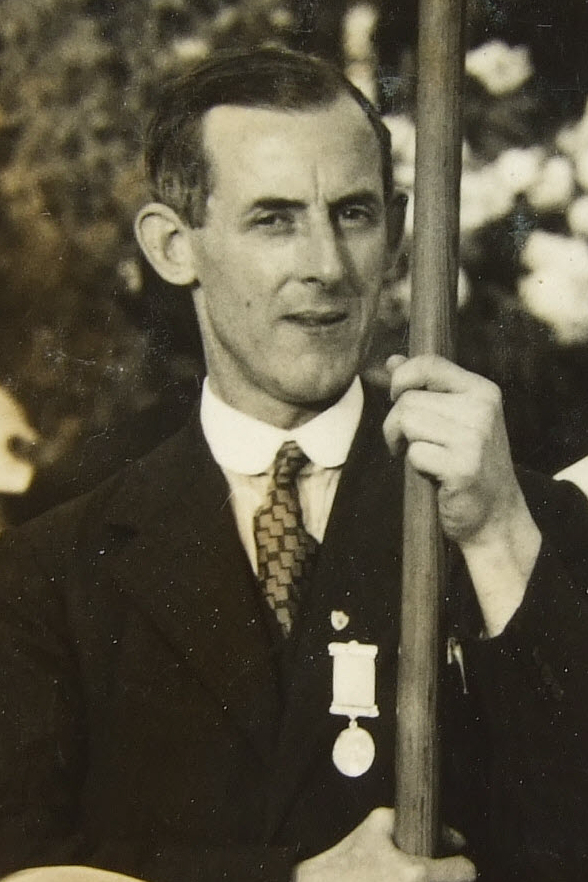
Frank Duff
- Andrew Mullen (1790–1818), Priest of the Diocese of Kildaire and Leighlin (Offaly – Kilkenny, Ireland)
- Alice O'Sullivan (Louise) (1836–1870), Vowed Member of the Daughters of Charity of Saint Vincent de Paul; Martyr (Tipperary, Ireland – Hebei, China)
- Patrick Ryan (1845–1878), Priest of the Diocese of Knoxville (Tipperary, Ireland – Tennessee, United States)
- Margaret Mary Healy Murphy (1833–1907), Widow; Founder of the Sisters of the Holy Spirit and Mary Immaculate (Cahersiveen, Ireland – Texas, United States)
- William [Willie] Doyle (1873–1917), Professed Priest of the Jesuits (Dublin, Ireland – Zonnebeke, Belgium)
- Joseph Shanahan (1871–1943), Professed Priest of the Congregation of the Holy Spirit (Spiritans); Bishop of Onitsha; Founder of the Missionary Sisters of Our Lady of the Holy Rosary (Tipperary, Ireland – Nairobi, Kenya)
- Edward Joseph Flanagan (1886–1948), Priest of the Archdiocese of Omaha (Roscommon, Ireland – Nebraska, United States)
- Martyrs of North Korea
  - Anthony Collier (1913–1950), Priest of the Missionary Society of Saint Columban; Martyr (Louth, Ireland – Gangwon, South Korea)
  - Patrick Reilly (1915–1950), Priest of the Missionary Society of Saint Columban; Martyr (Westmeath, Ireland – Gangwon, South Korea)
  - Thomas Cusack (1910–1950), Priest of the Missionary Society of Saint Columban; Martyr (Clare, Ireland – Daejeon, South Korea)
  - John O'Brien (1924–1950), Priest of the Missionary Society of Saint Columban; Martyr (Roscommon, Ireland – Daejeon, South Korea)
  - Francis Canavan (1915–1950), Priest of the Missionary Society of Saint Columban; Martyr (Galway, Ireland – Chagang, North Korea)
- Teresa Kearney (Mary Kevin) (1875–1957), Founder of the Little Sisters of Saint Francis and the Franciscan Missionary Sisters for Africa (Wicklow, Ireland – Massachusetts, United States)
- Alphonsus [Alfie] Lambe (1932–1959), Layperson of the Archdiocese of Buenos Aires; Member of the Legion of Mary (Offaly, Ireland – Buenos Aires, Argentina)
- Francis Michael [Frank] Duff (1889–1980), Layperson of the Archdiocese of Dublin; Founder of the Legion of Mary (Dublin, Ireland)
- Declan O'Toole (1971–2002), Priest of the Mill Hill Missionaries; Martyr (Galway, Ireland – Kotido, Uganda)
- Colm O'Brien (1973–2009), Priest of the Diocese of Waterford and Lismore (Waterford City – Dublin, Ireland)
- Clare Crockett (1982–2016), nun who died in the 2016 Ecuador earthquake and was declared as Servant of God in 2024.

== Candidates for sainthood ==
- John Christopher Drumgoole (1816–1888), Priest of the Archdiocese of New York; Founder of the Sisters of Francis of the Mission of the Immaculate Virgin (Longford, Ireland – New York, United States)
- Patrick Manogue (1831–1895), Bishop of Sacramento (Kilkenny, Ireland – California, United States)
- Geraldine Gibbons (Scholastica) (1817–1901), Founder of the Sisters of the Good Samaritan (Kinsale, Ireland – New South Wales, Australia)
- Timothy Leonard (1893–1929), Priest of the Missionary Society of Saint Columban (Limerick, Ireland – Jiangxi, China)
- Johanna Butler (Marie Joseph) (1860–1940), Professed Religious of the Religious of the Sacred Heart of Mary (Kilkenny, Ireland – New York, United States)
- Martyrs of the 1945 Battle of Manila, Philippines:
  - John Heneghan (1882–1945), Priest of the Missionary Society of Saint Columban (Mayo, Ireland – Manila, Philippines)
  - William Kelly (Egbert Xavier) (1894–1945), Professed Religious of the Brothers of the Christian Schools (De La Salle Brothers) (Wicklow, Ireland – Manila, Philippines)
- Hugh O'Flaherty (1898–1963), Priest of the Vicariate of Rome (Cork – Kerry, Ireland)

== See also ==
- List of post-reformation saints in the United Kingdom
- List of Catholic martyrs of the English Reformation
- List of American candidates for sainthood
- List of Canadian Catholic saints and beatified people
- List of Scandinavian saints
