= Mary Vincent =

Mary Vincent may refer to:

- Mary Ann Vincent (1818–1887), British-born American actress
- Mary Sauer (Mary Sauer-Vincent, born 1975), American pole vaulter
- Mary Vincent (artist) (born 1963), survivor of rape and dismemberment who went on to become an artist and create her own prosthetics for daily tasks
- Mary Vincent Conway (1815–1892), Irish-born Canadian educator
- Mary Vincent Hammon (1633–1705), English woman prosecuted for homosexuality
- Mary Vincent Whitty (1819–1892), Irish-born Australian Roman Catholic nun
