= Sunday (2002 film) =

2002 British drama television film by Charles McDougall

- Written by: Jimmy McGovern
- Directed by: Charles McDougall
- Starring: Ciarán McMenamin; Brid Brennan; Christopher Eccleston; Sean Chapman; Kenny Doughty
- Country of origin: United Kingdom
- Original language: English

Production
- Running time: 90 minutes

Original release
- Network: Channel 4
- Release: 28 January 2002

Sunday is a television drama, produced by Sunday Productions for Channel 4 and screened on 28 January 2002. It dramatises the events of Bloody Sunday in Derry, Northern Ireland, through the eyes of the families of the dead and injured, specifically those of Leo Young, older brother of John Young, who was killed on the day. The timescale covers events in the years prior to Bloody Sunday, and subsequent events up to and including the Widgery Tribunal.

It was written by Jimmy McGovern and directed by Charles McDougall, and the Channel 4 transmission was followed by a live studio debate about the issues involved. It was overshadowed by the rival Bloody Sunday, shown eight days previously by ITV.

While the ITV's Bloody Sunday filmed most of its scenes in Ballymun in Dublin, Sunday filmed the majority of its scenes in Derry itself. Streets and areas where the actual events of Bloody Sunday happened were used by the production team, such as William Street, Creggan, Craigavon Bridge and Harvey Street, where Father Edward Daly was, in a well-known scene, filmed waving a blood stained handkerchief escorting men carrying one of the victims, Jackie Duddy.

It was released on DVD in the United Kingdom in February 2007.

The film was the debut of Clare Crockett, who gave up acting to become a nun and died during missionary work in Ecuador in 2016.
