= Ambrose Phillipps De Lisle =

English Catholic convert (1809–1878)

Ambrose Lisle March Phillipps de Lisle (17 March 1809 – 5 March 1878) was a British Roman Catholic convert. He founded Mount St Bernard Abbey, a Trappist abbey in Leicestershire, and worked for the reconversion or reconciliation of Britain to Catholicism.

== Early life ==
Phillipps de Lisle was the son of Charles March-Phillipps of Garendon Hall, Leicestershire, and Harriet Ducarel, daughter of Gerald Gustavus Ducarel, of Walford, Somerset. The de Lisle family of Leicestershire were originally the Phillippses from London. The Garendon estate, near Loughborough, was inherited by Thomas March, who adopted the name Phillipps, and married Susan de Lisle. Their son, Charles, adopted the de Lisle crest and arms. Steady accumulation of landed property made him one of the "wealthiest commoners" in England. When Charles March-Phillipps died in 1862, Ambrose took the additional name of Lisle, becoming Ambrose Charles Lisle March Phillipps de Lisle.

He spent his earliest years at his birthplace and was brought up as a member of the Church of England, receiving his first religious instruction from his uncle, William March Phillipps, a High Church clergyman. In 1818, de Lisle was sent to a private school in South Croxton, whence he was removed in 1820 to Maisemore Court School, near Gloucester, kept by the Rev. George Hodson. The Bishop of Gloucester, Henry Ryder, having married Sophia March Phillipps, was his uncle by marriage, and so the boy spent Sundays and holidays at the bishop's palace.

At school, he met for the first time a Roman Catholic, the Abbé Giraud, a French émigré priest. A visit to Paris in 1823 gave him his first acquaintance with Catholic liturgy. The effect on his mind was shown on his return home when he persuaded the Anglican rector to place a crucifix on the communion table, but this first effort to restore the cross to English churches was stopped by the Bishop of Peterborough. De Lisle converted to Catholicism, and immediately left Hodson's school and returned home with his father, who arranged for him to continue his preparation for the university under the private tuition of the Rev. William Wilkinson. He was obliged every Sunday to attend the Anglican church, but did not join in the service.

Phillipps de Lisle was admitted to Trinity College, Cambridge in November 1825, although he did not go into residence there until 16 October 1826. At the university, he found a friend in Kenelm Digby, author of Mores Catholici and The Broadstone of Honour, who was, like himself, a member of a long-established family of the gentry and a recent convert. There was no Roman Catholic chapel then at Cambridge, and every Sunday for two years, the two young Catholics used to ride, fasting, over to St Edmund's College, Ware, a distance of twenty-five miles, for Mass and Communion. It was on one of these visits to St Edmund's, in April 1828, that de Lisle was seized with a serious illness, having broken a blood vessel in his lung. The doctors recommended his father to take him to Italy for the winter, and this necessarily cut short his Cambridge career, so that he had to leave the university without taking his degree. Upon his return to England in 1829, he became acquainted with the Hon. George Spencer, then an Anglican clergyman, and his conversation was largely instrumental in leading to Spencer's conversion, as the latter admits in his Account of my Conversion — "I passed many hours daily in conversation with Phillipps and was satisfied beyond all expectations with the answers he gave me to the different questions I proposed about the principal tenets and practices of Catholics". The following winter (1830–1831), de Lisle again spent in Italy, on which occasion he met Antonio Rosmini-Serbati, who made a great impression on him.

On 25 July 1833, Phillipps de Lisle married Laura Mary, eldest daughter of the Hon. Thomas Clifford, son of Hugh, fourth Baron Clifford of Chudleigh, at St James' Roman Catholic Church, Spanish Place, London. Charles March Phillipps gave his son possession of the second family estate, the manor of Grace-Dieu in Leicestershire, which before the Protestant Reformation had been the Augustinian Grace Dieu Priory. Here Ambrose Phillipps built a new manor-house Grace Dieu Manor, 1833–34.

In the meantime, he and his wife resided at Leamington, or at Garendon Hall. Writing a few years before his death, he thus summed up the chief aims of his own life:

There were three great objects to which I felt after my own conversion as a boy of fifteen specially drawn by internal feeling for the whole space of forty-five years which have since elapsed. The first was to restore to England the primitive monastic contemplative observance, which God enabled me to do in the foundation of the Trappist monastery of Mount St Bernard. The second was the restoration of the primitive ecclesiastical chant, my edition of which is now recommended by the Archbishop of Westminster for the use of churches and chapels. The third was the restoration of the Anglican Church to Catholic Unity.

== Catholic revival ==
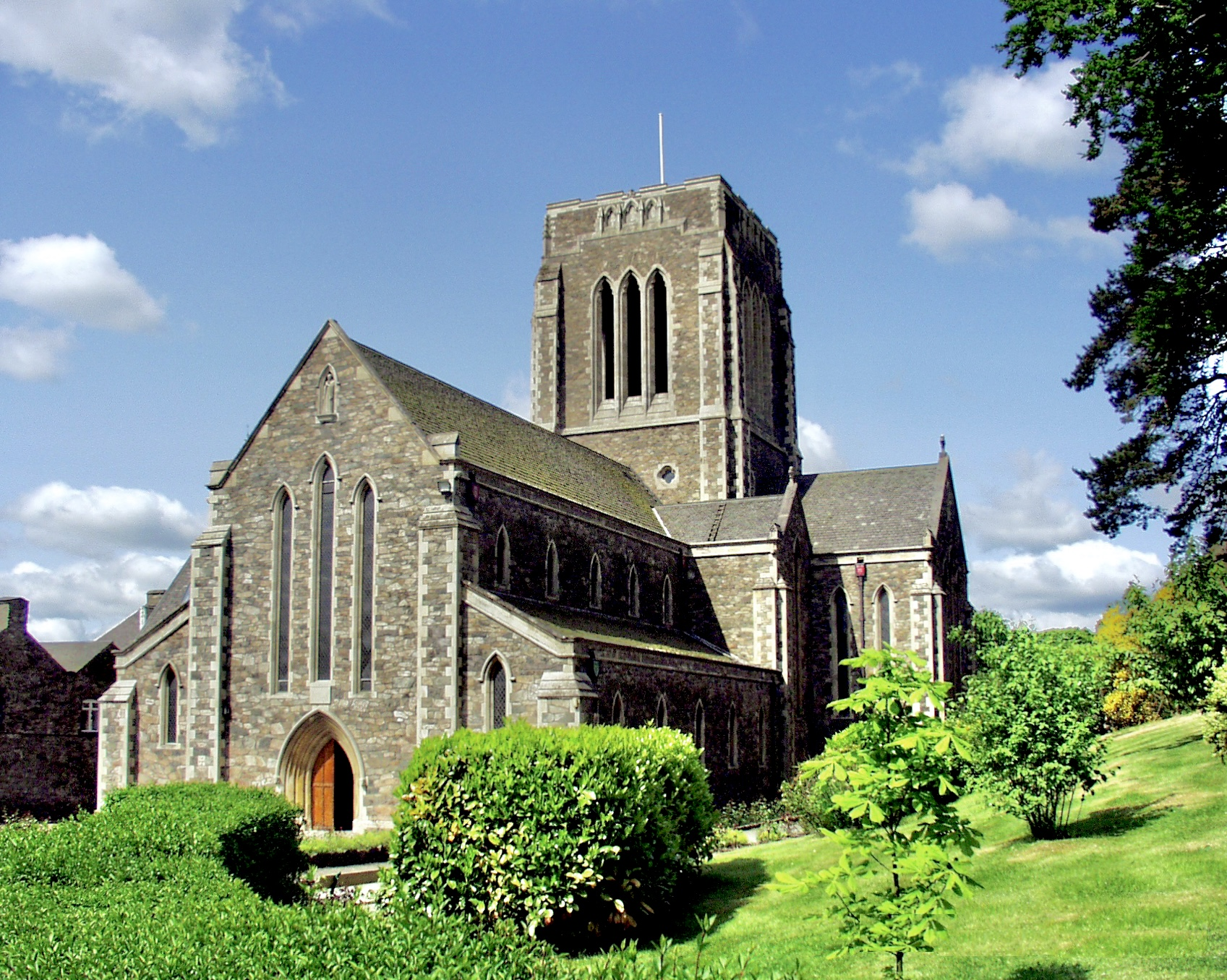
Mount St Bernard Abbey

According to Purcell, "In that early day no one did more for the Catholic revival in England, almost single-handed, than Phillipps de Lisle".

In the foundation of the Cistercian Mount St Bernard Abbey in Leicestershire, de Lisle received generous support from his friend John, Earl of Shrewsbury, but it was he himself who conceived the idea, believing it necessary that the ascetic aspect of Catholic life should be presented to the English people. Mount St Bernard Abbey was the first monastery built in England since the Reformation. He gave both land and money, severely depleting his own resources in providing the necessary buildings. This work was begun in 1835 and completed in 1844, while during the same period, he founded missions at Grace-Dieu and Whitwick. His disappointment was great when he found that the Trappists were prevented by their rule from undertaking active missionary work, because he attached the greatest importance to a supply of zealous missionary priests who would labour in English villages; he said, "I would have them go about and preach everywhere on the foreign plan, in the fields or in the high roads even".

In 1838, he joined his friend Rev. George Spencer in establishing and propagating the Association of Universal Prayer for the Conversion of England. In a continental tour he and Spencer made together, accompanied by Mrs Phillipps and two of her children, in 1844, they passed through Belgium, Germany, and north Italy, meeting many distinguished Catholics and enlisting the sympathy of prelates and clergy in the cause. Nicholas Wiseman was co-operating in Rome, and soon the movement spread widely through the Catholic world. de Lisle was for some time the only Catholic who was in confidential correspondence with the leaders of the Oxford Movement, including John Henry Newman, receiving them at Grace-Dieu. He saw the Movement as a step towards his desire of reconciling the Anglican Church with Rome. As his son stated:

National Conversion by means of Corporate Reunion he likened unto the Apostolic practice of fishing with a net "gathering in multitudes of all kinds of fishes". And this he considered to be his own special call from on High, to prepare the way and hasten the time when the Divine Word should again be spoken to Peter, 'Cast your nets into the deep".

== Association for the Promotion of the Unity of Christendom ==
Phillipps de Lisle welcomed the restoration of the English Catholic hierarchy in 1850, and tried to reconcile to it some of the Catholic laymen who thought it inexpedient. During the debates that ensued throughout the country, he wrote two pamphlets: A Letter to Lord Shrewsbury on the Re-establishment of the Hierarchy and the Present Position of Catholic Affairs, and A Few Words on Lord John Russell's Letter to the Bishop of Durham. The progress of events raised his hopes so high that he regarded the reconciliation of the Anglican Church to the Holy See as imminent, and to hasten its fulfilment, entered on a new crusade of prayer, in which the co-operation of non-Catholics was desired. The Association for Promoting the Unity of Christendom (A.P.U.C.) was founded on 8 September 1857 by fourteen people, including Father Lockhart, Fr. Collins, O. Cist., and de Lisle; the rest were Anglicans, with one exception, a Russo-Greek priest.

The only obligation incumbent on members, who might be Catholics, Anglicans, or Greeks, was to pray to God for the unity of the baptised body. At first, the association progressed rapidly. de Lisle wrote to Lord John Manners (Life, I, 415) saying, "We soon counted among our ranks many Catholic Bishops and Archbishops and Dignitaries of all descriptions from Cardinals downwards; the Patriarch of Constantinople and other great Eastern prelates, the Primate of the Russlart Church. ...I do not think any Anglican Bishops joined us, but a large number of clergy of the second order". He gave the number of members as nine thousand. The formation of this association was, however, regarded with distrust by Dr. (later Cardinal) Manning and other Catholics, who also took exception to de Lisle's treatise On the Future Unity of Christendom. The matter was referred to Rome and was finally settled by a papal rescript addressed Ad omnes episcopos Angliæ, dated 16 September 1864, which condemned the association and directed the bishops to take steps to prevent Catholics from joining it.

This was a great blow to de Lisle, who considered that "the authorities had been deceived by a false relation of facts". He however withdrew his name from the A.P.U.C. "under protest, as an act of submission to the Holy See". The grounds on which the association was condemned was that it subverted the Divine constitution of the Church, inasmuch as its aim rested on the supposition that the true Church consists partly of the Catholic Church in communion with Rome, "partly also of the Photian Schism and the Anglican heresy, to which equally with the Roman Church belong the one Lord, the one faith and one baptism" (Rescript, in Life, I, 388). His own pamphlet was not censured, but the condemnation of the A.P.U.C. was regarded by him as the death blow of his hopes for the reunion of Christendom during his own lifetime. However, his own belief in it persevered and influenced his views in other Catholic affairs. Thus, he supported the attendance of Catholics at the English universities, and he even approved of the abortive project of a Uniate English Church.

The rest of de Lisle's life passed without special incident, though he continued to take an interest in public affairs as affecting the fortunes of the Church, and in the same connection, he carried on intimate and cordial correspondence with men as different as Newman, William Ewart Gladstone, and Count de Montalembert. He counted among his friends John, Earl of Shrewsbury, Cardinal Wiseman, A. W. N. Pugin, who provided designs for Grace-Dieu, Frederick William Faber, and many other well-known Catholics, and though he differed on many points from Cardinal Manning and Dr. W.G. Ward, he remained on friendly terms with both. He died at Garendon, survived by his wife and eleven of his sixteen children.

== Legacy ==
Besides the pamphlets that have been mentioned, de Lisle's other published works include Mahometanism in its relation to Prophecy; or an Inquiry into the prophecies concerning Anti-Christ, with some reference to their bearing on the events of the present day (1855). He also translated Dominic Barberi's Lamentations of England (1831); Manzoni's Vindication of Catholic Morality (1836); Montalembert's St Elizabeth of Hungary (1839); Rio's La petite Chouannerie (1842); Maxims and Examples of the Saints (1844); and he compiled: Manual of Devotion for the Confraternity of the Living Rosary (1843); Catholic Christian's Complete Manual (1847); The Little Gradual (1847); Thesaurus animæ Christianæ (1847); Sequentiæ de Festis per Annum (1862).
