= Luisa Carvajal y Mendoza =

16th and 17th-century Spanish religious poet (1566–1614)

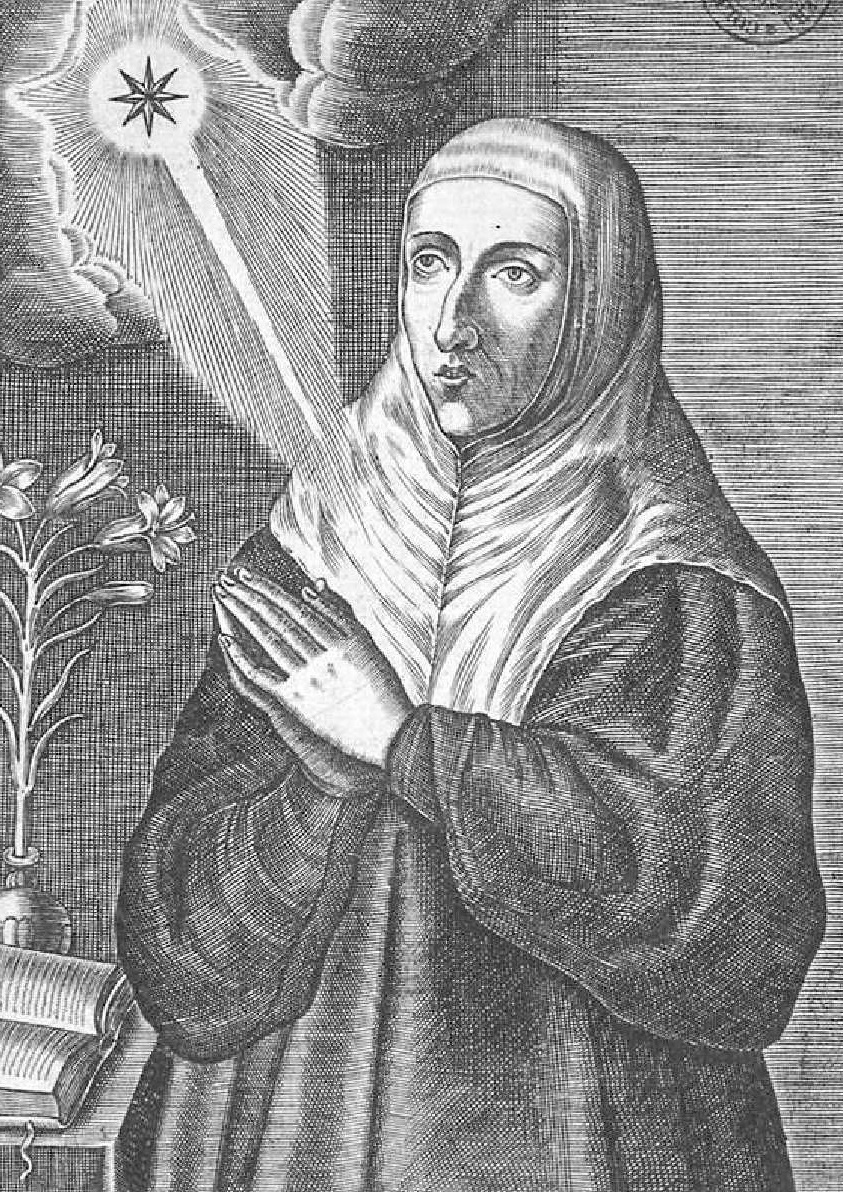
- A portrait of Luisa Carvajal y Mendoza printed by Juan de Courbes.
- Born: January 2, 1566; Jaraicejo, Spain
- Died: January 2, 1614 (aged 48); London, England
- Occupation: Missionary
- Religion: Catholicism

Luisa Carvajal y Mendoza (formerly known as Doña Luisa de Carvajal y Mendoza; January 2, 1566 – January 2, 1614) is best known for her mystical religious poetry as well as her fight to spread Catholicism throughout England, by preaching against Anglicanism. She was imprisoned on two occasions, once in 1608 and again in 1613 for her Catholic proselytizing activities in England. Although her cause of death makes her ineligible to be considered a martyr, she took a vow for martyrdom in 1598.

== Early life ==
Carvajal y Mendoza was born in Jaraicejo, Spain. She was born into a family of wealth and royal lineage. Her father was Francisco de Carvajal, whose father was a respected theologian and enthusiast of the Jesuit order. Carvajal's mother was Maria de Mendoza, who was a descendant of one of the most recognized families in Spain. However, at the age of six, both of her parents died of illness, and she was placed under the care of her aunt Maria Chacon, who was a governess in Madrid. She would live with her aunt until the age of ten.

When her aunt died, Carvajal went to Pamplona, where she was placed under the care of her uncle Francisco Hurtado a recognized diplomat and the First Marquis of Almazán. However, under his care, she felt as though she was in a prison. In one of the letters Carvajal wrote, she vividly depicts the penitential practices she was subject to.

Carvajal attended a private university where she obtained an education in literature and theology.

Following the death of her uncle in 1592, Carvajal in her writings suggests that this granted her a sense of freedom in that she could now fully live for Christ as she so desired to do. In a time when women either got married or went to convents to become nuns, she opted to pursue neither of these paths. Although she was acquainted with religion, it was not something that she was willing to give her life for until later on in her life.

=== Penitential practices ===
During Carvajal's time with her uncle Francisco Hurtado, penitential exercises became a habitual practice for Carvajal. Although in modern times, these penitential practices can appear to be a form of physical abuse and torture, it is important to realize that this mode of devotion was prominent during the 16th century in Spain. This form of penitence demonstrated one's devotion to God and the more one practiced this, the more the individual became empowered because they felt they were commemorating the death of Christ with their own bodies. Although women would punish themselves to mimic Christ's passion, in her adolescence her uncle ordered her punishment. These penitential practices influenced Carvajal in that later on in her life she would mortify her flesh as a symbol of meditating on Christ's Passion. Here is vivid description by Carvajal remembering her time in her uncle's household:

Later my uncle found another person among the same women of the household to serve in this, and at times he would order one [to discipline me], at times the other. And so, he would order at times that they lead me unclothed and barefoot, with my feet on the extremely cold floor, with a cap on my head that only held my hair, and a towel tied to my waist, a rope at my neck, which sometimes was made of hair bristles and others of hemp, and my hands tied with it, from one room to another, like an evil-doer, until arriving at the last small oratory that was beyond. It was a closed room and removed from the rest of the house and in a very secret part, and in front of me, pulling lightly by the rope, went one of the servile people of Our Lord of whom I have spoken, and at times she uttered words of humiliation and shame.

== Encounter with faith ==
=== Religious vows ===
Between 1593 and 1598 Carvajal took a series of religious vows. These included vows of poverty, chastity, obedience and spiritual perfection.

=== Vow of poverty ===
Although she grew up in an elite and aristocratic home, she refused these privileges and rather lived a humble life centered on spirituality. After the death of her uncle in 1592, Carvajal engaged in legal battle with her brother over their inheritance. Carvajal obtained her dowry and controversially decided to give the money to Jesuit priests. Carvajal rejected her nobility and began to distance herself from her family members as she began to abandon her royal customs. Family members often criticized and rejected Carvajal's behavior of associating herself with the poor. Carvajal became engaged in social reversals going as far as putting herself under the obedience of other women, cooking, fasting and even begging for food.

=== Vow of martyrdom ===
In 1598 she took a formal vow of martyrdom. She felt becoming a martyr served a double purpose. First to forgive the individual of their sins and second to die for Christ. In 1601, she was living in Valladolid, near a Jesuit College. She was able to meet and read some of the works Jesuits, further fueling her cause of martyrdom and proselytization. As a result of this vow she would be granted permission to journey to England where she joined the Catholic underground. Carvajal writes about the importance of martyrdom:

Y cada hora de dilacíon me parecía a mí un año; y hallabame con gran deseo de no perder nada que estuviese en mi mano de lo que con justicia creía me tocaba, por entregarlo todo a nuestro Señor y poder cumplir con las cosas que deseaba, y ayudar lo posible a la Misión de Inglaterra.
And every hour that passed seemed to me a year; and I was filled with a great wish not to lose what was in my hands to achieve that which I believed was rightly in my power, so I could in turn give it all to our Lord and accomplished what I wished and do what I could to help the English Mission.

== Life in London ==
Carvajal's motive to move to England was for the sole purpose of converting Anglicans to Catholicism and she was willing to die as a martyr for this cause. On January 24, 1605, Carvajal made her way from Valladolid to London. Father Henry Garnet had made the arrangements. She arrived in late 1605 shortly prior to the Gunpowder Plot. The failed plot led to heightened hostility against Catholics. Just six months after Carvajal had arrived in England, Father Henry Garnet was executed for having knowledge of Catholic plans against the English government.

Carvajal worked in London as a teacher and missionary. She was often referred to as a "Roman Priest in Women's clothing". She was a leader in charitable service to the poor such as taking care of the sick and helping prostitutes obtain a better life in England. She frequented prisons where she would visit imprisoned priests to encourage them to continue fighting for the Catholic cause. She would also, obtain money through needle work to give to the poor and distribute Catholic literature throughout England and abroad.

=== Relationship with Magdalena de San Jeronimo ===
Records indicate that the majority of Carvaja's letters and conversations were with a woman who went by the religious name of Magdalena de San Jeronimo, although letters show her name affiliated with that of a nun such as monja or sor (in Spanish), it is believed that she was not involved in a religious order. Their conversations largely dealt with the political situation of Catholics in England and Spain. Although Carvajal and San Jeronimo had been great correspondents, as hostility grew against Catholics in England, San Jeronimo began to become skeptical of Carvajal's stay in England and pleaded her to return to Spain, which would create tension between the two. In one of her letters, Carvajal lists the reasons as to why she wants to stay in England even though San Jeronimo and others urge her to come back:

And as to my return, your letters and your good company are very tempting, but I dare not leave without entrusting it more to Our Lord, for I fear defying his will, and do not yet find or base any good reason in his will for my return as I did for my departure" (Letter 46, Epistolario y Poesias, 165).

San Jeronimo would stop writing to Carvajal in 1607, thus ending their friendship. San Jeronimo later started a Galera, or a female prison which was built for female delinquents and prostitutes. Its goal was to reform the lives of these women so that they could marry or join a religious community upon release.

=== Society of the Sovereign Virgin Mary our Lady ===
Carvajal and five other women lived together in what they called the Society of the Sovereign Virgin Mary our Lady. Women in this society would partake in a life of fervent prayer and "were committed to violent and fortunate death for the confession of the holy Catholic faith". They were referred to as "Soldier maidens". Carvajal's society is referred to as a quasi-monastic institution in that they had similarities convents and nuns, for example in women's modest dress but differed in that women from convents often were forced by their families to enter and were not necessarily called to serve. The women Carvajal associated herself with, however, wanted to die for Christ. However, Anglicans such as George Abbot, the Archbishop of Canterbury would associate her society to monasticism. which was one of the reasons for her second imprisonment in 1613.

== Imprisonments ==
=== First imprisonment ===
Carvajal's first imprisonment occurred in June 1608. While in Cheapside, she began proselytizing about the virtues of Catholicism at great length. On a street she began arguing with citizens defending Catholicism as the true religion. This led to the arrest of her and two of her friends. Carvajal would remain jailed for four days. She was able to gain release with the help of the Spanish ambassador Pedro de Zuñiga, whom she stayed with at the Spanish embassy upon her arrival to England, however, Zuñiga begged her to leave London and return to Spain to which she declined.

=== Second imprisonment ===
Carvajal's second imprisonment would occur on October 28, 1613, when sheriffs were ordered by George Abbot, the Archbishop of Canterbury to break into her home and arrest her because she was allegedly planning on opening a convent, which went against English laws, as women were not allowed to gather together for religious purposes. This created a diplomatic conflict, as the King wanted to maintain peace with Spain. Once again, the Spanish Ambassador, this time Diego Sarmiento de Acuña, managed to set her free after three days of imprisonment. This time, however, she was forced to leave England. Sarmiento obtained her custody and did not deport her immediately; she stayed at the Spanish Embassy. Shortly after her release from prison, Carvajal would die from bronchial illness.

== Collection of letters and literary works ==
Records show that Carvajal left behind 50 spiritual poems and over 150 letters. Her poetry ranges from different styles such as pastoral poetry to sonnets. Carvajal's letters depict the ongoing political turmoil Catholics were facing in England at the time. Her letters contain extensive descriptions of her daily life in England as well as prayers asking those close to her for spiritual strength and prayers.

Perhaps the most frequent correspondent of Carvajal was Magdalena de San Jeronimo; who after a close friendship would not write again after she opposed Carvajal remaining in England. Ines de la Asuncion was another woman who kept extensive communication with Carvajal. Asuncion lived with Carvajal in Madrid and wanted to go to England but was not allowed to because her motive was not sufficiently religious.

=== Poem by Luisa Carvajal y Mendoza ===
Below is one of Carvajal's poem titled Spiritual Sonnet (18) which illustrates through analogy the process of allowing the word of God to enter one's life.

Spiritual Sonnet (18)
Receive, Silva, from your sweet Beloved
this close embrace, with immense love brimming,
and through my right side's opening
enter, little dove, within my breast.

Repose on the sacred flowering bed
and inflame yourself with love so passionate
that not until the strong knot has fully tied
will it ever be wholly satisfied.

See how I relinquish to you, my love,
all my being and eminence sublime.
cherish this gift by my love proffered,

You will find in me such glorious company,
and in my very own arms held tenderly
you will enjoy what no one has deserved.

== Death and legacy ==
Shortly after being released from her second imprisonment, Carvajal contracted a bronchial illness resulting in her death on her forty-eighth birthday in 1614. She died in London at the Spanish embassy.

Immediately after her death, friends and priests such as Ines de la Asuncion began to circulate her life story throughout Europe with hopes of beginning the beatification process for Carvajal. However, there has been some controversy regarding Carvajal's death. Since Carvajal died from a respiratory illness, rather being executed for her faith, this disqualifies her from being considered a martyr.

After Carvajal took her vow of poverty, she stated that she wanted to have her remains lie in a Jesuit church or college, however, Carvajal's will went unfulfilled as her wishes were not met. The Spanish ambassador Diego Sarmiento de Acuña, was ordered by King Phillip III to send her remains to Madrid, where they lie in the Royal Monastery of la Encarnación to this day.

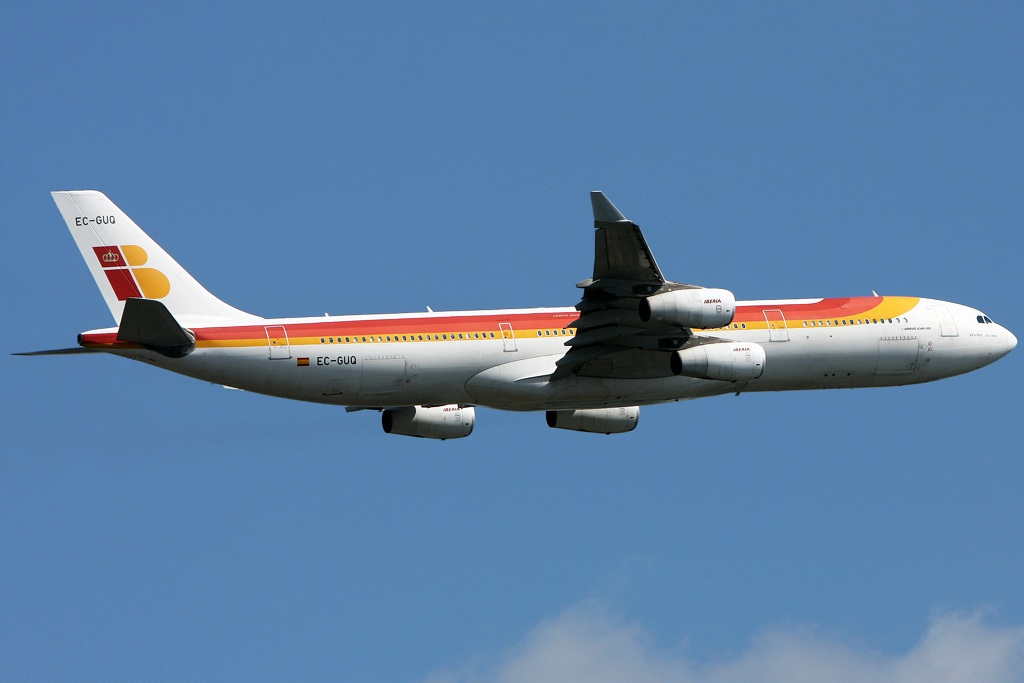
Iberia Airbus A340-313X in Mexico City named after Carvajal in 1990

The Iberian Airbus A340-313X located in Mexico City was named after Carvajal y Mendoza in 1990.
