= Sisters of the Cross and Passion =

Roman Catholic religious congregation

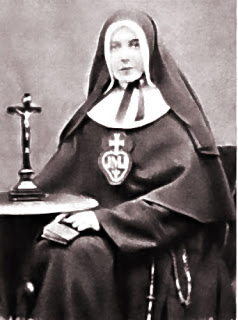
Elizabeth Prout

Sisters of the Cross and Passion, Latin Congregatio Sororum SS. Crucis et Passionis D.N.I.C., also known as the Passionist Sisters, is a Catholic religious congregation founded in 19th-century Manchester, England, by Elizabeth Prout, later called Mother Mary Joseph. It is part of the larger Passionist movement.

== History ==
The Sisters of the Cross and Passion of our Lord Jesus Christ was founded in Manchester, England during the 19th century, by Elizabeth Prout (known in religion as Mother Mary Joseph). She was a convert to Catholicism at the time the first Passionist missionaries arrived in England.

Elizabeth Prout worked among the poor mill workers of Manchester and gathered together a group of dedicated women to serve their needs, both educational and spiritual. This was the beginning of the Sisters of the Cross and Passion. The first sisters made their vows in November 1852. Prout's approach was unique for her time, in that her institute did not have specific educational requirements nor dowries. Membership was therefore open to the poor that the community served. Individual talents determined what tasks were assigned. Clementina Stuart (1830–94), the youngest daughter of Charles Edward Stuart or Charles Manning Allen (1802–80), the younger of the Sobieski Stuart brothers, became a nun in the Order and worked abroad for many years.

In the early days they lived in the mill towns of England and Scotland, worked in schools for poor children, taught young working class women good housekeeping, and sheltered them in hostels. In time the Sisters of the Cross and Passion became best known for their many schools and colleges.

== Ministries ==
The Sisters of the Cross and Passion are an international congregation. The largest part of the Congregation is in the Province of St. Paul of the Cross which covers Great Britain and Ireland, and operates two hospice centers for the terminally ill in Bosnia. The United States province has houses in Connecticut and Rhode Island, New York, New Jersey, Tennessee and Jamaica, West Indies. Other provinces are in South America, in Chile, Argentina and Peru. There are also sisters working in Australia, and Papua New Guinea. The sisters in Botswana work with people living with HIV/AIDS and offer HIV preventative education.

Sisters are involved in education, parish work, retreat work, and pastoral care. They run retreat houses in Connecticut (US), in Larne, Northern Ireland and in Ilkley, England
