= Dominic Barberi =

Italian Passionist priest

Blessed Dominic Barberi CP
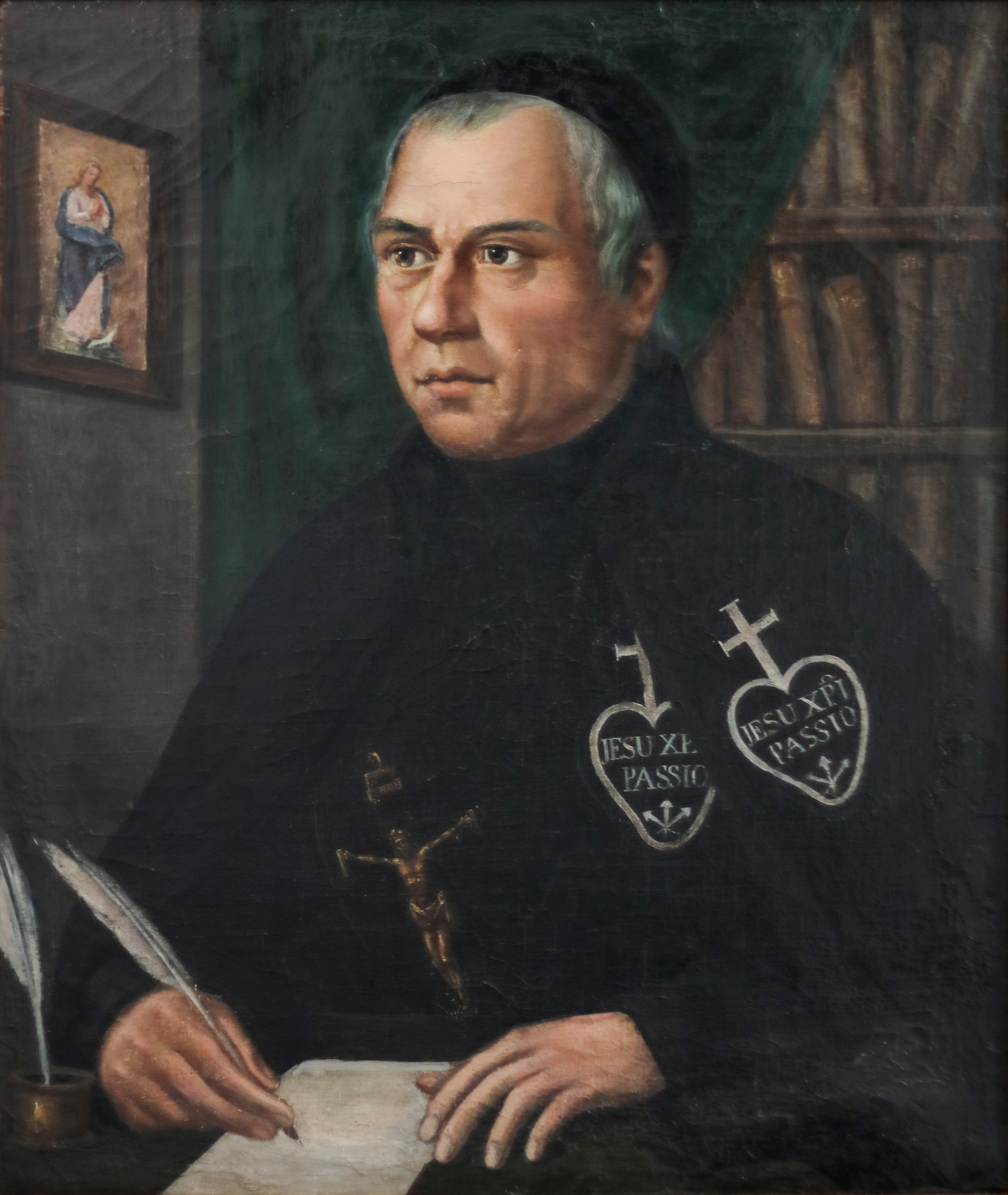
- Born: 22 June 1792; Viterbo, Papal States
- Died: 27 August 1849 (aged 57); Reading, Berkshire, England
- Venerated in: Roman Catholic Church
- Beatified: 27 October 1963, Rome, Italy by Pope Paul VI
- Major shrine: Church of Saint Anne and Blessed Dominic, St Helens, Merseyside, England
- Feast: 26 August

Dominic Barberi, CP (22 June 1792 – 27 August 1849) was an Italian Passionist priest who was prominent in spreading Catholicism in England in the 19th century, including to John Henry Newman and many other Anglicans. In 1963, Barberi was beatified by Pope Paul VI.

== Birth and early life ==
Barberi was born Dominic Giovanni Barberi near Viterbo to a poor family of Italian farmers in 1792. His parents died in his early childhood, and Barberi was raised by his maternal uncle, Bartolomeo Pacelli. As a boy, Barberi was employed to take care of sheep. An elderly Capuchin taught him to read. Although he read all the books he could obtain, he had no regular education.

When Napoleon suppressed the religious communities in the Papal States, Barberi became acquainted with several Passionists living in exile near his town. Barberi befriended these Passionists and served daily Mass with them.

When Barberi was one of the few men in his locality not chosen for military conscription, he felt it was a sign from God that he should enter a religious community. Barberi believed that he was called to preach the Gospel in far-off lands. He would later affirm that he had received a specific call to preach to the people of England. Paul of the Cross, the founder of the Passionists, also had great enthusiasm for converting England.

== Passionists ==
Barberi was received into the Passionists in 1814 after the re-establishment of the religious orders in the Papal States. Initially, Barberi served as a lay brother, but once his extraordinary gifts were revealed, his status was changed to that of a clerical novice, in an extraordinary break with custom. During his studies, Barberi's brilliance was an example to his fellow students, although he would often take steps to play down his intelligence. Barberi was ordained a priest on 1 March 1818.

After completing the regular course of studies, Barberi taught philosophy and theology to the students of the congregation as a lector for a period of 10 years, first in Sant'Angelo and then in Rome. He lived at the Monastery of Ss. John and Paul on the Caelian Hill. During this period, he produced many theological and philosophical works. In the summer of 1830, he was asked to aid an English convert to Catholicism, Sir Henry Trelawney, with regard to the rubrics of the Mass. Through this meeting, Barberi made the acquaintance of Ignatius Spencer and influential English Catholics such as Ambrose Phillipps. This was to be the first step in a journey which would eventually bring Barberi to England. Through his continued correspondence with these persons, Barberi's hopes for England's conversion were kept alive.

Barberi at that time held in Italy the offices of rector, provincial consultor, and provincial, and fulfilled the duties of these positions with ability. At the same time, he constantly gave missions and retreats, always mindful of his hopes to travel and preach in England. In 1830, when he was 38, Barberi was chosen to establish a new monastery at Lucca. In 1839, the Passionist general chapter met and discussed the possibility of making a foundation in England. Finally, in January 1840, negotiations were completed with regard to a Passionist foundation at Ere, near Tournai, in Belgium. The superiors, mindful of Barberi's singular vocation to England, in spite of his age and ill health, sent Barberi to be superior of the Belgian mission.

== Foundations in Belgium and England ==
The first Passionist Retreat in Belgium was founded at Ere in June 1840. On arrival in Belgium, the local bishop was so unimpressed with Barberi's plebeian appearance that he was subjected to intense examination in moral theology before being allowed to hear confessions. Life in Belgium posed plenty of problems for the Passionists; one of the brothers had fallen ill, the community was in abject poverty, and Barberi had few words of French. Barberi's spirit rose to the occasion, and soon the community was flourishing, and even Barberi enjoyed good health.

In September, Barberi received a letter from Bishop Wiseman, the head of the English mission, inviting Barberi to start a Passionist foundation in England at Aston Hall. Barberi, with the permission of the Passionist General, visited the site in November 1840, though Ignatius Spencer warned Barberi that the situation in England would mean this would not be a favourable time to make such a foundation. Barberi set out for England once more in October 1841, where he was greeted with stares and suspicion, not only as a Catholic priest, but for the strange garb of the Passionist habit. J. Brodrick SJ, in his work on the "Second Spring" of Catholicism in England, says of Barberi's arrival, "The second spring did not begin when Newman was converted nor when the hierarchy was restored. It began on a bleak October day of 1841, when a little Italian priest in comical attire shuffled down a ship's gangway at Folkestone."

After many months of waiting at Oscott College, Barberi finally secured possession of Aston Hall in Staffordshire in February 1842, after 28 years of effort, thereby establishing the Passionists in England. The initial reception of Barberi and his fellow Passionists was less than welcoming. Local Catholics feared that the arrival of these newcomers would cause renewed persecutions. Barberi was also met with ridicule: his attempts to read prayers in English were met with the laughter of his congregation. However, the community increased in numbers. As the people of Aston grew to know Barberi, they became enamoured of him, and Barberi soon began to receive a steady stream of converts. A centre was also set up in neighbouring Stone, where Barberi would also say Mass and preach to the local populace.

Opposition to Barberi was also present in Stone, where on his journeys to the Mass centre, local youths would throw stones at him, though two youths took the decision to become Catholics when they were greatly edified to see Barberi kiss each stone that hit him and place it in his pocket. During many of these frequent attacks, Barberi barely escaped death. Local Protestant ministers often held anti-Catholic lectures and sermons to ward the people away from Barberi and the Catholics. Wilson records how one of these ministers followed Barberi along a street shouting out various arguments against transubstantiation, Barberi was silent, but as the man was about to turn off, Barberi retorted: "Jesus Christ said over the consecrated elements, "This is my body." You say, "No. It is not his body!" Who then am I to believe? I prefer to believe Jesus Christ."

Converts increased at Stone, so much so that a new church had to be built. It was at Aston, however, that on 10 June 1844 the first Corpus Christi procession was held in the British Isles, an event which attracted thousands of Catholics and Protestants alike. Barberi then began to visit other parishes and religious communities in order to preach, such "missions", as they were called, causing Barberi's reputation to become widely known. They frequently took place in the industrial cities of northern England, such as Manchester, Liverpool and Birmingham.

== Newman's conversion ==
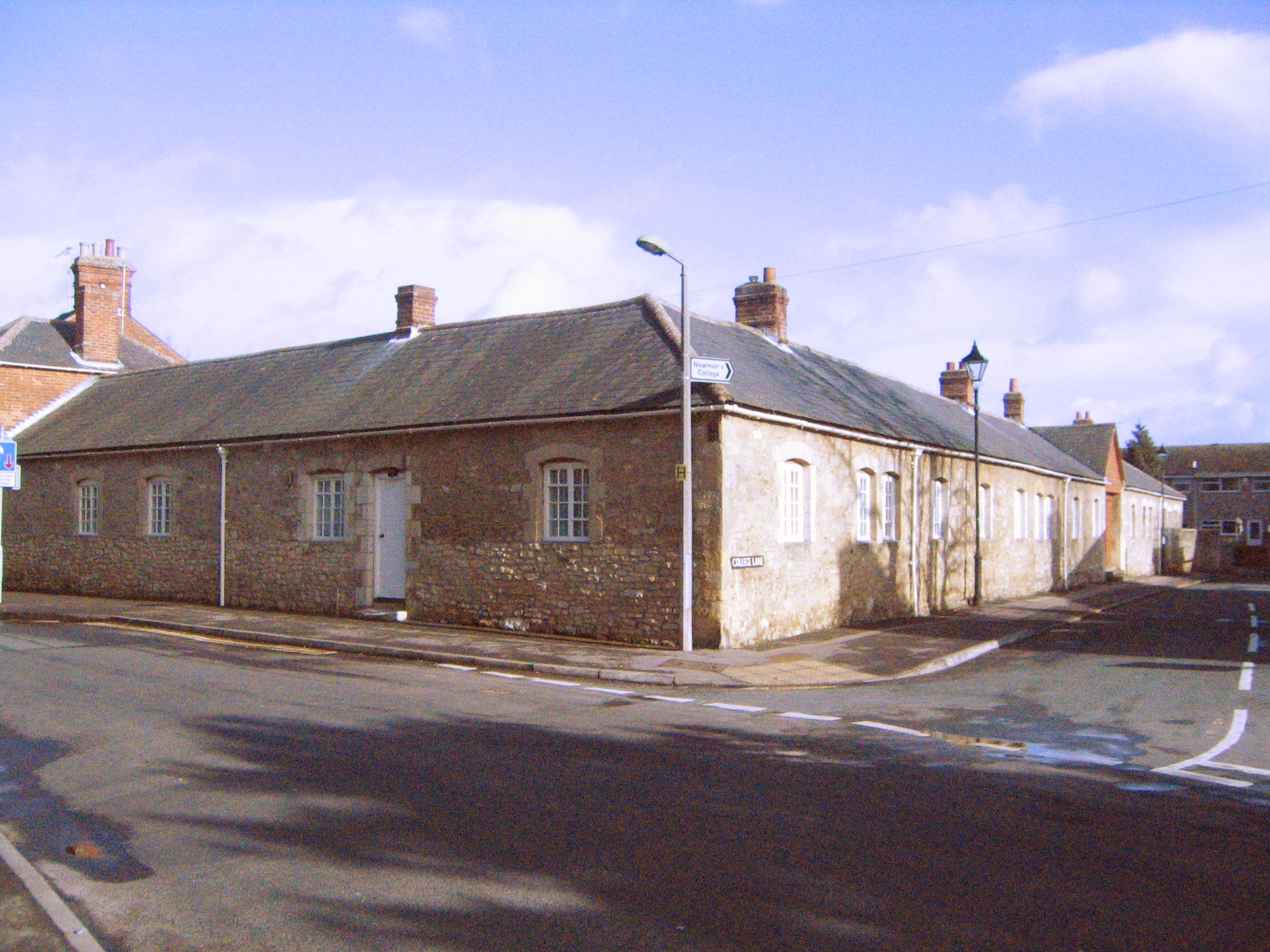
The college, Littlemore where Barberi received Newman into the Church

While in Italy and later in Belgium, Barberi had always kept up a keen interest in the Oxford Movement. In 1841 a letter by John Dobree Dalgairns appeared in L'Univers explaining the position of the Anglican High Church party. Barberi decided to respond to this letter in the mistaken belief that it represented the views of the entire faculty of Oxford University. (Dalgairns was an undergraduate when he wrote the letter.) Barberi's "Letter to University Professors at Oxford" describes his long hopes for the conversion of England and his belief that the men of Oxford would be instrumental in such a conversion. The letter, through the help of Ignatius Spencer, eventually ended up in the hands of Dalgairns, who was residing with John Henry Newman at Littlemore. Barberi repudiated the Anglican claim that the 39 Articles could be interpreted in a Catholic light. In their continued correspondence, Dalgairns and Barberi debated the Catholic position, and Dalgairns requested copies of the Passionist Rule and Dominic's 'The Lament of England'. Eventually, Dalgairns was received into the Catholic Church by Barberi at Aston in September 1845.

In October of that same year Barberi visited Littlemore, where Newman made his confession to him. Newman relates in his "Apologia" how Barberi arrived soaked from the rain and as was drying himself by the fire when Newman knelt and asked to be received into the Catholic Church. This event is marked by a sculpture in the Catholic Church of Blessed Dominic Barberi at Littlemore. Two of Newman's companions at Littlemore were also received, and Barberi celebrated Mass for them the following morning.

== Further work and death ==
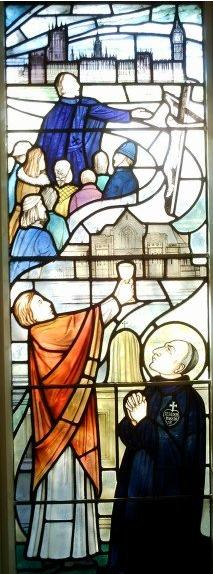
Window from Blessed Dominic's Shrine

The community at Aston had gained 15 religious members. In 1846, a new foundation was made at Woodchester in Gloucestershire and in 1848, the Passionists arrived in London. In the last years of his life, Barberi engaged in negotiations for the foundation of St Anne's Retreat, Sutton, where today he lies buried. In 1847, George Spencer, Barberi's longstanding friend, was received into the Congregation of the Passion. Throughout this time, Barberi fulfilled his duties in preaching missions and heading the English and Belgian foundations.

One story told of Barberi during this time exemplifies a sense of humour. While he was visiting a convent of nuns who were instructing many converts, some of them male, Barberi was informed that some of the sisters were worried about teaching men. Barberi retorted, "Have no fear, Sisters. You are all too old and too ugly." The Sisters appreciated Barberi's humour so much that they recorded the incident in their archives.

Such work inevitably took its toll upon Barberi's health, and from 1847 he insisted that his life had nearly run its course. He had preached numerous retreats, both alone and with Spencer, both in England and Ireland. On 27 August 1849, Barberi was travelling from Paddington, London to Woodchester, when at Pangbourne he suffered a heart attack. Because in London "the cholera was then prevalent", there were no hotels that would take him in, and so it was decided to bring him back to Reading (to the Railway Tavern, later the Duke of Edinburgh Hotel, now demolished). The up-train arrived more than an hour later, while "he remained in great agony but in peace and with 'Thy will be done' ever on his lips".

Barberi is buried in St. Anne and Blessed Dominic Church, Sutton, Merseyside, which is also the shrine of Elizabeth Prout and Ignatius Spencer. During the Mass celebrated at the "Blessed Dominic shrine Church of St Anne and Blessed Dominic" two months before the 50th anniversary of the beatification, Archbishop Bernard Longley explained why he believed "Blessed Dominic" was an ideal patron for the Year of Faith, which ran until 24 November. Barberi was also claimed patron of the Year of Faith for the Archdiocese of Birmingham.

== Beatification and legacy ==
Barberi's spiritual writings were approved by theologians on 12 April 1905 and 20 November 1940. His beatification cause was formally opened on 14 June 1911, granting Barberi the title of Servant of God. He was declared venerable by Pope Pius XI on 16 May 1937. Barberi was beatified by Pope Paul VI in 1963, during the Second Vatican Council.

Barberi is best remembered for his part in Newman's conversion, but is also commemorated for his work in the efforts to return England to the Catholic faith in the 19th century. In his years in England, Barberi established three churches and several chapels, preached innumerable missions and received hundreds of converts, not only Newman, but others such as Spencer and Dalgairns.

Barberi is commemorated in the dedication of the Roman Catholic church in Wokingham Road, Earley to Our Lady of Peace and Blessed Dominic Barberi. The former Parish of Blessed Dominic Barberi, which existed briefly in Lower Earley, had been put under his patronage.

A relic of Barberi was given to Monsignor Keith Newton, Ordinary of the Personal Ordinariate of Our Lady of Walsingham, for the ordinariate to be kept at Our Lady of the Assumption Church, Warwick Street.

== Literary works ==
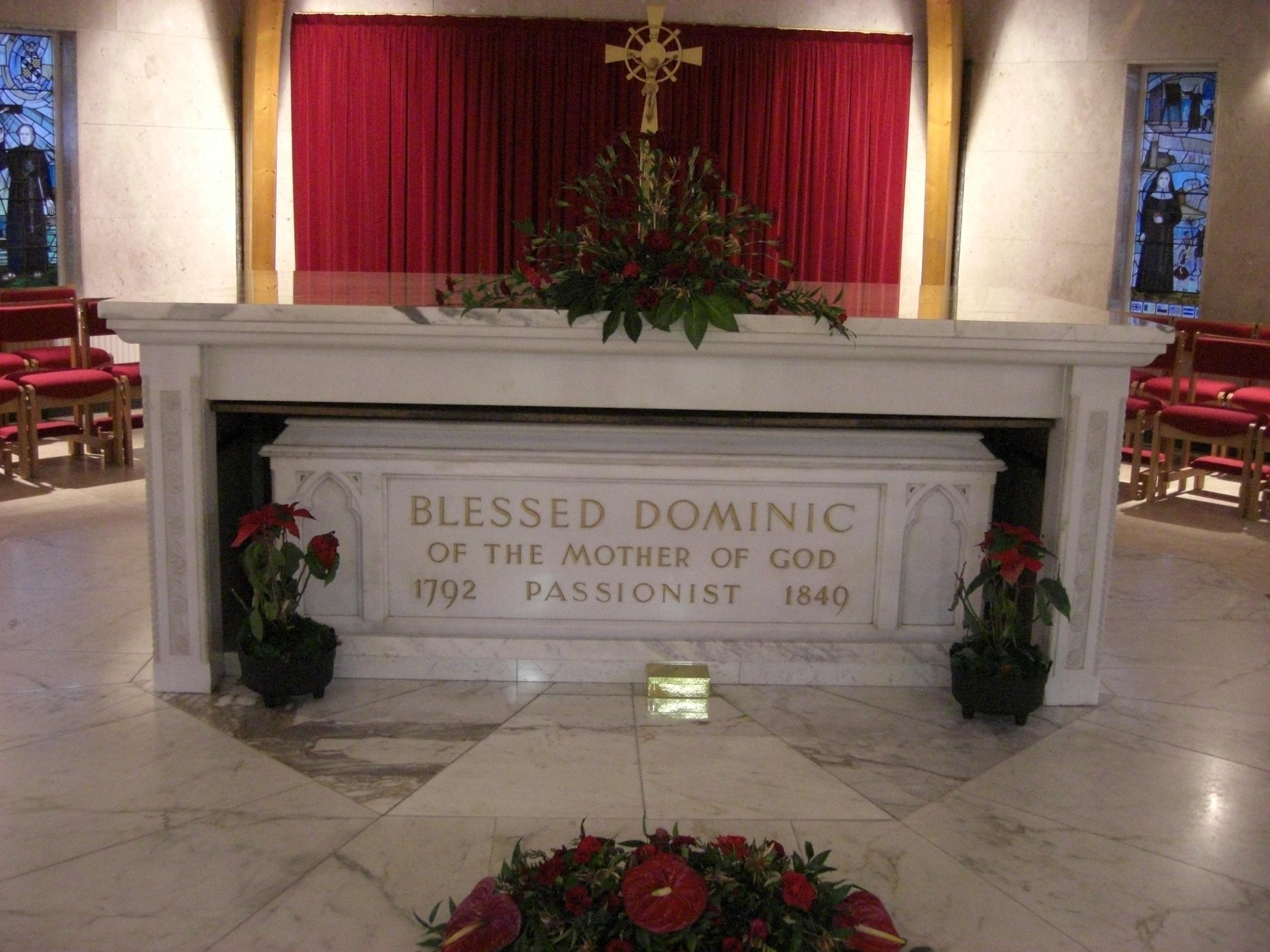
The shrine of Blessed Dominic Barberi

Among Barberi's works are courses of philosophy and moral theology; a volume on the Passion of Our Lord; a work for nuns on the Sorrows of the Blessed Virgin, "Divina Paraninfa"; a refutation of de Lamennais; three series of sermons; and various controversial and ascetic works. One of Barberi's most famed works was his 'Lamentation of England', in which he used the words of the Prophet Jeremiah to express the lamentations of English Catholics.
