= Elizabeth Prout =

English Catholic, founder of Passionist Sisters (1820–1864)

Venerable Mary Joseph of Jesus CP
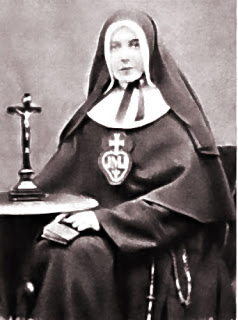
- Born: Elizabeth Prout; 2 September 1820; Coleham, Shrewsbury, England
- Died: 11 January 1864 (aged 43); St Helens, England

Elizabeth Prout, also known as Mother Mary Joseph of Jesus, (2 September 1820 – 11 January 1864) was the founder of the religious congregation of the Sisters of the Cross and Passion.

== Early life ==
Elizabeth Prout was born in Coleham, Shrewsbury, England on 2 September 1820. Little is known of her early life, save that she was born to an Anglican mother and a father who was a lapsed Catholic. Elizabeth was baptised at St Julian's Church, Shrewsbury, and brought up in the Anglican tradition. Her parents, Edward Prout and his wife Ann nee Yates, relocated the family to seek work at Stone, Staffordshire, where her father worked as a journeyman cooper in Joule’s Brewery by 1841. In her early twenties she converted to Catholicism under the influence of the Passionist missionary to England, Dominic Barberi, as well as another Passionist, Father Gaudentius Rossi. Her conversion was met with great negativity by her parents (both of whom were later converted to Catholicism). Prout began to feel a strong attraction to the religious life and Rossi advised her to join the Sisters of the Infant Jesus in Northampton. In 1848 Prout joined this community where she initially found great happiness. Her health however was poor, and the sisters did not think her strong enough for their work. After spending some time with her parents, Prout again appealed to Rossi for advice. At that time the Passionist was giving a parish mission at St Chad’s in Cheetham Hill, Manchester, and it was there that Rossi advised Prout to make her home, teaching in the parish school.

== Work in Manchester ==
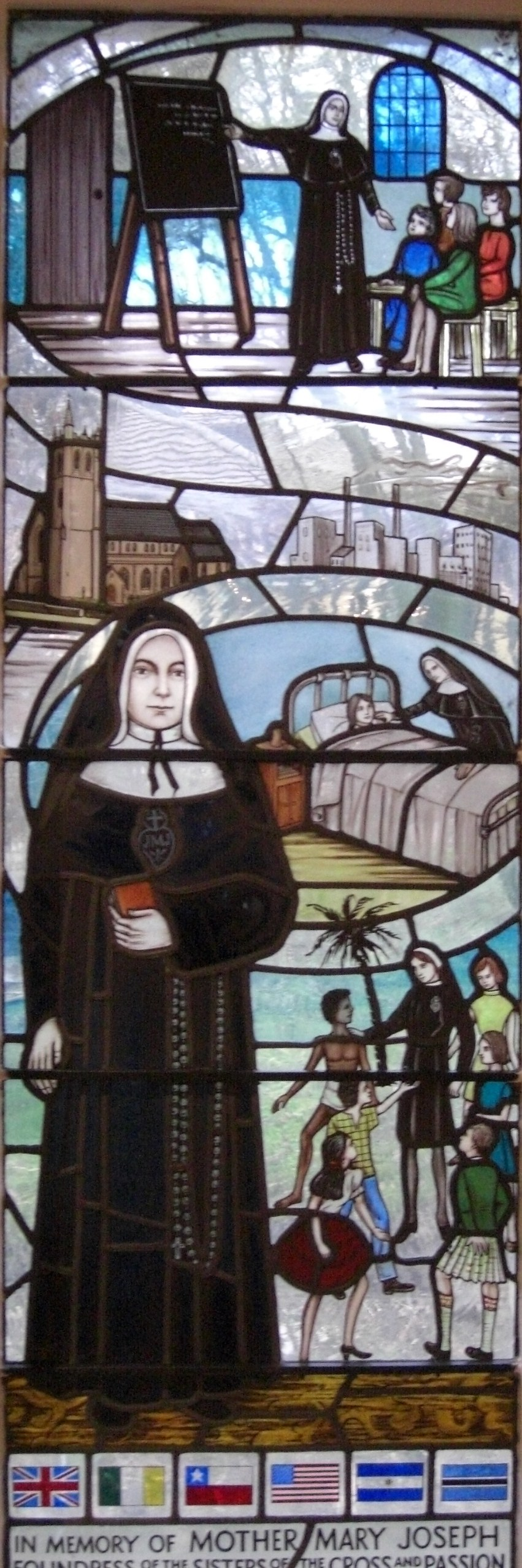

On arriving in Manchester, Prout was met with the squalid conditions that the people lived in. She soon established herself in the parish by visiting the sick and poor in some of the poorest areas of Manchester, teaching workers in the cotton mills and Irish immigrants fleeing the Great Famine.

Touched by the misery and deprivation of the poor, she and a few companions came together to form a community to help the voiceless downtrodden workers in the large industrial towns of nineteenth-century England.

Prout felt that she wanted to establish a more regular life for her and her companions and thought first of joining an existing religious institute, but then, with the advice of Rossi, believed she was called to found a new congregation. A house was secured in Stocks Street, behind St. Chad's church and there Elizabeth and her companions lived and worked, providing educational opportunities and skills for women which would enable them to seek better work.

The life of Prout and her female companions was strict, and they laboured for much of the day in prayer and working for the local poor. The life proved so strict that eventually all of Prout's companions left her. New recruits came and a rule of life was drawn up by Rossi. The company was called the Institute of the Holy Family. Prout and the sisters received a religious habit at the hands of Father Croskell, parish priest of St. Chad's, on the Feast of the Presentation of Mary, 21 November 1852. A plaque in the Lady Chapel of St. Chad's records this event. At her clothing Prout received her new religious name, Mother Mary Joseph of Jesus.

The next two years saw the sisters working unceasingly, to such an extent that their health was neglected and many of the sisters fell ill, being too poor to afford the services of a doctor; Prout was called upon to nurse the sisters herself. In 1855 Prout and another Sister moved to Sutton, St Helens. She opened a school at St Mary’s, Blackbrook, and took charge of St Anne’s School, Sutton. The sisters earned their living as best they could; they knew, like the people around them, what poverty was, and at times Prout was forced to beg.

Encouragement was ever present however, in the form of many benefactors and friends, not least amongst them Father Ignatius Spencer, son of Earl Spencer and convert to the Catholic faith. He too had become a Passionist and joined Father Dominic Barberi in his work in England. When Rossi was transferred to the United States by his superiors Spencer took the place of the spiritual guide of Prout and her Institute. By this time a larger home had been found for the community in Levenshulme on the outskirts of Manchester.

Conflicts within the community had taken their toll on Prout's work, particularly the finances of the Institute. She obtained permission from the bishop to go to Ireland to beg for alms for her Institute and there met with Spencer. On her return from Ireland Prout found the situation even worse than when she had left. People were accusing the sisters of irregularity and so an ecclesiastical investigation began. The result of the investigation was extremely positive and revealed the deep poverty of the sisters and the sacrifices they had made in their hard work.

In all Prout taught at or set up nine schools across the country. Elizabeth Prout died of tuberculosis on 11 January 1864 at the convent, Sutton St. Helens Lancashire. She was 43 years of age. Her body together with that of Dominic Barberi and Ignatius Spencer lies in the shrine of St. Anne’s Church Sutton.

== Passionist Sisters ==
Spencer began to spend much more time with the sisters and as such the influence of Passionist spirituality began to grow within the community. Soon Prout and Spencer were working together on the Rule of the Institute to bring it into conformity with the Rule of the founder of the Passionists, St. Paul of the Cross. Spencer took the Rule to Rome for the Pope's approval, which he received. The Institute was thus formally erected as a religious congregation of the Catholic Church. On 23 October 1863 Prout was elected Mother General, but her health was failing, and she was near total physical collapse. Prout died on 11 January 1864, physically broken by her labours, but with the future of the congregation secure. She was dressed in her habit and buried at the Passionist Church of St. Anne's, in Sutton, St. Helens near Liverpool, where Dominic Barberi and Ignatius Spencer were also buried. Ten years after her death the sisters were given permission to wear the sign of the Passionists on their habit and their name was changed to the "Sisters of the Cross and Passion" thus completing the work of Prout and Spencer.

== Cause for beatification ==
At the end of the 20th century a renewed interest in the life and work of Prout led to the cause for her beatification being opened. Her body was exhumed on 20 June 1973 and on 30 July reburied beside Ignatius Spencer and Dominic Barberi in the new shrine at Sutton. There are two reports from Catholic News Service of miraculous cures attributed to Prout's intercession. These, in addition to her heroic virtue, are being investigated for future beatification. The cures involve a person with cancer and a person with severe brain damage from a skull fracture. Prout was declared venerable in January 2021.
