= Ignatius Spencer =

Anglican convert in the Passionist Order (1799–1864)

Venerable Ignatius of Saint Paul CP
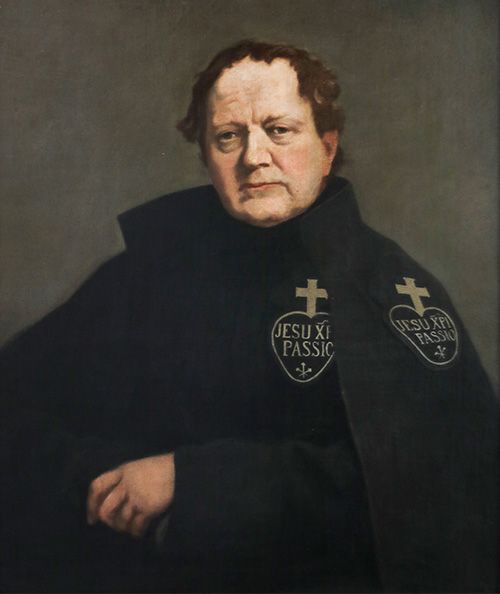
- Born: George Spencer; 21 December 1799; London, England
- Died: 1 October 1864 (aged 64); Carstairs, South Lanarkshire, Scotland

Ignatius of St Paul, C.P. (born George Spencer; 21 December 1799 – 1 October 1864) was an English Catholic priest and nobleman as a son of the 2nd Earl Spencer. He converted from Anglicanism to the Catholicism and entered the Passionists in 1847, spending the rest of his life working for the conversion of England to the Catholic faith. Now a candidate for sainthood, he was declared Venerable by Pope Francis on 20 February 2021.

== Biography ==
=== Early life and education ===
George Spencer was born in Admiralty House, London. He was the son of George Spencer, 2nd Earl Spencer, at that time First Lord of the Admiralty. As a child Spencer lived at the family's seat, Althorp, and was tutored by his governess and his mother. In 1808, at the age of 9, he and his brother, Frederick, went up to Eton College to continue their education. At Eton, Spencer fell under the influence of Richard Godley, a stalwart evangelical Anglican who introduced him to various practices of piety and asceticism. Dissatisfied with the education and evangelical influences of Eton, the Spencers removed him from the school at Christmas 1814. Spencer's education was then continued under the direction of Charles James Blomfield of Buckinghamshire who both provided a more classical education for the boy and prepared him for the rite of confirmation. In October 1817, Spencer went up to Trinity College, Cambridge, where he studied divinity. He spent much of the long vacation of 1818 at Tywyn in Merionethshire with his friend Thomas Fremantle. At Cambridge, Spencer enjoyed the company of a circle of friends who often spent their days in conversation, taking tea and playing cards. Lady Spencer reproved her son for what she took to be wasted time. However, Spencer took a first class honours degree upon going down from Cambridge in 1819. As was expected at the time, Spencer set off for his "Grand Tour" with his parents after leaving university. While Spencer clearly enjoyed the cultural aspects of this tour, he was aghast at his encounter with continental Catholicism.

=== Anglican priest ===
Returning from Europe, Spencer undertook studies to prepare for ordination in the Church of England. As the youngest son of an aristocratic family, this was the expected career path that Spencer would take. He studied the classical languages, as well as employing a Jewish scholar to teach him some Hebrew. Thus on 22 December 1822 Spencer was ordained a deacon. For two years Spencer worked in a Sunday school, but also as a magistrate in Northampton and on 13 June 1824 Spencer was ordained a priest. Thereafter his father presented him with the charge of the parish of Brington. Spencer was totally committed to the care of his parish and spent his days visiting his parishioners, the sick and the dying and was often seen dispensing food, clothes and moneys.

=== Conversion to Catholicism ===
During his time at Brington, Spencer began to ask questions about his Anglican faith and doubts troubled his mind. He explored each and every tradition, from High Church to Evangelical and even in his own parish he met many Methodists and other non-conformists. George's education was highly scriptural, and he struggled to find a basis in scripture for the doctrines contained in the 39 Articles. During a holiday on the Isle of Wight Spencer began to read the writings of the early church Fathers, particularly Chrysostom and Gregory the Great. Through this reading, Spencer gradually began to understand the difference between Catholic and Protestant thought.

From 1827, Spencer began to make the acquaintance of several Catholic priests who encouraged Spencer to continue with his reading. Soon afterward Spencer received the first of three anonymous letters from a correspondent in Lille. The correspondent was aware of Spencer's troubles and suggested he give further thought to Catholicism. Finally, a meeting with Ambrose Phillipps de Lisle, a recent English convert to Catholicism, set Spencer on the road to conversion. After several encounters with de Lisle and a number of priests, Spencer resigned his living of Brington, and on 30 January 1830 George Spencer was received into the Catholic Church.

To remove himself from the public eye and to lessen the blow to his parents, Spencer went to Rome to study at the Venerable English College. Here he came into contact with Nicholas Wiseman, later Cardinal, who tutored him on matters of Catholic tradition. Whilst in Rome Spencer also met Dominic Barberi, a Passionist priest with enthusiasm for the conversion of England to the Catholic faith. Barberi would later have a great part to play in Spencer's life. During his studies at Rome, George wrote an account of his conversion from the Protestant to the Catholic faith that was published in the Catholic journals, and finally he was ordained a deacon in January 1832, and on the feast of St. Augustine of Canterbury, 28 May of that same year, he was ordained a priest.

=== Crusade of prayer for England ===
In August 1832 Spencer returned to England to act as a curate to a church in Walsall where he was given particular care of a chapel in West Bromwich. Here he opened three schools, gave lectures on religion and made many converts, as well as his usual activities in the parish. Spencer's reputation as a preacher began to grow, and soon he was preaching as far afield as St. Chad's, Manchester, and St. Mary's, Derby. During a visit to France in 1838, Spencer proposed a Crusade of Prayer for the Conversion of England to Hyacinthe-Louis de Quélen, the Archbishop of Paris. Many of Spencer's influential friends joined this campaign, and news of it spread throughout Britain and the Empire. In May 1839, he was appointed spiritual director to the seminarians at Oscott College and in the same month preached at St. Chad's, Manchester on The Great Importance of a Reunion Between the Catholics and the Protestants of England and the Method of Effecting It. In January 1840, Spencer visited John Henry Newman at Oriel College, Oxford to ask Newman to join him in prayer for "unity in truth". Newman sent Spencer away and refused even to see him, but later apologised for this in his Apologia:

"This feeling led me into the excess of being very rude to that zealous and most charitable man, Mr. Spencer, when he came to Oxford in January, 1840, to get Anglicans to set about praying for Unity. I myself then, or soon after, drew up such prayers; it was one of the first thoughts which came upon me after my shock, but I was too much annoyed with the political action of the members of the Roman Church in England to wish to have anything to do with them personally. So glad in my heart was I to see him when he came to my rooms, whither Mr. Palmer of Magdalen brought him, that I could have laughed for joy; I think I did; but I was very rude to him, I would not meet him at dinner, and that, (though I did not say so,) because I considered him " in loco apostatx " from the Anglican Church, and I hereby beg his pardon for it."

Spencer's 'Crusade' did not only meet with Newman's opposition, but within the Catholic Church in England, where Dr Baines used a pastoral letter to reprimand the activities of 'certain converts'. Whilst Spencer limited his activities for a time, he was soon back at work. In July 1842 he set off on a preaching tour of Ireland to beg the prayers of the Irish for their English brethren. Spencer was also greatly pleased to receive the blessing of Pope Pius IX, who granted a number of indulgences for those who would pray for England. Spencer's Crusade was the first association with the unity of Christians as its aim and it is with this in mind that he is often hailed as the Apostle of Ecumenical Prayer.

=== Passionist priest ===
Spencer had often considered the possibility that he might have a vocation to enter the religious life and in 1846 he made a long retreat, finally deciding that it was God's will that he should enter the Passionist Congregation. On 5 January 1847 George Spencer received the Passionist habit from the hands of his old friend Dominic Barberi, who had brought the congregation to England in 1841 with the help of Spencer. Spencer received the religious name Ignatius of Saint Paul, the name he would be known by ever after. Spencer threw himself into Passionist life and after making his religious vows in 1848 began preaching sermons throughout Britain and Ireland, always calling for prayers for the conversion of England. In August 1849, Spencer was preaching in Belgium when he heard of Barberi's death, consequently, he was now provincial of the Passionist Congregation in England and Belgium. In 1851, Spencer set out to Rome to gain the approval of the pope for his work; on his return he also met with several prominent bishops, as well as with Emperor Franz Josef of Austria.

=== Death ===
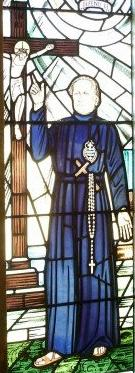
Window depicting Fr Ignatius, from his shrine

Spencer's health had always been precarious at best, and, worn out with continual work, preaching and begging, he suffered a heart attack and died alone in a ditch (the death he had often described as ideal for himself) on 1 October 1864. Spencer was returning from giving a mission in Scotland at the end of September 1864. He stopped at Carstairs to visit an old friend. Leaving his luggage at the station, he walked down the road through the countryside towards the house, and collapsed and died.

He was buried alongside Dominic Barberi and Elizabeth Prout in St. Anne's, Sutton, St. Helens on 4 October and now rests in the shrine church there. When his body was exhumed in 1973 it was noted that Spencer suffered from horrific arthritis, but that his tongue had not suffered any decay since the day of his death.

== Beatification process ==
In March 2007, the Catholic Church announced that the first stage of Spencer's cause for beatification had been completed and that all the necessary documents had been forwarded to Rome. The next step in this process would be a declaration from the Holy See that Spencer could be styled 'Venerable'; on 6 December 2010, the BBC reported that the Vatican had concluded that he had lived a life of heroic virtue, opening the way to such a declaration. Spencer was formally declared venerable by Pope Francis on 20 February 2021.

== Writings ==
- Short Account of the Conversion of the Hon. And Rev. G. Spencer to the Catholic Faith, written by himself, in the English College, at Rome, in the year 1831
- Letters in Defence of Various Points of the Catholic Faith, 1836
- A Return to the Primitive Order of the Church, 1839
- An Account of the Life of C. R. Pakenham, 1857
- Life of Blessed Paul of the Cross, trans., 1860
- The Christian Armed, 1865
