= Mary Vincent Conway =

Irish religious sister and educator

Mary Vincent Conway (c. 18 June 1815 – 27 May 1892) was a sister of charity and educator.

Baptised Honoria, she was the daughter of Michael Conway and Eleanor McCarthy, her father serving with the militia during the Napoleonic Wars. She was born at Dover Castle, England. The family, of modest means, resettled in Ballinasloe, County Galway, where Honoria and her two siblings were taught in a private Catholic school.

Two of her maternal uncles, James and Charles McCarthy, settled in Digby County, Nova Scotia. In 1831 Margaret Conway, Honoria's elder sister, married widower Hugh Donnelly of Athlone, a wool draper. In 1833 he went to Saint John, New Brunswick, where he became successful enough in business that he brought out his family in 1837, Honoria and her widowed mother being part of the household.

Due to a reversal in business, Donnelly retired in 1838 and relocated to Nova Scotia. Honoria and her mother resided at Salmon River, near Meteghan, with Charles McCarthy, where Mrs. Conway died in 1845. The Donnelly's moved to Rhode Island in 1848. It is thought that during these years "she became involved in the efforts of Catholic charitable groups to address the needs of an expanding Irish population."

In 1854 she took vows as a sister of charity in New York, taking the name Mary Vincent. She was one of four volunteers who travelled to Saint John - under the direction of Bishop Thomas Louis Connolly - and was appointed mother general.

The Dictionary of Canadian Biography states:

Recruits to the new community came gradually and steadily during the first years. They were largely of Irish descent. Honoria Conway, now Mother Mary Vincent, had the pivotal and dual challenge of evolving mechanisms by which a religious could develop according to the rules while meeting the immediate need of running an orphanage and setting up schools. The rudiments of an orphanage were already in place when the sisters assumed responsibility for its operation. The establishing of the schools, however, followed the pattern the core personnel had observed in New York. Thus, in 1854 the sisters opened the first free school in Saint John for the daughters of poor Irish immigrants, and in 1858 an institute requiring fees, St Vincent’s Select School for Girls, was founded. It was hoped that the tuition-based institution would finance the free one. By 1859 there were 27 sisters operating five schools – two in Saint John, one in nearby Portland, one in Fredericton, and one in the Acadian parish of Saint-Basile-de-Madawaska, which enjoyed success even though it was conducted in English.
