= Clare Crockett =

Catholic religious sister and former actress (1982–2016)

Servant of God Clare Crockett SHM
- Church: Roman Catholic

Personal details
- Born: Clare Theresa Crockett; 14 November 1982 Derry, Northern Ireland
- Died: 16 April 2016 (aged 33) Playa Prieta, Ecuador
- Buried: Derry City Cemetery
- Profession: Religious sister (Catholic)
- Motto: All or Nothing

Clare Crockett, SHM, religious name Clare Maria of the Trinity and the Heart of Mary, (14 November 1982 – 16 April 2016) was an Irish Catholic religious sister and former actress from Northern Ireland.

== Early life ==
Clare Theresa Crockett was born on 14 November 1982 in Derry, Northern Ireland. As a child she enjoyed acting and spending time with friends. At secondary school Crockett developed a strong interest in literature and theatre, and was regarded as a lively pupil who often played the class clown. At 14 she joined an acting agency and secured her first role the following year. Crockett subsequently worked as a theatre actor, writer and director, and also presented programmes for Channel 4. An offer from Nickelodeon was declined. During her teenage years Crockett described herself as a "wild child", enjoying parties and socialising. From an early age she aspired to be an actress, and in 2002 appeared in a small role in Sunday, a film about the events of Bloody Sunday in Derry in 1972.

== Call to religious life ==
After a religious experience in Spain on Good Friday 2000, Crockett felt called to religious life. In the months that followed she received confirmation of this call, including from a priest at World Youth Day 2000 who recounted surprising details of her childhood. During her final school year Crockett struggled between her worldly ambitions and her sense of vocation, with the former appearing to prevail. Further religious experiences and the persistent conviction of having a call ultimately persuaded her. In summer 2001 she returned to the convent of the Servant Sisters of the Home of the Mother (SHM) in Spain, where she took the name Sister Clare Maria of the Trinity and the Heart of Mary.

== Life as a religious sister ==
Crockett worked in Spain, the United States and Ecuador, undertaking pastoral care, hospital chaplaincy, teaching and missionary outreach. Known for her interpersonal skills, she was much loved by her pupils. As part of this work, Crockett voiced the character of Lucy in the children's series Hi Lucy which aired on EWTN for many years. The programme continued to be broadcast as Lucy and Friends on EWTN'S Europe and Asia-Pacific channels as of May 2023.

== Death and legacy ==
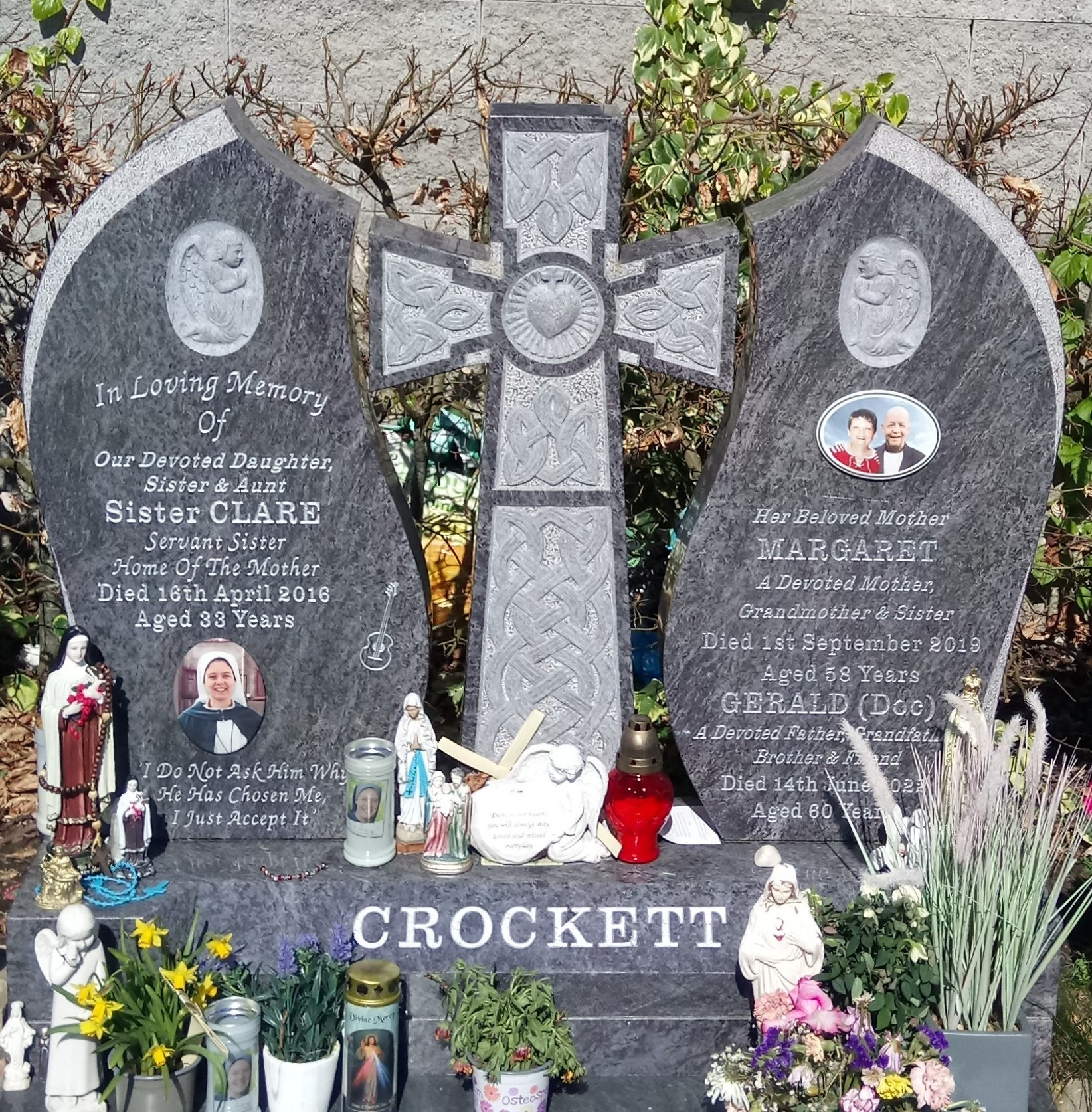
Headstone

On 16 April 2016, while playing the guitar and singing with local young women aspiring to be nuns, the house where Crockett was staying collapsed during the 2016 Ecuador earthquake. She was discovered hours later under the rubble and had died from multiple injuries in Playa Prieta, a community of Riochico, Portoviejo, Ecuador.

Her remains were repatriated two weeks later and buried in the new section of Derry City Cemetery on Lone Moor Road. At the funeral, she was described as an "inspirational example of womanhood".

Crockett's story has been recounted in several formats. The film All or Nothing documents her life. In 2020 a house‑sized mural commemorating her was unveiled near her home in Derry, and a sister from her religious order published a biography.

== Cause for beatification ==
A number of healings and fertility miracles have reputedly been attributed to her by people who prayed for her intercession, and a 2020 article in The Irish Catholic referred to calls for her to be declared a saint. In January 2021 her order said that, while they had begun "to take steps in view of opening the cause" of her beatification, such a step would depend on the local ecclesial authorities in Ecuador, as set out in the Catholic Church's 2007 Sanctorum Mater document. In the same statement, the order described as "fake news" a claim that it would open a cause for beatification in 2021, noting that the beatification process does not begin until at least 5 years after a person's death. The order issued a further clarifying statement in September 2021, noting that while it "truly seems that Our Lord is permitting her to intercede and help people", simply visiting her grave a fixed number of times or asking her for help "is not magical". They said that a request for Sr. Clare's intercession depends on the request, one's faith, and on God's will.

In May 2023, Sr. Kristen Gardner stated that she had been appointed postulator of the cause of beatification of Sr. Clare. She said that the opening of the cause was underway and had been moved to the diocese of Alcalá de Henares in Spain after permission was received from the bishop of Portoviejo, from Rome, and from her local bishop. She said this had been done to make the process easier, since their community is headquartered in Spain, and also because Sr. Clare had lived most of her religious life there.

In 2024, the Catholic Church declared Sister Clare Crockett to be a Servant of God, in what a BBC News article described as the "first step towards being officially recognised as a saint".
