= Jaraicejo =

Jaraicejo, Spain
- municipality
- Flag Coat of arms
- Interactive map of Jaraicejo, Spain
- Coordinates: 39°6′N 5°8′W
- Country: Spain
- Autonomous community: Extremadura
- Province: Cáceres
- Municipality: Jaraicejo

Area
  - Total: 177 km^{2} (68 sq mi)
- Elevation: 506 m (1,660 ft)

Population (2025-01-01)
  - Total: 418
  - Density: 2.36/km^{2} (6.12/sq mi)
- Time zone: UTC+1 (CET)
  - Summer (DST): UTC+2 (CEST)

Jaraicejo (Spanish pronunciation: [xaɾajˈθexo], Extremaduran: Xaraizeju) is a municipality located in the province of Cáceres, Extremadura, Spain. According to the 2005 census (INE), the municipality has a population of 616 inhabitants.

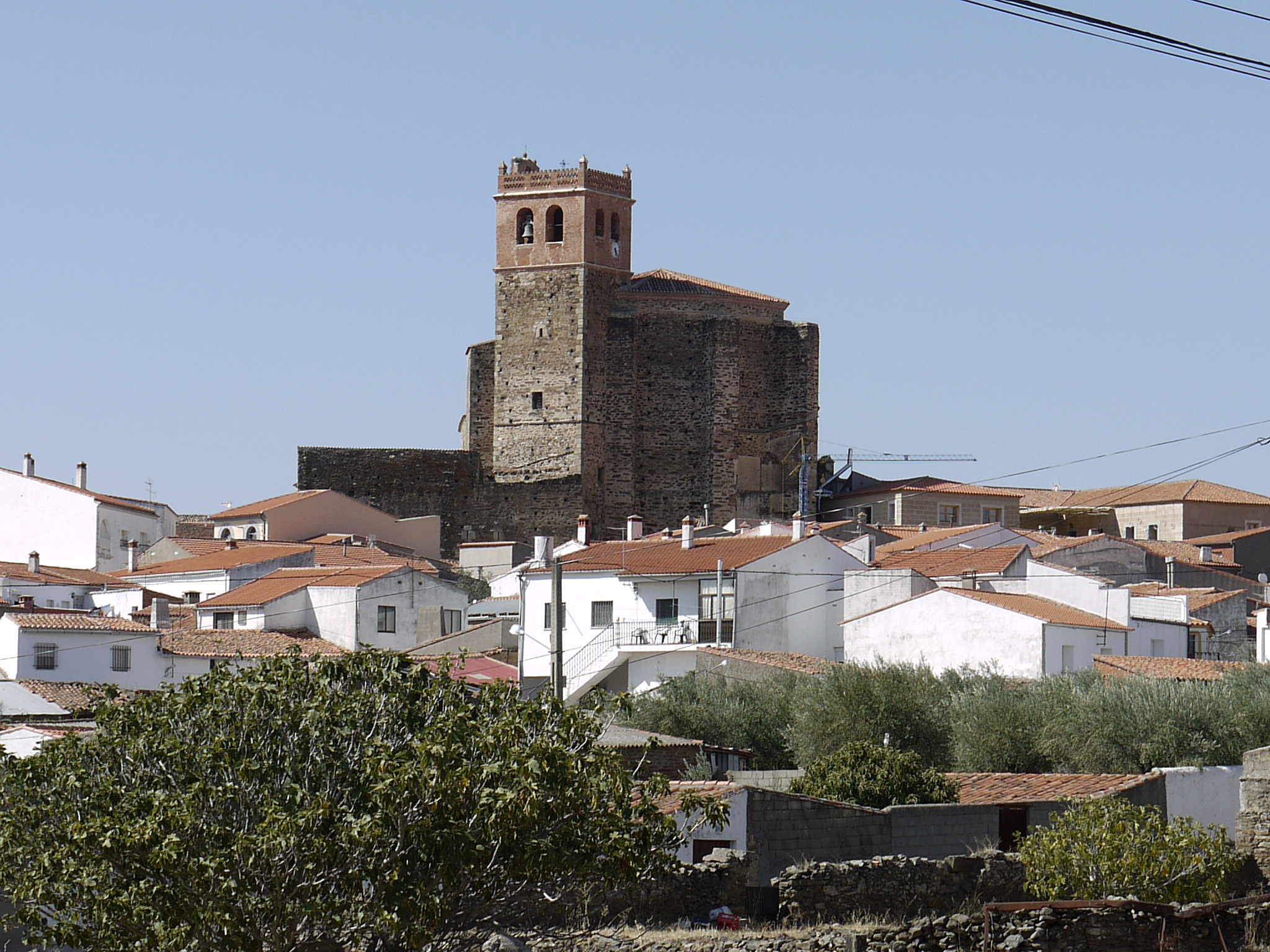
View of Jaraicejo

== See also ==
- List of municipalities in Cáceres
