= Mother Ignatius Hayes =

Mother Mary Ignatius of Jesus O.S.F.
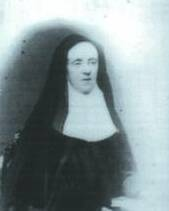
- Photograph of Mother Ignatius Hayes, F.M.I.C., taken in Rome (1889–1894)
- Born: Elizabeth Hayes; 1823; Saint Peter Port, Guernsey
- Died: 6 May 1894 (aged 70–71); Rome, Italy

Mary Ignatius Hayes, O.S.F., also known as Mother Mary Ignatius of Jesus (1823 – 6 May 1894), was an Anglican religious sister who was later received into the Catholic Church and became a Franciscan. Her lifetime of religious service, in the course of which she traveled widely, led to the establishment of three separate religious congregations of Franciscan sisters and the establishment of the Poor Clare nuns in the United States.

== Life ==
=== Early life ===
She was born Elizabeth Hayes in Saint Peter Port, Guernsey. Her father, Philip Hayes, was an Anglican priest from England who was the headmaster of Elizabeth College which prepared boys for matriculation. Her ancestors were very musical and were associated with the work of George Frederick Handel in England. She was the eighth and youngest surviving child of her parents' ten children. Her parents ensured that she received a sound education, was fluent in both French and English and encouraged her love of literature.

After the deaths of both her parents, in the 1840s Hayes moved to England, where she took employment as a teacher in London and Oxford. There she came under the influence of the Oxford Movement and in 1850 became one of the first members of the Anglican Community of St Mary the Virgin and was given the religious name of Sister Mary Ignatius of Jesus. After being a qualified principal and a leader of her community for some years, she was received into the Catholic Church and joined the Franciscan Sisters of the Immaculate Conception and St Francis, who lived in Greenwich and later in Bayswater, under the leadership of Mother Elizabeth Lockhart, who were committed to serving the poor of London. In 1858 she received the religious habit from the future cardinal, Henry Edward Manning, but chose to go to Scotland to do her novitiate under the Tertiary Franciscan Sisters of Glasgow, founded in the mid-15th century, who traced their heritage back to Angela of Foligno. She professed her vows on 26 November 1859. In addition to the traditional three religious vows, she made a fourth vow to dedicate her life to the foreign missions. She wrote in her diary at the time, "God calls me to leave my home and country and to join a foreign mission".

=== Missionary life ===
After her religious profession, Hayes was sent to the island of Jamaica, where she hoped to work to serve the African population who worked the plantations of the British colony. She was deeply disappointed to be assigned to teach the daughters of the colonial plantation owners. She was recalled to Europe, where she soon opened a school in Sèvres, France. Eventually she was allowed to explore her call to serve in the missions.

==== Minnesota ====
Following her sense of vocation, Hayes sought to find where she could best be of service. Receiving an invitation from Thomas Langdon Grace, O.P., the Bishop of St. Paul in Minnesota, she went to a remote section of the United States. She established herself in the village of Belle Prairie in 1872, along with a few companions, where they worked with the children of Canadian immigrants. They became established there as the Missionary Franciscan Sisters of the Immaculate Conception. The following year she opened St. Anthony's Academy for girls, operating out of the log cabin in which she and her companions lived. In 1874, Hayes founded the first Franciscan journal in English, the Annals of Our Lady of the Angels, which continued to be published for the next century.

==== Poor Clare project ====
Hayes hoped to recruit new members from the existing religious communities in Italy, who were anxious about their futures under the Kingdom of Italy after its annexation of the Papal States. Traveling to Rome in 1875, she approached Friar Bernardino da Portoguaro, the Minister General of the Friars Minor, hoping to have some friars sent to her section of Minnesota to serve the vast territory. Additionally, she contacted other communities of Franciscan Sisters, but found no interest in her proposal to serve in America. She then conceived of the advantage of having a contemplative presence as a part of her foundation, which would also have the practical effect of providing a resident priest for their spiritual needs living in such a remote region, with only one priest serving the entire county. She then turned to the Poor Clares, the Franciscan Second Order who are an enclosed religious order, and visited the Monastery of San Lorenzo in Panisperna, an ancient community of the Order. Speaking to the nuns of the community there, she set forth her proposal to provide them a monastery on the grounds of her school. Three of the nuns volunteered to go with her, among whom was Mary Magdalen Bentivoglio, O.S.C.

Hayes wrote to Friar Bernardino, who also had authority over the nuns, as well as various officials of the Vatican whose permission would be needed for such an enterprise. With her persistence, eventually the plan was approved by Pope Pius IX, with Bentivoglio named as the abbess of the new monastery, which was to be the first monastery of the Poor Clares in the United States. Hayes organized the journey of the two nuns who were commissioned for the new foundation, along with a Franciscan friar who was to serve as their spiritual director and chaplain. They set sail from Marseille on 11 September 1875, arriving in New York City the following 12 October, Columbus Day.

Once arrived in New York, however, the friar expressed qualms about proceeding to Minnesota with Hayes, and decided to wait for further instructions from the Minister General. He advised the nuns to do the same. Despite their quandary over this breaking of their commitment to Hayes, the Poor Clares decided to do so until they too received instructions from the Minister General. Bentivoglio later recorded the conversation in which they had to break the bad news to Hayes.

We begged her not to bear us any ill since it was not our fault. Poor Mother Ignatius felt the refusal very much; yet having no binding claim upon us, she resigned herself to the inevitable and departed from us with sorrows and grief in her heart.

==== Georgia ====
Hayes returned to Minnesota without the Poor Clares, but within five years of her original arrival there, the small community had grown to six professed Sisters, and had several candidates in the novitiate Hayes had opened. With her missionary visionary, and her experience in Jamaica, she then turned her focus on serving the African American population of the Southern United States. In the summer of 1879 Hayes led nine other Franciscan Sisters to establish a convent on the Isle of Hope in the State of Georgia, where they taught the children of the recently freed slaves, who were still denied access to education by the institutions of the region, including those of the Catholic Church. The community soon moved to Savannah, where they operated a school under the auspices of William Hickley Gross, C.Ss.R., the Bishop of Savannah.

==== Rome ====
Hayes returned to Rome in 1880, and met with Pope Leo XIII, who suggested that the novitiate of the new congregation be established there, in keeping with its missionary character. Hayes complied with this request, and the candidates for the congregation were then sent there. One of them was Frederica Law, a student at the school in Savannah, who was the first African-American member of the congregation. (Note: Law entered the novitiate in Rome, where she was given the name of Sister Benedict of the Angels. She professed her religious vows at the Porziuncula in Assisi on 19 October 1882. She lived only a year, however, dying on 30 December 1883 in Rome, where she was buried.)

Hayes remained in Italy for her work. Unable to keep in touch with the small community she had left behind in Minnesota, by 1893 she determined to return to the United States to be with them. She left for Naples the following year, intending to set sail for America from there, but took ill. She returned to Rome, where she soon died.

== Legacy ==
The Missionary Franciscan Sisters of the Immaculate Conception established a mission in Egypt in 1898. This was followed by communities in Australia, Bolivia, Canada, Ireland, Papua New Guinea and Peru. In 1964, the Franciscan Sisters of the Immaculate Conception of England, now in Braintree, Essex, which had been Hayes' first religious community as a Roman Catholic, merged with the Missionary Sisters. The united congregation currently number about 250 members.

The community in Belle Prairie struggled on for many years without word from Hayes, until finally word reached them of her death. The Sisters continued to operate the academy until it was burned down under suspicious circumstances in 1889. Having lost everything, the Sisters relocated to Little Falls, Minnesota. From there a number of the Sisters decided to travel to Italy to join the rest of the congregation. Sixteen Sisters chose to remain, and, on 1 March 1891, re-organized themselves as the Franciscan Sisters of the Immaculate Conception of Little Falls, a congregation of diocesan right under the Diocese of Saint Cloud. Currently numbering about 150 Sisters, they primarily serve in Minnesota, but have missions throughout the United States, as well as in Ecuador and Mexico.

In 1893, in answer to request from the people of Rock Island, Illinois, a group of Franciscan Sisters left Little Falls to establish St. Anthony's Hospital there. They soon separated to become an autonomous congregation.
