= Mary Magdalen Bentivoglio =

Italian Poor Clare and foundress

Venerable Mary Magdalen of the Sacred Heart of Jesus OSC
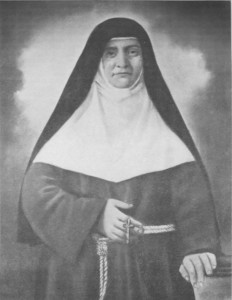
- Born: Anna Maria Bentivoglio; 31 July 1834; Rome, Italy
- Died: 18 August 1905 (aged 81); Evansville, Indiana, United States

Mary Magdalen Bentivoglio, OSC (Italian: Maria Magdalena Bentivoglio, 29 July 1834 – 18 August 1905) was an Italian Poor Clare. She was sent to the United States to found the first convent of the order in the country. She eventually established three of them before her death. Her beatification process has been opened and she has been granted the title of Venerable.

== Life ==
=== Early life ===
She was born Anna Maria Bentivoglio in Rome, the twelfth child of Count Domenico Bentivoglio of Bologna and of Angela Sandreda, an aristocrat of French descent, who called her Annetta. Her father was an officer in the Grande Armée during the Napoleonic Wars who later became a general in the Papal Army and Governor of Rome. As a young girl, she and her older sister Elena were enrolled at the school in the city run by the Society of the Sacred Heart, where another sister, Agata, was a religious sister. When her sister was sent to teach at the Society's school in Turin in 1842, Bentivoglio was transferred to that school, where she studied for the next six years.

Bentivoglio grew up into a beautiful and independent young woman. After the death of her father (1851) and her mother (1860), however, out of regard for the count's service Pope Pius IX took responsibility for her and her two remaining unmarried sisters, Constanza and Matilda, and placed them under the guardianship of Edoardo Cardinal Borromeo, who established the young women in a monastery for the sake of propriety. Drawn to life in an enclosed religious order committed to strict poverty, when her two sisters entered the convent of San Lorenzo in Panisperna, the first Poor Clare monastery in the City of Rome, which followed the Rule of St. Clare as modified by Pope Urban IV, Anna Maria also sought admission. She was received as a postulant on 16 July 1864 and received the religious habit on 4 October 1865, the feast day of St. Francis of Assisi.

=== Foundress in America ===
In 1875, after the Papal States' seizure by the Kingdom of Italy, like other religious communities, the Monastery of San Lorenzo faced closing by the new government. At that same time, Mother Ignatius Hayes, the English foundress of the Franciscan Sisters of the Immaculate Conception in Little Falls, Minnesota, sought to have a contemplative presence as part of her foundation. To this end, she went to Italy to enlist members of the cloistered Franciscan Second Order and approached the ecclesiastical authorities with this proposal. She visited the monastery in Rome, where several nuns volunteered to embark on this new venture. The Minister General of the Friars Minor, Bernardino da Portoguaro, gave his approval to the proposal and sought the permission of the Holy See to allow some nuns of the order to leave their convents to travel to America for this.

Bentivoglio, along with her sister, Constanza, was chosen to go to the United States by Pope Pius IX, who appointed Bentivoglio abbess of the new foundation and Constanza her vicaress, who were to be accompanied by a Franciscan friar, Paulino de Castellaro, who had appointed their spiritual director and chaplain. On 12 August 1875, Castellaro and Hayes went to the monastery to accompany the nuns to the Vatican Palace, where they attended the general audience of Pope Pius and received a special blessing by him. They then traveled to Nice in France, where they met the Minister General. At that point, he gave them formal documents of their commission to the endeavor and transferred the nuns from the Urbanist Observance of the Rule of St. Clare followed by the Monastery of San Lorenzo to that of the Primitive Observance, which followed the unmitigated Rule of St. Clare, and forbade corporate ownership of property by the nuns. They then went to the Poor Clare monastery in Marseille, which followed that form of the Rule of St. Clare, to familiarize themselves with its differences.

==== New York City ====
Hayes booked passage to the United States from there for the group. They boarded the steamer Castalia on 11 September and sailed for New York City. They arrived there on 12 October of that year, Columbus Day. However, once there, Castellaro expressed misgivings in the project and advised the nuns to stay in New York and await further direction from the Minister General rather than proceeding to Minnesota with Hayes. Not knowing what to do, they followed this advice, relying for support on another priest, Isaac Hecker, founder of the Paulist Fathers. This wait lasted until June 1876, when Bernardino instructed them to abandon the plan for Hayes' foundation, as it would have included operating a school for poor girls, contrary to their commitment to the purely contemplative life. He further directed them to try to establish themselves in one of three dioceses in the United States.

Bentivoglio then approached John Cardinal McCloskey, the Archbishop of New York, to see if he would receive them to establish a monastic community in the Archdiocese. The cardinal declined to do so, telling her that an enclosed religious order was not compatible with the American way of life. The next archdiocese on the list, the Cincinnati did the same. In August 1876, the nuns went to Philadelphia, where they met the archbishop, who gave them hospitality in a house he owned, but eventually also declined their request. The two sisters then traveled around the region, seeking a diocese that would accept them. The bishops who they contacted would advise the nuns to switch to forming a community of active Religious Sisters involved in teaching or social service. The Bentivoglio sisters stayed committed to their monastic vocation, however.

==== New Orleans ====
Finally, at the imploring of a woman in New Orleans, who was a member of the Third Order of St. Francis, in December 1876 the Archbishop of New Orleans, Napoléon-Joseph Perché, invited the Bentivoglio sisters to establish their community there. This was their first formal invitation by an American diocese. They arrived in March 1877 and took possession of a cottage in the city. Their first two postulants quickly joined them, and the nuns began to plan the establishment of a monastery.

==== Cleveland ====
This was not to last, however, as the Franciscan Minister Provincial based in St. Louis, who had been delegated authority over the nuns, arrived that July and ordered them to leave New Orleans for Cleveland. The small community moved there in August 1877. Their residence was a converted cigar factory. Additionally, the friar soon advised them that they were to take in a group of Colettine Poor Clares exiled from Germany due to that nation's policy Kulturkampf, closing Catholic institutions. Furthermore, they were to use the German language and, contrary to the mandate of the Minister General, they were to observe the Colettine Rule.

When apprised of the Minister Provincial's insistence on the nun's following the German nuns' practices, in early 1878, they received a letter from him in which he advised them to leave, either returning to New Orleans or starting anew in another location. The Bentivoglio sisters left Cleveland on 27 February, accompanied by the three novices of the community. Upon the initiative of Constanza, they then split up to undertake fundraising and finding a new home.

==== Omaha ====
Constanza Bentivoglio and her companion set out for the West Coast, while Bentivoglio went back to New York City with her companions. In the course of the journey, Constanza met a wealthy Catholic, the philanthropist John A. Creighton, who made an offer to finance the cost of building a monastery there for the nuns. Constanza immediately wrote to Bentivoglio to advise her of this offer, who immediately contacted James O'Connor, the first Bishop of Omaha, whom she knew from their stay in Philadelphia. He officially welcomed the community, though he advised that he could not offer them any financial support. Her small group then traveled from New York to Omaha, where they arrived on 15 August 1878.

The nuns immediately began to organize the fundraising and planning necessary for the building of a monastery. The efforts needed for this were not inconsiderable, as the new building was destroyed by tornadoes twice while still under construction. The struggles succeeded, though, as Pius IX issued a papal bull establishing the convent of the Poor Clares in the United States in Rome on 15 November 1881. The convent then grew to the point where a new foundation was again made in New Orleans in 1885.

Later, after Bentivoglio's return to Omaha, one of the nuns made severe accusations against her and her sister of personal and financial impropriety. They were placed under interdict and were forced to leave the monastery to stay in a convent of the Sisters of Mercy, under whose supervision they lived. They had to undergo several legal proceedings, including one by the Vatican which lasted nearly two years, before they were cleared of all charges.

==== Evansville ====
Bentivoglio made her last foundation in Evansville, Indiana, in 1897, due to a bequest from a relative of one of the nuns. Appointing Constanza as abbess of the Omaha monastery, she led seven other nuns there to found the new monastery, which was dedicated on 12 August of that year, then the feast day of St. Clare. The early years of the community were not easy, as they had to live without any furniture at all, having only the crates in which their belongings had been packed. The nuns in the new community often survived on only bread and water.

Bentivoglio shared this struggle until her death there in 1905. By the year 2000, over 20 Poor Clare monasteries in the United States and Canada traced their origins to Bentivoglio's labors. They had a combined membership of about 350 nuns.

== Veneration ==
Bentivoglio's remains were exhumed in 1907, at which time they were found to be incorrupt. The same was true when they were again exhumed in 1932. This was done due to the acceptance by the Holy See of her beatification for further study.

Her spiritual writings were approved by theologians on 20 November 1940.
