= Colettine Poor Clares =

Reform branch of the Order of St. Clare

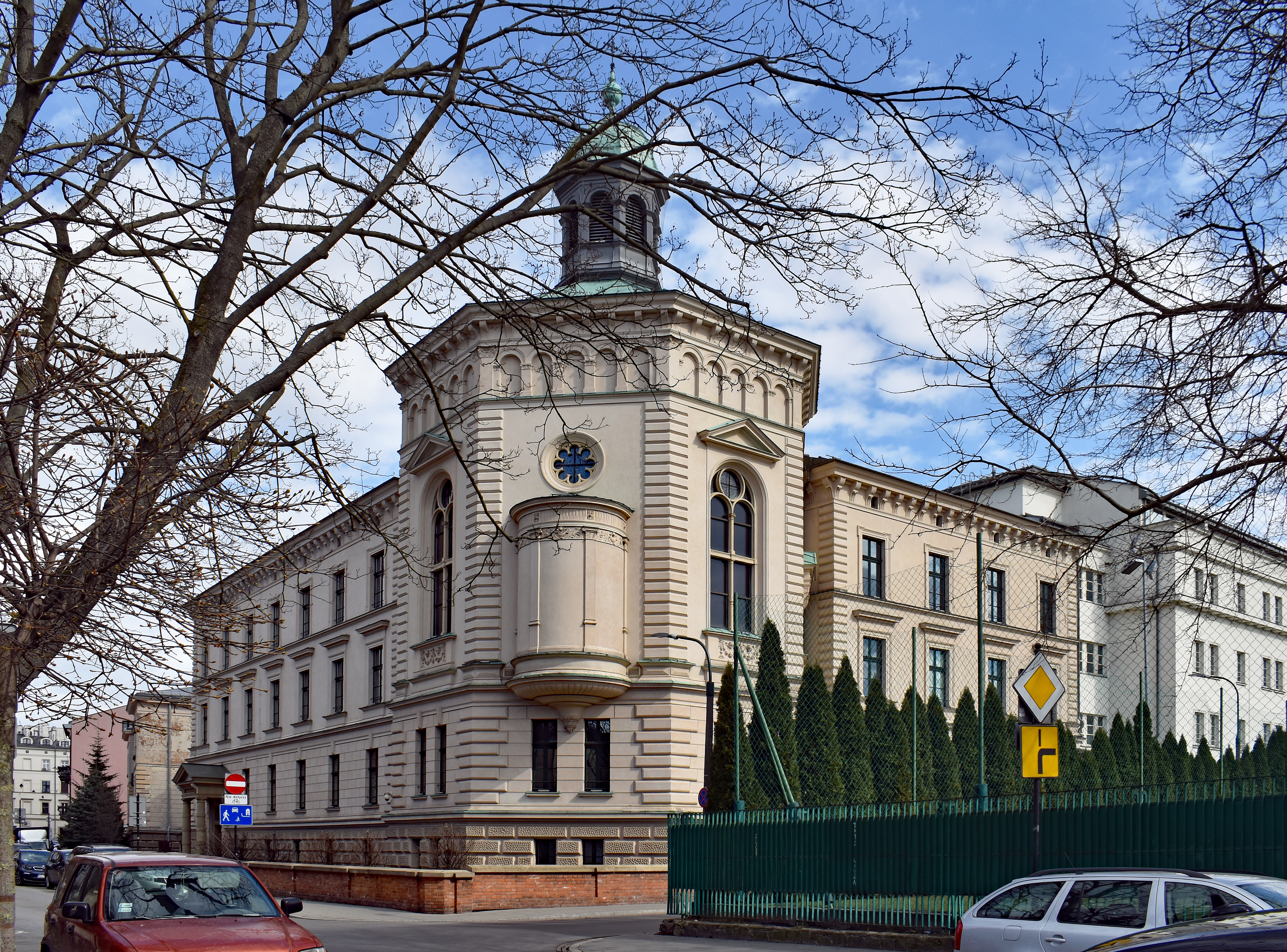
Former Colettine Sisters convent and chapel Poland, Kraków, 12 Koletek Street

The Colettine Poor Clares are a reform branch of the Order of St. Clare, founded by Clare of Assisi in Italy in 1211. They follow the interpretation of the Rule of St. Clare established in 1410 by Saint Colette, originally a French hermit and member of the Third Order of St. Francis.

== History ==
Colette was born in Corbie, a town in the Picardy region of France in January 1381 to an elderly couple. She lost her parents in 1399 and, after a brief stint in a beguinage, in 1402 she received the religious habit of the Third Order of St. Francis and became a hermit, living in a hut near the parish church, under the spiritual direction of the abbot of the local Benedictine abbey.

After four years of following this ascetic way of life, in 1406, Colette came to believe that she was being called to reform the Poor Clares, the Second Order of the Franciscan movement, and return that Order to its original Franciscan ideals of absolute poverty and austerity.

=== Foundation ===
In October of that year, she traveled to Nice to seek the blessing of the Antipope Benedict XIII, who was recognized in France at that time as the rightful pope. Benedict received her and allowed her to take vows as a Poor Clare nun, giving her mission his blessing through several papal bulls, which authorized her both to reform existing monasteries and to found new ones according to her reform.

After spending several years in Beaune in the Duchy of Burgundy, under the guidance of the Blessed Henry of Beaume, O.F.M., (ca. 1367-1439) in 1410 they transferred to the County of Burgundy in 1408, where she established the first successful community of Poor Clare nuns under her inspired way of life in a semi-derelict monastery of the Order in Besançon.

=== Expansion ===
From Besançon her reform spread to Auxonne (1412), to Amiens. It began to spread outside France with foundations in Heidelberg, Germany (1444), and from there to other communities of Poor Clares around Europe. In total, 18 monasteries were founded before her death in March 1447.

Colette established a reform community in Poligny in 1415, and from there another in Ghent in 1442. From Ghent, a Colettine community was established in Bruges in 1457.

For the monasteries which followed her reform, Colette prescribed extreme poverty, going barefoot, and the observance of perpetual fasting and abstinence. The Colettines follow their own Constitutions sanctioned in 1434 by the then-Minister General of the friars, William of Casale, and approved in 1448 by Pope Nicholas V, in 1458 by Pope Pius II, and in 1482 by Pope Sixtus IV.

The community includes both cloistered nuns and extern sisters.

== Colettines in Ireland ==
The Monastery of “Saint Damian’s of the Assumption” was founded in Dublin from the Carlow house in 1905. (Carlow had been founded from Levenshulme in Manchester.) In 2008, they were joined by the nuns from Southampton. The Colettine monastery in Cork was founded in 1914. There is also a community in Belfast, Northern Ireland.

== Colettines in Britain ==
A community of Colettine Poor Clares was founded at Baddesley Clinton in 1850. It was the first community of Poor Clares of the Colettine Reform to be re-established in England after the Reformation. Reduced to four nuns, the house closed in January 2011 and the nuns dispersed to other communities of the order.

In 1857 Poor Clares from Bruges established a monastery at Notting Hill, London, designed by Henry Clutton. Venerable Margaret Sinclair was a nun at Notting Hill. In 1970, the nuns moved to Barnet and the former convent was demolished to make way for a housing estate. The nuns of the Barnet community support themselves, in part, from the sale of the sisters’ homemade marmalade and jams.

In 1865 a community was founded in York from Bruges at the instigation of Marcia, Lady Herries. St. Joseph's Monastery was designed by George Goldie. With numbers declining, the nuns moved to a smaller premises in Askham Bryan. The property in York was turned into student accommodation and apartments.

The Colettine house in Neath was established from Dublin in 1950. In 2006, the five remaining nuns, all over seventy, decided that they were getting too old to train novices through six years of formation. The premises were sold and the nuns joined a convent in Bothwell.

The Colettine monastery in Nottingham was founded in 1927 and was home to a shrine of Our Lady of Confidence. In 1928, Bishop Francis Vaughan asked his cousin, Mother Felix Clare Vaughan, abbess of Notting Hill, to send sisters to his Welsh diocese, and the community of Ty Mam Duw was founded. In 2018, the nuns from Ty Mam Duw in Hawarden joined those of Nottingham. Although they had hoped to renovate a smaller building, in May 2023, the nuns vacated the deteriorating monastery and purchased a Poor Clares convent in Hereford, with the proceeds from the sale of the monastery in Hawarden.

The Monastery of Our Lady and St Joseph in Ellesmere, Shropshire is an enclosed community attached to the parish church of St. Michael.

== Colettines in the United States ==
There are today twelve monasteries of Poor Clares of the Colettine observance in the United States, originating from St. Colette’s foundation in Ghent. A house at Tongres was founded from Ghent in 1845; Tongres in turn sent a colony of nuns to Düsseldorf, Germany in 1859. Forced into exile by Bismarck's Kulturkampf, the Düsseldorf Poor Clares carried the primitive ideal first to the Netherlands and then to the United States, establishing the first Poor Clare monastery of the reform of St. Colette in Cleveland, Ohio in 1877. It is from this Cleveland motherhouse that the other American foundations were made, including a monastery in Chicago, Illinois in 1893.

In 1916 Bishop Peter James Muldoon, of Rockford, Illinois invited the sisters in Cleveland to establish a presence in his diocese.

From Cleveland's 1893 foundation in Chicago, a new foundation was made in Roswell, New Mexico in November of 1948. The Roswell monastery has in its turn made six foundations.

The Poor Clare Monastery of Our Lady of Mercy, in Belleville, Illinois, under the patronage of Our Lady of Guadalupe, was founded in June 1986 from the Poor Clare Monastery of Our Lady of Guadalupe in Roswell, New Mexico.

Seven founding sisters arrived in Kokomo, Indiana in 1959, at the invitation of Most Rev. John J. Carberry, the bishop of the Diocese of Lafayette-in-Indiana.

Today there are also monasteries in California, Illinois and Virginia. Foundations from the American monasteries have been established in Brazil (1950) and the Netherlands (1990).

== Friars ==
A branch of Franciscan friars following the spirit of Colette's reform was established and approved, under the leadership of Henry de Beaume. They were known as Coletans, and were connected to the monasteries of the Colettine nuns. By 1448, there were thirteen friaries of this branch. Along with other smaller reforms, they were merged by the Holy See into the Observant branch of the friars in 1517.

== See also ==
- Saint Colette
- Mary Magdalen Bentivoglio
- Poor Clares

== External sources ==
- Poor Clare Monastery of Our Lady of Guadalupe, Roswell, New Mexico
- Immaculate Heart Monastery, Los Altos Hills, California
- Monastery of Poor Clares, Santa Barbara, California
