= Colette of Corbie =

Franciscan foundress, abbess and saint (1381–1447)

Saint Colette of Corbie, P.C.C.
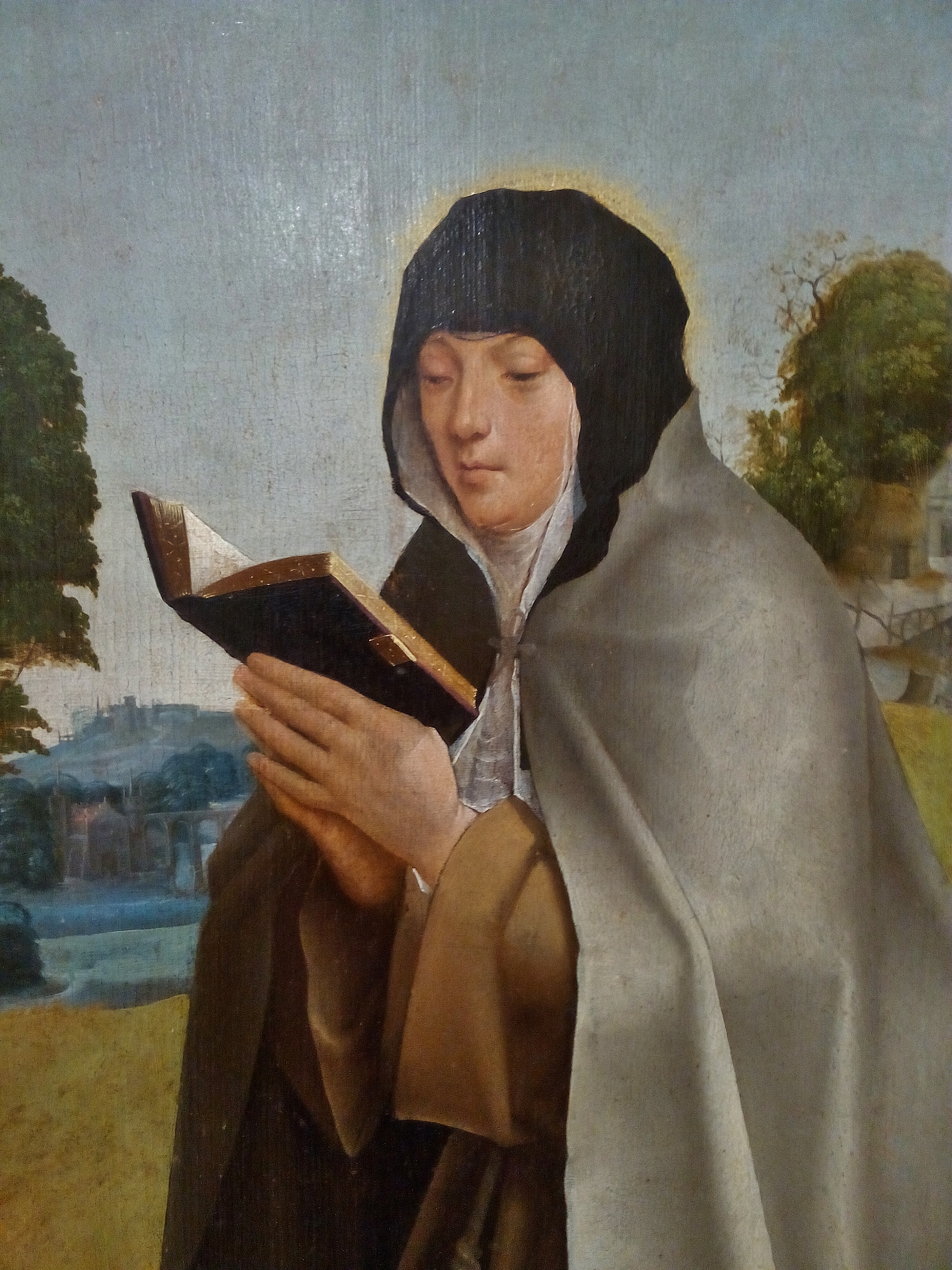
- Saint Colette (detail of Saint Clare and Saint Colette, c. 1520, by the Master of Lourinhã; National Museum of Ancient Art, Portugal)

Virgin and Foundress
- Born: Nicole Boellet; 13 January 1381; Corbie, County of Amiens, Duchy of Burgundy
- Died: 6 March 1447 (aged 66); Ghent, County of Flanders, Duchy of Burgundy
- Venerated in: Catholic Church (Franciscan Order)
- Beatified: 23 January 1740 by Pope Clement XII
- Canonized: 24 May 1807 by Pope Pius VII
- Feast: 6 March (7 February for the Franciscan Order)
- Patronage: women seeking to conceive, expectant mothers and sick children

Colette of Corbie, PCC (13 January 1381 – 6 March 1447) was a French abbess and the foundress of the Colettine Poor Clares, a reform branch of the Order of Saint Clare, better known as the Poor Clares. She is honored as a saint in the Catholic Church. Due to a number of miraculous events claimed during her life, she is venerated as a patron saint of women seeking to conceive, expectant mothers, and sick children.

== Life ==
=== Early life ===
She was born Nicolette Boellet (or Boylet) in the village of Corbie, in the Picardy region of France, on 13 January 1381 to Robert Boellet, a poor carpenter at the noted Benedictine Abbey of Corbie, and to his wife, Marguerite Moyon. Her contemporary biographers say that her parents had grown old without having children, before praying to Saint Nicholas for help in having a child. Their prayers were answered when, at the age of 60, Marguerite gave birth to a daughter. Out of gratitude, they named the baby after the saint to whom they credited the miracle of her birth. She was affectionately called Nicolette by her parents, which soon came to be shorted to Colette, by which name she is known.

After her parents died in 1399, Colette joined the Beguines but found their manner of life unchallenging. Joining a Benedictine order as a lay sister, most likely to avoid an arranged marriage, she again became dissatisfied. In September 1402, Colette received the habit of the Third Order of St. Francis and became a hermit under the direction of the Abbot of Corbie, living near the abbey church. After four years of following this ascetic way of life (1402–1406), through several dreams and visions, she came to believe that she was being called to reform the Franciscan Second Order and to return it to its original Franciscan ideals of absolute poverty and austerity.

=== Foundress ===
In October 1406, she turned to the Antipope Benedict XIII of Avignon who was recognized in France as the rightful pope. Benedict received her in Nice, in southern France, and allowed her to transfer to the Order of Poor Clares. Additionally, he empowered her through several papal bulls, issued between 1406 and 1412, to found new monasteries and to complete the reform of the Order.

With the approval of the Countess of Geneva and the aid of the Franciscan itinerant preacher, Henry de Beaume (her confessor and spiritual director), Colette began her work at Beaune, in the Diocese of Geneva. She remained there only a short time. In 1410, she opened her first monastery at Besançon, in an almost-abandoned house of Urbanist Poor Clares. From there, her reform spread to Auxonne (1412), to Poligny (1415), to Ghent (1412), to Heidelberg (1444), to Amiens, to Pont-à-Mousson in Lorraine, and to other communities of Poor Clares. During her lifetime 18 monasteries of her reform were founded. For the monasteries which followed her reform, she prescribed extreme poverty, going barefoot, and the observance of perpetual fasting and abstinence.

In addition to the strict rules of the Poor Clares, the Colettines follow their special Constitutions, approved in 1434 by the Minister General of the friars, William of Casale, and approved in 1448 by Pope Nicholas V, again in 1458 by Pope Pius II, and in 1482 by Pope Sixtus IV.

Colette died at Ghent in March 1447.

== Veneration ==
Colette was beatified 23 January 1740 by Pope Clement XII and was canonized on 24 May 1807 by Pope Pius VII. She is invoked by childless couples desiring to become parents and is also the patroness of expectant mothers and sick infants.

== Legacy ==
=== Colettine nuns ===
Colettine nuns are found in France, Ireland, Italy, the United Kingdom, and the United States.

=== Colettine friars ===
Together with friar Henry of Beaume, Colette also inaugurated a reform among the Franciscan friars (who were known as the Coletans), not to be confounded with the Observants. These friars formed a unique branch of the Order of Friars Minor under Henry's authority but remained obedient to the authority of the Minister Provincial of the Observant Franciscan friars in France and never attained much importance, even there. In 1448, they had only thirteen friaries, all attached to monasteries of the Colettine nuns. Together with other small branches of the Friars Minor, they were merged into the wider Observant branch in 1517 by Pope Leo X.

== Miracles ==
According to biographers, Colette performed numerous miracles, including multiplication of food or wine and effecting cures, partly after her death.

=== Helping a mother in childbirth ===
While traveling to Nice to meet Pope Benedict, Colette stayed at the home of a friend. His wife was in labor at that time with their third child, and was having major difficulties in the childbirth, leaving her in danger of death. Colette immediately went to the local church to pray for her.

The mother gave birth successfully and survived the ordeal. She credited Colette's prayers for this. The child born, a girl named Petronilla, later entered a monastery founded by Colette. She would become Colette's secretary and biographer.

=== Saving a sick child ===
After the pope had authorized Colette to establish a regimen of strict poverty in the Poor Clare monasteries of France, she started with that of Besançon. The local populace was suspicious of her reform, with its total reliance on them for the sustenance of the monastery. One incident helped turn this around.

On another occasion, she revived a stillborn child, taking off the veil given to her by the Pope, when he gave her the habit of the Second Order, and wrapping the child's body in it.

== Pictures ==
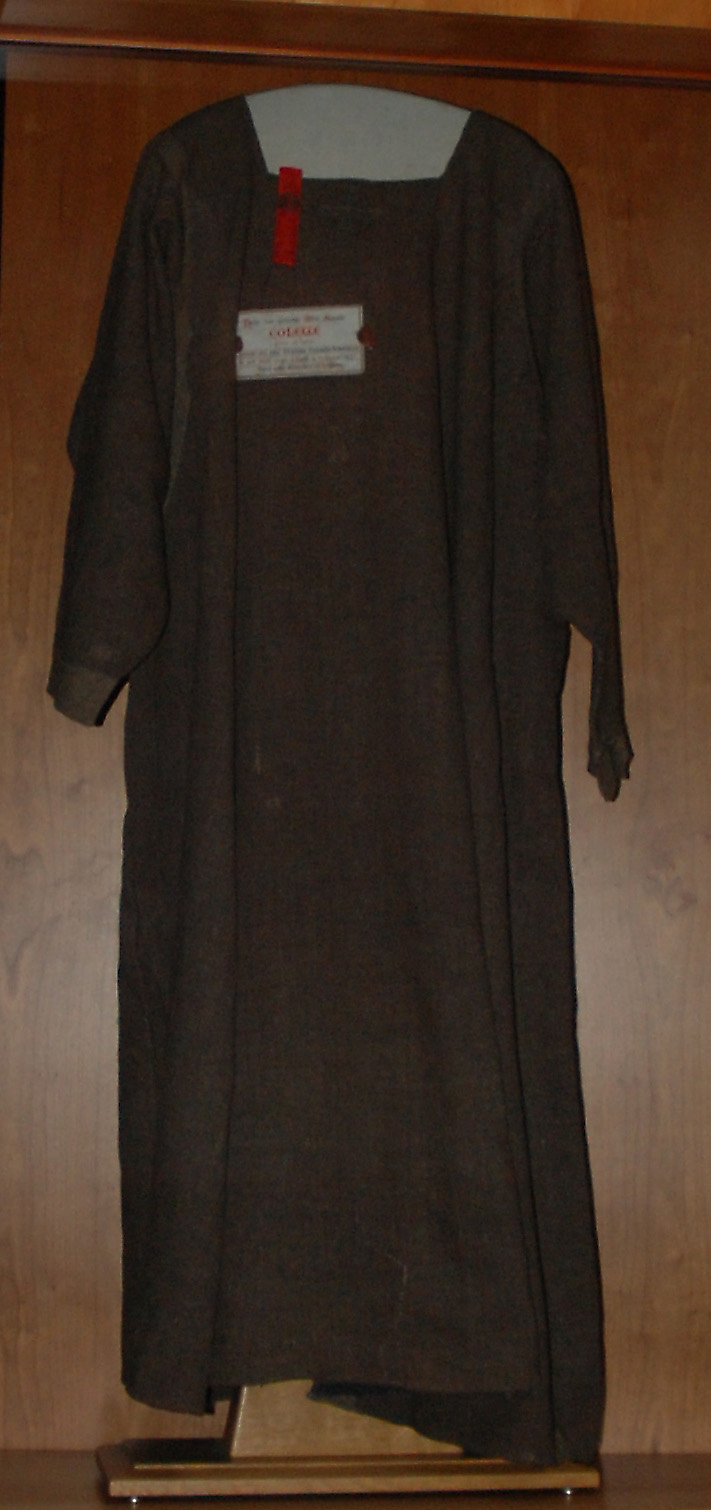
Habit of Saint Colette
Ghent, Belgium

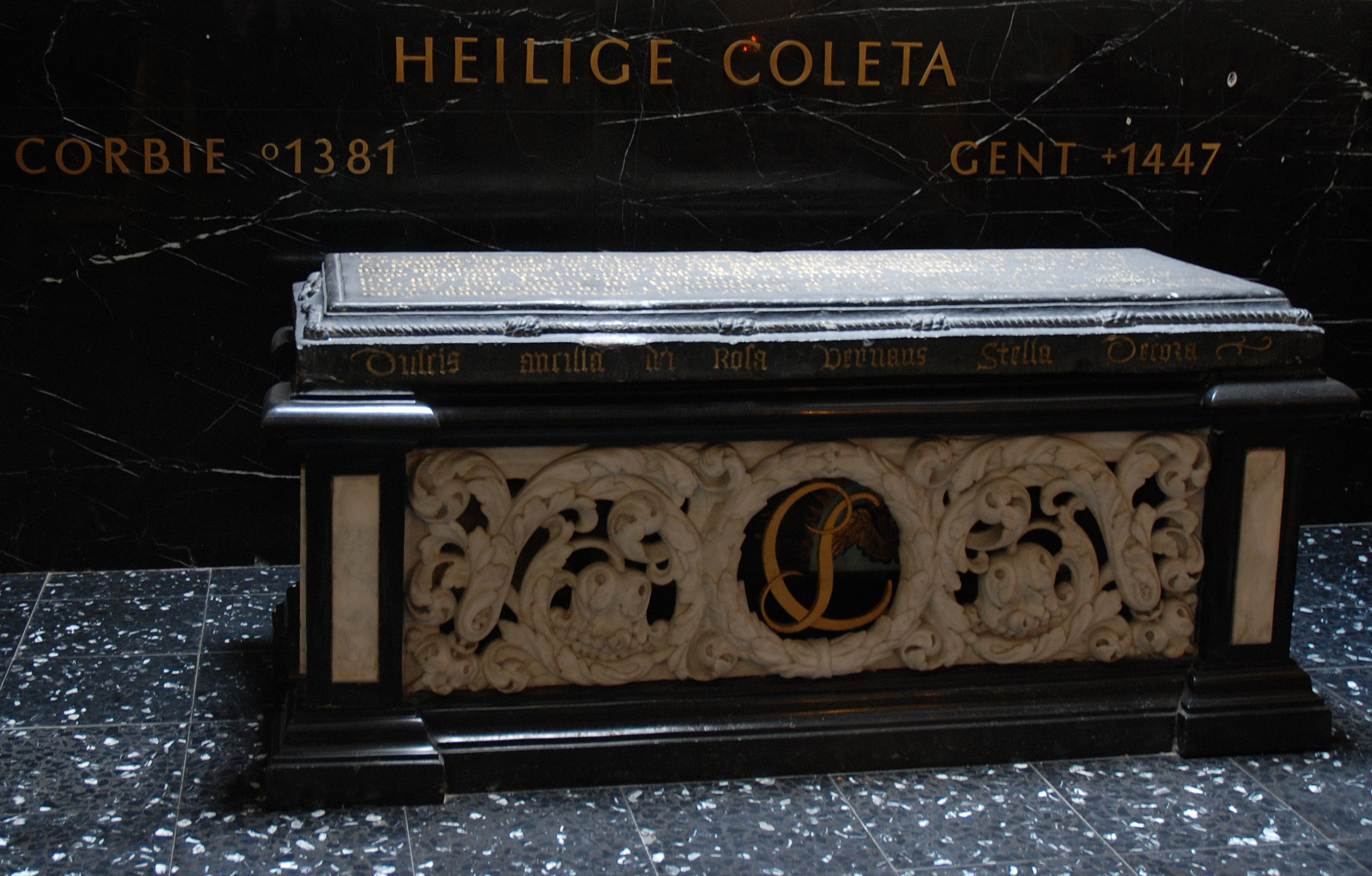
Remains of Saint Colette Ghent, Belgium

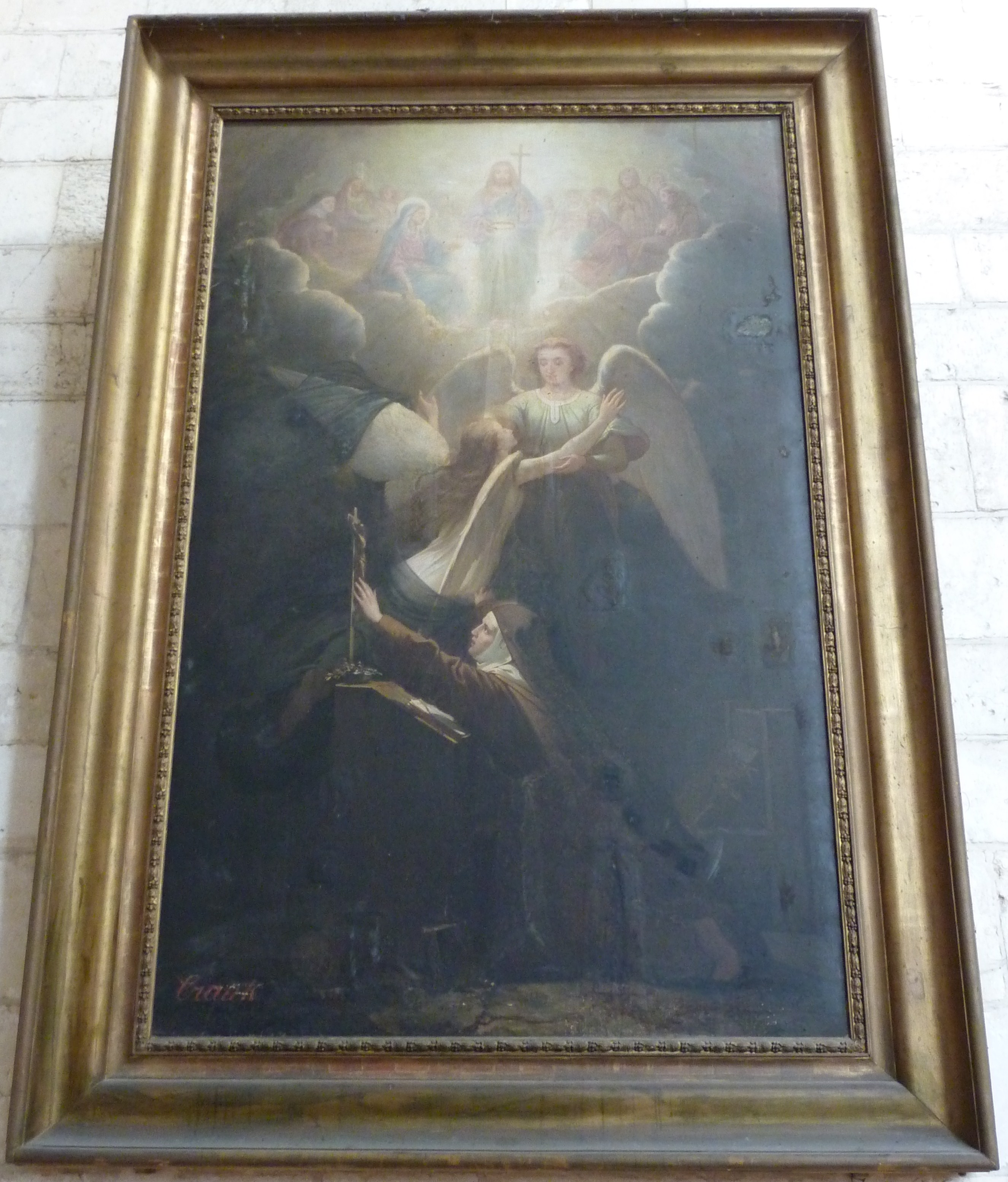
Saint Colette
by Charles Crauk

== See also ==
- Colettine Poor Clares

== Bibliography ==
- Farmer, David (1997). "Colette". Oxford Dictionary of Saints. Oxford University Press.
- Roest, Bert (2013). Order and Disorder: The Poor Clares Between Foundation and Reform. Brill.
- Colette of Corbie (1381 - 1447): Learning and Holiness, Franciscan Institute Publications, 2010. ISBN 978-1-57659-217-5
