= Koletek Street =

Street in Kraków, Poland

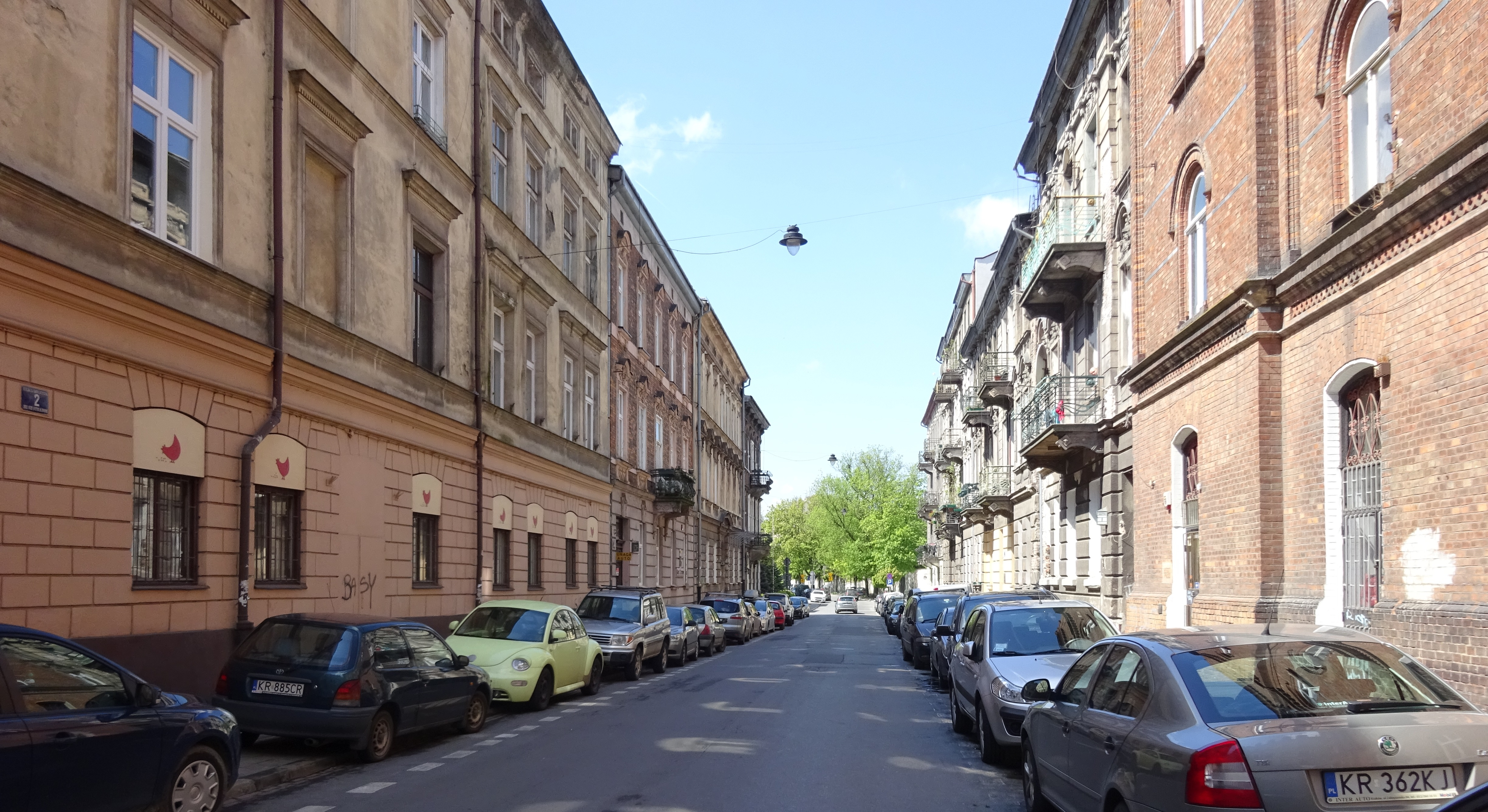
- View from the Świętej Agnieszki Street towards the west (Vistula Boulevards)
- Interactive map of Koletek Street
- Part of: Stradom
- Owner: City of Kraków
- Location: Kraków

UNESCO World Heritage Site
- Type: Cultural
- Criteria: iv
- Designated: 1978
- Part of: Historic Centre of Kraków
- Reference no.: 29
- Region: Europe and North America

Historic Monument of Poland
- Designated: 1994-09-08
- Part of: Kraków historical city complex
- Reference no.: M.P. 1994 nr 50 poz. 418

Koletek Street (Polish: Ulica Koletek, lit. Colettine Sisters Street) is a historic street in Stradom, the former district of Kraków, Poland.

It connects Świętej Agnieszki Street with Smocza Street, which is its extension.

== History ==
Established in 1844. Initially called Mikołaj Kopernik Street. The current name derives from the convent of the Colettine Sisters and their chapel of St. Colette, located here between 1593 and 1820, and has been in use since 1858.

Most of the buildings are tenement houses.

== Buildings ==
Prepared based on the source:

- 1 Koletek Street – Tenement house, designed by Beniamin Torbe, 20th century.
- 3 Koletek Street – Tenement house, designed by Beniamin Torbe, 1905.
- 4 Koletek Street – Tenement house, designed by Karol Knaus, 1887.
- 5 Koletek Street – Tenement house, designed by Beniamin Torbe, 1905.
- 6 Koletek Street – Tenement house, designed by Władysław Kopald and Maksymilian Nitsch, around 1889.
- 7 Koletek Street – Tenement house, designed by Henryk Lamensdorf, 1911.
- 8 Koletek Street – Tenement house, designed by Karol Knaus, 1895.
- 9 Koletek Street – Classicist manor house of Father Mateusz Dubicki, chancellor of the cathedral, from the early 19th century.
- 10 Koletek Street – Manor house of the Colettine Sisters, later the seat of the Military Recruitment Office-Kraków Podgórze.
- 12 Koletek Street (2 Sukiennicza Street) – former convent of the Colettine Sisters, later a Home for the Elderly of the Kraków Charitable Society. Since 2013, a residential building.
- 15 Koletek Street – Tenement house, designed by I. Knause, 1911.
- 17 Koletek Street – Tenement house, designed by I. Knause, 1911.
- 19 Koletek Street – Tenement house, designed by I. Knause, 1911.
- 22 Koletek Street – Football stadium, tennis courts, and club buildings of Nadwiślan Kraków.
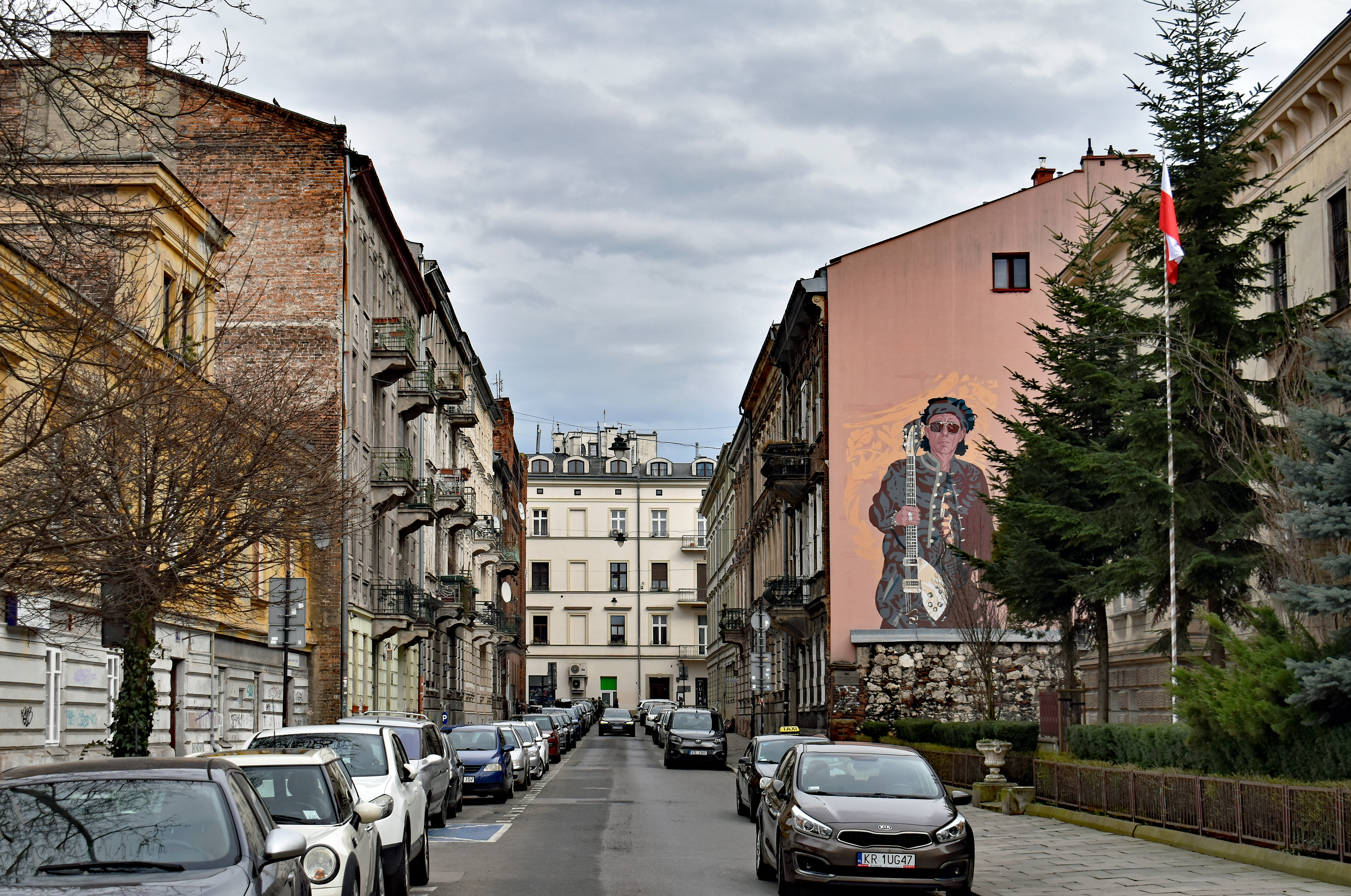
Eastern part of the street.
In the tenement house at 8 Koletek Street mural dedicated to Andrzej Bieniasz, musician of the Püdels.

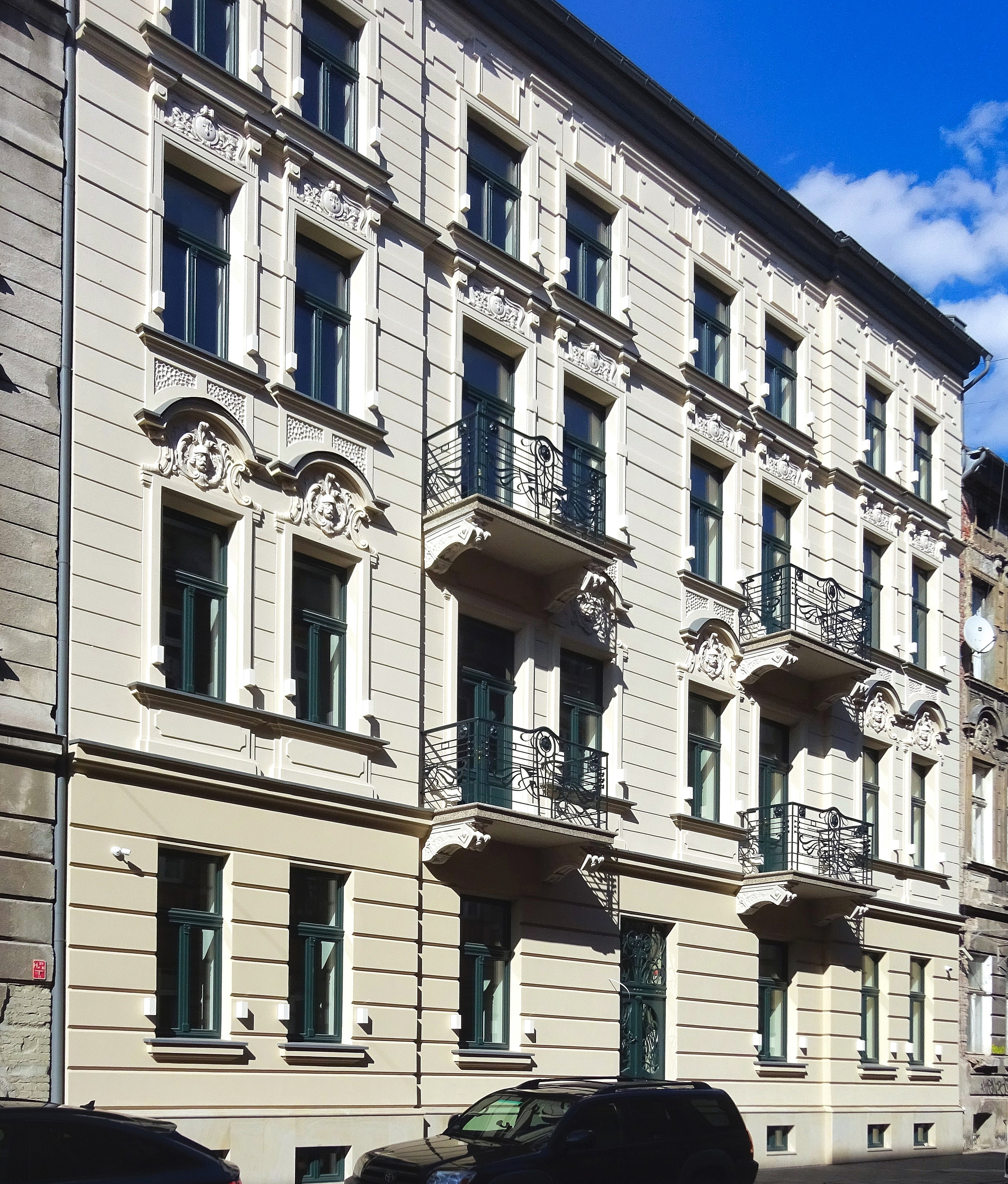
3 Koletek Street
Tenement house (design. Beniamin Torbe, 1905–1911)

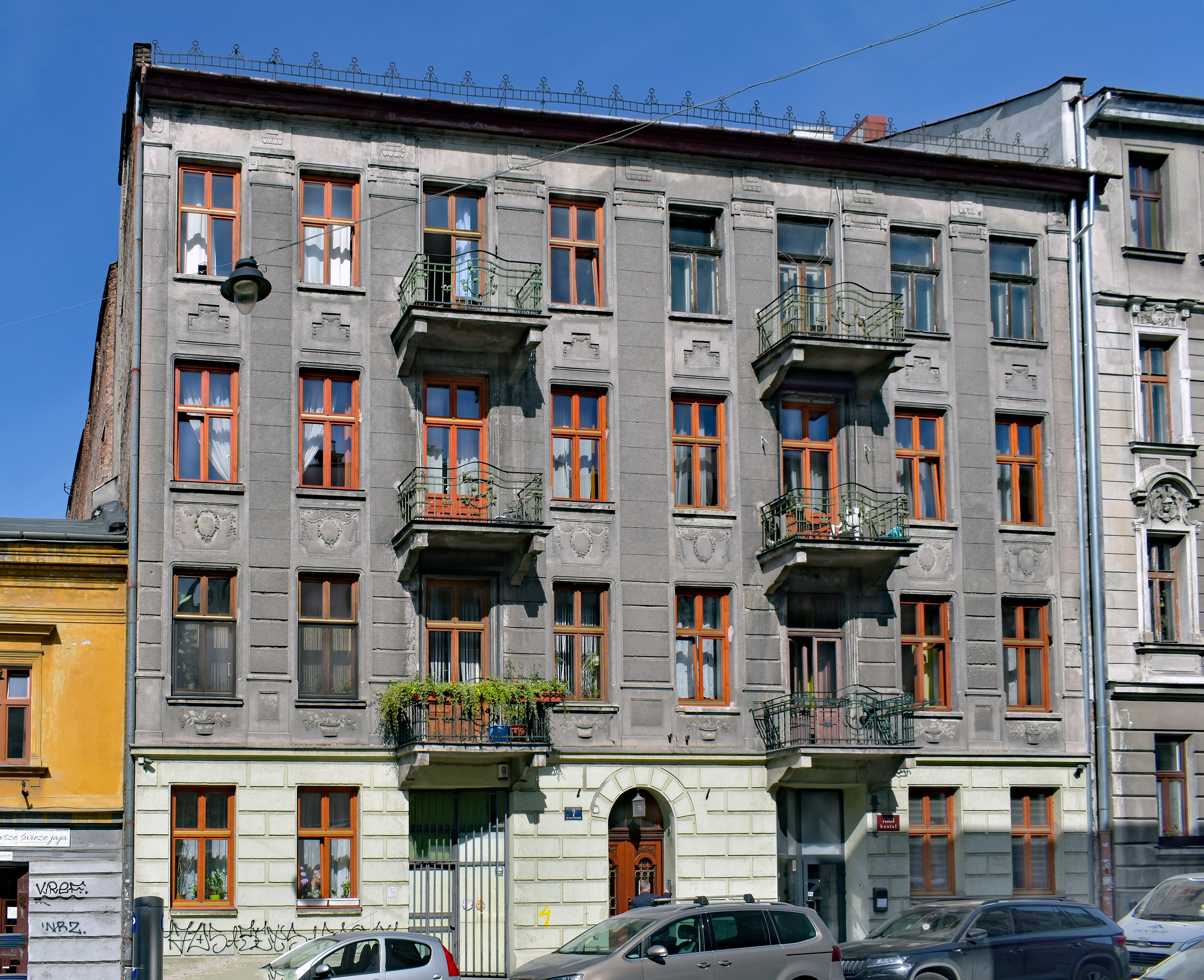
7 Koletek Street
Tenement house (design. Henryk Lamensdorf, 1911)

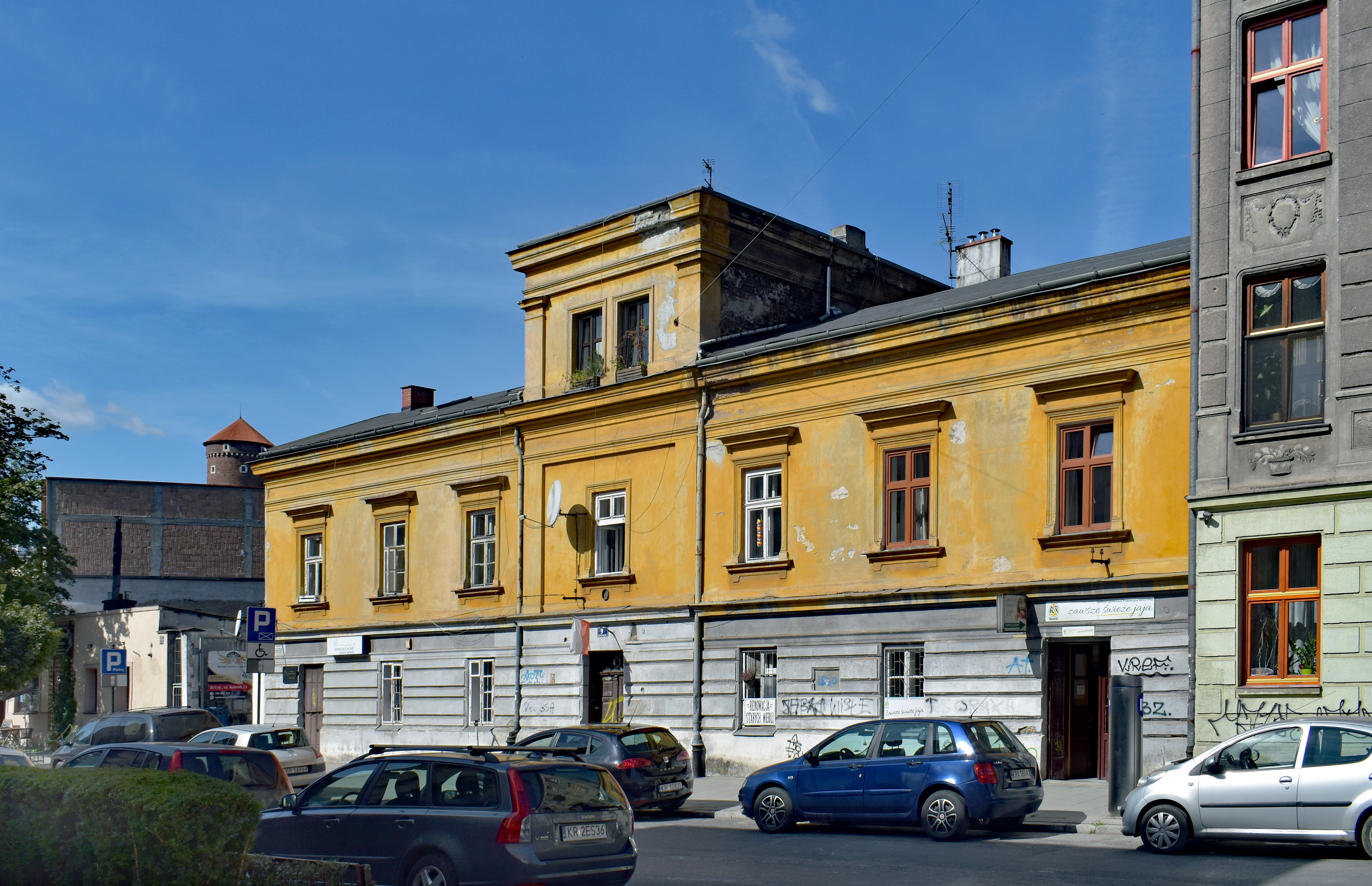
9 Koletek Street
Historic manor house of Canon Dubicki.

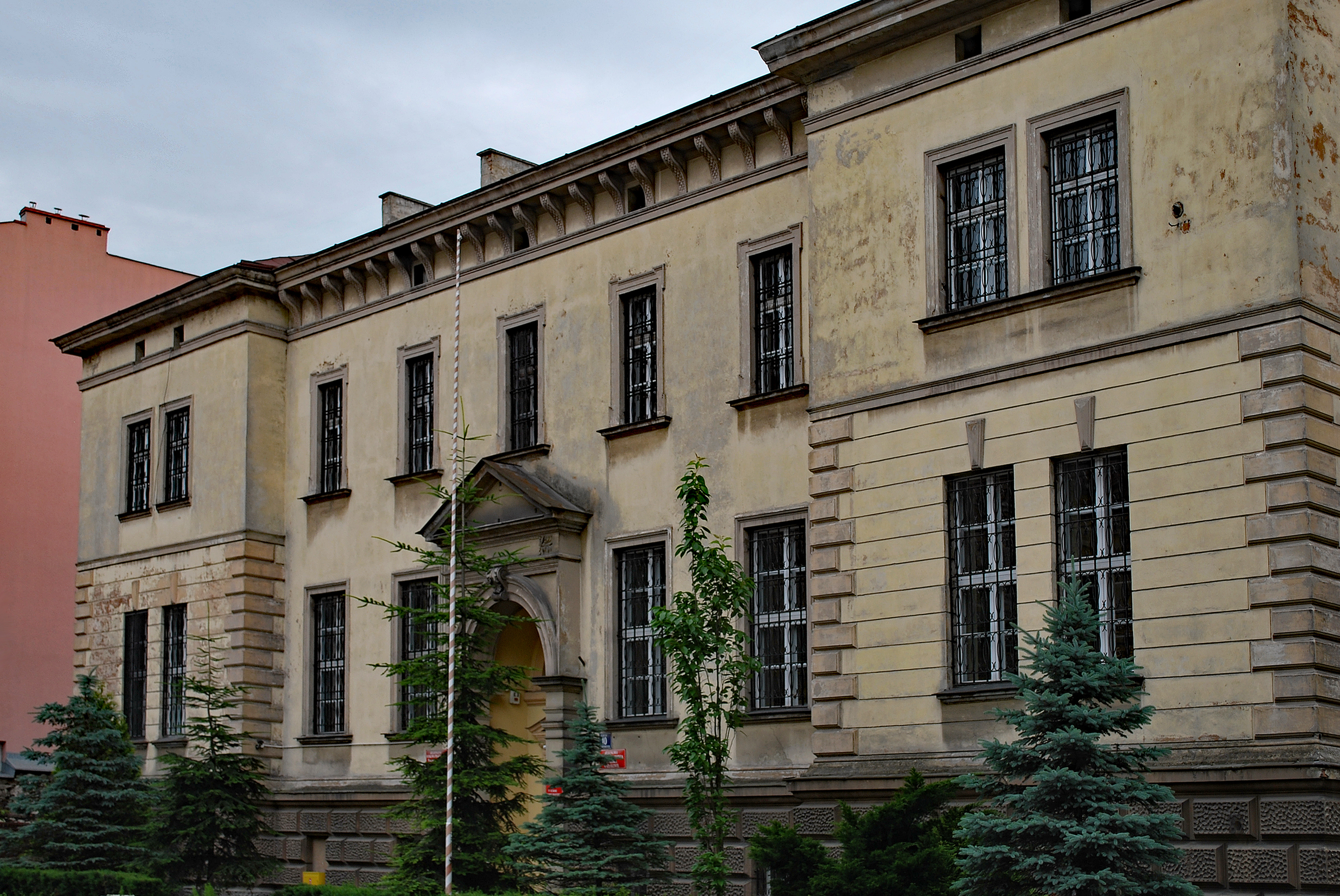
10 Koletek Street
Former manor house of the Colettine Sisters.

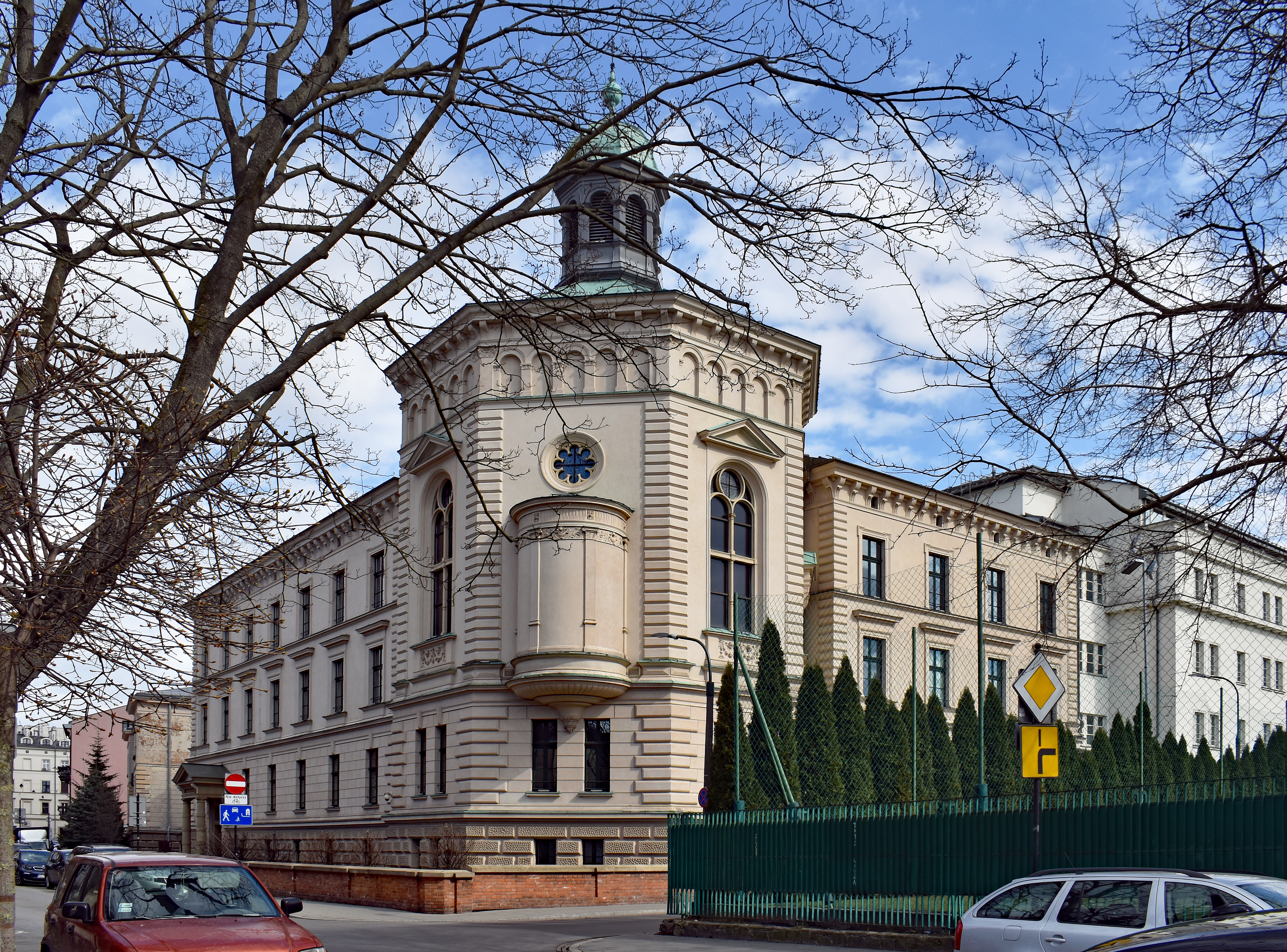
12 Koletek Street
Former monastery and chapel of the Colettine Sisters.
