= Carmelite Monks =

Catholic order

Two Carmelite Monks chanting during their Saturday Compline liturgy

The Carmelite Monks or Monks of the Most Blessed Virgin Mary of Mount Carmel are a public association within the Diocese of Cheyenne, dedicated to a humble life of prayer. The Wyoming Carmelites claim loyalty to the Magisterium of the Catholic Church and to the Carmelite charism. Their life includes strict separation from the world and the living of the cloistered Carmelite spirituality and way of life established by John of the Cross and Teresa of Jesus. In accord with the Carmelite Rule, they engage in manual labor and the study of Carmelite spirituality in the solitude of the mountains, with the firm hope of attaining to union with God.

== Cloistered Carmelites ==
Carmelite monks, who are cloistered Carmelites, dedicate their lives to prayer and the pursuit of virtue, serving as a hidden source of grace to support the Catholic Church's mission globally. The priests, known as choir monks, dedicate their hidden priesthood to daily Mass, chanting the Divine Office, and seeking the mystical life through personal holiness and contemplative prayer. Despite their cloistered lifestyle, they share the fruits of their solitude by providing confession and spiritual guidance to visitors.

As cloistered Wyoming Carmelites, they are not active friars, but pray for their fellow Carmelites who have that mission. For this reason, they do not belong to either the Ancient Observance or Discalced branches of the Carmelite Order. All Carmelites originated as hermit monks, but the main branches of the order have been mendicant friars since the 13th century.

In one of the first works of the Carmelite Order, The Institutions of the First Monks, written near the beginning of the order, the charism of the Carmelites was laid out as a hidden life of contemplative prayer carried out in the solitary wilderness by a monk. The Carmelite monks follow this same solitary monastic Carmelite charism.

Cloistered Carmelite nuns also consider themselves to be cloistered monastic hermits. Their life and the lives of the Carmelite monks' are similar in that both are cloistered Carmelite contemplatives and follow many of the same customs.

== Background ==
The Carmelite monks were founded in 2003 by the authority of Bishop David Ricken in the Roman Catholic Diocese of Cheyenne, Wyoming, with Daniel Mary Schneider as the first and founding Prior of the community.

Schneider was trained for eleven years in a hermitage of the Ancient Observance and through a close relationship with several houses of cloistered Discalced Carmelite nuns. Schneider was clothed as a Carmelite by members of the order and lived in vows in a house of the order for many years.

The Carmelite monks use the suffix M.Carm. to designate membership in their order, which is the abbreviation of the Latin words Monachi Carmeli. This means 'Monks of Carmel' in English.

== Charism ==
The Carmelite monks' spirituality and life are based on four pillars that are essential to their identity. The first pillar is filial union with the Blessed Virgin; the second, the Rule of Saint Albert; the third, the traditional Carmelite Liturgy, and the fourth, the Carmelite spirituality and monastic inspiration of the way of life of Teresa of Jesus and John of the Cross.

The monks live a strict horarium that includes the midnight office, two hours of mental prayer, common rosary, chanted sung mass, and manual labor.

A young Carmelite monk, Simon Mary, described his community's charism in this way in a 2008 interview:

Carmelite monks are consecrated to God through the vows of obedience, chastity, and poverty. Our time is spent in prayer and penance for the salvation of souls, interceding for the Church and the world, as well as in the study of Scripture and the fathers and doctors of the Church . . . Our monks live strict constitutional enclosure – we don't leave the monastery at all, . . . with[out] permission from the Bishop.

== Traditional liturgy ==
The Carmelite Monks of Wyoming use the traditional Latin liturgy of the Carmelite Rite, which is similar to the Tridentine Mass. The Carmelite Rite, based on the Rite of the Holy Sepulchre, was used by the Ancient Observance branch of the Carmelite Order from the time of the first hermits on Mount Carmel in the Holy Land in the late 12th century, until Vatican II at which time the Carmelites began to celebrate the ordinary form of the Roman Rite Mass. The first Rule of Carmel was given to the Carmelites by Albert of Jerusalem, the Latin Patriarch of Jerusalem, who in that time was exiled in the city of Acre, Israel, from which place Mount Carmel was visible to the south.

== New Mount Carmel ==

In the early 2000s, a group of Carmelite Monks began building a stone monastery near Meeteetse, Wyoming. By 2024, they were mostly complete, with all buildings but the chapel already standing.

=== Background ===
Separation from the world for contemplative prayer is essential to the life of the Carmelite monks, their monasteries are founded in the mountains to ensure geographical enclosure. In modern times where noise abounds, the monks desire true silence and an atmosphere of natural solitude. The monks explain how the mountains provide this: "In the mountains, often wild and remote, the soul can make a swift journey towards union with God; the beauty of the wilderness alone raises the mind and heart to the Eternal Father who created the things of this world. In the mountains the Carmelite monks will at last be in a place conducive to their life and in keeping with their Holy Rule."

=== Founding of New Mount Carmel ===
In 2003, Carmelite monks founded the New Mount Carmel in the mountains of Wyoming, where the original Carmelite charism is being lived out. This reflects the continual effort of Carmelites throughout the centuries to return to the eremitical life of a hermit in the mountains in imitation of Elijah from the Book of Kings in the Old Testament. The Carmelite monks were nearing completion of their Gothic Revival monastery in the Rocky Mountains.

== Mystic Monk Coffee ==
The Carmelite monks' Mystic Monk Coffee business was established to help support the Carmelite monks' monastery. The coffee has won awards from coffee reviewers and is known for its small-batch quality and freshness.

== See also ==
- Constitutions of the Carmelite Order
- The Institutions of the First Monks
