= Świętej Agnieszki Street =

Street in Kraków, Poland

Świętej Agnieszki street
Kraków
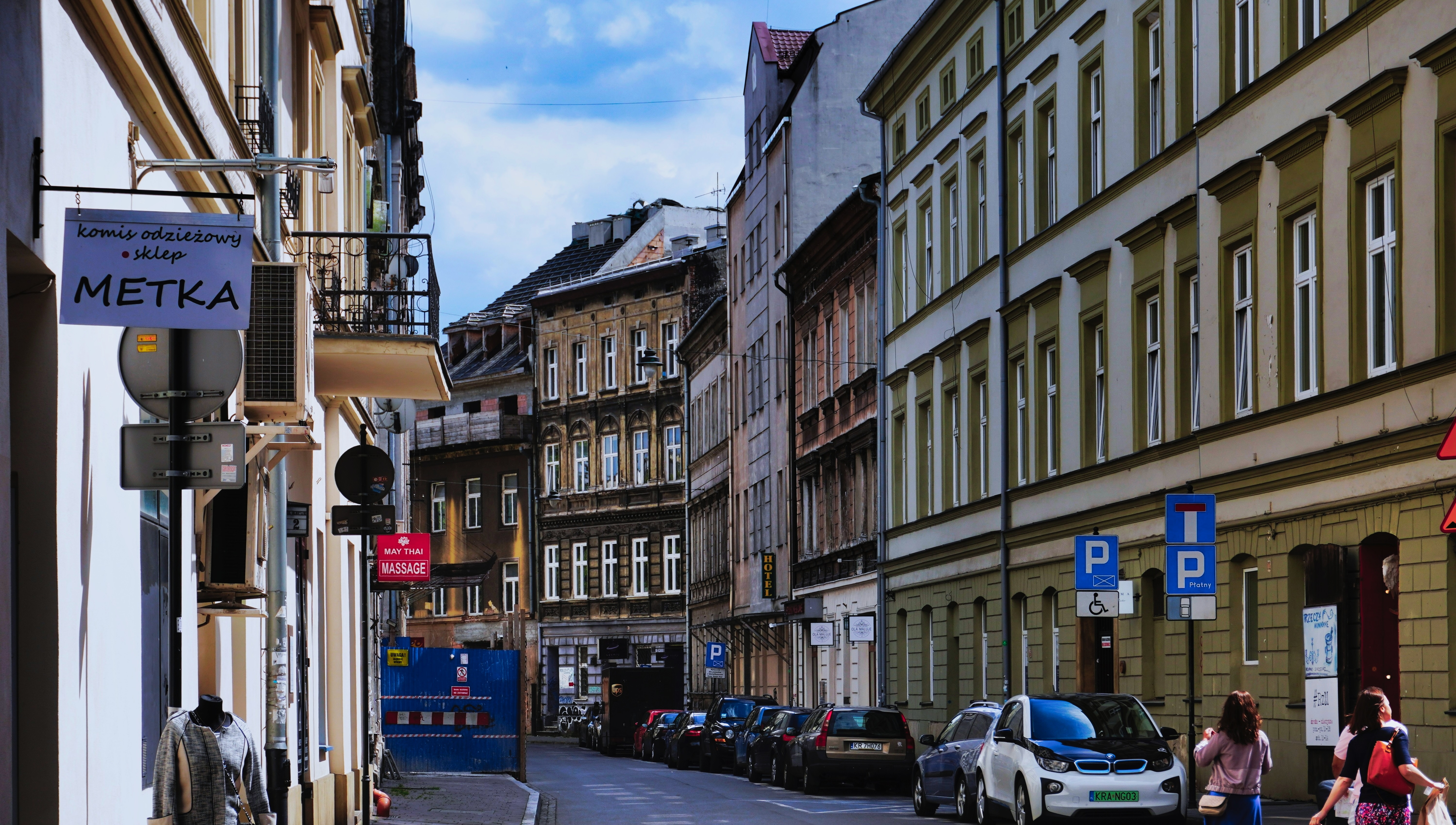
- View from the intersection with Koletek Street to the south
- Interactive map of Świętej Agnieszki street
- Part of: Kraków Old Town
- Owner: City of Kraków
- Location: Kraków, Poland

Świętej Agnieszki Street in Kraków is a street in Kraków, in District I Old Town, in Stradom.

== History ==
Established in 1823. It received its current name in 1836, derived from the nearby garrison church of St. Agnes. The buildings consist of rental tenements constructed between 1870 and 1889.

== Buildings ==
Prepared based on the source:

- 1 Świętej Agnieszki Street (2 Koletek Street) – Tenement house, designed by Jacek Matusiński, 1870.
- 2 Świętej Agnieszki Street (19 Stradomska Street) – Tenement house, designed by Bogumił Trenner, 1845.
- 3 Świętej Agnieszki Street – Tenement house, designed by T. Cochno, 1876.
- 4 Świętej Agnieszki Street – Tenement house, designed by [unknown], 1892.
- 5 Świętej Agnieszki Street – There was the synagogue of the Michał Hirsch Cypres Association of Prayer and Charity, which was devastated by the Germans during World War II.
- 6 Świętej Agnieszki Street – Tenement house, designed by Beniamin Torbe, 1901.
- 7 Świętej Agnieszki Street – Tenement house, designed by Leopold Tlachna, 1887.
- 9 Świętej Agnieszki Street – Tenement house, designed by Leopold Tlachna, 1887.
- 10 Świętej Agnieszki Street – There is a historic tenement house listed in the register of monuments under position A-944.
- 11 Świętej Agnieszki Street – There was the synagogue of the Israel Meisels Association, which was devastated by the Germans during World War II.
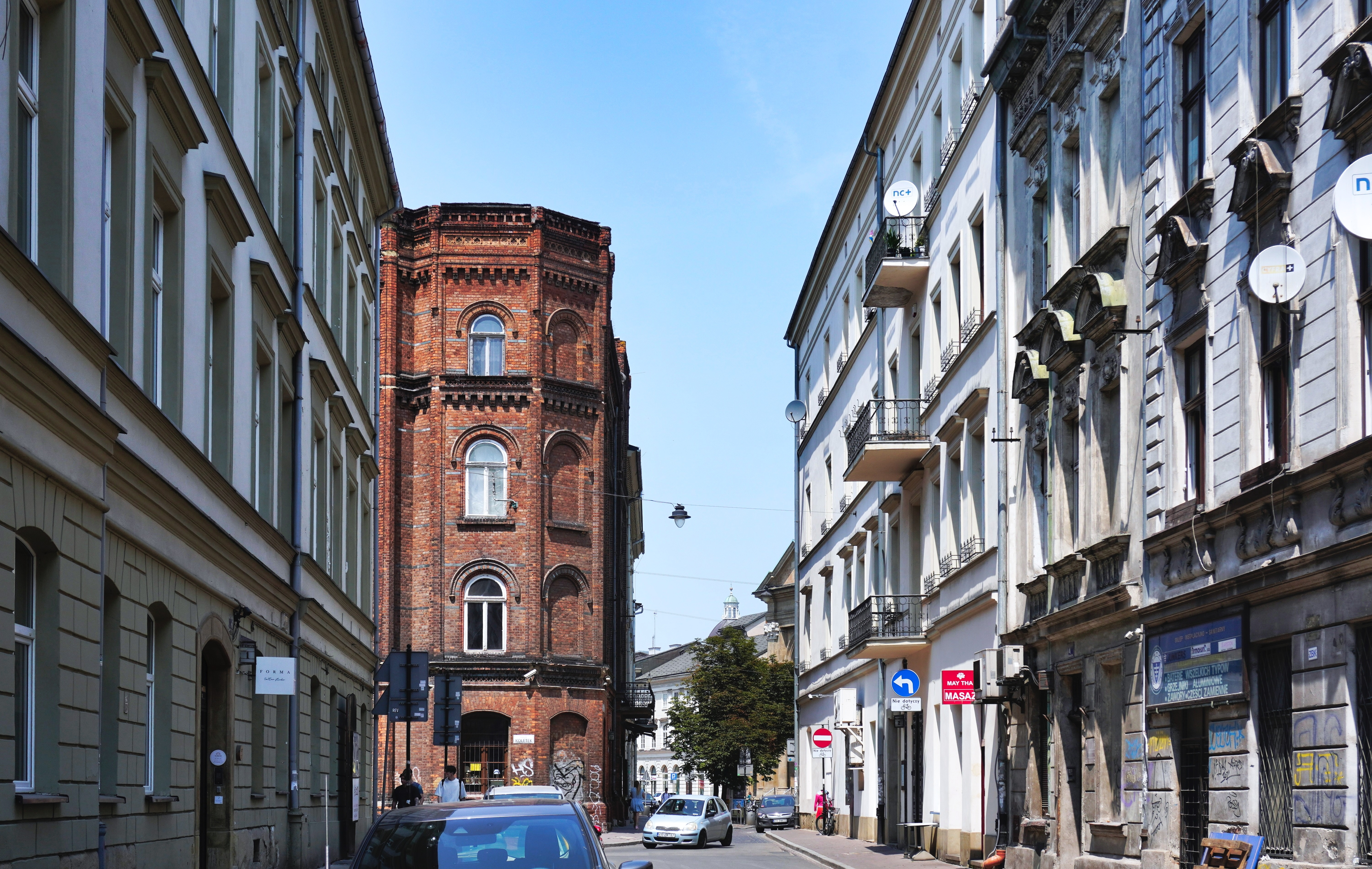
View from Józef Dietl Street in the north

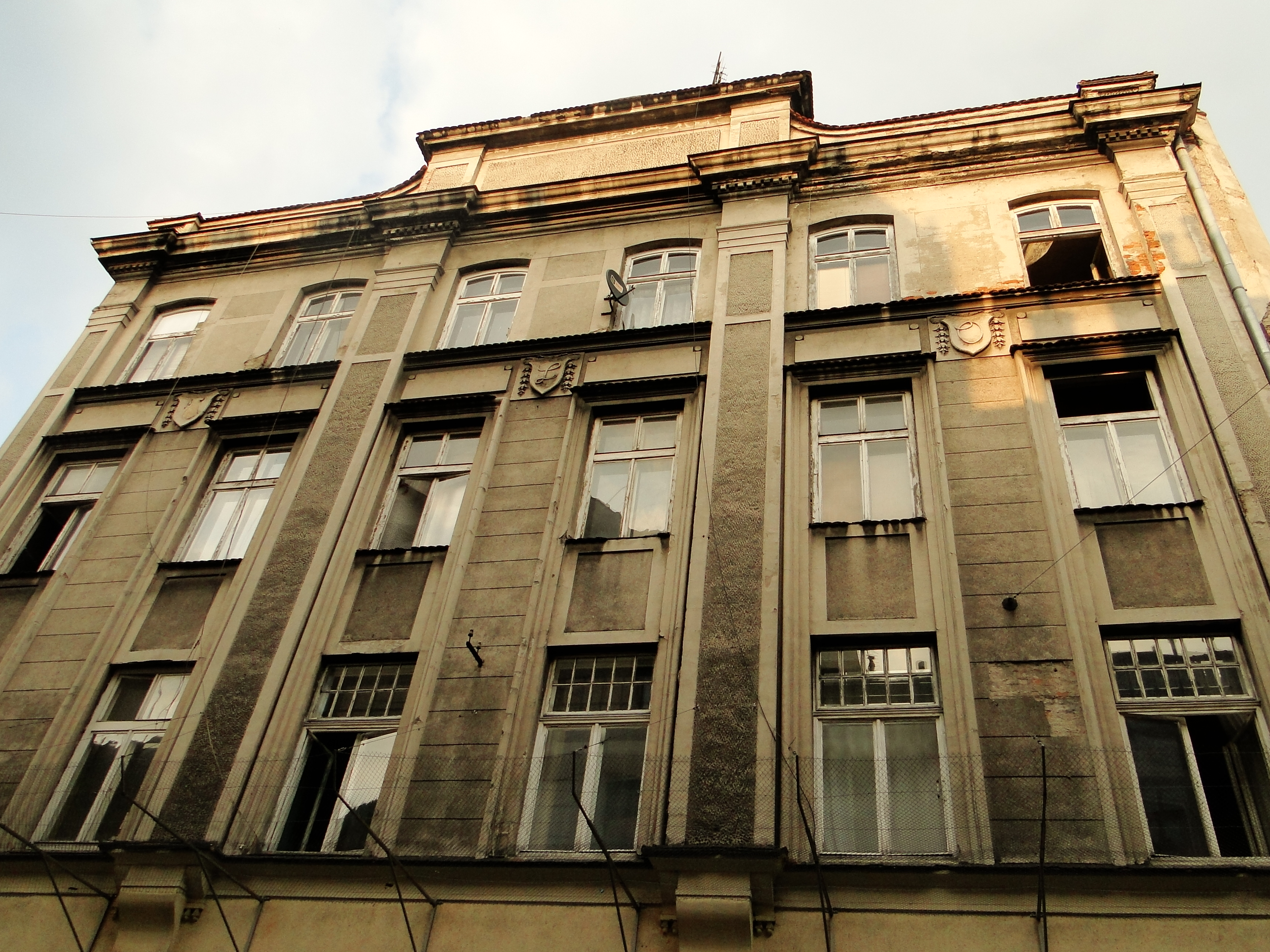
10 Świętej Agnieszki Street
Tenement house
