= Henry de Beaume =

Franciscan friar, priest and theologian (c. 1367–1439)

Henry de Beaume, O.F.M. (Latin: Henricus de Balma), (c. 1367 – 23 February 1439), also known as Hugh Balme, was a Franciscan friar, priest and theologian. He became a supporter of the reform work of Colette of Corbie, among the Poor Clare nuns, which, in turn, led a reform movement of his own branch of the Franciscan Order. He is honored as a Blessed within the Order.

== Life ==
De Beaume was born in Geneva to a noble family in the service of the Dukes of Savoy. He entered the Province of Burgundy of the Order of Friars Minor, possibly at the friary in Chambéry. According to one source, he was a member of the community of friars in Mirabeau when they accepted the Observant reform then growing among the Friars Minor. He soon became a noted itinerant preacher in the region.

De Beaume was a man of exceptional worth according to the testimony of Colette of Corbie, whose confessor he became in 1406 while she was still an anchoress at the Benedictine Abbey of Corbie. He confirmed the validity of her call to reform the Poor Clares, and accompanied her to the papal court then residing in Nice. There the Antipope Benedict XIII authorized Colette's program of reform and appointed de Beaume as her guide and spiritual assistant in this. Several attempts at founding a community of nuns which would follow the original Rule of St. Clare were made in the County of Burgundy, with one finally taking root successfully in Besançon.

Communities of friars developed alongside the monasteries of nuns which Colette went on to found. They followed the same spirit of austerity as the nuns and soon became known as the Colettine friars (Coletans). The Ministers General of the Friars Minor appointed de Beaume as the Vicar General for this new reform of the friars, and as the canonical Visitor to the monasteries of the nuns.

De Beaume died at the Colettine monastery in Besançon in 1439. Abbess Colette made the decision to have his body buried in the chapter room of the monastery rather than in its chapel, not only out of her attachment to her longtime guide and support, but also to avoid the possibility of crowds being drawn to the tomb of a widely noted holy figure, which would have been disruptive to their lives. Though his cause has never been confirmed by the Holy See, he is honored within the Franciscan Order with the title of Blessed.

== Legacy ==
De Beaume wrote many letters and a range of spiritual treatises for the Colettine nuns, as well as a Rule for the Coletan friars. Possessing an intimate knowledge of his penitent's life, he wrote a brief account of her marvelous gifts. The saint, however, on hearing of its existence, caused it to be destroyed.

Among De Beaume's other writings is one on "Theologia Mystica", which had been mistakenly attributed to Saint Bonaventure, making him one of several Pseudo-Bonaventuran authors. On the other hand, several spiritual writings have been attributed to him in error. Now they have been identified as having been written by Hugo de Balma and Jacob of Milan, notably Hugo de Balma's De Triplici Via ad Sapientiam, Jacob of Milan's Stimulus Amoris and the Liber Soliloquiorum ad Impetrandam Gratiam et Lacrymas.

The Coletan friars were merged into the Observant branch of the Franciscans in 1517.
