= Enclosed religious orders =

Christian religious orders separated from the external world

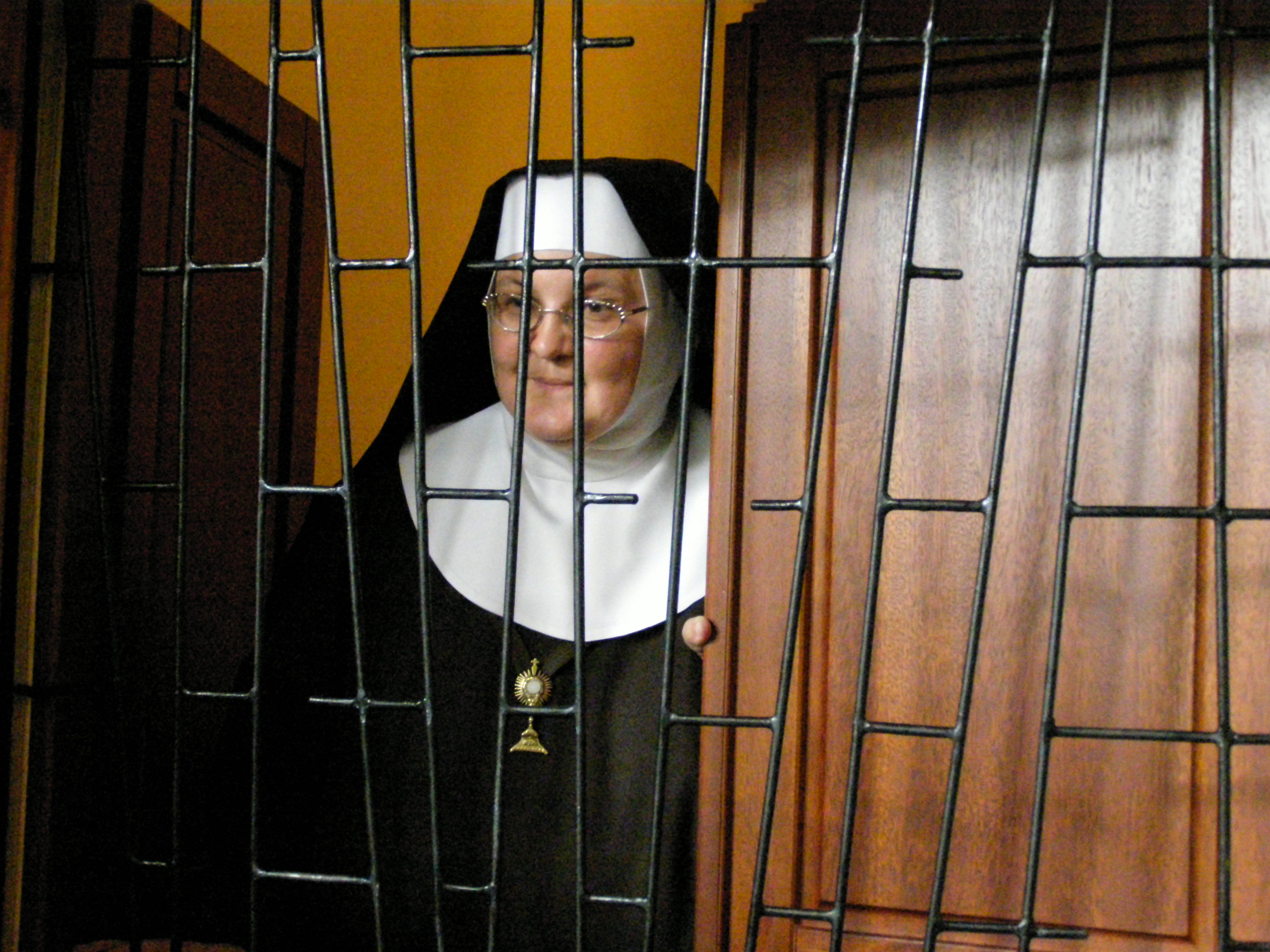
An enclosed nun of the Order of Saint Clare

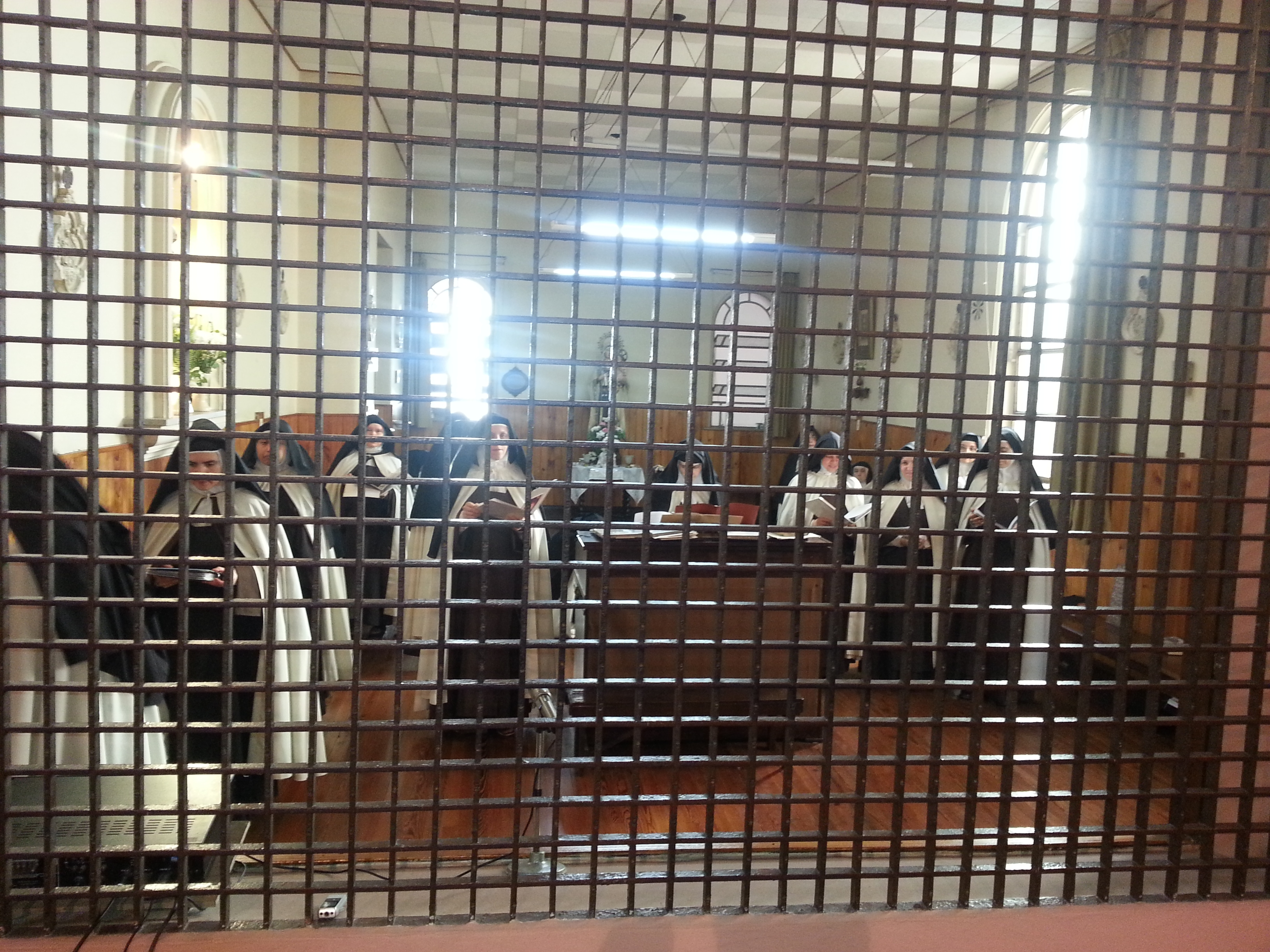
Discalced Carmelites convent of Santa Teresa de Jesús in Buenos Aires. Through the grille one can view into the choir.

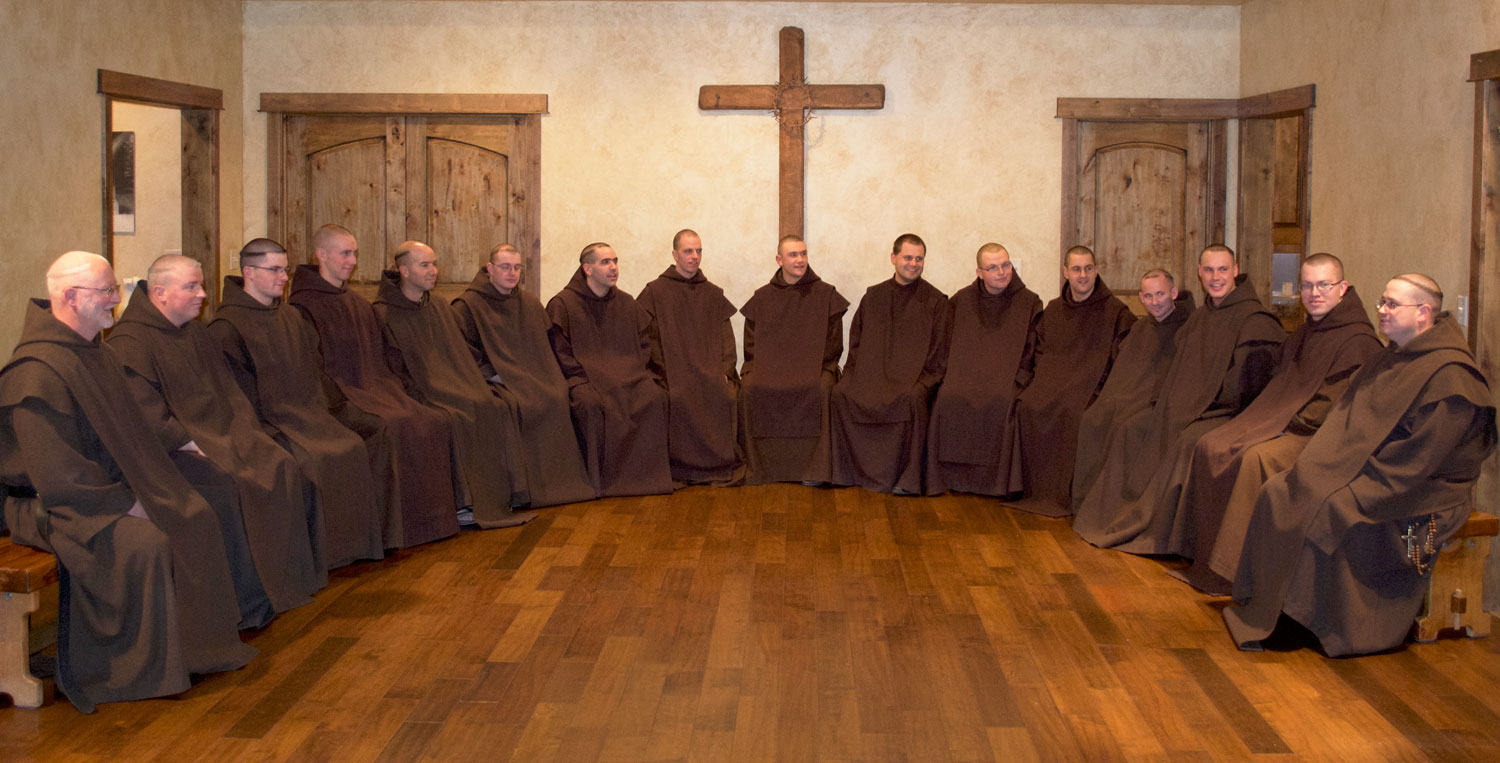
Monks of the Most Blessed Virgin Mary of Mount Carmel (the Carmelite monks)

Enclosed religious orders are religious orders whose members strictly separate themselves from the affairs of the external world. The term cloistered is synonymous with enclosed. In the Catholic Church, enclosure is regulated by the code of canon law, either the Latin code or the Oriental code, and also by the constitutions of the specific order. It is practised with a variety of customs according to the nature and charism of the community in question. This separation may involve physical barriers such as walls and grilles (that is, a literal cloister), with entry restricted for other people and certain areas exclusively permitted to the members of the convent. Outsiders may only temporarily enter this area under certain conditions (for example, if they are candidates for the order, doctors or craftsmen). The intended purpose for such enclosure is to prevent distraction from prayer and the religious life and to keep an atmosphere of silence.

Under certain circumstances, exceptions may be granted for enclosed men or women to leave the enclosure temporarily or permanently.

Enclosed religious orders of men include monks following the Rule of Saint Benedict, namely the Benedictine, the Cistercian, and the Trappist orders, but also monks of the Carthusians, Hieronymites, while enclosed religious orders of women include Canonesses Regular, nuns belonging to the Benedictine, Cistercian, Trappist, and the Carthusian orders, along with the nuns of the second order of each of the mendicant orders, including: the nuns of the Poor Clares, the Colettine Poor Clares, the Capuchin Poor Clares, the Dominicans, Carmelites and Discalced Carmelites, Servites, Augustinians, Minims, together with the Conceptionists, the Visitandines and the Ursulines.

== Contemplative orders ==
Contemplative orders prioritise worship and prayer over economic, pastoral or outreach activity. They exist in the Roman Catholic, Anglican and Eastern Orthodox traditions, as well as in Buddhist settings.

The English word monk most properly refers to men in monastic life, while the term friar more properly refers to mendicants active in the world (like Franciscans, Dominicans, and Augustinians), although not all monasteries require strict enclosure. Benedictine monks, for instance, have often staffed parishes and been allowed to leave monastery confines. Although the English word nun is often used to describe all Christian women who have joined religious institutes, strictly speaking, women are referred to as nuns only when they live in papal enclosure; otherwise, they are religious sisters. The distinctions between the Christian terms monk, nun, friar, Brother, and Sister are sometimes easily blurred because some orders (such as the Dominicans or Augustinians) include nuns who are enclosed, who are usually grouped as the Second Order of that movement, and religious sisters.

The Second Vatican Council's Decree on the Adaptation and Renewal of Religious Life (Perfectae Caritatis) stated that

Communities which are entirely dedicated to contemplation, so that their members in solitude and silence, with constant prayer and penance willingly undertaken, occupy themselves with God alone, retain at all times, no matter how pressing the needs of the active apostolate may be, an honorable place in the Mystical Body of Christ, whose "members do not all have the same function" (Romans 12:4).

== Exclaustration ==
In the Roman Rite of the Catholic Church, once a person has made solemn, perpetual religious vows, the release from these vows has to be approved by the ecclesiastical authorities. Normally there is a period of time, called exclaustration, in which the person lives outside the enclosure and the community and is exempt from the obligations of the consecrated life, such as prayer of the Liturgy of the Hours. Exclaustration of nuns must, in principle, be approved by the Holy See. Exclaustration can last up to five years under the 1983 Code of Canon Law. After this period the appropriate authority determines that the wish to leave a religious life is valid and grants release from their vows.

== See also ==
- Anchorite
- Cenobitic monasticism
- Hermit
