= Paul of the Cross =

Italian Roman Catholic saint

Saint Paul of the Cross CP
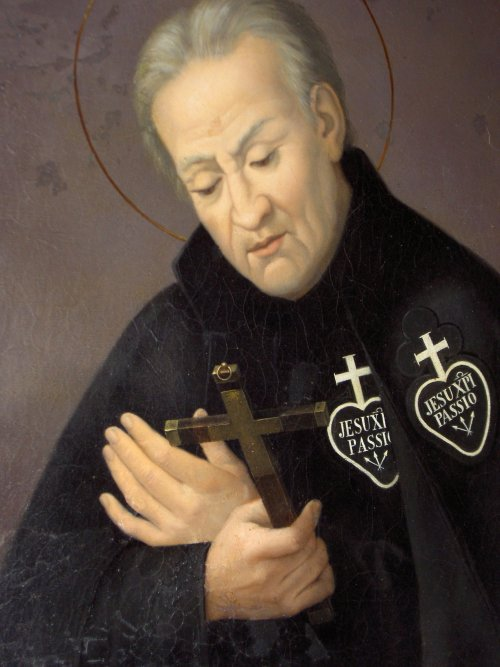
- Painting of St Paul of the Cross at the Retreat of Sant’Angelo, Vetralla, Italy

Priest, Founder, Mystic and Confessor
- Born: Paolo Francesco Danei; 3 January 1694; Ovada, Duchy of Savoy
- Died: 18 October 1775 (aged 81); Rome, Papal States
- Venerated in: Catholic Church
- Beatified: 1 May 1853 by Pope Pius IX
- Canonized: 29 June 1867 by Pope Pius IX
- Major shrine: Basilica of SS. Giovanni e Paolo, Rome, Italy
- Feast: 19 October; 20 October (United States); April 28 (Pre-1969 Calendar)
- Attributes: Passionist Habit, Crucifix

Paul of the Cross CP (Italian: San Paolo della Croce; born Paolo Francesco Danei; 3 January 1694 – 18 October 1775) was an Italian Catholic mystic, and founder of the Passionists.

== Biography ==
Paul of the Cross, originally named Paolo Francesco Danei, was born on 3 January 1694, in the town of Ovada, Piedmont, between Turin and Genoa in the Duchy of Savoy in northern Italy.

His parents were Luca and Anna Maria Massari Danei (sometimes spelled Daneii). His father ran a small dry-goods store, and moved his family and store from town to town near Genoa trying to make ends meet. Paul was the second of sixteen children, six of whom survived infancy; and learned at an early age the reality of death and the uncertainty of life. Paul received his early education from a priest who kept a school for boys, in Cremolino, Lombardy. He made great progress and at the age of fifteen he left school and returned to his home at Castellazzo. In his early years he taught catechism in churches near his home.

Paul experienced a conversion to a life of prayer at the age of 19. Influenced by his reading of the Treatise on the Love of God by Francis de Sales and the direction he received from priests of the Capuchin Order, it became his lifelong conviction that God is most easily found in the Passion of Christ.

In 1715, Paul left his work helping his father to join a crusade against the Turks who were threatening the Venetian Republic, but soon realized that the life of a soldier was not his calling. He returned to help in the family business. On his way home he stopped at Novello, where he helped an aging, childless couple until the end of 1716. They offered to make him their heir, but he declined. His uncle, Father Christopher Daneii, tried to arrange a marriage, but Paul had no plans to marry. When his uncle died, he kept for himself only the priest's Breviary.

When he was 26 years old, Paul had a series of prayer-experiences which made it clear to him that God was inviting him to form a community who would live an evangelical life and promote the love of God revealed in the Passion of Jesus. A legend tells that in a vision, he saw himself clothed in the habit he and his companions would wear. The first name Paul received for his community was "the Poor of Jesus"; later they came to be known as the Congregation of the Passion of Jesus Christ, or the Passionists.

With the encouragement of his bishop, who clothed him in the black habit of a hermit, Paul wrote the rule of his new community (of which he was, as yet, the only member) during a retreat of forty days at the end of 1720. The community was to live a penitential life, in solitude and poverty, teaching people in the easiest possible way how to meditate on the Passion of Jesus.

His first companion was his own brother, John Baptist. In the belief that it was necessary to reside in Rome in order to secure approval of the Rule, Paul and John Baptist accepted an invitation of Cardinal Corrandini to help establish a new hospital being founded by the Cardinal. The brothers devoted their energies to providing nursing care and ministered to the pastoral needs of both patients and staff.

After a short course in pastoral theology, the brothers were ordained to the priesthood by Pope Benedict XIII on 7 June 1727, in St. Peter's Basilica, Rome. After ordination they devoted themselves to preaching missions in parishes, particularly in remote country places where there were not a sufficient number of priests pastorally involved. Paul was known as one of the most popular preachers of his day, both for his words and for his generous acts of mercy. Their preaching apostolate and the retreats they gave in seminaries and religious houses brought their mission to the attention of others and gradually the community began to grow.

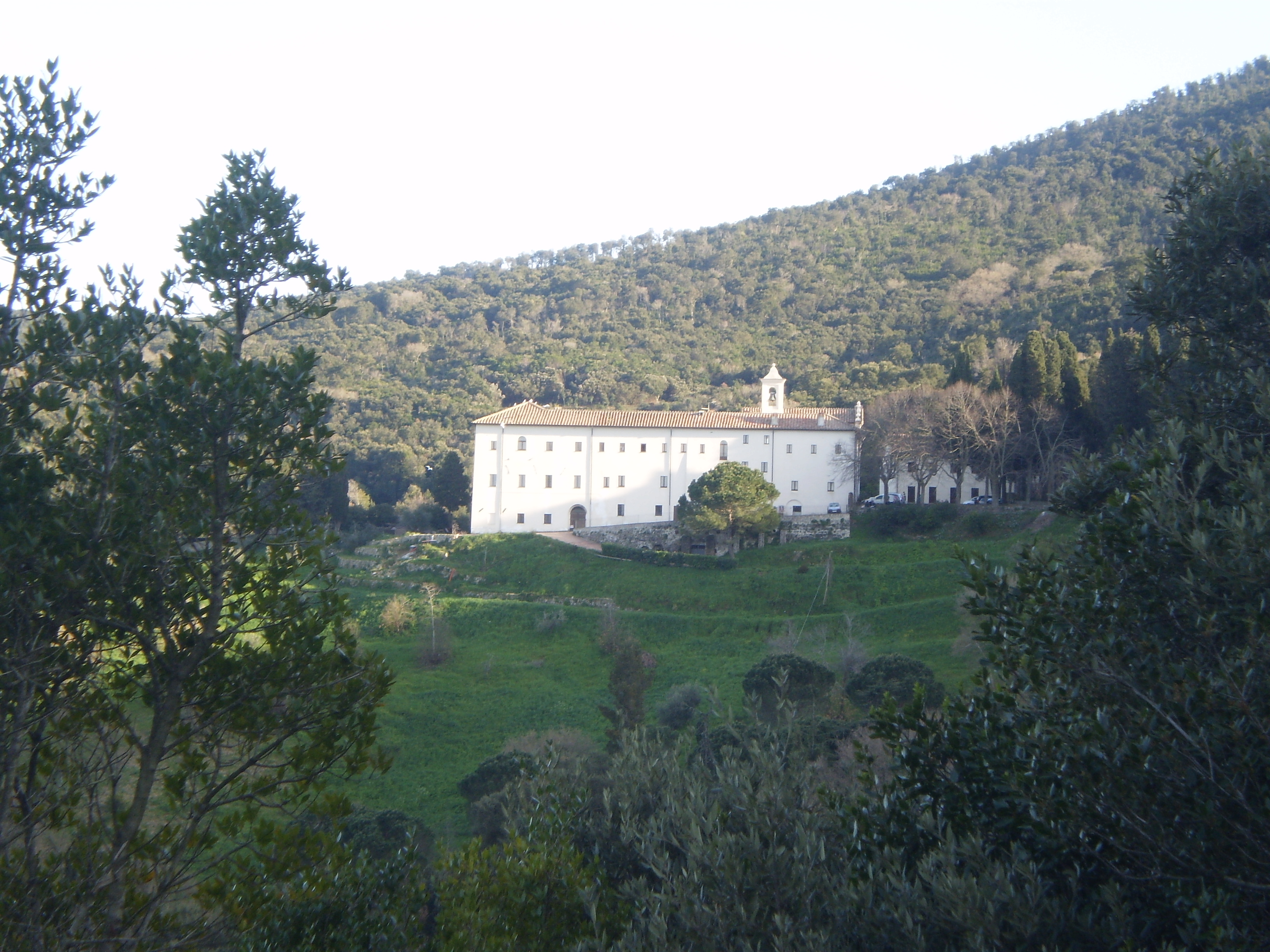
Monastery of the Presentation in Monte Argentario, Tuscany

The first Retreat (the name Passionists traditionally gave to their monasteries) was opened in 1737 on Monte Argentario (Province of Grosseto); the community now had nine members. Paul called his monasteries "retreats" to underline the life of solitude and contemplation which he believed was necessary for someone who wished to preach the message of the Cross. In addition to the communal celebration of the divine office, members of his community were to devote at least three hours to contemplative prayer each day. The austerity of life practised by the first Passionists did not encourage large numbers, but Paul preferred a slow, at times painful, growth to something more spectacular.

More than two thousand of his letters, most of them letters of spiritual direction, have been preserved.

He died on 18 October 1775, at the Retreat of Saints John and Paul (SS. Giovanni e Paolo). By the time of his death, the congregation founded by Paul of the Cross had one hundred and eighty fathers and brothers, living in twelve Retreats, mostly in the Papal States. There was also a monastery of contemplative nuns in Corneto (today known as Tarquinia), founded by Paul a few years before his death to promote the memory of the Passion of Jesus by their life of prayer and penance.

== Legacy ==
Paul of the Cross was beatified on 1 October 1852, and canonized on 29 June 1867 by Pope Pius IX. Two years later, his feast day was inserted in the Roman calendar, for celebration on 28 April as a Double. In 1962 it was reclassified as a Third-Class feast, and in 1969 it became an optional Memorial and was placed on 19 October, the day after the day of his death, 18 October, which is the feast of Saint Luke the Evangelist. His feast is celebrated in the United States on 20 October, as the US celebrates the feast of the North American Martyrs on 19 October.

His major shrine is the Basilica of Santi Giovanni e Paolo al Celio in Rome. San Paolo della Croce a Corviale is a titular church in Rome dedicated to Paul of the Cross and built in 1983. There are also churches named for him in Porto Ercole, Casone and Manduria.

== See also ==
- Flying saints
- Passionist nuns
