= Passionist nuns =

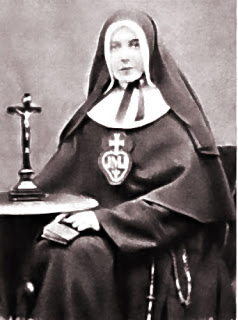
Habit of the Passionist nuns

The Passionist nuns are an order in the Roman Catholic Church. The nuns were the second Passionist order to be established, founded in 1771 by Paul of the Cross and Mary Crucified (Faustina Gertrude Constantini). The Passionist nuns are a cloistered, contemplative community.

== History ==
In the Life of St. Paul of the Cross by Vincent Strambi, evidence can be found of Paul of the Cross's intentions from the beginning of the Congregation of the Passion to found an institute in which women, consecrated to the service of God, could devote themselves to prayer and meditation on the Passion of Jesus. However, it was not until the end of Paul's life that he wrote the rules of this institution, which were approved by the brief of Clement XIV in 1770.

Mother Mary Crucified was born at Corneto in central Italy on 18 August 1713. In youth, she placed herself under the direction of St. Paul of the Cross, and became a Benedictine in her native city, awaiting the establishment of a Passionist convent. Through the generosity of her relatives, Dominic Costantini, his brother Nicolas, and his wife Lucia, a site was obtained for the first convent of the new institute in Corneto, and a suitable house and chapel were built.

On May 3 1771, Mother Mary Crucified, with the permission of Clement XIV and with ten postulants, was clothed in the habit of the Passionists and entered the first convent of Passionist nuns, solemnly erected by the vicar capitular of the diocese. Paul, detained by illness, was represented by the first consultor general of the order, Father John Mary. Mother Mary Crucified became the first mother superior of her order and remained so until her death in 1787.

With the approbation of Pius IX a house was established at Mamers in the Diocese of Le Mans, France, in 1872, and continued to flourish until suppressed with other religious communities in 1903 by the government. There is also a Passionist convent at Lucca.

On 5 May 1910, five Passionist nuns from Italy arrived in Pittsburgh to found a convent in the United States.

== Present day ==
The spirit of the institute and its distinctive character is devotion to the Passion of Christ. Passionist nuns make the vows of chastity, poverty, obedience, and enclosure. They also make an additional vow to promote devotion to and a grateful remembrance of the Passion of Christ. Their primary apostolate is prayer.

The nuns celebrate the Divine Office in common and spend the greater part of the day in prayer and other duties of piety. They attend to the domestic work of the convent, and occupy themselves in their cells with needlework, making vestments etc. Some communities support themselves by making altar breads. The order is present in eighteen countries.
