= Second order (religious) =

Catholic religious order for enclosed nuns

When referring to Roman Catholic religious orders, the term second order refers to those communities of contemplative cloistered nuns which are a part of the religious orders that developed in the Middle Ages.

== History ==
=== Dominican ===
In early thirteenth century, St. Dominic Guzman was a canon regular at the Cathedral of Osma in Spain. He accompanied his bishop on a trip to Denmark to arrange a marriage between the son of the King of Castile and a member of the Danish royal family. On the return trip, Dominic encountered the followers of the Duke of Albi in southern France. The Duke was a leading Cathar, which embraced a gnostic form of Christianity. Dominic undertook a preaching campaign to them, in order to bring them back to an orthodox understanding of the faith. Several women who responded to his preaching sought a completely new direction in their lives. In response to this, Dominic established a house for them in Prouille in 1206, where they could lead lives of prayer and penance.

In 1880, four nuns of the Dominican Sisters of Perpetual Adoration from the Monastery of the Blessed Sacrament in Oullins, France arrived in the Diocese of Newark, at the invitation of Bishop Michael Corrigan. By 1884, the Monastery of St. Dominic had been constructed based on Old World designs with an arched cloister, the traditional well, the vault resting-place of the departed, and the double grills separating them from the outer world. By 1889, Corrigan had become Archbishop of New York, and seven nuns from Newark re-located temporarily to establish Corpus Christi Monastery in Hunt's Point in the Bronx.

Today the Second Order of St. Dominic "...consists of cloistered nuns who take solemn vows of poverty, chastity, and obedience and dedicate themselves to a life of silence, prayer, and penance." They support themselves through intellectual, manual, and artistic work.

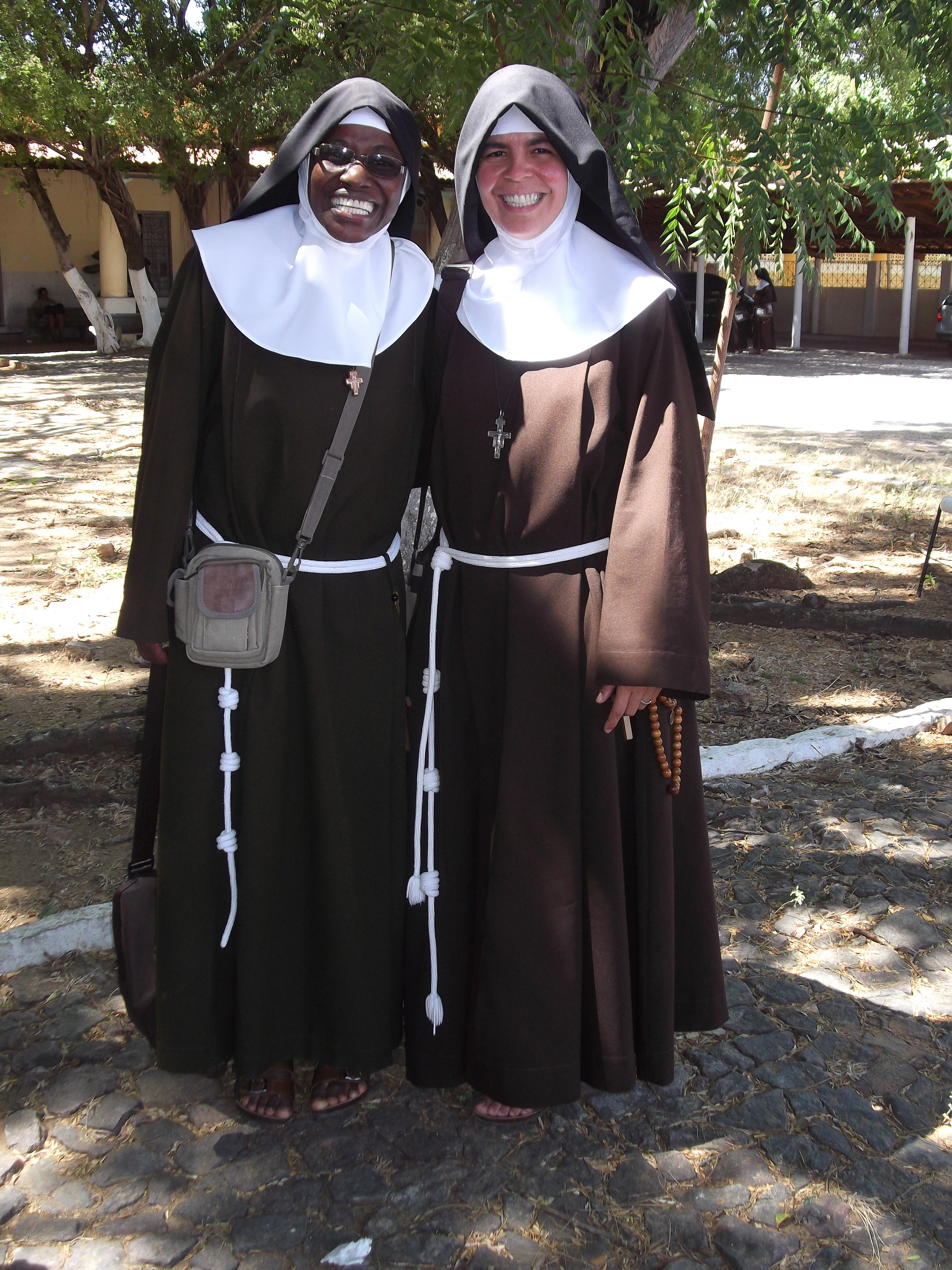
Poor Clares at Immaculate Conception Monastery, Feira de Santana, Brazil

=== Franciscan ===
St. Francis of Assisi began his life of preaching and penance in the Tuscan region of Italy around this same time. His preaching drew a young noblewoman of the city, the Lady Clare to be inspired to follow his way of life. Determined to take this step, Clare snuck out of her family's palace to join Francis and his brothers on the night of Palm Sunday 1211. After receiving her commitment and giving her the Franciscan habit, Francis then entrusted Clare to the care of a nearby community of Benedictine nuns for her training in monastic life. The Order that emerged from her commitment, originally called the "Poor Ladies of Assisi" and now known as the Poor Clares, took a form of monastic life committed to a strict life of poverty. The order includes many different monasteries of cloistered nuns professing the Rule of St. Clare.

=== Other groups ===
Benedictine nuns follow the Rule of Saint Benedict. The Second Order of St. Augustine was founded in 1264 and remained strictly cloistered until 1401.

While almost all Second Orders are those of cloistered, contemplative nuns, not all cloistered, contemplative communities are Second Orders. A number of such congregations were founded independent of any earlier congregation for men. These would include communities such as the Sisters Adorers of the Precious Blood and the Visitandines.

== Examples of second orders ==
- Founded in 1947, the Abbey of Regina Laudis was one of the first houses of contemplative Benedictine nuns in the United States.
- St. Mary's Abbey. located in Glencairn, County Waterford, Ireland, was founded in 1932. It is a Trappistine monastery, i.e., a branch of the Cistercians.
- The Passionist nuns were founded in Italy in 1771. They are the second Passionist order founded by Paul of the Cross. Our Lady of Sorrows Monastery was established in Pittsburgh in 1911.
- The Poor Clares are the second order of Franciscans. There is a Poor Clare Monastery in Hereford, England.
- The Collettines are a branch of the Poor Clares. The community of Poor Clare Colettine Nuns in Cleveland, Ohio is made up of both cloistered contemplative nuns dedicated to a life of prayer, and extern sisters who minister to the community's external needs.
- The Redemptoristines are the female counterpart to the Redemptorists. The nuns in Liguori, Missouri are located near the Redemptorist's monastery, St. Clement’s Health Care Center, and the Redemptorists' Media Center.

== See also ==
- Discalced Carmelites
- Augustinian nuns
- Servites
- Minims
- Mendicant Orders
