= Cum primum =

Cum primum may refer to:

- Cum primum, an apostolic constitution promulgated in 1566 by Pope Pius V.
- Cum Primum, an encyclical promulgated in 1759 by Pope Clement XIII.
- Cum primum, an encyclical promulgated in 1832 by Pope Gregory XVI.
