= Liberal Catholicism =

Liberal branch within the Catholic Church

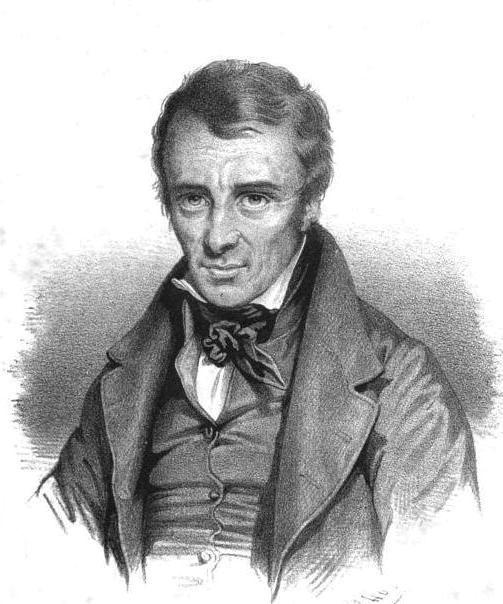
Félicité de La Mennais is considered the forerunner of liberal Catholicism.

Liberal Catholicism is a current of thought within the Catholic Church influenced by classical liberalism and promoting the separation of church and state, freedom of religion in the civic arena, expanded suffrage, and broad-based education. It was influential in the 19th century and the first half of the 20th, especially in France. It is largely identified with French political theorists such as Felicité Robert de Lamennais, Henri Lacordaire, and Charles Forbes René de Montalembert influenced, in part, by a similar contemporaneous movement in Belgium.

Being predominantly political in nature, liberal Catholicism as a movement was distinct from the contemporary theological movement of modernism. The movement is also distinct from the attitude of historical and present-day Catholics who are described as theologically progressive or liberal.

Elements of liberal Catholicism were repeatedly condemned by the pre–Vatican II Holy See, particularly in the encyclicals Mirari vos (1832) of Pope Gregory XVI, Quanta cura (1864) of Pope Pius IX, and the dogmatic constitution Pastor aeternus (1870) of the First Vatican Council. It was also vehemently criticized in the work Liberalism is a Sin by Félix Sardà y Salvany, published in 1884.

== Definition ==
Liberal Catholicism has been defined as "in essence a trend among sincere Catholics to exalt freedom as a primary value and to draw from this consequences in social, political, and religious life, seeking to reconcile the principles on which Christian France was founded with those that derived from the French Revolution". The phrase was used to describe the currents of thought and action that arose in the wake of Napoleon's remaking of Europe, and the restoration of traditional monarchies.

== History ==
=== Belgium ===
The National Congress of Belgium, an alliance between Roman Catholics and secular liberals on the basis of mutually recognized rights and freedoms, adopted in 1831 a constitution that enshrined several of the freedoms for which liberal Catholicism campaigned. The Congress Column in Brussels, erected in honour of the congress, has at its base four bronze statues that represent the four basic freedoms enshrined in the constitution: freedom of religion, freedom of association, education and freedom of the press. These four freedoms are also reflected in the names of the four streets that lead to the Place de la Liberté/Vrijheidsplein (Freedom Square) of Brussels: the Rue des Cultes/Eredienststraat (Religion Street), the Rue de l'Association/Verenigingsstraat (Association Street), the Rue de l'Enseignement/Onderrichtstraat (Education Street) and the Rue de la Presse/Drukpersstraat (Press Street). The constitution adopted almost all of Lamennais's proposals for the separation of church and state, granting the Catholic Church independence in church appointments and public activities, and almost complete supervision of Catholic education.

J.P.T Bury suggests that Lamennais and his associates found inspiration in a Belgian Liberal Catholic movement centered in Malines and led by Archbishop de Méan's vicar-general, Engelbert Sterckx. Largely Catholic Belgium seceded from the Netherlands in 1830 and established a constitutional monarchy. Sterckx, who became archbishop in 1832 found a way not merely to tolerate the new liberal constitution, but to expand the Church under the new liberties guaranteed.

At a noted Catholic congress in Malines, Belgium in 1863, Montalembert gave two long addresses on Catholic Liberalism, including "A Free Church in a Free State".

=== France ===
The movement of liberal Catholicism was initiated in France by Hugues Felicité Robert de Lamennais with the support of Jean-Baptiste Henri Lacordaire, Charles Forbes René de Montalembert and Olympe-Philippe Gerbet, Bishop of Perpignan, while a parallel movement arose in Belgium, led by François Antoine Marie Constantin de Méan et de Beaurieux, Archbishop of Mechelen, and his vicar general Engelbert Sterckx.

Lamennais founded the newspaper L'Ami de l'Ordre (precursor of today's L'Avenir), the first issue of which appeared on 16 October 1830, with the motto "God and Liberty". The paper was aggressively democratic, demanding rights of local administration, an enlarged suffrage, separation of church and state, universal freedom of conscience, freedom of education, freedom of assembly, and freedom of the press. Styles of worship were to be criticized, improved or abolished in absolute submission to the spiritual, not to the temporal authority.

On 7 December 1830, the editors articulated their demands as follows:

We firstly ask for the freedom of conscience or the freedom of full universal religion, without distinction as without privilege; and by consequence, in what touches us, we Catholics, for the total separation of church and state ... this necessary separation, without which there would exist for Catholics no religious freedom, implies, for a part, the suppression of the ecclesiastical budget, and we have fully recognized this; for another part, the absolute independence of the clergy in the spiritual order ... Just as there can be nothing religious today in politics there must be nothing political in religion. We ask, secondly, for freedom of education, because it is a natural right, and thus to say, the first freedom of the family; because there exists without it neither religious freedom nor freedom of expression.

With the help of Montalembert, Lammenais founded the Agence générale pour la défense de la liberté religieuse, which became a far-reaching organization with agents throughout France who monitored violations of religious freedom. As a result, the periodical's career was stormy and its circulation opposed by conservative bishops. In response, Lamennais, Montalembert and Lacordaire suspended their work and in November 1831 set out to Rome to obtain the approval of Pope Gregory XVI. Archbishop Quelen of Paris had warned Lammenais that he was being unrealistic and was viewed as a demagogue in favor of revolution. As Quelen was a Gallican, Lammenais ignored him.

Although pressured by the French government and the French hierarchy, Pope Gregory XVI would have preferred not to make an official issue of the matter. After much opposition, they gained an audience on 15 March 1832 only on condition that their political views should not be mentioned. The meeting was apparently cordial and uneventful. Prince Metternich, whose Austrian troops ensured the stability of the Papal States, pressed for a condemnation. The Pope's advisors were convinced that if he said nothing, it would viewed that he did not disapprove of Lamennais's opinions. Mirari vos was issued the following August, criticizing Lamennais's views without mentioning him by name.

After this, Lamennais and his two lieutenants declared that out of deference to the pope they would not resume the publication of L'Avenir and dissolved the Agence générale as well. Lamennais soon distanced himself from the Catholic Church, which was a blow to the credibility of the liberal Catholic movement, and the other two moderated their tone, but still campaigned for liberty of religious education and liberty of association.

They corresponded with Ignaz von Döllinger regarding their views on reconciling the Roman Catholic Church with the principles of modern society (liberalism); which views had aroused much suspicion in Ultramontane, mainly Jesuit-dominated, circles. In 1832 Lammenais and his friends Lacordaire and Montalembert, visited Germany, obtaining considerable sympathy in their attempts to bring about a modification of the Roman Catholic attitude to modern problems and liberal political principles.

=== Italy ===
Liberal Catholicism surfaced in early 19th century Italy among thinkers willing to reunite the Catholic doctrine with constitutional governace, civic freedoms and national unity. In 1819, Alessandro Manzoni published Observations on Catholic Morality (Osservazioni sulla morale cattolica), arguing that Catholic ethics supported civil liberty.

During the 1830s, priest and philosopher Antonio Rosmini wrote works such as On the Five Wounds of the Holy Church (Delle cinque piaghe della Santa Chiesa), it was written in 1832 and published in 1848. His works advocated for internal Church reforms and engagement with modern political concepts.

In 1843, Vincenzo Gioberti published On the Moral and Civil Primacy of the Italians (Del primato morale e civile degli Italiani), proposing Neo-Guelphism; a plan for Italian unification structured as a federation of states guided by the Pope. The June 1846 election of Pope Pius IX enhanced the support for the proposal, as the new Pope presented initial political reforms in the Papal States, which included amnesty (forgiveness) for political prisoners and reduced press censorship.

During the First Italian War of Independence in April 1848, Plus IX issued a statement declining to support the war against Austria. The Pope fled Rome in November 1848 following civil unrest. Returning to power in 1850, the Papacy rejected the liberal Catholic program and works written by Gioberti and Rosmini were placed on the Index of Forbidden Books.

As Italian unification was completed under the Kingdom of Italy between 1859 and 1870, Liberal Catholics were met with defiance from secular nationalists and Church authorities. In December 1864, Plus IX issued Quanta cura and the Syllabus of Errors, rejecting reunion with modern liberalism. After the annexation of Rome by Italian troops on September 20, 1870, the Papacy issued the Non Expedit decree in 1874, recommending Italian catholics to not participate in parliamentary elections.

== See also ==
- Americanism (heresy)
- Catholic social teaching
- Centesimus annus, an encyclical clarifying the Church's position on democracy
- Christian libertarianism
- Dignitatis humanae, the Second Vatican Council's declaration on religious freedom
