= L'Avenir (France) =

- Type: Daily newspaper
- Founded: October 16, 1830
- Ceased publication: November 15, 1831
- Political alignment: Liberal Catholicism
- Language: French
- Headquarters: 20 Rue Jacob, Paris
- Country: France

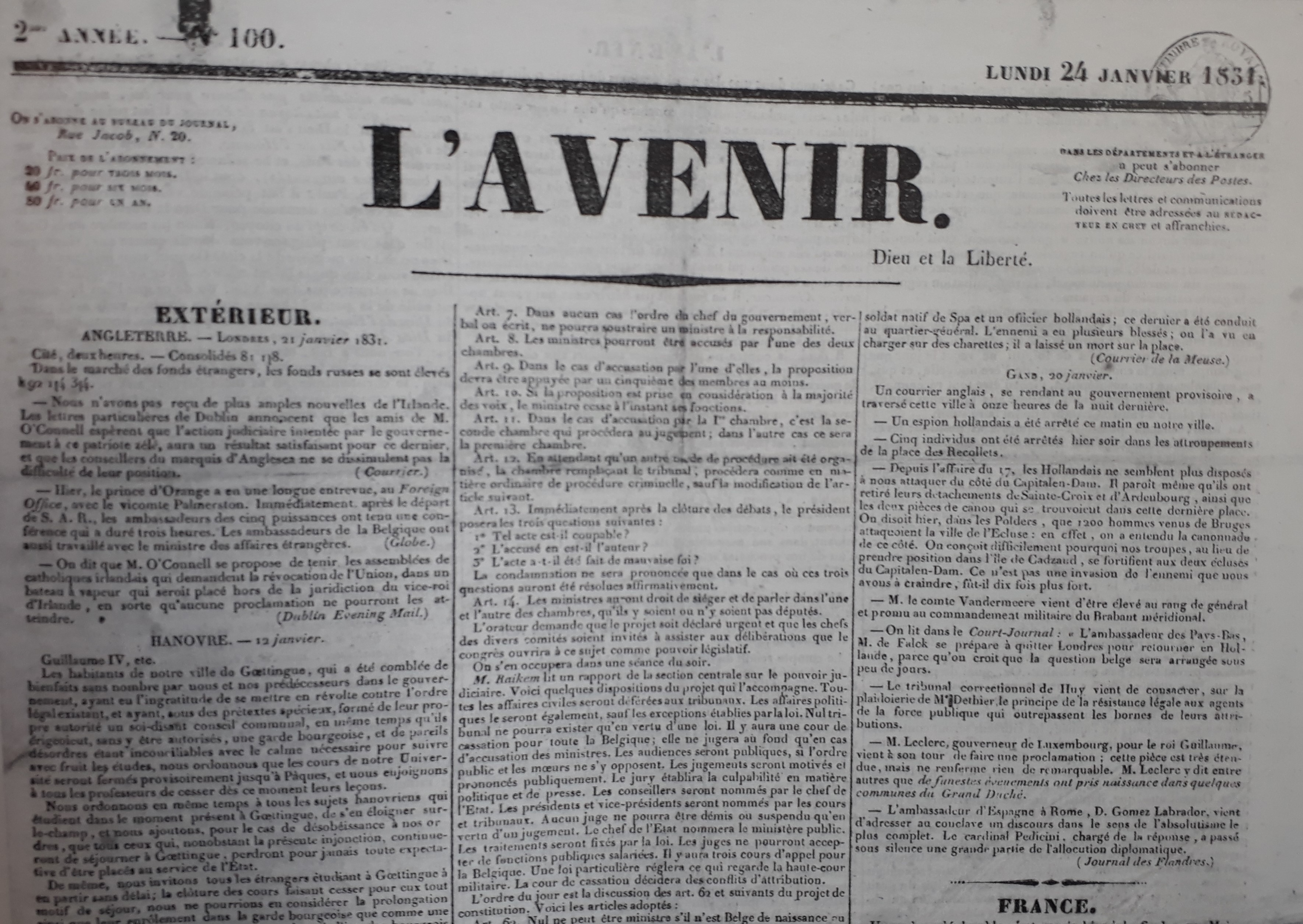
L'Avenir issue 100. Released Monday, January 24, 1831

L'Avenir was a daily newspaper published in France starting on October 16, 1830. A journal of opinion, its subtitle described it as a "political, scientific, and literary journal," with the motto "God and liberty." It defended the ideals of liberal Catholicism and was condemned by the papal encyclical Mirari vos. The publication was suspended by its authors on November 15, 1831, and did not resume afterward.

== Foundation of the newspaper ==
L'Avenir emerged during a highly anticlerical revolutionary period following the July Revolution of 1830, which established a bourgeois regime known as the July Monarchy. The revolution opposed the monarchical symbols of the Bourbon Restoration reminiscent of the Ancien Régime, as well as a Roman Catholic Church in France that was largely Legitimist, Gallican, and reactionary. The church was strongly tied to the Concordat of 1801, which intertwined the throne and altar.

The writers of L'Avenir sought to reconcile liberalism and democracy with Catholicism. Their motto, "God and liberty," underscored a commitment to separation of church and state, exalting papal sovereignty in spiritual matters and popular sovereignty in civil affairs.

A prospectus was published on August 14, 1830, announcing the creation of the newspaper to expand the mission of the Mémorial catholique. This prospectus was written by Philippe Gerbet, who spearheaded the project.

=== Revolutionary anticlerical context ===
After King Charles X issued the July Ordinances, dissolving the Chamber of Deputies and restricting press freedom, protests erupted. These culminated in the king's abdication and the ascension of Louis-Philippe I as king. This era of political change fostered an antireligious climate, with liberal and popular press denouncing a supposed "Catholic conspiracy." Acts of violence included the ransacking of Notre-Dame de Paris and the Archbishop's Palace, forcing Hyacinthe-Louis de Quélen, Archbishop of Paris, into hiding.

=== Early days of L'Avenir ===
In response to this hostility, Félicité de La Mennais decided to launch a new newspaper advocating for a liberal Catholic voice. The L'Avenir company was founded on September 8, 1830, with contributors including La Mennais, Gerbet, Charles de Coux, and Augustin Harel du Tancrel. The newspaper operated from Rue Jacob in Paris, with its first issue released on October 16, 1830.

Though modestly printed (circulation of around 1,500 copies), L'Avenir inspired enthusiasm among young romantics in France and abroad. Articles often tackled key issues such as freedom of education, separation of church and state, and solidarity with Catholics in Poland and Ireland.

== Editorial committee ==
The editorial committee included prominent liberal Catholic figures such as Henri Lacordaire, Charles de Montalembert, and René François Rohrbacher. Influenced by La Mennais, these contributors were disillusioned with the aristocratic society of the Restoration era. Writers like Chateaubriand and Victor Hugo expressed admiration for the publication, further cementing its intellectual significance.

== Ideas and objectives ==
L'Avenir advocated for the church's freedom from state control and total independence in spiritual matters, aligned with Ultramontanism. The editors also supported the freedom of the press, freedom of conscience, and freedom of education—the latter seen as essential for religious and intellectual liberty.

=== Focus on education ===
A major campaign of the newspaper was freedom of education. It opposed the state monopoly held by the University of France and called for the creation of independent Catholic schools. In 1831, the L'Avenir team founded a free school in Paris, which authorities soon shut down, leading to a legal battle.

== Challenges and closure ==
The newspaper faced financial difficulties, partly due to boycotts encouraged by conservative bishops. After just over a year of publication, L'Avenir ceased operation on November 15, 1831.

== Legacy ==
Despite its short lifespan, L'Avenir profoundly influenced liberal Catholic thought. Its legacy extended to initiatives like the Société de Saint-Vincent-de-Paul and later political movements advocating Catholic social teaching. Internationally, the journal inspired francophone publications, such as L'Avenir in Montreal, Canada, launched in 1847.

== Sources ==
- Milbach, Sylvain (2015). "Perspectives catholiques sur la révolution. L'Avenir de Lamennais". In Thomas Bouchet; Vincent Bourdeau; Edward Castleton; Ludovic Frobert; François Jarrige (eds.). Quand les socialistes inventaient l’avenir: Presse, théories et expériences, 1825-1860 (in French). Paris: La Découverte. pp. 62–74. ISBN 9782707185914.
