= Jean-Baptiste Henri Lacordaire =

French preacher (1802–1861)

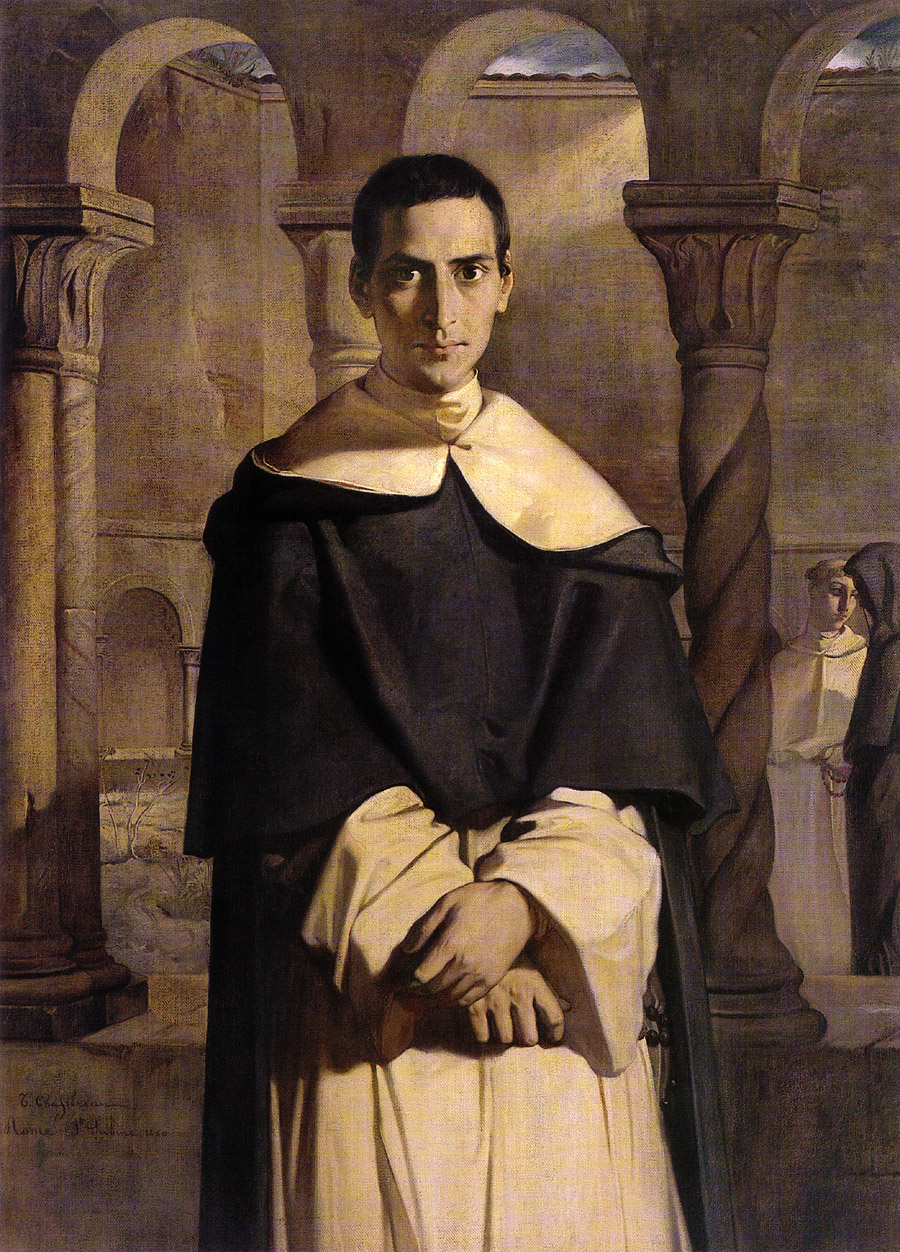
Henri-Dominique Lacordaire at the convent of Sainte-Sabine in Rome. Portrait of Dominique Lacordaire by Théodore Chassériau (1840), Musée du Louvre

Jean-Baptiste Henri-Dominique Lacordaire, OP (French: [ɑ̃ʁi dɔminik lakɔʁdɛʁ]; 12 May 1802 – 21 November 1861), often styled Henri-Dominique Lacordaire, was a French Catholic priest, journalist, theologian and political activist. He re-established the Dominican Order in post-Revolutionary France. Lacordaire was reputed to be the greatest pulpit orator of the nineteenth century.

== Early life and education ==
The son of a doctor in the French navy, Henri Lacordaire was born on 12 May 1802 at Recey-sur-Ource (Côte-d'Or) and raised in Dijon by his mother, Anne Dugied, the daughter of a lawyer at the Parliament of Bourgogne who was widowed at an early age, when her husband died in 1806. Henri had three brothers, one of whom was the entomologist Jean Théodore Lacordaire. He was raised as a Roman Catholic, but stopped actively practicing during his studies at the Dijon Lycée. He went on to study law. He distinguished himself in oratory at the Society of Studies in Dijon, a political and literary circle of the town's royalist youth. There he discovered the ultramontane theories of de Bonald, de Maistre, and Félicité de Lamennais. Under their influence he slowly lost his enthusiasm for the encyclopedists and Rousseau, though he maintained an attachment to Classical Liberalism and the revolutionary ideals of 1789.

In 1822 he left for Paris to complete his legal training. Although legally too young to plead cases, he was allowed to do so and he successfully argued several in the Court of Assizes, attracting the interest of the great liberal lawyer Berryer. However, he became bored and felt isolated in Paris and in 1824 he re-embraced Catholicism and soon decided to become a priest.

Thanks to the support of Monseigneur de Quélen, the Archbishop of Paris, who granted him a scholarship, he began studying at the Seminary of Saint-Sulpice in Issy in 1824 over the objections of his mother and friends. In 1826, he continued this education in Paris, which was generally mediocre. He wrote later that: "Those who remember having observed me at the seminary know that they have several times had the temptation of calling me mad." His seminary experience inspired Sainte-Beuve's novel Volupté.

At Saint-Sulpice, he met with Cardinal Rohan-Chabot, later archbishop of Besançon, who advised him to join the Society of Jesus. Nevertheless, after long hesitations by his superiors, he succeeded in being ordained a priest of the archdiocese of Paris on 22 September 1827. Shortly after his ordination he was offered the position of auditor of the rota at the court of Rome, an office which at once confers the title of monsignore, and is always a step to the episcopate, and often to a cardinal's hat; but he declined it peremptorily. He was appointed to a modest position as chaplain of a convent of nuns of the Order of the Visitation. In the following year, he was named second chaplain of the Lycée Henri-IV. This experience convinced him of the inevitable de-Christianization of French youth educated in public institutions.

== Lamennais, Montalembert, L'Avenir and liberal Catholicism ==
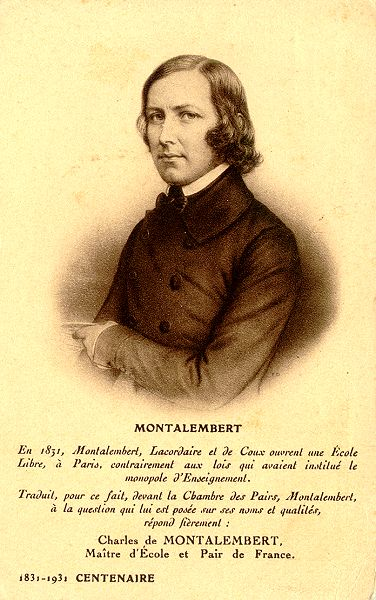
Charles Forbes René de Montalembert

Discouraged, when Bishop John Dubois of New York came to Paris to recruit missionaries for the United States, Lacordaire volunteered and was granted permission, but the revolutionary events of 1830 kept him in France. He visited Father Hugues Felicité Robert de Lamennais. Lacordaire had long resisted the views of Father Lamennais, one of the leading intellectuals concerned with French Catholic youth, but in May 1830, Lamennais converted him to his liberal version of ultramontanism, that is, the adherence to the absolute universal authority of the papacy in opposition to nationalist and secularist ideas.

He, Lamennais, Olympe-Philippe Gerbet, and the young Viscount Charles de Montalembert, who became one of his closest friends, allied themselves with the July Revolution. They demanded the integral application of the Charter of 1830 and voiced support of foreign liberal revolutions in Poland, Belgium and Italy. Together they launched the newspaper L'Ami de l'Ordre (precursor of L'Avenir) on 16 October 1830, whose motto was "Dieu et la Liberté!" ("God and Freedom!"). In that largely anti-clerical and revolutionary context, the journal sought to synthesize ultramontanism and liberalism to reconcile democratic aspirations and Roman Catholicism.

On 7 December 1830, the editors of "L’Avenir" articulated their demands as follows:

We firstly ask for the freedom of conscience or the freedom of full universal religion, without distinction as without privilege; and by consequence, in what touches us Catholics, for the total separation of church and state... this necessary separation, without which there would exist for Catholics no religious freedom, implies, for a part, the suppression of the ecclesiastical budget, and we have fully recognized this; for another part, the absolute independence of the clergy in the spiritual order... Just as there can be nothing religious today in politics there must be nothing political in religion.

Their other demands included freedom of the press, freedom of association, and the extension of electoral suffrage.

He was especially vehement in demanding the separation of Church and State. To this end, he called on French priests to refuse the salary which was paid them by the government, advocating for the embrace of apostolic poverty by the clergy. On 15 November 1830, he expressed himself: "We are preyed upon by our enemies, by those who regard us as hypocrites or as imbeciles, and by those who are persuaded that our life depends on money... Freedom is not given, it is taken." These demands, along with numerous attacks against bishops appointed by the new government, whom he characterized as ambitious and servile, provoked a scandal in the French episcopate, which was largely Gallican (i.e., conciliarist, nationalist, royalist, asserting the authority of the local episcopacy, and opposed to papal absolutism) and conservative. The virulence of "L’Avenir," and particularly of Lamennais and Lacordaire, provoked the French Bishops to form a tribunal against the editors of the periodical. Lamennais and Lacordaire spent January 1831 before the court, and obtained a triumphal acquittal.

Lacordaire believed that state control of education compromised religious instruction, especially in colleges, and that most students lost their faith upon leaving school. He was against the government's monopoly of the universities, and opposed Montalivet, the minister of public education and faith. On 9 May 1831 Lacordaire and Montalembert opened a free school, rue des Beaux-Arts, which was shut down by the police two days later. At a trial which took place in front of the Chambre des Pairs (Chamber of Peers) Lacordaire defended himself, but failed to prevent the permanent closure of the school.

The editors of "L’Avenir" founded in December 1830 the General Society for the defense of religious freedom. "L’Avenir" was suspended by its founders on 15 November 1831 while Lacordaire, Lamennais and Montalembert, the "Pilgrims of Freedom," went to Rome to seek recourse to Pope Gregory XVI, to whom they hoped to present a dissertation composed by Lacordaire. At first confident, they fast became disenchanted by the reserved welcome with which they were received. On 15 August 1832, the Pope, without naming them, condemned their ideas in the encyclical Mirari vos, most notably their demands for freedom of conscience and freedom of the press. Even before this condemnation, Lacordaire distanced himself from his companions, and returned to Paris where he took up again his functions as a chaplain at the Convent of Visitations.

On 11 September, he published a letter of submission to the Pope's judgment. He then successfully used all his force of persuasion to convince Montalembert, who at first remained recalcitrant, to imitate him in his submission. In 1834 he also challenged Lamennais, who rather than accept what he saw as Rome's reactionary absolutism, publicly renounced his priesthood and published "Les Paroles d’un Croyant" (Words of a Believer,) a vociferous republican polemic against the established social order, denouncing what he now saw as the conspiracy of kings and priests against the people. Pope Gregory responded quickly, calling Lammenais' new book "small in size, but immense in perversity." He promulgated the encyclical "Singulari Nos" (15 July 1834) condemning its contents. Most commentators see this episode as effectively squelching of the open expression of modernist ideas in Catholic circles, until at least the papacy of Leo XIII at the end of the century. Lacordaire, for his part, then further distanced himself from Lammenais, expressed his disappointment at the consequences of the Revolution of 1830, and proclaimed his continued faithfulness to the Church of Rome. He condemned the pride of Lamennais and charged him with Protestantism, accusing him of having wanted to place the authority of the human race above that of the Church.

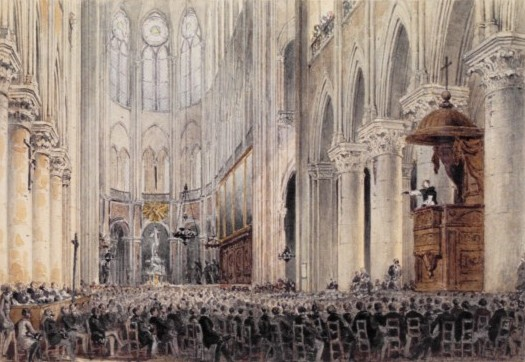
Lacordaire preaching his Lenten Conferences from the elevated pulpit at Notre-Dame Cathedral, Paris, 1845.

== Preaching ==
In January 1833 he met Madame Swetchine, who was to become a significant moderating influence upon him. She was a Russian convert to Catholicism who had a famous salon in Paris which Montalembert, the Earl of Falloux, and Lamennais also frequented. He developed a friendly filial relationship with her through an extensive correspondence.

In January 1834, at the encouragement of the young Frédéric Ozanam, the founder the Society of Saint Vincent de Paul (a charitable organization,) Father Lacordaire started a series of lectures at the Collège Stanislas. This met with great success, even beyond his students. His thematic emphasis on freedom provoked his critics, who charged him with perverting the youth. Lacordaire was reputed to be the greatest pulpit orator of the nineteenth century. Lacordaire's preaching was not so much penitential as an exercise in apologetics. He demonstrated that one could be a French citizen and a Catholic. The lectures were a great success.

Monseigneur de Quélen, the Archbishop of Paris, asked Lacordaire to preach a Lenten series in 1835 at the Cathedral of Notre-Dame in Paris, as part of the Notre-Dame Lectures specially aimed at the catechesis of Christian youth, which had been inaugurated at the behest of his friend Ozanam. Lacordaire's first lecture took place on 8 March 1835, and was met with wide acclaim. The social event of its day, 6,000 attended. Because of this immediate success, he was asked to preach again the following year. According to Thomas Bokenkotter, Lacordaire's Notre Dame Conferences, "...proved to be one of the most dramatic events of nineteenth century church history." Today the Lacordaire Notre-Dame Lectures, which mixed theology, philosophy and poetry, are still acclaimed as a sublime modern re-invigoration of traditional homiletics.

Among those who attended his Lenten sermons in 1836 was Marie-Eugénie de Jésus de Milleret. The encounter with Lacordaire marked a turning point in her life and the beginning of a spiritual journey that would eventually lead her to found the Religious of the Assumption. In a letter written to Lacordaire years later, she recalled, "Your words gave me a faith which henceforth nothing could shake."

But in 1836 after such considerable success, he was still the object of mounting attacks on his theological stance. Suddenly his mother died. Lacordaire, aware of the need to continue his theological studies, retreated to Rome to study with the Jesuits. There, he published his "Letter on the Holy See" in which he reaffirmed with vigor his ultramontane positions, insisting on the primacy of the Roman Pontiff, "the one and permanent trustee, supreme organ of the Gospel, and the sacred source of the universal communion." This text ran afoul of the Archbishop of Paris, Monseigneur Quélen, who was a sincere Gallican.

== Re-establishment of the Dominican Order in France ==
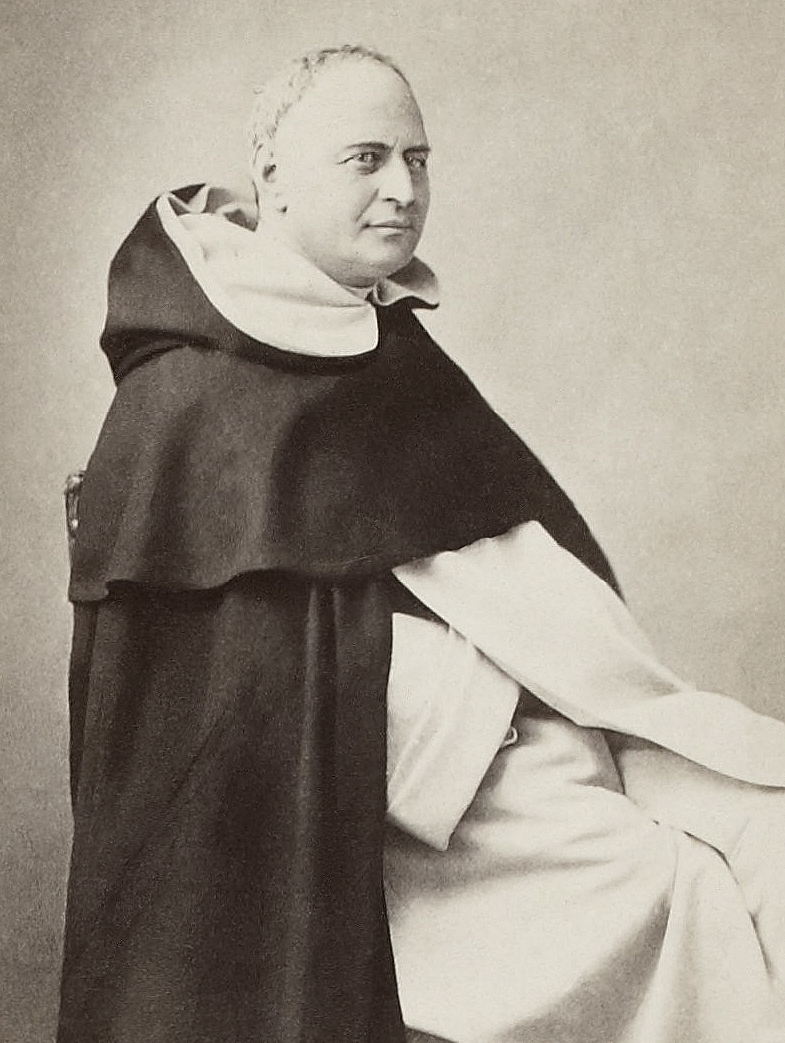
Lacordaire, ca.1855

In 1837, seeing the example of Guéranger's restoration of the Benedictines, Lacordaire decided to enter the Dominican Order despite the loss of certain personal freedoms that would entail, and to re-establish the Dominicans in France.

Pope Gregory XVI and the general master of the Dominicans, Father Ancarani, supported his plan, the latter providing the Roman convent of Santa Sabina to serve as a novitiate for French Dominicans. In September 1838, Lacordaire returned to France to identify candidates for the novitiate as well as financial and political support. He published an eloquent announcement in the journal L’Univers. He argued that religious orders were compatible with the principles of the Revolution, particularly because of the democratic structure of the Dominicans. He represented the vow of poverty as a radical application of the revolutionary ideas of égalité and fraternité.

On 9 April 1839, Lacordaire formally joined the Dominicans at the convent of Santa Maria sopra Minerva in Rome and received the name Dominic. He took final vows on 12 April 1840. In 1841, he returned to France wearing the illegal Dominican habit. On 14 February 1841, he preached in Paris at Notre-Dame. He then founded several convents, starting in Nancy in 1843. In April 1844 Lacordaire obtained permission to purchase the former Carthusians monastery of Notre-Dame de Châlais and establish a Dominican novitiate. The religious painter Hyacinthe Besson was appointed the first Master of the novices. In 1849 he established a house of studies in Paris. He also exerted an important influence on Jean-Charles Prince and Joseph-Sabin Raymond, two Canadians who took the Dominican Order to Canada.

In 1850, the Dominican Province of France was officially re-established under his direction and he was elected provincial superior, but Pope Pius IX named Alexandre Jandel, a philosophical opponent of Lacordaire, vicar general of the order. Jandel held a severe interpretation of Dominican medieval constitutions and was opposed to Lacordaire's more liberal vision. A dispute about setting the hours for prayer in the priories erupted in 1852. Lacordaire preferred lax enforcement of the timetable in deference to other functions like preaching and teaching. In 1855 the pope supported Jandel by naming him general master of the Order. Lacordaire, after a time without administrative duties, was re-elected head of the French province in 1858.

== Final years ==
Both political controversies and disputes within the Dominican order clouded Lacordaire's later years. Long hostile to the July Monarchy, he supported the Revolution of 1848. With Frédéric Ozanam and the Abbot Maret, he launched a newspaper, L'Ère Nouvelle (The New Era), to campaign for the rights of Catholics under the new regime. Their program mixed traditional Liberal Catholicism's defense of the freedom of conscience and education with Ozanam's Social Catholicism. Lacordaire was elected to the Assemblée Nationale from the Marseille region. Favoring the Republic, he sat on the extreme left of the Assemblée, but resigned on 17 May 1848, following workers' riots and the invasion of the Assemblée Nationale by demonstrators on 15 May. He preferred to retire rather than take sides in what he expected would be a civil war between extreme partisans. When L'Ère Nouvelle endorsed ever more socialist policies, he left the paper's leadership on 2 September, while continuing to support it.

Lacordaire supported the Revolutions of 1848 in the Italian states and the later French invasion of the Papal States: "We must not at all be too alarmed by the possible fall of Pius IX," he wrote to Montalembert. He found the Falloux Laws a disappointment despite their attempt to establish a degree of freedom for Catholic secondary education. Opposed to the election of Louis-Napoléon Bonaparte, Lacordaire condemned his coup d’état of 2 December 1851. He retired from public life, and later explained: "My hour had come to disappear with the others. Many Catholics followed another line, and separating themselves from all they had said and done, threw themselves with ardor before absolute power. This schism that I do not want at all to call here an apostasy, has always been a great mystery to me and a great sadness."

In quasi-retirement, he dedicated himself to the education of youth as permitted by the Falloux Laws. In July 1852 he accepted the leadership of a school in Oullins, near Lyon, then a similar role at the school of Sorèze in Tarn in 1854. Finally, on 2 February 1860, he was elected to the Académie française, filling the seat of Alexis de Tocqueville, whose eulogy he had delivered. His election represented a protest by the Académie and Catholic sympathizers against Napoléon III, who had conceded to allowing the Italian states of Florence, Midena, Parma, and Bologna to withdraw from the Papal States and ally themselves with independent Piedmont. Encouraged by opponents of the Imperial Regime, supported by Montalembert and Berryer, he agreed that he would not criticize Napoléon III's intervention in Italian politics. His reception at the Académie was therefore not controversial.

About this time he uttered his famous epitaph: "J'espère mourir un religieux pénitent et un libéral impénitent." ("I hope to die a penitent religious man and an unrepentant liberal.")

Lacordaire only sat once at the Académie. He died at the age of 59 on 21 November 1861 in Sorèze (Tarn) and was buried there.

=== Modern reception ===
The liberal catholicism propagated by Lacordaire and others was viewed negatively by the Holy See. In Mirari vos (1832) the pope condemned the freedom of the press and the demand for the liberty of conscience for catholics: 'This shameful font of indifferentism gives rise to that absurd and erroneous proposition which claims that liberty of conscience must be maintained for everyone. It spreads ruin in sacred and civil affairs, though some repeat over and over again with the greatest impudence that some advantage accrues to religion from it.'

The later encyclyclical Singulari Nos of 1834 summoned Lamennais and his followers to renounce the radical views he developed against temporal and spiritual sovereignties. This hostility all played out around the same time that the dogma of papal infallibility was defined (1870).

The hostile view of Liberal Catholicism lessened during the Second Vatican Council. When Pope Paul VI promulgated the encyclical Dignitatis Humanae the church took back ‘the rights of truth’ doctrine and allowed for the assertion that humans have the right to have freedom of conscience and freedom of religion. Modern Catholic scholarship and literature tends to look more favorable on the l’Avenir movement and the views of liberal catholicism.

Recent scholarship on 19th century church history tends to focus more on the broad developments of liberal catholicism and the developments surrounding the Second Vatican Council. At the council the separation between church and state and the liberty of conscience was confirmed. Lacordaire and the former members of the L'avenir are now recognized as being part of a bigger intellectual current which recent scholarship has more attention for.

== Quotes ==
- "Entre le fort et le faible, entre le riche et le pauvre, entre le maître et le serviteur, c’est la liberté qui opprime et la loi qui affranchit."
  - (Translated: "Between the strong and the weak, between the rich and the poor, between the lord and the slave, it is freedom which oppresses and the law which sets free.")
- "Ce n'est pas génie, ni gloire, ni amour qui reflète la grandeur de l'âme humaine; c'est bonté."
  - ("It is not genius, nor glory, nor love that reflects the greatness of the human soul; it is kindness.")
- "Les mots de la liberté sont grands chez un peuple qui n’en connaît pas la mesure."
  - (Translated: The words of freedom are large among a people who do not know its extent.)

== Works ==
His most influential publication was a collection of his Conférences de Nôtre Dame de Paris.

=== French ===
- Eloges funèbres, Quebec: Libraire Ecclesiastique de J. et O. Cremazie, 1845.
- "Lettre sur le Saint-Siège"
- Considérations sur le système philosophique de M. de Lamennais, Paris: Derivaux Libraire, 1834.
- De la liberté d'Italie et de l'Eglise, Paris: Vve. Poussielgue-Rusand, 1860.
- "Conferences" (tr. vol. I only, London, 1851)
- "Dieu et l'homme" in "Conférences de Notre Dame de Paris" (tr. London, 1872)
- "Jésus-Christ" (tr. London, 1869)
- "Dieu" (tr. London, 1870)
- Mélanges, Paris: Poussielgue Frères, 1872.
- Henri Perreyve, ed., Letters, 8 vols. (1862), tr. Derby, 1864, revised and enlarged ed. London, 1902

=== English ===
- Life: Conferences delivered at Toulouse, New York: P. O'Shea, 1875.
- Jesus Christ: God; God and the Man; Conferences Delivered at Notre Dame in Paris, London: Chapman & Hall, 1884.
- Letters to Young Men, London: Art & Book Co., 1902.
- Thoughts and Teachings of Lacordaire, London: Art and Book Co., 1902.

Lacordaire, Life of (Foisset, 2 vols.) Lacordaire, Life of (d'Aussonville) Lacordaire Orator and Monk (Beaudé) Lacordaire: Life of St. Mary Magdalene

== Sources ==
- Edward McSweeny, "Lacordaire on Property," The Catholic World, Vol. 45 (1887).
- Lear, Henrietta Louisa Sydney (1870). A Dominican Artist. Nobel Press. ISBN 978-5-87677-930-4.
- Margaret Oliphant, "Henri Lacordaire," Blackwood's Magazine, Vol. 93 (1863).
- Harrison, C.E. (2016). Romantic Catholics: France's postrevolutionary generation in search of a modern faith.
- Peter M. Batts, Henri-Dominique Lacordaire's Re-Establishment of the Dominican Order in Nineteenth-Century France, The Edwin Mellen Press, 2004
- Peter M. Batts, "Jean-Baptiste Henri Lacordaire" in New Catholic Encyclopedia (2003)
- Thomas Bokenkotter, Church and Revolution: Catholics and the Struggle for Democracy and Social Justice (NY: Doubleday, 1998)
- T.B. Scannell, "Jean-Baptiste-Henri Dominique Lacordaire" in The Catholic Encyclopedia (1910)
