= Domingo Aracena =

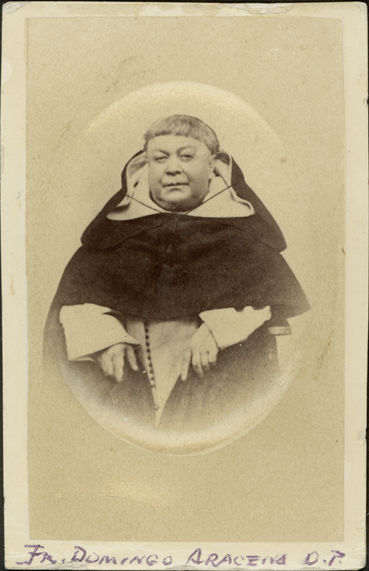
- Born: February 15, 1810; Santiago
- Died: March 3, 1874 (aged 64)

Domingo Aracena Baigarri O.P. (February 15, 1810 – March 3, 1874) was a Chilean Dominican friar and scholar.

Domingo Aracena was born on February 15, 1810 in Santiago, Chile. He was educated at the school of the Dominicans in Santiago, and entered the novitiate of the order at the age of fifteen. He afterward learned Hebrew, Greek, and the principal modern languages, and attracted so much attention in his public discussions that he was known as the Pico de la Mirandola of Chile. During the twenty years that he was professor in his convent his knowledge of jurisprudence was so highly esteemed that he was constantly visited by lawyers and statesmen, as well as by successive presidents, who consulted him on difficult points of constitutional law. It is said by his biographers that several changes in the laws of Chile were brought about by his advice. He wrote several works, one of which, Vindicacion de la nota de Inquisidores, has been translated into French by Lacordaire.

Domingo Aracena died on March 3, 1874, in Santiago.
