= Singulari Nos =

1834 encyclical by Pope Gregory XVI

Singulari Nos Latin for 'Us in particular' Encyclical of Pope Gregory XVI
- Signature date: 25 June 1834
- Subject: Lammenais' writings
- Number: 5 of 9 of the pontificate
- Text: In English

Singulari Nos (subtitled On the Errors of Lammenais) was an encyclical issued on June 25, 1834, by Pope Gregory XVI. Essentially a follow-up to the better-known Mirari vos of 1832, Singulari Nos focused strongly on the views of French priest Felicité Robert de Lamennais, who did not see any contradiction between Catholicism and the new ideals of liberalism and the separation of church and state.

== Background ==
In October 1830, Lamennais, Jean-Baptiste Henri Lacordaire, and Charles Forbes René de Montalembert founded the newspaper, L'Avenir, which advocated an enlarged suffrage, separation of church and State, universal freedom of conscience, instruction, assembly, and the press, views were opposed by the French bishops. Despite being warned by Archbishop Quelen of Paris that their expectations were unrealistic, they sought support from Pope Gregory XVI.

Although pressured by the French government and the French hierarchy, Pope Gregory XVI would have preferred not to make an official issue of the matter. John Henry Newman described the situation in Rome at that time:

The French Revolution in July, 1830, had been followed in no long time by insurrection within the papal territories; Austria intervened to reduce the revolting cities; and France took possession of Ancona to keep Austria in check. These events placed the Sovereign Pontiff between two opposite dangers; his fears from France are intelligible enough; Austria, on the other hand, had always been supposed to covet the portion of the pontifical states on the north of the Apennines; and the suspicion had been so strong in Rome, in 1821, that the government had not allowed the Austrian forces to pass through the city on their way to Naples. Whilst then the Pope was in this unpleasant dilemma, Russia, according to M. de la Mennais, stepped in and offered her aid. She alleged that she could not possibly have any interested views as regards the Italian peninsula, either revolutionary or ambitious, and she offered to place a force at the Pope's disposal to defend him against all emergencies. In return she did but ask, that the Pope would take the part of the Autocrat against Poland, and instruct the Polish Roman bishops accordingly. The offer was accepted on the specified condition.

Newman noted, "Nothing can be more discordant, less capable of a common measure, than a question of abstract religious truth, and a question of practice and matter of fact, in relation to the measures to be pursued by one secular power towards another; as discordant was the position of the Pope with that of the conductors of the Avenir."

In August 1832, Gregory issued the encyclical Mirari vos. General in scope, it upheld clerical celibacy, and raised concerns over excessively close alliances between the clergy and government. It denounced those who advocated divorce and secret societies that sought overturn the legitimate governments of the Italian states. It also denounced Lemannais's views without specifically naming him. The encyclical satisfied neither Lamennais's supporters nor his detractors.

=== Paroles d'un croyant ===
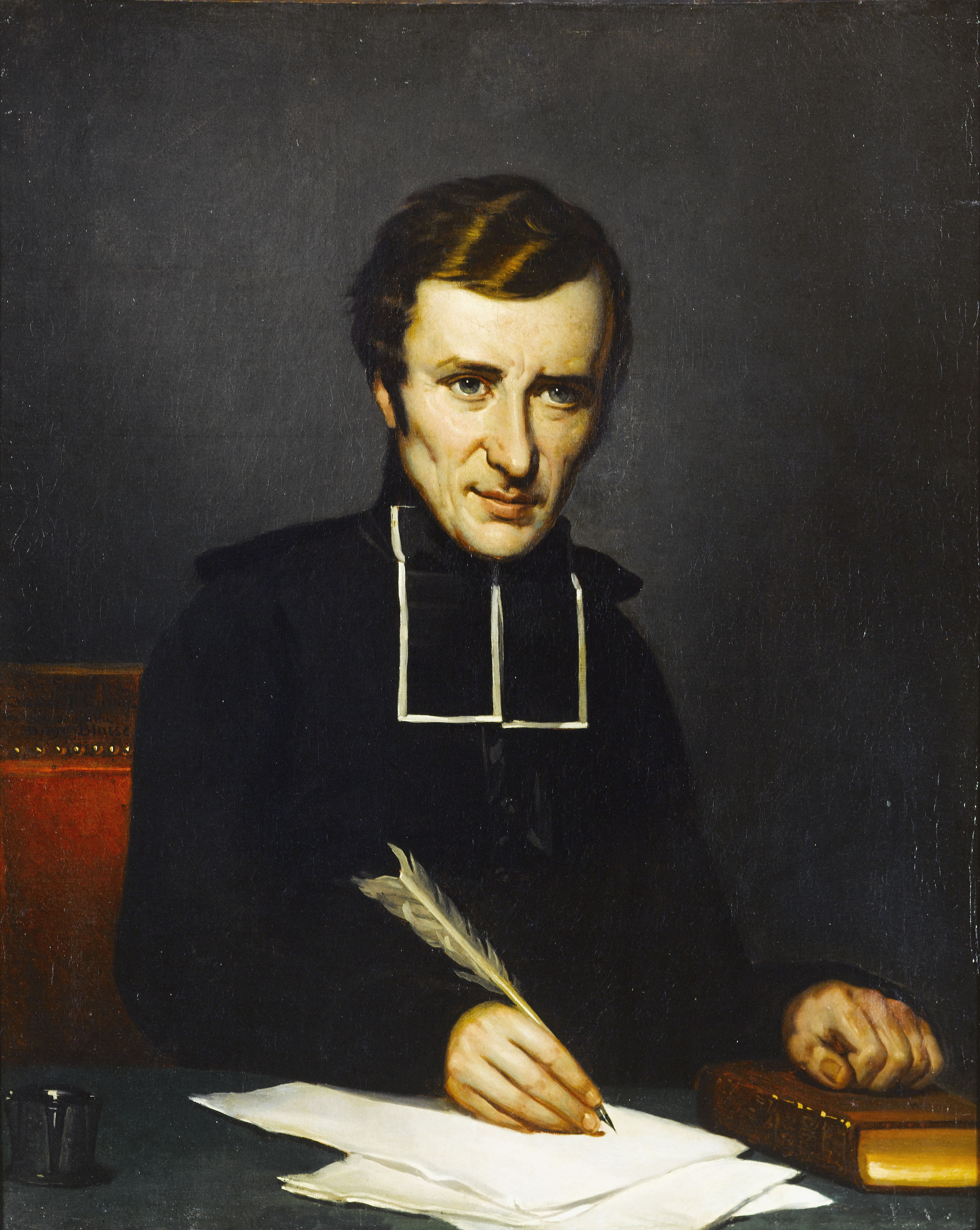
Felicité Robert de Lamennais (1827)

While Lamennais agreed to submit to the Pope in matters of faith and morals, he noticeably did not retract any of his political views. Although he ceased publication of L'Avenir, Lamennais continued to be attacked by French conservatives. In 1834, he responded with a short, biting book, Paroles d'un croyant ("Words of a Believer") in which he denounced all authority, civil as well as ecclesiastical. The book was a sensation. Franz Liszt dedicated the piano piece "Lyon" (S156 1) to Lamennais. Fyodor Dostoyevsky encouraged Alexander Milyukov to translate Words of a Believer into Church Slavonic.

== Encyclical ==
Gregory XVI issued Singulari Nos on June 25, 1834. It stated: "We have learned of the pamphlet written in French under the title Paroles d'un croyant, for it has been printed by this man and disseminated everywhere. [...] Though small in size, it is enormous in wickedness. [...] Once the torch of treason is ignited everywhere, it ruins public order, fosters contempt of government, and stimulates lawlessness." He added:

We have studied the book entitled Paroles d'un croyant. By Our apostolic power, We condemn the book: [...] It corrupts the people by a wicked abuse of the word of God, to dissolve the bonds of all public order and to weaken all authority. It arouses, fosters, and strengthens seditions, riots, and rebellions in the empires. We condemn the book because it contains false, calumnious, and rash propositions which lead to anarchy; which are contrary to the word of God; which are impious, scandalous, and erroneous; and which the Church already condemned.

The encyclical ended with a plea for the author to recognize his errors.

== Effects ==
Lamennais's brother Jean-Marie, by that time Superior General of the Mission Priests of the Immaculate Conception, repudiated Paroles, and the two never met again.

Paroles and Gregory's response effectively allowed no middle ground between the two positions. Few of Lamennais's associates were willing to follow him out of the Church.

J. P. T. Bury finds it ironic that the most lasting effect of Lamennais's polemics was a strengthening of ultramontanism. He notes that Dom Prosper Guéranger, who was an early follower of Lamennais, became the principal agent of a liturgical revival and a uniform Roman liturgy.

Lamennais later had an account of his visit to Rome published in Brussels, Affaires de Rome (1837), which was addressed the Pope and referred to "the faults of the church and of society, and the means of remedying them." Circulation of Affaires de Rome was prohibited in Prussia.
