= Charles Forbes René de Montalembert =

French publicist and historian (1810–1870)

Charles-Forbes-René, comte de Montalembert
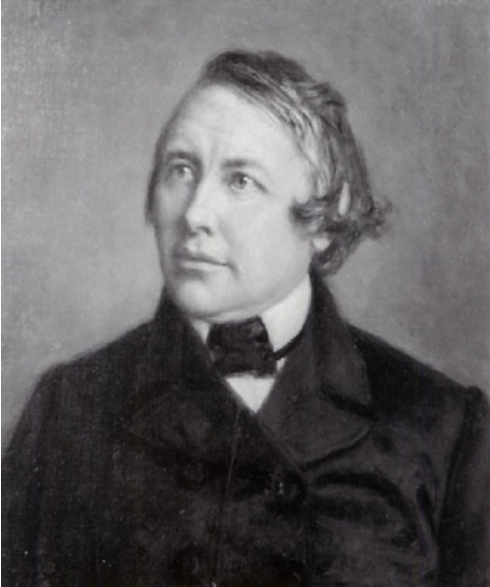
- Charles Forbes, Comte de Montalembert, painted by George Peter Alexander Healy in 1855

Personal details
- Born: 15 April 1810 London, England, United Kingdom of Great Britain and Ireland
- Died: 13 March 1870 (aged 59) Paris, Second French Empire

Charles-Forbes-René, comte de Montalembert (French: [ʃaʁl fɔʁb ʁəne də mɔ̃talɑ̃bɛʁ]; 15 April 1810 – 13 March 1870) was a French publicist, historian and Count of Montalembert, Deux-Sèvres, and a prominent representative of liberal Catholicism.

== Family ==
Charles Forbes René de Montalembert who was born on 15 April 1810, was of French and Scots ancestry. His father, Marc René, belonged to the family of Angoumois, which could trace its descent back to the 13th century, while charters show the history of the house even two centuries earlier. For several generations the family had been distinguished, both in the army and in the field of science. Montalembert senior had fought under Louis Joseph, Prince of Condé, and subsequently served in the British army. He married Eliza Rose Forbes, whose father, James Forbes, belonged to a very old Scottish Protestant family. Charles, their eldest son, was born in London. At the French Restoration of 1814, Marc René returned to France, was raised to the peerage in 1820, and became ambassador to Sweden, where Charles completed his education in 1826.

== Career ==
Montalembert's early years were spent in England, where he was largely raised by his grandfather, who, although a Protestant, encouraged him to follow the religion of his father. In 1819 he attended the Lycée Bourbon and at the Collège Sainte-Barbe in Paris. In 1829 he was a contributor to the review Le Correspondant. In September and October 1830, he travelled in Ireland, where he met Daniel O'Connell; he was thinking of assisting the cause for which O'Connell was struggling by writing a history of Ireland, when he learned that the House of Commons had passed the Irish Emancipation Act.

Charles de Montalembert was under twenty-five at his father's death in 1831 and therefore too young to take his seat as a peer, but he retained other rights. Combined with his literary and intellectual activity, this made him a person of some importance. He was a Liberal, in the English sense, and disagreed with the new regime on only the religious question. He would have approved of the policy of the golden mean represented by Louis Philippe. He wished to see the Church free from state control and attacked the monopoly of public instruction by which the monarchy fortified its position. This latter scheme first brought Montalembert to public attention when he was formally charged with unlicensed teaching. He claimed the right of trial by his peers and made a notable defence with a deliberate intention of protest in 1832.

On the other hand, he thought that the Church should not obstinately oppose new ideas. He had eagerly entered into the plans of his friends, Lamennais and Lacordaire, and he collaborated with them in the newspaper, L'Avenir ("The Future"). He especially distinguished himself in "L'Avenir" by his campaigns in favour of freedom for Ireland and Poland, and for these he received the congratulations of Victor Hugo and Alfred de Vigny. In 1831 he thought of going to Poland and joining the insurgents there. He was instrumental in setting up the Polish Library in Paris and its associated literary society for the Great Emigration into France.

The Ultramontane party was roused by the boldness of Montalembert and his two friends who then left for Rome. They failed to win any mitigation of the measures which the Roman curia took against L'Avenir. Its doctrines were condemned in two encyclicals, Mirari vos in 1832 and Singulari Nos in 1834, and Montalembert submitted. In 1835 he took his seat in the Chamber of Peers, and his competence soon made him famous. He clung to his early liberalism, and in 1848 saw the end of a government towards which he had always been hostile. In 1848 he was elected to the Chamber of Deputies. He was at first inclined to support Napoleon III, but was soon alienated by his policy. Montalembert remained in the Chamber until 1857, when he was obliged to retire to private life. He was still recognised as a formidable opponent of the Empire. Meanwhile, his Liberal ideas had made him some irreconcilable enemies among the Ultramontanists. Louis Veuillot, in his paper, L'Univers religieux, opposed him. In 1855 Montalembert answered them by reviving a review which had for some time ceased publication, Le Correspondant. This he used to fight the party of Veuillot and the far-left Liberals of the Revue des deux mondes.

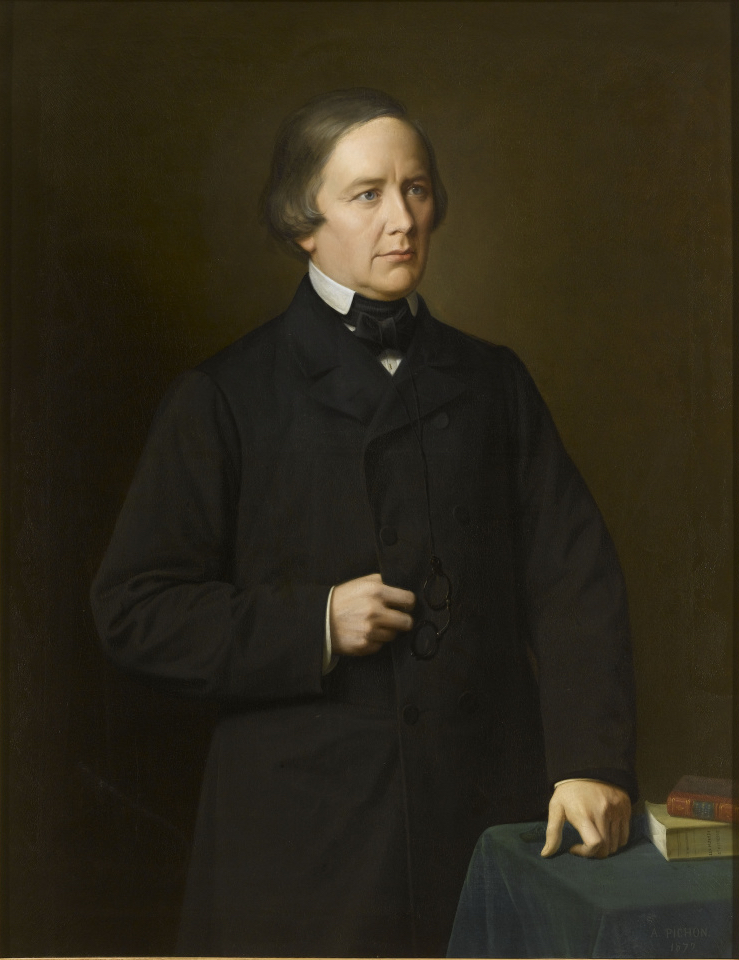
Charles Forbes René de Montalembert, painted in 1879

At a noted Catholic congress in Malines, Belgium in 1863, Montalembert gave two long addresses on Catholic Liberalism. He was also a staunch supporter of the independence of education from the state:

I do not want to be constrained by the state to believe what it believes to be true, because the State is not the judge of truth. However the State is bound to protect me in the practice of the truth that I choose, that is to say, the exercise of the religion that I profess This is what constitutes religious freedom in the modern state, which the free state is bound to respect and guarantee, not only for each citizen in particular, but for groups of citizens joined together to profess and propagate their belief, that is to say, for corporation, for associations, and for churches."

He took great interest in the débuts of the Liberal empire. He severed his connection with Père Hyacinthe Loyson as he had with Lamennais and made the submission expected of him to the council. It was his last fall. Montalembert became increasingly isolated, politically, for his support of religious freedom in education; and by the Church for his liberal views.

Charles de Montalembert died in 1870.

== Marriage ==
Montalembert married Mlle de Merode, daughter of Félix de Mérode. His daughter married the vicomte de Meaux, a Roman Catholic statesman and distinguished writer. He was thus the brother-in-law of Belgian prelate and papal statesman Xavier de Mérode.

Montalembert was a close friend of Edwin Wyndham-Quin, 3rd Earl of Dunraven and Mount-Earl with whom he toured Scotland in 1862, staying at Dunraven Castle on his return journey. The viscount travelled with Montalembert to Switzerland the following year and stayed at Maîche, Doubs (Montalembert's country property) on his return.

== Writing and works (selection) ==
In addition to being an eloquent orator, Montalembert wrote in a style at once picturesque, fiery and polished. He was an ardent student of the Middle Ages, but his medieval enthusiasm was strongly tinctured with religious sentiments. His first historical work, La Vie de Ste Elisabeth de Hongrie (1836), is not so much a history as a religious manifesto, which did much to restore the position of hagiography. It met with great success, but Montalembert was not elected a member of the Académie française until 1851, after the fall of the July Monarchy.

From this time he gave much of his attention to a great work on monasticism in the West. He was at first attracted by the figure of St. Bernard and devoted one volume to him. He later withdrew it on the advice of his friend Dupanloup, and the entire printing was destroyed. He then enlarged his original plan and published the first volumes of his Moines d'occident (1860), an eloquent work which was received with much admiration in those circles where language was more appreciated than learning. The work, unfinished at the time of the author's death, was completed later from some long fragments found among his papers. Volumes VI and VII appeared in 1877.

Like Chateaubriand he kept a close (now published) record of acquaintances, invitations, necrology.

- Défense de l'école libre devant la Chambre des Pairs (1831)
- Histoire de sainte Élisabeth, reine de Hongrie (1836)
- Monuments de l'histoire de sainte Élisabeth (1838)
- Du vandalisme et du catholicisme dans l'art (1839)
- The Obligation of Catholics in the Matter of Freedom of Teaching (1843)
- Catholic Interests in the Nineteenth Century (1852)
- Political Future of England (1855)
- Illustrations of West American oaks. From drawings by Albert Kellog; the text by Edward L. Greene. Published from funds provided by James M. McDonald (1856)
- Pius IX and France in 1849 and 1859 (1860)
- Memoir of the Abbe Lacordaire. Authorized translation. (London, Richard Bentley, 1863)
- Les moines d'Occident depuis saint Benoît jusqu'à saint Bernard ("The Monks of the West from St. Benedict to St. Bernard," Paris: J. Lecoffre Fils et Cie., 1877)
- Saint Columban, English ed., with introduction, notes and critical studies by Rev. E.J. McCarthy, S.S.C (1927)
- Emmanuel Mounier, ed., Montalembert (Paris, 1945), an anthology of his writing

== Tributes ==
Tributes to Charles Forbes, earl of Montalembert
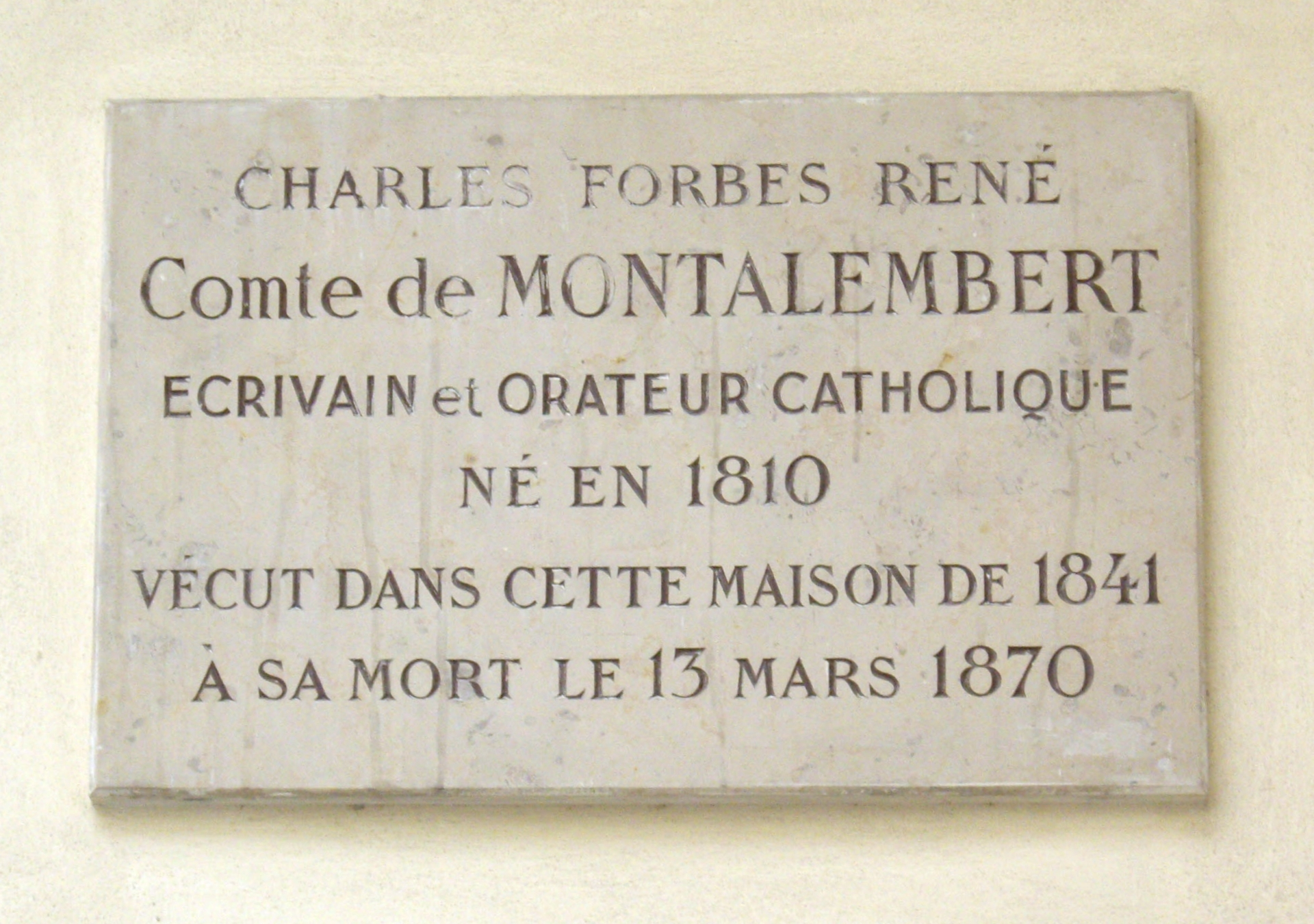
Memorial plaque to Charles de Montalembert, 5 impasse de Valmy, Paris 7

== Sources ==
- Thomas Bokenkotter, Church and Revolution: Catholics and the Struggle for Democracy and Social Justice (New York: Doubleday, 1998)
- E.E.Y. Hales, Pio Nono: A Study of European Politics and Religion in the Nineteenth Century (London: Eyre and Spottiswoode, 1954)
- R.P. Lecanuet, Montalembert d'après son journal et sa correspondence, 3 vols. (Paris, 1895)
- Jean Maurain, La politique ecclésiastique du Second Empire de 1852 à 1869 (Paris, 1930)
- George Weill, Histoire du Catholicisme libéral en France (1828–1908) (Paris, 1909)
- Roger L. Williams, Gaslight and Shadow: The World of Napoleon III (New York: Macmillan, 1957), Ch. 3: "Montalembert and Liberal Catholicism"
- Charles de Montalembert, Journal intime inedit, vii volumes, Texte établi, présenté et annoté par Louis Le Guillou et Nicole Roger Taillade, Honoré de Champion Paris, ...-2008 [Bibliothèque des correspondances, mémoires et journaux, ...-39]
