= Mirari vos =

1832 papal encyclical by Gregory XVI

Mirari vos Latin for 'That you wonder' Encyclical of Pope Gregory XVI
- Signature date: August 1832
- Subject: On liberalism and religious indifferentism
- Number: 4 of 9 of the pontificate
- Text: In English

Mirari vos (Latin: "That you wonder"; subtitled "On Liberalism and Religious Indifferentism"), sometimes referred to as Mirari vos arbitramur, was the fourth encyclical letter of Pope Gregory XVI and was issued in August 1832. Addressed to "All Patriarchs, Primates, Archbishops, and Bishops of the Catholic World", it is general in its audience and scope, whereas his three earlier encyclicals had been addressed to more specific audiences in the Papal States and the Kingdom of Poland. (Note: In a letter sent by Pope Gregory to Francesco Saverio Caruana, Bishop of Malta, in 1843, the Pope refers to Mirari vos as "our first encyclical letter of 15 August 1832".)

== Background ==
Felicité de Lamennais, Charles de Montalembert and Henri Lacordaire had started a newspaper, L'Avenir ("The Future") in October 1830. While the paper was a strong proponent of ultramontanism, supporting the authority of the papacy in opposition to nationalist and secularist ideas, it also advocated an enlarged suffrage, separation of church and state, and universal freedom of conscience, instruction, assembly, and the press. Its editors saw no conflict between Catholicism and liberal reform. The conservative French hierarchy regarded such views as dangerous nonsense, many considering an established church, a Catholic near-monopoly in education, and an anointed monarch as the bedrock of a godly society. In November 1831, Lammennais and Montalembert traveled to Rome, seeking confirmation from Pope Gregory that views expressed in their newspaper were orthodox.

Although pressured by the French government and the French hierarchy, Gregory would have preferred not to make an official issue of the matter. After much opposition, the pair gained an audience on March 15, 1832, on condition that their political views should not be mentioned. The meeting was apparently cordial and uneventful. The leading conservative statesman Klemens von Metternich, whose Austrian troops guaranteed the stability of the Papal States, pressed for a condemnation.

The Pope's advisors were convinced that if he said nothing, it would condone Lamennais's opinions. Mirari vos was issued the following August, criticizing Lamennais's views without mentioning him by name.

== Contents ==
Gregory opened the letter with an explanation regarding his delay in issuing a general encyclical. (Note: 560 days had elapsed between Gregory's accession to the papacy and the publication of Mirari vos. In contrast, his immediate predecessors, Pius VII, Leo XII and Pius VIII had issued their first encyclicals much sooner: Diu Satis (Pius VII) after 62 days, Ubi Primum (Leo XII) after 220 days and Traditi Humilitati (Pius VIII) after 54 days. Gregory's successor, Pius IX, referred to "the established practice of our predecessors" when he issued his first encyclical letter, Qui pluribus, on 9 November 1846, 146 days after his election.) By August 1832 he was in a position to write to the Catholic Church hierarchy in relation to the conditions of the time as he saw them, noting that publication took place on "the feast of the Assumption of the Virgin".

The encyclical upheld the ecclesiastical supremacy of the papacy and raised concerns over close alliances between clergy and government. It denounced those who advocated a married clergy: "We ask that you strive with all your might to justify and to defend the law of clerical celibacy as prescribed by the sacred canons, against which the arrows of the lascivious are directed from every side." He also denounced those who advocated divorce, and secret societies that sought to overturn the legitimate governments of the Italian states.

The pope attacked religious indifferentism, defined as the opinion that one religion is as good as another, which he saw as the basis for the argument for liberty of conscience. He saw it as the state's duty to curtail false, immoral doctrines, and so denounced freedom to publish indiscriminately. Owen Chadwick explains Gregory's perspective: "To provide legally that writers or speakers shall be free to promote what is not true or to utter words that declare that racial prejudice, or paederasty, or pornography, or adultery, or murder not to be sins, cannot be what God demands of any State".

He stated,

"Some are so carried away that they contentiously assert that the flock of errors arising from them is sufficiently compensated by the publication of some book which defends religion and truth. Every law condemns deliberately doing evil simply because there is some hope that good may result. Is there any sane man who would say poison ought to be distributed, sold publicly, stored, and even drunk because some antidote is available and those who use it may be snatched from death again and again?

The encyclical satisfied neither Lamennais's supporters nor his detractors.

== Later developments ==
Subsequently, Gregory wrote Litteras accepimus, a letter addressed to Claude-Louis de Lesquen, Bishop of Rennes ("C.L."), 5 October 1833, regarding Lamennais' continuing non-compliance with the directives of Mirari vos. This letter is referenced in the opening paragraph of a later encyclical letter, Singulari Nos. Litteras accepimus also refers to a letter which Gregory had previously sent to Paul-Thérèse-David d'Astros, Archbishop of Toulouse. D'Astros was one of the earliest of the French bishops who were critical of Lamennais. In the letter, Gregory directed Lesquen to meet with Lamennais and verify his submission to the authority of the Pope.

A further letter, Quod litteris, was sent to Lesquen on 29 November 1833. In this letter, Gregory refers to further correspondence between Lamennais and Lesquen, and between Lamennais and the Pope himself (dated 5 November 1833), which disappointed Gregory on account of Lamennais' failure to declare his submission "without ambiguity and with absolute frankness". Quod litteris summarises Mirari vos (referring to it as "our encyclical letter"), as a statement of doctrine "recalling the most holy rules of the Scriptures, of tradition, of the canons, of the Fathers and of discipline".

== See also ==
- Declaration Concerning Status of Catholics Becoming Freemasons
- Singulari Nos
