= Cum primum (encyclical) =

1832 encyclical of Pope Gregory XVI

Cum primum Latin for 'As soon as' Encyclical of Pope Gregory XVI
- Signature date: 9 June 1832
- Subject: Condemnation of the November Uprising in the Kingdom of Poland
- Text: In Latin; In English

Cum primum, subtitled On Civil Disobedience, is an encyclical issued by Pope Gregory XVI on June 9, 1832. The encyclical is addressed to the episcopate of the Kingdom of Poland and is primarily a condemnation of the November Uprising: the Pontiff condemns the revolts, reminding Polish Catholics that legitimate authorities derive their power from God and cannot be disobeyed, unless they violate the law of God by their acts.

== See also ==
- Roman Catholicism in Poland
- List of encyclicals of Pope Gregory XVI
