= Pope Gregory XVI =

Head of the Catholic Church from 1831 to 1846

- Bishop of Rome
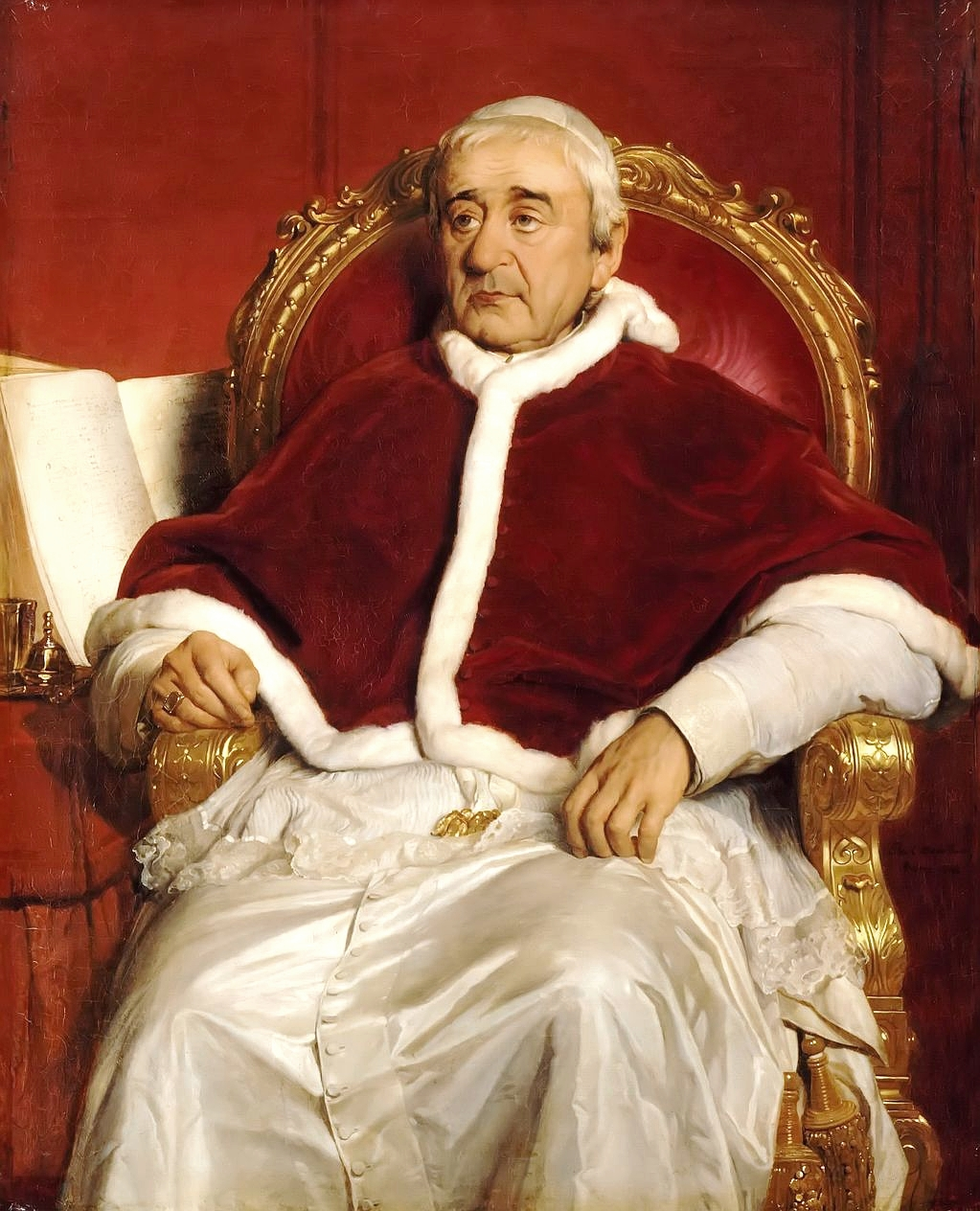
- Portrait by Paul Delaroche, 1844
- Church: Catholic Church
- Papacy began: 2 February 1831
- Papacy ended: 1 June 1846
- Predecessor: Pius VIII
- Successor: Pius IX
- Previous posts: Vicar General of the Camaldolese Order (1814‍–‍1826); Cardinal Priest of San Callisto (1826‍–‍1831); Prefect of the Congregation for the Propagation of the Faith (1826‍–‍1831)

Orders
- Ordination: 1787
- Consecration: 6 February 1831 by Bartolomeo Pacca
- Created cardinal: 21 March 1825 (in pectore); 13 March 1826 (revealed) by Leo XII

Personal details
- Born: Bartolomeo Alberto Cappellari; 18 September 1765 Belluno, Republic of Venice
- Died: 1 June 1846 (aged 80) Rome, Papal States

- Coat of arms

Pope Gregory XVI (Latin: Gregorius PP. XVI; Italian: Gregorio XVI; born Bartolomeo Alberto Cappellari; 18 September 1765 – 1 June 1846) was head of the Catholic Church and leader of the Papal States from 2 February 1831 to his death in June 1846. He had adopted the name Mauro upon entering the religious order of the Camaldolese. He is the most recent pope to take the pontifical name "Gregory", the last to govern the Papal States for the whole duration of his pontificate, and the most recent not to have been a bishop when elected.

Born in Belluno, Cappellari joined the order of Camaldolese when he was eighteen. Ordained as a priest in 1787, he was a teacher of both philosophy and theology. Cappellari was made a cardinal, and, in 1831, he was elected as pope, taking the papal name Gregory XVI. A staunch defender of traditional doctrine against new ideas, he worked to protect the Papal States from attacks by Italian patriotic movements. His pontificate saw a renewed commitment to missionary work overseas. In his 1839 papal brief In supremo apostolatus, Pope Gregory XVI condemned both the slave trade and the continuance of the institution of slavery. He died of erysipelas in June 1846.

== Biography ==
=== Early life ===
Bartolomeo Alberto Cappellari was born at Belluno in the Republic of Venice, on 18 September 1765, as the last of five children, to a local Italian lower noble family, notable since the 16th century, aggregated to the local Nobility Council in 1670 and traditionally linked to liberal professions but not to the consecrated life. He was baptized at the parish of Bolzano Bellunese by his uncle Antonio Capellari. His parents were from a small village named Pesariis, in Friuli. His father, Giovanni Battista Capellari, was a notary. His mother, Giulia Cesa was a daughter of a notary. At the age of eighteen, Bartolomeo Cappellari joined the order of the Camaldolese (part of the Benedictine monastic family) and entered the Monastery of San Michele in Murano, near Venice. He was ordained a priest in 1787. As a Camaldolese monk, Cappellari rapidly gained distinction for his theological and linguistic skills, and was assigned to teach philosophy and theology at San Michele in 1787, at the age of 22.

In 1790, at the age of 25, he was appointed censor librorum for his Order, as well as for the Holy Office at Venice. He went to Rome in 1795 and in 1799 published a polemic against the Italian Jansenists titled II Trionfo della Santa Sede ("The Triumph of the Holy See"), which passed through various editions in Italy and was translated into several European languages. In 1800, he became a member of the Academy of the Catholic Religion, founded by Pope Pius VII (1800–1823), to which he contributed memoirs on theological and philosophical questions. In 1805, at the age of 40, he was appointed abbot of the Monastery of San Gregorio on Rome's Caelian Hill.

When the army of the French Emperor Napoleon took Rome and arrested and deported Pius VII to France in 1809, Cappellari fled to Murano, where he taught in the Monastery of St. Michele of his Order, where he had first become a monk. From there he and a group of monks moved their little college to Padua in 1814. After Napoleon's final defeat, the Congress of Vienna re-established the sovereignty of the Papal States over central Italy and Cappellari was called back to Rome to assume the post of vicar general of the Camaldolese Order. He was then appointed as Counsellor to the Inquisition, and later promoted to be Consultor (29 February 1820) and then, on 1 October 1826, Prefect of the Congregation of Propaganda Fide ("Propagation of the Faith"), which dealt with all missionary work outside of the Spanish Empire, including missions to the non-Catholic states in Europe. Twice he was offered a bishopric and twice he refused.

=== Cardinal ===
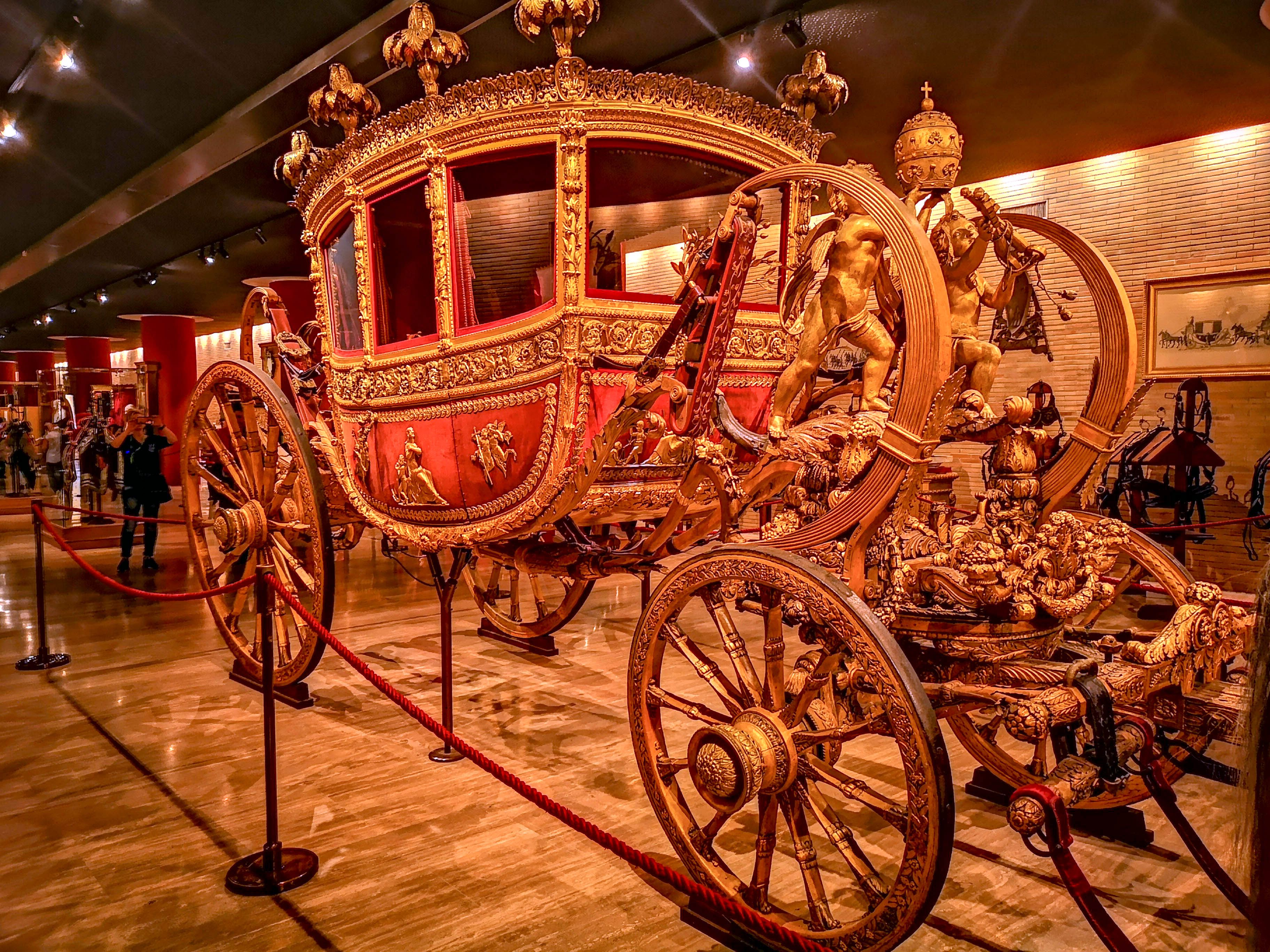
"The Grand Gala Berlin" is a luxury carriage constructed in Rome during the first half of the nineteenth century. It is the work of two pontiffs: Leo XII, who called for it to be produced in 1824–1826, and Gregory XVI, who requested some important modifications.

On 21 March 1825, Cappellari was created cardinal in pectore (published 13 March 1826) by Pope Leo XII, and shortly afterwards he was asked to negotiate a concordat to safeguard the rights of Catholics in the United Kingdom of the Netherlands, a diplomatic task which he completed successfully. He also negotiated a peace on behalf of Armenian Catholics with the Ottoman Empire. He publicly condemned the Polish revolutionaries, who he thought were seeking to undermine Russian Tsar Nicholas I's efforts to support the Catholic royalist cause in France by forcing him to divert his troops to suppress the uprising in Poland.

Cappellari had never travelled outside Italy and was most familiar with Venice and Rome. He spoke Italian and Latin fluently, but no other European languages, and did not understand European politics. However, he was proficient in Armenian, and Haruti'iwn Awgerian (Pascal Aucher)'s 1827 Venice edition of works attributed to Severian of Gabala and translated into Armenian was dedicated to him.

== Pontificate ==
=== Papal election ===
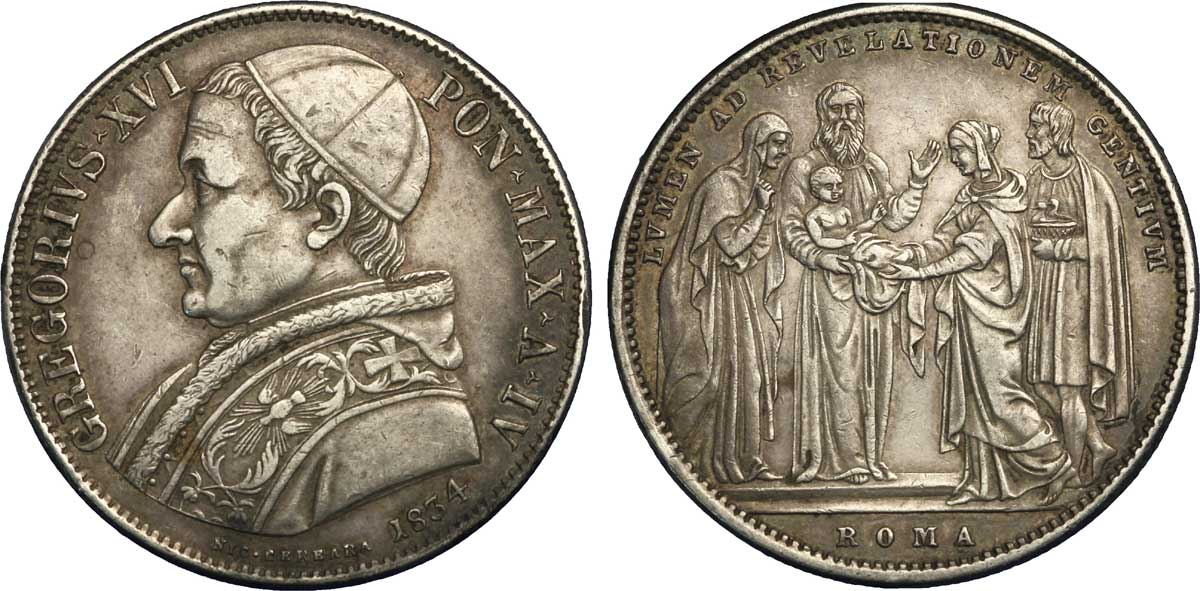
Coin of Pope Gregory XVI, 1834

Papal styles of Pope Gregory XVI
- Reference style: His Holiness
- Spoken style: Your Holiness
- Religious style: Holy Father
- Posthumous style: None

On 2 February 1831, after a fifty-day conclave, Cappellari was unexpectedly chosen to succeed Pope Pius VIII (1829–30). His election was influenced by the fact that the cardinal considered the most papabile, Giacomo Giustiniani, was vetoed by King Ferdinand VII of Spain. There then arose a deadlock between the other two major candidates, Emmanuele de Gregorio and Bartolomeo Pacca. What finally drove the cardinals to make a decision was a message from the government of Parma notifying them that revolt was about to break out in the northern Papal States. To resolve the impasse, the cardinals turned to Cappellari, but it took eighty-three ballots for the canonically required two-thirds majority to be reached.

At the time of election, Cardinal Cappellari was not yet a bishop; he is the most recent man to be elected pope prior to his episcopal consecration. He was consecrated as bishop by Bartolomeo Pacca, Cardinal Bishop of Ostia and Velletri and dean of the Sacred College of Cardinals, with Pietro Francesco Galleffi, Cardinal Bishop of Porto e Santa Rufina and sub-dean of the Sacred College of Cardinals, and Tommasso Arezzo, Cardinal Bishop of Sabina, acting as co-consecrators.

The choice of Gregory XVI as his regnal name was influenced by the fact that he had been abbot of the Monastery of San Gregorio on the Coelian Hill for more than twenty years, and in honour of Gregory XV, the founder of the Congregation for the Propagation of the Faith. The Monastery of San Gregorio was the same abbey from which Pope Gregory I had dispatched missionaries to England in 596.

=== Actions ===
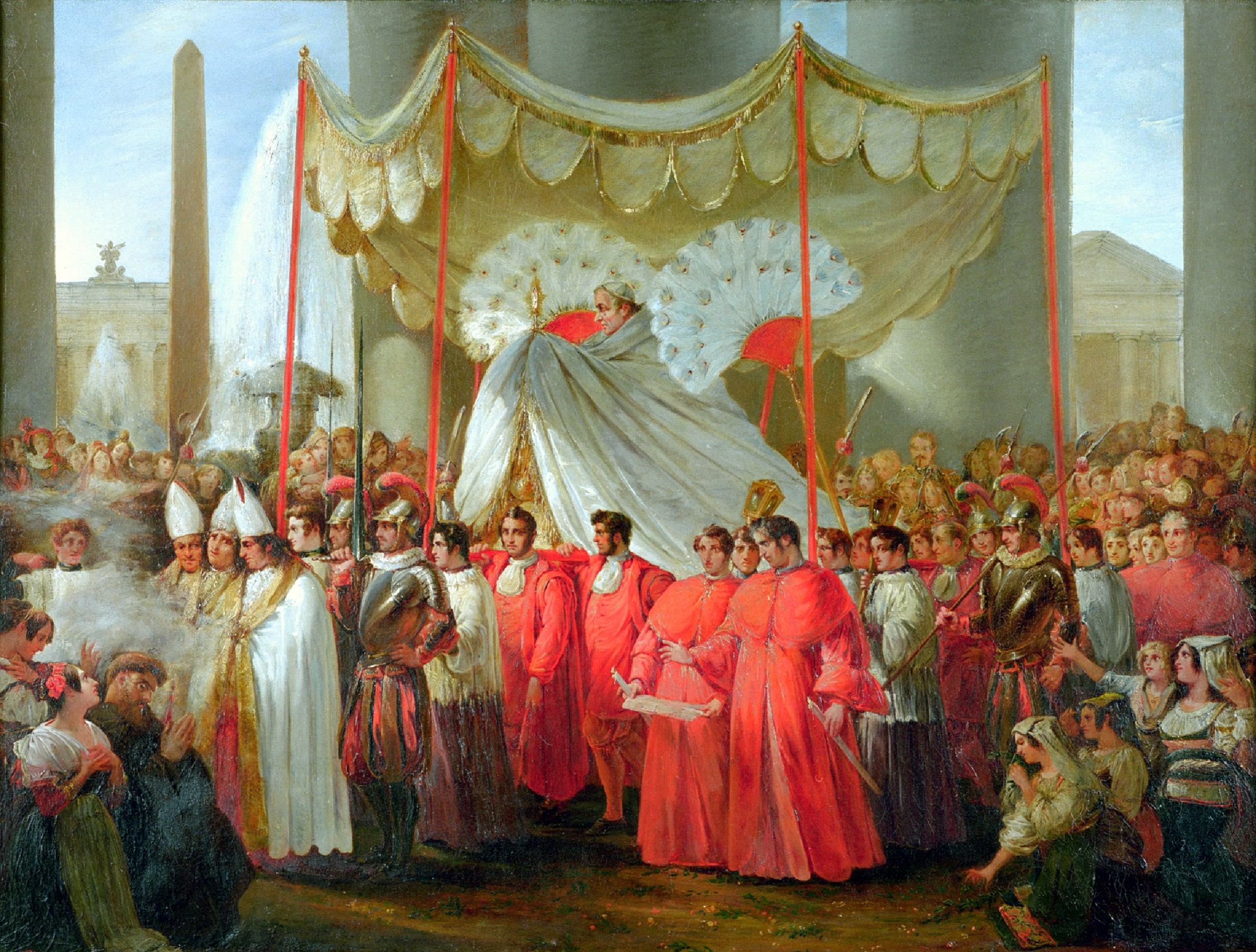
Pope Gregory XVI leading a Eucharistic procession. Painting by Ferdinando Cavalleri (1840)

The revolution of 1830, which overthrew the House of Bourbon, had just inflicted a severe blow on the Catholic royalist party in France. Almost the first act of the new French government was to seize Ancona, thus throwing Italy, and particularly the Papal States, into a state of confusion and political upheaval. Gregory issued a proclamation on 9 February 1831, one week after his election, expressing good will towards his subjects. In the course of the struggle that ensued, the Pope found it necessary more than once to call in Austrian troops to fight the red-shirted republicans engaged in a guerrilla campaign. The conservative administration of the Papal States postponed their promised reforms after a series of bombings and assassination attempts. The replacement of Tommaso Bernetti by Luigi Lambruschini as Cardinal Secretary of State in 1836 did nothing to appease the situation.

In the northern territories, the leaders of the revolt were middle-class gentry opposed to the general inefficiency of the government.

=== Governance of the papal states ===
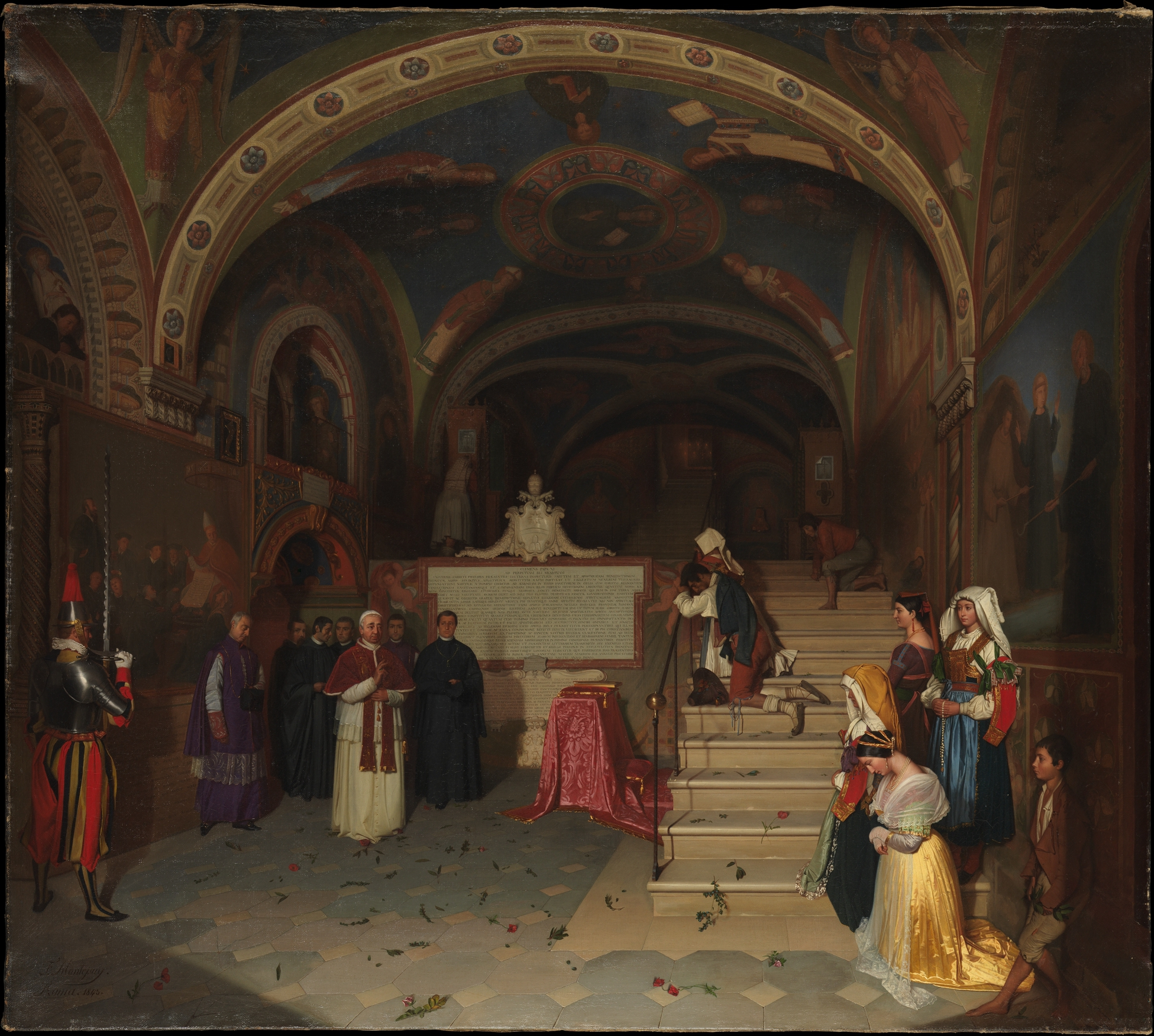
Pope Gregory XVI visiting the Church of San Benedetto at Subiaco, Lazio. Painting by Jean-François Montessuy (1843)

Some authors from a much later period, publishing accounts without any verifiable proof, claim that Gregory XVI and Cardinal Lambruschini opposed basic technological innovations such as gas lighting and railways, believing that they would promote commerce and increase the power of the bourgeoisie, leading to demands for liberal reforms which would undermine the monarchical power of the Pope over central Italy. Gregory XVI is believed by some to have banned railways in the Papal States, with apocryphal accounts claiming he called them chemins d'enfer ("road to hell", a play on the French for railroad, chemin de fer, literally "iron road") - however, there is no document or public statement from the Pope banning or saying anything of the sort. Evidence suggests that railway projects were just postponed for purely economic reasons, as the papal territory was mountainous, making railroads more expensive than in other countries, in addition to the need to import iron and coal from abroad, which at the time would have crippled state finances. Only years later, already under Pius IX, with the increase in global production and supply of commodities, did imports become viable for the state budget and railways were built.

The insurrections at Viterbo in 1836, in various parts of the Legations in 1840, caused by the salt wars at Ravenna in 1843 and at Rimini in 1845, were followed by wholesale executions and draconian sentences of hard labour and exile, but they did not bring the unrest within the Papal States under the control of the authorities. Gregory XVI made great expenditures for defensive, architectural and engineering works, having a monument to Pope Leo XII built by Giuseppe Fabris in 1837. He also lavished patronage on such scholars as Angelo Mai, Giuseppe Mezzofanti, and Gaetano Moroni. This largesse, however, significantly weakened the finances of the Papal States.

=== Encyclicals ===
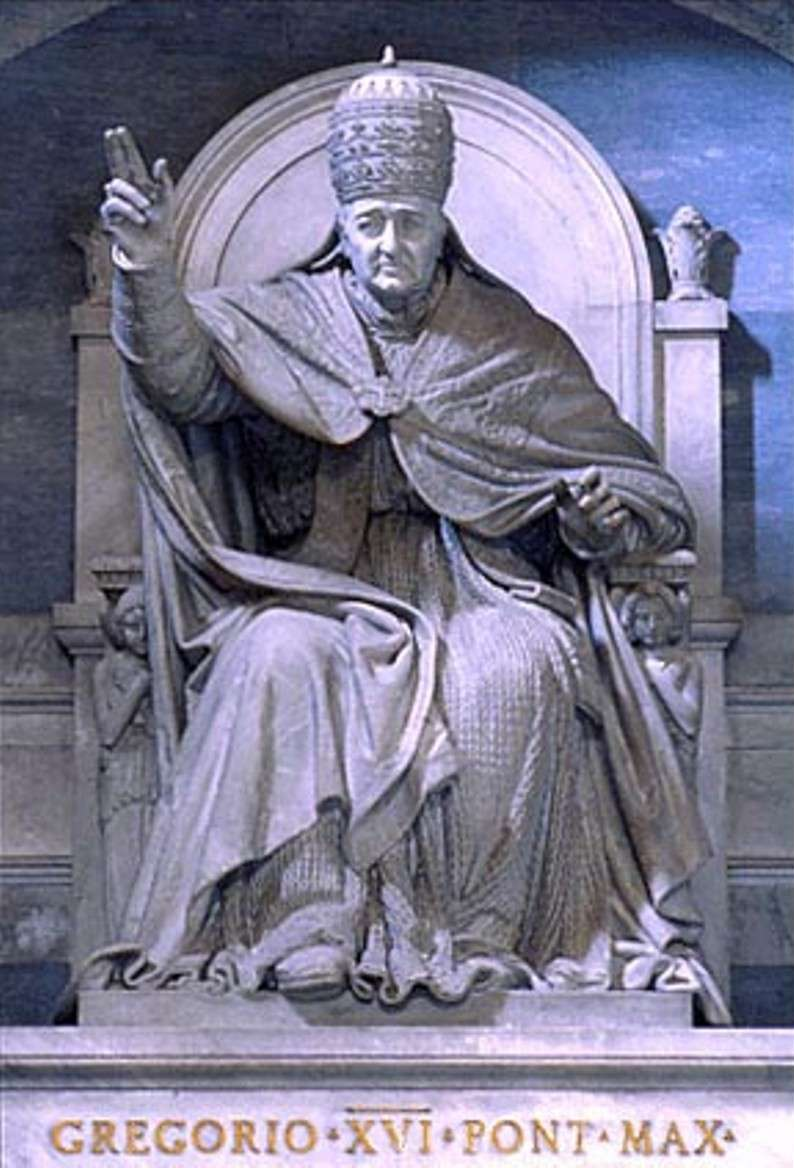
Monument to Gregory XVI in Saint Peter's Basilica

Gregory issued nine encyclical letters (enciclica or epistola encyclica) during his reign as pope. According to the Holy See's website, these were:

No.	Title (Latin)	Title or English translation	Subject	Date
1.	Quel Dio	"That God ..."	End of the insurrection in the Papal States (Note: Quel Dio was written following Carbonari-led disturbances in the Papal States in 1831 and addressed to tutti i sudditi dello Stato Pontificio ("To all the subjects of the Papal States"). This letter was concerned with the "restoration of peace" within the pope's realm following the uprisings, described as the "anxieties which had afflicted his reign" from its beginning ... driven by "the machinery of impiety" (le macchine dell’empietà). The Romagna and all parts of the Papal States except Lazio were affected by the Carbonari disturbances. The letter recorded Gregory's gratitude to the imperial Austrian army for its role as the "liberator" and "saviour" of the Papal States. Francis I of Austria is praised with "indelible gratitude" by Gregory for his role in supporting the restoration of order. Cardinal Giovanni Antonio Benvenuti, Bishop of Osimo e Cingoli, was singled out for comment: he had been sent to subdue the rebellion but was imprisoned by the Carbonari "provisional government"; later he was released.)	5 April 1831
2.	Le armi valorose	"The Valiant Weapons"	On the pacification of the Papal States	12 July 1831
3.	Cum primum	"When the First [report]"	Condemnation of the November Uprising in Kingdom of Poland	9 July 1832
4.	Mirari vos	"That You Wonder"	The conditions of the time as Gregory saw them, and condemnation of liberalism and indifferentism (Note: This was Gregory's first encyclical intended to reach the wider Church rather than those affected by specific issues.)	15 August 1832
5.	Singulari Nos	"Us in Particular"	Condemnation of the ideas of Félicité de La Mennais	25 June 1834
6.	Commissum divinitus	"Divinely Commissioned"	Condemnation of certain doctrinal errors being adopted especially in parts of Switzerland	17 May 1835
7.	Augustissimam beatissimi	"Most August, Most Blessed"	Restoration of the Basilica of Saint Paul Outside the Walls (Note: Augustissimam beatissimi asked the bishops of the Catholic Church to collect offerings from the people of their dioceses to fund the remaining work to be undertaken in restoring the Basilica of Saint Paul Outside the Walls of Rome, damaged by a fire in 1823. By October 1840 the central altar and other parts of the building had been restored but funds were needed for the remaining parts of the project. The entire building was reconsecrated in 1854 in the presence of Pope Pius IX and fifty cardinals. Gregory's letter praises Paul the Apostle, drawing in particular on language used by St. John Chrysostom.)	21 December 1840
8.	Inter ea	"Among These [concerns]"	Condemnation of anti-clerical laws in the Swiss Confederation	1 April 1842
9.	Inter praecipuas	"Among the Special Schemes"	Condemnation of non-Catholic Bible translations	8 May 1844

=== Other activities ===
==== Apostolic letters ====
In supremo apostolatus, an apostolic letter or papal bull, was issued by Pope Gregory XVI regarding the institution of slavery. Issued on 3 December 1839, as a result of a broad consultation among the College of Cardinals, the bull resoundingly denounced both the slave trade and the continuance of the institution of slavery.

He wrote to four Bohemian bishops in 1845 affirming the liturgical use of the term "Immaculate Conception" in relation to the Virgin Mary.

==== Canonizations and beatifications ====
Gregory XVI canonized Veronica Giuliani, an Italian mystic, during his papacy. During his reign, five saints were canonized (notably Alphonsus Liguori) and thirty-three Servants of God were declared Blessed (including the Augustinian Simon of Cascia). In addition, many new religious orders were founded or supported and the devotion of the faithful to the Blessed Virgin Mary increased, both in private and public life.

==== Consistories ====
The pope created 75 cardinals in 24 consistories, in which the pope elevated 35 cardinals "in pectore", including his future successor Giovanni Maria Mastai-Ferretti, who would become Pope Pius IX. The pope also created six additional cardinals in pectore, though the pope died before these names could be revealed, therefore cancelling their appointments to the cardinalate.

In 1836, the pope wanted to nominate Charles Joseph Benoît Mercy d'Argenteau to the College of Cardinals, but the archbishop refused the nomination because he did not wish to leave his family and home for a possible position in the Roman Curia. Gregory XVI nominated four in pectore cardinals on 21 April 1845 and one on 24 November 1845; Gregory XVI also named another in pectore cardinal in the 12 July 1841 consistory, never revealing his name. According to Philippe Boutry, Alerame Maria Pallavicini (the Master of the Sacred Palace) was the in pectore cardinal announced on 24 November 1845; however, Pope Pius IX refused to publish his name upon his ascension to the papacy less than a year later.

=== Death and burial ===
On 20 May 1846, he felt himself failing in health. A few days later, he was taken ill with facial erysipelas. At first, the attack was not thought to be very serious, but on 31 May, his strength suddenly failed, and it was seen that the end was near.

Gregory XVI died at 9:15 am on 1 June 1846 at age 80. That morning, he received the Extreme Unction from the sub-sacristan Agostino Proja. After his funeral, he was buried in Saint Peter's Basilica.

== See also ==
- Cardinals created by Gregory XVI
- 1832 Rothschild loan to the Holy See
- Ludovico Morbioli
- List of popes

== Sources ==
- De Mattei, Roberto (2004). Pius IX. Gracewing. ISBN 9780852446058.
- Petruccelli della Gattina, Ferdinando (1861). Storia arcana del pontificato di Leone XII, Gregorio XVIe Pio IX ossia preliminari della questione romana di E. About con documenti diplomatici per F. Petruccelli de la Gattina (in Italian). Milan: Francesco Colombo. (critical)
- Sylvain, Charles (1889). Grégoire XVI. et son pontificat. Paris: Desclée et de Brouwer.
- Nielsen, Fredrik Kristian (1906). "Chapter XVI: Gregory XVI". The History of the Papacy in the Nineteenth Century: Leo XII to Pius IX. Vol. II. London: J. Murray. pp. 51–101.
- Fitz-Hardinge Berkeley, George (1932). "Chapters VII, VIII, IX". Italy in the Making: 1815 to 1846. Cambridge: Cambridge University Press. pp. 90–138. ISBN 978-0-521-07427-8.
- Ernesto Vercesi (1936). Tre pontificati: Leone XII, Pio VIII, Gregorio XVI (in Italian). Torino: Soc. editrice internazionale.
- Schmidlin, Joseph (1940). Léon XII, Pie VIII et Grégoire XVI, 1823–1846 (in French). Vitte.
- Koenig, Duane. “BACKDROP TO REVOLUTION—THE REIGN OF POPE GREGORY XVI.” Quarterly Journal of the Florida Academy of Sciences 9, no. 2 (1946): 131–43. http://www.jstor.org/stable/24313351.
- Korten, Christopher. “DEFINING MOMENTS: THE REASONS MAURO CAPPELLARI BECAME POPE GREGORY XVI.” Archivum Historiae Pontificiae 47 (2009): 17–39. http://www.jstor.org/stable/23565183.
- Korten, Christopher. "Against the Grain: Pope Gregory XVI’s Optimism Toward Russia in His Censure of Polish Clerics in 1831", The Catholic Historical Review 101, no. 2 (2015): 292–316. http://www.jstor.org/stable/43900025.
- Korten, Christopher. “‘Il Trionfo?’ The Untold Story of Its Development and Pope Gregory XVI's Struggle to Attain Orthodoxy.” The Harvard Theological Review 109, no. 2 (2016): 278–301. http://www.jstor.org/stable/43948562.
- Korten, Christopher. “Pope Gregory XVI’s Chocolate Enterprise: How Some Italian Clerics Survived Financially During the Napoleonic Era.” Church History 86, no. 1 (2017): 63–85. http://www.jstor.org/stable/26292211.
- Quinn, John F. “‘Three Cheers for the Abolitionist Pope!’: American Reaction to Gregory XVI's Condemnation of the Slave Trade, 1840–1860.” The Catholic Historical Review 90, no. 1 (2004): 67–93. http://www.jstor.org/stable/25026521.
- Reinerman, Alan J. “Metternich, Pope Gregory XVI, and Revolutionary Poland, 1831-1842.” The Catholic Historical Review 86, no. 4 (2000): 603–19. http://www.jstor.org/stable/25025819.
- Lefebvre, C., ed. (1948). Gregorio XVI. Vol. Parte seconda. Rome: Pontificia Universita Gregorian. ISBN 978-88-7652-439-4. (laudatory)
- Stogre, Michael (1992). "Chapter Two". That the World May Believe: The Development of Papal Social Thought on Aboriginal Rights. Sherbrooke, Ontario CA: Médiaspaul. pp. 47–124. ISBN 978-2-89039-549-7.
- McBrien, Richard P. (2000). Lives of the Popes. HarperCollins.
- Viaene, Vincent (2001). Belgium and the Holy See from Gregory XVI to Pius IX (1831–1859): Catholic Revival, Society and Politics in 19th-century Europe. Louvain: Leuven University Press. ISBN 978-90-5867-138-7.
- Pham, John-Peter (2004). Heirs of the Fisherman. Oxford University Press. ISBN 978-0-19-517834-0.
- Regoli, Roberto, "Gregorio XVI: una ricerca historiografica," Archivum Historiae Pontificiae 44 (2006), pp. 141–171. (laudatory)
- Curran, Charles E., ed. (2003). "5. Reflections on Slavery; 6. The Correction of Common Catholic Teaching". Change in Official Catholic Moral Teachings. Readings in Moral Theology, no. 13. New York/Mahwah NJ: Paulist Press. pp. 65–79. ISBN 978-0-8091-4134-0.
- Chadwick, Owen (2003). "Chapter 1". A History of the Popes, 1830-1914. New York: Oxford University Press. pp. 1–61. ISBN 978-0-19-926286-1.
- Francesca Longo; Claudia Zaccagnini; Fabrizio Fabbrini (2008). Gregorio XVI promotore delle arti e della cultura (in Italian). Ospedaletto (Pisa): Pacini. ISBN 978-88-7781-950-5. (laudatory)
- von Wurzbach, Constantin (1857). "Cappellari, Bartholomäus Albert". Biographisches Lexikon des Kaiserthums Oesterreich (in German). Vol. 2. Vienna: Verlag der typografisch-literarisch-artistischen Anstalt (L. C. Zamarski, C. Dittmarsch & Comp.). p. 275.
- Friedrich Wilhelm Bautz (1990). "Gregor XVI". In Bautz, Friedrich Wilhelm (ed.). Biographisch-Bibliographisches Kirchenlexikon (BBKL) (in German). Vol. 2. Hamm: Bautz. cols. 327–330. ISBN 3-88309-032-8.
- Giacomo Martina: Gregorio XVI. In: Massimo Bray (ed.): Enciclopedia dei Papi. Volume 3: Innocenzo VIII, Giovanni Paolo II. Istituto della Enciclopedia Italiana, Rome 2000 (treccani.it)
- Martina, Giacomo (2002). "Gregorio XVI, papa". In Caravale, Mario (ed.). Dizionario Biografico degli Italiani (DBI) (in Italian). Vol. 59. Rome: Istituto della Enciclopedia Italiana.
- Literature by and about Pope Gregory XVI in the German National Library catalogue

Catholic Church titles
Preceded by Giulio Maria della Somaglia	Prefect of the Congregation for the Propagation of the Faith; 1 October 1826 – 2 February 1831	Succeeded by Carlo Maria Pedicini
Preceded by Pius VIII	Pope; 2 February 1831 – 1 June 1846	Succeeded by Pius IX
