= Hyacinthe-Louis de Quélen =

Catholic bishop

His Grace Hyacinthe-Louis de Quélen COHS
- Archbishop of Paris, Peer of France
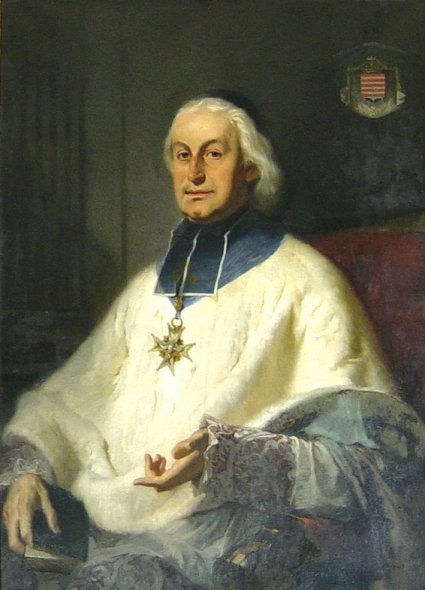
- Church: Roman Catholic Church
- Archdiocese: Paris
- See: Notre-Dame de Paris
- Installed: 20 October 1821
- Term ended: 31 December 1839
- Predecessor: Alexandre-Angélique Talleyrand de Périgord
- Successor: Denis Auguste Affre
- Other post: Vicar-General of Paris

Personal details
- Born: 8 October 1778 Paris, France
- Died: 31 December 1839 (aged 61) Paris, France
- Education: College of Navarre, Paris
- Coat of arms

Member of the Chamber of Peers
- In office 31 October 1822 – 31 August 1830

Hyacinthe-Louis De Quélen (8 October 1778 – 31 December 1839) was an Archbishop of Paris. He was the fourth archbishop to serve the Paris diocese after the restoration of the French hierarchy in 1802.

== Biography ==
De Quélen was born in Paris, in the Quélen noble Breton family. His motto "Em Pob Emser Quelen" and the older Breton expression for "Better death than dishonour" figure in stained glass in the Lazarist church in the rue de Sèvres. He was educated at the College of Navarre and the seminary in St. Sulpice.

Ordained in 1807, he served a year as Vicar-General of Saint-Brieuc and then became secretary to Joseph Fesch, uncle to the Emperor Napoleon. When the latter was exiled from his diocese of Lyon under the Bourbon Restoration, de Quélen exercised his ministry at Saint-Sulpice and in the military hospitals. Under the Bourbons, he became successively spiritual director of the schools in the archdiocese, Vicar-General of Paris, and coadjutor archbishop to the Cardinal de Talleyrand-Périgord, succeeding the latter in 1821.

A good preacher, he was favored by Louis XVIII and then Charles X, but retained some measure of independence. As a peer of the realm he opposed, on behalf of the middle classes, the conversion of the national debt. At his reception into the Académie française he publicly lauded Chateaubriand, then in disgrace. While blessing the cornerstone of the Chapelle Expiatoire, he requested in vain an amnesty for the exiled members of the Convention. The ordinance of 1828, disbanding the Jesuits and limiting the recruiting of the clergy, was also issued against his advice.

Although de Quélen had not approved of the royal ordinance of July 1830, which aimed at restoring absolute monarchy and instead triggered the July Revolution, he was nevertheless held in suspicion of legitimism by the House of Orléans. On one occasion Louis-Philippe I said to him: "Archbishop, remember that more than one mitre has been torn asunder". "Sire", replied the archbishop, "God protect the crown of the king, for many royal crowns too have been shattered".

Apart from official functions such as the christening of the Comte de Paris, the funeral of the Duke of Orléans and the Te Deum sung in honour of the French victory in Africa, he confined himself to visiting the parishes of the diocese, looking after the religious instruction of military recruits, and organizing his clergy. In the outbreaks which followed the Revolution of 1830 the archbishop was twice driven from his palace by mobs. However, when the epidemic of 1832 broke out, he transformed his seminaries into hospitals, personally ministered to the sick at the Hôtel-Dieu, and founded at his own expense the "Oeuvre des orphelins du choléra".

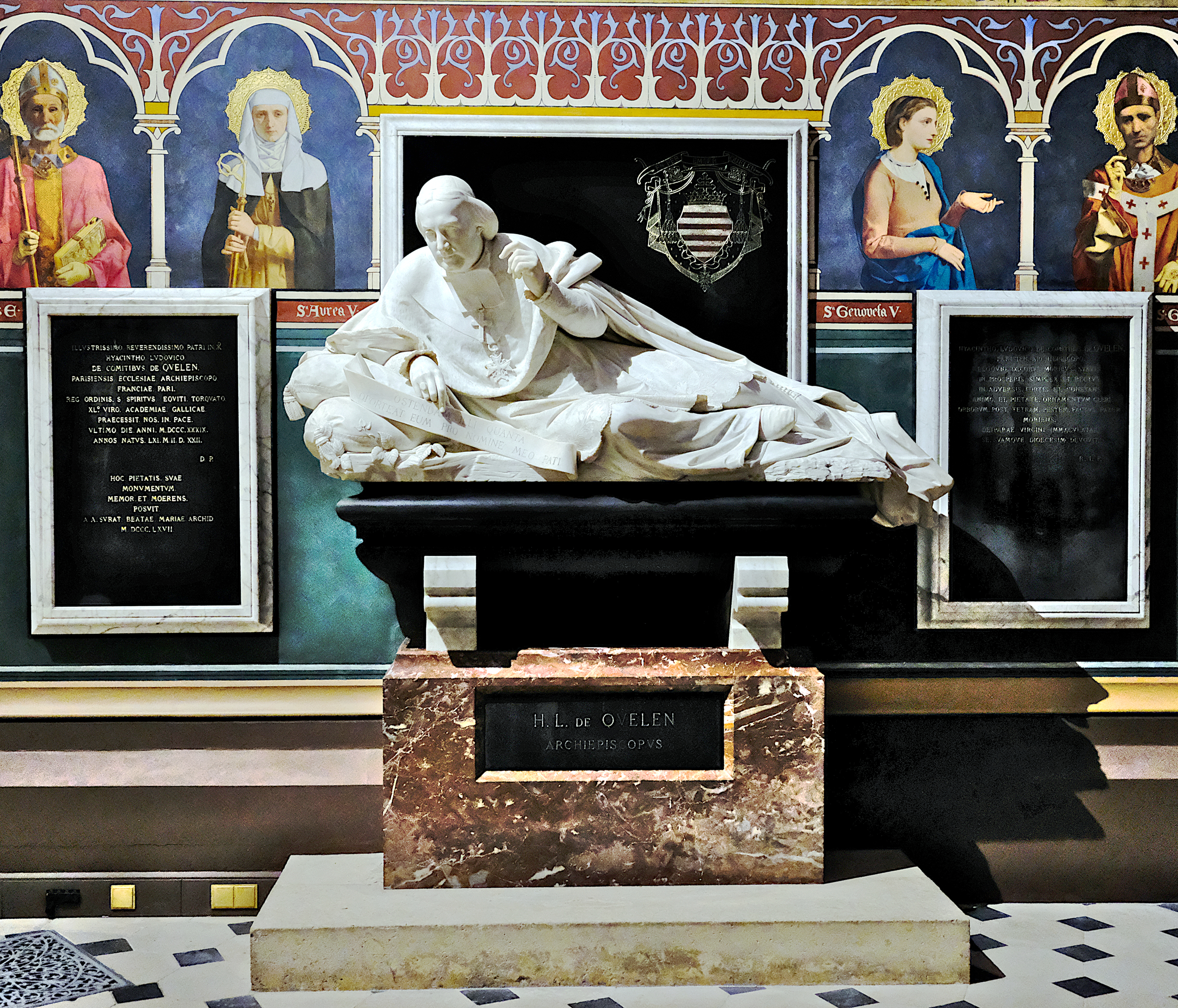
Hyacinthe-Louis de Quélen's tomb.

He is also remembered for denying the Last Sacraments to the dying Henri Grégoire unless the latter would retract his oath to the Civil Constitution of the Clergy, which Grégoire refused to do.

De Quélen himself died shortly after, having witnessed the conversion of the apostate Bishop of Autun, the Prince de Talleyrand, whose sincerity was later questioned. Ravignan eulogized him at Notre-Dame, and Louis-Mathieu Molé at the Académie française. From de Quélen's episcopate date the "Société de St. Vincent de Paul," the "Conferences apologétiques de Notre-Dame" and several religious institutes, among which are the nursing Sisters of Bon-Secours.

== Legacy ==
Besides the eulogies on Louis XVI (Paris, 1816), on Madame Elizabeth (Paris, 1817), on the Duke of Berry (Paris, 1830), his "Discours de réception à l'académie française" (Paris, 1824), and some 120 pastoral letters, there are the "Manuels pour l'administration des Sacrements de l'Eucharistie et de l'Extrême-Onction: du Baptême des Enfants: du Marriage" (3 vols., Paris, 1837–38) collected in the "Rituel de Paris".

Catholic Church titles
| Preceded by Alexandre Angélique de Talleyrand-Périgord | Archbishop of Paris; 1821–1839 | Succeeded by Denis Auguste Affre |
