= Casimir de Scorbiac =

French clergyman and educator (1796–1846)

Reverend Father Bruno Charles Casimir de Scorbiac
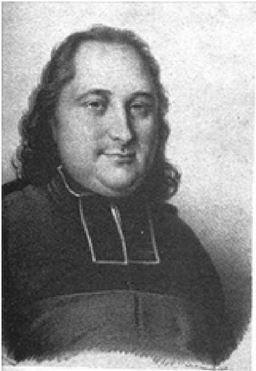

Personal life
- Born: 4 March 1796 Montauban, France
- Died: 1 October 1846 (aged 50) Montauban, France
- Occupation: Catholic priest, educator, missionary

Religious life
- Religion: Christianity

Bruno Charles Casimir de Scorbiac (4 March 1796 – 1 October 1846) was a French Catholic priest, missionary, and educator.

== Biography ==
=== Early life and family ===
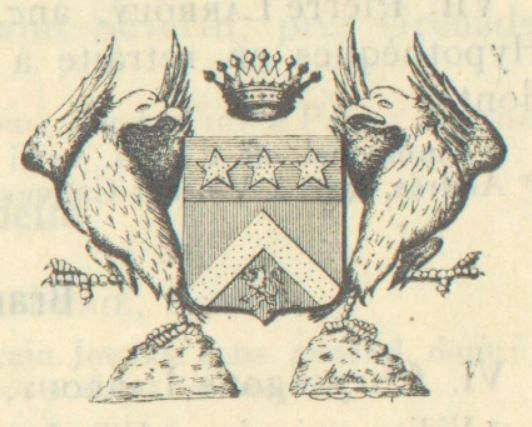
Family coat of arms of Scorbiac

Born into a noble family from Tarn-et-Garonne, Casimir was the third child of Jean-Jacques Maurice de Scorbiac and Marie Alies. The couple had four children: Coralie (1784–1855), Amé Jean Guichard Bruno (1786–1861), Casimir, and Maurice (1797–1849).

=== Education and priesthood ===
Casimir pursued his early education at the institution of Abbé Claude Rosalie Liautard (which later became the Collège Stanislas de Paris in 1822). Initially intending to join the École Polytechnique, he changed direction and entered the Saint-Sulpice Seminary in October 1815, at age 19.

He was ordained as a Catholic priest in 1820 and joined the Society of the Missionaries of France, founded by Abbé Jean-Baptiste Rauzan. His declined a canonry in the Diocese of Quimper offered by his uncle Bishop Pierre-Vincent Dombidau de Crouseilles.

=== University chaplaincy ===
In 1823, while conducting a retreat at the Royal College of Rouen, Casimir's eloquence caught the attention of the rector who informed Denis Frayssinous, then Grand Master of the University. Frayssinous appointed him to a new role, Chaplain of the University which allowed him to organize spiritual retreats across France’s royal colleges. In 1825, he conducted a retreat at Lycée Henri-IV, earning the respect and gratitude of students who gifted him a painting of Saint Thomas Aquinas.

=== Director of Juilly College ===
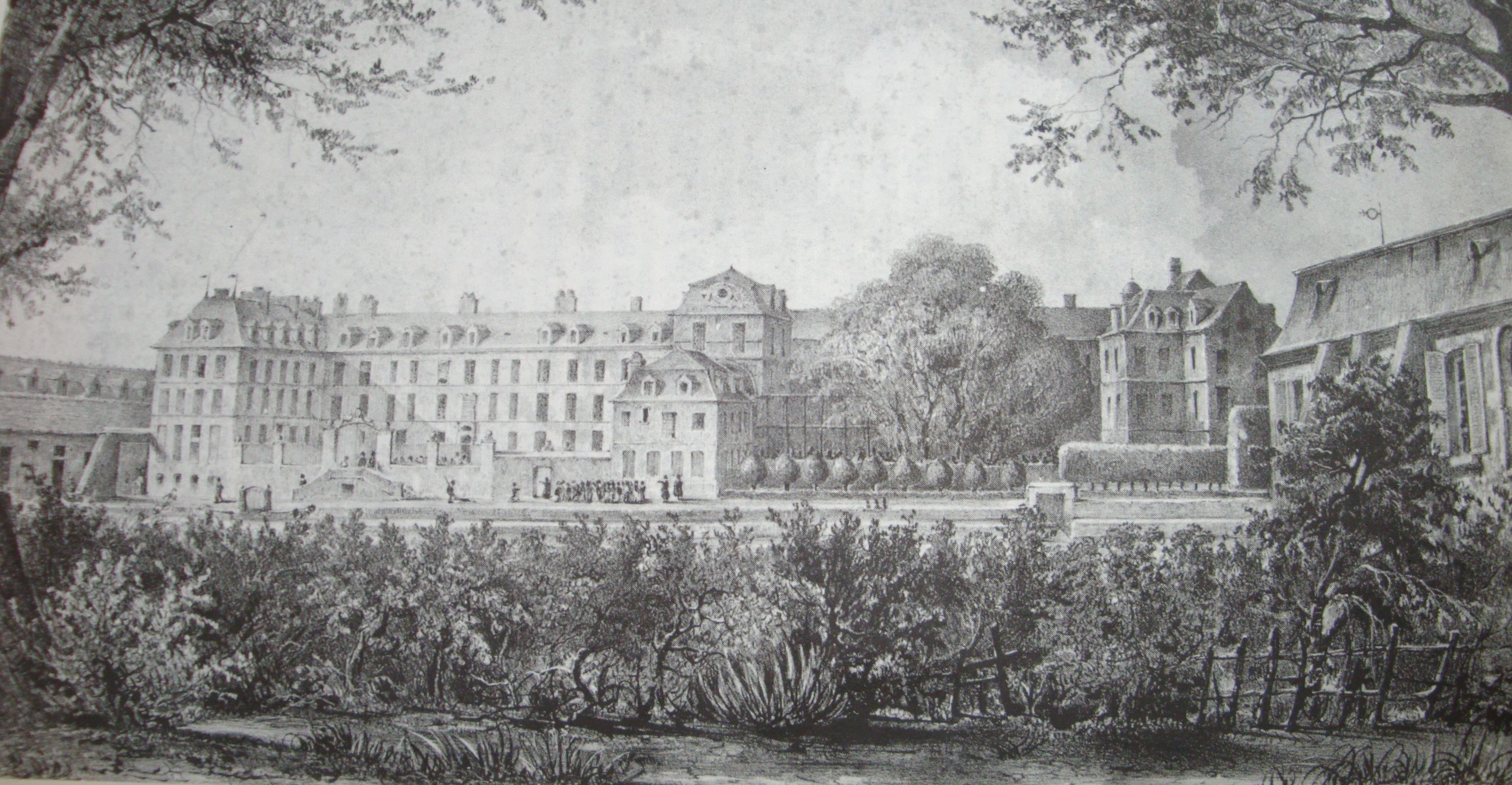
Juilly College, engraving from 1824

In 1828, Scorbiac became co-director of the Collège de Juilly with Antoine de Salinis. They implemented innovative educational practices, emphasizing student freedom and personal responsibility. By 1829, enrollment rose to 300 students, predominantly from affluent families.

=== Later life ===
In 1841, Scorbiac became Vicar General of Bordeaux, where he organized theological discussions and led a girls’ boarding school as chaplain. He died in Montauban on 1 October 1846.

== Publications ==
- Précis de l'histoire de la philosophie, with Philippe Gerbet and Antoine de Salinis. Paris: L. Hachette, 1841.
