= Antoine de Salinis =

French Catholic bishop (1798–1861)

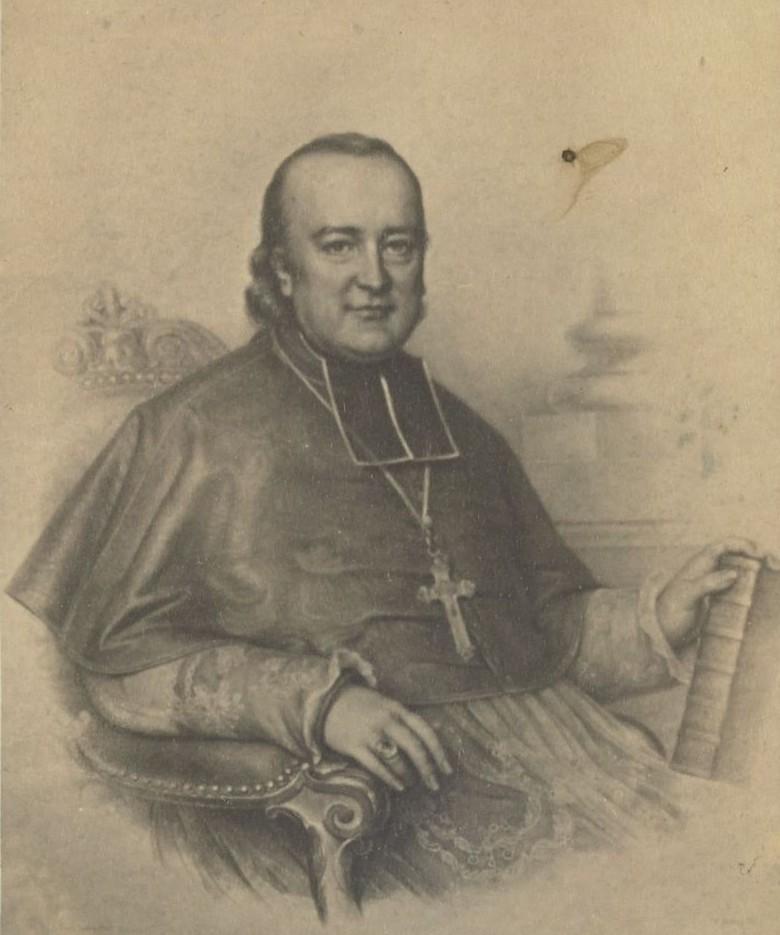

Personal details
- Motto: "Sic Sale Vivesco"
- Coat of arms

Antoine de Salinis (born August 11, 1798, in Morlaàs and died January 30, 1861, in Auch was a Bishop of Amiens from 1849 to 1856, and later Archbishop of Auch until 1861.

== Biography ==
=== Early life and education ===
Antoine de Salinis was born on August 11, 1798, in Morlaàs, the former capital of Béarn. His parents, Jacques de Salinis and Catherine de Bousquet, were part of one of the province's oldest families, which had provided several bishops. His father was a canon of Lescar Cathedral before his marriage.

Around the age of eight, his education was entrusted to Abbé Lacoste, the parish priest of Momuy, where Antoine resided at the Château de Momuy, owned by one of his maternal uncles.

At ten, he began studying at the college in Aire-sur-l'Adour and later entered the Seminary of Saint-Sulpice in 1815. Recognized for his talents, he was appointed head catechist from 1822 to 1828. He was ordained a priest on August 11, 1822.

=== Collaboration with Félicité de La Mennais ===
During his time at Saint-Sulpice, Salinis met Félicité de La Mennais, who was known for his work "Essai sur l'indifférence en matière de religion". Salinis became one of La Mennais's main collaborators, exchanging remarks and even presenting a lecture at the Sorbonne on the concept of "common sense" that La Mennais advocated.

This collaboration extended to Salinis contributing to La Mennais's subsequent works and furthering the philosophical and theological ideas of the time.

=== Chaplaincy at Lycée Henri-IV ===
Denis Frayssinous, Grand Master of the University of France, appointed Salinis as the chaplain of Lycée Henri-IV. There, Salinis established a series of religious conferences covering topics such as the divinity of Christianity, the divine authority of the Church, and religion's relationship with temporal order.

=== Founding of Le Mémorial catholique (1824) ===
In January 1824, alongside Philippe Gerbet, Salinis co-founded Le Mémorial catholique, a periodical devoted to Catholic doctrine and its integration into literature, philosophy, and theology. The initiative gained the support of notable figures like Félicité de La Mennais, Louis de Bonald, and others. Salinis contributed to several articles, some signed and others anonymous.

=== Leadership at the Collège de Juilly (1828–1841) ===
With Abbé Casimir de Scorbiac, Salinis acquired the Collège de Juilly in 1828, where they tried then innovative educational practices to foster a more dynamic environment. Despite challenges during the July Revolution of 1830 Salinis and his collaborators revitalized the institution by introducing members of the Congregation of Saint Peter.

=== Bishop of Amiens (1849–1856) ===
Appointed as Bishop of Amiens in 1849, Salinis worked on the restoration of Amiens Cathedral and participated in two regional councils in Reims and Amiens. In 1854, he attended the proclamation of the Immaculate Conception dogma in Rome, where he also negotiated the return of relics of Theudosia of Amiens.

=== Archbishop of Auch (1856–1861) ===
As Archbishop of Auch, Salinis expanded theological studies and established a retirement fund for infirm priests. He founded the Historical Society of Gascony to document local history and heritage. Salinis died in Auch on January 30, 1861, and his funeral oration was delivered by Philippe Gerbet.

== Coat of arms and motto ==
His coat of arms bore "Argent, a green tree on a terrace of the same, flanked by a sable bear scattering gold salt." His motto was "Sic Sale Vivesco" ("Thus I thrive with salt").

== See also ==
- Catholic Church in France
- List of Archbishops of Auch
