= Royal Council of Public Instruction (1820–1845) =

- Conseil royal de l'instruction publique
- Predecessor: Commission of Public Instruction (France)
- Successor: Royal Council of the University
- Formation: 1820
- Dissolved: 1845
- Headquarters: Paris, France
- President: See list below

The Royal Council of Public Instruction (French: Conseil royal de l'instruction publique) was a public instruction authority in France that existed from 1820 to 1845. It succeeded the Commission of Public Instruction and was replaced by the Royal Council of the University.

== Organization and functions ==
The royal ordinances of November 1, 1820, and February 27, 1821, restructured the Commission of Public Instruction, renaming it the Royal Council of Public Instruction.

The ordinances stated: "The Royal Council of Public Instruction shall regain the rank and attire of the former University Council."

The president's role was enhanced. The president alone corresponded with the government, received official letters, signed diplomas, payment orders, deliberations, decrees, appointments, and dispatches. They appointed officials on the council's advice and managed the employment of office workers.

Within the council: - A chancellor signed diplomas, deliberations, decrees, and appointments and handled reports on faculties (excluding Catholic theology) and specialized schools. - A treasurer managed financial duties. - Other councilors were responsible for royal and communal colleges, served as rector of the University of Paris, or oversaw Catholic theology faculties and religious institutions. - The secretary-general was also a councilor.

== Appointment ==
Members were appointed by the king from three candidates proposed by the president, on the council's advice, selected from individuals deemed most distinguished in public instruction.

== Composition of the council ==
=== Functions ===
==== Presidents ====
- November 1, 1820 – December 20, 1820: Joseph-Henri-Joachim Lainé (did not serve); interim president: Georges Cuvier
- December 21, 1820 – July 31, 1821: Jacques-Joseph Corbière (minister-secretary of state)
- July 31, 1821 – May 31, 1822: Georges Cuvier (interim)

From June 1, 1822, the council was presided over by the grand master of the university (a position recreated in 1822), who also became minister-secretary of state for public instruction from August 26, 1824.

The five longest-serving minister-grand masters from 1822 to 1845 were:

- Denis Frayssinous (5.5 years)
- Antoine Lefebvre de Vatimesnil (1.5 years)
- Camille de Montalivet (1 year)
- François Guizot (4 years)
- Narcisse-Achille de Salvandy (5 years)
- Abel-François Villemain (5 years, previously vice president)

==== Vice presidents ====
- 1824–1825: Claude-Bernard Petitot (director of public instruction)
- 1825–1830: Joseph-Gaspard-Dieudonné Charpit de Courville (director of public instruction)
- 1830–1839: Abel-François Villemain (appointed minister)
- 1840–1845: Louis Jacques Thénard

==== Chancellors ====
- 1820–1832: Georges Cuvier (interim: Guéneau 1821–1822)
- 1832–1834: Philibert Guéneau de Mussy
- 1834–1845: Ambroise Rendu

==== Treasurers ====
- 1820–1822: Antoine-Isaac Silvestre de Sacy
- 1822–1840: Siméon Denis Poisson
- 1840–1845: Louis Poinsot

==== Secretaries ====
- 1820–1824: Claude-Bernard Petitot
- 1824–1830: Louis-Urbain de Maussion
- 1830–1839: Victor Cousin
- 1839–1845: Saint-Marc Girardin

=== Members ===
- Georges Cuvier (1820–1832)
- Philibert Guéneau de Mussy (1820–1834)
- Ambroise Rendu (1820–1845)
- Siméon Denis Poisson (1820–1840)
- Louis Poinsot (1840–1845)
- Victor Cousin (1830–1840, 1842–1845)
- Louis Jacques Thénard (1830–1845)
- Saint-Marc Girardin (1838–1845)

== See also ==
- Commission of Public Instruction (France)
