= Commission of Public Instruction =

- Commission de l'instruction publique
- Successor: Royal Council of Public Instruction (1820–1845)
- Formation: 1815
- Dissolved: 1820
- Key people: Pierre-Paul Royer-Collard, Georges Cuvier, Philibert Guéneau de Mussy, Antoine-Isaac Silvestre de Sacy, Dominique Eliçagaray
- Parent organisation: Ministry of the Interior (France)

In France, the Commission of Public Instruction (French: Commission de l'instruction publique) was a body responsible for directing national education from 1815 to 1820. Its five principal members were Pierre-Paul Royer-Collard (president), Georges Cuvier, Philibert Guéneau de Mussy, Antoine-Isaac Silvestre de Sacy, and Abbé Dominique Eliçagaray. It was replaced by the Royal Council of Public Instruction (1820–1845).

== Historical context ==
During the First Bourbon Restoration, after a brief continuation of the grand master of the university Louis de Fontanes (April 9, 1814), Louis XVIII abolished the office of Grand Master and the University Council by royal ordinance on February 17, 1815. Oversight of education was entrusted to a Royal Council of Public Instruction, chaired by Louis-François de Bausset.

Napoleon's return to Paris on March 20, 1815, dissolved this short-lived Royal Council and reinstated the grand master of the university, first as Bernard Germain de Lacépède and later Charles-François Lebrun on May 9, 1815.

Following the Second Bourbon Restoration, Louis XVIII issued an ordinance on August 15, 1815, to maintain the structure of the University of France but introduced changes at its leadership.

== Functions of the commission ==
According to Article 3 of the August 15, 1815 ordinance, the Commission of Public Instruction, composed of five members, exercised powers previously attributed to the grand master, university council, chancellor, and treasurer. The commission also fulfilled the duties of rector for the University of Paris and served as an academic council. It managed the assets, rights, and revenues that formed the university's endowment.

== Role of the president ==
The president of the commission was responsible for issuing diplomas, approving salaries, and pensions.

== Formation of the first commission ==
Louis XVIII appointed the five members of the commission in its founding ordinance:

- Pierre-Paul Royer-Collard, 52, a member of the Council of State, professor at the University of Paris, and former member of the first Royal Council of Public Instruction, was named president.
- Georges Cuvier, 46, a member of the Council of State, professor at the Muséum and Collège de France, former life councilor of the University Council, and member of the first Royal Council, was appointed as chancellor.
- Other members included:
  - Antoine-Isaac Silvestre de Sacy, 56, professor at the Collège de France and former rector of the University of Paris during the First Restoration.
  - Denis Frayssinous, 50, inspector general of studies.
  - Philibert Guéneau de Mussy, 39, former ordinary councilor of the University Council and inspector general of studies.

The commission's secretary-general was **Claude-Bernard Petitot**, inspector general of studies.

== Changes in Composition ==
In April 1816, Frayssinous, in conflict with Royer-Collard, resigned and was replaced by Abbé Dominique Eliçagaray. Royer-Collard resigned on August 20, 1819, and Cuvier temporarily assumed the presidency. In June 1820, Royer-Collard left the commission after his removal from the Council of State.

A royal ordinance on July 22, 1820, increased the commission's membership to seven. Three new members were added: Dominique-Charles Nicolle, Ambroise Rendu, and Siméon Denis Poisson. On October 4, 1820, Joseph-Henri-Joachim Lainé was named president, but, as he had not been consulted, he did not assume the role, leaving Cuvier to continue as interim president.

== Dissolution of the commission ==
A royal ordinance on November 1, 1820, restructured the commission as the Royal Council of Public Instruction (1820–1845), granting the council's president some of the previous prerogatives of the grand master of the university.

== Members ==
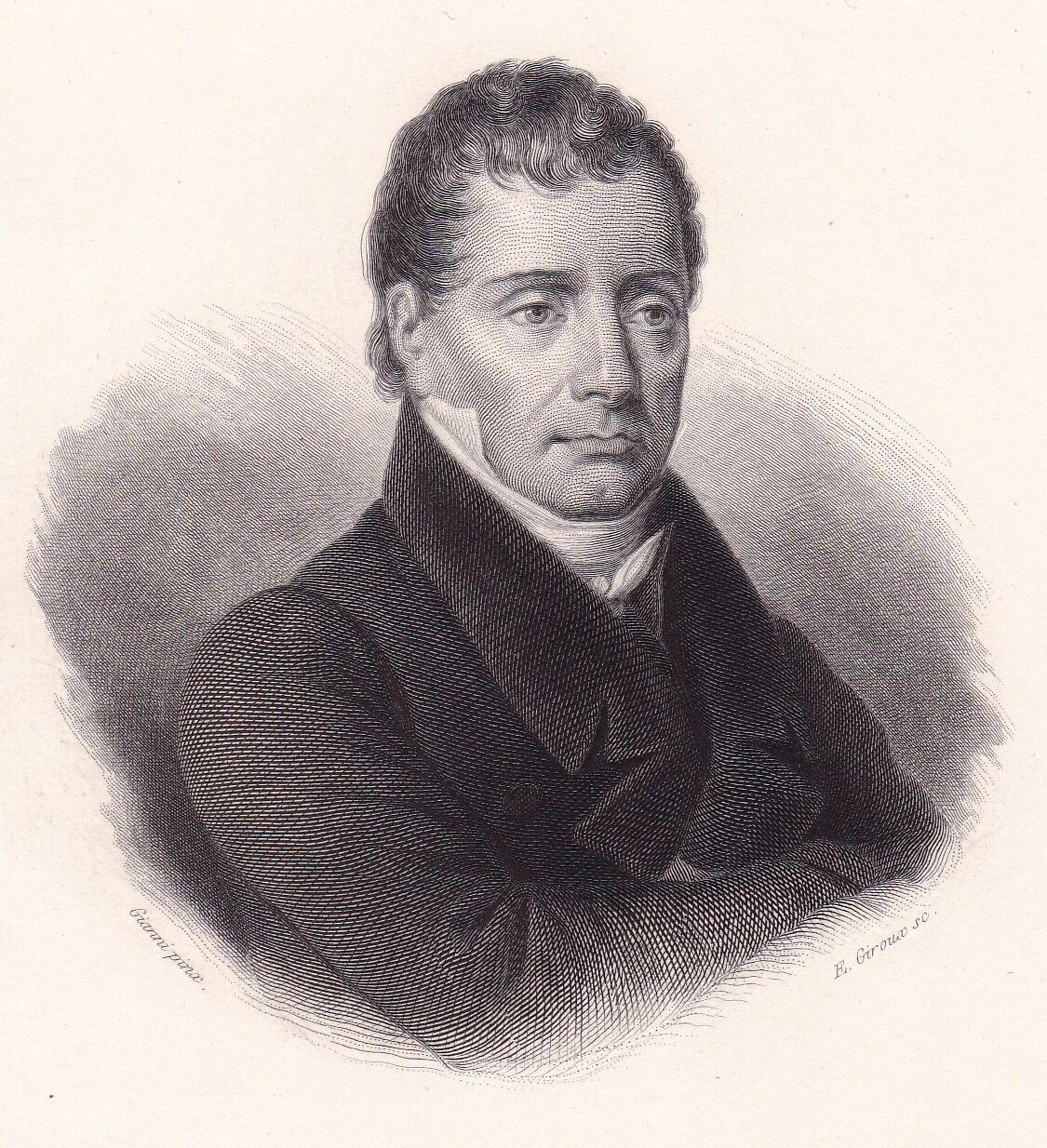
Pierre-Paul Royer-Collard, president of the commission

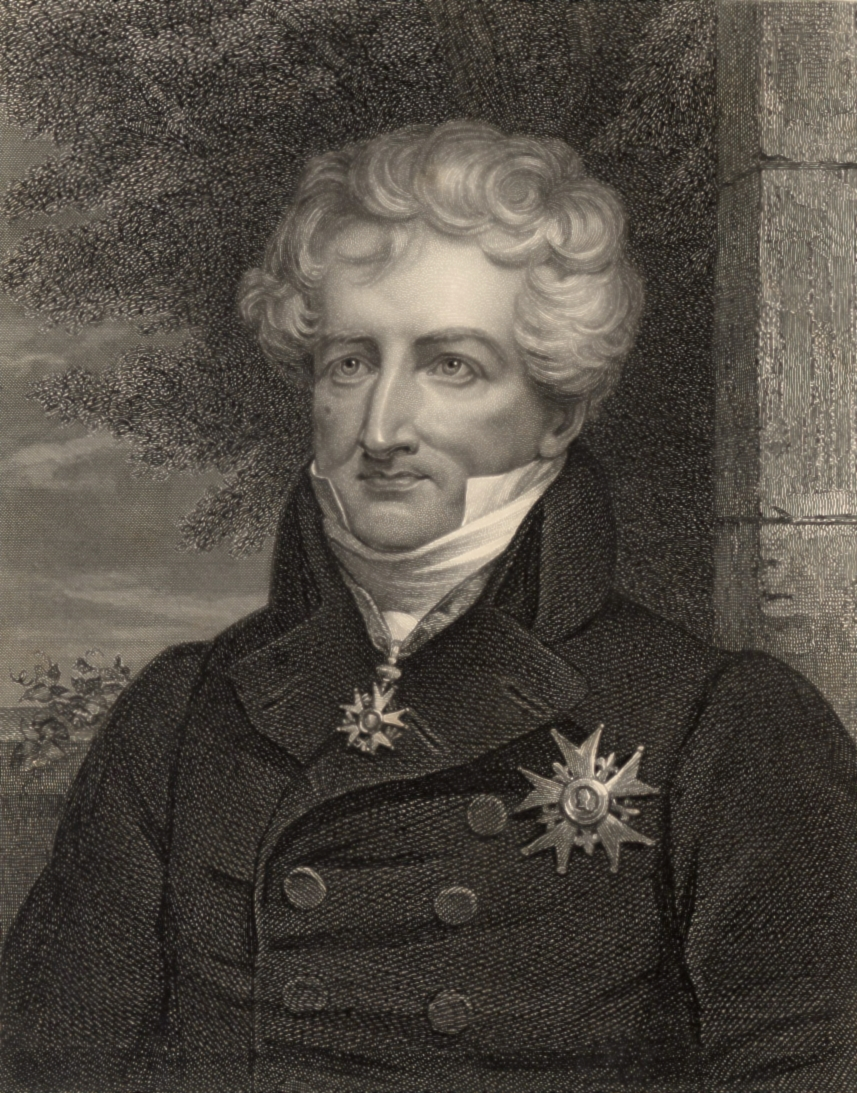
Georges Cuvier, member responsible for chancellor duties, interim president

=== President ===
- Pierre-Paul Royer-Collard (August 15, 1815 – September 13, 1819)
- Georges Cuvier (interim, September 14, 1819 – October 2, 1820)
- Joseph-Henri-Joachim Lainé (October 2, 1820 – October 30, 1820, replaced by Cuvier as interim)

=== Chancellor ===
- Georges Cuvier (August 15, 1815 – September 13, 1819)
- Philibert Guéneau de Mussy (interim, September 14, 1819 – October 30, 1820)

=== Other members ===
- Philibert Guéneau de Mussy (August 15, 1815 – October 30, 1820)
- Pierre-Paul Royer-Collard (August 15, 1815 – June 1820)
- Dominique-Charles Nicolle (July 22, 1820 – October 30, 1820)
- Antoine-Isaac Silvestre de Sacy (August 15, 1815 – October 30, 1820)
- Denis Frayssinous (August 15, 1815 – April 1816)
- Dominique Eliçagaray (May 1816 – October 30, 1820)
- Ambroise Rendu (July 22, 1820 – October 30, 1820)
- Siméon Denis Poisson (July 22, 1820 – October 30, 1820)

=== Secretary-general ===
- Claude-Bernard Petitot (August 15, 1815 – October 30, 1820)
