= Ambroise Rendu =

Ambroise Rendu may refer to:

- Ambroise Rendu (educator)
- Ambroise Rendu (politician)
