= Vanel =

Vanel is a surname. Notable people with the surname include:

- Charles Vanel (1892–1989), French actor and director
- Clyde Vanel, American politician and member of the New York Assembly from the 33rd District
- Gabriel Vanel (1925–2013), Roman Catholic archbishop of the Archdiocese of Auch, France
