= Le Mémorial catholique =

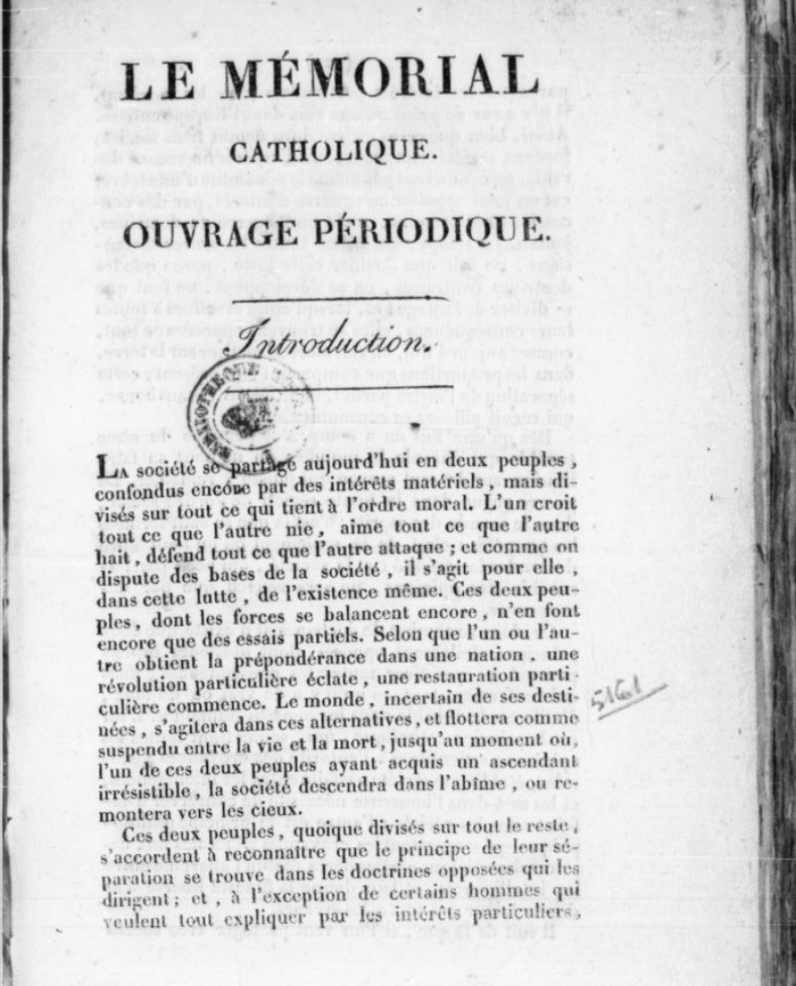
- Type: General information
- Format: Monthly
- Founded: January 1, 1824
- Ceased publication: August 1830
- Language: French
- Headquarters: Paris
- Country: France
- Circulation: National

Le Mémorial catholique was a French journal established in January 1824 by Abbés Philippe Gerbet and Antoine de Salinis. Aimed at French monarchists who had become or were recognized as liberals, it ceased publication in August 1830.

== Editorial line ==
The project was initiated by Antoine de Salinis, then chaplain at the Lycée Henri IV, and his colleague Philippe Gerbet, who served as assistant chaplain at the same institution. Their primary aim was to create a journal addressing societal debates linked to the Catholic religion, a theme not directly explored by political newspapers of the time. While publications like L'Ami du roi et de la religion covered religious themes, they did not delve deeply enough into the subjects. Salinis and Gerbet envisioned a more substantial journal, akin to those already present in other European countries.

The journal's editorial line was outlined in a prospectus preceding its first issue: "to thoroughly understand, from all perspectives, the current state of the human mind in religion, philosophy, and literature. This uncommon knowledge is of utmost importance. To influence one's era, one must comprehend it." A secondary goal was to analyze or refute "all works, whether religious or heterodox, published in Europe that deserve attention".

The founders sought support for their initiative, gaining the endorsement of Félicité de La Mennais, who had risen to fame with his work Essai sur l'indifférence. Salinis and La Mennais were acquainted, as Salinis had been one of the principal reviewers of the second volume of Essai, contributing to the dissemination of the philosophical doctrine of "common sense" championed by the Mennaisian school.

Notable contributors included Louis de Bonald, Charles-Louis de Haller and Count O'Mahony, along with a cohort of young scholars who would later pursue ecclesiastical or academic careers, such as Abbés Thomas Gousset, René François Rohrbacher, Jean-Marie Doney, and Prosper Guéranger. Henri Lacordaire also contributed articles before becoming a priest

Certain writings published in Le Mémorial catholique were later revisited. For instance, Abbé Guéranger raised concerns about the illegitimacy of particular liturgies inconsistent with the intentions of the sovereign pontiffs, emphasizing unity with Rome. This debate, initially discussed in the journal, was later integral to the reflections on restoring the Order of Saint Benedict.

== Opposition and support ==
The journal faced criticism from numerous bishops and distinguished ecclesiastics, who vehemently opposed its philosophical doctrines. These critics argued that the journal propagated "false and dangerous philosophical doctrines, introduced novelties, and sowed disorder within the clergy." Among its detractors was Abbé Michel Armand Claussel de Coussergue, a member of the Royal Council of Public Instruction.

However, the journal also garnered support from certain prelates, such as Archbishop Charles François d'Aviau du Bois de Sanzay of Bordeaux and Abbé Denys Affre, Vicar General of Amiens. Many sympathizers praised its content.

== Content themes ==
One focus of the journal was exposing the prevalence of Enlightenment philosophy in literature. It published statistics on the dissemination of so-called "bad books," including works by Voltaire, Rousseau, and Diderot, which it labeled as irreligious. The authors lamented the disproportionate influence of 18th-century philosophy on contemporary literature, overshadowing religious and spiritual texts.

== Publication details ==
Each issue consisted of four printed pages, released around the 15th of each month, beginning January 15, 1824. Subscription rates were set at 8 francs for six months and 15 francs for a year within France, with a 20-franc rate for international subscriptions.

== Editorial offices ==
The journal's editorial offices changed locations several times. Initially based near Saint-Sulpice at 9 Rue de Mézières, it moved to 35 Rue Cassette from 1824 to 1826, then to 70 Rue Mazarine in 1827, and finally to 5 Rue des Beaux-Arts, near Rue de Seine, from 1828 to 1830.

== See also ==
History of newspapers in France
