= Frayssinous =

Frayssinous is a French surname. Notable people with the surname include:

- Laurent Frayssinous (born 1977), French rugby league footballer and coach
- Denis-Luc Frayssinous (1765–1841), French prelate and statesman, orator, and writer
