= Salinis family =

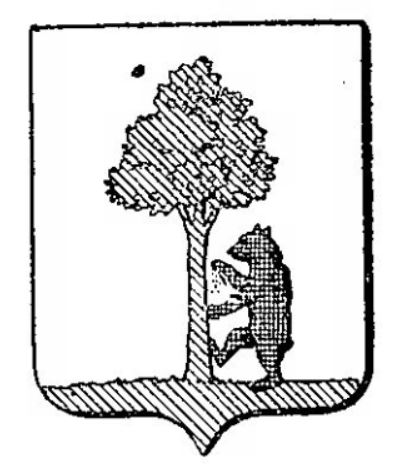
- Current region: Salies, Morlaàs - Béarn
- Titles: Bishop (Dax, Lescar, Amiens); Officer of the King; Advocate-General at the Chancery of Navarre; Lieutenant-Colonel in the Régiment de Piémont
- Motto: Sic sale vivesco
- Estates: Château noble of Salies, Seigneury of Gers, Vicomté of Saderac, Noble land of Lème

The Salinis family, descended from the Salies family, is a noble house established in Béarn since the Ancien Régime.

== Origins ==
=== Establishment in Salies-en-Béarn ===
The Salinis or Salies family consists of two branches of the same lineage. It originated in the town of Salies in Béarn. This tradition is confirmed by a hereditary right to the saline fountain in Salies-de-Béarn, enjoyed by the elder branch until its extinction. In 1821, Charles and Antoine de Salinis authored a report for the Administrative Commission of the Saline Fountain in Salies, requesting their inclusion in the distribution of its waters. This resource was managed by the Corporation of "Part-Prenants" since 1587, governed by egalitarian customs based on territorial and hereditary rights · . The commission ruled in favor of the Salinis family on May 3, 1823.

=== Salies and Salinis: One Family ===
The name "Salinis" derives from "Salies". In Béarn, it was customary for cadet branches of a family to Latinize their name's ending to distinguish themselves from the senior branch. The cadet branch thrived while the elder branch became extinct.

=== A Noble Family ===
In Béarn, nobility was determined by land ownership rather than lineage. Noble status could be acquired by purchasing noble land or receiving it as a fief in exchange for service or an oath. Members of this family held prominent positions "in the Church, the military, and the judiciary".

== Notable Members ==
- Gallard or Guilelmus de Salies, Bishop of Dax (1215–1234).
- Arnauld V, Bishop of Lescar in 1427.
- Jean Duhau de Salies, Bishop of Lescar (1658–1681), who swore allegiance to the king in 1659.
- Louis-Antoine de Salinis, theorist of "common sense," Bishop of Amiens, and Archbishop of Auch.

== Coat of Arms ==
The Salinis family's arms bear similarities to those of Salies town, featuring a natural bear climbing a green beech tree and scattering salt. Their motto is "Sic sale vivesco" ("Thus I thrive with salt").

== Bibliography ==
- Ladoue, Casimir de (1873). Vie de Mgr de Salinis. Tolra.
- Picamilh, Charles de (1858). "Salies ou Salinis (de)". Statistique des Basses-Pyrénées. Vol. 1. pp. 538–547.
- Régis de Saint-Jouan (1952). Le nom de famille en Béarn et ses origines. Revue internationale d'onomastique. doi:10.3406/rio.1952.1297.
- Mailhol, Camille Philippe Dayre de (1895–1897). Dictionnaire historique et héraldique de la noblesse française.
- Saint-Allais, Nicolas Viton de (1872–1878). Nobiliaire universel de France, ou Recueil général des généalogies historiques des maisons nobles de ce royaume , Recueil général des généalies historiques des maisons nobles de ce royaume. Vol. 8. Paris: Bachelin-Deflorenne.
