= Grand Master of the University of France =

In France, during the first half of the 19th century, the grand master of the university (French: Grand-maître de l'Université) was a position and title associated with the head of the University of France. In some respects, it was the precursor to the Ministry of National Education (France).

== The grand master of the university under the First French Empire ==
The decree of March 17, 1808, placed a "grand master of the university" at the head of the Imperial University, created two years earlier by Napoleon. The grand master held the highest rank among the officials of the Imperial University (Article 29) and bore the title of "Titular of the Imperial University" (Article 34).

According to the articles of the decree:

- The Imperial University was governed by the grand master, who was appointed and removable by the emperor.
- He swore an oath before the emperor, following the same ceremonial as archbishops (decree of September 17, 1808).
- The grand master appointed administrative positions, chairs at colleges and lycées, academy officers, and university officials, as well as making all promotions within the teaching corps.
- He allocated chairs in faculties following competitive examinations, the procedures for which were determined by the university council.
- He managed scholarships and admissions to lycées.
- He granted teaching permissions to graduates meeting regulatory requirements.
- He presented the emperor with an annual report on educational establishments and the status of university personnel.
- He could impose disciplinary measures, including reprimand, censure, suspension, and transfer.
- The grand master ratified academic degrees and diplomas, organized university council sessions, and issued diplomas bearing the university seal.

The first grand master was Louis de Fontanes, appointed by Napoleon. A Catholic, Fontanes promoted the return of the Church in public education and worked with notable figures like Jacques-André Émery and the philosopher Louis de Bonald. Fontanes oversaw a council of advisors, including ecclesiastics like the Abbé de Bausset.

=== Grand Master's Attire ===
According to the decree of July 31, 1809, the grand master's ceremonial costume included a purple silk simarre, a belt with gold tassels, a robe edged with ermine, and a lace cravat. A violet toque bordered with gold completed the outfit.

== Survival of the position under the Bourbon Restoration and July Monarchy ==
Under King Louis XVIII, the grand master was initially retained until the royal ordinance of February 17, 1815, which dissolved the University of France and abolished the grand master and university council. During Napoleon's Hundred Days, the Imperial University and the grand master were reinstated. Following Louis XVIII's return, the university was maintained but the grand master and council were replaced by a Commission of Public Instruction.

In 1822, Louis XVIII restored the position, appointing Denis Frayssinous as grand master. By 1824, the grand master became secretary of state for the Department of Ecclesiastical Affairs and Public Instruction. Under the July Monarchy, the council of the university grew in importance, with a royal ordinance of 1845 reinstating the structure of 1808.

== Decline of the position ==
Following the French Revolution of 1848, the Catholic Party called for an end to the university's monopoly over education. The Falloux Law of March 15, 1850, abolished the system, and by 1852, under Minister Hippolyte Fortoul, the title of grand master was no longer used.
