= René François Rohrbacher =

Réné François Rohrbacher (27 September 1789, Langatte – 17 January 1856, Paris) was an ecclesiastical historian. He studied for several months at Sarrebourg and Phalsbourg (Pfalzburg) and at the age of seventeen had completed his Classical studies. He taught for three years at the college of Phalsbourg; entered in 1810 the ecclesiastical seminary at Nancy; and was ordained priest in 1812. Appointed assistant priest at Insming, he was transferred after six months to Lunéville. A mission which he preached in 1821 at Flavigny led to the organization of a diocesan mission band. Several years later he became a member of the Congregation of St. Peter founded by Félicité and Jean-Marie de Lamennais, and from 1827 to 1835 directed the philosophical and theological studies of young ecclesiastics who wished to become the assistants of the two brothers in their religious undertakings. When Felicite de La Mennais refused to submit to the condemnation pronounced against him by Rome, Rohrbacher separated from him and became professor of Church history at the ecclesiastical seminary of Nancy and was a Doctor of Theology at the Catholic University of Leuven. Later he retired to Paris where he spent the last years of his life.

His principal work is his monumental Histoire Universelle de l'Église Catholique (Nancy, 1842–49; 2nd ed., Paris, 1849–53). Several other editions were subsequently published and continuations added by Chantrel and Guillaume. Written from an apologetic point of view, the work contributed to the extirpation of Gallicanism in the Church of France. It was translated into German and partially recast by Hülskamp, Rump, and numerous other writers. (For the other works of Rohrbacher, see Hurter, Nomenclator Lit., III [Innsbruck, 1895], 1069-71.)
