= Roger Ninféi =

French priest (1916–2003)

Roger Ninféi (30 July 1916 – 28 February 2003) was a French Marianist priest from Moyeuvre-Grande. He was a builder, educator, director of several schools among the largest ones in France. He significantly developed the Collège Stanislas de Paris and launched the Collège Sainte-Marie d'Antony. In 1994, he was appointed Officer of the Légion d'honneur under the ministry of the Nationale Education. He died in Antony, Hauts-de-Seine, and is buried in the Antony cemetery.
