= Auch Cathedral =

Cathedral in Auch, France

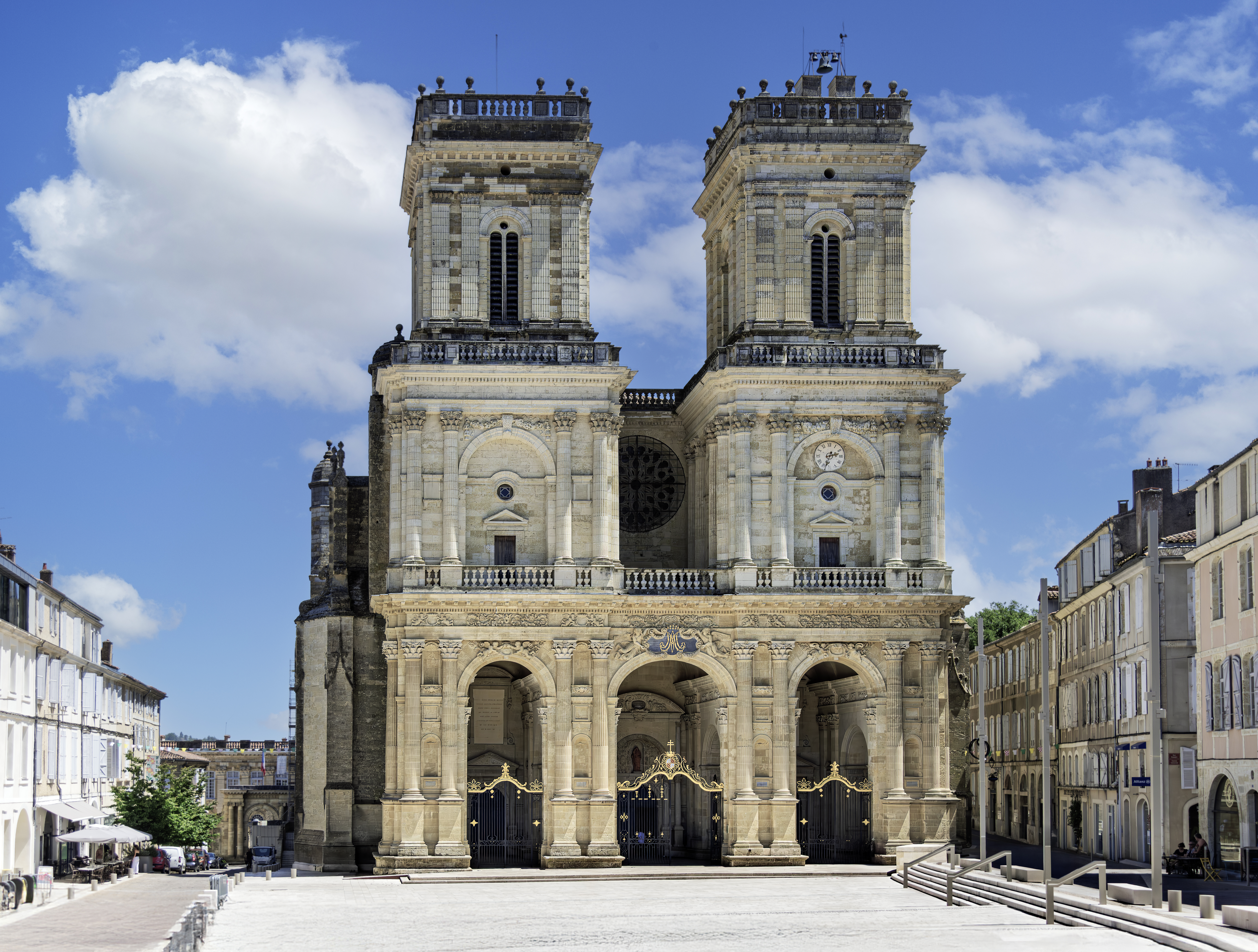
- Auch Cathedral, west front

Religion
- Affiliation: Roman Catholic Church
- Rite: Roman
- Ecclesiastical or organizational status: Cathedral
- Leadership: Bishop Bertrand Lacombe
- Year consecrated: 12 February 1548

Location
- Location: Auch, France
- Interactive map of Auch Cathedral
- Coordinates: 43°38′47″N 0°35′9″E

Architecture
- Style: Gothic, Renaissance
- Groundbreaking: 1489
- Completed: 1680 (191 years)

Auch Cathedral (French: Basilique Cathédrale Sainte-Marie d'Auch) is a Roman Catholic church located in the town of Auch in the Midi-Pyrénées, France. It is a national monument, and is the seat of the Archbishopric of Auch. Under the Concordat of 1801, the ecclesiastical office was dissolved and annexed to the Diocese of Agen, but re-established in 1822. It was granted the status of a basilica minor on 25 April 1928. The cathedral contains a suite of 18 Renaissance stained glass windows by Arnaud de Moles.

== Gallery ==
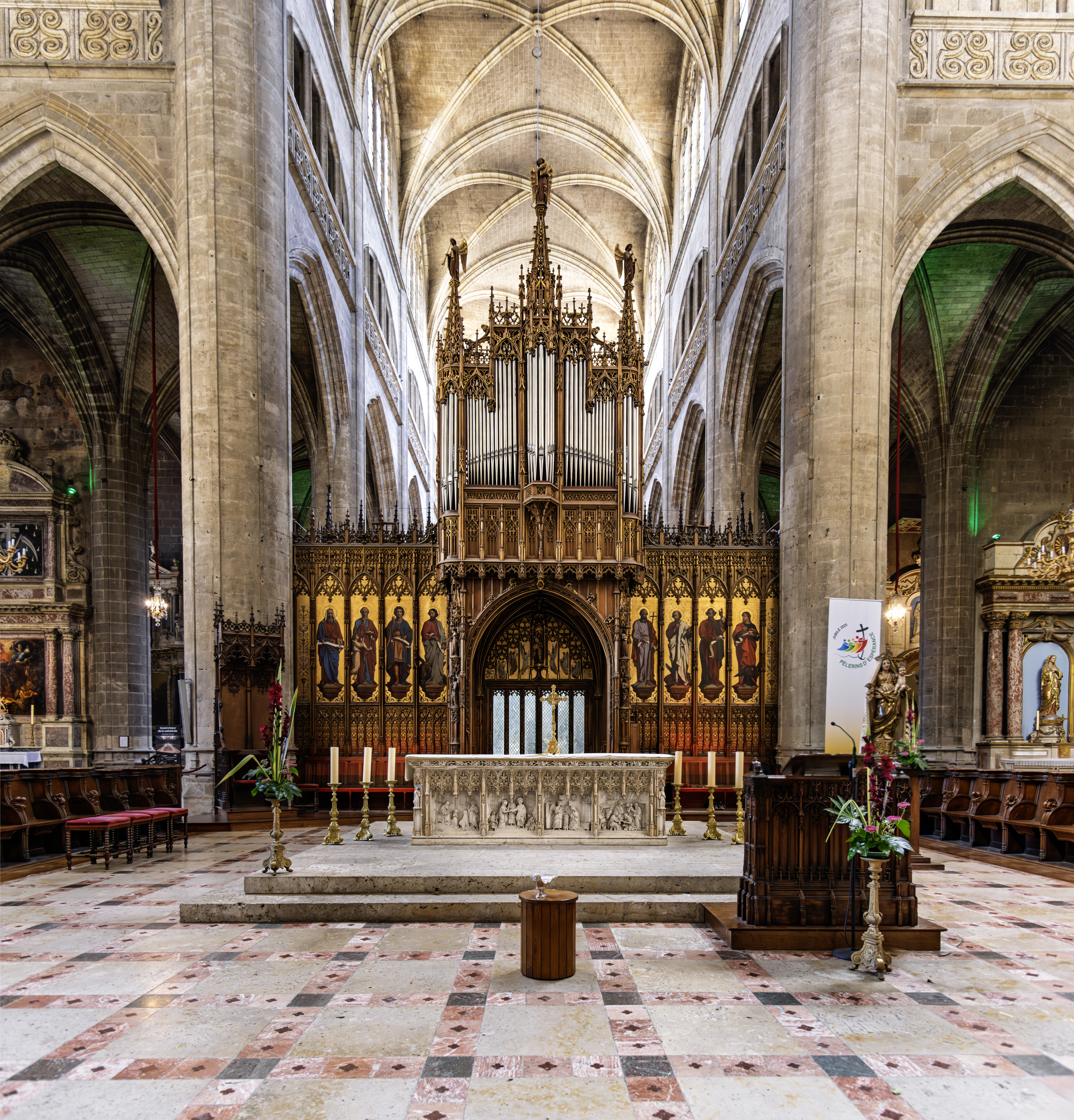
Central nave with the pre-choir and choir organ

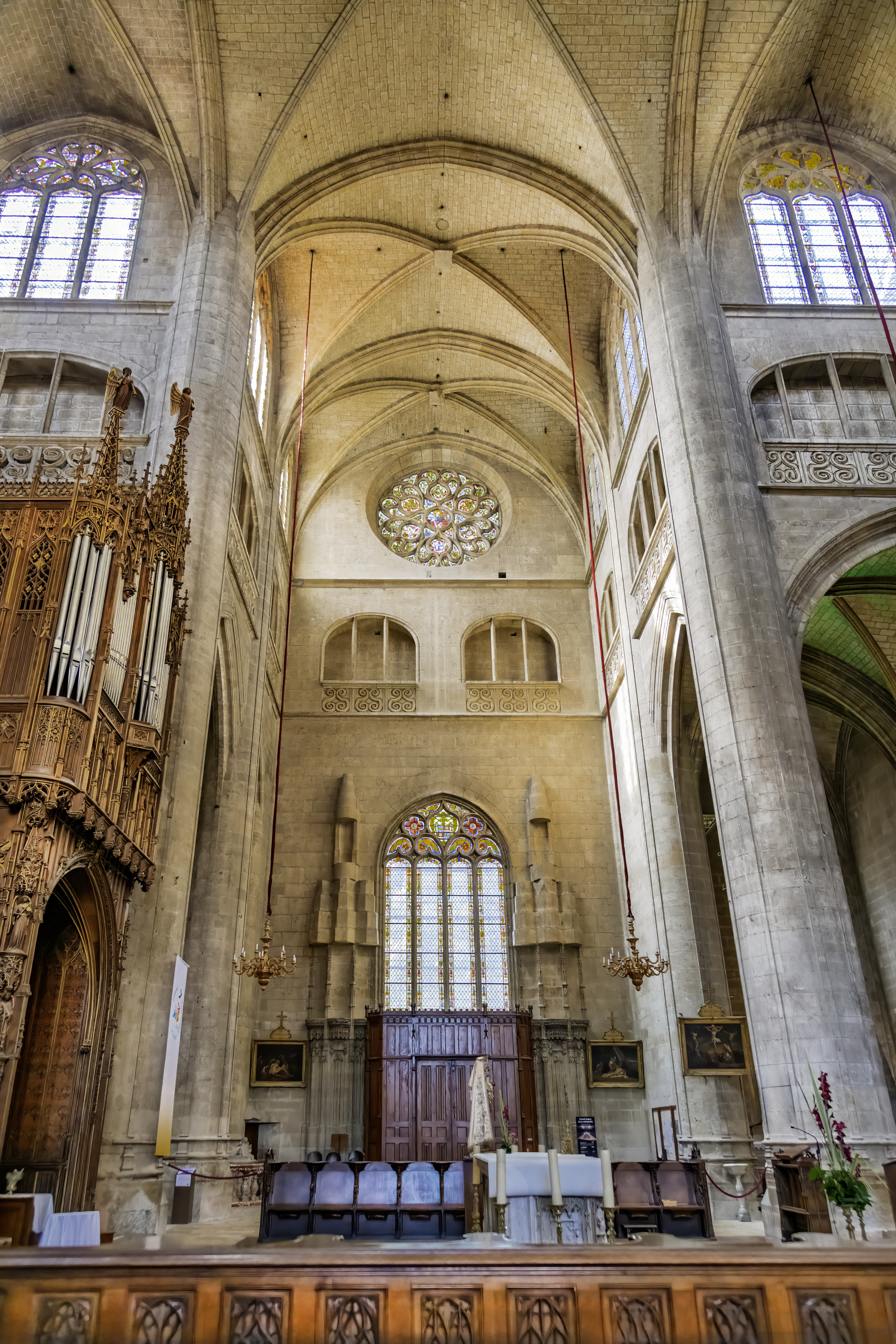
Interior view of the right transept

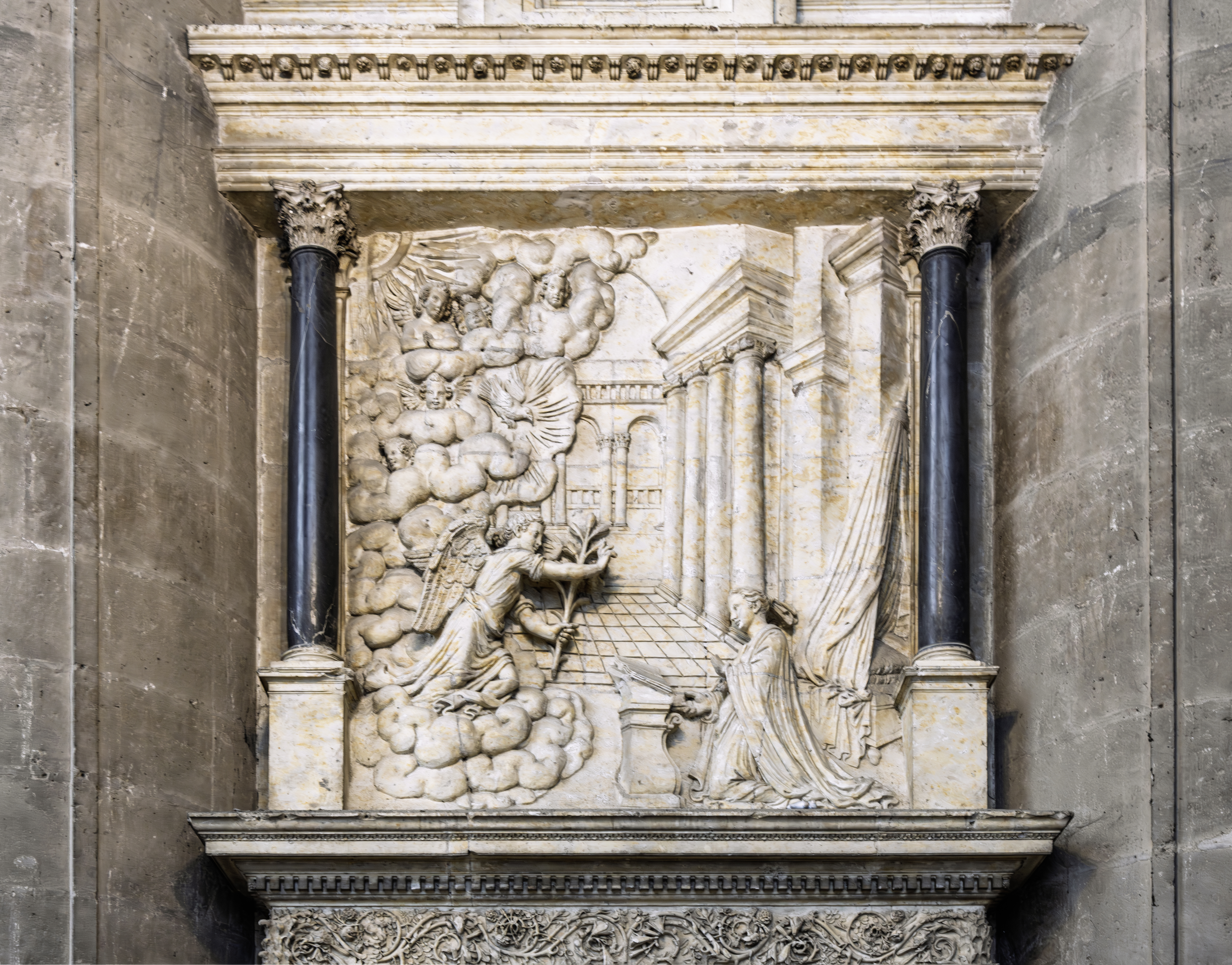
"The Annunciation", a bas-relief of the ambulatory

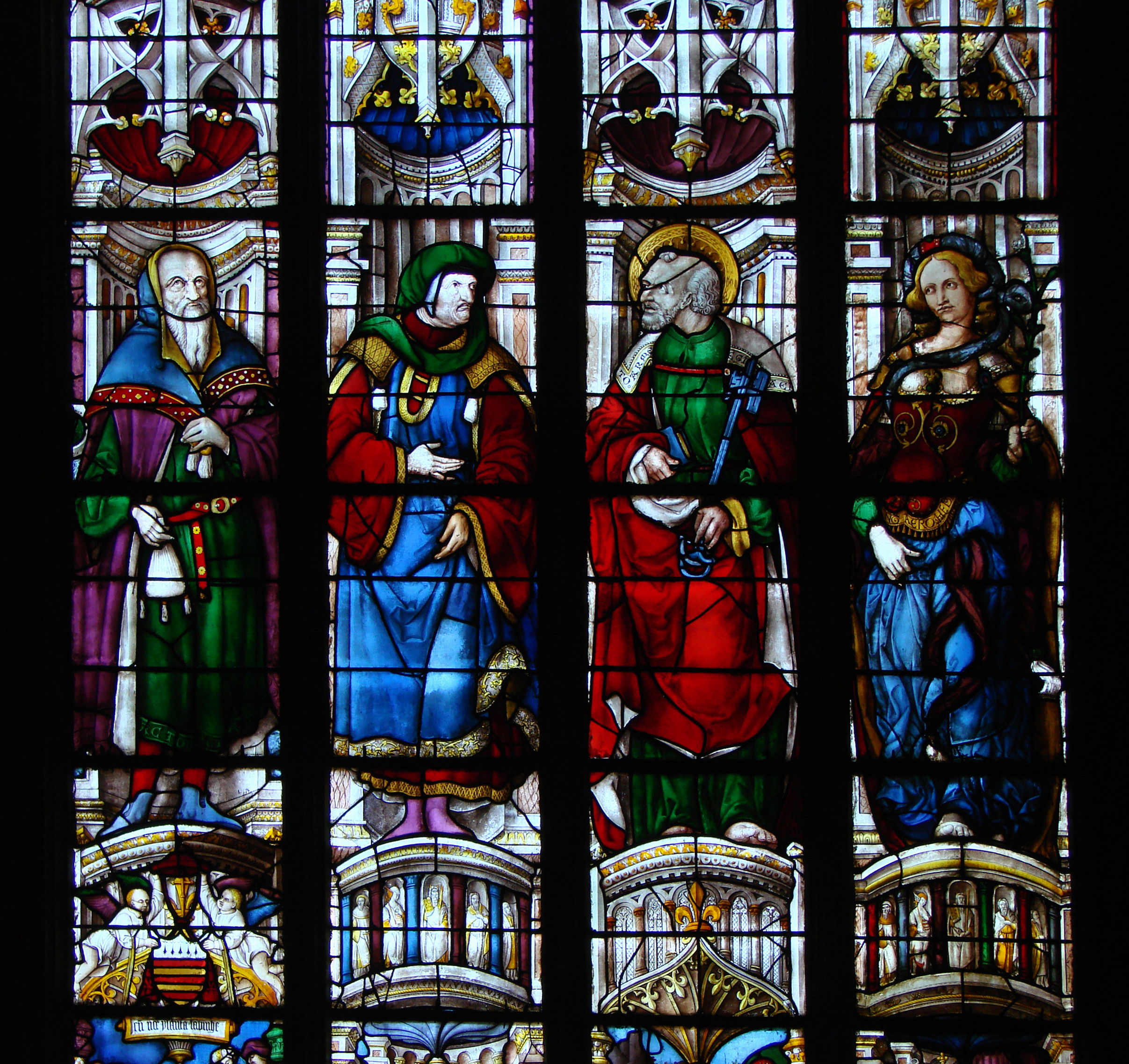
Stained glass window by Arnaud de Moles

Plan of the cathedral
