= Society of St Peter (Congrégation de Saint-Pierre) =

- Society of St Peter
- Named after: Congrégation de Saint-Pierre (original name in French)
- Formation: 1828
- Founder: Jean-Marie de La Mennais Félicité de Lamennais Philippe Gerbet
- Dissolved: 1834

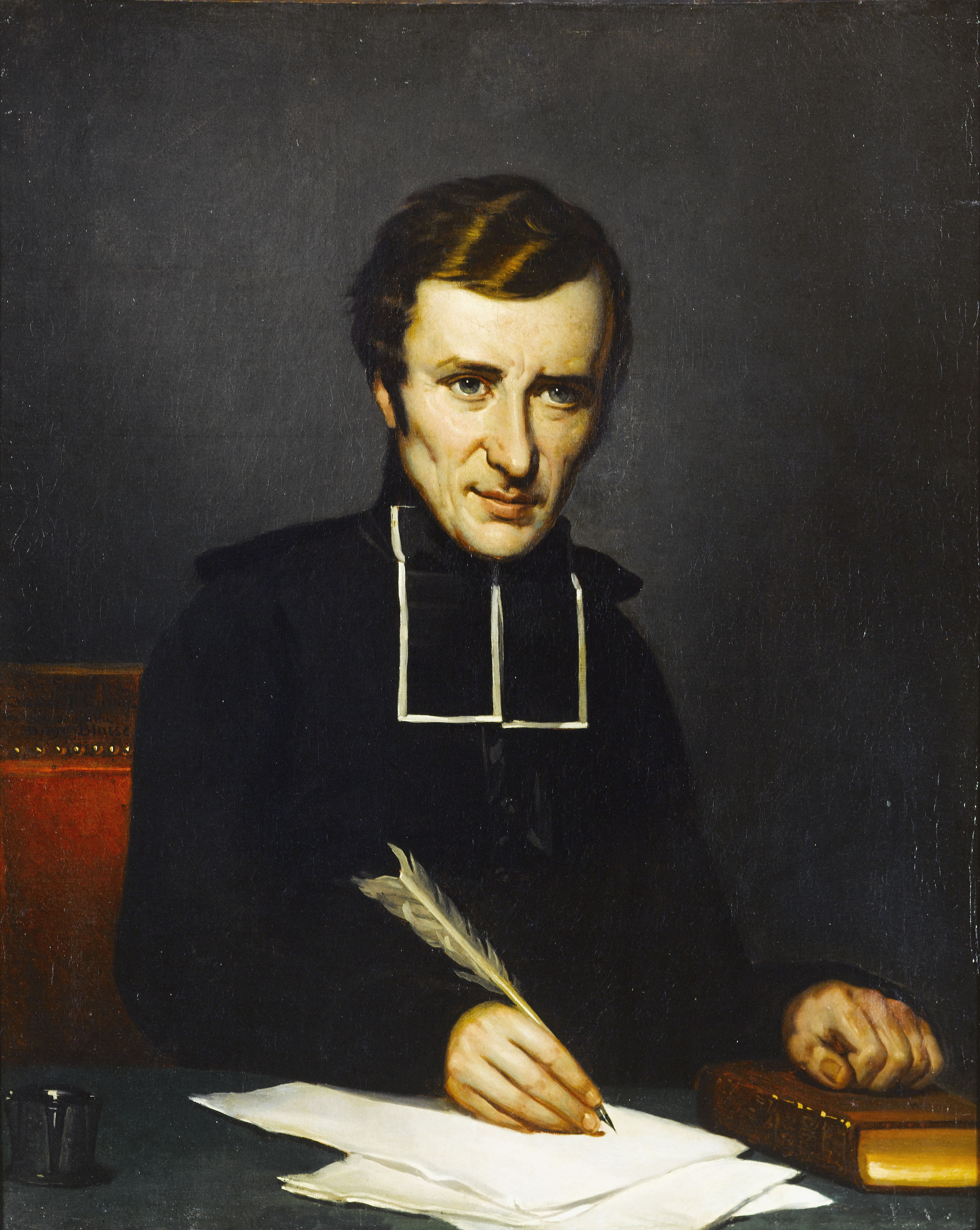
Félicité Lamennais

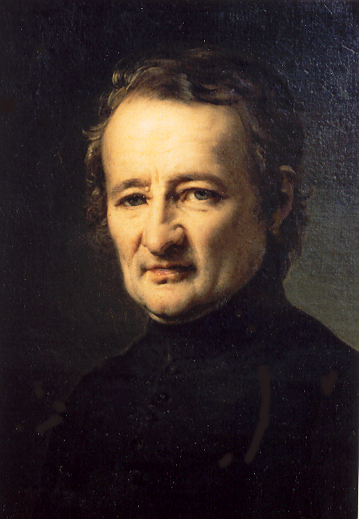
Jean-Marie de la Mennais

== A congregation of priests first based in Saint-Méen ==
The Society of St. Peter (Congrégation de Saint-Pierre), was originally called as Mission Priests of Saint-Méen, linked with the Missionaries of Rennes, were a missionary religious institute of Roman Catholic priests. The priests of the congregation are usually called Missionaries of Rennes. Founded at St-Méen in the Diocese of Rennes, by Jean-Marie de La Mennais, for the care of the diocesan seminary and the holding of missions. The disciples of the founder's younger brother, Félicité, in 1829 withdrew with him into the solitude of La Chênaie, forming the famous Society of St. Peter, with which the elder community at its own request was united, under the superiorship of Félicité.

== An extension to the society of St. Peter ==
The new congregation was placed under simple vows, the aims proposed being the defence of the Faith, the education of youth, and the giving of missions. A house of studies was erected at Malestroit, near Ploërmel, and placed under the direction of Fathers Blanc and Rohrbacher, while Lamennais remained at La Chênaie, with the younger members, writing for them his "Guide de la jeunesse", and for others more advanced the "Journée du chrétien". Lamennais's long-cherished project to form a body of priests thoroughly equipped for pressing needs in the Church of France, a scheme which he outlined in 1825 in a letter to M. de Salinis, seemed well on the way towards fulfilment. A vivid picture of the rule of life and the spirit of La Chênaie is to be found in the letters of Maurice de Guérin, whose companions were such men as Olympe-Philippe Gerbet, Guéranger, Jean-Joseph Gaume, Scorbiac and Ch. de Sainte-Foi.

== Opposition by the pope ==
The condemnation of L'Avenir disturbed only temporarily the activity at La Chénaie. On the final defection of Félicité, however, the Bishop of Rennes transferred to Jean-Marie the superiorship of the congregation, the members of which left La Chênaie for Malestroit, laymen being now excluded. The congregation, reorganized, gained a new lease of life in 1837 and by 1861 had 200 members in 9 houses, under the mother-house at Rennes.

== End of the institute ==
The institute ceased to exist after the encyclic Singulari Nos and with the dissociation of religious orders in France.

== Posterity ==
The existence of the Congregation of Saint-Pierre was brief, barely 6 years, but it was marked by a large number of experiments of all kinds: seminary, direction of college of Juilly, missions, writings. Religious and sympathizers conducted a study of theological, philosophical, historical, linguistic sciences in order to better understand the demands of the world, reflect on the social role of the Church, improve the training of clergy. This intellectual work had, indirectly, repercussions.

The compulsory study of several living languages may explain why some of the members have become specialists in Oriental languages (Arabic, Sanskrit, Persian, even Chinese). Some have developed a vocation as a bishop. In addition, many of the religious elders of the institute have demonstrated lifelong dedication to the service of the faith.

The quality of philosophical and theological education has been recognized by many of the religious who received their training there and whose testimonies have come down to us through their correspondence. Sympathy and opposition aroused by the exchange of ideas enriched the debates relating to the place of the Church. Mennaisian studies can shed light on the theological and ecclesiastical history of the 19th century.
