= Brothers of Christian Instruction =

Roman Catholic religious congregation for men

- Formation: 1819; 207 years ago
- Founder: Gabriel Deshayes and Jean-Marie de Lamennais
- Type: Lay Religious Congregation of Pontifical Right (for Men)
- Purpose: Educational/Religious
- Headquarters: Via della Divina Provvidenza 44, 00166 Roma, Italy
- Location: Various
- Region served: Worldwide
- Members: 773 members (3 priests) (2017)
- Superior General: Br. Hervé Zamor, F.I.C.P.
- Website: http://www.lamennais.org

Older logo of the Brothers of Christian Instruction.

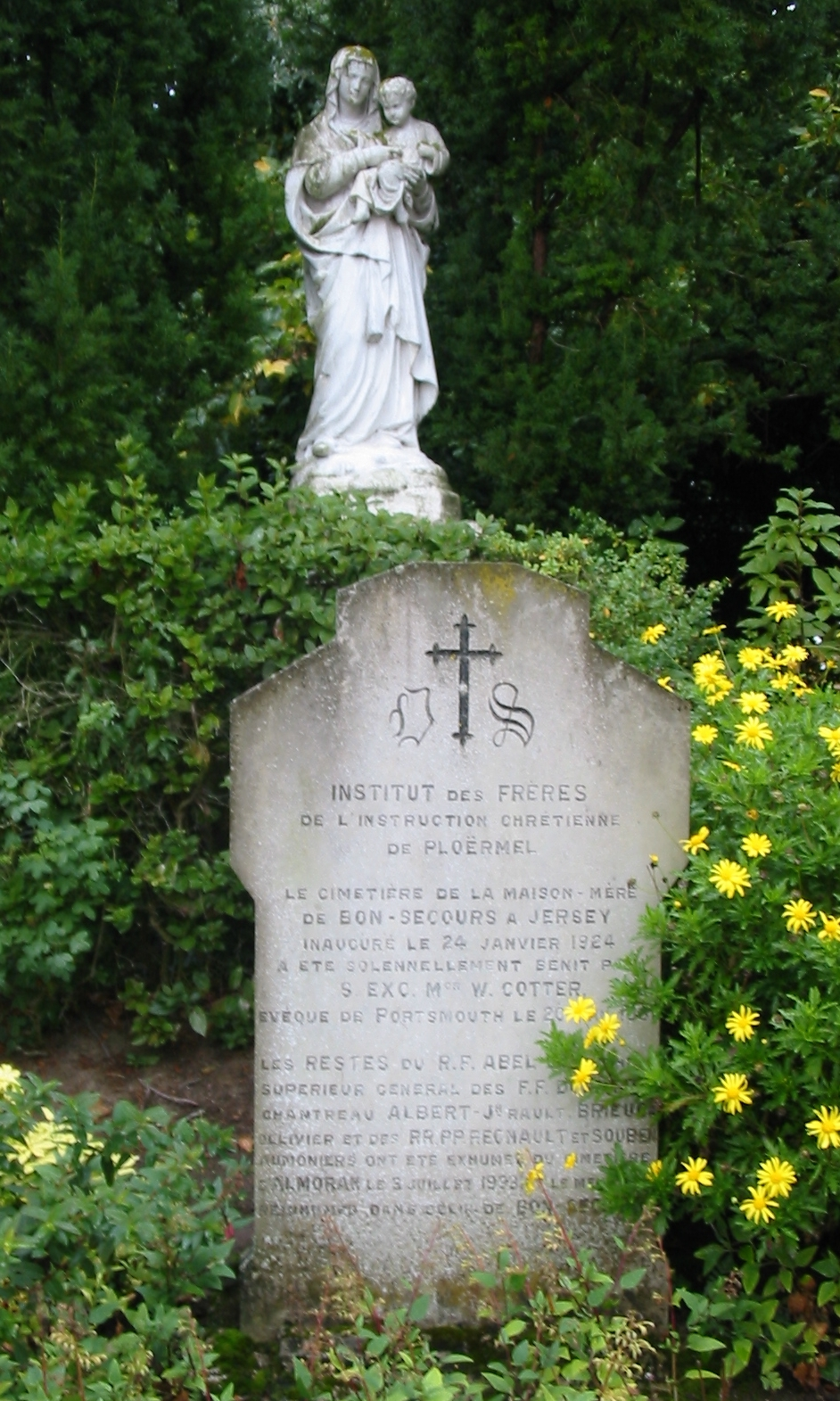
Former college of the Brothers of Christian Instruction in Jersey

The Brothers of Christian Instruction (Latin: Institutum Fratrum Instructionis Christianae de Ploërmel, F.I.C.P.), commonly known as the La Mennais Brothers, is a Catholic lay religious order founded in 1819 by Gabriel Deshayes and Jean-Marie de la Mennais for the instruction of youth. Their aim remains that of their Founder: "to educate the young and to make Jesus Christ better known and better loved".

The brothers are bound by the simple vows of poverty, chastity, and obedience.

== History ==
On June 16, 1819, Gabriel Deshayes, pastor at Auray and vicar general of Vannes, and Jean-Marie de Lamennais, vicar of Saint-Brieuc, two Catholic priests in France, established the Daughters of Providence and the Brothers of Christian Instruction.

The first brothers took their novitiates with the Christian Brothers, whose rule was to a large extent adopted. The organization dedicated itself to promoting education among the working class in France and, eventually, across the world. The motherhouse was established at Ploërmel in November 1824. In 1876, the Brothers of Gascony, founded by Bishop de la Croix d’Azolette, then Archbishop of Auch, and in 1880, the Brothers of Sainte-Marie de Tinchebray, founded by Father Charles-Augustin Duguey, subsumed themselves within the Brothers of Ploërmel.

The Brothers received canonical approval by Pope Leo XIII on March 13, 1891.

From the motherhouse at Ploërmel, the brothers founded sites in England, Africa, Asia, North America, and Oceania. In 1886 the first brothers arrived in Montreal and were shortly afterwards introduced into the United States. To escape the effects of a 1901 French law curtailing certain kinds of religious schooling, the motherhouse was transferred to Taunton, England. In 1903, following through on the strict secularism of the 1901 law, the French government dissolved the brotherhood's French presence and confiscated its properties. At the same time, they established a presence in Bulgaria, Turkey, and Egypt.

The Brothers of Christian Instruction grew, extending their mission to the Philippines and Spain, and expanding it in the United Kingdom. In 2015, 1,300 members of the Brothers of Christian Instruction were spread across 25 countries.

== Institutions ==
- Collège Jean de la Mennais
- St. Francis Xavier's College (Liverpool)
- St. John Fisher Ibanda Secondary School
- St Mary's Independent School, Southampton
- St. Mary's International School
- Walsh University
- Institution Saint-Louis de Gonzague in Delmas, Haiti
- St. Charles Lwanga Secondary School, Kasasa in Masaka, Uganda
- St. Henry's College Kitovu in Masaka, Uganda
- St. Mary's College, Kisubi in Wakiso, Uganda
- St. Mary's Duluti Secondary School, Arusha
- Seiko Gakuin Junior and Senior High School
- University of Kisubi

== See also ==
- Pell Wall Hall
- Cheswardine
- Consecrated life
