= Ambroise Rendu (politician) =

French politician (1874–1973)

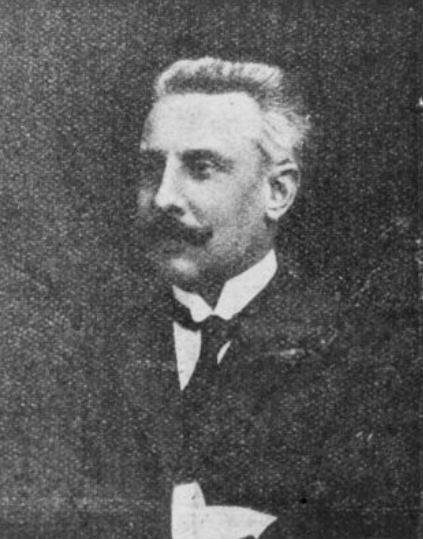
Ambroise Rendu (1874–1973)

Ambroise Rendu (29 December 1874 in Paris – 3 July 1973) was a French politician. He served as a member of the Chamber of Deputies from 1919 to 1924.

There is an avenue in Paris with his name, however this is named after Ambroise Rendu, the French writer born in 1778.

== Biography ==
Great - grandson of Ambroise Rendu, son of Ambroise Rendu, lawyer at the Paris Court of Appeal, Paris city councillor and general councillor of the Seine, he became an agricultural engineer and settled as a farmer in Haute -Garonne, in Plaisance-du-Touch, on properties coming from the family of her mother, born Martha of Madron. Veteran, he is a member of the Haute-Garonne from 1919 to 1924, sitting on the right, in the group of independents. Defeated in 1924, he devoted himself to agricultural syndicalism - he will long be vice-president of the French Farmers' Society - and to the Purpan Graduate School of Agriculture, which he helped to create. In 1929, he was elected maintainer of the Academy of Floral Games (4 th chair), where he succeeded the Marquis de Suffren. In 1933, he failed to be elected municipal councillor of the St. Thomas Aquinas area, in Paris, during the by-election caused by the resignation of his father, who hoped to hand over his seat, eventually won by Édouard Frédéric- Dupont, then at the very beginning of his political career. Ambroise Rendu is the grandfather of journalist Marc Ambroise-Rendu .
