= Maurice Lucien Fréchard =

French Roman Catholic prelate (1928–2023)

His Excellency Maurice Fréchard
- Archbishop Emeritus of Auch
- Installed: 6 September 1996
- Term ended: 21 December 2004
- Predecessor: Gabriel Vanel
- Successor: Maurice Gardès

Orders
- Ordination: 3 July 1955 by Luigi Traglia
- Consecration: 27 October 1996 by Émile Marcus

Personal details
- Born: 3 July 1928 Nancy, France
- Died: 27 August 2023 (aged 95) Chevilly-Larue, France
- Education: Pontifical Gregorian University; Institut Catholique de Paris

Maurice Lucien Fréchard (3 July 1928 – 27 August 2023) was a French Roman Catholic prelate. He served as Archbishop of Auch from 1996 to 2004.

== Biography ==
Born in Nancy on 3 July 1928, Fréchard joined the Congregation of the Holy Spirit and studied in Rome at the Pontifical Gregorian University, graduating in 1956. He completed his education at the Institut Catholique de Paris from 1964 to 1966.

Fréchard was ordained a priest on 3 July 1955 by the Congregation of the Holy Spirit. He served as a professor at a seminary in La Croix-Valmer from 1956 to 1963, and subsequently Chevilly-Larue until 1969. He was rector of the Pontifical French Seminary from 1982 to 1994 and subsequently spiritual director of the Saint-Augustin du séminaire de Paris from 1994 to 1995.

Fréchard was named Archbishop of Auch on 6 September 1996, succeeding Gabriel Vanel. He was consecrated on 27 October 1996 by Émile Marcus. He retired on 21 December 2004 and was succeeded by Maurice Gardès. Until August 2007, he served as Archbishop-Rector of the Sacré-Cœur, Paris. He then lived in the retirement home Séminaire des Missions de Chevilly-Larue. In 2007, he presided over the funeral of Lucien Deiss.

Maurice Lucien Fréchard died in Chevilly-Larue, Val-de-Marne on 27 August 2023, at the age of 95.

Catholic Church titles
Preceded by Gabriel Vanel	Archbishop of Auch; 1996–2004	Succeeded by Émile Marcus
