= Olympe-Philippe Gerbet =

French Catholic bishop and writer

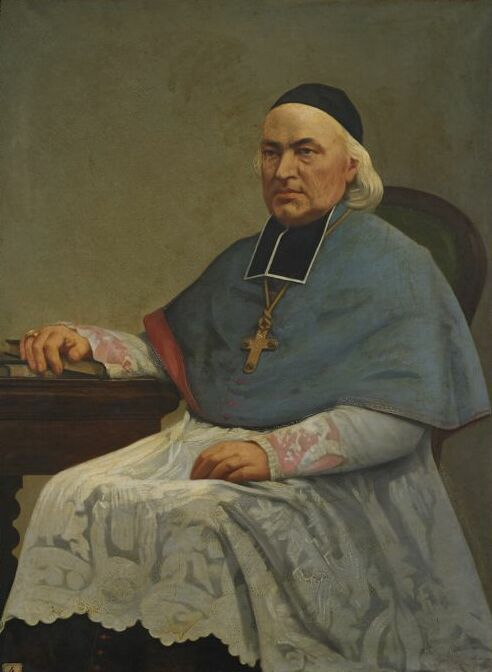
Portrait of Monseigneur Gerbet.

Olympe-Philippe Gerbet (5 February 1798 – 7 August 1864) was a French writer and Catholic bishop.

== Biography ==
=== Writer of philosophical essays ===
Gerbet was born at Poligny, Jura. He studied at the Académie and the Grand-Séminaire of Besançon, also at St-Sulpice and the Sorbonne. Ordained priest in 1822, he joined Félicité de La Mennais at "La Chesnaie" in 1825 to launch the Society of St Peter (Congrégation de Saint-Pierre), after a few years spent with Antoine de Salinis at the Lycée Henri IV. An admirer of Lamennais, he nevertheless accepted the papal encyclicals Mirari vos, of 15 August 1832, and Singulari nos, of 13 July 1834, which condemned the views of Lamennais. After fruitless efforts to convert Lamennais, who he considered his spiritual master, he withdrew to the Collège de Juilly (1836).

The years 1839-49 he spent in Rome, gathering data for his Esquisse de Rome Chrétienne. Recalled by Monseigneur Sibour, he became professor of sacred eloquence at the Sorbonne.

=== Ecclesiastical functions ===
In April 1854, under the Second French Empire, he was elected Bishop of Perpignan and was consecrated on June 29 in Amiens Cathedral, where he was previously vicar-General. His episcopate was marked by the holding of a synod (1865), the reorganization of clerical studies, various religious foundations, and by the pastoral instruction of 1860 sur diverses erreurs du temps présent, which served as a model for the Syllabus of Pope Pius IX.

=== Death ===
He died at Perpignan, Pyrénées Orientales, aged 66.

== Works ==
Besides many articles in Le Mémorial catholique, L'Avenir, L'Université catholique, and some philosophical writings such as Des doctrines philosophiques sur la certitude [Philosophical doctrines on truth] Gerbet helped to develop Lamennais' thinking in 1831 in a work entitled A Look at the Christian Controversy from the First Centuries to the Present Day, where he theorizes Catholic science taking into account future and past.

He also contributed to a Précis d'histoire de la philosophie [Summary of the history of philosophy]. All more or less tinctured with the thought of Lamennais, he wrote the following: Considérations sur le dogme générateur de la piété chrétienne [Considerations on the dogma that generates Christian piety] (Paris, 1829); Vues sur la Pénitence (Paris, 1836) — these two works are often published together; Esquisse de Rome Chrétienne (Paris, 1843), previously mentioned.

In the two former books, Gerbet views the dogmas of the Eucharist and Penance as admirably fitted to develop the affections — nourrir le coeur de sentiments — just as he uses the réalités visibles of Rome as symbols of her essence spirituelle. Sainte-Beuve (Causeries de lundi, VI, 316) says that certain passages of Gerbet's writings "are among the most beautiful and suave pages that ever honoured religious literature". Gerbet's Mandements et instructions pastorales were published at Paris in 1876.

== Sources ==
- Herbermann, Charles, ed. (1913). "Olympe-Philippe Gerbet" . Catholic Encyclopedia. New York: Robert Appleton Company.
