= Archdiocese of Auch =

Latin Catholic ecclesiastical territory in France

Coordinates: 43°38′55″N 0°34′52″E

Archdiocese of Auch-Condom-Lectoure-Lombez Archidioecesis Auxitana-Condomiensis-Lectoriensis-Lomberiensis Archidiocèse d'Auch-Condom-Lectoure-Lombez

Catholic
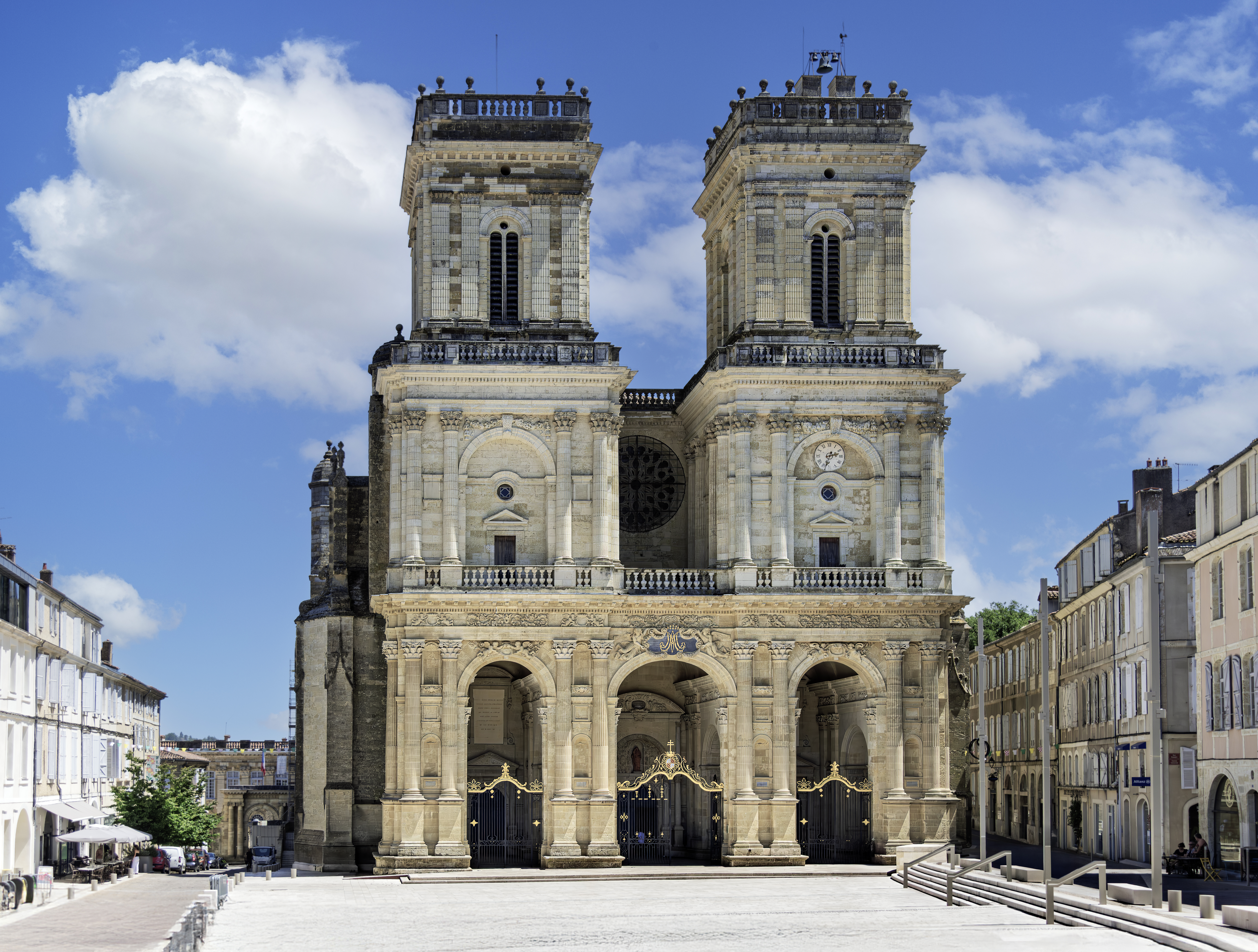
- Auch Cathedral

Location
- Country: France
- Ecclesiastical province: Toulouse
- Metropolitan: Archdiocese of Toulouse

Statistics
- Area: 6,171 km^{2} (2,383 sq mi)
- Population: Total; Catholics: (as of 2022); 191,377 ▼; 160,010 ▼ (83.6%)
- Parishes: 26

Information
- Denomination: Catholic Church
- Sui iuris church: Latin Church
- Rite: Roman Rite
- Established: 5th Century (Diocese); 9th century (Archdiocese); 29 June 1908 (Archdiocese of Auch-Condom-Lectoure-Lombez)
- Cathedral: Cathedral Basilica of Saint Mary in Auch
- Patron saint: Nativity of Our Lady
- Secular priests: 40 (Diocesan) ▼6 (Religious Orders) ▲10 Permanent Deacons ▲

Current leadership
- Pope: Leo XIV
- Archbishop: Bertrand Lacombe
- Metropolitan Archbishop: Guy de Kerimel
- Bishops emeritus: Maurice Marcel Gardès Archbishop Emeritus (2004-2020)

Map
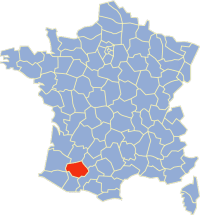

Website
- Website of the Archdiocese

The Archdiocese of Auch-Condom-Lectoure-Lombez (Latin: Archidioecesis Auxitana-Condomiensis-Lectoriensis-Lomberiensis; French: Archidiocèse d'Auch-Condom-Lectoure-Lombez), more commonly known as the Archdiocese of Auch, is a Latin Church ecclesiastical territory or archdiocese of the Catholic Church in France. The archdiocese now comprises the department of Gers in south-west France. The archdiocese is a suffragan of the Archdiocese of Toulouse, and the current bishop is Bertrand Lacombe, appointed in 2020. He is the 119th bishop of Auch.

In 2022, in the Archdiocese of Auch there was one priest for every 3,478 Catholics.

== History ==
Originally erected in the 5th century as the diocese of Auch, the first bishop of Auch known to history is the poet Orientius (first half of the fifth century), in honor of whom a famous abbey was founded in the seventh century. A local legend of the 13th century attributes to King Clovis (c. 466–511) the promotion of Auch to the status of an archbishopric, and also its status as primate of "Gascony".

The archdiocese of Auch in 1789.

Up to 1789 the archbishops of Auch bore the title of Aquitaine, though for centuries there had been no Aquitaine. The archbishop enjoyed the primacy of Novempopulania and both Navarres, though Navarre became part of France when Henri IV acceded to the throne (1589).

A local tradition that dates back to the beginning of the twelfth century tells us that Taurinus, fifth bishop of Eauze (Elusa), abandoned his episcopal city, which was destroyed by the Vandals, and transferred his see to Auch. Eauze, in fact, probably remained a metropolitan see till about the middle of the ninth century, at which time, owing to the invasions of the Vikings, it was reunited, to the Diocese of Auch, which had existed since the fifth century at and then became an archdiocese. The first bishop of Auch to be accorded the title archbishop in the surviving evidence is Archbishop Airardus in 879. He was the recipient, along with his three suffragan bishops Involatus of Comminges, Wainard of Couserans, and Garston of Tarbes (Bigorre), of a letter of Pope John VIII, in which the Pope complained that their parishioners were a people heavy with iniquity; that they were marrying without regard to church rules or public decency (including incest); that people were appropriating church goods for their own private use; and that priest, clerics, and laity were failing to obey their bishops.

As a metropolitan see by the 9th century, it had ten suffragan sees: Acqs (Dax) and Aire; Lectoure; Couserans; Oloron, Lescar, and Bayonne; Bazas; Comminges; and Tarbes.

=== Bishop Bernard and Pope Innocent ===
On 1 April 1198, less than three months after his election, Pope Innocent III sent a series of mandates to the archbishop of Auch. In one, the Pope complained that unworthy persons were being intruded, sometimes by secular persons, into parishes in the dioceses of the ecclesiastical Province of Auch, for which tasks they were unfit and had been rejected by their bishops; the archbishop was authorized to warn the bishops, to take an appeal, and, if they do not obey, to issue canonical censures and remove the offending clergy from their churches. Another mandate complained that reports had reached the Pope that, in the Province of Auch, monks, canons and other religious had left their cloisters and were visiting the courts of local magnates in neglect of their vows and monastic discipline, and their superiors; the archbishop was ordered to give them a warning and then, if they disobeyed, to suspend them from their offices and benefices. In a third mandate, the Pope advised the archbishop that in his Province there were clergy who were accumulating dignities and other benefices, including archdeaconries and cathedral dignities; the archbishop was granted special powers to advise the persons affected of their transgression, and invite them to choose one of the benefices and surrender the rest, and, if they do not cooperate, to apply ecclesiastical censures. Finally, in yet another letter, Innocent III reminds the archbishop of Auch that he was well advised by him and by his fellow bishops that Gascony was overrun by heretics, and he encourages and authorizes the archbishop to pursue them until they are cleared from his Province, by whatever effective measures he can muster, and suspending the right of appeal; and if necessary he may use the civil authorities (principes) and the people, and to coerce the heretics by the use of the material sword (si necesse fuerit, per principes et populum eosdem facias virtute materialis gladii coerceri).

Evidently unsatisfied with Archbishop Bernard's performance as archbishop, Pope Innocent sent him a letter on 15 April 1212, remarking that when a bishop feels himself to be unequal to the task of governing his diocese, he should ask himself whether he ought to put down his burden. He then pointed out that the diocese of Auch had fallen on bad times during Bernard's administration, or rather maladministration, and that it might be appropriate for him to consider a spontaneous resignation. In May 1213, the Pope commissioned the archbishop of Bordeaux, the bishop of Agen, and the abbot of Clariacensis (Agen), to investigate the many complaints about Archbishop Bernard which had come to the Pope's notice, and which had led to serious lapses in the temporal and spiritual administration of his diocese; there were also serious questions of his personal conduct. He was even said to be a harborer and favorer of heretics. The procurator which he had sent to the papal court had not settled the Pope's concerns, and the archbishop was suspended. The commission was authorized to determine the truth of the charges, and if appropriate to depose the archbishop and select some other suitable person to succeed him.

On 4 April 1218 Pope Honorius III confirmed the decision of Pope Paschal II (1099–1118) that the archbishop of Bourges enjoyed the primacy over the archbishop of Auch.

=== Cathedral and chapter ===
The current cathedral of the diocese of Auch, dedicated to the Blessed Virgin Mary, is a Gothic structure with a neo-classical Renaissance façade. Georges Goyau describes the building as "imposing in spite of this incongruity", and praises its fifteenth-century windows as the most beautiful in France. An imaginative and entirely unverified story of the earlier cathedrals, one founded by Clovis himself, is given by Abbé François Caneto.

The chapter of the cathedral was the largest in France. It was composed of fifteen dignities (not dignitaries), twenty ecclesiastical canons, and five secular canons. The dignities included: the provost, the abbot of Faget, the abbot of Idrac, the abbot of Sere; the eight archdeacons (Angles, Sabanes, Sos, Vic, Armagnac, Magnoac, Astarac, and Pardaillan); the prior of Montequivo, and the prior of Beata Maria de Nivibus, the sacristan, and the canon theologicus. All the dignities were appointees of the archbishop, except the prior de Niviis. The five secular canons were: the Count of Armagnac, the Baron de Montaut, the Baron de Pardillan, the Baron de Montesquiou, and the Baron de l'Isle. There were also 36 semiprebendarii and 38 chaplains, in addition to other clergy.

In 1436 the first archbishop, Philippe de Levis, received a bull from Pope Eugene IV which forbade the installation of anyone as a canon of the cathedral chapter of Auch who was not noble by blood or by education; or to appoint anyone to a dignity in the chapter who was not already a canon.

There were also eight collegiate churches, with chapters of canons. These included: Baranum (dean and 12 canons), Castrum novum [Castelnau de Magnoac] (10 canons, 2 prebendiaries), Jégun (8 canons), Nogaroli (12 canons, 5 prebendaries, and other members), Tria (6 canons), Vic-Fézenac (12 canons and 6 prebendiaries), Bassous (10 canons), and Sauciate [Sos] (6 canons, 4 prebendaries).

=== Seminary ===
The Council of Trent, in its 23rd session, on 15 July 1563, published a decree requiring all dioceses to have and maintain a seminary for youth studying for the priesthood. Cardinal Luigi d'Este (died 1586) did not carry out the decree, due to non-residence, but he allocated funds in his last will and testament, which his sister, Antoinette d' Este, the Duchesse de Nemours, was to use for the founding of a seminary in Auch. She failed to do so, and it was her heir, Henri de Savoie, Duc de Nemours, who finally made the funds available in 1603. It was the next archbishop, Léonard de Trapes, who began to acquire property for building a seminary in 1609. The thirty-five year reign of his successor, Dominique de Vic, produced few results and no seminary. It was Archbishop Henri de la Mothe-Houdancourt who finally chartered the seminary on 29 April 1667. In 1687, Archbishop La Baume de Suze invited the Jesuits to take charge of the Seminary of Auch. The building which was finally constructed is now the Maison Diocésaine of the diocese of Auch.

=== Revolution ===
In 1790 the National Constituent Assembly decided to bring the French church under the control of the State. Civil government of the provinces was to be reorganized into new units called 'départements', originally intended to be 83 or 84 in number. The dioceses of the Roman Catholic Church were to be reduced in number, to coincide as much as possible with the new departments. Since there were more than 130 bishoprics at the time of the Revolution, more than fifty dioceses needed to be suppressed and their territories consolidated. Clergy would need to take an oath of allegiance to the State and its Constitution, specified by the Civil Constitution of the Clergy, and they would become salaried officials of the State. Both bishops and priests would be elected by special 'electors' in each department. This meant schism, since bishops would no longer need to be approved (preconised) by the Papacy; the transfer of bishops, likewise, which had formerly been the exclusive prerogative of the pope in canon law, would be the privilege of the State; the election of bishops no longer lay with the Cathedral Chapters (which were all abolished), or other responsible clergy, or the Pope, but with electors who did not even have to be Catholics or Christians.

A new civil department, called "Gers", was created by the French Legislative Assembly. The old diocese of Auch was suppressed, and a new "Diocese of Gers" was created, with its center at Auch. It was assigned as a suffragan to the "Metropole du Sud". Archbishop La Tour du Pin-Montauban of Auch refused to take the oath to the Civil Constitution of the Clergy, and therefore his see was declared by the Legislative Assembly to be vacant. The electors of Gers chose in his place the dean of the faculty at Toulouse, Canon Paul-Benoit Barthe, who was also president of the Amis de la Constitution. He was consecrated a constitutional bishop in Paris on 13 March 1791 by Constitutional Bishop Jean-Pierre Saurine. The consecration was valid, but canonically irregular, schismatic, and blasphemous (as a parody of genuine Catholic sacraments). Barthe took possession of the diocese of Gers on 10 April 1791. In order to fill vacancies in parish churches where priests had refused the oath, Barthe consecrated 44 priests between December 1791 and September 1793. He was arrested on suspicion in July 1793 and sent to Paris, where he had to appear before the Committee of Public Safety, but he was acquitted and allowed to return to Auch. On 27 November, again the subject of accusations, he was arrested, forced to apostasize, and imprisoned at Mont-de-Marsan. In December 1794 he was again sent to Paris, where he was again released. He again returned to Auch, in May 1795, and regained possession of his cathedral in August. He resigned on 16 October 1801.

=== After the Restoration ===
After the signing of the Concordat of 1801 with First Consul Napoleon Bonaparte, Pope Pius VII demanded the resignation of all bishops in France, in order to leave no doubt as to who was a legitimate bishop and who was a Constitutional imposter. He then immediately abolished all of the dioceses in France, for the same reason. Then he began to restore the old Ancien Régime dioceses, or most of them, though not with the same boundaries as before the Revolution, but instead taking into account the new political structure of France with its departments instead of provinces. The diocese of Auch was not one of those revived by Pope Pius VII in his bull Qui Christi Domini of 29 November 1801. Its territory was assigned to the Archdiocese of Agen, which also received the territory of the suppressed dioceses of Condom, Lescar, Lectoure and Tarbes.

It was not until 6 October 1822 that the diocese of Auch was reestablished.

The Archdiocese of Auch, re-established as a metropolitanate in 1882, was made up of the former archdiocese of the same name and the former Dioceses of Lectoure, Condom, and Lombez. Lombez was previously a suffragan of Toulouse; thenceforth the suffragans of Auch were Aire, Tarbes, and Bayonne.

On 30 July 1904, the Chamber of Deputies of the French Republic voted to sever diplomatic relations with the Vatican On 9 December 1905, the 1905 French law on the Separation of the Churches and the State was passed by the Chamber of Deputies. One provision stated that the Republic does not recognize, pay, or subsidize any religious sect, and therefore all expenses related to the exercise of religion were removed from the budgets of the State, departments and municipalities. This meant that the clergy lost their state salaries. It also meant that all houses of worship, previously supported by state subsidy, were and remained the property of the State, unless claimed within one year by a legally registered religious association. The diocese of Auch was hard hit by these and other rules of the law. Alluding to these hardships, Pope Pius X, on 29 June 1908, consoled the archbishop and people by granting the archbishop and the diocese the right to use the titles of three suppressed dioceses in the territory of the diocese of Auch: Lectoure, Condom, and Lombez. The impetus for the grant had actually come from Archbishop Ricard himself.

In World War I, 218 clergy from the diocese of Auch were mobilized into the French army. Fifteen died, three were awarded the Legion of Honour, one won the Médaille militaire, 40 won the Croix de guerre, and 40 won the Medaille d'honneur.

As of 2023, the number of priests incardinated (given official credentials in the diocese) was reduced to 40 priests and 6 members of religious orders.

== Bishops and Archbishops ==
=== ca. 400 to 1200 ===
...

- Orientius (c. 439)
- Nicetius (c. 506 – 511)
- Proculeianus (c. 533 – 551)
- Faustus (c. 585)
- Saius (c. 585)
- Dracoaldus (before 616)
- Audericus (c. 627)
- Leutadas (c. 673 – 675)

? Leotadus (770–796)

- Izimbardus (before 836)
- Airardus (c. 879)
- Odilus
- Bernardus
- Hidulfus
- Seguinus
- Adulfus
- Garsias (c. 980)
- Odo (c. 988 – c. 1020)
- Garsias de la Barthe (c. 1030 – )
- Raimundus de Copa
- Austendus (1050/1055 – 1068)
- Guillaume de Montaut (1068 – 17 April 1096)
- Raimundus de Pardiac (1096–1118)
- Bernard de Sainte-Christine
- Guillaume Dandozile
- Gerard de la Bothe (1173 – 1192)

=== from 1200 to 1500 ===
- Bernardus (c. 1201)
- Garsias de l'Ort (l'Hort) (c. 1215 – 1226)
- Amanevus de Grisinhac (c. 1226 – 1241)
- Hispanus de Massanc (21 December 1244 – 1261 ?)
- Amanevus (1262 – 11 May 1318)

Sede Vacante (1318 – 1323)

- Guillaume de Flavacourt (26 August 1323 – 18 January 1357)
- Arnaud Aubert (18 January 1357 – 11 June 1371)
- Jean Roger (27 July 1371 – 27 August 1375)
- Philippe d'Alençon (1375 – 1379) (Administrator)
- Jean de Cardaillac (24 January 1379 – 20 May 1379) (Administrator)
- Jean Flandrin (20 May 1379 – 1390) (Avignon Obedience)
- Jean d'Armagnac (17 October 1390 – 8 October 1408) (Avignon Obedience)
- Berengarius Guilhot (10 December 1408 – 14 February 1425) (Avignon Obedience)
- Philippe de Levis (14 February 1425 – 1454)
- Philippe de Levis (29 March 1454 – 24 March 1463)
- Jean de Lascur (14 March 1463 – 28 August 1483)
- François de Savoie (20 October 1483 – 6 October 1490)
- Jean de la Tremouille (5 November 1490 – 1507)

=== from 1500 to 1800 ===
- Cardinal François Guillaume de Clermont (4 July 1507 – 1538)
- Cardinal François de Tournon (14 June 1538 – 1551)
- Cardinal Ippolito d'Este (22 April 1551 – 1563) (Administrator)
- Cardinal Luigi d'Este (8 October 1563 – 30 December 1586)

Henri de Savoie (Archbishop-elect)

- Léonard de Trapes (3 November 1597 – 29 October 1629)
- Dominique de Vic (27 January 1625 – 21 December 1660)
- Henri de la Mothe-Houdancourt (1662 – 24 February 1684)

Sede Vacante (1684–1693)

- Armand-Anne-Tristan de la Baume de Suze (1693 – 4 March 1705)
- Augustin de Maupeou (1705 – 12 June 1712)
- Jacques Desmaretz (26 February 1714 – 25 November 1725)
- Melchior de Polignac (December 1725 – 20 November 1741 died)
- Jean-François de Montillet de Grenaud (9 July 1742 – 7 February 1776)
- Claude-Marc-Antoine d'Apchon (20 May 1776 – 21 May 1783)
- Louis-Apolinaire de La Tour du Pin-Montauban (18 July 1783 – 24 October 1801)

Paul-Benoît Barthe (1791–1801) (Constitutional Bishop; schismatic)

=== After the Restoration ===
- André-Etienne-Antoine de Morlhon (13 Jan 1823 – 14 Jan 1828)
- Louis-François-Auguste de Rohan-Chabot (27 Apr 1828 – 6 Jul 1828)
- Joachim-Jean-Xavier d'Isoard (6 Jul 1828 appointed – 13 Jun 1839)
- Nicolas-Augustin de la Croix d'Azolette (4 Dec 1839 – Jan 1856)
- Louis-Antoine de Salinis (12 Feb 1856 – 30 Jan 1861)
- François-Augustin Delamare (20 Feb 1861 – 26 Jul 1871)
- Pierre-Henri Gérault de Langalerie (30 Sep 1871 – 13 Feb 1886)
- Louis-Joseph-Jean-Baptiste-Léon Gouzot (16 Apr 1887 – 20 Aug 1895)
- Matthieu-Victor-Félicien Balaïn, O.M.I. (30 May 1896 – 13 May 1905)
- Emile-Christophe Enard (21 February 1906 – 13 Mar 1907)
- Joseph-François-Ernest Ricard (15 Apr 1907 appointed – 18 Sep 1934 retired)
- Virgile-Joseph Béguin (24 Dec 1934 appointed – 2 Mar 1955 died)
- Henri Audrain (2 Mar 1955 succeeded – 16 Apr 1968 resigned)
- Maurice-Mathieu-Louis Rigaud (16 Apr 1968 appointed – 29 Dec 1984 died)
- Gabriel Vanel (21 Jun 1985 appointed – 1 Mar 1996 resigned)
- Maurice Lucien Fréchard, C.S.Sp. (6 Sep 1996 appointed – 21 Dec 2004 retired)
- Maurice Marcel Gardès (21 Dec 2004 appointed – 22 Oct 2020 retired)
- Bertrand Lacombe (22 Oct 2020 – )

== See also ==
- Catholic Church in France

== Bibliography ==
=== Reference works ===
- Gams, Pius Bonifatius (1873). Series episcoporum Ecclesiae catholicae: quotquot innotuerunt a beato Petro apostolo. Ratisbon: Typis et Sumptibus Georgii Josephi Manz. (Use with caution; obsolete)
- Eubel, Conradus, ed. (1913). Hierarchia catholica, Tomus 1 (second ed.). Münster: Libreria Regensbergiana. (in Latin)
- Eubel, Conradus, ed. (1914). Hierarchia catholica, Tomus 2 (second ed.). Münster: Libreria Regensbergiana. (in Latin)
- Gulik, Guilelmus (1923). Eubel, Conradus (ed.). Hierarchia catholica, Tomus 3 (second ed.). Münster: Libreria Regensbergiana.
- Gauchat, Patritius (Patrice) (1935). Hierarchia catholica IV (1592-1667). Münster: Libraria Regensbergiana.
- Ritzler, Remigius; Sefrin, Pirminus (1952). Hierarchia catholica medii et recentis aevi V (1667-1730). Patavii: Messagero di S. Antonio.
- Ritzler, Remigius; Sefrin, Pirminus (1958). Hierarchia catholica medii et recentis aevi VI (1730-1799). Patavii: Messagero di S. Antonio.
- Ritzler, Remigius; Sefrin, Pirminus (1968). Hierarchia Catholica medii et recentioris aevi sive summorum pontificum, S. R. E. cardinalium, ecclesiarum antistitum series... A pontificatu Pii PP. VII (1800) usque ad pontificatum Gregorii PP. XVI (1846) (in Latin). Vol. VII. Monasterii: Libr. Regensburgiana.
- Remigius Ritzler; Pirminus Sefrin (1978). Hierarchia catholica Medii et recentioris aevi... A Pontificatu PII PP. IX (1846) usque ad Pontificatum Leonis PP. XIII (1903) (in Latin). Vol. VIII. Il Messaggero di S. Antonio.
- Pięta, Zenon (2002). Hierarchia catholica medii et recentioris aevi... A pontificatu Pii PP. X (1903) usque ad pontificatum Benedictii PP. XV (1922) (in Latin). Vol. IX. Padua: Messagero di San Antonio. ISBN 978-88-250-1000-8.

=== Studies ===
- Benac, J. (1906). "Le Seminaire d'Auch," Revue de Gascogne 6 (1906), pp. 545–553; 7 (1907), pp. 67–74.
- Bourgeat, Charles (1954). L'abbaye de Bouillas; histoire d'une ancienne abbaye cistercienne de diocese d'Auch (Auch, 1954). (in French)
- Brugeles, Louis-Clément de (1746). Chroniques ecclésiastiques du diocèse d'Auch, suivies de celles des comtes du même diocèse (in French). Toulouse: J.-P. Robert.
- Caneto, François (1850). Monographe de Sainte-Marie d'Auch, histoire et description de cette cathédrale. [With plates.] (in French). Auch: L.-A. Brun.
- Caneto, F (1874). "Souvenirs relatifs au siege d'Auch," Revue de Gascogne 15 (1874), 341–361.
- Clergeac, Adrien (1912). Chronologie des archevêques, évêques et abbés de l'ancienne province ecclésiastique d'Auch, et des diocèses de Condom et de Lombez, 1300–1801. Paris: Honoré Champion. (in French)
- Duchesne, Louis (1910). Fastes épiscopaux de l'ancienne Gaule: II. L'Aquitaine et les Lyonnaises. Paris: Fontemoing. pp. 89–97.
- Du Tems, Hugues (1774). Le clergé de France, ou tableau historique et chronologique des archevêques, évêques, abbés, abbesses et chefs des chapitres principaux du royaume, depuis la fondation des églises jusqu'à nos jours (in French). Vol. Tome premier. Paris: Delalain. pp. 388–439.
- Jean, Armand (1891). Les évêques et les archevêques de France depuis 1682 jusqu'à 1801 (in French). Paris: A. Picard.
- Pisani, Paul (1907). Répertoire biographique de l'épiscopat constitutionnel (1791-1802) (in French). Paris: A. Picard et fils. pp. 385–388.
- Sainte-Marthe, Denis de (1715). Gallia Christiana, In Provincias Ecclesiasticas Distributa (in Latin). Vol. Tomus primus. Paris: Excudebat Johannes-Baptista Coignard, Regis & Academiae Gallicae Architypographus. pp. 968–1036, Instrumenta, pp. 159–172.
- Société bibliographique (France) (1907). L'épiscopat français depuis le Concordat jusqu'à la Séparation (1802-1905). Paris: Librairie des Saints-Pères.
