= Insming =

- Commune
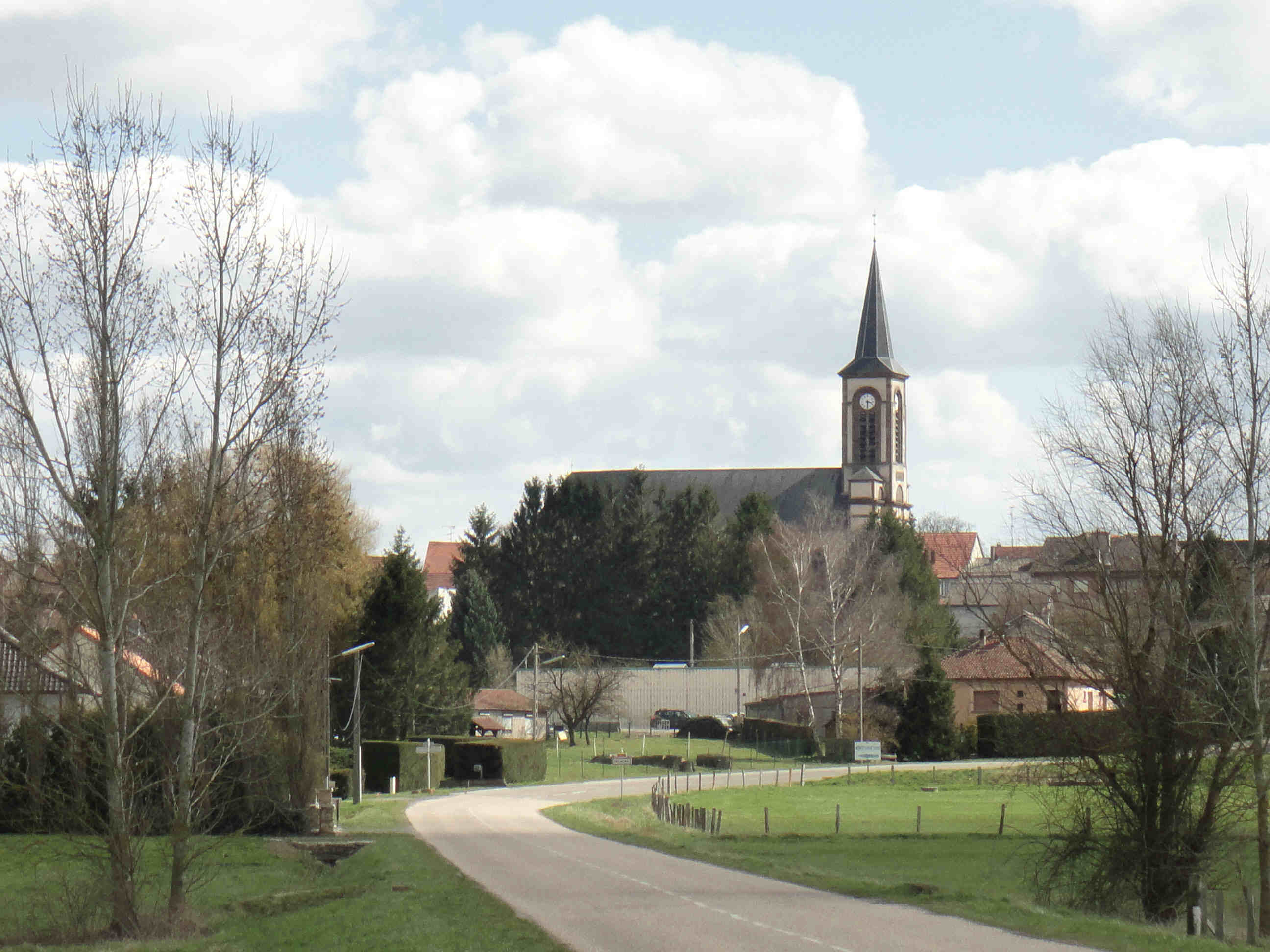
- The church in Insming

- Coat of arms
- Location of Insming
- Location within France Location within Grand Est
- Coordinates: 48°57′24″N 6°52′30″E
- Country: France
- Region: Grand Est
- Department: Moselle
- Arrondissement: Sarrebourg-Château-Salins
- Canton: Le Saulnois
- Intercommunality: CC du Saulnois

Government
  - Mayor (2020–2026): Alain Pattar
- Area^{1}: 7.21 km^{2} (2.78 sq mi)
- Elevation: 235 m (771 ft)
- Highest elevation: 273 m (896 ft)
- Lowest elevation: 215 m (705 ft)
- Population (2023): 605
  - Density: 83.9/km^{2} (217/sq mi)
- Time zone: UTC+01:00 (CET)
  - Summer (DST): UTC+02:00 (CEST)
- INSEE/Postal code: 57346 /57670
- ^{1} French Land Register data, which excludes lakes, ponds, glaciers > 1 km^{2} (0.386 sq mi or 247 acres) and river estuaries.

Insming (French pronunciation: [ɛ̃smɛ̃]; German: Insmingen) is a commune in the Moselle department in Grand Est in north-eastern France.

== Geography ==
It is situated about 60 km southeast of Metz, about 80 km northeast of Nancy, and about 100 km northwest of Strasbourg.

Its altitude is 215 meters minimum and 273 meters maximum.

It is part of the canton d'Albestroff, which is part of the "arrondissement" of Château-Salins.

== History ==
Since the eighth century, Insming has been known under different names: Asmengia (1106), Asmingiam (1152), Amanges (1296), Esminga and Einsminga (1299), Einsmingen (1456), Amangen and Enssmingen (1594). It is the oldest village of the canton of Albestroff. In the 12th century, it was the headquarters of a priesthood dependent on Saint-Mihiel Abbey, which was founded at the end of the 11th century. Insming was a small dependence of Counts de Ferrettes and de Montbeliard.

After World War II, Insming saw an economic boom, mainly thanks to Fernand Lambert, who was its mayor from 1945 to 1977. He inaugurated the first high school in the Moselle department after the war.

== Things to see ==
- The Saint-Clément church and its 18th-century organ, which is the biggest in Moselle, and possibly one of the largest in rural areas in the world.
- The seventeenth century "Calvaire."
- The cemetery "ossuaire."

== See also ==
- Communes of the Moselle department
