= Claude Liautard =

French Catholic priest

Claude Rosalie Liautard
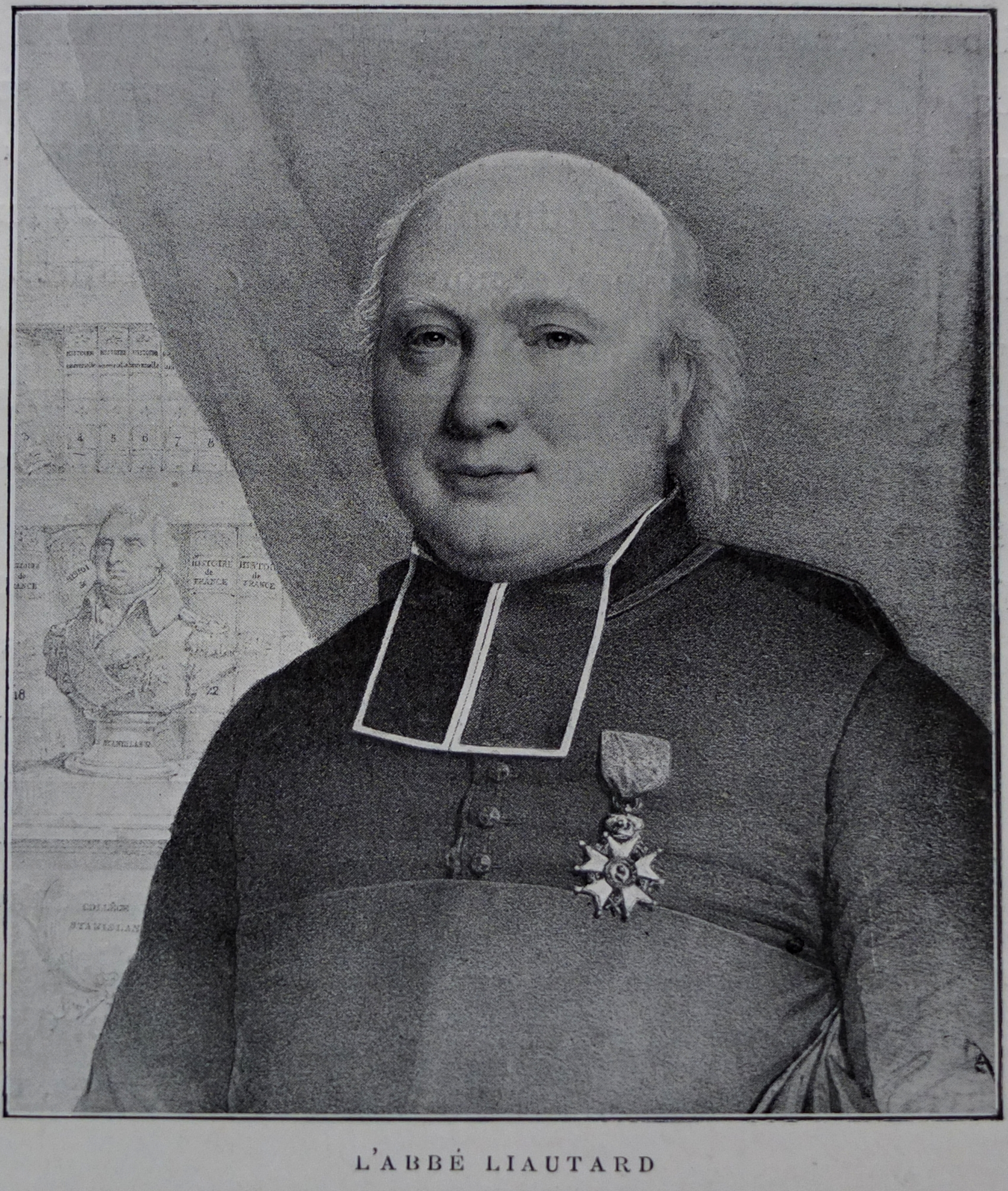
- Anonymous engraving published in 1905, based on a painting likely located at the Stanislas College.
- Born: 7 April 1774; Paris, France
- Died: 17 December 1842 (aged 68); Fontainebleau, France
- Occupation: Catholic priest
- Known for: Founder of Stanislas College

Claude Rosalie Liautard (7 April 1774 – 17 December 1842) was a French Catholic priest, founder of Collège Stanislas in Paris, and an author in the field of education.

== Biography ==
=== Birth and Early Life ===
Claude Rosalie Liautard was born in the Saint-Étienne-du-Mont parish in Paris. His baptism record, as noted by historian Georges Sauvé, was unusual: "On Friday, 7 April 1774, Claude Rosalie, said to be the son of Claude Liautard, bourgeois of Paris, and Rosalie de la Ramisse, was baptized. Born the same day on Rue du Fouarre and presented by Madame Dubois, midwife."

From an early age, his parentage appeared uncertain. While his father is named in the record, he was not present during the baptism. Liautard was raised in Versailles under the auspices of Marie-Antoinette, playing alongside other children in the circle of the future Duchess of Angoulême. Despite his apparent privilege and intelligence, the reasons for this royal favor remain unclear.

Some biographers, including Grandmaison y Bruno, suggest he was orphaned at four and adopted by a family friend with connections to Versailles. However, a note written by Liautard near the end of his life, seen by Abbé Oudry, hints that he may have been an illegitimate child of King Louis XV. This speculation aligns with rumors about his ancestry and his written work on the topic of "Foundlings."

=== Priesthood ===
Claude Liautard became a Catholic priest and engaged in various ecclesiastical missions. His dedication to education and the priesthood became a defining feature of his career.

Liautard is best known for founding Stanislas College in Paris, a leading Catholic educational institution.

Liautard spent his final years in Fontainebleau, where he died on 17 December 1842.

== Bibliography ==
- Gilbert-Félix de Grandmaison y Bruno, Vie de l’abbé Liautard, Jacques Lecoffre et Cie, Paris, 1855
- Collectif, Le Collège Stanislas, notice historique 1804-1870, Paris, 1881
- Georges Sauvé, "Le collège Stanislas, deux siècles d'éducation," Patrimoine et Medias, 1994, ISBN 9782910137069.
