= Jean-Marie de La Mennais =

French priest and Venerable

Venerable Jean-Marie de La Mennais F.I.C.P.
- Religious Founder
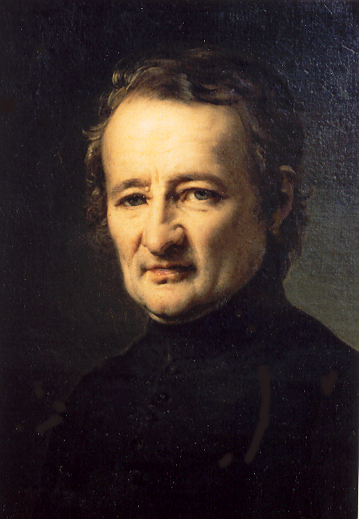
- Jean Marie de La Mennais painted by Paulin Guérin, circa 1827.
- Church: Catholic Church
- Other posts: Vicar General of the Dioceses of Rennes, Saint-Brieuc and New York

Orders
- Ordination: 4 May 1804 by Jean-Baptiste-Marie de Maille

Personal details
- Born: 8 September 1780 Saint-Malo, Brittany, Kingdom of France
- Died: 26 December 1860 (aged 80) Ploërmel, Morbihan, France
- Buried: Motherhouse of the Brothers of Christian Instruction, Ploërmel, Morbihan, France
- Parents: Robert de la Mennais (father); Marie des Saudrais (mother)
- Occupation: Cleric

Sainthood
- Venerated in: Catholic Church
- Title as Saint: Venerable
- Attributes: Priest attire Rosary; Book
- Patronage: Brothers of Christian Instruction
- Shrines: Motherhouse of the Brothers of Christian Instruction, Ploërmel, Morbihan, France

Jean-Marie Robert de La Mennais, FICP (or de Lamennais; 1780–1860) was a Breton Catholic priest and brother of the philosopher Felicité Robert de Lamennais, whom he influenced in their youth. He was a leading figure in the revival of the Catholic Church in France after the French Revolution, involved in founding three religious institutes as part of this effort.

Pope Paul VI proclaimed him to be Venerable in 1966 and his cause of canonization is ongoing.

== Life ==
=== Early life ===
Jean-Marie was born at Saint-Malo, then in the ancient Province of Brittany, on 8 September 1780, in family Robert de la Mennais. He is one of the sons of Robert de Lamennais, a wealthy merchant who had recently received a coat of arms from the king, and Marie des Saudrais. He was five years old when his mother died, and as a result, he and his younger brother were sent for education to an uncle, Robert des Saudrais, at La Chênaie, an estate near Saint-Malo.

During the period of the Revolution, the family sheltered non-juring priests who would lead Mass secretly in their home in the middle of the night. Jean-Marie began to express an interest in priesthood. In October 1790 he made his First Communion and received Confirmation from Gabriel Cortois de Pressigny, the last Bishop of Saint-Malo, who went into exile the following May. The Reign of Terror came to Brittany in December 1793. Their father Robert was arrested and barely escaped the guillotine.

Soon after he had returned from exile, Bishop Cortois de Pressigny installed Lamennais as a subdeacon on 21 December 1801 at the chapel of the Ursulines in Paris. The following year Lamennais helped the former rector of a secondary school previously run by the church, closed by the Revolution, to re-open the institution. To house the revived school, he and his brother, Hugues-Felicité purchased a former hospital. He was ordained a deacon at the Cathedral of Rennes on 24 September 1803 by Bishop Jean-Baptiste-Marie de Maille, Bishop of Rennes.

=== Pastor and author ===
Lamennais was ordained a priest by de Maille on 4 May 1804, and was quickly named vicar of the diocese for the region of Saint-Malo, based at the former cathedral of the local diocese there which had been suppressed under the recent Concordat of 1801 with the Holy See. In 1807, upon the death of the rector, the College of Saint-Malo was converted into a minor seminary and the Lamennais brothers both joined the faculty of the school.

Together the brothers wrote two major works, Reflections on the State of the Church in France in the 18th century and Its Current Situation and The Tradition of the Church on the Institution of Bishops, which they published anonymously in Paris in 1808. The books urged a religious revival in the nation with an active role by the clergy. They defended the Holy See as the true authority over the Catholic Church in France. The government of the Emperor Napoleon judged the ideas of the books dangerous and banned their further printing. The following year they published a translation of the work of the noted 16th-century spiritual writer, the Benedictine Abbot Louis de Blois.

In 1810 Lamennais was named a canon of the cathedral of Rennes. The seminary which he had helped to found, however, was closed in 1812 due to an imperial decree of the previous year affecting church instruction in the Empire. He was then appointed by the Bishop of Saint-Brieuc, Jean-Baptiste de Caffarelli du Falga, as vicar general for the diocese. At the same time, the family business had suffered from the blockade of France, enforced by Great Britain as part of the Napoleonic Wars, to such an extent that it went bankrupt and he was required to oversee the legal process of the liquidation of the family estate.

Upon the death of Caffarelli in January 1815, Lamennais was elected as the vicar of the cathedral chapter, placing the administration of the diocese in his hands. He immediately became active in supporting the faith of the people of the diocese, supporting the re-establishment of religious communities and schools, and reforming the seminaries of the region. He led parish missions throughout the diocese.

After the arrival of a new bishop for Saint-Brieuc in October 1819, Lamennais was appointed as vicar general of that diocese. He was also appointed as vicar of the Grand Almoner of France, in charge of charitable works throughout the nation. Lamennais threw himself tirelessly into the work required of him. In addition to his holding the office of Vicar General for Saint-Brieuc, the Bishop of Rennes, his canonical superior, appointed him simultaneously to that same office for his own diocese. In addition to these other duties, he took an active role in the founding of the Congregation of St. Peter, dedicated to the administration of the diocesan seminary and of parish missions, having to act as its Superior General for a brief period. One prelate, Bishop John Dubois of New York, was so impressed by Lamennais' dedication and capability after receiving help from him, that he appointed him vicar general for his own diocese in the United States.

=== Founder ===
As he carried out his ministry, Lamennais became aware of a great problem of juvenile delinquency among the children of the working class, especially among the Breton population, who frequently had no access to education. He became convinced that education was a major means to combat this problem and sought to find a way to provide teachers to the rural population of the region. For this, he worked in the establishment of two religious congregations in the region.

==== Daughters of Providence ====
In November 1816, under the guidance of Lamennais, three young women formed a religious community dedicated to the education of the local youth and the care of orphans. The women were allowed to make private vows on Christmas Day 1818, and, after doing a canonical novitiate, they made religious profession on the Feast of the Assumption 15 August 1819 and were formally established as a congregation of religious sisters in 1821 called the Daughters of Providence. Their motherhouse is in Rennes.

==== Brothers of Christian Instruction ====
Lamennais was also concerned about the needs of the young boys in his diocese, and sought teachers for them. He initially sought the help of the Brothers of the Christian Schools, founded by John Baptist de la Salle to educate poor boys. He was stymied, however, as the regulations of those Brothers forbade their working alone, while the mission he envisioned often needed only one teacher for an isolated location with a small student population. He began to recruit young men he found working in the fields whom he considered capable of learning. He brought them into his own home and provided them a basic education.

Lamennais learned of the establishment of a small group of religious brothers by Gabriel Deshayes (1767-1841), pastor of Auray and vicar general of the Diocese of Vannes. They agreed to cooperate and, to this end, they signed an agreement on 6 June 1819 to provide their people teachers of "solid piety".

With the arrival of the new bishop, Lamennais was able to direct more of his energies to this project. In response to this, the two priests began to recruit men to commit themselves to this life as part of a religious community. The first recruits received their canonical training from the Brothers of the Christian Schools. They then made a spiritual retreat at Auray, at the end of which, on 15 September 1820, they took religious vows, through which the institute became formally established as the Brothers of Christian Instruction.

The community was successful and began to grow. Deshayes obtained a house in Ploërmel, which became their motherhouse in 1824.

==== Missionaries of Rennes ====
As part of his effort at the renewal of theological education for the local clergy and the spiritual life of the people of the diocese, Lamennais gathered a group of men to work in these ministries, both clergy and laymen, which was based at Saint-Méen, who were called the Missionaries of Rennes. Soon after this, disillusioned with the failure of his vision, his brother Félicité withdrew to the family estate of La Chênaie. Joined by a group of his supporters, there they formed a religious community called the Society of St. Peter. Soon the men recruited by Jean-Marie asked to be incorporated into that community.

The community was then allowed to make religious vows by the Bishop of Rennes and became the Congregation of St. Peter. A seminary was opened at Malestroit, located near the Brothers' Motherhouse at Ploërmel. Félicité remained at La Chênaie and taught the younger members of the new congregation and worked to spell out the ideas of his long-cherished project of forming a community of priests thoroughly equipped for the pressing needs he foresaw for the future of the Catholic Church in France. By 1829, however, Félicité had withdrawn from all involvement in the church, at which point Jean-Marie was appointed by the bishop as the superior general of the small congregation.

The members of the congregation still at the estate left for the seminary, and the congregation became one exclusively composed of clergy, taking the formal name of Mission Priests of the Immaculate Conception. At the time of Lamennais' death, there were some 200 members living in nine communities. It ceased to exist with the dissociation of religious orders in France.

=== Death ===
After the death of Deshayes, Lamennais became the full-time superior of the brothers and lived at the motherhouse. By the time of his death in December 1860, the brothers had 852 members serving throughout France and its far flung colonies in the world, from French Guiana to Senegal.

== Legacy ==
The Brothers of Christian Instruction have expanded their service throughout the world. As of the early 21st century, they had schools in Europe, Africa, North and South America and in Asia.

In 1897 the Sisters established their first overseas mission in Canada, later followed by a school in England in 1903.

=== Veneration ===
Theologians approved Lamennais's spiritual writings on 11 December 1907. His cause was formally opened on 22 March 1911, granting him the title of Servant of God. He was subsequently declared Venerable.

== Bibliography ==
- Dégert, A. (1910), Jean-Marie-Robert de Lamennais, in The Catholic Encyclopedia. New York: Robert Appleton Company.
