= Marc Girardin =

French writer and politician (1801–1873)

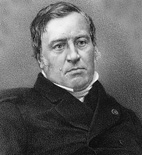
Marc Girardin

Saint-Marc Girardin (22 February 1801 – 1 April 1873) was a French politician and man of letters, whose real name was Marc Girardin.

== Biography ==
Girardin was born in Paris. In 1828 he started contributing to the Journal des Débats, where he remained on staff for nearly half a century. After the July Revolution and the accession of Louis Philippe as King of the French (the liberal July Monarchy), he was appointed professor of history at the Sorbonne and master of requests in the Conseil d'État. Soon afterwards he exchanged his chair of history for one of poetry, continuing to contribute political articles to the Journal des Débats, and sitting as deputy in the Chamber from 1835 to 1848.

In 1833, he was charged with a mission to study German methods of education, and issued a report advocating the necessity of newer methods and of technical instruction. In 1844 he was elected a member of the French Academy.

During the Revolution of February 1848 Girardin was for a moment a minister, but after the establishment of the Second French Republic, he was not re-elected deputy in the National Assembly.

After the Franco-Prussian War, he was returned to the Bordeaux assembly by his old département — Haute-Vienne. His Orléanist tendencies and his objections to the Third Republic were strong, and although he at first supported Adolphe Thiers, he afterwards became a leader of the opposition to the president. He died in 1873 at Morsang-sur-Seine, before Thiers was driven from power. He was buried at Père Lachaise (Division 32).

== Works ==
His chief work is his Cours de littérature dramatique (1843–1863), a series of lectures better described by its second title De l'usage des passions dans le drame. The author examined dramatic passions, discussing the mode in which they are treated in ancient and modern drama, poetry and romance. The book, a defence of the ancients against the moderns, "did not", according to the Encyclopædia Britannica Eleventh Edition, "take into account the fact that only the best of ancient literature has come down to us." Girardin's oeuvre was, overall, very hostile toward Romanticism.

Girardin's other works included Essais de littérature (2 vols., 1844), made up chiefly of contributions to the Débats, his Notices sur l'Allemagne (1834), and many volumes of collected Souvenirs, Réflexions, etc., on foreign countries and passing events (including his notes on the period of Russian administration in the Danubian Principalities). His last major works were La Fontaine et les Fabulistes (1867) and an Étude sur J.-J. Rousseau (1870) which had appeared in the Revue des deux mondes.
