= Collège Stanislas de Paris =

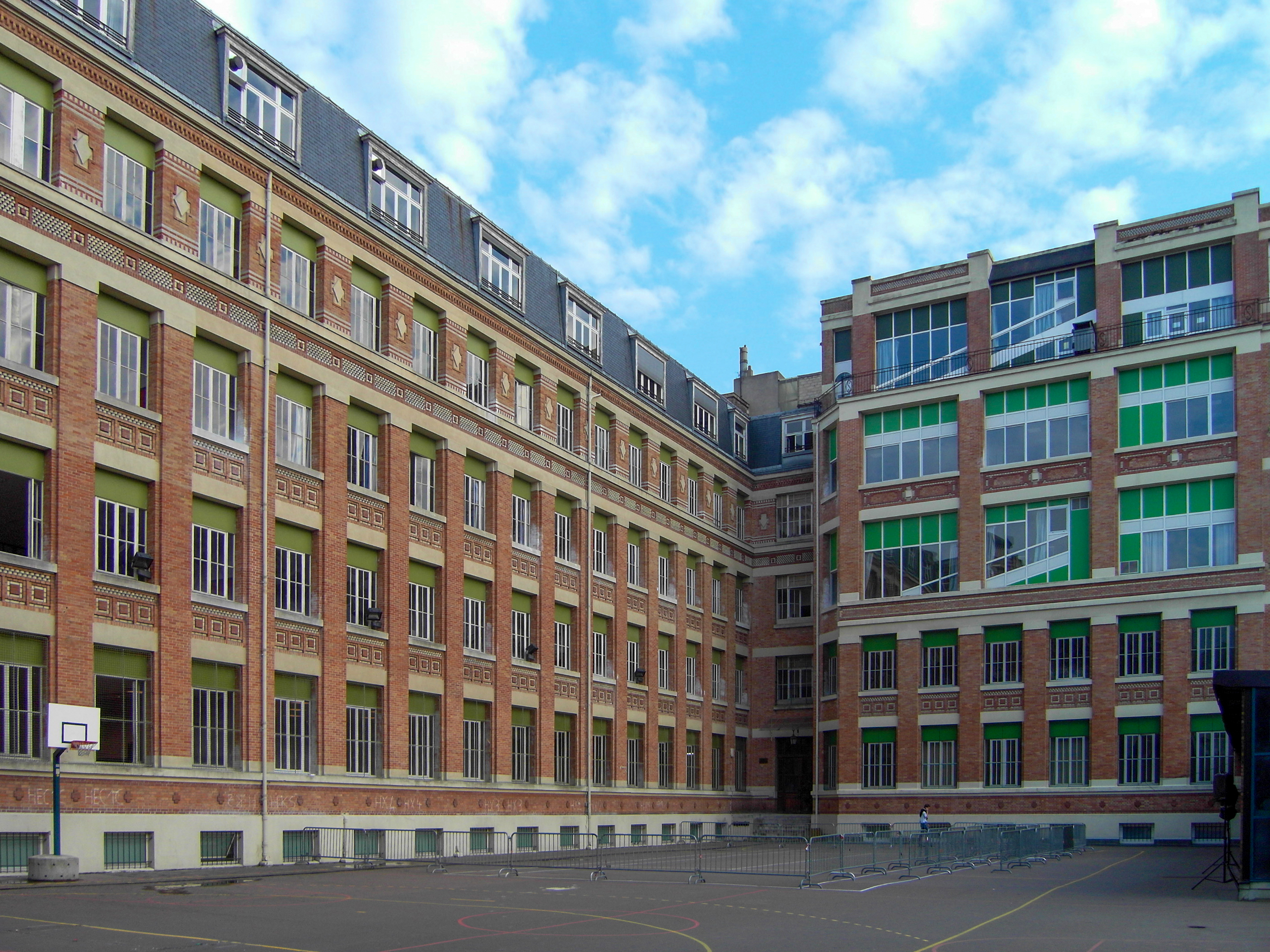
- The building preparatory classes courtyard side

Location
- 22 rue Notre-Dame-des-Champs; Paris; France
- 48°50′43″N 2°19′39″E

Information
- Motto: Français sans peur, chrétien sans reproche ('French without fear, Christian without reproach')
- Denomination: Catholic
- Opened: August 15th 1804
- Founder: Abbot Liautard
- Director: Igor le Diagon
- Enrolment: 3,660 (in 2023)
- National ranking: 4th
- Website: www.stanislas.fr (French)
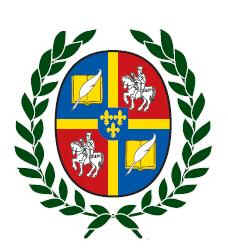

The Collège Stanislas de Paris (French pronunciation: [kɔlɛʒ stanislas də paʁi]), colloquially known as Stan, is a private Catholic school in Paris, situated on Rue Notre-Dame-des-Champs in the 6th arrondissement. It has more than 3,000 students, from preschool to classes préparatoires (classes to prepare students for entrance to the elite grandes écoles such as École Polytechnique, CentraleSupélec, ESSEC Business School, ESCP Business School and HEC Paris), and is the largest private school in France. Stanislas is considered one of the most prestigious and elite French schools. The school was ranked 1st from 2019 to 2022 for middle school and 1st in 2019 for high school.

== History ==
Founded in 1804 by Father Claude Liautard, the Collège has both traditional buildings and modern constructions. Under contract with the French government, it offers curricula identical to those of public education, also offering religious education on specific days - originally Wednesdays, but now, since the Jules Ferry Laws of 1882, on Saturdays. In 1822, its formal name was declared, after the Polish King Stanisław Leszczyński, the great-grandfather of the King of France Louis XVIII, whose second forename was "Stanislas".

Since 1903 Collège has been the property of a S.A. corporation founded by former alumni.

Private education in France was indirectly affected by the strong anti-clerical movement that inspired French politicians throughout the nineteenth and twentieth centuries, beginning with the Concordat of 1801. As a result, the Collège almost disappeared but ultimately was kept open by the efforts of former alumni. Even today, it remains isolated from Paris' foremost public Lycées, although Stanislas' "Classes Préparatoires" ultimately leads its students to the same Grandes Écoles as its rivals.

Originally a school for boys only, it became coeducational in 1992 through the absorption of the Institut Notre-Dame-des-Champs (also known as Nazareth). Parents are offered a choice between mixed or gender-segregated classes for the first four years of secondary school (usually between 11-12 to 14-15 years old).

== Famous alumni ==
The following are notable people associated with Collège Stanislas de Paris. If the person was a Collège Stanislas de Paris student, the number in parentheses indicates the year of graduation (if known); if the person was a faculty or staff member, that person's title and years of association are included.

- Pierre Duhem, physicist, philosopher and historian of physics
- General Charles de Gaulle, President of the French Republic
- King Alfonso XII of Spain
- Albert I, Prince of Monaco
- Louis II, Prince of Monaco
- King Charles Albert of Sardinia
- Grand Duke George Mikhailovich of Russia
- Prince Philippe, Duke of Orléans
- Prince Henri of Orléans
- Prince Luiz of Orléans-Braganza
- Roger Frey, President of the Constitutional Council of France
- Maurice Bourgès-Maunoury, Prime Minister of France
- Auguste Champetier de Ribes, President of the Council of the Republic of France
- Pierre Audi
- Francis Bouygues
- Jacques Cousteau
- Gustave Cunéo d'Ornano (1845–1906), lawyer, journalist and politician
- André Dauchez, painter
- Christian Dior
- Jean Bernard Léon Foucault (1819-1868), scientist of Foucault's pendulum fame
- Anatole France, Nobel Prize
- Carlos Ghosn
- Georges Guynemer
- Job
- Jacques Lacan
- Marcel L'Herbier
- Gilles Perrault
- Edmond Rostand
- Marc Sangnier
- Claude Simon, literature Nobel Prize
- Alain Soral
- Eugenie Niarchos
- Stavros Niarchos II
- Youssef Salim Karam, former Lebanese MP, descendant of Youssef Bey Karam
- Taittinger family

== See also ==
- Roger Ninféi
