= Gabriel Vanel =

- Archbishop Emeritus of Auch
- Church: Roman Catholic Church
- See: Archdiocese of Auch
- Predecessor: Maurice Rigaud
- Successor: Maurice Fréchard

Orders
- Ordination: 29 June 1949
- Consecration: 13 June 1970 by Jean Badré

Personal details
- Born: 12 January 1925; Ampuis, France
- Died: 1 March 2013 (aged 88); Toulouse, France

Gabriel Marie Étienne Vanel (12 January 1925 – 1 March 2013) was the Roman Catholic archbishop of the Archdiocese of Auch, France.

Ordained to the priesthood in 1949, Vanel was named bishop in 1970 and resigned in 1996.
