= Louis-Marcelin de Fontanes =

French poet and politician (1757–1821)

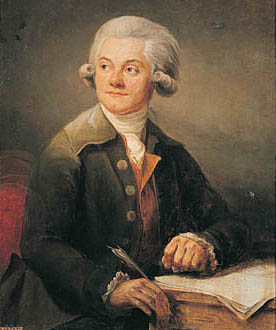
Louis Jean-Pierre de Fontanes.

Louis Jean-Pierre, marquis de Fontanes (6 March 1757 – 17 March 1821) was a French poet and politician.

== Biography ==
Born in Niort (Deux-Sèvres), he belonged to a noble Protestant family of Languedoc which had been reduced to poverty by the revocation of the edict of Nantes. His father Jean-Pierre Marcellin de Fontanes (1719–1774) and grandfather remained Protestant, but he was himself brought up as a Catholic. His parents died in 1774–1775, and in 1777 Fontanes went to Paris, where he found a friend in the dramatist Jean-François Ducis.

His first published poems, some of which were inspired by English models, appeared in the Almanach des Muses; Le Cri de mon coeur, describing his own sad childhood, in 1778; and La Fort de Navarre in 1780. His translation from Alexander Pope, L'Essai sur l'homme, was published with an elaborate preface in 1783, and La Chartreuse and Le Jour des morts in the same year, Le Verger in 1788 and his Epître sur l'édit en faveur des non-catholiques, and the Essai sur l'astronomie in 1789.

Fontanes was a moderate reformer, and in 1790 he became joint-editor of the Modérateur. He married at Lyon in 1792, and his wife's first child was born during their flight from the siege of that town. Fontanes was in hiding in Paris when the four citizens of Lyon were sent to the convention to protest against the cruelties of Collot d'Herbois. The petition was drawn up by Fontanes, and the authorship being discovered, he fled from Paris and found shelter at Sevran, near Livry, and afterwards at Andelys.

On the fall of Robespierre he was made professor of literature in the École Centrale des Quatre-Nations, and he was one of the original members of the institute. In the Memorial, a journal edited by Jean-François de la Harpe, he discreetly advocated reaction to the monarchical principle. He was exiled by the Directory and made his way to London, where he was closely associated with Chateaubriand.

He soon returned to France, and his admiration for Napoleon, who commissioned him to write an éloge on George Washington, secured his return to the Institute and his political promotion. In 1802 he was elected to the legislative chamber, of which he was president from 1804 to 1810. Other honors and titles followed. He has been accused of servility to Napoleon, but he had the courage to remonstrate with him on the judicial murder of the duc d'Enghien, and as grand master of the University of Paris (1808–1815) he consistently supported religious and monarchical principles. He acquiesced in the Bourbon restoration, and was made a marquis in 1817. He died on March 17, 1821, in Paris, leaving eight cantos of an unfinished epic poem entitled La Grèce sauvée.

The verse of Fontanes is polished and musical in the style of the 18th century. It was not collected until 1839, when Sainte-Beuve edited the Œuvres (2 vols.) of Fontanes, with a sympathetic critical study of the author and his career. But by that time the Romantic movement was in the ascendant and Fontanes met with small appreciation.

== See also ==
- Les Neuf Sœurs
