= Ambroise Rendu (educator) =

French educator and translator

- Born: 25 October 1778; Paris
- Died: 12 March 1860 (aged 81); Paris
- Occupations: Educator; Translator

Ambroise Rendu (25 October 1778 – 12 March 1860) was a French educator and translator.

== Principale publications ==
- Système de l'Université de France, ou Plan d'une éducation nationale, essentiellement monarchique et religieuse, formant le second supplément aux Observations sur le Discours de M. de Saint-Romain, concernant l'instruction publique et l'éducation (1816)
- Essai sur l'instruction publique, et particulièrement sur l'instruction primaire (3 volumes, 1819)
- De l'Instruction publique, et particulièrement des écoles chrétiennes, modèle de tous les perfectionnements actuels de l'instruction primaire (1819)
- Code universitaire, ou Lois et statuts de l'Université royale de France recueillis et mis en ordre par M. Ambroise Rendu (1827)
- Traité de morale à l'usage des écoles primaires (1834)
- Considérations sur les écoles normales primaires de France (1838)
- De l'Instruction secondaire et spécialement des écoles secondaires ecclésiastiques, ou de l'Alliance naturelle du Clergé et de l'Université pour l'éducation de la jeunesse (1842)
- De l'Association en général et spécialement de l'association charitable des Frères des écoles chrétiennes (1845)
- De l'Université de France et de sa juridiction disciplinaire (1847)
- Cours de pédagogie, ou Principes d'éducation publique à l'usage des élèves des écoles normales et des instituteurs primaires Texte en ligne

Translations

- Robinson dans son île, ou Abrégé des aventures de Robinson, à l'usage des écoles primaires (1846)
- Nouvelle traduction des Psaumes sur le texte hébreu (2 volumes, 1858)
