= Denis-Luc Frayssinous =

French prelate, statesman, orator and writer

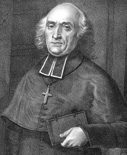
Denis-Antoine-Luc, comte de Frayssinous

Denis-Antoine-Luc, comte de Frayssinous (9 May 1765 – 12 December 1841) was a French prelate and statesman, orator and writer. He was the eighth member elected to occupy Seat 3 of the Académie Française in 1822.

== Biography ==
De Frayssinous was born of humble parentage at Curières, in the département of Aveyron. He owes his reputation mainly to the lectures on dogmatic theology, known as the conferences of Saint Sulpice, delivered in the church of Saint Sulpice, Paris, from 1803 to 1809, to which admiring crowds were attracted by his lucid exposition and by his graceful oratory. The freedom of his language in 1809, when Napoleon had arrested the pope and declared the annexation of Rome to France, led to a prohibition of his lectures; and the dispersion of the congregation of Saint Sulpice in 1811 was followed by his temporary retirement from the capital. He returned with the Bourbons, and resumed his lectures in 1814; but the events of the Hundred Days again compelled him to withdraw into private life, from which he did not emerge until February 1816.

As court preacher and almoner to Louis XVIII, he now entered upon the period of his greatest public activity and influence. In connection with the controversy raised by the signing of the reactionary concordat of 1817, he published in 1818 a treatise entitled Les vrais principes de l'Église gallicane sur la puissance ecclésiastique, which though unfavourably criticized by Lamennais, was received with favor by the civil and ecclesiastical authorities.

The consecration of Frayssinous as bishop of Hermopolis in partibus, his election to the Académie française, and his appointment to the grand-mastership of the university, followed in rapid succession. In 1824, on the accession of Charles X of France, he became minister of public instruction and of ecclesiastical affairs under the administration of Jean-Baptiste, Comte de Villèle; and about the same time he was created a peer of France with the title of count. His term of office was chiefly marked by the recall of the Jesuits.

In 1825 he published his lectures under the title Défense du christianisme. The work passed through 15 editions within 18 years, and was translated into several European languages. In 1828 he, along with his colleagues in the Villèle ministry, was compelled to resign office, and the subsequent revolution of July 1830 led to his retirement to Rome. Shortly afterwards he became tutor to the duke of Bordeaux (Comte de Chambord) at Prague, where he continued to live until 1838. He died at Saint-Geniez-d'Olt on 12 December 1841.

== Literary quotations ==
The famous novel of Gustave Flaubert, Madame Bovary, mentions the Conferences of Saint Sulpice by the abbot Frayssinous, habitual readings during the stay of Emma Rouault (not yet Bovary) in a nunnery.
