= Jean-Joseph Gaume =

French Roman Catholic theologian and author

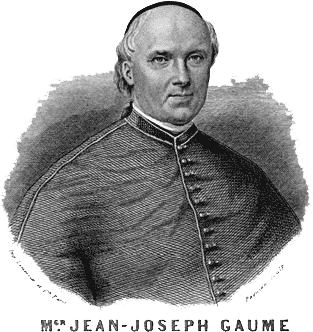
- Monseigneur Jean-Joseph Gaume
- Born: Jean-Joseph Gaume; June 5, 1802; Fuans, Doubs, France
- Died: November 19, 1879 (aged 77); 7th arrondissement of Paris, France
- Resting place: Cimetière des Longs Réages, Meudon, France
- Education: Grand Séminaire de Besançon; Charles University in Prague (Doctor of Theology)
- Occupations: Theologian, university professor, author, polemicist
- Known for: Ultramontanism, Gaumism, Catéchisme de persévérance
- Title: Protonotary apostolic (elevated 1854); Vicar General of Nevers (1843–1852); Canon of Nevers Cathedral (appointed 1828)
- Awards: Order of Saint Sylvester

Jean-Joseph Gaume (5 May 1802 – 19 November 1879) was a French Roman Catholic theologian and author.

== Life ==
Gaume was born at Fuans, Franche-Comté. Jean-Joseph Gaume entered the seminary of Besançon where he was taught by his older brother, Abbé Doney, and Abbé Gousset. He was deeply influenced by the writings of Abbé Nicolas-Sylvestre Bergier (particularly his Dictionnaire de théologie), as well as by Mennaisian and Liguorian influences. He was ordained in 1825. A curate in Vesoul, he was appointed professor of theology at the major seminary of Nevers in 1827—on the recommendation of Abbé Philippe Gerbet. He was subsequently superior of the minor seminary of Nevers (1828–31), titular canon (1828), and then vicar general from 1843 to 1852.

While attached to the Diocese of Nevers, he was successively professor of theology, director of the petit séminaire, canon, and vicar-general of the diocese, and had already published several works, when he left for Rome in 1841.

Pope Gregory XVI made him a knight of the Reformed Order of St. Sylvester. A doctor of theology of the University of Prague, a member of several societies of scholars, honorary vicar-general of several dioceses, he received from Pope Pius IX in 1854 the title of protonotary apostolic.

An ultramontane and a popularizer at heart, he authored numerous works, most of which were published by his brothers, editors in Paris, on theology, history, and education. Those in the first category were long held in high esteem, those in the second have fallen into oblivion, and those in the third raised the question of the classics in religious education. The Abrégé (Abridgment) of his Catéchisme de persévérance, published in 1842, went through more than 70 editions up until 1933 and was published in over 900,000 copies.

Concerned by the religious issues of his time, he attributed the evils of the 19th century to the reintroduction of pagan texts into Catholic colleges during the Renaissance. He conceived a new way of educating youth and childhood, which consisted primarily of teaching more Christian authors within the classics, and notably composed the Catéchisme de la Persévérance("Catechism of Perseverance") for this purpose. The body of his ideas received the label "Gaumism." He also published around thirty textbooks for all grade levels in a series titled Bibliothèque des classiques chrétiens latins et grecs (Library of Latin and Greek Christian Classics).

He was particularly uncompromising toward revolutionaries, liberals, and socialists. From 1849 to 1850, he also maintained a correspondence with the counter-revolutionary thinker Juan Donoso Cortés, whose analyses he largely shared.

He lived for a long time under the protection of Gousset and Parisis, bishops of Reims and Arras, and found support above all in the articles of Louis Veuillot in L'Univers. Widely printed, he even had defenders in Canada, notably Alexis Pelletier, who won Henri-Raymond Casgrain over to his cause.

Abbé Jean-François Landriot, one of the most distinguished polemical writers of the era, refused to follow the opinions of Msgr Gaume and L'Univers on the question of classical antiquity.

Félix Dupanloup, the moderate bishop of Orléans, reproached him for breaking with Church tradition, which had favored a Christian interpretation of pagan works since the Council of Trent. His supporters maintained their demands, and Rome ultimately had to put an end to the controversy by ruling in favor of Msgr Gaume through a Brief from Pius IX, published in Msgr Gaume's book Pie IX et les études classiques.

He is buried in the Longs Réages Cemetery in Meudon.

== Works and the classics controversy ==
Gaume wrote numerous books treating of theology, history, and education. Those of the third gave rise to a debate the classics. The author blamed the Renaissance, as a resurrection of the paganism of antiquity, as the primal source of all the evil of his days. Such is the dominating idea of the works "Les Trois Rome" (1847), "Histoire de la societé domestique" (2 vols., 1854) and "La Révolution" (8 vols., 1856).

As a cure, it was necessary to devise a new method of moulding childhood and youth; this was to consist in catechetical instruction and the exclusion of pagan authors from classical studies. In support of this method he wrote "Catéchisme de Persévérance, ou Exposé de la Religion depuis l'origine du monde jusqu'à nos jours" (8 vols., 1854); "La Religion et l'Eternité" (1859); "Traité de l'Esprit Saint (1864). To this series of works belong his "Manuel du Confesseur" (1*54) and "l'Horloge de la Passion" (1857), which he translated from St. Alphonsus Liguori.

The reform, or rather the revolution—the word is his—which he deemed necessary in classic instruction he had indicated as early as 1835 in his book "Le Catholicisme dans l'éducation", without arousing much comment. He returned to the subject in 1851 in a work entitled "Le Ver rongeur des sociétés modernes ou le Paganisme dans l'Education". The patronage of two influential prelates — Thomas-Marie-Joseph Gousset, Archbishop of Reims, and Pierre Louis Parisis, Bishop of Arras — and above all the articles of Louis Veuillot in "L'Univers", which supported Gaume from the first, gained for his views a hearing which they had previously failed to secure, and provoked a lively controversy among Catholics.

After having shown that the intellectual formation of youth during the first centuries of the Church and throughout the Middle Ages was accomplished through the study of Christian authors (ch. i-vi), Gaume proceeds to prove that the Renaissance of the sixteenth century perverted education throughout Europe by the substitution of pagan writers for Christian authors. In support of his thesis, he brings forward the testimony of men (viii-ix) and of facts (x-xxv), indicating the influence of classical paganism on literature, speech, the arts, philosophy, religion, the family, and society. Gaume did not go so far as to exclude the pagan texts; he allowed them some place in the three highest classes (the course comprised eight), but banished them from the first five years.

Consulted by the professors of his petit séminaire as to the course to pursue, the Bishop of Orléans, Félix Dupanloup, addressed them a letter on classical teaching, in which he declared himself in favour of the existing regulations and methods, thus preserving for the ancient authors the rank they had hitherto held, but at the same time assigned an important place to Holy Scripture, the Fathers, and modern authors. Sharply attacked by Veuillot in L'Univers, the bishop retorted by issuing a pastoral on the classics and especially on the interference of lay journalism in episcopal administration, and concluded by enjoining on the professors of his petits séminaires to receive no longer L'Univers. Then the question became even more burning; newspaper articles, brochures, pamphlets, even books succeeded one another on this question which created a general commotion among educationists. Gaume published in support of his thesis the Lettre sur le paganisme dans l'éducation. For a time it seemed as though the diocese were on the point of division.

At this juncture, Dupanloup drew up a declaration which was signed by forty-six prelates. It contained four articles, of which two dealt with journalism in its relations with episcopal authority, and two dealt with the use of the classics. It was therein stated:

1. that the employment of the ancient classics in secondary schools, when properly chosen, carefully expurgated, and explained from a Christian point of view, was neither evil nor dangerous;
2. that, however, the use of these ancient classics should not be exclusive, but that it was useful to join to it in becoming measure, as is generally done in all houses directed by the clergy, the study and explanation of Christian authors.

Gaume and his partisans lost no time in reducing their claims to the three following points:

1. the more comprehensive expurgation of pagan writers;
2. the more extensive ìntroduction of Christian authors;
3. the Christian teaching of pagan authors.

Nevertheless, it required instructions from Rome to put an end to this controversy. Gaume published further: "Bibliothèque des classiques chrétiens, latins et grecs" (30 vols., 1852–55); "Poètes et Prosateurs profanes complètement expurgés" (1857).

== Major works ==
- Du Catholicisme dans l'éducation, ou l'Unique moyen de sauver la science et la société (On Catholicism in Education, or the Only Way to Save Science and Society), 1835
- Le Grand jour approche, ou Lettres sur la première communion (The Great Day Approaches, or Letters on First Communion), 1836
- Le Seigneur est mon partage, ou Lettres sur la persévérance après la première communion (The Lord is My Share, or Letters on Perseverance After First Communion), 1836
- Abrégé du catéchisme de persévérance, ou Exposé historique, dogmatique, moral et liturgique de la religion, depuis l'origine du monde jusqu'à nos jours (Abridgment of the Catechism of Perseverance, or Historical, Dogmatic, Moral, and Liturgical Exposition of Religion, from the Origin of the World to the Present Day), 1842
- Manuel des confesseurs (Manual for Confessors), 1843 Online text
- Histoire de la société domestique chez tous les peuples anciens et modernes, ou Influence du christianisme sur la famille (History of Domestic Society Among All Ancient and Modern Peoples, or the Influence of Christianity on the Family), 1844
- L'Europe en 1848, ou Considérations sur l'organisation du travail, le communisme et le christianisme (Europe in 1848, or Considerations on the Organization of Labor, Communism, and Christianity), 1848
- La Profanation du dimanche considérée au point de vue de la religion, de la société, de la famille, de la liberté, du bien-être, de la dignité humaine et de la santé (The Desecration of Sunday Considered from the Viewpoint of Religion, Society, Family, Freedom, Well-being, Human Dignity, and Health), 1850
- Le Ver rongeur des sociétés modernes, ou le Paganisme dans l'éducation (The Gnawing Worm of Modern Societies, or Paganism in Education), 1851
- Lettres à Msgr Dupanloup, évêque d'Orléans, sur le paganisme dans l'éducation (Letters to Msgr Dupanloup, Bishop of Orléans, on Paganism in Education), 1852
- Bibliothèque des classiques chrétiens, latins et grecs (Library of Latin and Greek Christian Classics), 1852-1855
- Catéchisme de Persévérance, ou Exposé de la Religion depuis l'origine du monde jusqu'à nos jours (Catechism of Perseverance, or Exposition of Religion from the Origin of the World to the Present Day), 1854
- La Révolution, recherches historiques sur l'origine et la propagation du mal en Europe, depuis la Renaissance jusqu'à nos jours (The Revolution: Historical Research on the Origin and Propagation of Evil in Europe, from the Renaissance to the Present Day), 12 vols., 1856 Online text: 1 2 3 4 5 6 7 8 9 10 11 12
- Les Trois Rome (The Three Romes), 4 vols., 1857 Online text: 1 2 3 4
- Horloge de la Passion ou Réflexions et affections sur les souffrances de Jésus-Christ (Clock of the Passion, or Reflections and Affections on the Sufferings of Jesus Christ), translated from the Italian after Saint Alphonse de Liguori, 1857
- Poètes et prosateurs profanes complètement expurgés (Secular Poets and Prose Writers Completely Expurgated), 1857
- La Religion et l'Éternité (Religion and Eternity), 1859
- La Situation : douleurs, dangers, devoirs, consolations des catholiques dans les temps actuels (The Situation: Sorrows, Dangers, Duties, Consolations of Catholics in Present Times), 1860
- A quoi sert le Pape ? (What is the Pope For?), 1861 Online text
- Bethléem, ou l'École de l'enfant Jésus, petites visites à la crèche pour le temps de Noël, d'après saint Alphonse de Liguori (Bethlehem, or the School of the Child Jesus: Short Visits to the Crèche for Christmas Time, after Saint Alphonse de Liguori), 1860
- Le signe de la croix au XIXe siècle (The Sign of the Cross in the 19th Century), 1862, honored with a brief from Pope Pius IX.
- Abrégé du catéchisme de persévérance (Abridgment of the Catechism of Perseverance), 1865
- Traité du Saint Esprit, comprenant l'histoire générale des deux esprits qui se disputent l'empire du monde et des deux cités qu'ils ont formées, avec les preuves de la divinité du Saint Esprit (Treatise on the Holy Spirit, Comprising the General History of the Two Spirits Disputing the Empire of the World and of the Two Cities They Formed, with Proofs of the Divinity of the Holy Spirit), 1865 Online text, reissued by Éditions Delacroix.
- L'Eau bénite au XIXe siècle (Holy Water in the 19th Century), 1866
- Credo, ou Refuge du chrétien dans les temps actuels (Credo, or the Christian's Refuge in Present Times), 1867
- Histoire du bon larron au XIXe siècle (History of the Good Thief in the 19th Century), 1868
- La Vie n'est pas la vie, ou la Grande erreur du XIXe siècle (Life is Not Life, or the Great Error of the 19th Century), 1869
- Judith et Esther. Mois de Marie du XIXe siècle (Judith and Esther: Month of Mary of the 19th Century), 1870, reissued by Éditions Delacroix.
- Suéma, ou la Petite esclave africaine enterrée vivante, histoire contemporaine (Suéma, or the Little African Slave Buried Alive: A Contemporary History), 1870
- Où en sommes-nous ? : étude sur les événements actuels : 1870 et 1871 (Where Do We Stand?: A Study of Current Events: 1870 and 1871), 1871 Online text
- Voyage à la côte orientale d'Afrique pendant l'année 1866 par le R. P. Horner (Voyage to the East Coast of Africa During the Year 1866 by the Reverend Father Horner), 1872
- Le Cimetière au XIXe siècle (The Cemetery in the 19th Century), 1873
- L'Angélus au XIXe siècle (The Angelus in the 19th Century), 1873
- La Génuflexion au XIXe siècle, ou Étude sur la première loi de la création (Genuflection in the 19th Century, or Study on the First Law of Creation), 1876
- Petit catéchisme du Syllabus (Little Catechism of the Syllabus), 1876
- Histoire des catacombes de Rome (History of the Catacombs of Rome), 1876
- Le Testament de Pierre le Grand, ou la Clef de l'avenir (The Testament of Peter the Great, or the Key to the Future), 1876
- Mort au cléricalisme, ou Résurrection du sacrifice humain (Death to Clericalism, or Resurrection of Human Sacrifice), 1877
- La Révolution (The Revolution), 1877
- Le Bénédicité au XIXe siècle, ou Religion dans la famille (The Grace Before Meals in the 19th Century, or Religion in the Family), 1878
- Le Scrupule, petit manuel de direction à l'usage des âmes timorées et de leurs confesseurs, d'après saint François de Sales et saint Alphonse de Liguori (Scruple: A Small Manual of Direction for the Use of Timid Souls and Their Confessors, after Saint Francis de Sales and Saint Alphonse de Liguori), 1879
- L'Évangélisation apostolique du globe, preuve de la divinité du christianisme (The Apostolic Evangelization of the Globe: Proof of the Divinity of Christianity), 1879
- Biographies évangéliques (Gospel Biographies), 2 vols., 1881-1893
- Les mystères du diable dévoilés (The Mysteries of the Devil Unveiled), 1880.
