= L'Observateur français =

French Catholic newspaper

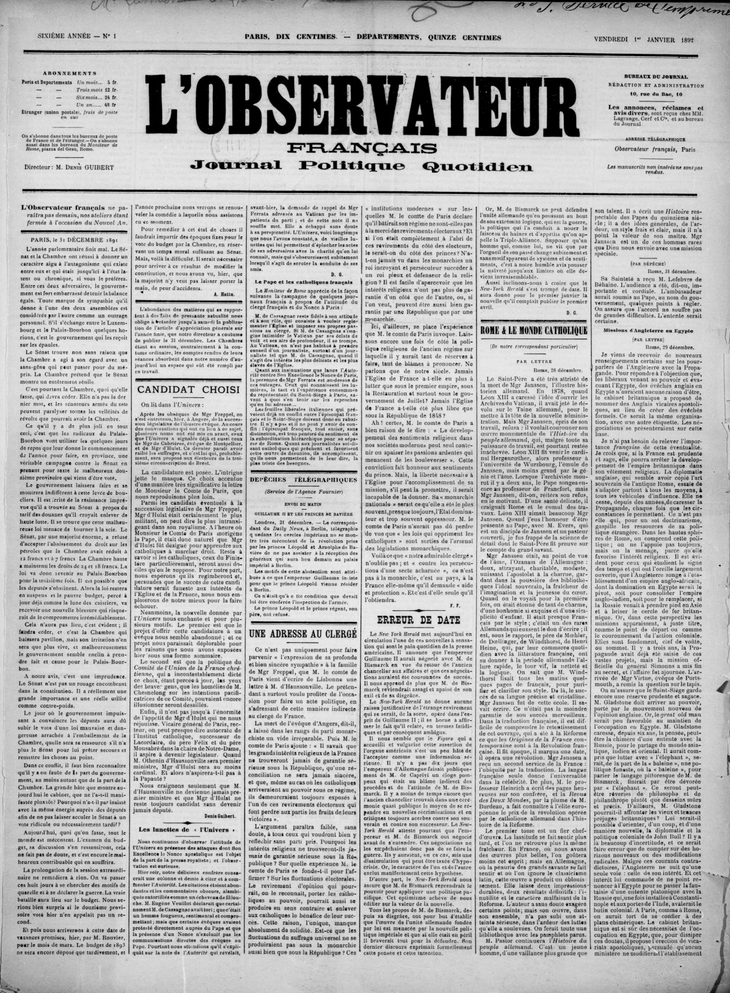
- L'Observateur français on January 1, 1892.
- Founded: 1887
- Ceased publication: 1895
- Language: French
- Headquarters: Paris
- Country: France
- Price: 10 centimes

L'Observateur français was a French daily Catholic newspaper published in Paris between 1887 and 1895.

The first issue of L'Observateur français appeared on May 6, 1887. This new evening political newspaper was directed by Joseph Denais, who had resigned a few weeks earlier as the director and editor-in-chief of La Défense, where he had been replaced by Jules Auffray. Among the founders and backers of the new daily were Léon-Benoît-Charles Thomas, Archbishop of Rouen, and Charles-François Turinaz, Bishop of Nancy.

As a proponent of the ideas of Pope Leo XIII, L'Observateur français followed the editorial stance of the Moniteur de Rome and, more importantly, the Vatican's official organ, L'Osservatore Romano, which inspired its title. Denais announced that the newspaper aligned with the principles of the encyclical Immortale Dei and aimed to remain above party disputes, maintaining independence from the royalist stance of much of the French Catholic press. According to Henri des Houx, L'Observateur was founded to "kill off L'Univers" by Eugène Veuillot.

In early May 1888, the newspaper changed ownership. Denais was replaced by Denis Guibert as director and editor-in-chief.

Remaining true to its principles, L'Observateur français supported the encyclical Au milieu des sollicitudes and the policy of rallying Catholics to the Republic. In 1893, the newspaper embraced efforts of reconciliation expressed by moderate republicans, later known as the "esprit nouveau". An article titled "Désarmement" ("Disarmament"), published on June 15, 1893, stated that "the struggle is over" with the Republicans. This declaration was approved by the Pope via his Cardinal Secretary of State, Cardinal Rampolla.

The last issue of the daily was published on May 6, 1895.

On December 25 of the same year, L'Observateur français was revived as a weekly under the direction of Charles Deleau, with Yvanhoé Rambosson as editor-in-chief. In 1902, the title was taken over by Abbé Pierre Dabry, launching another short-lived weekly with only 35 issues.
