= Maurice Duval =

French general (1869–1958

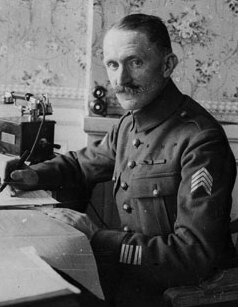
- Duval in 1917
- Born: June 5, 1869; Bayonne, Pyrénées-Atlantiques, France
- Died: August 23, 1958 (aged 89); 16th arrondissement of Paris, Seine, France
- Education: Saint-Joseph of Reims; École spéciale militaire de Saint-Cyr
- Spouse: Marie Joséphine Lucienne Yvonne Teisserenc (m. 1894)
- Military career
- Allegiance: France
- Branch: French Army; French Air and Space Force
- Service years: 1888 – 1938
- Rank: Général de brigade
- Commands: 6th Army
- Conflicts: World War I: First Battle of Champagne (WIA)

Marie Victor Charles Maurice Duval (1869–1958) was a French brigadier general and aviator of World War I. He was one of the main organizers of the Armée de l'Air and was a Commander of the Legion of Honour.

== Military education and training ==
Maurice was born on June 5, 1869, at Bayonne as the son of General Léon Duval who commanded the 77th Infantry Regiment and Louise Marie Elisabeth Mathilde (née de Leigonye). He attended the Saint-Joseph of Reims with a bachelor's degree in arts and sciences. After that, Duval enrolled in the École spéciale militaire de Saint-Cyr on October 25, 1888, after passing the entrance exams, ranking 183 out of 450. He was promoted to Corporal on August 20, 1889, and to Sergeant on October 1, 1889, before graduating as part of the Class of 1889.

Upon graduating from the academy, he gained his commission of Second Lieutenant within the 27th Infantry Regiment October 1, 1890, but was transferred to the 122nd Infantry Regiment sixteen days later which was stationed at Montpellier. Duval was promoted to First Lieutenant on October 1, 1892, and began taking lessons at the Valbonne Shooting Club from 1892 to 1893 and ranked 42 out of 57 by the end of his class and was assigned to the 36th Infantry Regiment on August 1, 1894. Around this time, Duval married Marie Joséphine Lucienne Yvonne Teisserenc on October 1, 1894, and they had two boys and two girls. On April 25, 1899, he was assigned to the 142nd Infantry Regiment and was given a letter of satisfaction on July 7, 1899, by the French Minister of War, Camille Krantz for his studies conducted in 1898. By August 16, 1901, he was within the 15th Infantry Regiment and staff of the 6th Army Corps on November 1, 1902.

== Captain and Intern of Japan ==
He was promoted to Captain of the 68th Infantry Regiment on January 31, 1902, and seconded to the staff of the 83rd Brigade on December 24, 1904, before being appointed Orderly Officer to the Commanding General on January 25, 1905. He was then made the General Governor of Lille on May 25, 1906, before given another Letter of Satisfaction by Eugène Étienne for his conferences in Lille during the winter of 1906 and 1907.

On April 24, 1907, Duval enrolled in a two-year internship within the Imperial Japanese Army and stayed in Japan from June 9, 1907, to July 12, 1909. By the time he completed his training, he received a congratulatory letter by Georges Picquart for his completion of the training.

== Return to France ==
During his return to France, Duval was assigned to the 101st Infantry Regiment on October 11, 1909, before being transferred to the 103rd Infantry Regiment at Alençon on June 10, 1911. On July 12, 1911, Duval received the Knight of the Legion of Honour and an officer of the Order of the Dragon of Annam for his service in Japan on November 25, 1911. He also received the Knight of the Order of Agricultural Merit on February 6, 1912, the Officer of the Order of Cambodia on March 24, 1912, and was transferred to the 9th Infantry Battalion on January 9, 1913, as well as appointed a staff officer of Eugène Étienne on January 17, 1913, before being a member of the private staff on July 3, 1914.

== World War I ==
Upon the French entry into World War I, Duval was made Battalion Commander while he was a Lieutenant Colonel but was seriously wounded during the First Battle of Champagne. For his service in the battle, Duval received the Croix de guerre 1914–1918 on September 20, 1915. His citation read:

Constantly in reconnaissance on the front in the most advanced trenches, rendered particularly brilliant services as deputy chief of staff of an army by a real understanding of situations, tireless activity, communicative enthusiasm and a remarkable spirit of initiative.

He also received the Knight of the Legion of Honour on November 11, 1915, as well as given command of the 314th Infantry Brigade. He was then made the Chief of Staff of the 6th Army, the 1st Army and the Army Group Centre which was commanded by Marshal Émile Fayolle. During 1917, Duval was promoted to Colonel but after the dismissal of the head of the Grand Quartier Général, Robert Nivelle, Duval began to shift careers. After Philippe Pétain succeeded him, he noticed Duval's previous experience and appointed him as commanding operator on August 3, 1917. was then promoted to Général de brigade on April 19, 1918.

== Aviation career ==
As the director of the aviation division within GQG, Duval was responsible for securing the necessary materials and assets available to the civil government while the one responsible for the production of aeronautics was Jacques-Louis Dumesnil which was retained after Georges Clemenceau took office as prime minister of France. After the failure of the Kerensky Offensive and the Russian Civil War, the French command were expecting a violent clash with the Germans and General Pétain sought to contain it. Duval's role in this operation was to take advantage of the French manufacturing in aircraft and engines which gave the French an advantage over the Germans in aviation. He also discovered the combinations of SPAD S.XIII models with Hispano-Suiza 8B 200-hp engines and Bréguet 14 models with Renault 12F 300-hp engines which allowed for more efficient French biplane bombers.

During 1918, Duval was made the Aide-Major General of military aeronautics and was given command of the 1st Air Division on May 15, 1918, and commanded the division until the end of the war. After the conclusion of World War I, he became part of the management committee of the Aéro-Club de France after being introduced to it by André Michelin and R. Soreau on March 10, 1921. He then became president of the Comité Français de Propagande Aéronautique on 1925. Around the same time, Duval engaged within CFRNA from 1920 to 1932 with Romanian diplomat Nicolae Titulescu. He was also the director of the Le Figaro subsidiary, Eaux de Garges.

After receiving the Commander of the Legion of Honour on July 7, 1927, he became president of the engineering company Salmson and specified in producing Canton-Unné 2M7 engines from 1935 to 1938 until retirement. He died at the 16th arrondissement of Paris on August 23, 1958.

== Works ==
- Les leçons de la guerre d'Espagne (preface by General Maxime Weygand), Plon, 1938, p. 247
- Les Espagnols et la guerre d'Espagne, Plon, 1939, p. 237
