= Eugène Veuillot =

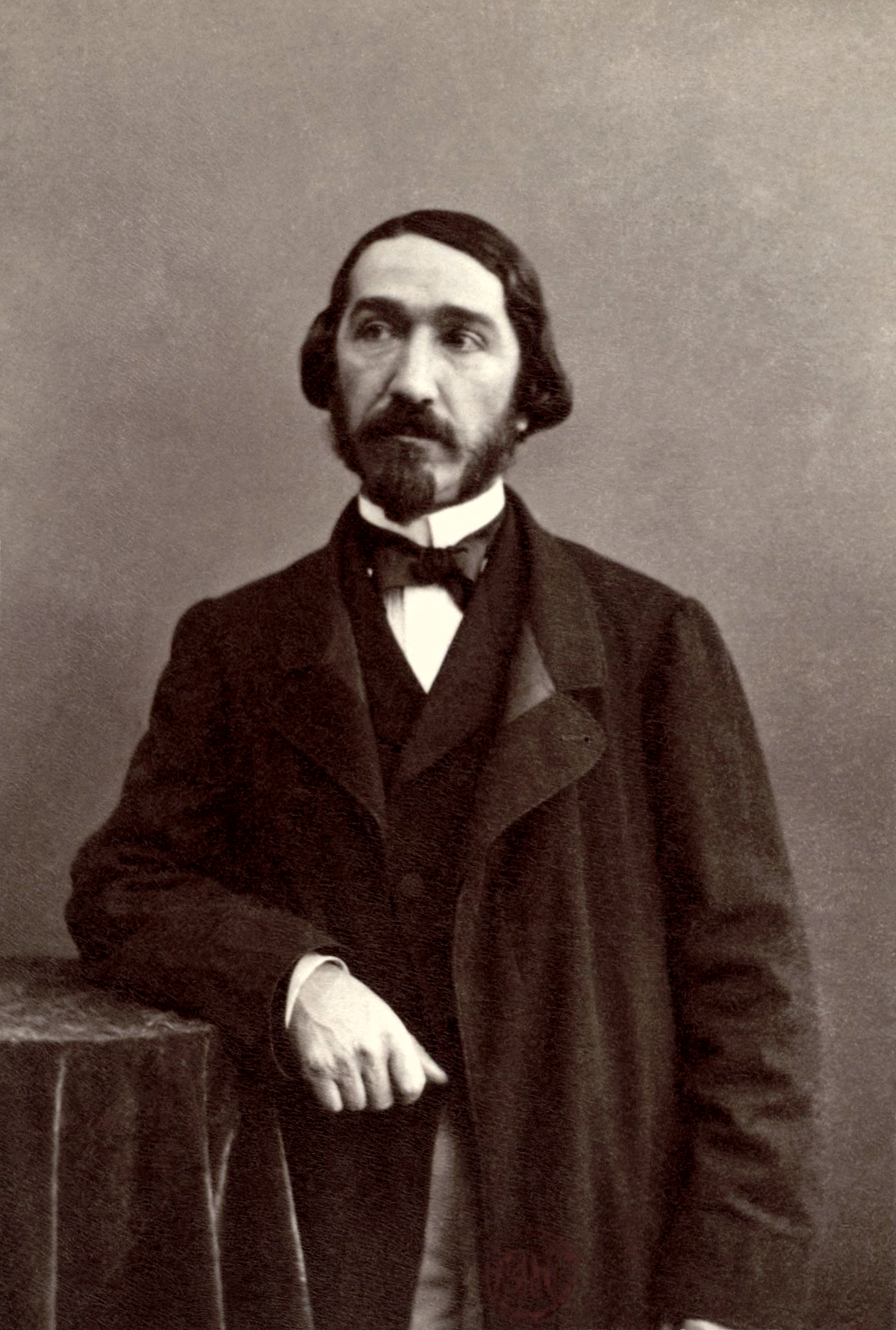
- Born: October 5, 1818; Boynes, France
- Died: September 18, 1905 (aged 86); Paris, 7th arrondissement
- Occupations: Journalist, Editor
- Movement: Veuillotism

Eugène Veuillot (October 5, 1818 – September 18, 1905) was a French journalist who, alongside his brother Louis and later with his sons François and Pierre, directed the Catholic-oriented newspaper L'Univers.

== Biography ==
Eugène Veuillot was the brother of French journalist and writer Louis Veuillot, who was deeply committed to the fight for freedom of education and the founder of the Catholic newspaper L'Univers. Both brothers were shareholders of Union Générale, a Catholic bank whose spectacular collapse after extensive financial and industrial investments in France and abroad triggered the 1882 stock market crash, one of the 19th century's largest economic crises in France. Twenty years earlier, they had also participated in the ventures of André Langrand-Dumonceau, a Belgian banker whose family sought to create a powerful Catholic financial institution.

Eugène Veuillot authored around fifty works. A brilliant polemicist, he introduced the Ralliement to the Republic into the Catholic doctrine of "Veuillotism," as requested by Pope Leo XIII. During the Dreyfus Affair, he was initially hostile to Captain Alfred Dreyfus but was less antisemitic and less aggressive than La Croix, although he still participated in the general antisemitic sentiment of the time. After the discovery of the Henry forgery in September 1898, he supported revisiting the case, distinguishing himself from La Croix while remaining faithful to Catholicism. In L’Univers on October 10, 1899, he wrote that it was "absolutely unjust to extend to all Catholics, all priests, and all religious people the reproaches that could be justified by the attitude and language of some of them."

On October 4, 1858, in Paris, he married Louise d'Aquin (1837–1906), niece of Paul E. Poincy and sister of Anne-Lise d'Aquin, the wife of Dr. Charles Ozanam, brother of Frédéric Ozanam. This marriage linked two prominent Catholic families of the 19th century. He had five children, including Pierre Veuillot, also a journalist, and François Veuillot, who directed L’Univers from 1905 to 1912. Another child became an Augustinian nun. Eugène Veuillot was the grandfather of Cardinal Pierre Veuillot. His younger sister Élise Veuillot (1825–1911) was also a journalist.
