= Saint-Joseph of Reims =

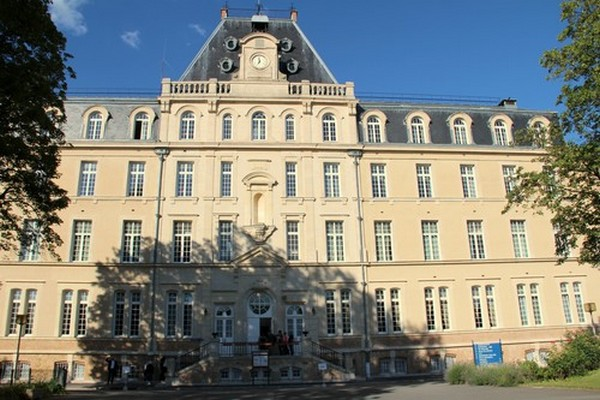
- Central building opened in October 1877, currently Jean-Jaurès high school

Location
- Reims, Marne, Grand Est; France; 49°14′51.04″N 4°2′5.02″E

Information
- Type: Private state-funded primary and secondary school
- Religious affiliation: Catholicism
- Denomination: Jesuit
- Established: 1874; 152 years ago
- Grades: K-12, including baccalaureate
- Gender: Co-educational
- Enrollment: 1,250
- Website: www.saint-joseph.com
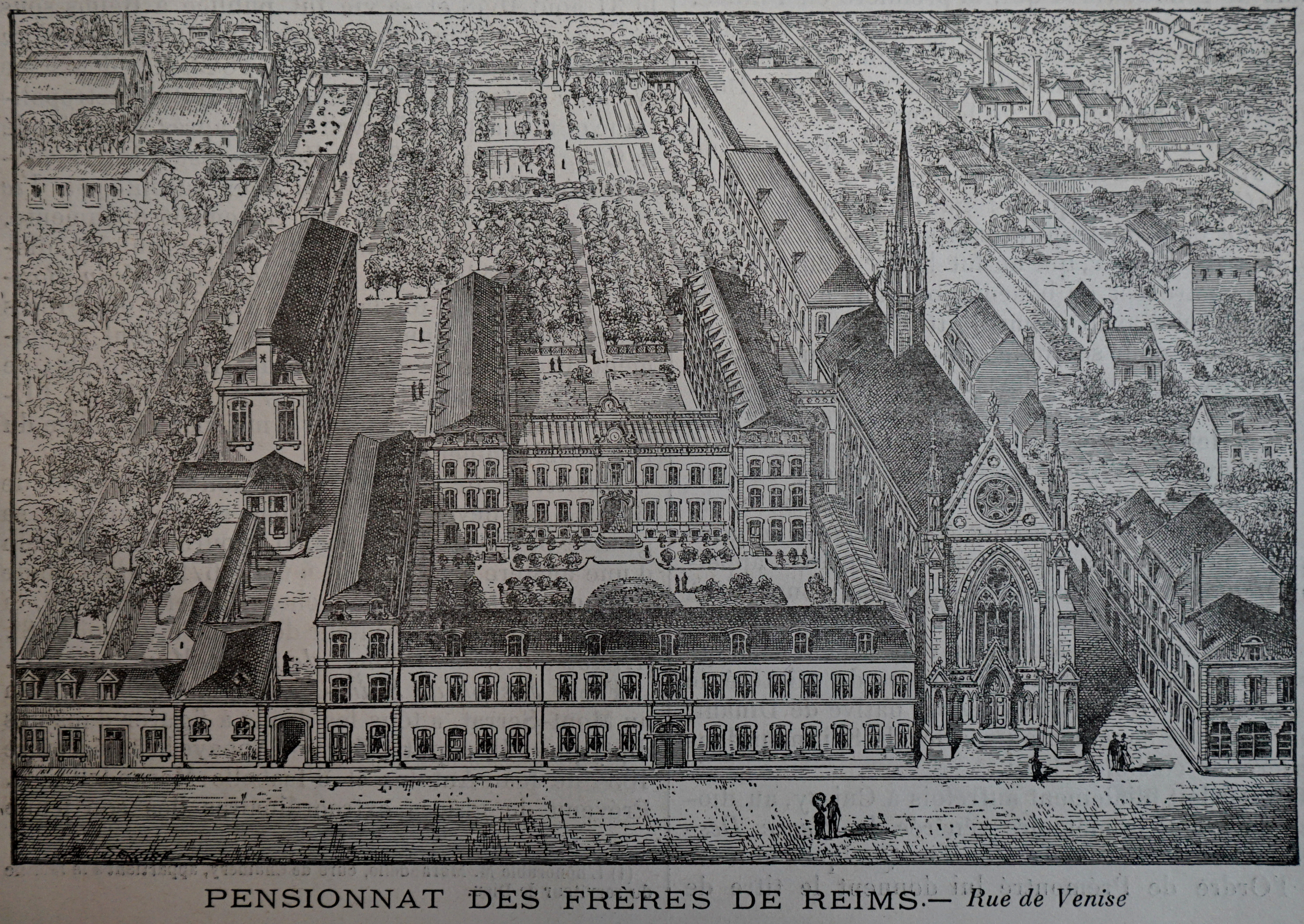

Saint-Joseph of Reims is a private state-supported Catholic primary and secondary school, located in Reims, in the Marne department of the Grand Est region of France. The co-educational school was founded by the Society of Jesus in 1874. The school is located between Capuchin, Venice, 'Équerre, and Moulins streets in Reims. It enrolls 1,250 students from kindergarten through baccalaureate and houses 340 boarding students.

== History ==
=== Collège du Faubourg Ceres (1874–1907) ===
==== Foundation (1874–1875) ====
The Jesuit fathers came to Reims in April 1866 at the request of the Abelé de Muller family, thanks to the intervention of Cardinal Gousset who obtained government authorization and the financial assistance of Baron de Sachs, to provide religious services for German-speaking families, especially Alsatians or Luxembourgers, who had come to Reims in large numbers in the preceding years.

After the war of 1870, and in anticipation of the forthcoming closure of the Collège Saint-Clement of Metz, steps were taken for the construction of a College. Bishop Landriot proposed to the Jesuits to take back the diocesan college of Rethel in exchange for the new college. The Jesuits bought the farm Grulet, 86 Faubourg Ceres, on 27 June 1872, along with a few other buildings at number 80, 82, and 84 of the Férbourg Ceres and a neighbouring garden, the "Jardin Petit". The provincial of the order came to Reims on 8 August 1874 to make the final decisions, and the École Libre Saint-Joseph opened its doors. Three classes were opened, fifth, sixth, and a preparatory course of seventh-eighth. In this first year 37 students were enrolled. Henri Mertian was rector and Fr. Hoffmann prefect.

==== Developmental period (1875–1880) ====
In the second school year the number of pupils was 100 in five classes, and the following year 160 pupils in six classes. In 1875 Fr. Mertian became minister and Fr. Cornaille rector. Mertian conceived the general plan of the College and began construction in 1875 of the central building parallel to the Rue David. This building, built by the architect Collignon opened in 1877. Fr. Cornaille was leading the Collège from 1875 to 1880 and Fr. Lacouture from 1875 to 1886. Apart from three or four lay professors, all the staff were Jesuits.

==== First tests (1880–1889) ====
On 9 March 1880 a decree of Jules Ferry prohibited unauthorized congregations from teaching, particularly naming the Jesuits, and prescribed the expulsion of religious from their colleges. Father Rollin and Archbishop Langenieux declared that everything would be done to save the school and to maintain the teaching methods and principles of the Society of Jesus.

The direction of the College was entrusted to canon Champenois, a former professor of philosophy at the Collège de Rethel; priests and religious people replaced the Jesuits.

At the beginning of 1881, Fr. Didier-Laurent, of the diocese of Saint-Dié, replaced the Canon Champenois as Superior of the College and held this office until 1889.

In 1886, Fr. Poisat succeeded Lacouture as prefect. In 1889 a new building on the Faubourg Ceres (now avenue Jean-Jaures) was inaugurated to replace the temporary accommodations.

==== Return of the Jesuits (1889–1901) ====
In 1889, enrolment exceeded 300. Fr. Rousselin again became Rector in 1889.

In October 1898, an annex of the College called "Small College of St, Stanislaus" was opened by the Jesuits, then, after their expulsion in 1901, led by Fr. Frezet. The classes were taught by the Brothers of Christian Instruction of Ploërmel, who had helped with this teaching since 1893. This "Small Collège" lasted until 1903. In 1900, Fr. Armand Poirier took over as rector.

Due to the Law on Congregations 1901, the Jesuits were again obliged to leave the College. The Jesuits left the College in 1901 and in 1902 founded a College in Florennes, Belgium.

The college, now École Saint-Joseph, reopened in October 1901 and was led by Auguste Gindre.

On 25 September 1904, the Brothers of Christian Instruction were expelled from their boarding school on the Rue de Venise. On 17 December 1906, Cardinal Luçon was expelled from the Archdiocese, and all major and minor seminaries were closed: the tribunal had appointed a liquidator. The Civil Society, which administered the College financially, claimed the allocation of its property for its benefit. but its rights were contested by the liquidator. On 6 August 1907 a judgment of the Court of Appeal awarded the liquidator the building of the Faubourg Ceres and the country house on the road to Louvois, which were placed under sequestration.

Former students hoped to buy the building of the Faubourg Ceres and, awaiting its adjudication, it was decided to resort for a year to temporary locations. The College was split into two: classes ten through twelve were installed under the direction of Fr. Charles in the buildings of an old free school in the parish of Saint-Jean-Baptiste on Flodoard street, placed at the College's disposal by Fr. Béguin, the parish pastor; the boarders of these classes were housed in the former convent of Divine Providence, 33 Saint-André Street.

At the instigation of the Alumni Committee a Society was set up, on the basis of an unassailable legality, to ensure the material life of the College, the "Société Rémoise Immobilière" and the Secondary Education Company, with capital of 140,000 francs paid by the shareholders. The founding meeting was held on 20 July 1908. An initial auction of the confiscated buildings had taken place on 7 April 1908; but the price of 250,000 francs for the property of the Faubourg Ceres appeared excessive to the Alumni Committee, and they declined the purchase. No other purchaser appeared and on 21 July 1908 the second auction found the city of Reims outbidding everyone; the building of the Faubourg Ceres was awarded to the city for 253,000 francs. The Company could only buy the furniture.

=== Saint-Joseph School, 37 Rue de Venise (1908–2001) ===
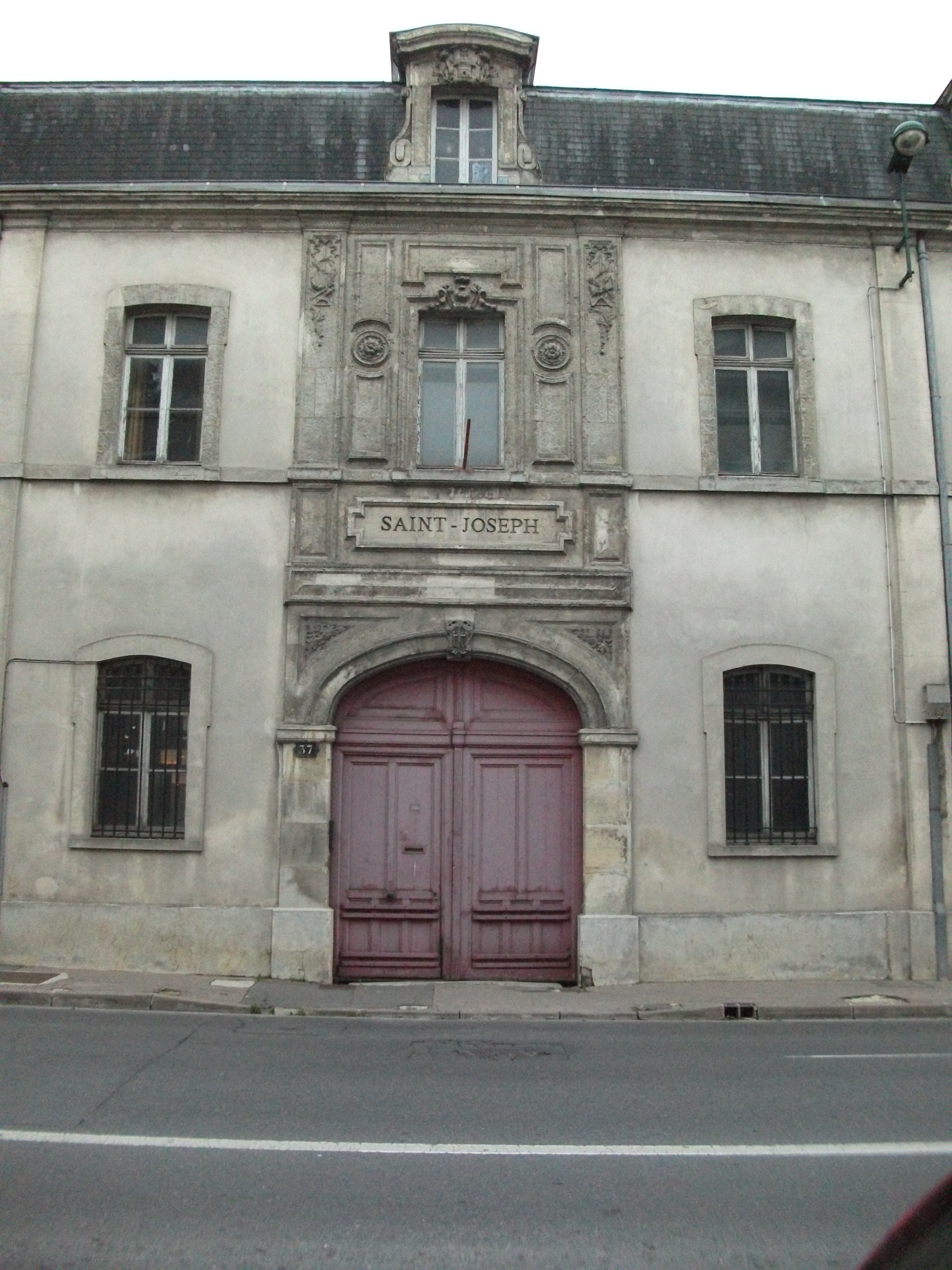
Entrance of Saint-Joseph de Reims building at 37 Rue de Venise, in 2010

==== Before the First World War (1908–1914) ====
Not having been able to retrieve the building from the Faubourg Ceres, decisions had to be taken to ensure the opening of the College in October. The former boarding school of the Brothers in the Rue de Venise, on which Crédit Foncier had a mortgage, had been vacant since 1904. Negotiations were begun in 1907 with Crédit Foncier and, with the approval of the Superior General of the Brothers, a lease was signed on 27 August 1908. Renovations progressed quickly and the school opened on time at 37 Rue de Venise on 8 October 1908.

Mr. Gindre was charged with the direction of the College. The teaching staff consisted of priests, ecclesiastics, and laymen, many of whom had already taught for several years at the Collège Faubourg Ceres.

The College continued, going from 165 pupils in 1908 to 275 pupils in 1913. In 1913 the Board of Directors, to ensure stability for the College and fearing use the building as barracks under the three-year military law, proposed to the shareholders the purchase of the building at Crédit Foncier. As with the lease, an approach was made to the Superior General of the Brothers, who gave his consent. An increase in the capital of the Society was covered by the alumni and friends of the College, and on 19 June 1913 the purchase was made.

==== During the First World War (1914–1918) ====
The mobilization of almost all professors and supervisors and, from September 1914, the bombing of the city interrupted the schooling. The buildings sheltered refugees from Belgium and Northern France. The war brought bombardments that severely damaged the buildings.

==== Between the two wars (1919–1939) ====
In spite of damage, the buildings survived the war. Fr. Cotteau de Simencourt, Superior of the College, and members of the Board of Directors requested to be allowed a return to Reims and reopen the school there. This was declined by the Superior General. Repairs were carried out to ensure the reopening in October 1919.

After that, the works continued with the chapel restored in 1920 and the completion of the kitchen, refectory and dormitories.

In 1924, the house located at 27 Rue de Venise was bought. In May 1924 the blessing of the commemorative marble plaques for 245 teachers and ex-pupils who died in the Great War took place.

In January 1929, the newsletter Le Sourire de Reims was created. The number of pupils rose to 518 in 1938.

==== During the Second World War (1939–1945) ====
The mobilization of September 1939 and the new World War were the next serious disturbance in the life of the College: Father Prefect, the bursar, and most of the masters were immediately mobilized. On September 9, seven-eighths of the College was requisitioned for overflow from St. Joseph Hospital.

The year 1942 marked an important turning point in the College's history. In the previous years there had been a question of a renewal of the school structure, which no longer imposed the same regulations on students in the upper and lower classes. In October 1942 the students were organised in 12-person "teams". This meant less supervision and more personal responsibility.

In 1944-1945, with no heating in the building on the Rue des Capucins, the classes were moved to the central building.

==== From the Liberation to the Centenary (1945–1974) ====
The development of the College was constant and gradual, from 576 in 1947 to 948 in 1974, necessitating an extension of the institution from the viewpoint of land and location. Nearby properties were purchased between 1953 and 1969, on Venice, Moulins, Capucins, l'Equerre, and Paul-Adam streets. Important construction was undertaken, in particular the First Division building and a large gymnasium.

Due to the law of 8 July 1969, the Société Immobilière of the College decided to become an Association under the 1901 Act. cited at the Extraordinary General Meeting of 6 December 1972, under the name of "Association Rémoise Immobilière et d'Enseignement Secondaire", with Jean Harmel as its Chairman.

== Notable alumni ==
- Émile Dewoitine (1892-1979), aircraft manufacturer, student from 1900 to 1905, member of the 30th class (1909)
- Benoît Duquesne (1957-2014), journalist class of 1975
- Pierre Gemayel (1972-2006), Lebanese politician, class of 1990
- Bernard Heidsieck (1928-2014), poet, class of 1948
- Jean-Louis Schneiter (1933-2016), deputy mayor of Rheims, class of 1950
- Bernard Stasi (1930-2011), politician, mayor of Épernay, class of 1947

== See also ==
- Catholic Church in France
- Education in France
- List of Jesuit schools
