= Jean-François Landriot =

French bishop

- Archbishop of Reims
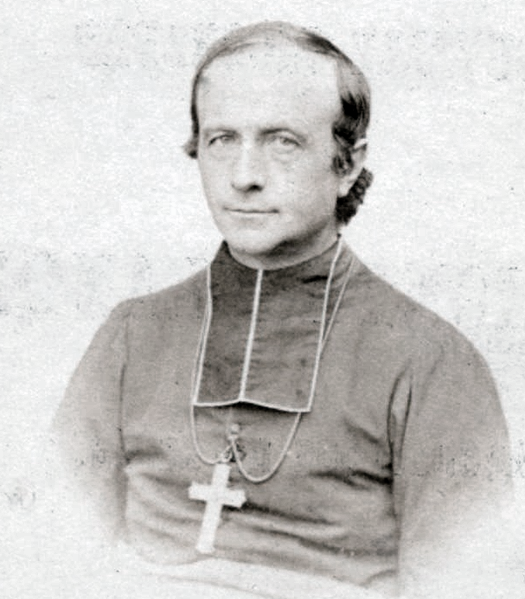
- Jean-François Landriot, circa 1867
- Church: Catholic Church
- Archdiocese: Archdiocese of Reims
- In office: 27 March 1867 – 8 June 1874
- Predecessor: Thomas-Marie-Joseph Gousset
- Successor: Benoît-Marie Langénieux
- Previous post: Bishop of La Rochelle and Saintes (1856-1867)

Orders
- Ordination: 25 May 1839
- Consecration: 20 July 1856 by Louis Jacques Maurice de Bonald

Personal details
- Born: Jean-Baptiste François Anne Thomas Landriot; 9 January 1816 Couches, Saône-et-Loire, Kingdom of France
- Died: 8 June 1874 (aged 58) Reims, Marne, French Republic

Styles of Jean-François-Anne Landriot
- Reference style: The Most Reverend
- Spoken style: Your Excellency
- Religious style: Monsignor
- Posthumous style: none

Jean-François Anne Landriot (born in Couches, 27 March 1816; died at Reims, 8 June 1874) was a French bishop, Ordained in 1839 from the seminary of Autun, he became, after a few years spent at the cathedral, successively superior of the seminary, 1842; vicar-general 1850; Bishop of La Rochelle, 1856, and Archbishop of Reims, 1867.

== Life ==
During his ten years at La Rochelle, Landriot restored the cathedral, organized the Propagation of the Faith and the Peter's-pence collections, and won a reputation as a pulpit orator. At Reims, besides preaching many Advent and Lenten stations, he raised a large subscription for the pontifical army, established several educational institutions, founded an asylum for the aged, and entrusted St. Walfroy to the Priests of the Mission.

As a member of the First Vatican Council, he deemed inopportune the definition of papal infallibility, but, once decreed, he adhered to its promulgation and wrote to his diocesans urging them to accept it. Lacroix ("Mgr. Landriot pendant l'occupation allemande", Reims, 1898) shows Landriot's influence in allaying the measure of rigor resorted to by the victorious Germans during their occupation of Reims in 1870. Landriot opposed Jean-Joseph Gaume and Louis Veuillot, who advocated for removing classic works from pagan authors from the curriculum.

== Works ==
An eloquent preacher, he was also an ascetic writer of note. His works, all published in Paris, include:

- "(Euvres de Mgr. Landriot" (7 vols., Paris, 1864–74), a collection of pastoral writings
- "Recherches historiques sur les écoles littéraires du Christianisme" (1851);
- "Examen critique des lettres de l'Abbé Gaume sur le paganisme dans l'éducation" (1852);
- "La femme forte" (1862);
- "La femme pieuse" (1863);
- "La prière chrétienne" (1863);
- "Le Christ et la tradition" (1865);
- "Les béatitudes évangéliques" (1865);
- "Le Symbolisme" (1866);
- "L'Eucharistie" (1866);
- "La Sainte Communion" (1872);
- "L'Autorité et la liberté" (1872);
- "L'esprit chrétien dans l'enseignement" (1873);
- "Instructions sur l'oraison dominicale" (1873);
- "L'Esprit Saint" (1879), etc.

Catholic Church titles
Preceded by Thomas-Marie-Joseph Gousset	Archbishop of Reims; 1867-1874	Succeeded by Benoit-Marie Langénieux
