= Louis-Antoine Caraccioli =

French writer, poet, historian and biographer

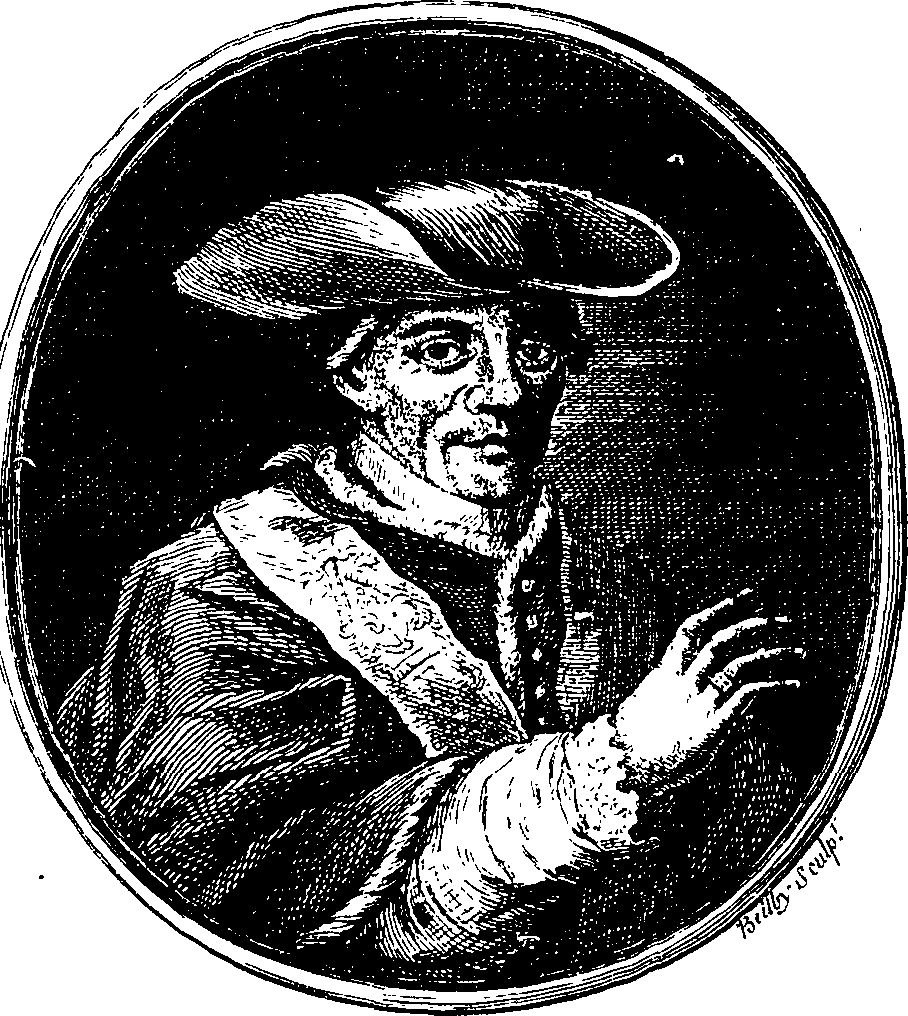
Marquis Louis-Antoine Caraccioli

Marquis Louis-Antoine Caraccioli (6 November 1719 – 29 May 1803) was a prolific French writer, poet, historian, and biographer long considered an "enemy of Philosophy" because of his extensive writings as a religious apologist.

== Life ==
Caraccioli was born in Paris to a noble family of Neapolitan origin, and held the title of Marquis. He studied in Mans and travelled in Italy, Germany and Poland and returned to Paris around 1768.

Caraccioli started his literary career during his travels in Italy. He wrote prolifically on a broad range of subjects. Caraccioli survived the French Revolution, despite his close ties to French aristocracy during the reigns of Louis XV and Louis XVI, but was left financially ruined. In 1795, he was awarded a 2000 franc pension by the National Convention. He died poor in Paris, in 1803, leaving, it is said, only eighty francs behind him.

His work was not ranked highly in his time; one of the old French biographical dictionaries, Nouvelle biographie générale, describes him as un littérateur (a maker of literature) rather than un écrivain (a writer). He is especially interesting to eighteenth-century scholars of manners, Pope Clement XIV and ultramontanism, among other subjects. Caraccioli is best known among book collectors for his color-printed books – Le livre de quatre couleurs (1757) and Le livre à la mode (1759) – as well as La jouissance de soi-même (1759), Liège de Le véritable mentor (1759), Le langage de la raison (1763), De la gaieté (1767), L’agriculture simplifiée (1769), Le Voyage de la Raison en Europe (1772), and Lettres intéressantes du pape Clément XIV (1776), many of which went through numerous editions in Europe and the United States and have been translated into several languages.

Lettres intéressantes du pape Clément XIV, which are considered by many to be forgeries, initially misled many Europeans about the life of the then recently deceased Pope.

One of his most studied and collected books, Les adieux de la Maréchale de *** à ses enfants (1769) (trans. Advice from a Lady of Quality to her Children, in the Last Stage of a Lingering Illness, In a Series of Evening-Conferences on the Most Interesting Subjects) was written in a series of "conferences" or meetings, which substitute for chapters or the more common use of letters. Unlike most courtesy books, Caraccioli's has the semblance of a plot and reads somewhat like a novel, which ends with the death of the main character. Caraccioli's work evolved a great deal over the half-century in which it was produced, and gradually reflected many modern values. Today many of his books are collected by various libraries throughout Europe and America, especially the Bibliothèque nationale de France and the William Andrews Clark Memorial Library at UCLA.

== Major works ==
- Caractère de l'amitié
- Conversation avec soi-même
- Jouissance de soi-même
- De la Grandeur d'âme
- Tableau de la mort
- De la gaieté
- Les adieux de la Maréchale de *** à ses enfants
- Langage de la raison
- Langage de la religion
- Religion de l'honnête homme
- Le Chrétien du temps
- Diogène à Paris
- Le Livre à la mode
- Vraie manière d'élever les princes
- Dictionnaire pittoresque et sententieux
- Vie de Clément XIV, translated to English as "Life of Pope Clement XIV" in 1776 by Charles Cordell
- Lettres intéressantes du pape Clément XIV, translated to English as "Letters of Pope Clement XIV" in 1777 by Charles Cordell
- Voyage de la raison en Europe
