= La Défense religieuse et sociale =

La Défense sociale et religieuse
- Type: Opinion journalism
- Founded: May 16, 1876
- Ceased publication: 1887
- Language: French
- Country: France

La Défense sociale et religieuse was a Catholic French newspaper, founded in May 1876 under the patronage of Bishop Dupanloup and discontinued in 1887.

La Défense opposed the anticlericalism of the republican elites of the Third Republic but adopted the moderate stance of its founder and thus was classified among moderate Catholic newspapers.

== History ==
=== Origins ===
After the 1876 legislative elections and the defeat of the Moral Order, the Jules Simon government came to power with a program aimed at reducing the influence of the Catholic Church. With the anticlerical projects of the government becoming apparent, the Bishop of Orléans revived his idea of founding a newspaper. The first issue was published on 16 May 1876, two weeks after Patrice de Mac Mahon's visit to the Orléans Cathedral, during which Bishop Dupanloup delivered the following address: "May God grant you the superior insights which, in times of peril, make a man one of those strong souls through whom, as Scripture says, God is pleased to save His people." Financial support for the newspaper's launch was provided by the Archbishop of Tours, as well as the bishops of Perpignan, Saint-Flour, La Rochelle, Meaux, Pamiers, Nîmes, Valence, Clermont, Nancy, Verdun, Saint-Brieuc, and Autun.

La Défense was initially directed by François Bouvier d'Yvoire, and from 1879 by Joseph Denais. Denais, who had contributed to the newspaper's creation in May 1876, wrote under the pseudonym "J. Hairdet." Jules Auffray served as editor-in-chief from 1887 to 1888.

In the following months, Bishop Dupanloup published a series of texts from his 1871 retreat at his estate in La Combe, written after his election to the National Assembly. These "Studies on Social Wounds," originally intended as part of a larger book, contained a sociological analysis of the causes of the Franco-Prussian War's defeat. He linked the rise of irreligion to the "demoralization of the nation," expressing concern about increasing crime and the proliferation of taverns. He attributed the moral degradation of the working classes to politicians and literary figures who had undermined social order, criticizing figures such as Victor Hugo, Eugène Sue, and George Sand.

Opposing the new republican majority, La Défense appealed to President Patrice de MacMahon to resist, contributing to the crisis of 16 May 1877.

The growing antagonism between Catholics and successive governments from the Republican Left radicalized debates, favoring more intransigent Catholic newspapers such as L'Univers, leading to the closure of La Défense sociale et religieuse in 1887.

== Notes and references ==
=== Bibliography ===
- Jacques Gadille (1967). La pensée et l'action politiques des évêques français au début de la IIIe République (1870-1883). Hachette.
