= Charles Cordell =

English Roman Catholic priest

Charles Cordell (b. 5 October 1720; d. at Newcastle-on-Tyne, 26 January 1791) was an English Roman Catholic priest.

== Life ==
He was the son of Charles Cordell and Hannah Darrell, of the Cordell family of Scotney Castle and Calehill, Kent. He was educated first at "Dame Alice's School", Fernyhalgh, afterwards at Douai College, where, in 1739, he began his course of philosophy.

Having been ordained priest, he left the college 10 June 1748, for England, where he served the mission at Arundel (1748–55), Rounday, in Yorkshire, the Isle of Man, and finally Newcastle upon Tyne (1765–91). In 1778 the presidency of the English college at Saint-Omer was offered to him, but he would not accept it.

Cordell was known as a scholarly, book-loving man and preacher. Politically, he remained a staunch Jacobite.

== Works ==
He published many translations and one original pamphlet, "A Letter to the Author of a Book called 'A Candid and Impartial Sketch of the Life and Government of Pope Clement XIV'" (1785). The translations include

- "The Divine Office for the Use of the Laity" (4 vols., Sheffield, 1763; 2d ed., 2 vols., Newcastle, 1780);
- Bergier's "Deism Self-refuted" (1775);
- Caraccioli's "Life of Pope Clement XIV" (1776); Letters of Pope Clement XIV (2 vols., 1777);
- Fronsletin's "Travels of Reason" (1781);
- Fleury's "Manners of the Christians" (1786) and "Manners of the Israelites" (1786);
- "Larger Historical Catechism" (1786); and
- "Short Historical Catechism" (1786).
