= Louis Veuillot =

French journalist and author (1813–1883)

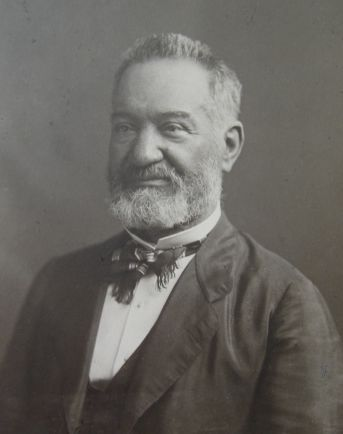
- Portrait by Nadar, 1873
- Born: 11 October 1813; Boynes, Loiret Department, France
- Died: 7 April 1883 (aged 69); Paris, France
- Resting place: Montparnasse Cemetery
- Occupation: Journalist
- Spouse: Mathilde
- Children: Marie; Agnès
- Relatives: Eugène Veuillot (brother); François Veuillot (brother)

Louis Veuillot (French: [lwi vœjo]; 11 October 1813 – 7 March 1883) was a French journalist and writer who helped to popularize ultramontanism (a philosophy favoring Papal supremacy).

== Career overview ==
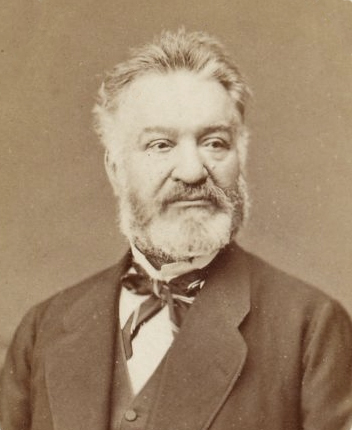
1870

Veuillot was born of humble parents in Boynes (Loiret). When he was five years of age, his parents relocated to Paris. With little education, he gained employment in a lawyer's office, and was sent in 1830 to serve with a newspaper of Rouen, and afterwards to Périgueux. Initially, Veuillot supported the July Monarchy of Louis Phillippe criticizing both Republicans and supporters of the deposed Bourbon Dynasty.

He returned to Paris in 1837, and a year later visited Rome during Holy Week. There he embraced ultramontane sentiments, and became an ardent champion of Catholicism. The results of his conversion were published in Pélerinages en Suisse (1839), Rome et Lorette (1841) and other publications. Veuillot's embrace of Ultramontanism led to his violent rejection of Bourgeois society and norms. He had little regard for theological nuance and held fast to the overall philosophies of Joseph de Maistre and Louis de Bonald, the original Catholic counter-revolutionary thinkers. Veuillot viewed all issues through the prism of their relationship to the Church and thought any disruption of the faith was a catastrophe. For this reason, he expressed surprise when he learned that his friend Joseph-Théophile Foisset was working on a new edition of Blaise Pascal since he was a Jansenist.

In 1840, Veuillot joined the staff of the newspaper Univers Religieux, a journal created in 1833 by Abbé Migne, and soon helped make it the leading organ of ultramontane propaganda as L'Univers. His methods of journalism, which made great use of irony and ad hominem criticism, had already provoked more than one duel, and he was imprisoned for a brief time for his polemics against the University of Paris. In 1848, he became editor of the newspaper, which was suppressed in 1860, but revived in 1867, when Veuillot resumed his ultramontane propaganda, causing a second suppression of his journal in 1874. Veuillot then occupied himself by writing polemical pamphlets against liberal Catholics, the Second French Empire and the Italian government. His services to the papal see were recognized by Pope Pius IX, on whom he wrote (1878) a monograph. Matthew Arnold said of him:

M. Louis Veuillot is a polemic worthy of the golden age of polemics. He is singly devoted to ultramontanism; he lives on a small fixed salary from the proprietors of the Univers; he is a man of the purest and simplest domestic life; he is poor, and has a large family, but he has refused all offers of place and salary from the government, and maintains his entire independence.

And Orestes Brownson wrote:

[Veuillot] manifests the temper and breeding of a fanatic, and seems to act on the principle that whoever differs on any important point in history, politics, or philosophy, from himself, must needs be a bad Catholic, or no Catholic at all. We question not his sincerity, we question not his personal piety; but we do question his qualification to be a Catholic leader. His mind is too narrow and one-sided for that, and his leadership, with the best intentions on his part, is fitted only to bring about the very results he most deprecates. Notwithstanding his hostility to those who regret the loss of parliamentary freedom, and his devotion to Imperialism, he has not been able to save his journal from an avertissement; and it would seem that, after having aided in erecting an Absolute government for his country, and in breaking down all the safeguards established by constitutionalism to freedom of thought, freedom of speech, and public discussion, the police have had the cruelty to take him at his word, and give him a taste of the despotism he has been willing to fasten upon others.

Some of his papers were collected in Mélanges Religieux, Historiques et Littéraires (12 vols., 1857–1875), and his Correspondance (7 vols., 1883–85) has great political interest. His younger brother, Eugène Veuillot, published (1901–1904) a comprehensive and valuable life, Louis Veuillot.

After the First Vatican Council, Veuillot's influence began to wane. In 1879, Pope Pius IX released a letter praising him, but also regretting his "bitter zeal" in advocating his views. Among the lower clergy Veuillot retained influence. Politically he returned to advocating the restorations of the Bourbon Monarchy under Henri, Count of Chambord.

== Antisemitism ==
Veuillot was a virulent antisemite. As early as the 1840s, he wrote articles in L'Univers defaming Jews, portraying them as alien vagabonds, accusing them of blood libel, and asserting that the Talmud commanded Jews to hate all Christians. He contemptuously dismissed Jews who criticized him as "the deicide people", claiming they were a foreign element which plotted to control all of French society. Veuillot's hatred intensified during the Mortara case to the point where it put him at odds with Napoleon III whom he had previously supported, causing the latter to temporarily suppress the journal. Veuillot's two-pronged assault on the Jews and liberalism would influence the antisemitism of Édouard Drumont, who worked for L'Univers in his youth. Drumont, who in his turn was an employer of Charles Maurras, was admired by Karl Lueger, whom Adolf Hitler acknowledged as an influence in Mein Kampf.

== Legacy ==
A misattributed quote to Veuillot, "When I am weaker than you, I ask you for freedom because that is according to your principles; when I am stronger than you, I take away your freedom because that is according to my principles", is quoted in Frank Herbert's Children of Dune.

== Works ==
- Correspondance, Tome II, Tome III, Tome IV, Tome V, Tome VII, Société Générale de Librairie Catholique, 1885.
- Rome et Lorette, J. Casterman, 1841.
- De l'Action des Laiques dans la Question Religieuse, Au Bureau de L'Univers, 1843.
- Vie de Notre-Seigneur Jésus-Christ, Librairie Catholique de Périsse Frérés, 1864 [1st Pub. 1846].
- Les Libres-Penseurs, Jacques Lecoffre et Cie., 1850.
- La Légalité: Dialogue Philosophique, Plon Frères, 1852.
- Les Droits du Seigneur au Moyen Âge, L. Vivés, 1854.
- Le Parti Catholique, L. Vivés, 1856.
- Le Pape et la Diplomatie, Gaume Frères et J. Duprey, 1861.
- Waterloo, Gaume Frères et J. Duprey, 1861.
- Satires, Gaume Frérés et J. Duprey, 1863.
- Le Guêpier Italien, Victor Palmé, 1865.
- A Propos de la Guerre, Palmé, 1866.
- L'Illusion Libérale, Palmé, 1866.
- Les Odeurs de Paris, Palmé, 1867.
- Les Couleuvres, Victor Palmé, 1869.
- Corbin et d'Aubecourt, Victor Palmé, 1869.
- La Liberté du Concile, Victor Palmé, 1870.
- Paris Pendant les Deux Sièges, Victor Palmé, 1871.
- Le Parfum de Rome, Victor Palmé, 1871.
- Mélanges Religieux, Historiques et Littéraires, Tome II, Tome III, Tome IV, Tome V, Tome VI, L. Vivés, 1857–1875.
- Molière et Bourdaloue, Société Générale de Librairie Catholique, 1877.
- La Guerre et l'Homme de Guerre, Victor Palmé, 1878.
- Çá et Lá, Société Générale de Librairie Catholique, 1883.
- Historietes et Fantaisies, Société Générale de Librairie Catholique, 1883.
- Études sur Victor Hugo, Société Générale de Librairie Catholique, 1886.

=== Works in English translation ===
- In The Irish Monthly, Vol. 5, 1877.
  - "The Graves of a Breton Household," pp. 417–418.
  - "The Legend of the Red Lillies," pp. 756–757.
- The Life of Our Lord Jesus Christ. New York: Peter F. Collier, 1878.
- Stephanie. Dublin: M.H. Gill and Son, 1883.
- "The Essence of Giboyer (A Retort to 'Giboyer's Son')." In: The Universal Anthology, Vol. XXVII. London: The Clarke Company, Ltd., 1899.
- In Béla Menczer (Ed.), Catholic Political Thought, 1789–1848, University of Notre Dame Press, 1962.
  - "The True Freedom of Thought," pp. 196–205.
- The Liberal Illusion. Kansas City, Mo.: Angelus Press, 2005.

== Gallery ==
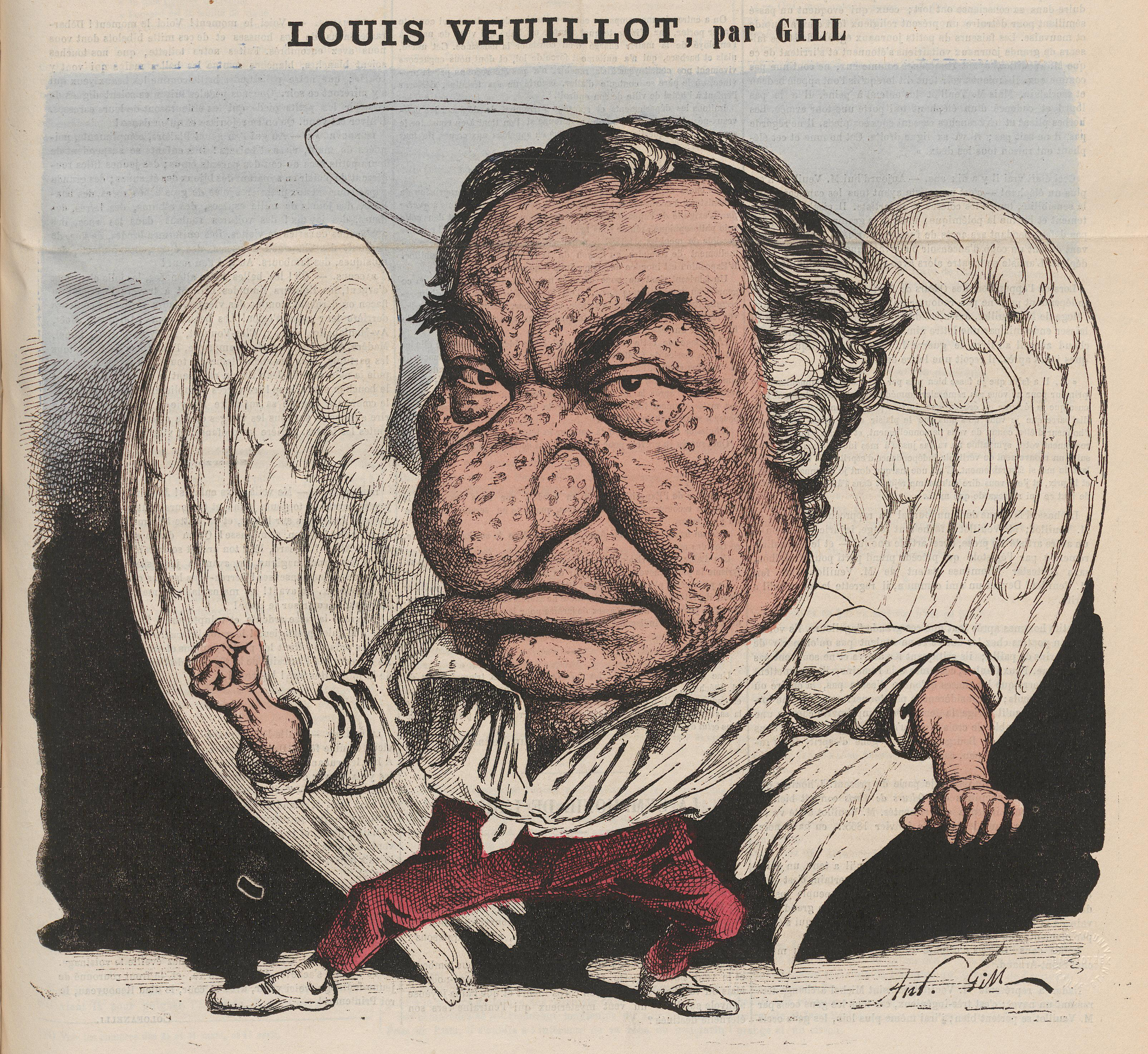
Caricature of Louis Veuillot, by André Gil, from La Lune, 21 April 1867.

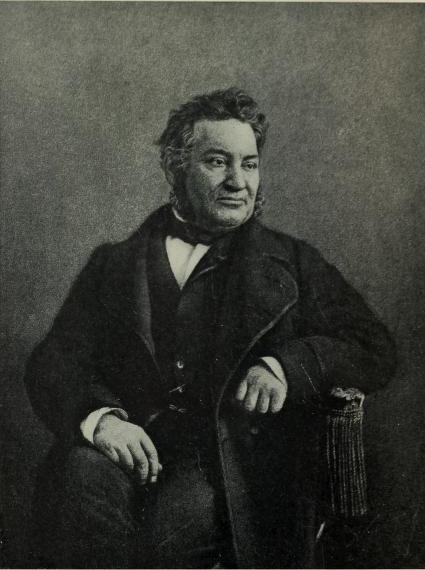
Portrait of Louis Veuillot, n.d.

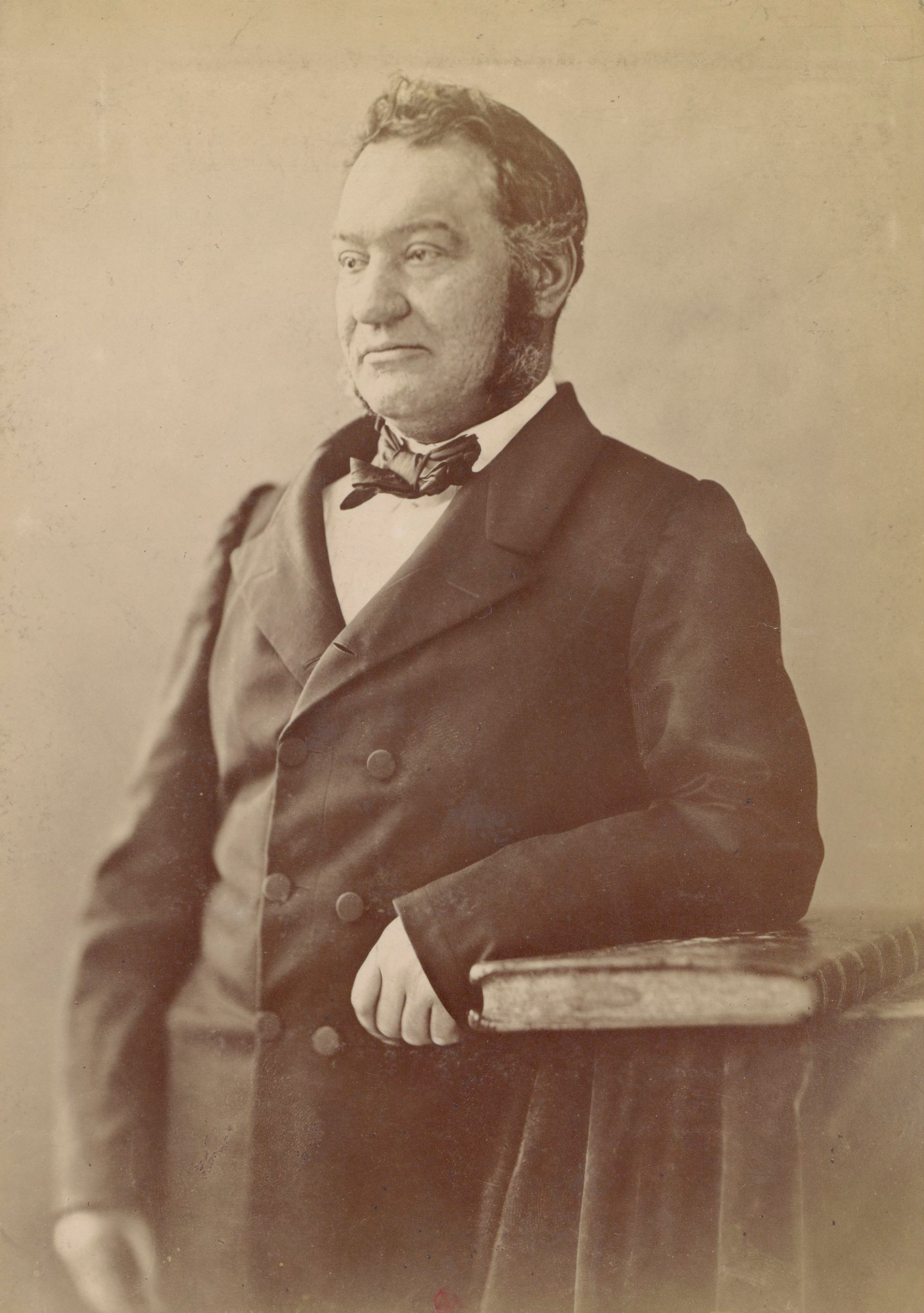
Picture by Nadar, 1850s.

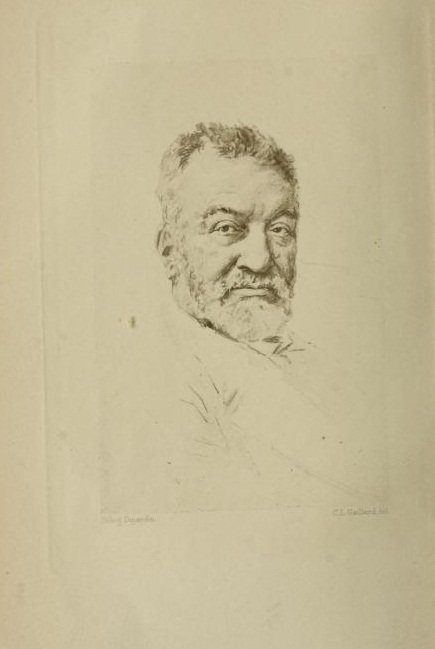
Portrait of Louis Veuillot, n.d.

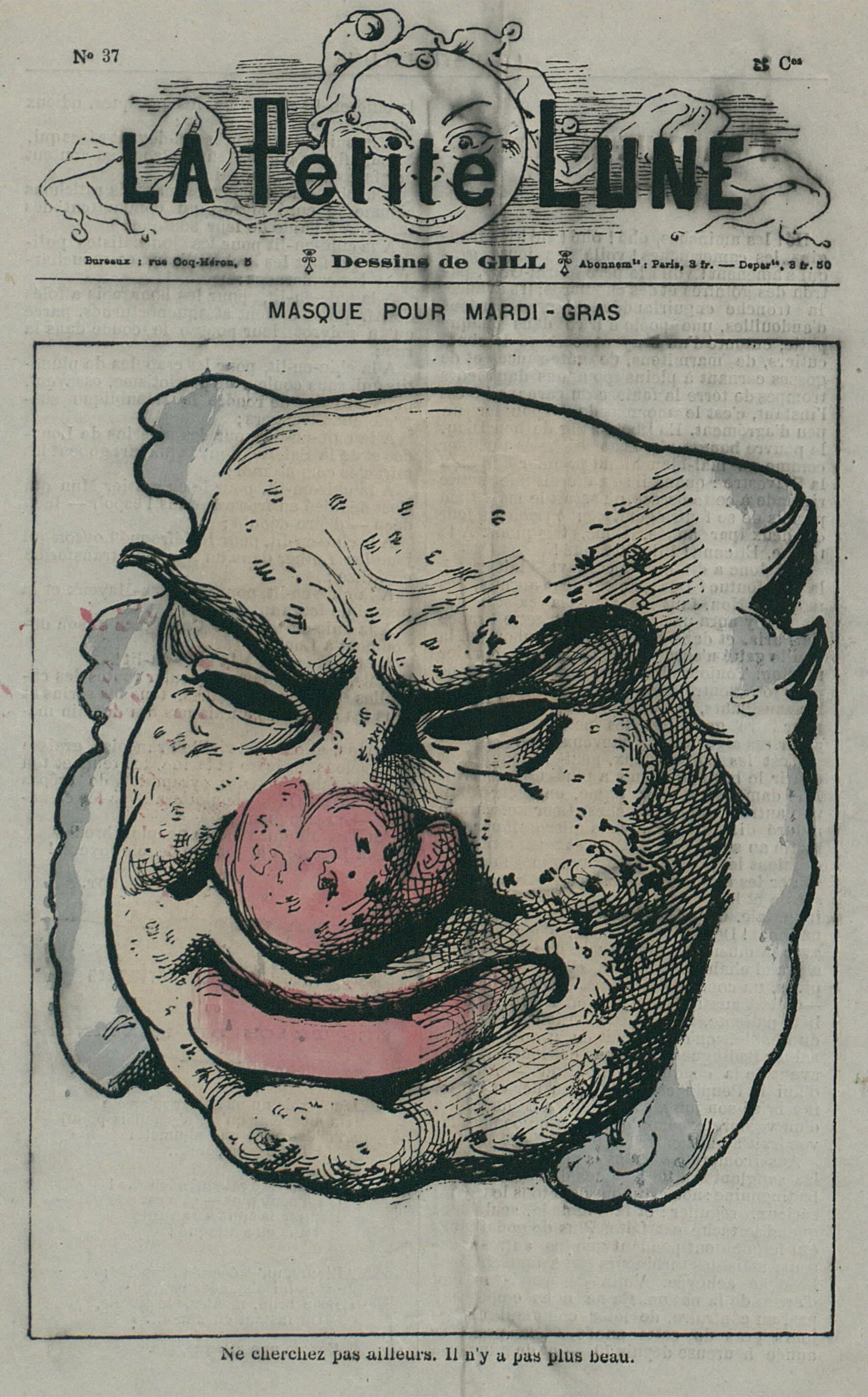
"Masque pour Mardi-Gras." Caricature of Louis Veuillot, La Petite Lune, No. 37, 1878–1879.

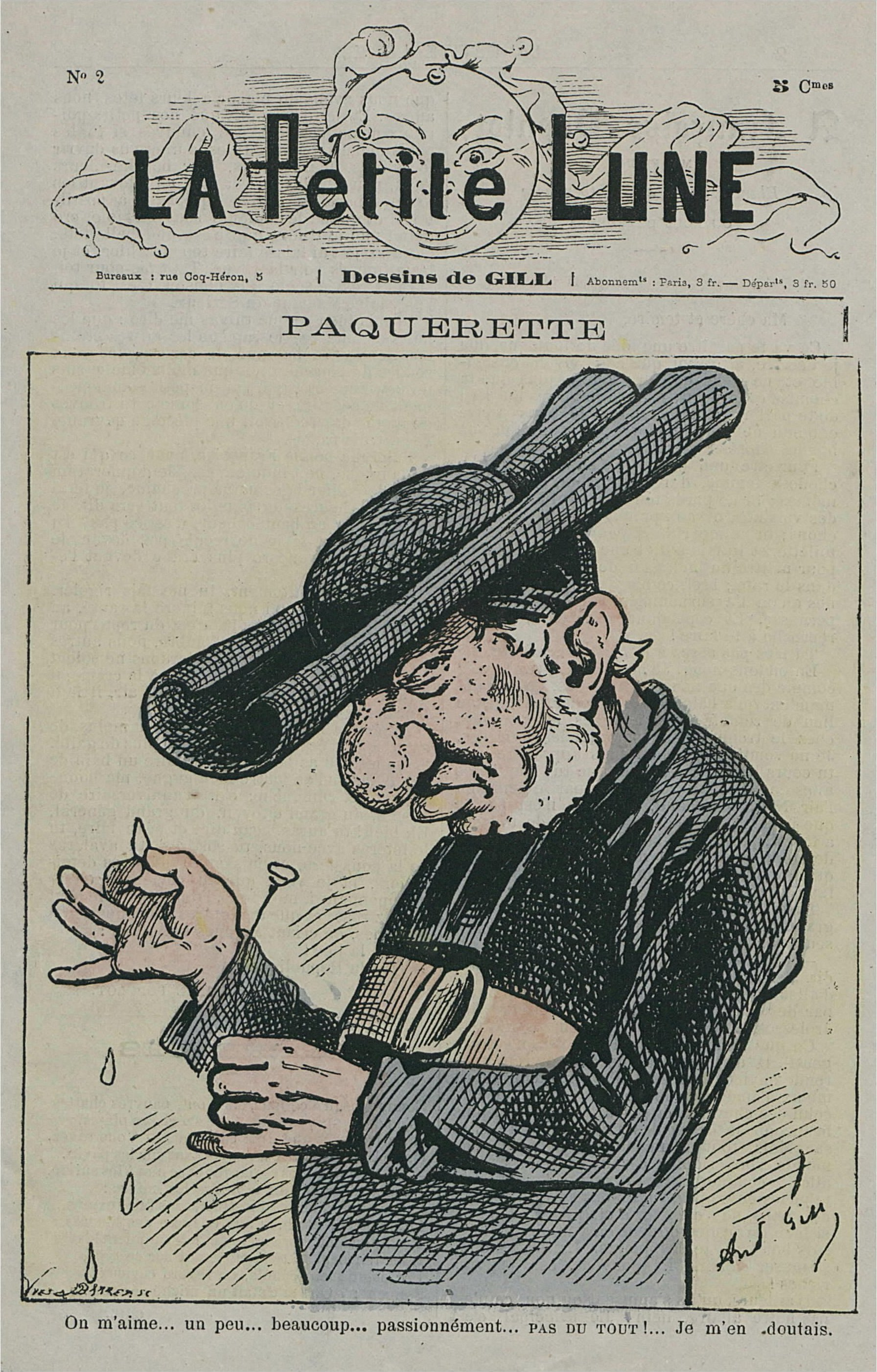
"Pâquerette." Caricature of Louis Veuillot, La Petite Lune, No. 2, 1878–1879.

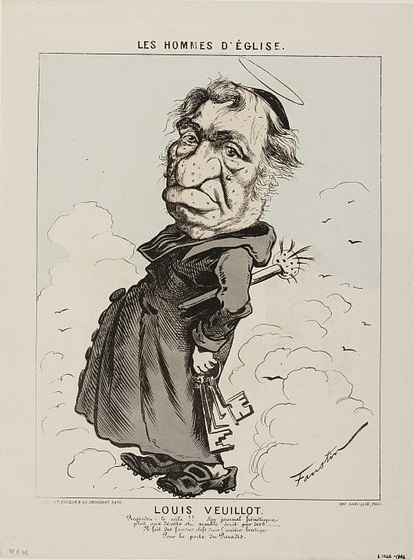
"Les Hommes D'Église." Caricature of Louis Veuillot, by Faustin Betbeder, 1870–1871.

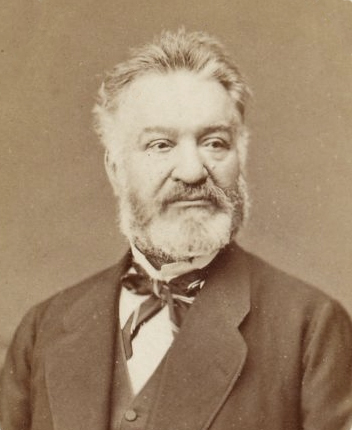
Picture of Louis Veuillot, During the 1870s.

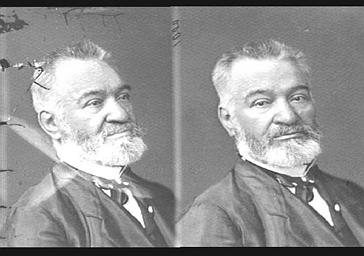
Pictures of Louis Veuillot, by Nadar, 1856.

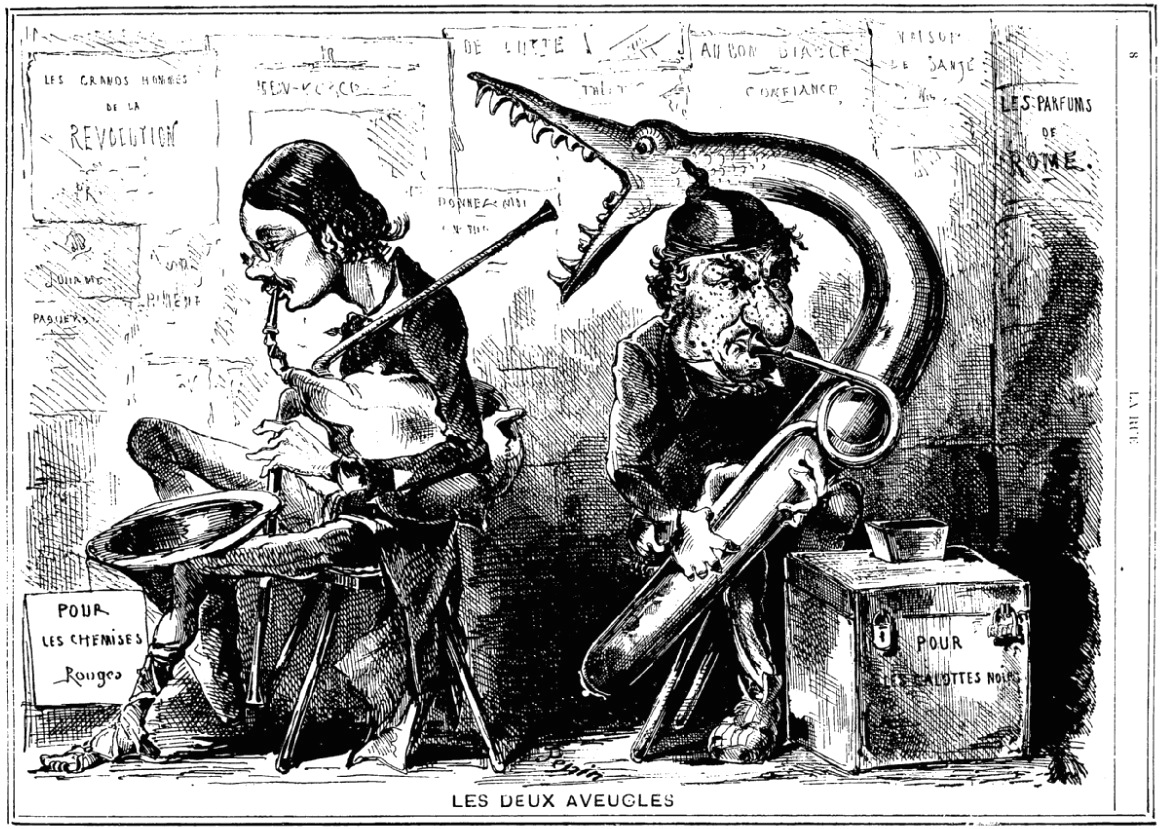
"Les Deux Aveugles," (Vermorel and Veuillot), by Claude Guillaumin, La Rue, 26 October 1867.

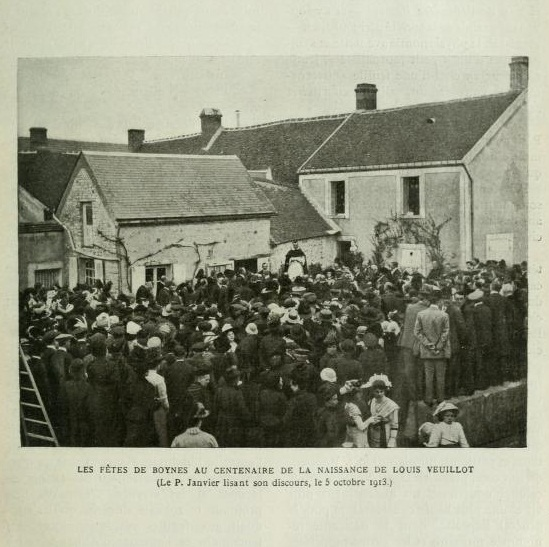
Centennial Celebration of the Birth of Louis Veuillot, 5 October 1913.

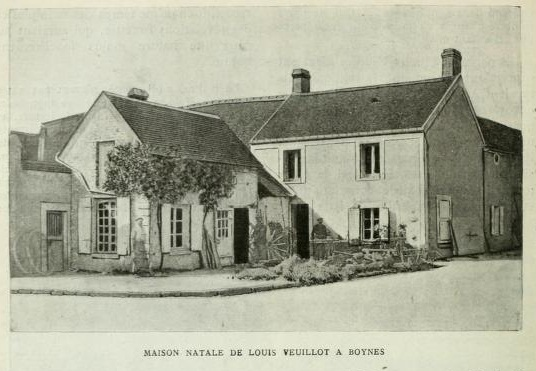
Louis Veuillot Birthplace, in Boynes, Loiret, n.d.

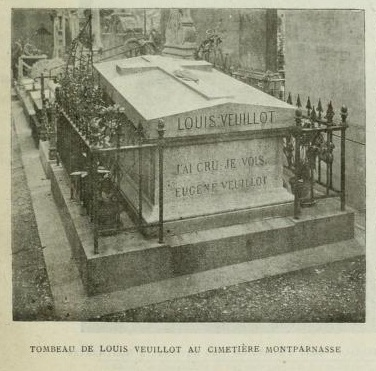
Veuillot's Tombstone, Montparnasse Cemetery, n.d.

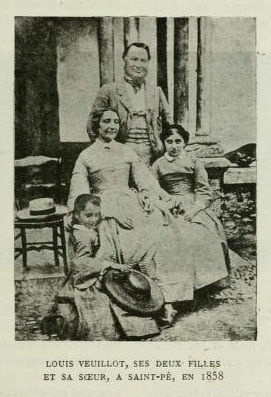
Veuillot, his two Daughters, Agnès and Marie, and his Sister, Élise, 1858.

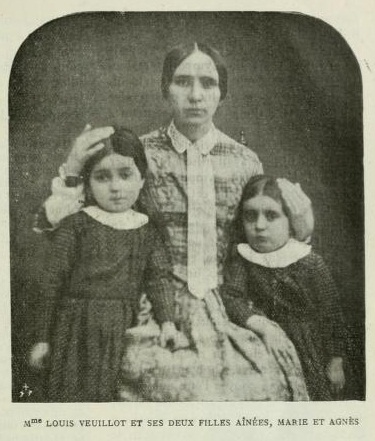
Wife and Daughters of Louis Veuillot, n.d.

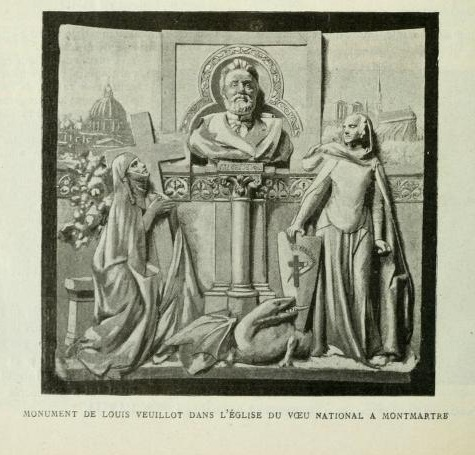
Monument in the Church of Voeu National, in Montmartre.

== See also ==
- Charles Forbes René de Montalembert
- Henri, Count of Chambord
- Our Lady of La Salette
- Catholic Church in France
