= Union Générale =

French Catholic bank

Union générale
- Company type: Privately held company
- Industry: Banking and Finance
- Founded: 1875
- Founder: Paul Eugène Bontoux
- Defunct: January 1, 1882

The General Union (Union générale) was a French Catholic bank founded in Lyon in 1875 by Catholic monarchists and then taken over in 1878 by Paul Eugène Bontoux. It went bankrupt in a resounding manner in 1882, during the stock market crash.

== History ==
In 1878, Paul Eugène Bontoux, former head of department of de Rothschild Frères, general counsel for Hautes-Alpes who had just been invalidated in the legislative elections of 1877 in Gap for vote fraud, former director of railway companies (the Staatsbahn (de) and the Südbahn) and who in 1874 successfully launched a loan on the public markets for lignite operations in Austria, took over the management of the General Union founded in 1875 in Lyon by a group of Catholic and monarchist bankers and who is in trouble.

The Bank was officially created on June 3, 1878. The initial capital was to be 25 million francs, an amount which was immediately increased to 50 million francs. The bank met with great success in Catholic and Legitimist circles and obtained the support of the Count of Chambord, pretender to the throne of France. The bank grew rapidly by multiplying redemptions and risky investments, particularly in the regions of Central and Danubian Europe. In particular, it financed and built the first railway in Serbia. It acquired insurance companies, created the Lyons Water and Lighting Company and financed operations in North Africa and Egypt with other banks while speculating on the stock market. In January 1882 the company was forced to suspend its payments and eventually collapse. On January 19, 4 billion francs is wasted, a considerable amount at that time. This was the first “big puff” in contemporary financial history.

In 1882, resulting from overcapitalization of securities (the Stock Exchange had more securities than it could receive), poor financial management (buyout by the company of its own shares, etc.) and a struggle between "bears" (notably, Rothschilds) and "bulls", mixing politics, religion and finance, the General Union collapsed. This resulted in the bankruptcy of many stockbrokers near the Lyon Stock Exchange and also had repercussions on the Paris Stock Exchange (Paris Bourse crash of 1882). In January 1882, Bontoux was arrested and spent several months in prison. Feder and Bontoux were sentenced to five years in prison. A small group of major financiers, including Moïse de Camondo, Louis Cahen d'Anvers, Rothschild and the Banque de Paris et des Pays-Bas, organized the rescue of the banks caught in the crisis, by setting up a special fund of 20 million francs.

The crisis of several years which followed mainly affected mines, metallurgy and the building industry, leading to a series of unemployment and violent social conflicts, including in 1884 "the great miners' strike", and in Decazeville. The crash of the Union Générale led to criticism of stock-trading (manoeuvres aimed at manipulating stock prices). It was regarded by his contemporaries as the result of a political struggle between the conservative and legitimist right (Bontoux had made this bank the bank for the conservatives: it notably had many clergymen among its shareholders) and the liberal left.

== See also ==
- List of banks in France
