= Fuans =

- Commune
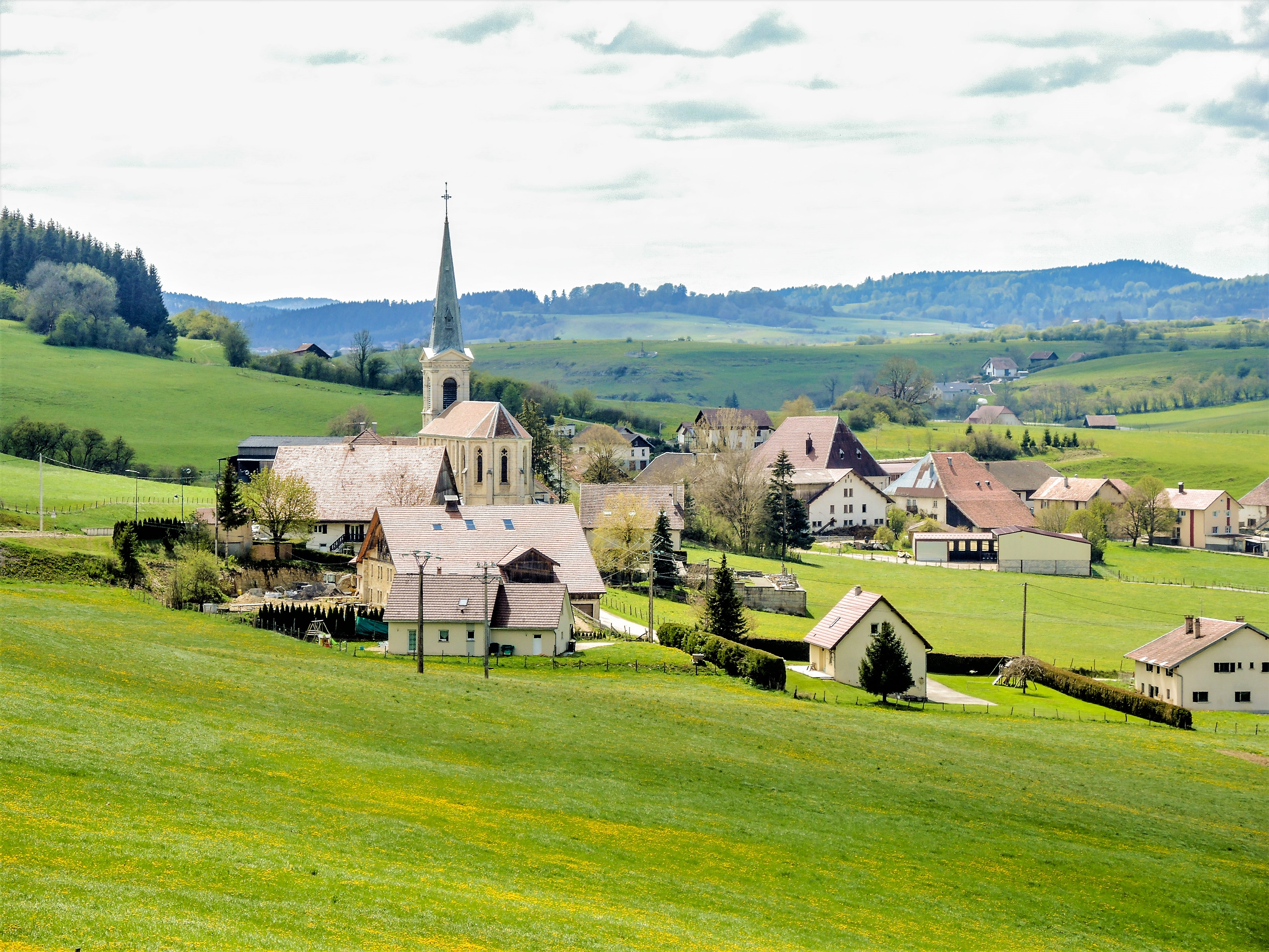
- The town hall in Fuans
- Location of Fuans
- Location within France Location within Bourgogne-Franche-Comté
- Coordinates: 47°07′51″N 6°34′20″E
- Country: France
- Region: Bourgogne-Franche-Comté
- Department: Doubs
- Arrondissement: Pontarlier
- Canton: Valdahon

Government
  - Mayor (2020–2026): Daniel Kovacic
- Area^{1}: 11.1 km^{2} (4.3 sq mi)
- Highest elevation: 1,023 m (3,356 ft)
- Lowest elevation: 688 m (2,257 ft)
- Population (2023): 473
  - Density: 42.6/km^{2} (110/sq mi)
- Time zone: UTC+01:00 (CET)
  - Summer (DST): UTC+02:00 (CEST)
- INSEE/Postal code: 25262 /25390
- ^{1} French Land Register data, which excludes lakes, ponds, glaciers > 1 km^{2} (0.386 sq mi or 247 acres) and river estuaries.

Fuans (French pronunciation: [fɥɑ̃]) is a commune in the Doubs department in the Bourgogne-Franche-Comté region in eastern France.

== Population ==
Historical population
Year	Pop.	±% p.a.
1968	273	—
1975	264	−0.48%
1982	267	+0.16%
1990	303	+1.59%
1999	336	+1.16%
2007	421	+2.86%
2012	491	+3.12%
2017	483	−0.33%
2023	473	−0.35%
Source: INSEE

== See also ==
- Communes of the Doubs department
