= Nicolas-Sylvestre Bergier =

French Catholic theologian (1718–1790

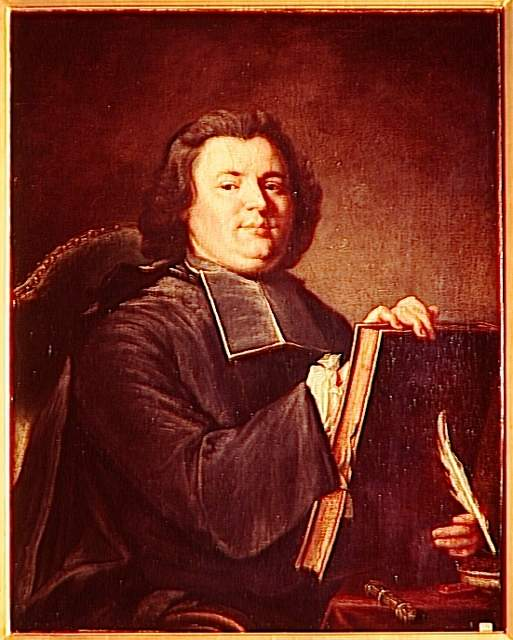
Portrait of Nicolas-Sylvestre Bergier. Painting from Joseph Aved. Réunion des musées nationaux Grand Palais.

Nicolas-Sylvestre Bergier (French: [bɛʁʒje]; 31 December 1718 – 9 April 1790) was a French Catholic theologian, known for his engagement with the atheist philosophes of eighteenth-century France.

== Life ==
Bergier was born at Darney in Lorraine. After a course of theology in the University of Besançon, he received the degree of doctor, was ordained priest, and went to Paris to finish his studies. Returning to Besançon in 1748, he was given charge of a parish and later became president of the college of the city, which had formerly been under the direction of the Jesuits. As a result of his bestselling polemic Deism Refuted By Itself (1765), Bergier was released from pastoral responsibilities by the French bishops in order to write full-time. In particular, his apologetics targeted the popular atheism of Jean-Jacques Rousseau and Baron d'Holbach, although - somewhat unusual for a polemical writer - he sought to understand his opponents' viewpoints. He was a critic of the philosophes, accusing them in particular of distorting the facts on social life in China and Confucianism. He, however, frequented Enlightenment salons and was a personal friend of Diderot.

In 1769 the Archbishop of Paris, Christophe de Beaumont, appointed him canon of the cathedral, and from then on Bergier resided at Paris. He died at Versailles.

== Works ==
The works of Bergier are in the fields of apologetics and theology, except for Les elements primitifs des langues (Besançon, 1764) and L'origine des dieux du paganisme (Paris, 1767).

Bergier agreed to correct certain articles of the Encyclopédie, but found himself obliged to write entirely original articles which then formed the Dictionnaire de théologie as a part of the Encyclopédie. This has been often edited, especially by Gousset in 8 vols. (Besançon, 1838) and Migne (Paris, 1850).

Other major works of Bergier include:

- Le Déisme refuté par lui-même (Paris, 1765; translated to English by Charles Cordell, 1775);
- La Certitude des preuves du christianisme (Paris, 1767, also published in Migne's Démonstrations évangéliques, XI);
- Réponses aux Conseils raisonnables de Voltaire (Paris, 1771, also in Migne, ibid.);
- Apologie de la religion chrétienne - against d'Holbach's Christianisme devoilé (Paris, 1769);
- Réfutation des principaux articles du dictionnaire philosophique;
- Examen du matérialisme (Paris, 1771);
- Traité historique et dogmatique de la vraie religion (Paris, 1780, and 8 vols. 8vo., 1820).

Some of his writings concerning divorce, the question of the mercy of God and the origin of evil, and one volume of sermons were published after his death.
