= Jacques Paul Migne =

French priest and scholar (1800–1875)

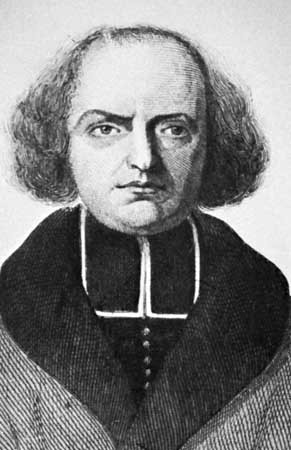
Jacques-Paul Migne, engraving by E. Tailland

Jacques Paul Migne (French: [miɲ]; Latin: Iacobus Paulus Migne; 25 October 1800 – 24 October 1875) was a French Catholic priest who published inexpensive and widely distributed editions of theological works, encyclopedias, and the texts of the Church Fathers, with the goal of providing a universal library for the Catholic priesthood.

The Patrologia Latina and the Patrologia Graeca (along with the Monumenta Germaniae Historica) are among the great 19th century contributions to the scholarship of patristics and the Middle Ages. Within the Roman Catholic Church, Migne's editions put many original texts for the first time into the hands of the priesthood.

== Biography ==
Migne was born in Saint-Flour, Cantal and studied theology at the University of Orléans. He was ordained in 1824 and placed in charge of the parish of Puiseaux, in the diocese of Orléans, where his uncompromisingly Catholic and royalist sympathies did not coincide with local patriotism and the new regime of the Citizen-King. In 1833, after falling out with his bishop over a pamphlet he had published, he went to Paris, and on 3 November started a journal, L'Univers religieux, which he intended to keep free of political influence. It quickly gained 1,800 subscribers and he edited it for three years. (It afterwards became his co-editor Louis Veuillot's ultramontane organ, L'Univers.) Migne was, until June 1856, owner of the daily Vérité (formerly the Journal des faits), which, being limited to reproducing other newspapers, described itself as the impartial echo of all opinions.

Migne believed in the power of the press and the value of information widely distributed. In 1836 he opened his great publishing house, the Ateliers catholiques, at Petit-Montrouge, in Paris's outlying 14th arrondissement. He published numerous religious works in rapid succession meant for lesser clergy at prices that ensured wide circulation, and bypassed the bookselling establishment with direct subscriptions. These works were reproduced from the best available texts, generally without requesting permission. His publishing house was complemented during the Second Empire by painter artists' workhalls for the decoration of churches: three of their main works, in the style of Eugène Delacroix, still remain in the choir of the church of Saint John the Baptist of Audresselles in Pas de Calais, France. The Ateliers also produced and sold a variety of religious items.

In time, the Ateliers catholiques became the largest privately held press in France. However, on the night of 12–13 February 1868, a devastating fire, which began in the printing plant, destroyed Migne's establishment. "Five hundred thousand plates, stacked in piles, melted in an instant; they are now enormous blocks on the most bizarre forms," reported Le Monde illustré. Despite his insurance contracts, Migne was only able to retrieve a pittance.

Shortly afterwards, Georges Darboy, Archbishop of Paris, forbade the continuance of the business and even suspended Migne from his priestly functions. The Franco-Prussian War of 1870 inflicted further losses. Then from the curia of Pope Pius IX came a decree condemning the use of Mass stipends to purchase books, which specifically called out Migne and his publications.

Migne died in Paris. He died without ever regaining his former success and his Imprimerie Catholique passed in 1876 into the hands of Garnier Frères.

== A complete edition of patrology ==
The best known of his publications are: Scripturae sacrae cursus completus ("complete course in sacred scripture") which assembled a wide repertory of commentaries on each of the books of the Bible, and Theologiae cursus, each of them in 28 vols, 1840–45; Collection des auteurs sacrés (100 vols., 1846–48); Encyclopédie théologique (171 vols., 1844–46).

However, the three series that have made his reputation were Patrologiae cursus completus, Latin series (Patrologia Latina) in 221 vols. (1844–55); Greek series (Patrologia Graeca), first published in Latin (85 vols., 1856–57); then published with Greek text and Latin translation (165 vols., 1857–58). Though scholars have always criticised them, these hastily edited, inexpensive, and widely distributed texts have only slowly been replaced during a century and a half with more critically edited modern editions. The cheap paper of the originals has made them fragile today, but the scope of the Patrologia still makes it unique when modern editions do not yet exist. It is a far more complete collection of Patristic and later literature than anything that has appeared subsequently. To create so much so quickly, Migne reprinted the best or latest earlier editions available to him. In the PG the Latin translations were often made in the renaissance before any Greek text had been printed, and so do not necessarily match the Greek text very accurately. The indexes themselves are useful for locating references in the patristic writings.

The collection is available through Google Books and archive.org.

== Summary of publications ==
Migne's Ateliers catholiques employed 5 steam-powered presses, and by 1854 some 596 workers. On average, it published a book every ten days for thirty years. In summary these were:

- Patrologia Latina, 217 volumes in 218 parts
- Patrologia Graeca, 161 volumes in 166 parts
- Greek Fathers in Latin, 81 volumes in 85 parts
- Scripturae sacrae cursus completus, 25 volumes
- Theologia cursus completus, 25 volumes
- Démonstration évangeliques des plus célèbres défenseurs du Christianisme, 18 volumes
- Orateurs sacrés in two series, 66 and 33 volumes
- Première encyclopédie théologique ou série de dictionnaires sur toutes les parties de la science religieuse, 50 volumes
- Nouvelle encyclopédie théologique, 53 volumes
- Troisième et dernière encylopédie ecclésiastique, 66 volumes
- Summa aurea de laudibus B. Mariae virginis, 13 volumes
