= Boynes =

- Commune
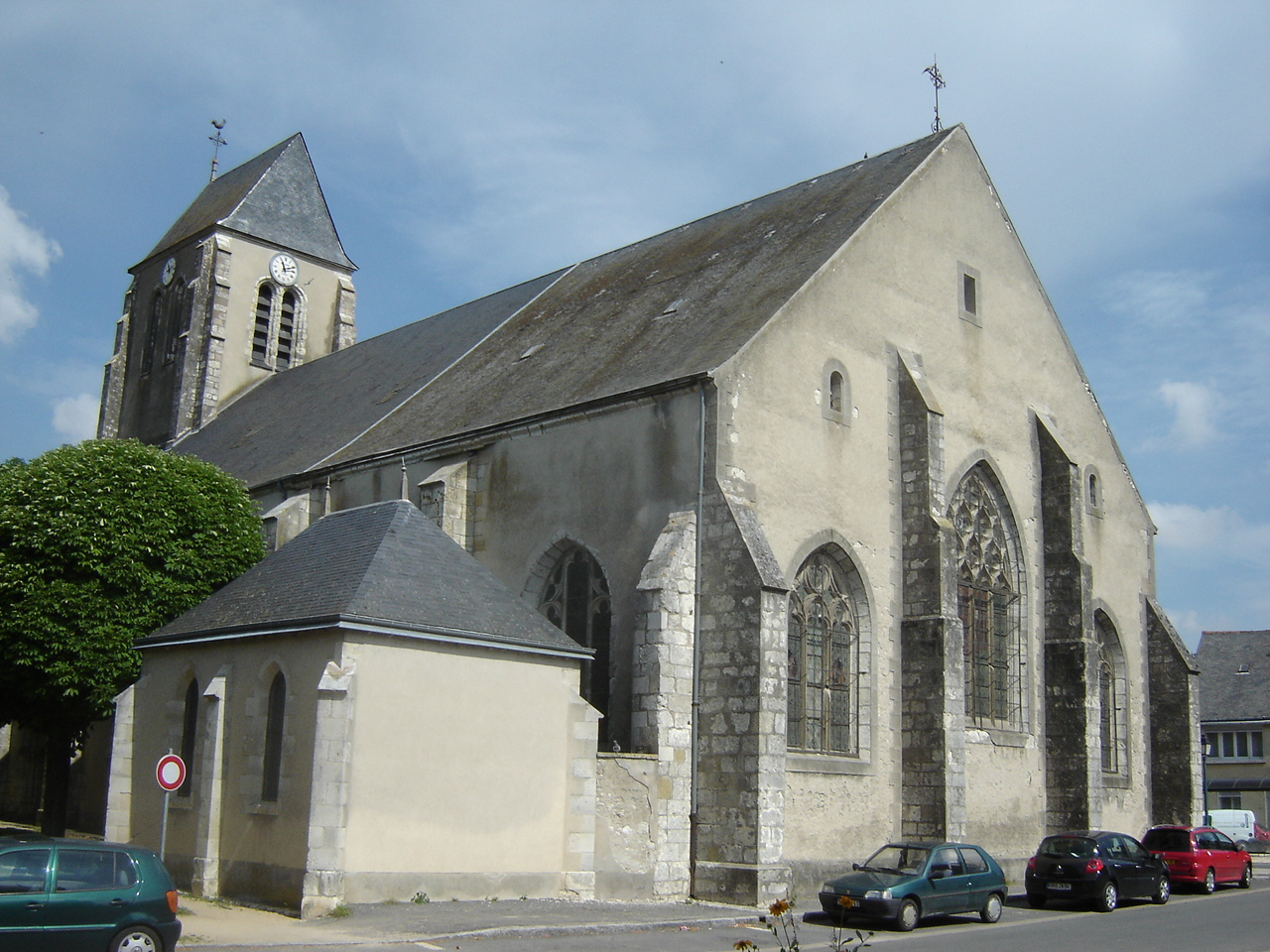
- The church in Boynes

- Coat of arms
- Location of Boynes
- Location within France Location within Centre-Val de Loire
- Coordinates: 48°07′15″N 2°21′39″E
- Country: France
- Region: Centre-Val de Loire
- Department: Loiret
- Arrondissement: Pithiviers
- Canton: Le Malesherbois
- Intercommunality: Pithiverais

Government
  - Mayor (2020–2026): Thierry Barjonet
- Area^{1}: 15.43 km^{2} (5.96 sq mi)
- Highest elevation: 123 m (404 ft)
- Lowest elevation: 105 m (344 ft)
- Population (2023): 1,289
  - Density: 83.54/km^{2} (216.4/sq mi)
- Time zone: UTC+01:00 (CET)
  - Summer (DST): UTC+02:00 (CEST)
- INSEE/Postal code: 45050 /45300
- ^{1} French Land Register data, which excludes lakes, ponds, glaciers > 1 km^{2} (0.386 sq mi or 247 acres) and river estuaries.

Boynes (French pronunciation: [bwan]) is a commune in the Loiret department in north-central France.

== Population ==
Historical population
Year	Pop.	±% p.a.
1968	971	—
1975	1,009	+0.55%
1982	963	−0.66%
1990	978	+0.19%
1999	1,014	+0.40%
2007	1,148	+1.56%
2012	1,300	+2.52%
2017	1,355	+0.83%
2023	1,289	−0.83%
Source: INSEE

== See also ==
- Communes of the Loiret department
