= Paris Bourse crash of 1882 =

1882 stock market crash in France

The Paris Bourse crash of 1882 was a stock market crash in France, and was the worst crisis in the French economy in the nineteenth century. The crash was triggered by the collapse of l'Union Générale in January. Around a quarter of the brokers on the bourse were on the brink of collapse. The closure of the exchange was prevented by a loan from the Banque de France which enabled sufficient liquidity to support settlement.

== Causes ==
The stock price of l’Union Générale rose from 500 francs a share in 1879 to over 3,000 francs at its peak. Investors saw the booming market for new securities and jumped into the forward market. Speculators also printed counterfeit money; they renewed their forward contracts in hopes for a continuous rise in prices.

As the market grew, so did the demand for cash, and interest rates began to rise to the point where lenders began demanding a premium. This situation foretold that a collapse would occur when investors would repay their loans, not wanting to pay this premium or to incur refinancing debt at high interest rates. This could mean the bank would lose its primary revenue source, with the resultant stock overvaluation and share price decline. These events are very similar to the events leading up to the American 1929 crash. As this happened, the price of l'Union Générale began to deteriorate. The bank failed to repay its debts and to honor its clients’ accounts, falsifying public reports to avoid the complete crash of its value and credit-worthiness. Between January 5, 1882 and January 14, 1882 the cash price of a share dropped from 3,040 to 2,800 francs.

== During ==
The crash led to a recession which lasted until the end of the decade. Immediately after the crash, the bank's founder attributed its downfall to conspiratorial aims of Jewish-German banks and Freemasons, intent on destroying banks which backed conservative, Catholic political agendas.

It is now generally accepted that there was no conspiracy to destroy the bank, but it remains unclear why the collapse of the bank was so devastating.

During the 1882 crash, 14 of 60 stock brokers appeared to be in imminent danger of failure and seven were completely bankrupt. The famous painter Paul Gauguin had been working as a stock broker until the crash; after that, he decided to dedicate himself to painting full-time.
