= Thomas-Marie-Joseph Gousset =

French cardinal and theologian

His Eminence Thomas-Marie-Joseph Gousset
- Archbishop of Reims
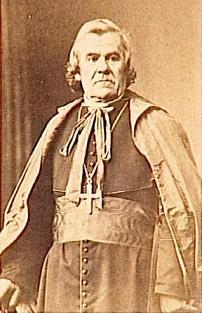
- Church: Roman Catholic Church
- Archdiocese: Reims
- See: Reims
- Appointed: 13 July 1840
- Term ended: 22 December 1866
- Predecessor: Jean-Baptist-Marie-Anne-Antoine de Latil
- Successor: Jean-Baptiste-François-Anne-Thomas Landriot
- Other post: Cardinal-Priest of San Callisto (1851-66)
- Previous post: Bishop of Périgueux (1836-40)

Orders
- Ordination: 22 July 1817 by Jean-Baptiste de Latil
- Consecration: 6 March 1836 by Hyacinthe-Louis de Quélen
- Created cardinal: 30 September 1850 by Pope Pius IX
- Rank: Cardinal-Priest

Personal details
- Born: Thomas-Marie-Joseph Gousset; 1 May 1792 Montigny-lès-Cherlieu, Besançon, France
- Died: 22 December 1866 (aged 74) Reims, France
- Parents: Thomas Gousset; Marguerité Bournon
- Motto: Quoe seminaverit homo hoec et metet
- Coat of arms

Thomas-Marie-Joseph Gousset (born at Montigny-lès-Cherlieu, a village of Franche-Comté, in 1792; died at Reims in 1866) was a French cardinal and theologian.

The son of a vine-grower, he at first laboured in the fields, and did not begin his studies till the age of seventeen. Ordained priest in 1817, he was a curate for several months, and was then charged with teaching moraI theology at the Grand Séminaire of Besançon. He retained this chair until 1830, acquiring the reputation of an expert professor and consummate casuist.

It was then he re-edited with accompanying notes and dissertations the Conférences d'Angers (26 vols., 1823), and the Dictionnaire théologique of Bergier (1826), of which he published another edition in 1843. From these years of his professorship date his clear exposition of the "Doctrine de l' Eglise sur le prêt à intérêt" (1825), "Le Code civil commenté dans ses rapports avec la théologie morale" (1827), and "Justification de la théologie du P. Liguori" (1829).

Summoned to the post of vicar-general of Besançon by Cardinal de Rohan, he fulfilled the duties of post from 1830 to 1835. At this date he was named Bishop of Périgueux, and in the following year he presented to Abel-François Villemain his "Observations sur la liberté d'enseignement", a protest against the monopoly of the university. In 1840 he was called to the Archdiocese of Reims, but his episcopal duties did not prevent him from completing important theological works.

In 1844 appeared in French his "Théologie morale a l'usage des curés et des confesseurs", which ran quickly through several editions. His treatise on dogmatic theology (2 Vols. 1848) had no less success. The dignity of cardinal was conferred on him in 1850, and he was given the titular church of San Callisto on 10 April 1851. In virtue of the Constitution of 1852 he became a senator of the empire, and in 1858 commander of the Legion of Honour. His last works were "Exposition des principes de droit canonique" (1859); "Du droit de l' Eglise touchant le possession des biens destinés au culte et la souverainté temporelle du Pape." (1862)

== Bibliography ==
- Gousset, J. (1903). Le cardinal Gousset: sa vie, ses ouvrages, son influence (in French). Besancon: Henri Bossanne.
- Inauguration du monument élevé à la mémoire de S.E. Monseigneur le cardinal Gousset: le 14 mai 1872 dans l'église Saint-Thomas de Reims (in French). Reims: Matot-Braine. 1872.
