= L'Univers =

French Roman-Catholic newspaper (1833–1919)

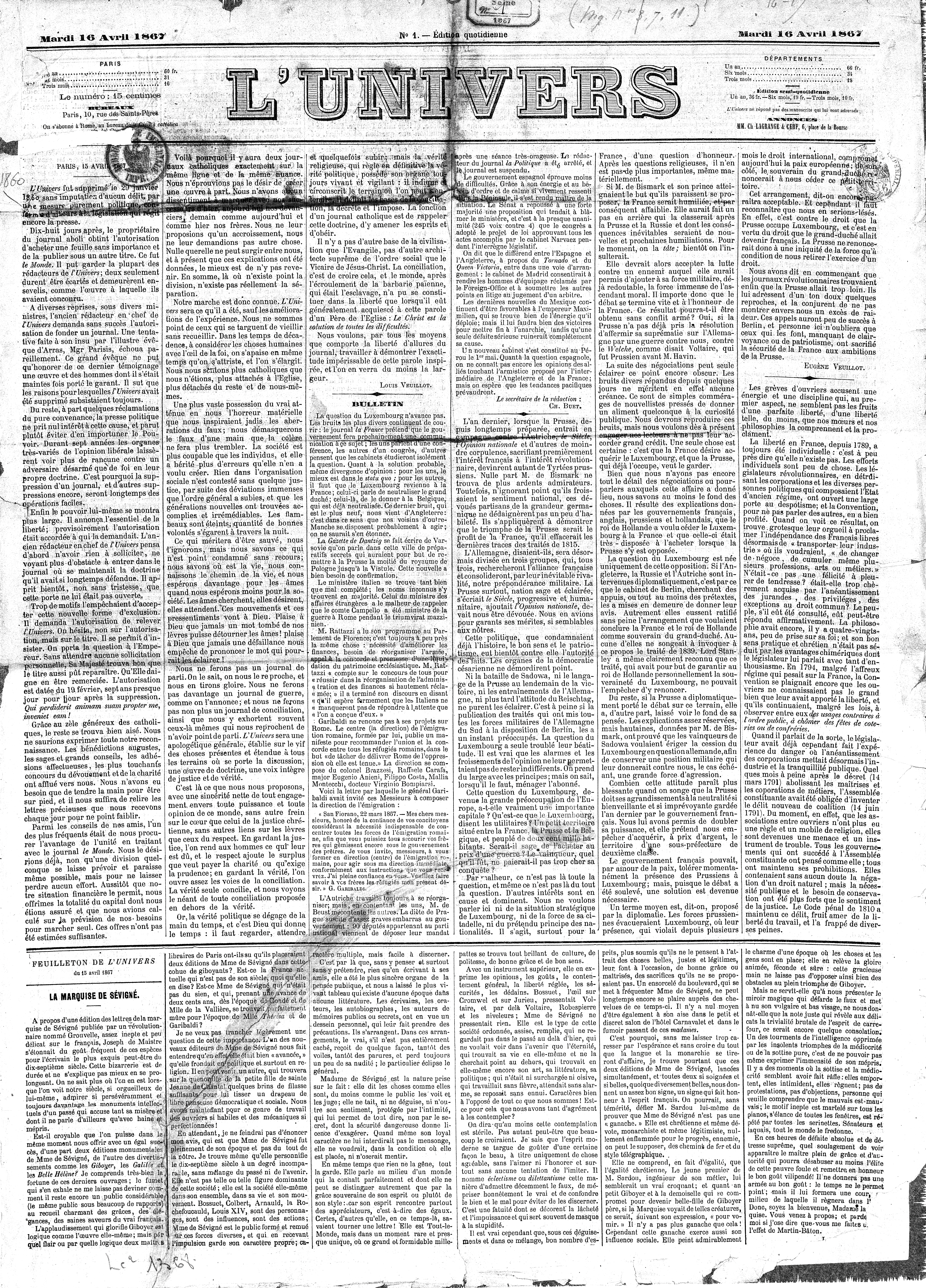
- Front page of L'Univers after its suspension in 1860
- Type: Daily newspaper
- Founded: 1833
- Ceased publication: 1919
- Language: French
- Headquarters: Paris
- Country: France

L'Univers was a French daily newspaper with a Catholic orientation, founded in 1833 by Abbé Jacques-Paul Migne. It ceased publication in 1919.

The newspaper was acquired by Charles de Montalembert in 1838 and, starting in 1840 under the direction of Louis Veuillot, a sharp and skilled polemicist, became the mouthpiece of the "Catholic Party." Ultramontane in orientation and supportive of the temporal power of the Pope, it opposed the Italian policies of Napoleon III and was banned under the Second French Empire. During the French Third Republic, it adopted the legitimist stance of Louis Veuillot. The paper later embraced the Ralliement to the Republic under the leadership of Eugène Veuillot.

== Advocate for the "Catholic Party" ==
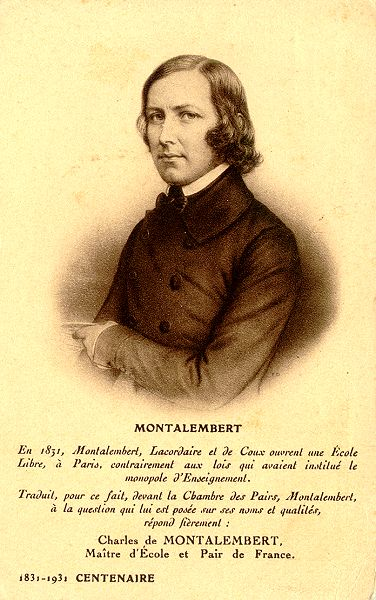
Charles de Montalembert

Initially named L'Univers religieux, the newspaper was founded in November 1833 by Abbé Jacques-Paul Migne, the publisher of the Patrologia Latina. Two years later, Migne sold the title to Emmanuel Joseph Bailly, known as Emmanuel-Joseph Bailly de Surcy (1793–1861). By 1838, L'Univers faced a financial crisis and was on the brink of bankruptcy. Charles de Montalembert, a peer of France and proponent of liberal Catholicism, stepped in to save the publication. Montalembert took on the newspaper's debts with the help of his father-in-law, Félix de Mérode, and assumed editorial control.

=== Early struggles ===
Montalembert sought to unify a "Catholic Party" dedicated to securing religious and political freedoms, including the freedom of association for religious congregations and the freedom of education outside the state monopoly established by Napoleon.

Although the newspaper had a dedicated team, including Frédéric Ozanam and correspondents such as Nicholas Wiseman in London, it struggled to gain traction. By 1839, it had only about 1,500 subscribers. Resistance came from legitimist Catholics, who rejected Montalembert's liberalism, and from French bishops who were hesitant to support the paper.

In frustration, Montalembert wrote to a friend: "If L'Univers lacks interest and vigor, where does that come from, if not from the fact that Catholics in France do nothing but sit idle and watch as if it were a play, rather than descending into the arena to defend their most precious assets."

=== Arrival of Louis Veuillot ===
On 24 January 1840, Louis Veuillot joined the staff of L'Univers. Over the next four decades, the newspaper became synonymous with Veuillot's tireless advocacy for Catholic causes. Initially aligned with liberal Catholics, it evolved under Veuillot's ultramontane stance and often incendiary rhetoric.

Montalembert praised Veuillot as "a man after my own heart," but tensions soon emerged. By 1845, Montalembert admitted losing control of the newspaper, though he acknowledged Veuillot's talent.

== Campaign for educational freedom (1840–1850) ==
At its inception, L'Univers championed the principles of liberal Catholicism, continuing the mission of L'Avenir. It argued for the freedom of religion and supported a moderate constitutional monarchy. However, Veuillot's combative tone alienated both Gallican clergy and the Vatican, leading to frequent seizures of the newspaper within the Papal States.

The passage of the Falloux Law in 1850, which granted secondary education freedom in France, marked the end of the "Catholic Party" unity. Veuillot criticized the law as insufficient, further deepening divisions.

== Under the Second Empire: Ultramontanism and temporal power ==
During the Second French Empire, Veuillot initially supported Napoleon III's regime but turned against it when Napoleon III wrote a pamphlet Le Pape et le Congrès (The Pope and the Congress) in December 1859 suggesting that the Pope should relinquish the Papal States for the sake of a United Italy. The pamphlet was condemned by the Pope, a condemnation repeated by Veuillot and L'Univers. L'Univers was suspended on 30 January 1860.

== Ralliement to the Republic ==
L'Univers resumed publication on 16 April 1867. After Veuillot's death in 1883, his brother Eugène led the paper in adopting the Ralliement policy endorsed by Pope Leo XIII.

During the Dreyfus Affair, the paper initially opposed Alfred Dreyfus but later advocated for a retrial after the discovery of forged evidence. In October 1899, Eugène Veuillot wrote: "It would be unjust to extend to all Catholics the reproaches justified by the attitudes of a few."

== Demise ==
In 1912, L'Univers was acquired by Catholics aligned with the Action Française. It ceased publication in 1914 due to World War I, briefly reappeared in 1917 as a weekly, and disappeared for good in 1919.
