= Éditions du Centurion =

- Parent company: Augustinians of the Assumption
- Status: Active
- Founded: 1945
- Country of origin: France
- Headquarters location: 3 rue Bayard, 8th arrondissement of Paris
- Publication types: Children Books; Printing press
- Official website: www.editions-lecenturion.fr

The Éditions du Centurion are a French publishing house established in Paris, 3, rue Bayard, in 1945 by the Assumptionists fathers of the "Maison de la Bonne Presse" which became Bayard Presse in 1969.

It then became an autonomous department of the Bayard-Presse group. the Editions du Centurion publish the daily newspaper La Croix, the weekly Le Pèlerin, the monthlies Notre Temps, Panorama, Pomme d'Api.

In the 1990s, the catalog was gradually absorbed under the Bayard brand.

At the end of 2013, the brand Le Centurion was revived to develop a new catalog of books for the youth and adult public.
