= Emmanuel-Joseph Bailly de Surcy =

- Born: March 8, 1794; Brias, France
- Died: April 12, 1861 (aged 67); 6th arrondissement of Paris, France
- Burial place: Berteaucourt-lès-Thennes, France
- Occupations: Pedagogue, Printer, Journalist
- Spouse: Apolline-Marie-Sidonie Vrayet de Surcy
- Children: Emmanuel Bailly, Vincent de Paul Bailly
- Parent(s): Joseph-André Bailly and Reinz Fauquennoy

Emmanuel-Joseph Bailly de Surcy (née Emmanuel-Joseph Bailly; 1794–1861) was a French printer and journalist. He played an active role in the Catholic revival in 19th-century France and dedicated his life to Catholic activism and pedagogy.

== Biography ==
Emmanuel-Joseph Bailly, known as Bailly de Surcy, was born in Brias, Pas-de-Calais, on March 8, 1794 (18 Ventôse Year II), into a devoutly Catholic family. His father, Joseph-André Bailly, held various professions, including being a schoolteacher in 1822 and a farmer in 1830. During the French Revolution, Vincent de Paul's manuscripts and some of his relics were entrusted to his father.

Bailly was briefly a student at the Saint-Acheul College in Amiens. He initially aspired to become a priest and studied theology at the Amiens Seminary in 1815, but his vocation was questioned by his mentors. After a brief stint teaching for the Lazarists at the minor seminary in Soissons, he abandoned his religious aspirations and discovered his passion for pedagogy.

In 1818, he moved to Paris, where he married Apolline-Marie-Sidonie Vrayet de Surcy on July 22, 1830. At his father-in-law's request, he added "de Surcy" to his name.

The couple had six children, including Emmanuel Bailly, the third Superior General of the Assumptionists, and Vincent de Paul Bailly, founder of the Catholic periodicals Le Pèlerin and La Croix. Bailly's later years were marked by poor health and financial struggles. He died on April 12, 1861, in Paris and was buried in Berteaucourt-lès-Thennes.

== Contributions to pedagogy ==
In Paris, Bailly de Surcy established a residence for provincial students, providing accommodation and spiritual guidance. In 1819, he founded a family-style boarding school that catered to Catholic families, eventually moving the institution to Rue de l'Estrapade. Among his notable students were Frédéric Ozanam and Charles Baudelaire.

He also organized conferences on philosophy, law, and literature to educate future leaders aligned with Christian values. These initiatives attracted prominent intellectuals like Henri Lacordaire and Alexis de Tocqueville.

== Printing and journalism ==
In 1828, Bailly co-founded the semi-weekly review Le Correspondant, aimed at uniting Catholic activists. After the July Revolution of 1830, he replaced it with the monthly Revue Européenne, which had limited success.

In 1833, he acquired a printing press on Place de la Sorbonne and later founded the Catholic newspaper L'Univers. Although initially successful, the paper faced financial difficulties, leading to its eventual takeover by Charles de Montalembert and its editorial leadership passing to Louis Veuillot.

== Legacy ==
Bailly de Surcy played a pivotal role in establishing the Society of Saint Vincent de Paul in 1833, alongside Frédéric Ozanam and others. The organization focused on charitable work, such as visiting the poor, and quickly expanded across France and internationally.

Bailly's extensive correspondence and documents are preserved in the archives of the Augustinians of the Assumption in Rome. His contributions to Catholic education, journalism, and charity remain influential in the history of 19th-century French Catholicism.
