= Vincent de Paul Bailly =

French Catholic priest (1832–1912)

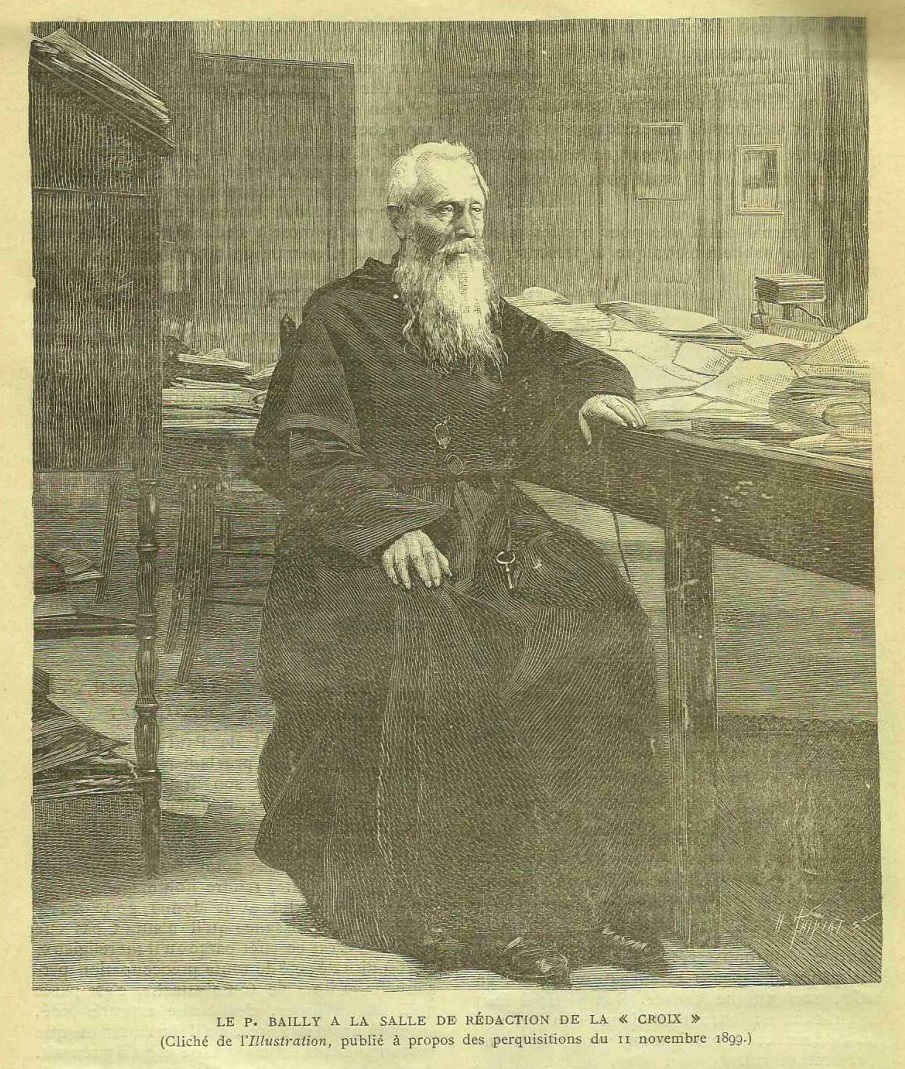
- Born: December 2, 1832; Berteaucourt-lès-Thennes, France
- Died: December 2, 1912 (aged 80); Paris, France
- Occupations: Catholic priest, journalist
- Known for: Founder of Le Pèlerin and La Croix

Vincent de Paul Bailly (December 2, 1832 – December 2, 1912) was a French Catholic priest and journalist. He was an influential figure in the Catholic press and played a pivotal role in the foundation of two major French Catholic publications, Le Pèlerin and La Croix.

== Biography ==
Vincent de Paul Bailly was born on December 2, 1832, in Berteaucourt-lès-Thennes, the second of six children of Emmanuel-Joseph Bailly de Surcy, a journalist and printer. He completed his baccalauréat ès lettres before the age of sixteen.

From a young age, Bailly was active in the Society of Saint Vincent de Paul, becoming a member of its Central Council in 1855. Although he had ambitions to train at St-Cyr to become an army officer, he joined the Assumptionists in 1860 and followed in his father's footsteps as a printer. Bailly founded Le Pèlerin in 1873 and La Croix in 1880.

During the Dreyfus Affair, La Croix came under criticism for its vehement opposition to the revision of the trial. The publication was accused of leading campaigns against Republicans, Jews, Protestants, and Freemasons. This led to the dissolution of the French branch of the Assumptionist congregation in January 1900 by the anti-Catholic government of Pierre Waldeck-Rousseau. Following intervention by the Pope, the leadership of La Croix was transferred to lay individuals.

Bailly died in Paris on the morning of December 2, 1912, his 80th birthday.
