= Étienne Pernet =

Venerable Étienne Pernet
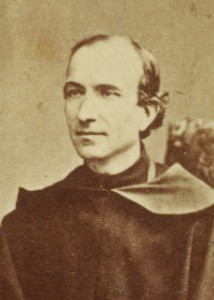
- Pere Etienne Pernet
- Born: Claude-Étienne Pernet-Cordelet; July 23, 1824; Vellexon, France
- Died: April 3, 1899 (aged 74)
- Occupation: Priest
- Title: Father

Étienne Pernet A.A. (1824–1899, born Claude-Étienne Pernet-Cordelet) was a French Roman Catholic priest of the Congregation of the Augustinians of the Assumption, and co-founder of the Little Sisters of the Assumption. He was declared venerable by John Paul II in 1983.

== Biography ==
He was born on the July 23, 1824 at Vellexon, a small village in Franche-Comté (in the east of France), into a Christian family, country people of humble background. His father was an agricultural labourer and also worked at the blast furnaces attached to the ironworks in the region. His mother, Magdeleine Cordelet was the village midwife. Étienne was the second of seven children, of whom only four survived. His father died young; Étienne was fourteen years old at the time. His education was provided by the village priest.

The family gradually sank into poverty. To prepare for the seminary, he left his village to go to school at Membrey. He then entered the seminary of Luxeuil in 1840, studied philosophy at Vesoul in 1842, and theology at Besançon in 1843. He was then 19 years old, but was afraid of the challenge of the priesthood, and left the seminary.

At the age of twenty, Permet became a preceptor in an orphanage, then a tutor for wealthy families. He left for Paris in 1849 to look for a more stable job. There he experienced the difficulties of all those who arrive in a big city without experience, without friends, and feeling homesick, at a loss, he fell ill. Every day he went to the Basilica of Notre-Dame-des-Victoires. Mother M. Eugénie de Jésus, foundress of the Religious of the Assumption, advised him to go see Father Emmanuel d'Alzon, who needed teachers. The priest had just founded a new Congregation, the Augustinians of the Assumption. Étienne Pernet taught at the college of Nîmes, then became one of the first Assumptionists.

He continued to teach and then became prefect in various colleges and at the same time prepared for the priesthood. In 1850, aged 26, he pronounced his first religious vows. He was ordained a priest on April 3, 1858, then continued as prefect and teacher. In 1858, on April 3, he was ordained a priest. He also supervised a club that cared for some 200 children from working-class families.

He recounted his experience :

I've always had a love for the poor in my heart. Coming from a working-class background, my parents were rural workers, I already had some inkling of it ; however, I wasn't in the family home very much. It was at Nîmes, when Fr d'Alzon was at the height of his activity as a man initiating charitable works, that I really understood what you call "the hardships afflicting workers" and a possible response to bring to them.

Timid by nature, with frail health, he painfully bore this question for fourteen years :"I had suffered, severely, for fourteen years to be certain of what God wished of me."

Sent to Paris in October 1863, join the community of the Rue François 1er, and helped Father Ricard. A simple man, he entered easily into contact with people, gained the trust of all by his kindness and understanding. He heard confessions, preached and visited the sick. Pernet felt more comfortable in his priestly ministry than at the college. More and more affected by the suffering and disarray of workers' families, especially when the mother of the family was ill, he felt an apostolic call.

== Founder ==
It was in this context that in May 1864 he met two nurses who came to ask him find work for them and some months later met M. Antoinette Fage with whom he became the founder of the Congregation of the Little Sisters of the Assumption to create a religious congregation of nurses serving the sick poor. He settled successively in various temporary accommodations before establishing them in April 1870 in the 15th arrondissement at 57 rue Violet, which became the motherhouse of the new congregation. The first nuns took their vows in 1866. Their aim is to provide free care to the sick in their homes.

Father Pernet was called as a theological expert at the Vatican Council I. During the War of 1870, he enlisted as a military chaplain. Taken in Metz for a spy, he was arrested by the Germans. Once liberated, he left for Mainz with the other French soldiers and then returned to Paris. He arrived there in March 1871 at the beginning of the events of the Paris Commune. Arrested by the Communards, he escaped execution thanks to a friend who had him released. He then went to Arras to take care of an orphanage.

Back in Paris after the events, Father Pernet devoted himself fully to his foundation. He multiplied the creation of other establishments, first in Paris and the suburbs, then in the provinces with Perpignan in 1878, and in June 1880 set up an establishment in England, his first establishment abroad, east of London. He set up a foundation in the United States in 1891, then another in Rome in 1896, and met Pope Leo XIII in private audience on that occasion. In 1896, Fr Pernet sought approval from Rome for the congregation. The "brief laudation", the first official mark of approval of his work by Rome, was published on April 2, 1897.

After a two-day illness, he died in Paris on Easter Monday, April 3, 1899, the anniversary of his priestly ordination. He is buried in the chapel of the mother house, rue Violet2.

== Veneration ==
Pernet's spiritual writings were approved by theologians on 5 June 1927 and 13 February 1942. His cause was formally opened on 30 March 1931, granting him the title of Servant of God.

Father Etienne Pernet's "heroic virtues" were recognized by Pontifical Decree of 14 May 1983 by Pope John Paul II, who thus recognized him as Venerable.

== Legacy ==
Place Étienne-Pernet in Paris is named after him, as is Pernet Family Health Service, a certified home health care agency in Worcester, Massachusetts.
