= Religious of the Assumption =

Roman Catholic religious congregation for women

- Sorores ab Assumptione in Coelum Beatae Mariae Virginis
- Abbreviation: RA
- Established: 1839 (187 years ago)
- Founders: Saint Marie-Eugénie de Jésus
- Founded at: Paris, France
- Type: Centralized Religious Institute of Consecrated Life of Pontifical Right (for Women)
- Headquarters: 17 rue de l'Assomption, Paris, France
- Region served: 33 countries in Europe, Asia, Americas and Africa
- Members: 1200
- Superior General: Sr. Rekha M. Chennattu, RA
- Affiliations: Roman Catholic Church
- Website: http://assumpta.org/

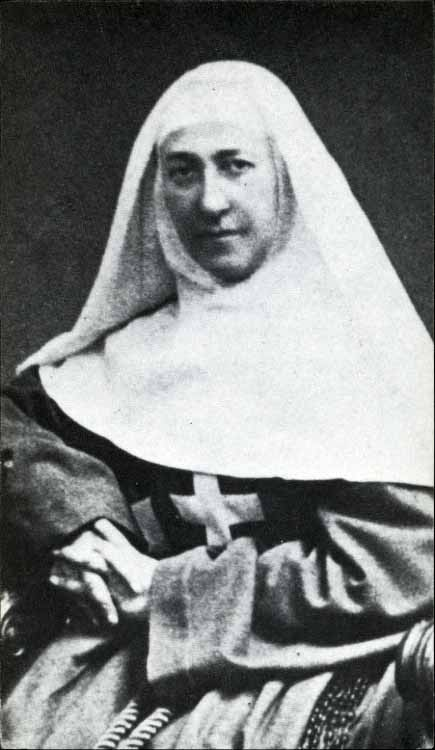
Marie Eugénie de Jésus Milleret de Brou

The Religious of the Assumption, also known as the Sisters of the Assumption, are an international Roman Catholic congregation of pontifical right. Founded by Saint Marie-Eugénie Milleret in 1839, they are dedicated to the transformation of society through education.

== Foundation ==
On 30 April 1839, under the guidance of a certain Father Combalot, Anne-Eugénie Milleret de Brou (religious name Marie-Eugénie de Jésus) founded the congregation in Paris. Combalot was a well-known orator of the time, who had been inspired to dedicate a congregation to Our Lady of the Assumption during a pilgrimage. He instructed Marie-Eugénie and the first community for two years, before parting ways with them in 1841.

The congregation expanded quickly with new communities and schools founded in France and beyond: England (1850), Nîmes (1855), Bordeaux (1860), Lyon (1862), Spain (1865), Italy (1888), Rouen (1889), Nicaragua (1892), and the Philippines (1892). In 1857, the Mother House was established in Auteuil, a village on the outskirts of Paris, where the daughter of Confederate President Jefferson Davis was briefly enrolled in 1869.

Now at the head of a rapidly-growing congregation, Marie-Eugénie dedicated herself to the writing of Constitutions inspired by the Rule of St Augustine. In 1867, the congregation received its decretum laudis and in 1888, the final Constitutions were approved.

In 1894, Marie-Eugénie stepped down as Superior General. She died on 10 March 1898, was beatified on 9 February 1975 by Pope Paul VI, and canonized on 3 June 2007 by Pope Benedict XVI.

Along with a white veil and wimple, the original habit of the sisters was purple with a white cross on the breast. Today, the habits vary across the continents, but all retain some dimension of purple (liturgical color of penance and conversion) and white (liturgical color of joy).

== Present day ==
The Religious of the Assumption are a contemplative and apostolic congregation rooted in the mystery of the Incarnation of Jesus Christ.

Their commitment to the Divine Office, Adoration, community life, and education enable them to respond to the challenges and calls of modern society. They are present in:

- Europe: Belgium, England, France, Italy, Lithuania, Spain
- Asia: India, Japan, Philippines, Thailand, Vietnam
- America: Argentina, Brazil, Cuba, Ecuador, El Salvador, Guatemala, Mexico, Nicaragua, United States
- Africa: Benin, Burkina Faso, Cameroon, Chad, Côte d'Ivoire, Democratic Republic of Congo, Guinea, Kenya, Madagascar, Niger, Rwanda, Tanzania, Togo

With lay partners, the sisters live the mission of transformative education in a wide variety of forms: schools, formation centers, student hostels, spiritual retreats, pastoral ministry, and social work. The Assumption Mission Associates (AMA) is an affiliated organisation providing volunteer placements for young adults in one of the congregation's projects.

The Mother House and the Sanctuary of Saint Marie-Eugénie are located in Paris, at 17 rue de l'Assomption (16th arrondissement). The chapel, dedicated to Christ the Mediator, was constructed in 1961 by the architect Noël Le Maresquier and features stained glass panels by Maurice Max-Ingrand.

== Superiors General ==
- Mother Marie-Eugénie de Jésus (1844–1894)
- Mother Marie-Célestine of the Good Shepherd (1894–1921)
- Mother Marie-Catherine de l'Enfant-Jésus (three months in 1921)
- Mother Marie-Joanna de l'Incarnation (1922–1953)
- Mother Marie-Denyse du Saint-Sacrement (1953–1970)
- Sister Hélène-Marie du Saint-Sacrement (1970–1982)
- Sister Clare Teresa Tjader (1982–1994)
- Sister Maria Cristina Gonzalez (1994–2006)
- Sister Diana Wauters (2006–2012)
- Sister Martine Tapsoba (2012–2018)
- Sister Rekha M. Chennattu (2018–present)

== Assumption family ==
The Assumption family is made up of five congregations with ties to Saint Marie-Eugénie and/or Father Emmanuel d'Alzon. With each their particular charism, they work for the extension of the Kingdom. Including the Religious of the Assumption, there are also:

- The Augustinians of the Assumption (Assumptionists), founded in 1845 by Emmanuel d'Alzon, Marie-Eugenie's spiritual director and great friend
- The Oblates of the Assumption, founded in 1865 by Marie Correnson and Emmanuel d'Alzon for the evangelisation of the East
- The Little Sisters of the Assumption, founded in 1865 by Antoinette Fage and the Assumptionist priest Etienne Pernet to serve the most disadvantaged
- The Orantes of the Assumption, founded in 1896 by Isabelle de Clermont-Tonnerre and the Assumptionist priest François Picard to pray for the works of the Assumption family

The Religious of the Assumption also have a particular relationship with the Missionary Sisters of the Assumption, who separated from them in 1853.
