= Jean-Bertin Nadonye Ndongo =

Congolese Catholic prelate (born 1965)

The Most Reverend Jean-Bertin Nadonye Ndongo
- Bishop of Lolo, Democratic Republic of the Congo
- Church: Catholic Church
- Archdiocese: Roman Catholic Archdiocese of Mbandaka-Bikoro
- See: Roman Catholic Diocese of Lolo
- Appointed: 29 January 2015
- Installed: 12 April 2015
- Predecessor: Ferdinand Maemba Liwoke
- Successor: Incumbent

Orders
- Ordination: 2 August 1993
- Consecration: 12 April 2015 by Joseph Kumuondala Mbimba
- Rank: Bishop

Personal details
- Born: Jean-Bertin Nadonye Ndongo; 24 March 1965 (age 61) Botuzu, Province of Équateur, Roman Catholic Diocese of Molegbe, Democratic Republic of the Congo

Styles of Jean-Bertin Nadonye Ndongo
- Reference style: Your Lordship; The Most Reverend
- Spoken style: His Lordship
- Religious style: Bishop

Jean-Bertin Nadonye Ndongo O.F.M. Cap. (born 24 March 1965) is a Congolese Catholic prelate who is the bishop of the Roman Catholic Diocese of Lolo in the Democratic Republic of the Congo since 29 January 2015. Before that, from 2 August 1993 until he was appointed bishop, he was a priest of the Order of Friars Minor Capuchin. He was appointed bishop on 29 Jan 2015 by Pope Francis. He was consecrated as bishop on 12 April 2015. From 17 May 2021 until 7 July 2024, while a bishop, he concurrently served as apostolic administrator of the Roman Catholic Diocese of Buta in the Democratic Congo.

== Background and education ==
He was born on 24 March 1965 in Botuzu, in the Province of Équateur, in the Roman Catholic Diocese of Molegbe, Democratic Republic of the Congo. He attended primary school in Bozene from 1971 until 1978. He attended secondary school in Bongisa/Bwamanda from 1978 until 1984.

He studied philosophy at the Saint Laurent Convent in Bwamanda from 1985 until 1988. He then studied Theology at the Saint Eugene de Mazenod Institute in Kitambo from 1989 until 1993. He holds a Licentiate in Theology awarded by the Catholic University of Kinshasa, where he studied from 1994 until 1996. He also has a Bachelor's degree ("Enseignement secondaire, degré supérieur").

== Priest ==
He professed as a member of the Order of Friars Minor Capuchin (O.F.M. Cap.) on 17 September 1989. He took his perpetual vows as a member of that Order on 17 September 1992. He was ordained a priest of the same religious Order on 2 August 1993. He served as a priest until 29 January 2015.

While a priest, he served in various roles including as:

- Assistant priest at Saint Elisabeth in Gemena, Diocese of Molegbe from 1993 until 1995.
- Vice Rector of the Capuchin Friars in Kinshasa from 1995 until 1996.
- Master of Novices and lecturer at the Institute of Religious Sciences in Bwamanda from 1996 until 1997.
- First Counselor of the General Vice-Province of Congo from 1997 until 1998.
- Pastor of Sacré Coeur de Jésus, in Bwamanda from 1998 until 2001.
- Member of the Economic Council of the Diocese of Molegbe from 1998 until 2001.
- Formator and Rector of the Maison d'études in Kinshasa from 2001 until 2005.
- Vice Coordinator of the Famille Franciscaine in Kinshasa from 2001 until 2005
- Member of the Audit Committee of the Constitutions and General Statutes in 2003.
- Vice-Minister and then Provincial Minister of the Capuchin Friars in the Democratic Republic of Congo from 2005 until 2009.
- President of the Capuchin Conference of Central and Western Africa (CONCAO) from 2005 until 2009.
- Chairman of the Board of Directors of Saint Augustine University of Kinshasa from 2009 until 2011.
- President of ASUMA (Assemblée des Supérieurs majeurs) from 2011 until 2012.
- General Minister of Friars Minor Capuchin, in Rome, Italy from 2012 until 2015.

== Bishop ==
On 29 January 2015, Pope Francis accepted the resignation from the pastoral care of the Diocese of Lolo in the Democratic Republic of the Congo, presented by Bishop Ferdinand Maemba Liwoke. The Holy Father appointed Reverend Father Jean-Bertin Nadonye Ndongo, O.F.M. Cap., Minister of the Capuchin Friars Minor in Rome as Bishop of the Diocese of Lolo.

He was consecrated and installed at Lolo, Democratic Republic of the Congo on 12 April 2015 by the hands of Archbishop Joseph Kumuondala Mbimba, Archbishop of Mbandaka-Bikoro assisted by Bishop Ferdinand Maemba Liwoke, Bishop Emeritus of Lolo and Bishop Fridolin Ambongo Besungu, Bishop of Bokungu-Ikela.

On 17 May 2021, following the resignation of Bishop Joseph Banga Bane from the pastoral care of the Roman Catholic Diocese of Buta in the Democratic Congo, The Holy See appointed Bishop Jean-Bertin Nadonye Ndongo, the Ordinary of the Diocese of Lolo as Apostolic Administrator of Buta. That administratorship ceased on 7 July 2024 when Bishop Martin Banga Ayanyaki, was installed at Buta as the new diocesan bishop.

== See also ==
- Catholic Church in the Democratic Republic of the Congo

== Succession table ==
Catholic Church titles
Preceded by Ferdinand Maemba Liwoke (28 August 1987 - 29 January 2015)	Bishop of Lolo (since 29 January 2015)	Succeeded by Incumbent
