= Berteaucourt =

Berteaucourt may refer to:

- Berteaucourt-lès-Thennes, a commune in the Somme department in Hauts-de-France in northern France.
- Berteaucourt-les-Dames, a commune in the Somme department in Hauts-de-France in northern France.
