= Jean Carlet =

French doctor

- Education: University of Paris
- Scientific career
- Fields: Internal medicine; Infectious disease (medical specialty); Intensive care medicine; Non-governmental organization
- Workplaces: Head of the Intensive Care unit in Hôpital Saint-Joseph (Paris) (1980-2008); Medical director in the Haute Autorité de santé (Government of France) (2008-2010); Consultant for World Health Organization; President of the World Alliance Against Antibiotic Resistance

Jean Carlet is a French doctor specializing in internal medicine, infectious diseases, and intensive care. He is the former Medical director in the Haute Autorité de santé, the president of the NGO World Alliance Against Antibiotic Resistance, and a consultant for the World Health Organization.

Dr. Carlet is engaged in the public education of health-related topics, especially antibiotic resistance. He has provided expert input for the Government of France, and the World Health Organization.

His contributions to public health have been highlighted by Le Monde, France Culture, Le Figaro, La Croix, and Libération.
