= University of the Assumption in Congo =

Coordinates: 0.1406°N 29.2876°E

- Université de l'Assomption au Congo
- Type: Private
- Established: 1982
- Religious affiliation: Catholic
- Location: Butembo, Democratic Republic of the Congo

The Université de l'Assomption au Congo (UAC) is a university located in Butembo, within the Democratic Republic of the Congo.

It was established to provide religious, particularly Assumptionists, with a university-level philosophical education to continue their priesthood training. Later, it also opened to laypeople, as a private educational institution of Catholic orientation. As a private Catholic technical university, its teaching is non-denominational.

== History ==
In 1982, the Saint Augustine Philosophat of Bulengera was created to primarily train religious or recommended major seminarians in philosophical studies preparing for theology in view of Assumptionist priesthood. The Philosophat is characterized by its veneration for Saint Augustine and his intellectual and spiritual heritage. From his thought, the Philosophat adopted the motto:

Noverim me, noverim Te

which translates as:

May I know myself, may I know You

From 1993 to 2002, the Saint Augustine Philosophat of Bulengera was affiliated with the Saint Augustine Philosophat of Kinshasa, as the Butembo campus. This partnership ensured the state recognition of the diplomas it awarded.

In 2002, at the request of the Ministry of Education in the Democratic Republic of the Congo, for provisional approval, the Saint Augustine Philosophat of Bulengera was renamed the Emmanuel d'Alzon Higher Institute of Butembo (ISEAB). It was placed under the patronage of Father Emmanuel d'Alzon, founder of the Augustinians of the Assumption.

On April 18, 2003, in addition to the bachelor's degree in philosophy, the Ministry of Higher Education granted this Higher Institute, by ministerial decree, the power to organize bachelor's degrees in development sciences and techniques and in social information and communication sciences. Additionally, a decree from the same ministry provisionally approved the opening of the second cycle for the three sections.

On June 16, 2006, a ministerial decree and a presidential decree granted final approval to the ISEAB.

On November 22, 2018, the ISEAB changed its name to the University of the Assumption in Congo (UAC) by order of the Minister of Higher and University Education.

== Faculties ==
The University of the Assumption in Congo offers courses in the following faculties:

- Letters and Human Sciences
- Economics and Management
- Polytechnic
- Psychology and Educational Sciences
- Development Sciences

Additionally, it has:

- A doctoral school
- A multidisciplinary research center
- MOTO TV
- A biotechnology laboratory
- A laboratory for manufacturing pavers.

== Research at the university ==
=== Research Centers ===
- Multidisciplinary Research Center
- Ishango Publishing House

=== Journals ===
- Multidisciplinary International Spark Journal
- Ishango Journal

== Academic and research staff ==
The University of the Assumption in Congo has teaching and research staff active in artificial intelligence, information systems, engineering, management, educational technology and applied data science.

- Héritier Nsenge Mpia – associate professor and researcher in artificial intelligence, information systems and machine learning. He has served as Dean of the Sciences and Technology domain at UAC. His research includes contextual artificial intelligence, graduate employability, embedded machine learning and intelligent systems.
- Mystère Kanduki Kivuyirwa – researcher affiliated with UAC working in information systems, data mining, machine learning and natural-language processing. His published work includes research on student orientation using data mining and sentiment analysis of scientific communication.
- Dorcas Masika Muyisa – UAC-affiliated researcher whose work has included applications of machine learning to health and decision-support problems, including prediction of caesarean delivery.
- Zawadi Sirisombola Corinne – academic staff member and researcher at UAC, with research interests including data analytics, information systems and machine-learning applications. She has also held academic administrative responsibilities in management programmes.
- Moïse Kambale Kasambya – researcher in artificial intelligence, computer vision, machine learning and data science. His work includes deep-learning applications in agricultural pest recognition, educational technology and computer vision.
- Christelle Kabunga Kitengera – researcher affiliated with UAC whose work includes educational technology and artificial intelligence applications. She co-authored research on digital evaluation of university teaching and deep-learning-based agricultural pest classification.
- Kahambu Safi Pierrette – researcher and digital-library staff member at UAC. Her work includes web information systems and deep-learning applications in agriculture.
- Mumbere Mulinda Serge – UAC-affiliated researcher working in machine learning, data mining and predictive systems. He has co-authored work on edge-deployable deep-learning systems for agricultural applications.
- Mumbere Kavalami Muyisa – academic and researcher in computer engineering at UAC. He has worked on machine-learning systems for resource-constrained environments, including infant-cry recognition and music classification.
- Kasereka Lusenge – researcher in computer engineering, computer vision and machine learning at UAC. His research includes intelligent audio and classification systems for low-resource environments.
- Kakule Ushindi Pascal – researcher in electrical engineering and intelligent energy systems at UAC. His work includes renewable-energy integration, electrical-network reliability and embedded machine-learning applications.

== Notable alumni ==
- Rose Kahambu Tuombeane – Congolese journalist and women's rights advocate. She is a founding member of the Collectif des Femmes Journalistes (CFJ), an organization supporting women journalists and women human rights defenders in North Kivu. UNESCO has highlighted her work in promoting press freedom and defending women journalists facing threats and attacks. She is also involved in the University of the Assumption in Congo Alumni Forum, where she has served in external cooperation responsibilities.
- Jack-Katson Katya Maliro – Congolese communication and public-health specialist working in risk communication, community engagement and infodemic management. The World Health Organization has identified him as its Risk Communication and Community Engagement (RCCE/CREC) focal point in the Democratic Republic of the Congo. His work has included community engagement and information management during public-health emergencies, including Ebola responses. The University of the Assumption in Congo lists him among the leadership of its Alumni Forum, where he serves in programmes and communications.
- Mbusa Kayithula Jean-de-Dieu – Congolese civic and political figure and alumnus of the University of the Assumption in Congo. He serves as vice-president of the university's Alumni Forum. He was also listed by the Independent National Electoral Commission of the Democratic Republic of the Congo (CENI) as a candidate for the 2023 provincial elections in the Beni constituency of North Kivu.

== See also ==
- Education in the Democratic Republic of the Congo
- List of universities in the Democratic Republic of the Congo
