= Philibert Vrau =

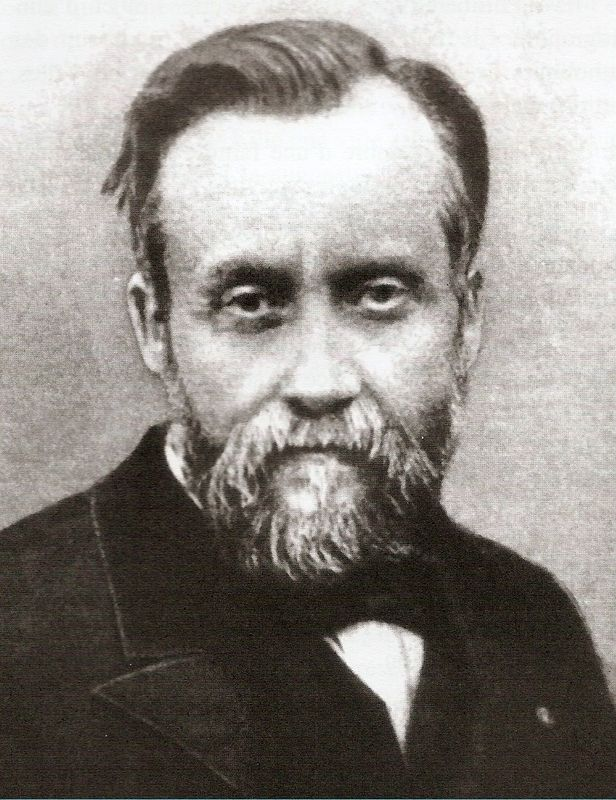
Philibert Vrau

Philibert Vrau (French pronunciation: [filibɛʁ vʁo]; b. at Lille, 19 November 1829; d. there, 16 May 1905) was a French businessman, lay Roman Catholic activist, and Christian socialist.

== Life ==
Vrau's father was a manufacturer of sewing thread; his mother, Sophie Aubineau, was a Parisian. He attended the municipal college of Lille. His teacher, a pupil of Victor Cousin, inspired him with an enthusiasm for philosophy.

He gave up the practice of his Catholic religion for four years. During this time he was active in a purely philanthropic society for the aged poor. After his conversion to Catholicism in 1854, he turned this into a religious society.

Vrau then had to deal with the heavy financial losses of the family firm. With his brother-in-law, the physician Dr. Camille Féron-Vrau (1831–1908), he established religious and beneficial societies for working people, planned model dwellings for them, and also organized a society of employers and employees. They insisted on the right of the labourer to a living wage.

Féron-Vrau was arrested in 1892 for allowing a religious element in the association of employers and employees of which he was president, and it was dissolved by law, but was soon revived under another name. Philibert Vrau was sentenced to a month's imprisonment and a fine for allowing some Sisters of Providence, in secular dress, to continue their superintendence of the women in his factory, a charge that they had begun in 1876.

Nocturnal adoration of the Blessed Sacrament was introduced into Lille by Vrau in 1857. He was largely instrumental in establishing Eucharistic Congresses; the first congress was held at Lille. His nephew, Paul Féron-Vrau, took over in 1900 the Assumptionist imprint "la Bonne Presse", for Catholic works.

== Veneration ==
Vrau's spiritual writings were approved by theologians on 27 February 1924. The cause for his beatification was formally opened on 18 June 1930, granting him the title of Servant of God.
