= Diocese of Lolo =

Roman Catholic diocese in the Democratic Republic of the Congo

Coordinates: 0.1259°S 19.1369°E

Diocese of Lolo Dioecesis Loloensis

Location
- Country: Democratic Republic of the Congo
- Metropolitan: Mbandaka-Bikoro

Statistics
- Area: 10,000 km^{2} (3,900 sq mi)
- Population: Total; Catholics: (as of 2004); 157,000; 79,239 (50.5%)

Information
- Rite: Latin Rite

Current leadership
- Pope: Leo XIV
- Bishop: Jean-Bertin Nadonye Ndongo, O.F.M. Cap.
- Bishops emeritus: Ferdinand Maemba Liwoke

The Roman Catholic Diocese of Lolo (Latin: Loloën(sis)) is a diocese located in the town of Bumba in the ecclesiastical province of Mbandaka-Bikoro in the Democratic Republic of the Congo.

== History ==
- 22 February 1937: Established as Apostolic Prefecture of Lolo from the Apostolic Vicariate of Buta
- 2 July 1962: Promoted as Diocese of Lolo

== Bishops ==
=== Ordinaries, in reverse chronological order ===
- Bishops of Lolo (Latin Rite)
  - Bishop Jean-Bertin Nadonye Ndongo, O.F.M. Cap. (since 29 January 2015)
  - Bishop Ferdinand Maemba Liwoke (28 August 1987 – 29 January 2015)
  - Bishop Joseph Ignace Waterschoot, O. Praem. (2 July 1962 – 28 August 1987); see below
- Prefects Apostolic of Lolo (Latin Rite)
  - Fr. Joseph Ignace Waterschoot, O. Praem. (21 November 1949 – 2 July 1962); see above
  - Fr. Giacomo Jacobs, O. Praem. (1937 – 1948)

=== Auxiliary bishop ===
- Ferdinand Maemba Liwoke (1983-1987), appointed Bishop here

== See also ==
- Roman Catholicism in the Democratic Republic of the Congo

== Sources ==
- GCatholic.org
- Catholic Hierarchy
