= The World of the Bible =

Biblical history journal

The World of the Bible (French: Le Monde de la Bible), published by Bayard Presse, is a 150-page quarterly review that offers a historical, archeological, and artistic approach to the biblical universe. It succeeded Bible et Terre Sainte ('Bible and Holy Land'), ISSN 0006-0712, a periodical published by the eponymous organization from 1957 to 1977. The editor in chief of The World of the Bible is Benoît de Sagazan since October 2008.

Due to its editorial style, The World of the Bible is more appropriately called a review than a magazine. Its writers and contributors are often authorities in their disciplines, which vary from exegesis, history of religions, archeology, to art history.

Established scholars, such as Thomas Römer (professor at the Collège de France), Daniel Marguerat (University of Lausanne), Marie-Françoise Baslez (Sorbonne), Michel Quesnel (Catholic University of Lyon), Simon Claude Minouni (EPHE), Régis Burnet (UCLouvain), Bertrand Lafond (CNRS), François Brossier (professor emeritus at the Catholic Institute of Paris), and archeologist Estelle Villeneuve (Maison René Ginouvès of archeology and ethnology, Nanterre), preside over its editorial and scientific committee.

The review publishes English and French e-books in the fields mentioned above.

It maintains a partnership with Welt und Umwelt der Bibel in Germany and Il Mondo della Bibbia in Italy.
