= Notre Temps =

French monthly lifestyle magazine

- Categories: Lifestyle magazine
- Frequency: Monthly
- Circulation: 707,703 (2020)
- Publisher: Bayard Presse S.A.
- Founded: 1968; 58 years ago
- First issue: May 1968
- Company: Bayard Group
- Country: France
- Based in: Paris
- Language: French
- Website: Notre Temps

Notre Temps (French: Our Time) is a French language monthly lifestyle magazine for seniors published in Paris, France. Founded in 1968 the magazine targets seniors.

== History and profile ==
Notre Temps was established in 1968. The first issue appeared in May 1968. The magazine is part of the Bayard Group and is published by Bayard Presse S.A. on a monthly basis. The headquarters of the magazine is in Paris.

Notre Temps is one of the Catholic publications in France together with La Croix, a daily newspaper and Le Pélerin, a news magazine. All publications are owned and published by the Bayard Group.

The target audience of Notre Temps is people aged between 50 and 64 years. The magazine avoids using such common words as "golden age" and "aged" when referring to its readers. Instead, it refers them using the phrase "people of leisure".

In 1988 the Belgian edition of Notre Temps was started jointly by Bayard Group and Roularta. The magazine was renamed Plus Magazine in Belgium in 2001.

== Circulation ==
The circulation of Notre Temps was 1,040,000 copies in 1999. In 2001 its circulation was 912,000 copies. The magazine sold 1,029,927 copies during the 2003-2004 period. In 2005 it was the eighth best-selling magazine in France with a circulation of 986,000 copies. Its circulation rose to 1,029,000 copies in 2006.

In 2009 Notre Temps was the best-selling French general interest magazine with a circulation of 890,000 copies. The magazine sold 744,582 copies in 2014. The magazine had a circulation of 707,703 copies in 2020.
