= Le Pèlerin =

French Catholic weekly news magazine

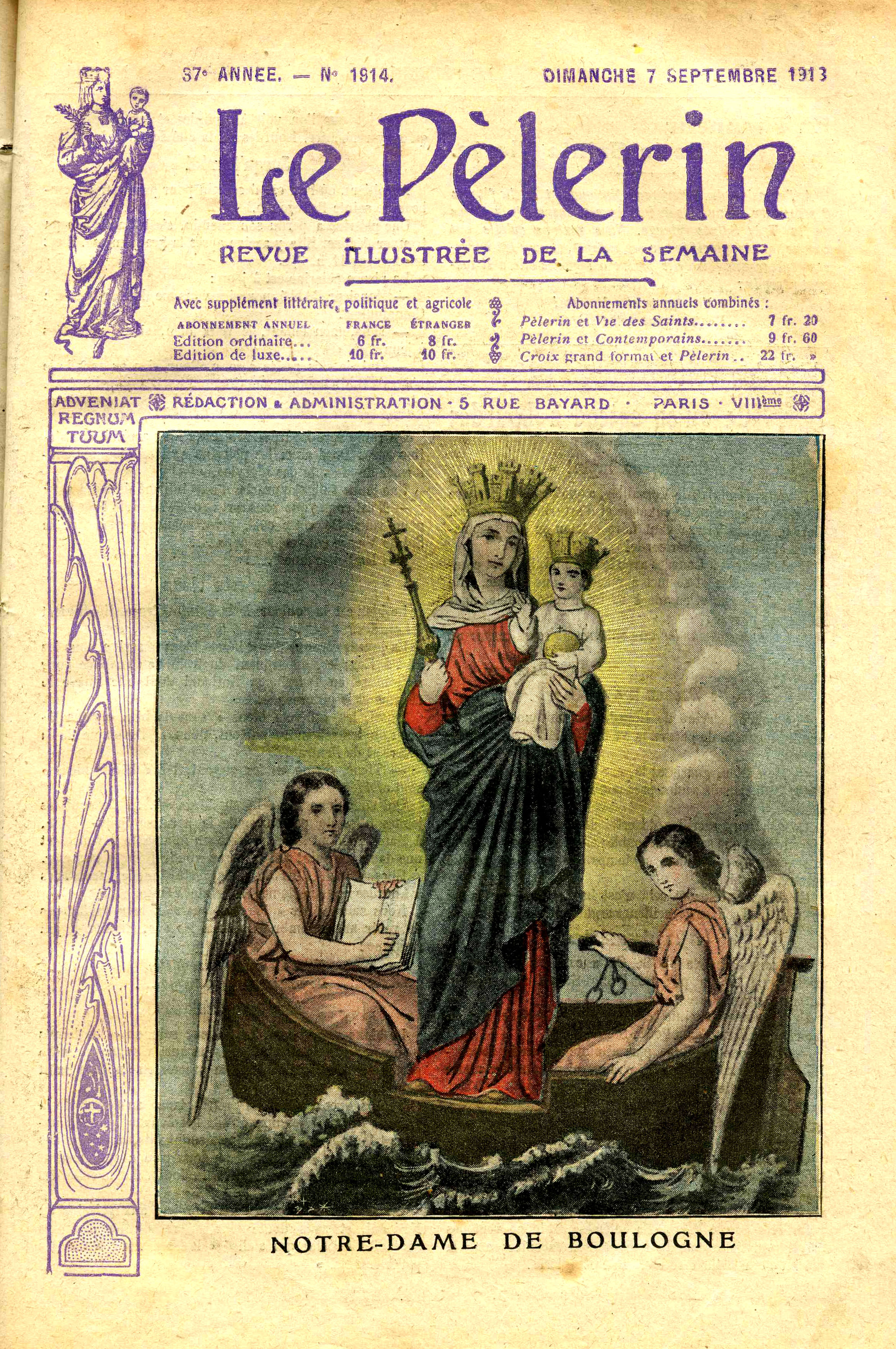
1913 cover of Le Pèlerin.

Le Pèlerin, today simply called Pèlerin (lit. 'Pilgrim'), is a French Catholic weekly news magazine.

== History and profile ==
It was started as a newsletter in 1872. Le Pèlerin was first published as a weekly magazine by the Assumptionists on 12 July 1873. In 1877 it became an illustrated weekly.

The magazine is owned and published by Bayard Presse. It is one of the Catholic publications in France, together with La Croix and Notre Temps. All of them are part of Bayard Presse.

Pèlerin has three main sections: current news, religious and spiritual news, and news on family, recreation and culture.

In 2010 the circulation of Pèlerin was 242,255 copies.
