= Ferdinand Maemba Liwoke =

Congolese Catholic prelate (1937–2025)

His Excellency Ferdinand Maemba Liwoke
- Bishop Emeritus of Lolo
- Archdiocese: Mbandaka-Bikoro
- Diocese: Lolo
- Appointed: 28 August 1987
- Term ended: 29 January 2015
- Predecessor: Joseph Ignace Waterschoot
- Successor: Jean-Bertin Nadonye Ndongo
- Previous posts: Auxiliary Bishop of Lolo and Titular Bishop of Baliana (1983–1987)

Orders
- Ordination: 15 August 1969
- Consecration: 10 July 1983 by Frédéric Etsou-Nzabi-Bamungwabi, Joseph Ignace Waterschoot and Louis Nganga a Ndzando

Personal details
- Born: 8 April 1937 Gamangwa, Belgian Congo
- Died: 26 November 2025 (aged 88) Kinshasa, Democratic Republic of the Congo
- Motto: Ubis Caritas Ibi Est

Ferdinand Maemba Liwoke (8 April 1937 – 26 November 2025) was a Congolese Catholic prelate. He was auxiliary bishop (1983–1987) and bishop of Lolo (1987–2015). Maemba Liwoke died on 26 November 2025, at the age of 88.

Catholic Church titles
Preceded by Joseph Ignace Waterschoot	Bishop of Lola; 1987–2015	Succeeded by Jean-Bertin Nadonye Ndongo
Preceded by Josip Salač	Titular Bishop of Baliana; 1983–1987	Succeeded by Carlos Prada Sanmiguel
