= DiscoveryBox =

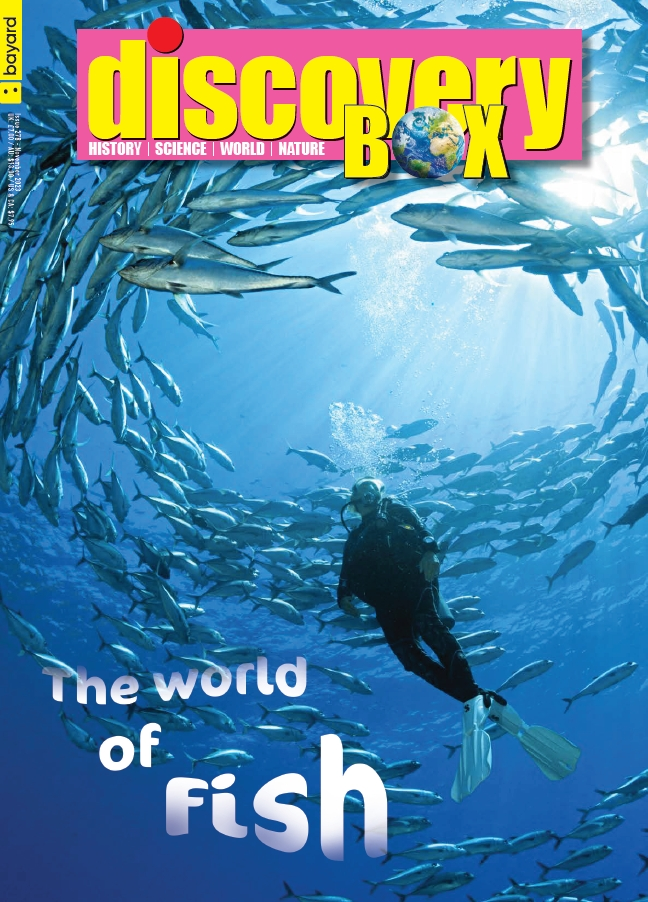
- DiscoveryBox's cover
- Categories: children's magazine
- Frequency: 10 per year
- Founded: 1995
- Company: Bayard
- Country: United Kingdom
- Language: English
- Website: bayard-magazines.co.uk
- ISSN: 1366-9028

DiscoveryBox is a children's magazine by Bayard Presse. It is targeted at children from 7 to 14 years old. Inside there are topics about science, animals, current events, nature, history and the world. It also includes games and quizzes. It is designed for the completely independent reader and is the 3rd and final instalment of the Box series (after StoryBox and AdventureBox).

DiscoveryBox is mostly non-fictional and is designed to answer questions and expand the knowledge of its readers in the subjects that it covers each month.

Because there is a shortage of information magazines for children this age, both ESL and English speaking students like to read this book as the information is specially presented for them. As it is specifically designed for the ages 7 to 14, the magazine takes subjects that they would find interesting such as The Olympic Games, Space Exploration and Avalanches being just a few of the previous topics covered.

In July 2009, DiscoveryBox collaborated with the movie Ice Age: Dawn of the Dinosaurs with a behind-the-scenes look at 3D animation.
