= Martin Banga Ayanyaki =

Congolese Catholic prelate (born in 1972)

The Most Reverend Martin Banga Ayanyaki
- Bishop of Buta, Democratic Republic of the Congo
- Church: Catholic Church
- Archdiocese: Roman Catholic Archdiocese of Kisangani
- See: Roman Catholic Diocese of Buta
- Appointed: 15 April 2024
- Installed: 7 July 2024
- Predecessor: Joseph Banga Bane
- Successor: Incumbent

Orders
- Ordination: 28 August 2003
- Consecration: 7 July 2024 by Cardinal Fridolin Ambongo Besungu
- Rank: Bishop

Personal details
- Born: Martin Banga Ayanyaki; 1 December 1972 (age 53) Dungu, Haut-Uélé, DR Congo
- Coat of arms

Styles of Martin Banga Ayanyaki
- Reference style: Your Lordship; The Most Reverend
- Spoken style: His Lordship
- Religious style: Archbishop

Martin Banga Ayanyaki O.S.A. (born 1 December 1972) is a Congolese Catholic prelate who serves as Bishop of the Roman Catholic Diocese of Buta, DR Congo, since 15 April 2024. Before that, from 28 August 2003 until 15 April 2024, he was a priest of the Order of Saint Augustine. He was appointed bishop on 15 April 2024 by Pope Francis. He was consecrated and installed at Buta, on 7 July 2024 by Cardinal Fridolin Ambongo Besungu, Archbishop of Kinshasa.

== Background and education ==
He was born on 1 December 1972, in Dungu, Haut-Uélé, Democratic Republic of the Congo. He studied philosophy at Saint Augustine Philosophical Seminary in Butembo. He then studied Theology at Saint Eugène de Mazenod University in Kinshasa. He holds a Doctorate in Sociology awarded by the Pontifical Gregorian University in Rome in Italy where he studied from 2014 until 2020.

== Priest ==
He took his solemn vows as a member of the Order of St. Augustine on 30 November 2002. He was ordained a priest of the same religious Order on 28 August 2003. He served as a priest until 15 April 2024.

As a priest he served in many positions of responsibility including as:

- Vice-parish priest in Poko, in the Doruma-Dungu Diocese from 2003 until 2006.
- Councilor of the Augustinian Vicariate from 2006 until 2010.
- Parish priest in Poko Parish from 2006 until 2010.
- Regional Vicar of the Order of Saint Augustine from 2010 until 2014.
- Pastoral collaborator at the Convent of Santa Maria del Popolo, in Rome, Italy from 2014 until 2020.
- Regional Vicar of the Order of Saint Augustine from 2022 until 2024.
- Professor of Sociology and Anthropology at Saint Augustine University in Kinshasa from 2022 until 2024.

== As bishop ==
On 15 April 2024, Pope Francis appointed him as bishop of the Roman Catholic Diocese of Buta, DRC. He was consecrated and installed at Buta on 7 July 2024 by the hands of Cardinal Fridolin Ambongo Besungu, Archbishop of Kinshasa assisted by Archbishop Marcel Utembi Tapa, Archbishop of Kisangani and Archbishop Mitja Leskovar, Titular Archbishop of Beneventum.

== See also ==
- Catholic Church in the Democratic Republic of the Congo

== Succession table ==
Catholic Church titles
Preceded by Joseph Banga Bane (27 September 1996 - 17 May 2021)	Bishop of Buta (since 15 April 2024)	Succeeded by Incumbent
