= Thennes =

- Commune
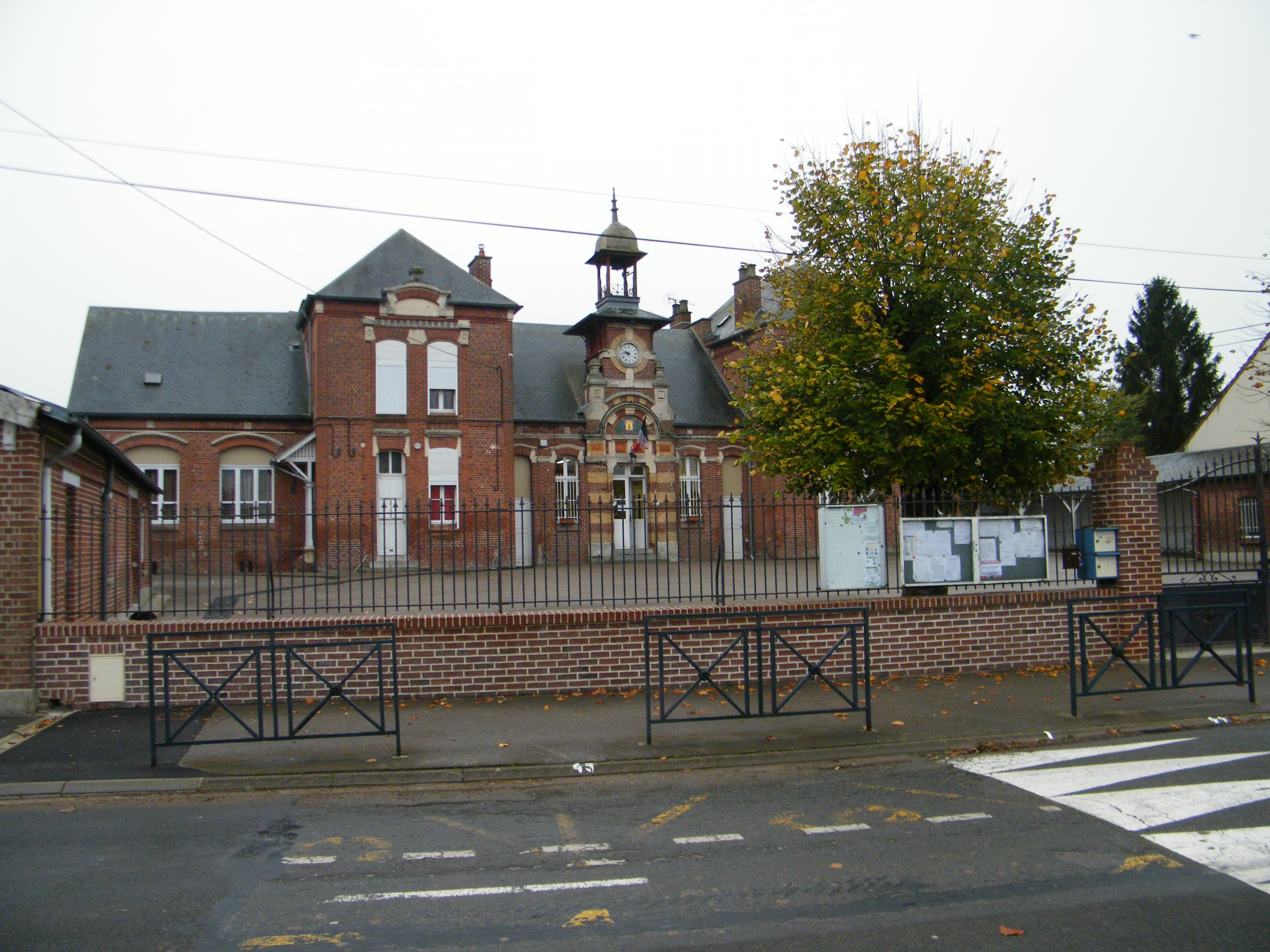
- The town hall in Thennes

- Coat of arms
- Location of Thennes
- Location within France Location within Hauts-de-France
- Coordinates: 49°48′41″N 2°28′17″E
- Country: France
- Region: Hauts-de-France
- Department: Somme
- Arrondissement: Montdidier
- Canton: Moreuil
- Intercommunality: CC Avre Luce Noye

Government
  - Mayor (2020–2026): Philippe Marotte
- Area^{1}: 8 km^{2} (3.1 sq mi)
- Elevation: 33 m (108 ft)
- Highest elevation: 110 m (360 ft)
- Lowest elevation: 32 m (105 ft)
- Population (2023): 552
  - Density: 69/km^{2} (180/sq mi)
- Time zone: UTC+01:00 (CET)
  - Summer (DST): UTC+02:00 (CEST)
- INSEE/Postal code: 80751 /80110
- ^{1} French Land Register data, which excludes lakes, ponds, glaciers > 1 km^{2} (0.386 sq mi or 247 acres) and river estuaries.

Thennes (French pronunciation: [tɛn]) is a commune in the Somme department in Hauts-de-France in northern France.

== Geography ==
Thennes is situated 12 miles (19 km) southeast of Amiens, on the D11a road and bordered to the north and northwest by the river Luce, and to the west by the river Avre.

== Population ==
Historical population
Year	Pop.	±% p.a.
1968	218	—
1975	256	+2.32%
1982	298	+2.19%
1990	338	+1.59%
1999	355	+0.55%
2007	432	+2.48%
2012	469	+1.66%
2017	563	+3.72%
2023	552	−0.33%
Source: INSEE

== History ==
Known as Tanes in 1128, because of the tanneries in the area, it became known as Thannes then Thannes-Thennes in 1507.
The history of Thennes has always been closely linked with that of the neighbouring commune of Berteaucourt-les-Thennes.
From 780, Thennes was the property of the abbey at Corbie, later, as a fiefdom, it passed to the seigneurs of Boves, before returning to Corbie in the 13th century.
Thennes has seen more than its fair share of war:

- During the 16th century against the Spanish, particularly with the siege of Corbie in 1636. Some boatmen of Thennes and Castel burned the Spanish supplies destined for their troops outside Corbie. Louis XIII subsequently exempted them and their descendants from all taxes.
- During the Napoleonic wars of 1814–1815, Cossacks were seen in the commune.
- The Franco-Prussian War of 1870, saw the town very tested. Battles at nearby Mézières and Cachy saw two local men die, of the 22 men who fought.
- During the First World War, being so close to the front line meant the town was all but destroyed.

== See also ==
- Communes of the Somme department
