= Alain Hertoghe =

Belgian journalist

Alain Hertoghe (born 1959) is a Belgian journalist, formerly an employee of the French Catholic newspaper La Croix. He was fired in December 2003 after writing a book critical of the coverage of the U.S. invasion of Iraq by French newspapers Le Monde, Le Figaro, Libération, Ouest-France and La Croix.

== La Guerre à Outrances ==
Entitled La Guerre à Outrances (in English: The All Out War: How the press misinformed us on Iraq), Hertoghe's book claimed that the big five French newspapers were ideological, biased and anti-American in their coverage of the war. He selectively presents articles contradicting themselves, or characteristic of the following lines of thoughts:

- striking attack, immediately followed by predictions of quagmire as soon as US troop regrouped and received reinforcements ("a new Viet-Nam", "the hawks in Washington were mistaken")
- prediction of a humanitarian disaster
- welcoming of difficulties faced by US troops (Schadenfreude)
- predictions of a bloody urban battle in Baghdad (the "new Stalingrad", the "new Budapest").

His position was that anti-Americanism, rather than an explicit understanding between the papers, was the cause for the monolithic position of the press, and that the public was not offered a debate on the issues. He states that Le Monde went the farthest in its defense of the Iraqi regime, calling the newspaper "Saddam's Gazette." It has also been noted that Hertoghe's work is itself partial, selective, and fails to comment on the coverage of the war in foreign countries.

Hertoghe was fired from La Croix in December 2003. The paper justified its decision by claiming that the book was damaging to its reputation and to the authority of its editors, in opposition to its editorial line, and made claims questioning the professional ethics of some of the staff.
