= Little Sisters of the Assumption =

Roman Catholic religious institute founded in 1865

The Little Sisters of the Assumption is a Roman Catholic religious institute founded in France in 1865 by Antoinette Fage (Marie of Jesus) (1824–1883) and Etienne Pernet. The declared work of the congregation is the nursing of the sick poor in their own homes. This labour they perform gratuitously and without distinction of creed.

== History ==
=== Founding ===
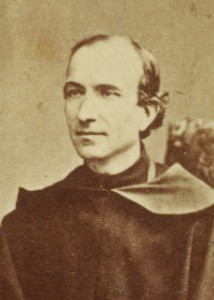
Etienne Pernet

The congregation was founded in Paris in 1865, by Etienne Pernet, an Assumptionist priest, and Marie Antoinette Fage, known in religion as "Marie de Jésus". Both had long been engaged in charitable work, Pernet while a professor in the College of the Assumption at Nîmes, and Fage as a member of the Association of Our Lady of Good Council in Paris. They met in Paris, and Pernet placed Fage in charge of the work of nursing the sick poor which he had inaugurated. Out of this movement the sisterhood grew, Marie de Jesus being the first superior.

The nursing of the sick poor was not the only purpose of the Little Sisters. They endeavoured to bring about conversions, to regularize illicit unions, to have children baptized, sent to school, and prepared for first Communion and Confirmation. They formed societies among their clients and enlisted the aid of laypeople of education and means to further the work of regeneration. The congregation had established houses in Italy, Spain, Belgium, England, Ireland, and the United States of America. The papal brief approving the congregation was issued in April 1897. The Congregation lived a modified monastic lifestyle, adapted from the Augustinians of the Assumption. Up until the liturgical reforms of 1957, the congregation prayed the Little Office of Our Lady in choir. The motherhouse was in Grenelle, Paris.

=== Expansion ===
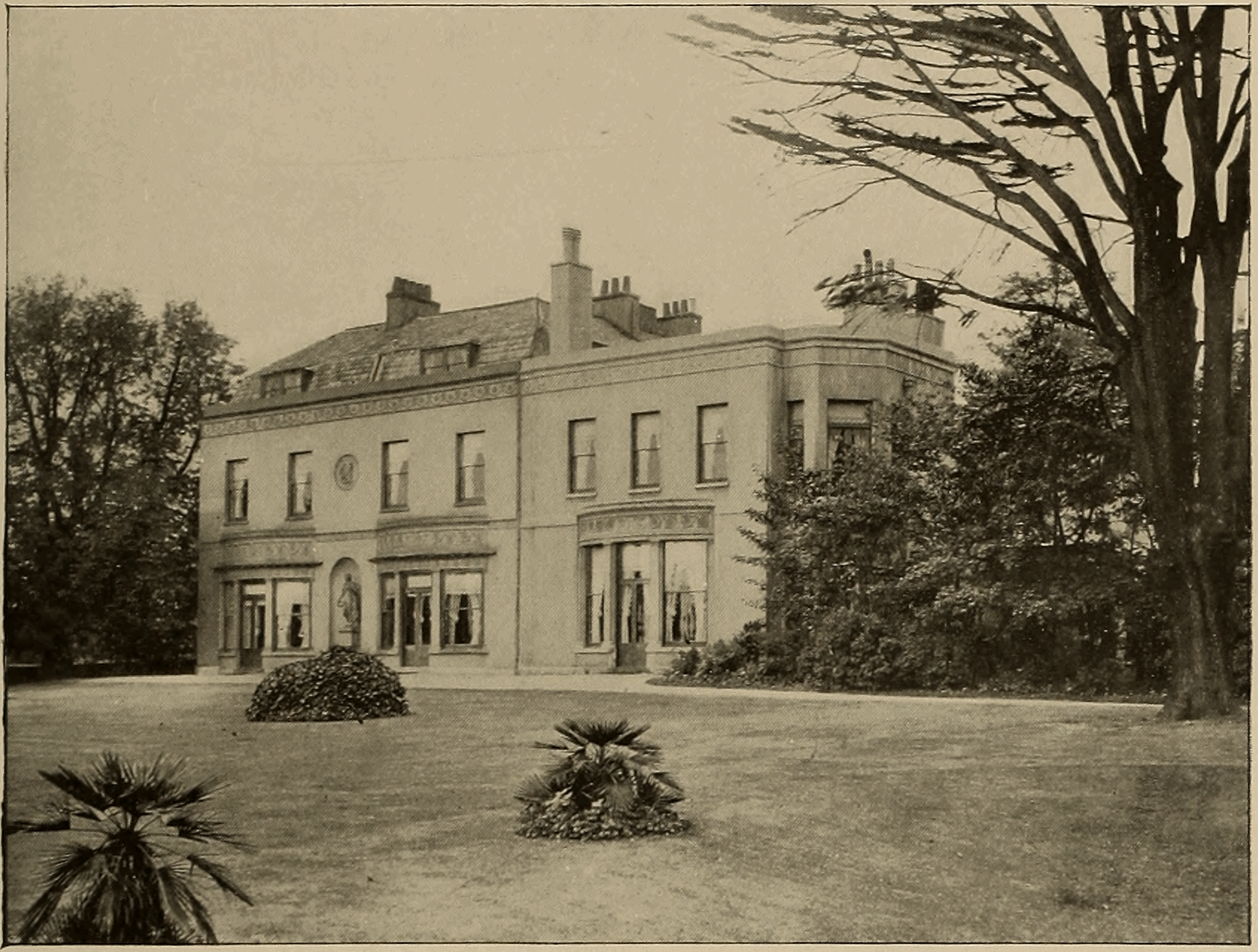
Woodlands House, 1897

In 1880, the first community outside France was established in London, at the request of Henry Edward Manning. Prior to 1921, aspiring young women made their postulancy in France. Differences in language and customs sometimes made this rather difficult. That year, the congregation purchased Woodlands House near Blackheath, London for a novitiate. During the First World War, it had served as a hostel for Belgian refugees. During the 1930s, Woodlands' accommodation was expanded by the construction of an adjacent building (today called Mycenae House); the sisters left Blackheath in 1967, relocating to Paddington.

In 1947, the vicariates of England and Ireland became separate provinces.

The sisters arrived in Dublin in early 1891, at the request of the chancellor of the Archdiocese, on behalf of William Walsh, the Archbishop of Dublin. In impoverished Dublin, much of the donations for the sisters was expended on food and clothing for the poor. In 1897, the sisters extended their efforts to Kingstown; several trained at St. Michael's Hospital. A house was established in Ballyfermot in 1952. In 1978 the sisters moved from Kingstown to Ballybrack, where they continued their public health nursing and pastoral work. In 1899, six sisters established a house in Cork.

In 1946 the congregation divided into provinces. In 1949, four sisters from Dublin established a community at Holywell, followed two years later by one at Llanelli, and in 1958 in Wrexham in Wales. The sisters in Wrexham trained at Maelor Hospital. The sisters also established a community in the Diocese of Dunedin, New Zealand.

In 1949 they incorporated the Servas dos Pobres of Portugal and in 1962 the Little Sisters of Champs, founded in 1844 in Gandalou (Tarn-et-Garonne) by Jean-Baptiste Marie Delpech (1807–1887).

On April 19, 1891, at the invitation of Michael Corrigan, the Archbishop of New York, seven sisters arrived in New York City, the expense of their passage borne by a group of charitable American women. At first the sisters stayed with the Bon Secours Sisters. Within two months, one of the eight, succumbed to typhoid fever, contracted while nursing the sick. A year later they opened a house on E. Fifteenth St. A second house was opened in 1900 on W. 130th St. Initially settling on the Lower East Side, by the 1950s they had moved to Yorkville, caring for families on the East Side, in Harlem and in the South Bronx.

In 1993 there was a split in the Italian province, part of which formed the new congregation of the Sisters of Charity of the Assumption (S.C.A.).

== Present day ==
- In 1947, the Little Sisters of the Assumption arrived in Dorchester, Boston. In 1980, they opened their doors to homeless women and children. Project Hope is a multi-service agency providing low-income women with children access to education, jobs, housing, and emergency services.
- In 1955, the sisters came to Worcester, Massachusetts to provide health care to disadvantaged families. In 1968, they incorporated Pernet Family Health Service, a certified a home health agency.
- In 1958, the "Little Sisters of the Assumption Family Health Service" began in East Harlem.
- Anne Montgomery became known as an advocate among peace communities in America, for her work to disarm nuclear weapons using nonviolent tactics.

== Cities where the order ministers ==
- Philadelphia, Pennsylvania
- Worcester, Massachusetts - Pernet Family Health Service
- Dorchester, Massachusetts - Project Hope
- East Harlem, New York - LSA Family Health Service
- Newburgh, New York - Newburgh Ministry
- Walden, New York
- Dublin, Ireland
- Cork, Ireland
- Galway, Ireland
- Birmingham, England
- Compton, California
