= Marie-Eugénie de Jésus =

French Roman Catholic saint (1817–1898)

Saint Marie-Eugénie de Jésus
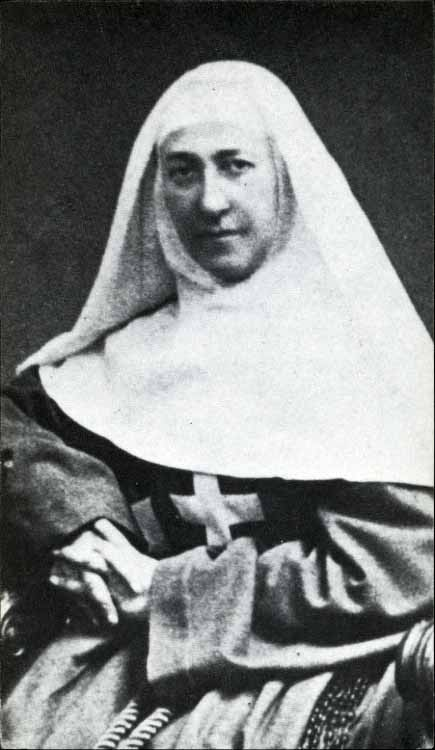
- Marie-Eugénie, c. 1880

Virgin
- Born: Anne-Eugénie Milleret de Brou; 25 August 1817; Metz, Moselle, Kingdom of France
- Died: 10 March 1898 (aged 80); Auteuil, France
- Venerated in: Roman Catholic Church
- Beatified: 9 February 1975, Saint Peter's Square, Vatican City by Pope Paul VI
- Canonized: 3 June 2007, Saint Peter's Square, Vatican City by Pope Benedict XVI
- Feast: 10 March
- Patronage: Religious of the Assumption; Students

Marie-Eugénie de Jésus (born Anne-Eugénie Milleret de Brou; 25 August 1817 – 10 March 1898) was a French Catholic nun who founded the Religious of the Assumption and is a Catholic saint.

Born in a country emerging from years of revolutions, war, and political turmoil, Marie-Eugénie saw a need for the radical transformation of society. To this end, she founded the Religious of the Assumption in 1839, a contemplative and apostolic congregation dedicated to transformative education.

Her beatification was celebrated under Pope Paul VI in 1975 while her canonization was celebrated on 3 June 2007 under Pope Benedict XVI.

== Early life ==
=== Childhood ===
Anne-Eugénie Milleret de Brou was born during the night of 25 August 1817 in Metz as one of five children to Jacques Milleret and Eleonore-Eugénie de Brou. Her father, a follower of Voltaire and a liberal, made his fortune in the banking world and in politics. Her mother had a deep concern for the poor and tended to needy families with the help of her children.

Her family was not religious, but her First Communion on Christmas Day 1829 affected her deeply: she was seized by the immensity of God with "a bond of love". The rest of her life, Anne-Eugénie would refer frequently to this event as her spiritual foundation from which everything else flowed.

In 1830, due to the financial context of the July Revolution, her father went bankrupt and the family château was sold. The Millerets was forced to separate: Mr. Milleret remained in Metz to rebuild his fortune while Anne-Eugénie moved to Paris with her mother.

After losing her mother to cholera in 1832, Anne-Eugénie was entrusted to the care of a wealthy family friend. While she appreciated the luxurious lifestyle, she could not reconcile it with the spirit of justice that her parents had instilled in her. In 1835, she moved in with Parisian relatives but quickly found their narrow piety stifling. Profoundly lost and lonely, she started questioning the meaning of life and happiness.

=== Conversion ===
In 1836, Anne-Eugénie attended a series of Lenten lectures given by Jean-Baptiste Henri Lacordaire at Notre Dame de Paris. His insightful preaching lead her to have a profound conversion experience which would orient her entire life. In a later letter to Lacordaire, she says "Your words answered all my thoughts. They completed my understanding of things; they gave me a new generosity, a faith that nothing would ever be able to make waver again. I was truly converted!".

Desiring to know God more fully, Anne-Eugénie dove into the works of contemporary philosophical writers who were treating questions of society and faith, including Bourdaloue and Joseph de Maistre. In 1837, a year after her conversion, her path crossed with Father Combalot, who spoke to her about the idea of founding a congregation at the service of the education of young girls with a view to social transformation enlightened by the values of the Gospel. To prepare for her role as a foundress, she boarded with the Benedictines of the Blessed Sacrement before undertaking a short noviciate with the Sisters of the Visitation.

== Religious life ==
=== Foundation of the Religious of the Assumption ===
Anne-Eugénie founded the Religious of the Assumption on 30 April 1839, in a small apartment near the church of Saint-Sulpice in Paris. At the congregation's first Mass in November 1839, she and three other women took their religious names; Anne-Eugénie would now be known as Marie-Eugénie de Jésus. On 14 August 1841, she made her initial vows and then made her perpetual profession into the hands of Denis Auguste Affre on 25 December 1844.

To ensure the vitality of her nascent congregation, Marie-Eugénie worked on Constitutions inspired by the Rule of St Augustine. In 1867, the congregation officially became an institute of pontifical right and in 1888, the final Constitutions were approved by Pope Leo XIII.

A tireless foundress, Marie-Eugénie founded thirty religious communities in nine countries. Her first priority was always her sisters: their happiness, their formation, their work. Her letters show a particular concern for their health; more than two hundred sisters were to die before she did, often young and of tuberculosis. She also encouraged the foundation of the Assumptionists and provided initial formation for the other congregations of the Assumption family.

In 1894, after 55 years of service, she resigned as Superior General due to ill health.

=== Key friendships ===
==== Emmanuel d'Alzon ====
Marie-Eugénie first encountered Emmanuel d'Alzon during her noviciate at the Visitation but did not begin a regular correspondence with him until 1841, when he became her spiritual director. Their relation developed into a rich friendship built on mutual trust that would last until his death in 1880. He counselled her on her role as foundress and superior and she encouraged him to found the Assumptionists.

==== Thérèse-Emmanuel O'Neill ====
Thérèse-Emmanuel (born Catherine O'Neill) was part of the small group of young women who formed the first community of the Assumption in 1839. A woman of deep faith, she was a source of comfort and wisdom for Marie-Eugénie and served as the novice mistress of the congregation for over 40 years.

== Death ==
Marie-Eugénie died on 10 March 1898 at 3:00am; she received the Viaticum on 9 March and the Last Rites on 13 February. The Cardinal Archbishop of Reims Benoît-Marie Langénieux celebrated her funeral on 12 March.

Saint Marie-Eugénie de Jésus' tomb is at the congregation's Mother House in Paris, n°17 rue de l'Assomption. One of her relics was also sealed into the new altar of Notre-Dame, after the cathedral's extensive renovation following the catastrophic 2019 fire.

== Beatification ==
The beatification process opened in the Paris archdiocese in an informative process that Cardinal Jean Verdier oversaw from 1934 until its closure in 1936; her writings received theological approval on two separate occasions on 1 February 1939 and on 8 July 1949. The formal introduction to the cause came on 17 April 1940 under Pope Pius XII and she became titled as a Servant of God.

Cardinal Emmanuel Célestin Suhard oversaw the apostolic process from 1941 until 1943 before all documentation from both processes was sent to the Congregation for Rites in Rome who validated these processes on 14 December 1945. An antepreparatory committee approved the cause on 9 May 1951 as did a preparatory one (the first on 30 June 1953 was inconclusive) on 7 June 1960 and the general committee on 6 June 1961. On 21 June 1961 she became titled as venerable after Pope John XXIII confirmed that she had lived a life of heroic virtue. Pope Paul VI beatified her on 9 February 1975 in Saint Peter's Square.

The miracle for canonization investigated in 2003 in the Manila archdiocese while the Congregation for the Causes of Saints validated the process on 30 April 2004. Medical experts approved this miracle on 27 January 2005 as did the theologians on 14 February 2006 and the members of the Congregations for the Causes of Saints on 12 December 2006. Pope Benedict XVI approved this miracle on 16 December 2006 and canonized her on 3 June 2007.

=== Miracle ===
The miracle was the healing of Risa Bondoc (b. February 1995) who was born in the Philippines with a rare brain defect. When Risa was about two months old, medical investigations revealed that the two halves of her brain had not joined, effectively preventing her from walking, talking or otherwise developing. Her adoptive mother, an alumna of Assumption Philippines, brought Risa to Paris, laid her on Marie-Eugénie's tomb and interceded the foundress for her child's healing. Now an adult, Risa walks, talks, and holds a part-time job. The two halves of her brain have still not joined.
