= Le Vigan =

Le Vigan or Vigan may refer to:

== Places in France ==
- Le Vigan, Gard, in the Gard department
- Le Vigan, Lot, in the Lot department
- Saint-Étienne-du-Vigan, previously called Vigan-d'Allier, in the Haute-Loire department

== People ==
- Robert Le Vigan (1900-1972), French actor
