= Diocese of Buta =

Roman Catholic diocese in the Democratic Republic of the Congo

Coordinates: 2.7950°N 24.7364°E

Diocese of Buta Dioecesis Butana

Location
- Country: Democratic Republic of Congo
- Metropolitan: Kisangani

Statistics
- Area: 60,000 km^{2} (23,000 sq mi)
- Population: Total; Catholics: (as of 1995); 259,000; 189,850 (73.3%)

Information
- Rite: Latin Rite

Current leadership
- Pope: Leo XIV
- Bishop: Martin Banga Ayanyaki
- Bishops emeritus: Joseph Banga Bane

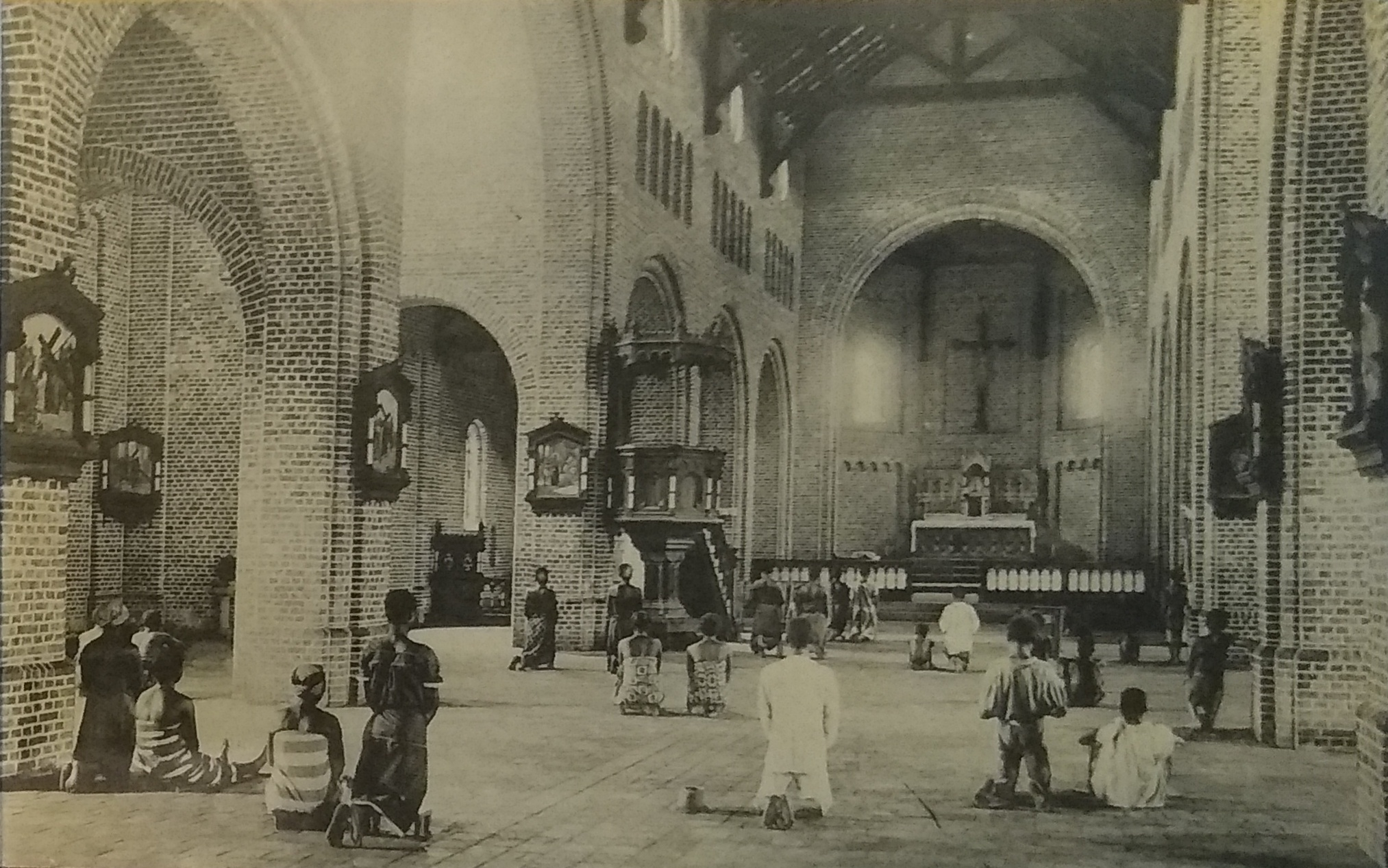
Church interior, Buta - Uélé, Congo

The Roman Catholic Diocese of Buta (Latin: Dioecesis Butana) is a diocese located in the city of Buta in the ecclesiastical province of Kisangani in the Democratic Republic of the Congo.

== History ==
- 12 May 1898: Established as Apostolic Prefecture of Uélé from the Apostolic Vicariate of Léopoldville
- 18 December 1911: Renamed as Apostolic Prefecture of Western Uélé
- 15 April 1924: Promoted as Apostolic Vicariate of Western Uélé
- 10 March 1926: Renamed as Apostolic Vicariate of Buta
- 10 November 1959: Promoted as Diocese of Buta

== Bishops ==
=== Ordinaries, in reverse chronological order ===
- Bishops of Buta (Latin Rite), below
  - Bishop Martin Banga Ayanyaki (since 15 April 2024)
  - Bishop Joseph Banga Bane (27 September 1996 – 17 May 2021)
  - Bishop Jacques Mbali (4 July 1961 – 27 September 1996)
  - Bishop Georges Désiré Raeymaeckers, O. Praem. (10 November 1959 – 10 October 1960); see below
- Vicars Apostolic of Buta (Latin Rite), below
  - Bishop Georges Désiré Raeymaeckers, O. Praem. (4 February 1953 – 10 November 1959); see above
  - Bishop Charles A. Vanuytven, O. Praem. (6 May 1924 – December 1952)
- Prefect Apostolic of Western Uélé (Latin Rite), below
  - Fr. Leone Dérikx, O. Praem. (1912 – 19 February 1924)
- Prefects Apostolic of Uélé (Latin Rite), below
  - Fr. Jérôme van Hoof (1899 – 1901)
  - Fr. Adrien Deckers (1898 – 1899)

=== Coadjutor bishop ===
- Joseph Banga Bane (1995-1996)

== See also ==
- Roman Catholicism in the Democratic Republic of the Congo

== Sources ==
- GCatholic.org
- Catholic Hierarchy
