= Antoinette Fage =

French catholic nun

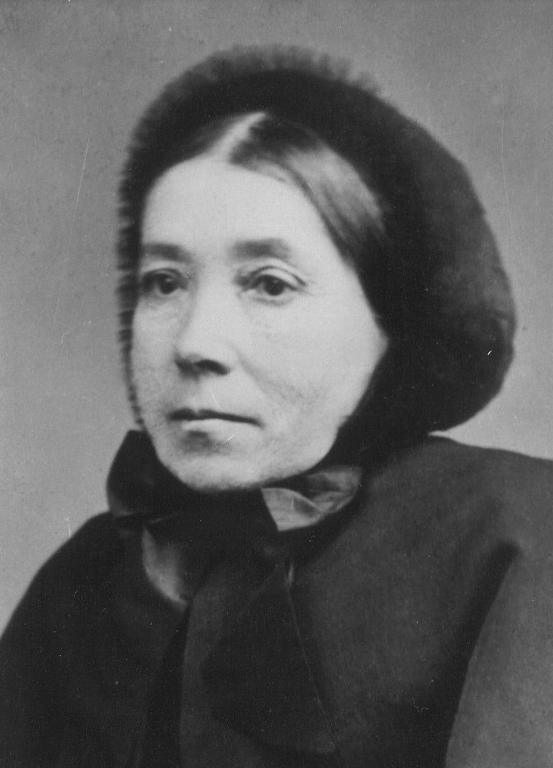
- Born: 7 November 1824; Paris
- Died: 18 September 1883 (aged 58)
- Occupation: nun

Venerable Antoinette Fage (7 November 1824 – 18 September 1883) was a French Catholic nun. With Father Etienne Pernet, she founded the Little Sisters of the Assumption. She took the name Marie of Jesus.

== Life ==
The daughter of Jean Fage, a soldier, she was born in Paris 7 November 1824. Her mother, a seamstress, was deserted by her husband. Desperately poor, her grandmother, Madame Mutinot, provided some assistance. In July 1830 while returning from the market, Madame Mutinot was shot dead at the barricades.

Antoinette was diagnosed at a young age with curvature of the spine. Her growth was stunted, leaving her below average height, with one shoulder higher than the other. Antoinette was orphaned at the age of thirteen and cared for by friends of her grandparents. Around 1850, she began working at a sewing workshop to support herself, and joined the Sodality of Our Lady of Good Counsel, whose members visited the poor to distribute food. She then joined the third order of St. Dominic.

She also became involved in the charitable activities of the Archconfraternity of Notre-Dame-des-Victoires. She visited the poor with food and small offerings of money, becoming so well-known that in 1861, the Mesdames de Meynard asked her to become manager of an orphanage for girls. The house, whose capacity the directors set at eighteen, sheltered girls between the age of twelve and eighteen and taught them skills so that they could find work upon leaving. When the house could take in no more, she found families who would board the girls.

She met Etienne Pernet in 1864 Pernet told her of his plan to form a new religious order. In 1865, she formed the first community of the new group, dedicated to caring for the sick poor in their own homes. Fage took final vows in 1878; she died in 1893.

The congregation was officially approved by the Pope in 1897. By that time, the order had communities in England, Ireland and the United States.

== Legacy ==
The Antoinette Fage Association in Rouen responds to local needs by providing a daycare center, and an after-school center with help with school work, among other services.
