= Emmanuel d'Alzon =

French Catholic priest (1810-1880)

Venerable Emmanuel d'Alzon
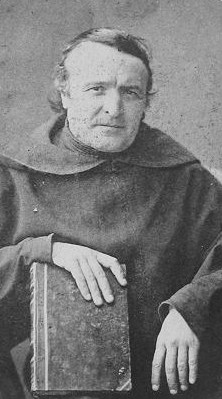

Confessor
- Born: Emmanuel Joseph Marie Maurice Daudé d'Alzon; August 30, 1810; Le Vigan, France
- Died: November 21, 1880; Nîmes, France
- Major shrine: Institut Emmanuel d'Alzon Nîmes, Nîmes, France
- Feast: November 21

Emmanuel d'Alzon, AA (August 30, 1810 – November 21, 1880) was a French Catholic priest who founded the Assumptionists and was a leading figure of the Catholic Church in France in the 19th century.

== Biography ==
=== Early years ===
Emmanuel Joseph Marie Maurice d'Alzon was born the oldest of four children, in Le Vigan, Gard, in southern France, to an aristocratic and intensely Catholic family from the Cévennes Mountains. He was baptized on September 2, 1810, in the church of Saint Pierre in Le Vigan by his uncle, Canon Liron d'Airolles.

In 1816 the family moved to the family château of Lavagnac (Hérault) where d'Alzon received his early education at home from tutors. From 1823 to 1828, d'Alzon studied at the renowned Parisian colleges of Lycée Louis-le-Grand and Collège Stanislas de Paris. It was at the end of his secondary studies that he came into contact with the influential thinker, Félicité de Lamennais, much of whose early teachings on the political order and Christian society would mark the young d'Alzon. For a time, he considered a military career and applying to the École spéciale militaire de Saint-Cyr but was dissuaded by his parents.

In 1828 d'Alzon enrolled in law school in Paris but never finished because of the political upheavals which struck France in 1830. During these years in the French capital he had come to know a host of distinguished young men, some of whom remained friends throughout his life: Henri Lacordaire, who would re-establish the Dominican Order in France; Olympe Philippe Gerbet, founder of La Revue catholique; Théodore Combalot, a noted preacher; and Count Charles de Montalembert; a journalist, historian, and politician. According to Georges Tavard, "It was the influence of Bonald, Joseph de Maistre and Lamennais that made the later d'Alzon a determined opponent of the Gallican party at the First Vatican Council".

=== Middle years ===
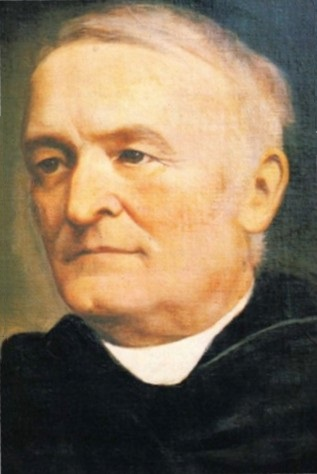
Emmanuel d'Alzon

In 1832, d'Alzon, against the wishes of his parents since he was an only son of a noble family, decided to enter the diocesan seminary of Montpellier. However, the following year, disappointed by the lack of ambition of the students and the lack of depth of the course work, he went to Rome, where he stayed until 1835. There, he completed his theological studies by seeking out outstanding tutors such as the Capuchin Cardinal Micara, the Dominican Father Benedetto Maurizio Olivieri, soon to become master-general of the order, Nicholas Wiseman, the Englishman who would be named a cardinal, Fr. Ventura, superior general of the Theatines, and Father Mazzetti, an influential Carmelite. On 26 December 1834, he was ordained, at the age of 24 . He continued his studies until May of the following year.

Upon his return to France, d'Alzon opted to join the Diocese of Nîmes, where his uncle was a priest. His early years in the ministry were dedicated to confronting Protestants, who made up a third of the local population, and to numerous initiatives such as the founding of youth groups, a home for unwed mothers, libraries for workers, and innumerable retreats, conferences, and sermons. By 1839, he was appointed vicar general of the diocese, a position he held until 1878, two years before his death. All of his endeavours carried the stamp of his ultramontanism to defend the sovereignty of the Pope in religious matters.

In 1843m one of his most cherished dreams became a reality: he acquired a secondary school, the Collège de l'Assomption, in Nîmes, where he hoped to form upper-class students to enter society as Catholic agents of change in a traditionalist mode. With that purchase began one of the greatest struggles of d'Alzon's life, a fight to obtain free and full exercise of private education in the face of the state monopoly. It was at that institution that in 1845, spurred along by his lifelong friend and collaborator, Mother Marie-Eugénie de Jésus, the foundress of the Religious of the Assumption, he founded an order of men, the Augustinians of the Assumption, also known as the Assumptionists. In his own words, the purpose of the order was "to work toward our perfection by extending the reign of Jesus Christ in souls", especially through "education, publication of books, works of charity, retreats, and the foreign missions" (First Constitutions, 1855). He placed his congregation under the guidance of St. Augustine, giving it his name, his rule, and his intellectual tradition.

=== Later years ===
A frequent visitor to Rome, d'Alzon had a meeting with Pope Pius IX in 1862 that would have a profound effect on him and his young congregation. Encouraged by the Pope, he visited Constantinople and soon thereafter decided to invest much of his time, energy, and resources in addressing the needs of the Church in Eastern Europe. As with his concerns to convert Protestants, d'Alzon wished to win back the Orthodox to Rome, so profound was his desire for the unity of Church, as he saw it. Within a few years, he had sent some of his first religious to Bulgaria and eventually to Romania and Turkey; after his death, communities would be established in the Holy Land, Russia, Greece, and Yugoslavia. In 1865, he founded a congregation of religious women, the Oblates of the Assumption, to assist the Assumptionists in the foreign missions, especially in Eastern Europe. Meanwhile, he continued his efforts in France to promote freedom of exercise for private Catholic schools and dreamed of building a Catholic university. He opened a series of minor seminaries for students of limited financial means called alumnats.

In 1870, d'Alzon returned to Rome, where he fought for the declaration of the doctrine of papal infallibility. Throughout his life, he was an ardent and indefatigable supporter of the papacy, which he considered to be "the guarantor of Church unity". In Paris he established an organization, the Association of Our Lady of Salvation (Notre Dame de Salut), from which would spring two great Assumptionist fields of apostolic involvement:

1. large scale pilgrimages within France (e.g. Lourdes) and outside France (Rome and the Holy Land)
2. the Bonne Presse (now known as Bayard Presse), an influential publication house

He understood these latter endeavours to be "education in its various forms".

D'Alzon died in Nìmes. Pope John Paul II declared him "venerable" in 1991. Sometime after his death, a group of schools in France was named after him. Among them is a school in the southern France, in Vestric-et-Candiac, Occitania; the Institut Emmanuel D'Alzon, is attended by more than 500 students.

The library at Assumption University, Worcester, Massachusetts, is named after him.

== See also ==
- Listing of the works of Alexandre Falguière
