= Berteaucourt-lès-Thennes =

- Commune
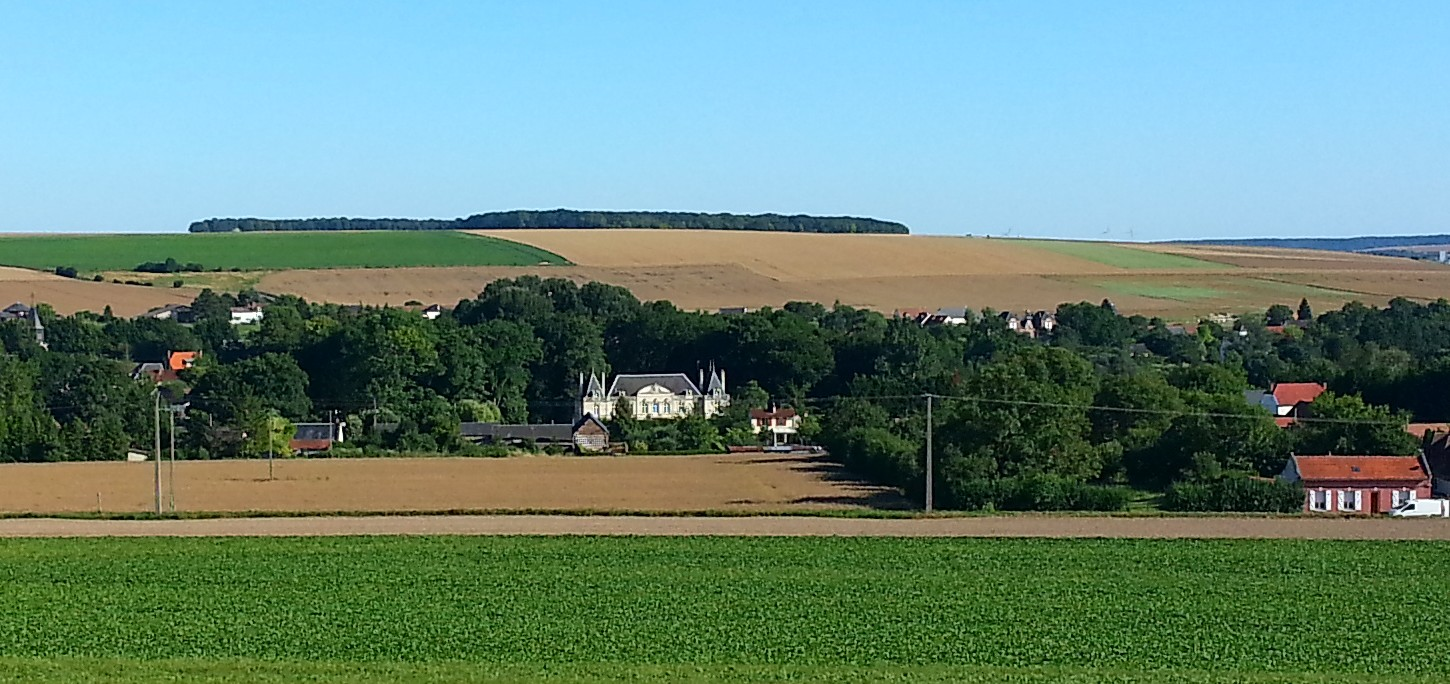
- A general view of Berteaucourt-les-Thennes
- Location of Berteaucourt-lès-Thennes
- Location within France Location within Hauts-de-France
- Coordinates: 49°48′50″N 2°27′55″E
- Country: France
- Region: Hauts-de-France
- Department: Somme
- Arrondissement: Montdidier
- Canton: Moreuil
- Intercommunality: CC Avre Luce Noye

Government
  - Mayor (2020–2026): Michel Boucher
- Area^{1}: 2.62 km^{2} (1.01 sq mi)
- Elevation: 41 m (135 ft)
- Highest elevation: 107 m (351 ft)
- Lowest elevation: 33 m (108 ft)
- Population (2023): 517
  - Density: 197/km^{2} (511/sq mi)
- Time zone: UTC+01:00 (CET)
  - Summer (DST): UTC+02:00 (CEST)
- INSEE/Postal code: 80094 /80110
- ^{1} French Land Register data, which excludes lakes, ponds, glaciers > 1 km^{2} (0.386 sq mi or 247 acres) and river estuaries.

Berteaucourt-lès-Thennes (French pronunciation: [bɛʁtokuʁ lɛ tɛn], literally Berteaucourt near Thennes; Picard: Bérteucourt-Teinne) is a commune in the Somme department in Hauts-de-France in northern France.

== Geography ==
The commune is situated on the D935 road, close to the banks of the Somme some 9 miles (14 km) southeast of Amiens. The soil around the town comprises alluvial deposits in the valley of the Luce, the small river that separates Berteaucourt from Thennes, red diluvium around the school and out towards Thézy-Glimont, chalk towards the slopes and Eocene clay on the higher ground.

== Population ==
Historical population
| Year | Pop. | ±% p.a. |
|---|---|---|
| 1968 | 291 | — |
| 1975 | 281 | −0.50% |
| 1982 | 356 | +3.44% |
| 1990 | 411 | +1.81% |
| 1999 | 431 | +0.53% |
| 2007 | 376 | −1.69% |
| 2012 | 445 | +3.43% |
| 2017 | 437 | −0.36% |
| 2023 | 517 | +2.84% |
Source: INSEE

== History ==
Being very close to the front line during much of World War I 1914–1918, the town was all but destroyed. Every building, as well as the cemetery, suffered a great deal of damage. The German attack of 21 March 1918 on the front line from Saint-Quentin to La Fère had succeeded in creating a pocket 80 kilometres (50 mi) deep into the combined British and French lines. General Seely set up his headquarters at Berteaucourt-lès-Thennes in March, 1918. On 8 August 1918 the French troops left Thennes and Berteaucourt-lès-Thennes, counter-attacking towards Villers-aux-Érables.

== See also ==
- Communes of the Somme department
