= La Croix (newspaper) =

French Catholic daily newspaper

- Front page of La Croix on 20 January 2016. The first edition to use the new orange logo and theme.
- Owner: Bayard Presse
- Founded: 1880; 146 years ago
- Political alignment: Catholic Church
- Language: French
- Headquarters: Paris, France
- Country: France
- Website: la-croix.com

La Croix (French pronunciation: [la kʁwa]; English: 'The Cross') is a French daily newspaper. It is a general-interest current affairs Catholic publication. It is based in Paris and distributed throughout France, with a circulation of 91,000 as of 2020.

La Croix is not explicitly left or right on major political issues, and adopts the Church's position, although it is not strictly a religious newspaper; its topics are of general interest, including world news, the economy, religion and spirituality, parenting, culture, and science.

== Early history ==
Upon its appearance in 1880, the first version of La Croix was a monthly news magazine. The Augustinians of the Assumption, who ran the paper, realised that the monthly format was not getting the widespread readership that the paper deserved. Therefore, the Augustinians of the Assumption, decided to convert to a daily sheet sold at one penny. Accordingly, La Croix transitioned into a daily newspaper on 16 June 1883. Father Emmanuel d'Alzon (1810–1880), the founder of the Assumptionists and the Oblates of the Assumption, started the paper. Also, La Croix's biggest early advocate was Father Vincent de Paul Bailly. La Bonne Presse was the first publishing house of the newspaper, which would be called Bayard Presse in 1950.

La Croix succeeded in bringing together certain groups of Catholics who were seeking to position themselves outside of party politics and official ideologies. At the end of the 19th century, it was the most widely read Catholic publication in France, with a clerical readership of more than 25,000. It gained more readers when it took the lead in attacking Dreyfus as a traitor and stirred up antisemitism. The Radical government, under Waldeck-Rousseau, forced the Assumptionists into exile from France. The newspaper's publishing house, la Bonne Presse, was purchased by Paul Féron-Vrau, who oversaw operations until the Assumptionists returned to France under the amnesty laws of 1905.

== Renewal ==
For many years, La Croix appeared in two formats. The first was a small-format periodical aimed at popular readership, the second a large-format newspaper aimed at a more intellectual audience. In 1927, Father Leon Merklen having become editor-in-chief, La Croix began to address social problems. This was led to the initiative founding Catholic Action and also helped to create a formal link between the Catholic Working Youth and the French Roman Catholic Church.

During the Second World War La Croix moved its editorial offices first to Bordeaux, then to Limoges. The paper was shut down comparatively late in the occupation, on 21 June 1944. It would not reappear until February 1945. Father Gabel oversaw the relaunch of the paper. Editor-in-chief from 1949, he introduced new sections, such as sports, cinema, fashion, and theatre. On 1 February 1956, La Croix began to appear for the first time without a crucifix as a part of its header. In March 1968, the newspaper adopted a tabloid format.

In January 1972, the newspaper changed its name to La Croix-l’Événement ("the Cross-the Event"). The choice of the new title was a reflection of the editorship's desire to show that the paper was not just a religious paper, but a regular daily, reflective of modern society. The paper has a very loyal readership: 87% of its sales are by subscription.

== Centennial ==
Logo until January 2016

To celebrate its centennial in 1983, la Croix-l’Événement took on a newer layout. The paper added new sections with the arrival of Noël Copin, editor-in-chief. The readership continued to decline, but the new team led by Bruno Frappat, former editing director of Le Monde who arrived in January 1995, hopes to fight against this trend of general disaffectation with the press which is plaguing a large number of French newspapers. (A regular printing in 1998 would be of about 127,000 copies).

Bayard Press is reacting to this with a double strategy. On the one hand, they are investing in the modernisation of La Croix, with electronic editing and a full electronic archive of the paper. On the other hand, they have increased their diversification, taking on a bigger presence in French children's press and adding new publications of a Catholic nature. They have also been involved in coproducing children's television and turning certain titles, such as Notre temps, into international publications.

The paper's efforts have met with some success and in 2005 reported a 1.55% increase in circulation. Today, La Croix is one of only three daily national French newspapers to turn a profit, and the most successful in growing its circulation in the 21st century. In 2019, the newspaper's circulation amounted to 87,682 copies. In 2020, the newspaper's circulation amounted to 86,440 copies.

Year	2009	2010	2011	2012	2013	2014	2015	2016	2017	2018	2019	2020
Circulation	95,130	94,439	93,586	94,122	94,673	93,149	92,280	91,467	89,558	87,260	87,682	86,440

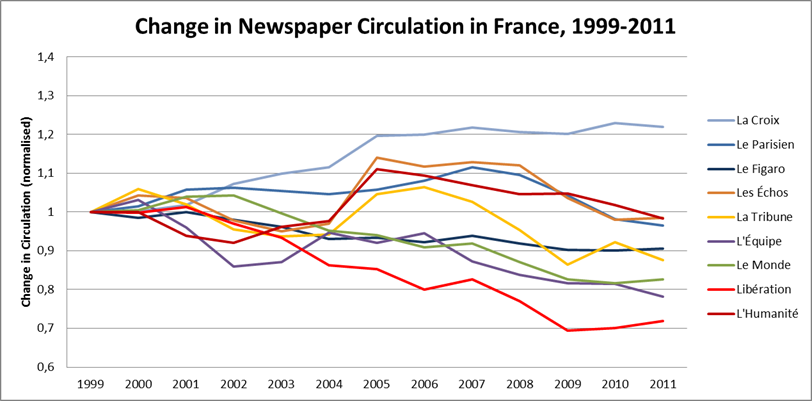

The editors of La Croix observed another centennial on 12 January 1998 (the publication of Émile Zola's J'accuse…!, the opening salvo in the public defense of Dreyfus) by examining the newspaper's role in the Dreyfus Affair. Whereas in 1898 they published "Down with the Jews!" and labeled Dreyfus as "the enemy Jew betraying France," the editors in 1998 stated "Whether Assumptionists or laymen, the editors of La Croix had at the time an inexcusable attitude."

== The Iraq War and the firing of Alain Hertoghe ==
In December 2003, the newspaper La Croix made headlines after firing one of its own journalists, Alain Hertoghe, for writing a book that was allegedly damaging to the newspaper's editorial line. Hertoghe accused the four major French newspapers—Le Monde, Le Figaro, Libération and Ouest-France—in addition to La Croix, of biased reporting during the U.S. war in Iraq.

== Bibliography ==
- Fleury, Alain (1986). « La Croix » et l'Allemagne. 1930–194086 (in French). Paris: Le Cerf.
