= Bayard Presse =

French publishing company

- Parent company: Augustinians of the Assumption
- Status: Active
- Founded: 1870
- Country of origin: France
- Distribution: France, Canada, U.S.
- Publication types: Books, magazines
- Official website: www.bayardpresse.com

Bayard Presse (French pronunciation: [bajaʁ pʁɛs]) is a French press and publishing companies, being founded in 1870. The company has various media outlets both in its native France and abroad. As of 2019, it reports approximately two thousand employees, two hundred magazines with five million subscribers, and eight million annual book sales.

== History and profile ==
Bayard Press was founded in Paris in 1870 and has since expanded into a global publishing network. Its core publications market comes from the children's sector. The main markets are France, Spain and China, but Bayard also has a substantial presence in Canada, Italy, the United Kingdom, and the United States. The company focuses on publications about youth, religion, seniors and nature.

The company has close connections with the Catholic Church in France, and is owned by the Assumptionists. It edits educational and Catholic publications such as La Croix and Catholic Digest. The latter was closed in summer 2020. It also publishes Notre Temps, a lifestyle magazine for seniors and The World of the Bible, a review of the Bible.

As well as being a French press company, Bayard Presse has publications in English such as the "I Love English" series for teenagers to read and practice their English. Since 1995, Bayard also produces children's magazines for English-speaking children, such as StoryBox (including the television/comic character "SamSam", for ages 3–6), AdventureBox (ages 6–9), and DiscoveryBox (ages 9–12). In addition to these its major English periodicals included Living with Christ, Catechist, and Today's Catholic Teacher. These titles were all shut down in 2020.
