= Assumptionists =

Global congregation of Catholic priests

- Congregation of the Augustinians of the Assumption
- Congregatio Augustinianorum ab Assumptione
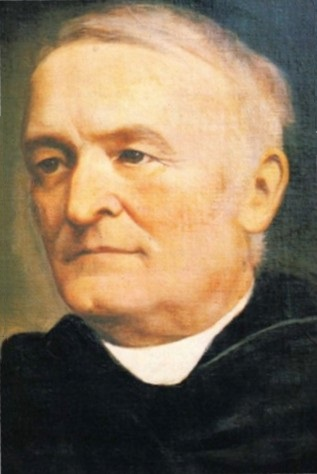
- Emmanuel d'Alzon
- Abbreviation: AA
- Formation: 1845 (181 years ago)
- Founder: Emmanuel d'Alzon
- Founded at: Nimes, France
- Type: Clerical religious congregation of pontifical right (for men)
- Headquarters: Rome, Italy
- Members: 940 members (529 priests) (2018)
- Superior General: Ngoya Ya Tsihemba
- Affiliations: Roman Catholic Church
- Website: assumptio.org

The Assumptionists, formally known as the Congregation of the Augustinians of the Assumption (Latin: Congregatio Augustinianorum ab Assumptione; abbreviated AA), is a worldwide congregation of Catholic priests and brothers. It is active in many countries. The French branch played a major role in French political and social history in the 19th century.

== Founder ==
Born in Le Vigan on August 30, 1810, Emmanuel d'Alzon received his initial formation in the major seminary of Montpellier (1832–1833) which he completed in Rome. A student of Félicité de Lamennais, he broke with his former mentor but remained influenced by several of his ideas. He launched numerous pastoral initiatives in the diocese of Nîmes under successive bishops: Claude Petit Benoit de Chaffoy (1822–1835), Jean-François-Marie Cart (1837–1855), Claude-Henri Plantier (1855–1875), and François-Nicolas Besson (1875–1878). D'Alzon founded two congregations, one for men (the Assumptionists) and one for women (the Oblates of the Assumption).

D'Alzon resigned from his post as vicar general in 1878 after 43 years of service. With his first disciples he undertook goals including foreign missions (Australia, eastern Europe), education, the press, and pilgrimages. He died on November 21, 1880, in Nîmes and was declared Venerable by Pope John Paul II in December 1991.

== Assumptionists/Augustinians of the Assumption ==
The congregation had its origin in the College of the Assumption, established in Nîmes, France, in 1843, by d'Alzon, vicar-general of that diocese. Organized in 1847, the members took their public vows at Christmas of the next year. A second house was established in Paris, and they continued their work there. The congregation was formally approved by a Brief of 26 November 1864. The chief objects of the congregation are to combat the spirit of irreligion in Europe and the spread of schism in the East. To this end the Assumptionists worked in Catholic higher and secondary education, the press, the conduct of pilgrimages, and missionary work in the East. In addition to their college at Nîmes they established Apostolic schools where poor students were educated for the priesthood without expense to themselves.

In the 1870s, the Assumptionists established "La Bonne Presse" which issued periodicals, pamphlets, and books in great numbers and expanded into one of the largest Catholic publishing houses in the world, Bayard Presse. They founded one of the oldest and most influential daily newspapers in France, La Croix. In English-speaking countries its best known publication is Catholic Digest.

In 1873 these religious also began a series of large-scale pilgrimages both within France and to the Holy Land which developed into such current endeavors as the popular national pilgrimage to Lourdes every year on the occasion of the feast of the Assumption, gathering thousands of pilgrims.

Their activities at the time of the Dreyfus Case aroused controversy. The Assumptionists actively promoted the conspiracy theory that unnamed Jews were destroying French institutions, in particular the Army and the Catholic church, and oppressing the people. One of example of this anti-Semitic polemic can be taken from their daily newspaper, La Croix, for 2 February 1898:

Chaque semaine, les Juifs, qui emploient le fisc à cette triste besogne, se ruent sur les biens de gens désarmés; on vole, au nom de la secte, le pain des pauvres; ça et là, des misérables consentent à acheter à bas prix les immeubles sous la direction occulte du syndicat juif (each week, the Jews, who exploit tax law in this sorry task, seize the goods of defenceless people; in the name of their sect, the bread of the poor is stolen; here and there, wretched people agree to buy buildings at knockdown prices under the secret instruction of organized Jewry).

When the Republican party came to power, it required religious orders to be reorganized and registered. Some organizations, including the Assumptionists, refused and went into exile instead. In 1900 the congregation was suppressed within French territory, this action being based on the charge that they were accumulating a fund to be used in a royalist movement to overthrow the Republic. Many priests went abroad; other remained in France as secular priests under the authority of local bishops.

At the time of their suppression the Assumptionists maintained twenty Apostolic schools which were all closed. The congregation then took up the work in other quarters. Similar schools were established in Italy, Belgium, England, and the United States. "La Bonne Presse" was purchased at the time of the suppression by Paul Feron-Vrau, a wealthy manufacturer of Lisle, and all its publications were continued without any change. In Chile, they published in Spanish "Echoes from the Sanctuary of Lourdes". In their journalistic work they were aided by the Oblate Sisters of the Assumption, an order established by d'Alzon to assist in their Oriental missions, but whose activities are not contained to that field. Until the suppression they directed the women's section in the publishing rooms of the "Christian Press" as well as the hospitals, orphan asylums, and schools.

Prior to their suppression the Assumptionists in France also led the "Association of Our Lady of Salvation", a society devoted to prayer, almsgiving, and setting a good example for the reformation of the working class. This society was established in eighty dioceses, and it succeeded in drawing the higher classes of society more closely to the workingmen. It encouraged social prayer and social and national expiation, and discouraged human respect, social apostasy, and isolation in piety. It raised funds to convey workmen, pilgrims, paupers, and sick poor to Lourdes to the number of a thousand each year; promoted the cause of workmen's clubs and of Catholic Schools, and was active in the movement in favour of the keeping of Sunday as a day of rest.

The Assumptionists also worked among the Newfoundland fishermen. Every year 12,000 or 15,000 fishermen left the coasts of France, Belgium, and Ireland, to go to the Banks of Newfoundland for codfish. The Assumptionists organized prominent catholic sailors into a committee and were encouraged to equip two hospital ships to aid the fishermen. The vessels were wrecked twice, but replaced.

In 1925, the Assumptionists absorbed the English branch of the Fathers of St. Edmund, also known as the Oblates of the Sacred Heart of Jesus and of the Immaculate Heart of Mary, founded in 1843 by Dom Muard.

On 11 November 1952 at the central prison of Sofia, Bulgaria three Assumptionist priests (Augustinians of the Assumption), Kamen Vitchev, Pavel Djidjov and Josaphat Chichov were executed by firing squad by the Communist regime. All three have since been beatified as martyrs for the faith.

== Present day ==
The current Rule of Life of the congregation draws its inspiration from that of Augustine of Hippo. This international congregation is present in nearly 30 countries throughout the world, with the most recent foundations being established in 2006 in the Philippines, Vietnam, and Togo.

At the General Chapter of 2011, a French priest Benoit Griere, was elected on 11 May to succeed Father Richard Lamoureaux- who had served the maximum of two successive six-year terms-as the 10th superior general. The religious institute's new superior general, a physician, theologian, and ethicist, was born in 1958 in Chauny, France. He studied medicine in Reims, France, and simultaneously began his formation as a candidate for the Assumptionist priesthood in seminary, studying philosophy and sacred theology. He entered the Assumptionists in 1991 and was ordained to the priesthood in 1995. According to the 2012 Annuario Pontificio, the Augustinians of the Assumption number 882 religious, of whom 541 are priests, in 125 communities.

== The Assumption family ==
The Assumption family consists of five congregations with direct roots to either Father Emmanuel d'Alzon or Saint Marie-Eugénie de Jésus.

In a booklet, entitled, "Origins of the Religious Families of the Assumption," Pierre Touveneraud (1926–1979), former general archivist of the congregation, summarized in 1972 the common patrimony of the original branches of the Assumption. Some of the traits they share are: an Augustinian spirituality, Christocentrism (special emphasis on the mystical Incarnation and the Kingdom of God), love of the Church and the centrality of the Eucharist, love of Mary, strong common life, common prayer, the role of study.

=== Religious of the Assumption ===
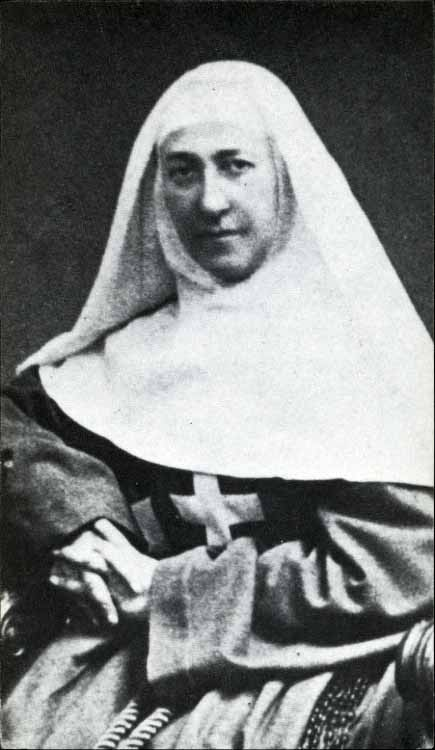
Marie Eugénie de Jésus Milleret de Brou

The Religious of the Assumption (R.A.) were founded in April 1839 in Paris by Anne-Eugénie Milleret de Brou, known in religion as Mother Marie-Eugénie de Jésus (1817-1898).

After living a profound spiritual experience at the age of 19 at Notre Dame de Paris, the young Anne-Eugénie encountered a certain Father Combalot and, under his inspiration, founded a religious congregation dedicated to the transformation of society through education. In 1841, Emmanuel d'Alzon became her spiritual guide; this relation then developed into a rich friendship that would last until his death in 1880.

The mother-house and the Sanctuary of Saint Marie-Eugénie are located in Paris, at 17 rue de l'Assomption (16th arrondissement).

- The Missionary Sisters of the Assumption (M.S.A.) were founded in 1853 in Grahamstown, South Africa as a result of a split with the Religious of the Assumption. The original mother-house was located in Grahamstown, but was later transferred to Johannesburg. They are in South Africa and in Ireland, and focus on education, pastoral care, and assisting vulnerable populations.

=== Augustinians of the Assumption ===
The Augustinians of the Assumption (A.A.), known as the Assumptionists, were founded by Emmanuel d'Alzon in Nîmes in 1845.

=== Oblate Sisters of the Assumption ===
The Oblate Sisters of the Assumption (O.A.) were founded in May 1865 in Rochebelle, near Le Vigan, Gard by Emmanuel d'Alzon and Marie Correnson, known in religion as Mother Emmanuel-Marie de la Compassion (1842-1900). A missionary congregation, they focus on Christian unity.

=== Little Sisters of the Assumption ===
The Little Sisters of the Assumption (P.S.A.) were founded in July 1865 in Paris by the Assumptionist priest Etienne Pernet (1824–1899) and Antoinette Fage, known in religion as Mother Marie de Jésus (1824–1883). The congregation, from its foundation, has been dedicated to the home care of the sick poor.

- The Sisters of Charity of the Assumption (S.C.A) were founded as a result of a split with the Little Sisters of the Assumption in Italy in 1993. They are associated with the Comunione e Liberazione Movement.

=== Orantes of the Assumption ===
The Orantes of the Assumption (Or. A.) were founded in 1896 in Paris by the Assumptionist priest François Picard (1831–1903) and Isabelle de Clermont-Tonnerre, known in religion as Mother Isabelle of Gethsemani (1849-1921). The sole purely contemplative branch of the Assumption family, they are dedicated to praying and interceding for the works of the Assumption.

In 1941, they incorporated the Sacramentine Sisters of Marseille, founded in 1639 by Antoine Le Quien.

== Twentieth-century foundations ==
Other foundations of the Assumption Family took place in the 20th century and not all of them bear the name "Assumption" even if they owe their origin to an Assumptionist.

- The Sisters of St. Joan of Arc (S.J.A.) were founded in 1914 in Worcester, Massachusetts (US) by Marie-Clément Staub and Sr. Jeanne du Sacre Coeur, born Célina Benoît. (1876–1936). The mother-house was established in Sillery, Québec in 1917.
- The Servas Obreras Catequistas (S.O.C.) were founded in Argentina by Joseph-Marie Moreau (1897–1947) in 1934.
- The Sisters of the Cross were founded in Athens in 1939. Their mother-house is located on Ipirou Street Agia Paraskevi. This congregation was founded by Elpide Iannis Stephanou (1896–1978).
- The Brothers of the Assumption were founded in 1951 in Beni (Democratic Republic of the Congo) by Bishop Henri Piérard (1893–1975), as a lay diocesan institute for the diocese of Beni-Butembo. It has remained a small congregation.
- The Little Sisters of the Presentation of Our Lady were founded in 1948 also by Bishop Piérard as a diocesan institute. Its mother-house is now located in Butembo, North Kivu (DRC).
- The Little Missionaries of the Cross were founded in Bogotá in 1955. They later became and remain a secular institute with no particular link to the Assumptionists.
