= List of religious institutes =

The following is a list of current Catholic religious institutes. Most are Latin Catholic; however, Eastern Catholic institutes are also included.

The list given here includes not only examples of pontifical right institutes but also some that are only of diocesan right. It includes even some associations formed with a view to becoming religious institutes but not yet canonically erected even on the diocesan level.

The list does not distinguish between institutes that historically would be classified either as "orders" or as "congregations".

Institutes are listed alphabetically by their common names, not their official ones. For example, the Jesuits, officially called the Society of Jesus, would be listed under 'J' rather than under 'S.' If an institute's official name is used more often than a nickname, it is as such.

== List ==
Name	Post- nominals	Founder	Family	Year founded
Adorers of the Blood of Christ	A.S.C.	St. Maria De Mattias	Augustinian	1834
Adrian Dominican Sisters (Congregation of the Most Holy Rosary)	O.P.	Mother Camilla Madden	Dominican	1880
Affiliated Christian Brothers	A.F.S.C.			
Association of Pauline Cooperators			Pauline	1918
Agnesian Sisters (Congregation of Sisters of St. Agnes)	C.S.A.	Fr. Kaspar Rehrl		1858
Alagad ni Maria (Disciples of Mary)	A.M.	Julio Xavier Labayen		1990
Albertine Brothers	C.F.A.P.U.	St. Albert Chmielowski	Franciscan	1888
Albertine Sisters	C.S.A.P.U.	St. Albert Chmielowski	Franciscan	1891
Alexian Brothers	C.F.A.	Fr. Dominicus Brock	Augustinian	1469
Alliance of the Hearts of Jesus and Mary	A.S.M.			
American-Cassinese Benedictine Congregation	O.S.B.	Abbot Boniface Wimmer	Benedictine	1855
Amigonian Friars	T.C.	José María Amigó y Ferrer	Capuchin	1889
Angelic Sisters of St. Paul	A.S.S.P.	St. Anthony Maria Zaccaria	Barnabite	1535
Antonian Order of Saint Ormizda of the Chaldeans	O.A.O.C.		Chaldean Catholic	1808
Antonin Maronite Order	O.A.M.		Maronites	1700
Apostles of Jesus Missionaries	A.J	Founded by Bishop Sixtus Mazzoldi, MCCJ and Rev. John Marengoni, MCCJ in Moroto, Uganda, East Africa, on August 22, 1968	Apostles of Jesus	1968
Apostles of the Sacred Heart of Jesus	A.S.C.J.	Blessed Clelia Merloni		1894
Ar-Rouhbanyat Al-Marounyat Liltoubawyat Mariam Al-Azra	O.M.M.			
Armenian Sisters of the Immaculate Conception	R.I.C.	Archbishop Andon Hassounian		1847
Arrouhbaniat Albassiliat Almoukhalissiat	B.S.			
Assisi Sisters of Mary Immaculate	A.S.M.I.		Franciscan	1949
Assumptionists (Augustinians of the Assumption)	A.A.	Fr. Emmanuel d'Alzon	Augustinian	1845
Augustinian Missionary Sisters	A.M.S.		Augustinian	
Augustinian Sisters, Servants of Jesus and Mary	A.S.J.M.	Mother Maria Teresa Spinelli	Augustinian	1827
Austrian Cistercian Congregation	O.S.B.		Benedictine	
Austrian Congregation of Canons Regular			Augustinian	
Austrian Congregation	O.S.B.	Pope Urban VIII	Benedictine	1625
B
Basilian Chouerite Order of Saint John the Baptist	B.C.	Neophytos Nasri	Melkite Greek Catholic	1696
Bavarian Congregation	O.S.B.	Pope Pius IX	Benedictine	1684
Benedictine Oblates of St Scholastica	O.S.B.		Benedictine	1984
Benedictine Sisters of Divine Providence	B.D.P.		Benedictine	
Benedictine Sisters of Our Lady of Grace and Compassion	O.S.B.		Benedictine	
Benedictine Sisters of Perpetual Adoration	O.S.B;	Mother Mary Anselma Felber	Benedictine	1874
Benedictine Sisters of St. Lioba	O.S.B.		Benedictine	
Benedictines of Mary, Queen of Apostles	O.S.F.	Priestly Fraternity of St. Peter	Benedictine	1995
Bernardine Cistercians of Esquermes		Mother Hippolyte Lecouvreur	Benedictine	1827
Bernardine Sisters of St. Francis		Mother Veronica Grzedowska	Franciscan	1894
Bethlehemite Brothers	O.F.B.	St. Peter of Saint Joseph de Betancur		1653 (restored 1984)
Beuronese Congregation	O.S.B.	Fr. Maurus Wolter; Fr. Placidus Wolter	Benedictine	1863
Bon Secours Sisters	C.B.S.	Archbishop Hyacinthe-Louis de Quélen		1824
Brazilian Cistercian Congregation			Benedictine	1961
Brazilian Congregation	O.S.B.		Benedictine	1827
Brigidine Sisters	C.S.B.	Daniel Delany		1807
Brigittine Monks	O.Ss.S.			
Brothers and Sisters of Penance of St. Francis			Franciscan	1996
Brothers Hospitallers of St. John of God	O.H.	St. John of God		1572
Brothers of Charity	F.C.	Canon Petrus Joseph Triest	Vincentians	1807
Brothers of Christian Instruction (De la Mennais Brothers, FIC Brothers)	F.I.C.	Gabriel Deshayes & Jean-Marie de Lamennais		1819
Brothers of Christian Instruction of St Gabriel (Gabrielite Brothers)	S.G.; F.S.G.	St. Louis de Montfort & Fr. Gabriel Deshayes	Montfortian	1711
Brothers of Divine Providence	F.D.P.			
Brothers of Mercy of Our Lady of Perpetual Help	F.M.M.	Canon J. B. Cornelius Scheppers		1839
Brothers of Our Lady Mother of Mercy	C.M.M.			1844
Brothers of Our Lady of the Holy Rosary	F.S.R.			
Brothers of St. Charles Lwanga (Bannakaroli Brothers)	B.S.C.L	Bishop Henri Streicher, M.Afr.		1927
Brothers of the Assumption			Augustinian	
Brothers of the Holy Family of Belley	F.S.F.			
Brothers of the Holy Infancy		Bishop John Timon		1853
Brothers of the Immaculate Conception of Maastricht	F.I.C.	Fr. Bernard Hoecken, Fr. Louis Rutten		1867
Brothers of the Sacred Heart	S.C.	Fr. André Coindre		1821
Byzantine Discalced Carmelites of Lebanon		Archbishop Philip Nabaa	Eastern Catholic, Carmelite	1962
C
Camaldolese Hermits of the Congregation of Monte Corona	Er. Cam.	Fr. Paul Giustiniani	Benedictine	1525
Camaldolese	E.C.	St. Romuald	Benedictine	1025
Camaldolese Congregation of the Order of St. Benedict	O.S.B. Cam.		Benedictine	
Camillian Fathers (Clerics Regular, Ministers to the Sick)	M.I.; O.S. Cam.	St. Camillus de Lellis	Camillian	1582
Canonesses Regular of St. Augustine	C.R.O.S.A.		Augustinians	
Canonesses Regular of the Holy Sepulchre	C.R.S.S.			
Canonesses of St. Augustine of the Mercy of Jesus	O.S.A.		Augustinian	13th century
Canons Regular of St. John Cantius	S.J.C.	Fr. C. Frank Phillips, C.R.	Augustinian	1998
Canons Regular of St. Victor			Augustinian	1968
Canons Regular of the Hospitalary Congregation of Great St. Bernard			Augustinian	11th century
Canons Regular of the Immaculate Conception	C.R.I.C.	Adrien Gréa	Augustinian	1871
Canons Regular of the Lateran	C.R.L.	St. Martin of Tours	Augustinian	4th century
Canons Regular of the New Jerusalem	C.R.N.J.	Bishop Raymond Leo Burke; Dom Daniel Augustine Oppenheimer	Augustinian	2002
Crosiers (Canons Regular of the Order of the Holy Cross)	O.S.C.	Theodorus de Cellis		Late 12th century
Canons Regular of the Swiss Congregation of Saint-Maurice of Agaune		Holy Roman Emperor Sigismund	Augustinian	515
Canossian Fathers (Canossian Sons of Charity)	F.d.C.C.	St. Magdalene of Canossa, Fr. Francesco Luzzi	Canossian	1831
Canossian Sisters (Canossian Daughters of Charity, Servants of the Poor)	F.D.D.C.	St. Magdalene of Canossa	Canossian	1808
Capuchin Poor Clares	O.S.C. Cap.; P.C. Cap.	Ven. Maria Laurentia Longo	Franciscan	1538
Capuchin Sisters of Nazareth	C.N.		Franciscan	
Carmelite Daughters of the Divine Heart of Jesus	D.J.C.	Mother Anna Maria Tauscher	Carmelites	1891
Carmelite Sisters Of St. Teresa	C.S.S.T.		Carmelite	1887
Carmelite Sisters for the Aged and Infirm	O. Carm.	Mother Mary Angeline Teresa McCrory	Carmelite	1929
Carmelite Sisters of Charity (Vedruna), India	C.C.V.		Carmelite	1826
Carmelite Sisters of Charity	C.C.V. or C. a Ch.	Joaquina Vedruna de Mas	Carmelite	1826
Carmelite Sisters of Jesus, Mary, Joseph, Kuala Lumpur		Archbishop Dominic Vendargon; Fr. Pierluigi	Carmelite	1982
Carmelite Sisters of Sacred Heart of Jesus, Miri		Bishop Anthony Galvin; Bishop Anthony Lee; Mother Margarita of Jesus	Carmelite	1986
Carmelite Sisters of St. Therese	C.S.T.		Carmelite	
Carmelite Sisters of the Divine Heart of Jesus	D.C.J.		Carmelite	
Carmelite Sisters of the Immaculate Heart of Mary, Kuching		Msgr. Aloysius Hopfgartner; Mother Margaret Mary of Jesus	Carmelite	1948
Carmelite Sisters of the Most Sacred Heart of Los Angeles		Ven. Maria Luisa Josefa	Carmelite	1904
Carmelite Sisters of the Sacred Hearts			Carmelite	1987
Carmelite Sisters of Our Lady of Mount Carmel and St. Thérèse of the Child Jesus, Kota Kinabalu		Msgr. August Wachter; Mother Josephine Mary	Carmelite	1930
Carmelites of Mary Immaculate	C.M.I.	Fr. Palackal Thoma; Fr. Porukara Thoma Kathanar; Fr. Kuriakose Elias Chavara	Carmelite	1831
Carmelites of St. Elijah	C.S.E.		Carmelite	1986
Carmelites (Order of the Brothers of the Blessed Virgin Mary of Mount Carmel)	O. Carm.	St. Berthold of Calabria	Carmelite	12th century
Carthusian Order (Order of St. Bruno)	O. Cart.	St. Bruno of Cologne	Carthusian	1084
Casamari Cistercian Congregation			Benedictine	1929
Castilian Cistercian Congregation			Benedictine	1425
Catechist Sisters of St. Ann (India)	C.S.A.			
Catholic Foreign Mission Society of America see Maryknoll				
Christian Doctrine Fathers (Doctrinaries)	D.C.	Blessed Fr. César de Bus		1592
CICM Missionaries (Congregation of the Immaculate Heart of Mary)	C.I.C.M.	Fr. Theophiel Verbist		1862
Cistercian Congregation of Mary Mediatrix			Benedictine	1846
Cistercian Congregation of Mary, Queen of the World			Benedictine	1953
Cistercian Congregation of St. Bernard in Italy			Benedictine	1497
Cistercian Congregation of the Crown of Aragon			Benedictine	1616
Cistercian Congregation of the Holy Family			Benedictine	1964
Cistercian Congregation of the Immaculate Conception			Benedictine	1867
Cistercian Congregation of the Immaculate Heart of Mary			Benedictine	1923
Cistercian Order of the Holy Cross	O.C.C.O.		Benedictine	
Cistercians of the Common Observance	S.O.Cist.			
Cistercian Order	O.Cist.	St. Robert of Molesme	Benedictine	1098
Claretian Sisters (Religious of Mary Immaculate Claretian Missionary Sisters)	C.S.	St. Anthony Mary Claret	Claretian	1855
Claretians (Congregation of Missionaries, Sons of the Immaculate Heart of the Blessed Virgin Mary)	C.M.F.	St. Anthony Mary Claret	Claretian	1849
Clarissan Missionaries of the Blessed Sacrament, India	C.S.B.S.			
Clarist Franciscan Missionaries of the Most Blessed Sacrament (India)	C.F.M.S.S.		Franciscan	
Clerics Regular Minor (Adorno Fathers)	C.R.M.	St. Francis Caracciolo	Augustinian	1558
Clerics Regular of St. Paul	C.R.S.P.	St. Anthony Maria Zaccaria	Barnabite	1530
Colettine Poor Clares	P.C.C.	St. Colette of Corbie	Franciscans	1211
Comboni Missionaries	M.C.C.I.	St. Daniel Comboni		1867
Community of Betania		Maria Esperanza		1979
Community of Jesus		Cay Andersen; Judy Sorensen	Benedictine	1968
Community of St. John	C.S.J.	Fr. Marie-Dominique Philippe		1975
Company of Mary Our Lady	O.D.N.	St. Jeanne de Lestonnac		1607
Company of Our Lady of the Blessed Sacrament	F.C.S.			
Congregartion of the Sons of the Immaculate Conception, India	C.F.I.C.			
Congregation of the Disciples of the Lord	C.D.D.	Bishop Celso Costantini		1931
Congregation of Carmelite Religious	C.C.R.			
Congregation of Christian Brothers (Irish Christian Brothers)	C.F.C.	Blessed Edmund Ignatius Rice		1802
Congregation of Christian Retreat		Fr. Antoine-Sylvestre Receveur		1789
Congregation of Christian Workers of St. Joseph Calasanz	C.Op.			1889
Congregation of Clerics Regular (Theatines)	C.R.	St. Cajetan		1524
Congregation of Divine Providence (Germany)		Bishop Wilhelm Emmanuel von Ketteler	Divine Providence	1851
Congregation of Divine Providence (Sisters of Divine Providence)	C.D.P.	Blessed Jean-Martin Moye	Divine Providence	1827
Congregation of Franciscans of the Immaculate Conception	C.F.I.C.			
Congregation of Holy Cross (Holy Cross Fathers)	C.S.C.	Blessed Basil Moreau	Holy Cross	1837
Congregation of Holy Family, India	C.H.F.	Blessed Mariam Thresia		1914
Congregation of Jesus and Mary (Eudists)	C.I.M.; C.J.M.	Fr. John Eudes		1643
Congregation of Jesus, India	C.J.			
Congregation of Missionaries of the Holy Family	M.S.F.			
Congregation of Missionary Servants of the Most Holy Trinity	M.SS.S.T.			
Congregation of the Missionary Sisters of Saint Charles Borromeo (Scalabrinian Sisters)	C.S.	Blessed Giovanni Battista Scalabrini	Scalabrinian	1895
Congregation of Monks Studitas of Ukraine	M.S.U.			
Congregation of Mary Immaculate Queen	C.M.R.I	Francis Schuckardt		1967
Congregation of the Mother of Carmel	C.M.C.	St. Kuriakose Elias Chavara	Carmelite	1866
Congregation of Mother of Divine Love	C.M.D.A.			
Congregation of Nazareth Sisters, India	C.N.S.			
Congregation of Notre Dame of Montreal	C.N.D.	St. Marguerite Bourgeoys		1653
Congregation of Our Lady of Calvary		François Leclerc du Tremblay, OFM Cap	Benedictines	1617
Congregation of Our Lady of Pity	C.L.P.			
Congregation of Our Lady of Sion	N.D.S.	Fr. Marie Theodor Ratisbonne; Fr. Marie-Alphonse Ratisbonne		1852
Congregation of Our Lady of the Missions	R.N.D.M.	Mother Adèle Euphrasie Barbier	Augustinian	1861
Congregation of St. Thérèse of Lisieux	C.S.T.	Metropolitan Mar Augustine Kandathil		1931; 1945
Congregation of Samaritan Sisters, India	C.S.S.			
Congregation of the School Sisters of Notre Dame		Peter Fourier, Alexia le Clerc, Gabriel Schneider		
Congregation of Servants of Holy Infancy Jesus	O.S.F.			
Congregation of Sons of Mary Immaculate (Chavagne Fathers)	F.M.I.			
Congregation of Sons of Mary Immaculate	F.S.M.I.			
Congregation of St. Basil	C.S.B.	Fr. Joseph Lapierre	Basilian	1822
Congregation of St. John	F.J.			
Congregation of St. Michael the Archangel	C.S.M.A.			
Congregation of Windesheim		Fr. Geert Groote; Florens Radewyns	Augustinian	1386
Congregation of the Annunciation	B.M.V.	Abbot Columba Marmion	Benedictine	1920
Congregation of the Brothers of the Blessed Sacrament	CFSsS	Václav Klement Petr		1888
Congregation of the Blessed Sacrament	S.S.S.	St. Peter Julian Eymard	Eymardian	1659
Congregation of the Clerics Regular of Saint Augustine	C.C.R.S.A.			
Congregation of the Companions of St. Angela	C.S.A.			
Congregation of the Divine Spirit	C.D.S.	Archbishop John Mark Gannon		1956
Congregation of the Holy Spirit (Holy Ghost Fathers, Spiritans)	C.S.Sp.	Fr. Claude Poullart des Places		1703
Congregation of the Immaculate Congregation, India	C.I.C.			
Congregation of the Lebanese Maronite Missionaries	M.L.			1865
Congregation of the Mother of the Redeemer (Vietnam)	C.R.M.	Fr. Dominic Maria Trần Đình Thủ		1952
Congregation of the Oblates to Divine Love		Mother Margherita Diomira Crispi		
Congregation of the Rosarians, India	C.R.			1928
Congregation of the Sacred Hearts of Jesus and Mary	SS.CC.	Fr. Pierre Coudrin		1800
Congregation of the Sisters of Charity, India	C.S.C.			
Congregation of the Sisters of Christian Schools	S.S.C.			
Congregation of the Sisters of Mercy	R.S.M.		Sisters of Mercy	1991
Congregation of the Sisters of Nazareth	C.S.N.	Victoire Larmenier		1857
Congregation of the Sisters of Nazareth, India	C.S.N.			
Congregation of the Sisters of Our Lady of Mercy	O.L.M.	Mother Teresa Eva Potocka		1862
Congregation of the Sisters of Our Lady of Mercy (Divine Mercy Sisters)	O.L.M.	Mother Teresa Eva Potocka		1862
Congregation of the Sisters of St. Aloysius, India	O.S.L.			
Congregation of the Sisters of St. Elizabeth, India	C.S.S.E.			
Congregation of the Sisters of St. Felix of Cantalice (Felician Sisters)	C.S.S.F.	Sophia Truszkowska		1855
Congregation of the Sisters of the Blessed Sacrament		Marie Magdaléna Šebestová		1887
Congregation of the Sisters of the Blessed Sacrament and Our Lady	C.B.S.			
Congregation of the Sisters of the Resurrection	C.R.	Celine Borzecka; Hedwig Borzecka		1891
Congregazione dei Preti della Dottrina Cristiana (Concezionisti)	C.F.I.C.			
Congrégation des Soeurs de Saint-Martin	S.M.			
Congrégation du Sacré-Coeur (Pères de Timon David)	S.C.J.			
Cono-Sur Congregation	O.S.B.		Benedictines	1976
Consolata Missionaries	I.M.C.	Giuseppe Allamano		1901
Cordi Marian Sisters	M.C.M.			
Crusade of the Holy Spirit	C.H.S.			
D
Daughters of Charity of the Most Precious Blood, India	D.C.P.B.			
Daughters of Charity of the Sacred Heart of Jesus	F.C.S.C.J.			
Daughters of Divine Charity	F.D.C.	Mother Franziska Lechner		1868
Daughters of Divine Love	D.D.L.	Bishop Godfrey Mary Paul Okoye		1969
Daughters of Divine Providence	F.D.P.			
Daughters Of Divine Providence, India	D.D.P.			
Daughters of Divine Zeal	F.D.Z.	St. Annibale Maria di Francia		1887
Daughters of Jesus (Spain)	F.I.	St. Saint Candida Maria of Jesus		1871
Daughters of Jesus (France)		Abbot Pierre Noury		1834
Daughters of Mary Immaculate (Dimesse Sisters), India	D.M.I.			
Daughters of Mary and Joseph (Formerly knows as Ladies of Mary)	D.M.J.			
Daughters of Mary of the Immaculate Conception	D.M.	Msgr. Lucian Bojnowski		1904
Daughters of Mary, Mother of Healing Love	D.M.M.L.	Mother Paul Marie		2003
Daughters of Mary	D.M.	Msgr. Joseph Kuzhinjalil		1938
Daughters of Nazareth	D.N.			
Daughters of Our Lady of Compassion	D.O.L.C.	Mother Suzanne Aubert		1892
Daughters of Our Lady of Mercy, India	F.D.M.			
Daughters of Our Lady of Mercy		St. Maria Giuseppa Rossello		1837
Daughters of Our Lady of the Garden	O.L.G.	St. Anthony Gianelli	Gianelli	1829
Daughters of Our Lady of the Sacred Heart	F.D.N.S.C.			
Daughters of Our Lady of the Sacred Heart	O.L.S.H.			
Daughters of Presentation of Mary in the Temple, India	D.P.M.			
Daughters of Providence, St. Brieuc	D.P.			
Daughters of Saint Mary of Providence	F.S.M.P.	Dina Bosatta, Luigi Guanella		1872
Daughters of St. Ann	D.S.A.			
Daughters of St. Anne of Calcutta	D.S.A.			
Daughters of St. Anne of Ranchi	D.S.A.			
Daughters of St. Camillus	D.S.C.		Camillian	
Daughters of St. Francis de Sales	D.S.F.S.		Salesian	
Daughters of St. Francis of Assisi	D.S.F.A.		Franciscan	1894
Daughters of St. Joseph	D.S.J.			
Daughters of St. Mary of Leuca, India	D.M.L.			
Daughters of St. Mary of Providence (Guanellian Sisters)	D.S.M.P.			
Daughters of St. Paul (Pauline Sisters)	F.S.P.	Blessed James Alberione; Ven. Mother Thecla Merlo	Pauline	1915
Daughters of St. Thomas	D.S.T.			
Daughters of Wisdom	D.W.	St. Louis de Montfort; Blessed Marie Louise Trichet	Montfortians	1707
Daughters of the Church	D.C.; E.F.			
Daughters of the Cross of Liege	F.C.			
Daughters of the Cross	F.D.L.C.			
Daughters of the Heart of Mary	D.H.M.			
Daughters of the Holy Cross, Sisters of St. Andrew		Andrew Fournet; Joan Elizabeth Bichier des Ages		1807
Daughters of the Holy Spirit		Ven. Félix de Jesús Rougier	Felixian	1924
Daughters of the Holy Spirit (White Sisters)	D.H.S.	Sr. Marie Belavenne; Se. Renée Burel		1706
Daughters of the Immaculate Heart of Mary	D.I.H.M.			
Daughters of the Oratory	F.d.O.	Vincenzo Grossi		1885
Daughters of the Sacred Heart of Jesus	D.S.H.J.			
Daughters of the Sacred Heart of Jesus	F.S.C.G.	Ignazia Verzeri		1831
Daughters of the Sacred Heart	D.S.H.			
De La Salle Brothers	F.S.C.	St. Jean-Baptiste de La Salle	Lasallian	1680
Deen Bandhu Samaj (India)	D.B.S.			
Dina Sevana Sabha (Servants of the Poor)	D.S.S.			
Discalced Augustinians	O.A.D.		Augustinian	1592
Discalced Carmelites (Barefoot Carmelites)	O.C.D.	St. Teresa of Ávila; St. John of the Cross	Carmelite	1568
Discalced Mercedarians	O.M.D.	Fr. Juan Bautista González Alcázar, O. de M.	Mercedarian	1603
Disciples of the Divine Saviour, India	D.D.S.			
Disciples of the Lord Jesus Christ				
Discipulos de los Corazones de Jesus y Maria	D.C.J.M.			
Dominican Missionaries for the Deaf Apostolate	O.P. Miss.		Dominican	2004
Dominican Missionary Sisters of St. Elizabeth	D.M.S.E.		Dominican	
Dominican Nuns of the Perpetual Rosary	O.P.	Mother Domien-Marie Saintourens	Dominican	1880
Dominicans (Order of Preachers)	O.P.	St. Dominic	Dominican	13th century
Dominican Sisters of Blauvelt (Congregation of St. Dominic of Blauvelt)	O.P.	Mother Mary Sammon	Dominican	1890
Dominican Sisters of Grand Rapids (Dominican Congregation of Our Lady of the Sacred Heart)	O.P.	Bishop Caspar Henry Borgess	Dominican	1877
Dominican Sisters of Hawthorne	O.P.	Mother Rose Hawthorne Lathrop	Dominican	1900
Dominican Sisters of Hope	O.P.		Dominican	1995
Dominican Sisters of Mary, Mother of the Eucharist	O.P.	Mother Mary Assumpta Long	Dominican	1997
Dominican Sisters of Peace	O.P.		Dominican	2009
Dominican Sisters of San Rafael (Dominican Congregation of the Most Holy Name of Jesus)	O.P.	Bishop Joseph Sadoc Alemany; Mother Mary of the Cross Goemaere	Dominican	1850
Dominican Sisters of Sparkill (Dominican Congregation of Our Lady of the Rosary)	O.S.D.	Mother Catherine M. Antoninus	Dominican	1876
Dominican Sisters of St. Cecilia	O.P.	Bishop James Whelan	Dominican	1860
Dominican Sisters of the Annunciation of the Blessed Virgin	O.P.	St. Francisco Coll Guitart	Dominican	1856
Dominican Sisters of the Immaculate Conception	O.P.	Mother Maria Bialecka	Dominican	1861
Dominican Sisters of the Most Holy Name	O.P.		Dominican	1850
Dominican Sisters of the Queen of the Rosary	O.P.		Dominican	1888
E
Elim Communities		Wilfredo Nakar Luli Nakar	Charismatic, Franciscan	1980
Emmanuel Community	Comm l'Emm	Pierre Goursat; Martine Lafitte-Catta		1976
English Benedictine Congregation	E.B.C.		Benedictine	1607–1633
F
Faithful Companions of Jesus Sisters	F.C.J.	Ven. Marie-Madeleine d'Houët		1820
"Familiares" of Teutonic Order	Fam.O.T.			
Fathers of Mercy	C.P.M.	Fr. Jean-Baptiste Rauzan		1808
Federation of the Sisters of Mercy	R.S.M.		Sisters of Mercy	1973
Fervent Daughters of the Sacred Heart of Jesus	F.D.S.H.J.			
Filippini Sisters (Religious Teachers Filippini, Sisters of St. Lucy Filippini)	M.P.F.	St. Lucy Filippini; Cardinal Marco Antonio Barbarigo		1692
Filles de la Sagesse, Daughters of Wisdom	F.D.L.S.			
Foreign Missions Society of Bethlehem in Switzerland (Bethlehem Father)	S.M.B.			
Francisca Sisters of St. Elizabeth	O.S.E.		Franciscan	
Franciscan Apostolic Sisters	F.A.S.	Fr. Gerardo Filippeto	Franciscan	1954
Franciscan Brothers of Brooklyn	O.S.F.	Bishop John Loughlin	Franciscan	1858
Franciscan Brothers of Peace	F.B.P.	Br. Michael Gaworski	Franciscans	1982
Franciscan Brothers of the Eucharist	F.B.E.		Franciscans	2002
Franciscan Brothers of the Holy Cross	F.F.S.C.	James Wirth	Franciscan	1862
Franciscan Clarist Congregation, India	F.C.C.			
Franciscan Clarist Congregation			Franciscan	19th century
Franciscan Companions of Jesus and Mary	F.C.J.M.			
Franciscan Friars of the Immaculate	F.I.	Fr. Stefano Maria Manelli; Fr. Gabriel Maria Pellettieri	Franciscan	1970
Franciscan Friars of the Renewal	C.F.R.	Fr. Benedict Groeschel	Franciscan	1987
Franciscan Handmaids of Mary		Ignatius Lissner	Franciscan	1915
Franciscan Hospitaller Sisters of the Immaculate Conception	F.H.I.C.	Mother Maria Clara	Franciscan	1871
Franciscan Immaculative Sisters, India	S.F.I.			
Franciscan Minims of the Perpetual Help of Mary	F.M.		Franciscan	1942
Franciscan Missionary Sisters of Littlehampton	F.M.S.L.		Franciscan	
Franciscan Missionaries of Christ the King	F.M.C.K.	Mother Bridget Sequeira	Franciscan	1937
Franciscan Missionaries of Mary	F.M.M.	Helene de Chappotin	Franciscan	1877
Franciscan Missionaries of St. Joseph	F.M.S.J.		Franciscan	
Franciscan Missionaries of the Divine Motherhood	F.M.D.M.	Mother Colette	Franciscan	1887
Franciscan Missionaries of the Eternal Word	M.F.V.A.	Mother Angelica, PCPA	Franciscan	1987
Franciscan Missionary Sisters for Africa	F.M.S.A.		Franciscan	
Franciscan Missionary Sisters of the Immaculate Heart of Mary	O.S.F.	Blessed Mary Catherine Troiani	Franciscan	1868
Franciscan Missionary Sisters of the Infant Jesus			Franciscan	1879
Franciscan Nardini Sisters of the Holy Family (Nardini Sisters, Mallersdorfer Sisters)	F.P.M.	Blessed Paul Joseph Nardini	Franciscan	1855
Franciscan Servants of Jesus			Franciscan	1997
Franciscan Servants of Mary	F.S.M.	Marie Virginie Vaslin	Franciscan	1852
Franciscan Servants of the Sacred Heart	S.S.C.		Franciscan	
Franciscan Sisters of Allegany	O.S.F.	Fr. Pamfilo of Magliano	Franciscan	1859
Franciscan Sisters of Christ the King		Fr. Eugene N. Heidt	Franciscan	2000
Franciscan Sisters of Christian Charity	O.S.F.	Ambrose Oschwald	Franciscan	1869
Franciscan Sisters of Mary Immaculate		Blessed Mother Caritas Brader	Franciscan	1893
Franciscan Sisters of Mary	F.S.M.		Franciscan	1987
Franciscan Sisters of Mill Hill	O.S.F.		Franciscan	
Franciscan Sisters of Penance of the Sorrowful Mother	T.O.R.	Bishop Albert Henry Ottenweller	Franciscan	1988
Franciscan Sisters of Perpetual Adoration	F.S.P.A.		Franciscan	1849
Franciscan Sisters of Siessen	O.S.F.		Franciscan	
Franciscan Sisters of St. Aloysius Gonzaga	F.S.A.G.		Franciscan	
Franciscan Sisters of St. Clare	F.S.C.		Franciscan	
Franciscan Sisters of St. Joseph	F.S.S.J.		Franciscan	
Franciscan Sisters of St. Mary of the Angels	F.S.M.A.		Franciscan	
Franciscan Sisters of the Eucharist	F.S.E.		Franciscan	1973
Franciscan Sisters of the Eucharistic Heart of Jesus	F.E.H.J.		Franciscan	
Franciscan Sisters of the Family of Mary		Zygmunt Szczęsny Feliński	Franciscan	1857
Franciscan Sisters of the Immaculate Conception	F.S.I.C.	Refugio Morales	Franciscan	1874
Franciscan Sisters of the Immaculate Conception	F.I.C.		Franciscan	
Franciscan Sisters of the Sacred Heart	F.S.S.H.	Fr. Wilhelm Berger	Franciscan	1866
Franciscans of Primitive Observance	F.P.O.			
Fransalians (Missionaries of St. Francis de Sales)	M.S.F.S.	Fr. Peter Mermier	De Sales	1838
Fraternity Jesus Caritas			Foucauldian	1952
Fraternity of Charles de Foucauld			Foucauldian	1992
Friars of St. Francis	F.S.F.		Franciscan	1993
Friars of the Sick Poor of Los Angeles	F.S.P	Br. Richard Hirbe	Friars	2001
G
Glenmary Home Missioners		Fr. William Howard Bishop	Glenmary	1939
Glenmary Sisters		Fr. William Howard Bishop	Glenmary	1941
Good Shepherd Sisters (Sisters of Jesus the Good Shepherd, Pastorelles)		Blessed James Alberione	Pauline	1938
Grey Nuns of the Sacred Heart	G.N.S.H.		Vincentian-Setonian	1921
Grey Nuns (Sisters of Charity of Montreal)	S.G.M.	St. Marguerite d'Youville	Vincentian-Setonian	1738
Grey Sisters of the Immaculate Conception	G.S.I.C.	77 Sisters of Charity of Ottawa	Vincentian-Setonian	1926
Groupe Charles de Foucauld			Foucaldian	1923
Guadalupan Missionaries of the Holy Spirit		Ven. Félix de Jesús Rougier	Felixian	1930
H
Handmaids of Charity	A.D.C.	Maria Crocifissa di Rosa		1840
Handmaids of Christ the Priest	H.C.P.			
Handmaids of Christ, India	H.C.			
Handmaids of the Blessed Sacrament and of Charity	A.A.S.C.	Saint María Micaela of the Blessed Sacrament		1950
Handmaids of the Holy Child Jesus	H.H.C.J.	Mother Mary Charles Magdelene Walker		1937
Handmaids of the Precious Blood	H.P.B.			1947
Handmaids of the Sacred Heart of Jesus, Mary and Joseph				1978
Handmaids of the Sacred Heart of Jesus	A.C.J	Raphaela Maria		1877
Helpers of Mount Rosary (India)	H.M.R.			
Heralds of the Good News (India)	H.H.N.			
Heralds of the Gospel	E.P.	Msgr. João Scognamiglio Clá Dias	Heralds of the Gospel	1970
Hermanas de la Caridad de Santa Ana (Sisters of Charity of Saint Anne)	H.C.S.A.			
Hermits of St. Augustine	E.O.S.A.		Augustinian	
Hermits of St. Bruno	H.S.B.		Carthusian	2001
Hermits of the Most Blessed Virgin Mary of Mount Carmel	O. Carm.		Carmelite	12th century
Hieronymites (Order of St. Jerome)	O.S.H.		Augustinian	14th century
Holy Family Sisters of Spoleto (India)	H.F.S.			
Holy Spirit Fathers (Apostolic Life Community of Priests), India	A.L.C.P.			
Holy Spirit Adoration Sisters (Pink Sisters)	S.Sp.S.A.P.	St. Arnold Janssen	Arnoldus	1896
Hospitaller Sisters of Mercy, India	H.S.M.			
Hospitaller Sisters of the Sacred Heart of Jesus	H.S.C.			
I
Idente Missionaries (Institute of Christ the Redeemer)	M.Id	Fernando Rielo		1959
Indian Missionary Society	I.M.S.	Fr. Gaspar A Pinto		1941
Institut des Frères Serviteurs			Foucauldian	1979
Institut du Clergé Patriarcal de Bzommar	I.C.P.B.			
Institute of Brothers of Christian Instruction of Ploermel	F.I.C.P.			
Institute of Christ the King Sovereign Priest	I.C.R.S.S.	Gilles Wach		
Institute of Foreign Missions, India	M.E.			
Institute of the Good Shepherd	I.B.P.			2006
Institute of Jesus the Priest		Blessed James Alberione	Pauline	1959
Institute of Mary of the Annunciation		Blessed James Alberione	Pauline	1958
Institute of Our Lady of Guadalupe for Foreign Missions	M.G.			
Institute of Our Lady of Mercy (Great Britain)	R.S.M.		Sisters of Mercy	1983
Institute of Our Lady	I.M.I.M.G.			
Institute of St. Gabriel the Archangel		Blessed James Alberione	Pauline	1958
Institute of the Daughters of Mary, Sisters of the Pious Schools	Sch. P.	St. Paula Montel Fornés		1847
Institute of the Holy Family		Blessed James Alberione	Pauline	1960
Institute of the Incarnate Word (Instituto del Verbo Encarnado)	I.V.E.			
Institute of the Incarnate Word	I.V.E.	Fr. Carlos Miguel Buela	Institute of the Incarnate Word	1984
Institute of the Schoenstatt Sisters of Mary	I.S.S.M.	Joseph Kentenich	Schoenstatt Apostolic Movement	1926
International Movement of Catholic Students, Pax Romana	I.M.C.S.			
Istituto del Prado	Ist. del Prado	Antoine Chevrier		1856
J
Jesuits (Society of Jesus)	S.J.	St. Ignatius of Loyola		1540
Josephite Sisters (Redemptorists Sisters of St. Joseph)	J.SS.R.		Josephite	
L
Ladies of Bethany	L.B.			1919
Legion of Christ	L.C.	Fr. Marcial Maciel	Regnum Christi	1941
Les Filles de la Providence	F.D.L.P.			
Licentiate in Medieval Studies	L.S.M.			
Licentiate in Medieval Studies	M.S.L.			
Little Brothers of Jesus of the Most Blessed Sacrament			Foucauldian	
Little Brothers of Jesus	L.B.J.		Foucauldian	1933
Little Brothers of Nazareth	L.B.N.			
Little Brothers of the Good Shepherd	B.G.S.	Br. Mathias Barrett		1951
Little Brothers of the Gospel		Fr. René Voillaume	Foucauldian	1956
Little Daughters of St. Francis Xavier, India	L.D.F.X.			
Little Flower Congregation	C.S.T.			
Little Servants of Mary Immaculate	L.S.M.I.			
Little Servants of the Sacred Heart of Jesus for the Sick Poor	P.S.S.C.	Giovanna Francesca Michelotti		1874
Little Sisters of Christ, India	L.S.C.			
Little Sisters of Jesus	L.S.J.			
Little Sisters of Jesus		Madeleine Hutin	Foucauldian	1939
Little Sisters of Sr. Therese of Lisieux, India	L.S.T.			
Little Sisters of the Abandoned Elderly	H.A.D.	Teresa of Jesus Jornet		1872
Little Sisters of the Assumption	L.S.A.			
Little Sisters of the Assumption	L.S.A.	Fr. Etienne Pernet	Augustinian	1865
Little Sisters of the Gospel		Fr. René Voillaume	Foucauldian	1963
Little Sisters of the Incarnation				
Little Sisters of the Mother of Sorrows		Clelia Barbieri		1868
Little Sisters of the Poor (India)	P.S.D.P.			
Little Sisters of the Poor	L.S.P.	St. Jeanne Jugan		1839
Little daughters of St Joseph	L.D.ofS.J.			
Living the Gospel Community	L.G.C.	Msgr. Frederick Kriekenbeek		1974
Loreto Sisters (Institute of the Blessed Virgin Mary)	I.B.V.M.	Ven. Mary Ward		1609
Lovers of the Holy Cross of Bac Ha	L.H.C.B.H.		Lovers of the Holy Cross	
Lovers of the Holy Cross of Binh Cang Nha Trang	L.H.C.B.C.N.T.		Lovers of the Holy Cross	
Lovers of the Holy Cross of Cai Mon	L.H.C.C.M.		Lovers of the Holy Cross	
Lovers of the Holy Cross of Huong-Phuong	L.H.C.H.P.		Lovers of the Holy Cross	
Lovers of the Holy Cross of Nha Trang	L.H.C.N.T.	Bishop Marcel Piquet	Lovers of the Holy Cross	1955
Lovers of the Holy Cross of Phát Diệm	L.H.C.P.D.	Bishop Alexandre Marcou Thành	Lovers of the Holy Cross	1902
Lovers of the Holy Cross of Thanh Hoa	L.H.C.T.H.		Lovers of the Holy Cross	
Lovers of the Holy Cross of Phan Thien	L.H.C.P.T.		Lovers of the Holy Cross	
Lovers of the Holy Cross of Tan Viet	L.H.C.T.V.		Lovers of the Holy Cross	
Lovers of the Holy Cross of Thu Thiem	L.H.C.T.T.		Lovers of the Holy Cross	
Lovers of the Holy Cross of Go Vap	L.H.C.G.V.		Lovers of the Holy Cross	
Lovers of the Holy Cross of Los Angeles	L.H.C.	Bishop William R. Johnson	Lovers of the Holy Cross	1978
Lovers of the Holy Cross (Vietnam)	T.H.C.S.	Bishop Pierre Lambert de la Motte	Lovers of the Holy Cross	1670
M
Malabar Missionary Brothers (India)	M.M.B.			
Marian Fathers of the Immaculate Conception of the Blessed Virgin Mary	M.I.C.	St. Stanislaus Papczyński		1673
Marian Sisters of the Diocese of Lincoln (Marian Sisters)	M.S.			1952
Marian Sisters of Santa Rosa	M.S.S.R.	Mother Teresa Christe		2012
Marianist Sisters	F.M.I.	Blessed William Joseph Chaminade; Ven. Adèle de Batz de Trenquelléon	Marianist	1816
Marianist Lay Communities	M.L.C.		Marianist	
Marianists (Society of Mary)	S.M.		Marianist	
Marianites of Holy Cross	M.S.C.	Blessed Basil Moreau	Holy Cross	1841
Marist Brothers	F.M.S.	St. Marcellin Champagnat	Marist	1817
Marist Fathers (Society of Mary)	S.M.	Ven. Jean-Claude Colin	Marist	1816
Marist Missionary Sister	S.M.S.M.			
Marist Sisters	S.M.	Ven. Jean-Claude Colin; Jeanne-Marie Chavoin	Marist	1823
Maronite	O.Mar.			
Maryknoll Fathers and Brothers	M.M.	Thomas Frederick Price & James Anthony Walsh	Maryknoll	1911
Maryknoll Sisters of St. Dominic	M.M.	Mother Mary Joseph Rogers	Maryknoll	1912
Maryknoll Society	M.M.	Thomas Frederick Price & James Anthony Walsh and Mother Mary Joseph Rogers	Maryknoll	1911–1919
Medical Mission Sisters	S.C.M.M.	Dr. Anna Dengel		1925
Medical Missionaries of Mary	M.M.M.	Mary Martin	Benedictine	1937
Medical Sisters of St. Francis of Assisi (India)	O.S.F.		Franciscan	
Medical Sisters of St. Joseph, India	M.S.J.			
Mehrerau Cistercian Congregation			Benedictine	1624
Mekhitarists	C.M.V.	Abbot Mekhitar of Sebaste	Benedictine	1717
Mercedarian Missionaries of Berríz		Mother Margarita Lopez de Maturana	Mercedarian	1926
Mercedarian Sisters of the Blessed Sacrament	H.M.S.S.	Mother Maria del Refugio	Mercedarian	1946
Mercedarians (Order of the Blessed Virgin Mary of Mercy)	O. de M.; O. Merc.	St. Peter Nolasco	Mercedarian	1218
Messengers of Mother Mary	M.M.M.			
Miles Christi	M.C.	Fr. Roberto Juan Yannuzzi		1994
Military and Hospitaller Order of St. Lazarus of Jerusalem	O.S.L.J.	Crusaders of the Latin Kingdom of Jerusalem		1119
Militia Immaculatae (Knights of the Immaculata)	M.I.	St. Maximillian Kolbe		1917
Mill Hill Missionaries (St. Joseph's Missionary Society of Mill Hill)	M.H.M.	Fr. Herbert Alfred Vaughan		1866
Minim Nuns (Federation of the Minim Nuns)			Minim	
Minims	O.M.	St. Francis of Paola	Minim	1435
Misioneros de Yarumal, Columbia	I.M.E.Y.			
Mission Helpers of The Sacred Heart	M.H.S.H.			1890
Mission Sisters of Ajmer, India	M.S.A.			
Missionare Vom Hl. Johannes Des Täufer	M.S.J.			
Missionaries of Charity	M.C.	St. Mother Teresa of Calcutta	Missionaries of Charity	1950
Missionaries of Charity Brothers	M.C.	St. Mother Teresa of Calcutta; Fr. Ian Travers-Ball	Missionaries of Charity	1963
Missionaries of Charity Contemplative Fathers and Brothers	M.C.	Mother Teresa; Fr. Sebastian Vazhakala	Missionaries of Charity	1979
Missionaries of Charity Contemplative Sisters	M.C.	Mother Teresa; Sr. M. Nirmala	Missionaries of Charity	1963
Missionaries of Charity Fathers	M.C.	Mother Teresa; Fr. Joseph Langford	Missionaries of Charity	1984
Missionaries of Christ Jesus, India	M.C.J.			
Missionaries of God's Love	M.G.L.	Fr. Ken Barker		1986
Missionaries of Jesus the Eternal Priest	M.J.	Ven. Margherita Maria Guaini		1947
Missionaries of La Salette	M.S.	Bishop Philibert de Bruillard	La Salette	1852
Missionary Sisters of La Salette	S.N.D.S.	Bishop Philibert de Bruillard	La Salette	1852
Missionaries of the Little Flower	M.L.F.			
Missionaries of Mariannhill	C.M.M.	Fr. Francis Pfanner		1907
Missionaries of Mary Immaculate	M.M.I.			
Missionaries of Mary Mediatrix	M.M.M.			
Missionaries of Mary		Sr. Sophie Renoux; Sr. Edit Fabian; Sr. Rachel Luxford		2007
Missionaries of St. Joseph	M.J.			
Missionaries of St. Alphonso de Liguori		St. Anthony Gianelli	Gianelli	1827
Missionaries of St. Giuseppe of Mexico	M.J.			
Missionaries of the Blessed Sacrament	M.S.S.			
Missionaries of the Gospel of Life		Fr. Frank Pavone	Priests for Life	2005
Missionaries of the Holy Apostles	M.S.A.			
Missionaries of the Holy Spirit	M.Sp.S.	Ven. Félix de Jesús Rougier	Felixian	1914
Missionaries of the Immaculate Heart of Mary	M.I.H.M.			
Missionaries of the Nativity of Mary	M.N.M.			
Missionaries of the Poor	M.O.P.	Fr. Richard Ho Lung		1981
Missionaries of the Sacred Heart	M.S.C.	Blessed Jules Chevalier		1854
Missionaries of the Sacred Hearts of Jesus and Mary	M.SS.C.			
Missionaries of the Sacred Hearts of Jesus and Mary	M.S.H.J.M.	St. Gaetano Errico		1836
Missionary Catechists of Divine Providence	M.C.D.P.	Mother Mary Benitia Vermeersch	Divine Providence	1930
Missionary Catechists of St. Therese of the Child Jesus	M.C.S.T.			
Missionary Congregation of Saint Andrew the Apostle	C.M.S.A.A.	Fr. Irineusz Michalik		1997
Missionary Congregation of the Blessed Sacrament	M.C.B.S.	Fr. Mathew Alakulam; Fr. Joseph Paredom		1933
Missionary Fathers of Rosa Mystica	M.F.R.M	Francesco Rossi	Rosa mystica Fathers	1940
Missionary Franciscan of the Immaculate Conception	M.F.I.C.			
Missionary Fraternity of Mary	M.F.M.			
Missionary Oblates of Mary Immaculate	O.H.F.			
Missionary Oblates of Mary Immaculate	O.M.I.	St. Eugène de Mazenod		1816
Missionary Oblates of the Holy Family	O.S.F.	Fr. Enrique Méndez Garibay		1988
Missionary Servants of Most Holy Trinity	S.T.			
Missionary Servants of the Most Blessed Trinity	M.S.B.T.			
Missionary Servants of the Most Holy Trinity	M.T.			
Missionaries Servants of the Word	M.S.P.	Fr. Luigi Butera		1984
Missionary Sisters, Servants of the Holy Spirit	S.Sp.S.	St. Arnold Janssen	Arnoldus	1889
Missionary Sisters of Incarnation, India	S.M.I.			
Missionary Sisters of Mary Help of Christians, India	M.S.M.H.C.			
Missionary Sisters of Mary Immaculate, India	M.S.M.I.			
Missionary Sisters of Service	M.S.S.			
Missionary Sisters of St. Theresa, Servant of Passion	S.T.S.P.	Mother G. Teresa; Bishop J. Morgades de Vic; Mother Benedicta Louisa	Consolars of Christ Passion Family.	1893–1992
Missionary Sisters of St. Therese of Infant Jesus, India	M.S.S.T.			
Missionary Sisters of the Assumption	M.S.A.			
Missionary Sisters of the Blessed Sacrament	S.B.S.			
Missionary Sisters of the Holy Rosary	M.S.H.R.			
Missionary Sisters of the Immaculate (Nirmala Sisters), India	M.S.I.			
Missionary Sisters of the Immaculate Conception	S.M.I.C.	Abbot Armand August Bahlmann; Mother Elizabeth Tombrock	Franciscan	1910
Missionary Sisters of the Immaculate Heart of Mary	I.C.M.			
Missionary Sisters of the Lord's Table (Mensa Domini Sisters)	M.S.L.T (M.D.S)	Bishop Cornelio de Wit, M.H.M.	Mill Hill Missionaries	1962
Missionary Sisters of the Queen of the Apostles, India	S.R.A.			
Missionary Sisters of the Sacred Heart (Cabrini)	M.S.C.			
Missionary Sisters of the Sacred Heart	M.S.S.H.			
Missionary Sisters of the Society of Mary	S.M.S.M.			
Missionary Society of St. Thomas the Apostle	M.S.T.			
Missionary Society of St. Paul	M.S.S.P.			
Missionary Society of the Sacred Heart of Jesus, India	M.S.C.J.			
Missionary Sons of the Sacred Heart of Jesus	M.F.S.C.			
Missioni Africane di Verona (Verona Fathers)	F.S.C.J.			
Monks of Bethlehem (Monastic Brothers of Bethlehem, of the Assumption of the Virgin and of St. Bruno)			Carthusian	1976
Monastic Fraternities of Jerusalem		Br. Pierre-Marie Delfieux		1975
Monks of the Most Blessed Virgin Mary of Mount Carmel	M. Carm.	Bishop David L. Ricken	Carmelite	2003
Montfort Missionaries (Company of Mary)	S.M.M.	St. Louis de Montfort	Montfortian	1705
N
Nga Whaea Atawhai o Aotearoa Sisters of Mercy New Zealand	R.S.M.		Sisters of Mercy	2005
O
Oblate Apostles of the Two Hearts	O.A.T.H.			1995
Oblate Hospital Franciscan Sisters (India)	O.H.F.S.			
Oblate Sisters of Jesus the Priest	O.J.S.	Ven. Félix de Jesús Rougier, M.Sp.S.		1924
Oblate Sisters of Providence	O.S.P.	James Nicholas Joubert & Mary Elizabeth Lange		1829
Oblate Sisters of St. Francis de Sales	O.S.F.S.	Fr. Louis Brisson; Mother Marie de Sales Chappuis	Salesian	1868
Oblate Sisters of the Sacred Heart of Jesus		Teresa Casini		1894
Oblates of Jesus the Priest	O.J.S.	Ven. Félix de Jesús Rougier	Felixian	1924
Oblates of St. Alphonso de Liguori		St. Anthony Gianelli	Gianelli	1838
Oblates of St. Charles	O.S.C.			
Oblates of St. Francis de Sales	O.S.F.S.	Fr. Louis Brisson	Salesian	1875
Oblates of St. Joseph (Josephines of Asti)	O.S.I.			
Oblates of St. Joseph	O.S.J.	St. Joseph Marello		1878
Oblates of St. Therese Reformed	O.S.T.R.			
Oblates of Sts. Ambrose and Charles	O.Ss.C.A.			
Oblates of Wisdom	O.S.			
Oblates of the Blessed Trinity			Trinitarian	1987
Oblates of the Holy Spirit	O.S.S.	Elena Guerra		1882
Oblates of the Most Holy Trinity			Trinitarian	
Oblates of the Precious Blood	O.P.B.			
Oblates of the Virgin Mary	O.M.V.	Bruno Lanteri		1827
Olivetans (Order of Our Lady of Mount Olivet)	O.S.B. Oliv.	St. Bernardo Tolomei	Benedictine	1313
Opus Dei (The Prelature of the Holy Cross and Opus Dei)	Opus Dei	St. Josemaría Escrivá	Opus Dei	1928
Opus Spiritus Sancti, India	O.S.S.			
Order of Augustinian Recollects	O.A.R.		Augustinian	16th century
Order of Canons Regular of the Holy Cross	O.R.C.			
Order of Discalced Carmelites Secular	O.C.D.S.			
Order of Friars Minor Capuchin	O.F.M. Cap.	Fr. Matteo da Bascio	Franciscan	1525
Order of Friars Minor Conventual (Grey Friars)	O.F.M. Conv.	St. Francis of Assisi	Franciscan	1209
Order of Friars Minor Regular	O.F.M.Reg.			
Order of Friars Minor (Franciscan Order)	O.F.M.	St. Francis of Assisi	Franciscan	1209
Order of Friars of Mary Immaculate (Franciscans)	O.F.M.I.		Franciscan	
Order of Lebanese Maronite (Baladites)	O.L.M.			
Order of Merciful Christ	O.M.C.			
Order of Our Most Holy Saviour (Bridgettines), India	O.S.S.S.			
Order of St. Augustine	O.S.A.	St. Augustine of Hippo	Augustinian	1244
Order of Saint Basil the Great	O.S.B.M.		Greek Catholic Churches	1596
Oblates of St. Benedict	Obl. S.B.		Benedictine	
Order of St. Benedict	O.S.B.	St. Benedict of Nursia	Benedictine	529
Order of St. Camillus, India	O.S.C.			
Order of St. Clare (Poor Clares)	O.S.C.	St. Francis of Assisi; St. Clare of Assisi	Franciscan	1212
Order of the Holy Cross	O.S.Cr.			
Order of the Ministers of the Sick (Camillians)	M.I.			
Ottilien Congregation		Dom Andreas Amrhein	Benedictine	1884
Our Lady's Missionaries of the Eucharist	O.L.M.E.			
Our Lady's Nurses of the Poor	O.L.N.			
P
Padro Sisters	P.S.			
Palliumites (Society of the Pallium)	S.S.P.	Pope Pius IX		1851
Paris Foreign Missions Society	M.E.P.	Fr. Alexandre de Rhodes		1658
Parish Visitors of Mary Immaculate	P.V.M.I.	Mother Mary Teresa Tallon		1920
Passionist Nuns (Congregation of the Passion of Jesus Christ)	C.P.		Passionist	
Passionist Sisters (Sisters of the Cross and the Passion)		Mother Elizabeth Prout	Passionist	1852
Passionists (Congregation of the Passion)	C.P.	St. Paul of the Cross	Passionist	1720
Patriarchal Congregation of Bzommar	I.P.C.B.	Patriarch Jacob Petros II Hovsepian		1750
Patrician Brothers	F.S.P.	Daniel Delany		1808
Pauline Fathers (Order of Saint Paul the First Hermit)	O.S.P.P.E.	Blessed Eusebius of Esztergom		1250
Pauvres de Saint-François (Poor of St. Francis) (France)	P.S.F.		Franciscan	
Petites Franciscaines de Marie (Little Franciscans of Mary) (France)	P.F.M.		Franciscan	
Petites Soeurs du Coeur de Jésus (Bangui, Central African Republic)			Franciscan	
Piarists (Order Poor Clerics Regular of the Mother of God of the Pious Schools, Scolopi, Escolapios)	S.P.; Sch. P.	St. Joseph Calasanz		1617
Piccole Figlie di St. Giuseppe (Italy)	PP.FF. St. G.			
Pious Disciples of the Divine Master	P.D.D.M.	Blessed James Alberione; Mother Maria Scolastica Rivata	Pauline	1924
Poor Brothers of St. Francis	C.F.P.	Johannes Hoever	Franciscan	1861
Poor Clares of Perpetual Adoration	P.C.P.A.	Marie Claire Bouillevaux	Franciscan	1854
Poor Clares of Santa Barbara			Franciscan	1928
Poor Handmaids of Jesus Christ	P.H.J.C.	Blessed Catherine Kasper		1851
Poor Servants of Divine Providence (India)	P.S.D.P.			
Poor Sisters of Divine Providence (India)	P.S.D.P.			
Poor Sisters of Jesus Crucified and the Sorrowful Mother	C.J.C.	Fr. Alphonsus Maria		1924
Poor Sisters of Nazareth	P.S.N.			
Poor Sisters of Our Lady (India)	P.S.O.L.			
Poor Sisters of St. Joseph-Hermanas (Pobres Josefinas Buenoarensas)	P.S.S.J.			
Portuguese Society for Catholic Missions	S.M.P.			
Prabhudasi Sisters of Ajmer (Handmaids of the Lord) (India)	P.S.A.			
Premonstratensians (Order of Canons Regular of Prémontré, Norbertines, White Canons)	O.praem	St. Norbert of Xanten	Premonstratensians	1120
Presentation Brothers of Mary	F.P.M.			
Presentation Brothers	F.P.M.	Blessed Edmund Ignatius Rice	Edmund Rice	1802
Presentation Sisters (Sisters of the Presentation of the Blessed Virgin Mary)	P.B.V.M.	Ven. Nano Nagle	Presentation Sisters	1775
Presentation Sisters of Watervliet, New York (Sisters of the Presentation of the Blessed Virgin Mary)	P.B.V.M.	Presentation Sisters from Ireland	Presentation Sisters	1881
Priestly Fraternity of St. Peter	F.S.S.P.	Fr. Josef Bisig		1988
Priestly Society of St. Joseph Benedict Cottolengo (Cottolengo Congregation)	S.S.C.			1840
Priestly Society of the Holy Cross		St. Josemaría Escrivá	Opus Dei	1943
Priests for Life	P.F.L.	Fr. Lee Kaylor	Priests for Life	1990
Priests of the Sacred Heart (Dehonians)	S.C.J.	Fr. Léon Dehon		1878
Putri Karmel			Carmelite	1982
Q
Queen of Apostles Sisters (Sisters of Mary, Queen of Apostles)		Blessed James Alberione	Pauline	1959
Qui Nhon Missionary Sisters of the Holy Cross	L.H.C.		Lovers of the Holy Cross	1922
R
Racine Dominican Sisters (Congregation of Sisters of St. Dominic of St. Catherine of Sienna)	O.P.		Dominican	1862
Redemptoristines (Order of the Most Holy Redeemer)	O.S.S.R.	Maria Celeste Crostarosa; St. Alphonsus Liguori	Redemptorist	1731
Redemptorists (Congregation of the Most Holy Redeemer)	C.Ss.R.	St. Alphonsus Liguori	Redemptorist	1732
Regina Virginum	E.P.	Msgr. João Scognamiglio Clá Dias	Heralds of the Gospel	2005
Regnum Christi Consecrated Men	R.C.	Fr. Marcial Maciel; Fr. Álvaro Corcuera	Regnum Christi	1975
Regnum Christi Consecrated Women	R.C.	Margarita Estrada; Guadalupe Magaña; Graciela Magaña	Regnum Christi	1969
Regular Franciscan Tertiary Sisters, India	R.F.T.S.			
Religieux de Saint Paul de Vincent	R.S.V.			
Religious Sisters of Charity (Irish Sisters of Charity)	R.S.C.	Mary Aikenhead		1815
Sisters of Mercy of Philippines	R.S.M.	Bishop Lino Gonzaga	Sisters of Mercy	1954
Religious Sisters of Mercy of Alma, Michigan	R.S.M.			1973
Religious of Christian Education		Abbé Louis Lafosse		1817
Religious of Divine Compassion	R.D.C.			
Religious of Jesus and Mary	R.J.M.	St. Claudine Thévenet		1818
Religious of Mary Immaculate	R.M.I.	Vincentia Maria López y Vicuña		1876
Religious of Nazareth				
Religious of the Assumption	R.A.	Mother Marie-Eugénie de Jésus, R.A.	Assumptionist Sisters	1839
Religious of the Sacred Heart of Mary	R.S.H.M.	Jean Gailhac		1849
Religious of the Virgin Mary	R.V.M.	Ven. Ignacia del Espíritu Santo		1684
Resurrectionist Congregation	C.R.	Peter Semenenko		1836
Rogationists of the Heart of Jesus	R.C.J.	St. Annibale Maria di Francia		1897
Rosminians (Institute of Charity)	I.C.	Blessed Antonio Rosmini-Serbati		1828
S
Sacred Heart Congregation, India	S.H.			
Sacred Heart Sisters, India	S.H.S.			
Sadhu Sevana Sisters (India)	S.S.S.	Fr. Thomas Maliekal		1975
Saint Joseph Sevika Samtha, India	S.J.S.			
Saint Patrick’s Society for the Foreign Missions (Kiltegan Fathers)	S.P.S.	Bishop Joseph Shanahan; Fr. Patrick Whitney		1920
Salesian Missionaries of Mary Immaculate, India	S.M.M.I.			
Salesian Sisters (Daughters of Mary Help of Christians)	F.M.A.	St. Maria Domenica Mazzarello	Salesian	1872
Salesians of Don Bosco (Society of St. Francis de Sales)	S.D.B.	St. John Bosco	Salesian	1857
Salvatorians (Society of the Divine Savior)	S.D.S.	Ven. Francis Mary of the Cross Jordan		1881
Satya Seva Catechist Sisters, India	S.C.S.			
Scalabrinian Missionaries (Missionaries of St. Charles Borromeo)	C.S.	Blessed Giovanni Battista Scalabrini	Scalabrinian	1887
Scalabrinian Missionary Sisters (Missionary Sisters of St. Charles Borromeo)	C.S.	Blessed Giovanni Battista Scalabrini	Scalabrinian	1895
Scarboro Foreign Mission Society	S.F.M.			1918
School Sisters of Christ the King	C.K.	Bishop Glennon Patrick Flavin		1976
School Sisters of Notre Dame	S.S.N.D.	Mother Caroline Gerhardinger		1833
School Sisters of St. Francis	S.S.S.F.	Sr. Mary Alexia	Franciscan	1874
Secular Franciscans	O.F.S.			
Secular Institute of Schoenstatt Fathers	ISch	Joseph Kentenich	Schoenstatt Apostolic Movement	1965
Secular Order of Jesus, Mary and Joseph	J.M.J.			
Servants of Charity (Guanellians)	Sd.C.; S.C.	St. Luigi Guanella		1908
Servants of Christ the Priest	S.C.P.			
Servants of Christ	A.K; A.D.S.K	Mgr. Petrus Johannes Willekens. SJ		1938
Servants of Mary, India	S.M.			
Servants of Mary, Mother of Sorrow, India	O.S.M.			
Servants of the Blessed Sacrament		St. Peter Julian Eymard; Mother Marguerite Guillot	Eymardian	1858
Servants of the Holy Child Jesus (Franciscans)	O.F.S.			
Servants of the Holy Cross			Augustinian	
Servants of the Holy Family	S.S.F.			1977
Servants of the Holy Heart of Mary	S.S.C.M.			
Servants of the Lord and the Virgin of Matara	S.S.V.M	Fr. Carlos Miguel Buela	Institute of the Incarnate Word	1985
Servites (Order of the Servants of Mary)	O.S.M.	Seven Holy Founders	Servites	1233
Servite Sisters (Religious Sisters of the Third Order of Servites, Mantellates)	O.S.M.	St. Philip; St. Juliana Falconieri	Servites	1284
Seva Missionary Sisters of Mary	S.M.S.M.	Msgr. John Kottaram		1974
Sinsinawa Dominican Sisters (Sinsinawa Dominican Congregation of the Most Holy Rosary)	O.P.	Fr. Samuel Charles Mazzuchelli	Dominican	1847
Sister Servants of the Eternal Word of Birmingham, Alabama	S.S.E.W.			
Sisters Adorers of the Precious Blood and Daughters of Mary Immaculate	A.P.B.			
Sisters Adorers of the Precious Blood	R.P.G.	Mother Catherine Caouette		1861
Sisters Adorers of the Royal Heart of Jesus Christ Sovereign Priest	ACRJCSS	Cardinal Ennio Antonelli	Salesian	2004
Sisters Little Workers of the Sacred Hearts, India	L.W.S.H.			
Sisters Minor of Mary Immaculate	S.M.M.I.			
Sisters Minor of Mary Immaculate		Fr. Elia M. Bruson, OFM Conv.; Mother Maria Elisabetta Patrizi		1983
Sister Servants of Mary Immaculate (Byzantine rite)	S.S.M.I.			
Sisters Servants of Our Lady of Sorrows, India	S.O.L.S.			
Sisters Servants of the Poor, India	S.D.P.			
Sisters for Christian Community	S.F.C.C.			
Sisters of Bethlehem (Monastic Sisters of Bethlehem, of the Assumption of the Virgin and of St. Bruno)			Carthusian	1950
Sisters of Calvary	S.C.			
Sisters of Charity of Australia	R.S.C.		Vincentian-Setonian	1838
Sisters of Charity of Cincinnati	S.C.	Mother Margaret Farrell George	Vincentian-Setonian	1829
Sisters of Charity of Good and Perpetual Succour	B.P.S.	Mother Caroline Lenferna de Laresle	Vincentian-Setonian	1850
Sisters of Charity of Jesus and Mary, India	S.C.J.M.			
Sisters of Charity of Jesus and Mary		Canon Petrus Joseph Triest	Vincentian-Setonian	1803
Sisters of Charity of Leavenworth	S.C.L.	Mother Xavier Ross	Vincentian-Setonian	1858
Sisters of Charity of Nazareth	S.C.N.	Bishop John Baptist Mary David	Vincentian-Setonian	1812
Sisters of Charity of Nevers		Dom Jean-Baptiste Delaveyne	Vincentian-Setonian	1680
Sisters of Charity of New York	S.C.	3 Sisters of Charity from Philadelphia	Vincentian-Setonian	1841
Sisters of Charity of Ottawa (Grey Nuns of Ottawa)	S.C.O.	Mother Elizabeth Bruyere	Vincentian-Setonian	1845
Sisters of Charity of Our Lady Mother of the Church			Vincentian-Setonian	
Sisters of Charity of Our Lady of Evron		Mother Perrine Thulard	Vincentian-Setonian	1682
Sisters of Charity of Our Lady of Mercy	O.L.M.	Bishop John England	Vincentian-Setonian	1829
Sisters of Charity of Providence	S.P.	Blessed Émilie Gamelin		1844
Sisters of Charity of Quebec	S.C.Q.	Mother Marcelle Mallet	Vincentian-Setonian	1849
Sisters of Charity of St. Elizabeth	S.C.	Mother Mary Xavier Mehegan	Vincentian-Setonian	1859
Sisters of Charity of Halifax (Sisters of Charity of St. Vincent de Paul)	S.C.	Archbishop William Walsh	Vincentian-Setonian	1849
Sisters of Charity of Sts. Bartolomea Capitanio and Vincenza Gerosa	S.C.C.G.	St. Bartolomea Capitanio; St. Vincenza Gerosa	Vincentian-Setonian	1832
Sisters of Charity of Seton Hill	S.C.	Mother Aloysia Lowe	Vincentian-Setonian	1870
Sisters of Charity of St. Ann	S.Ch.S.A.		Vincentian-Setonian	
Sisters of Charity of St. Augustine	S.C.A.	Bishop Louis Amadeus Rappe	Augustinian	1851
Sisters of Charity of St. Hyacinthe	S.C.S.H.	Archbishop Joseph Signay	Vincentian-Setonian	1840
Sisters of Charity of St. Joan Antida	S.C.S.J.A.			
Sisters of Charity of St. John of God (India)	S.C.J.G.		Vincentian-Setonian	
Sisters of Charity of St. Paul	S.P.C.	Fr. Louis Chauvet		1696
Sisters of Charity of the -Blessed Virgin Mary	B.V.M.	Mother Mary Frances Clarke	Vincentian-Setonian	1831
Sisters of Charity of the Immaculate Conception	S.C.I.C.	Bishop Thomas-Louis Connolly; Mother Honoria Conway	Vincentian-Setonian	1854
Sisters of Charity of the Incarnate Word of Houston	C.C.V.I.	Bishop Claude Marie Dubuis	Augustinian	1866
Sisters of Charity of the Incarnate Word of San Antonio	C.C.V.I.	Bishop Claude Marie Dubuis; St. Madeleine Chollet	Augustinian	1869
Sisters of Christian Charity	S.C.C.	Blessed Pauline von Mallinckrodt		1849
Sisters of Good News, India	S.G.N.			
Sisters of Holy Cross (Montreal)	C.S.C.		Holy Cross	1847
Sisters of Jesus Crucified	C.J.C.			
Sisters of Jesus, Our Hope	S.J.H.			1992
Sisters of Jesus	S.J.			
Sisters of La Retraite		Mother Catherine de Francheville		1674
Sisters of Life	S.V.	Cardinal John Joseph O'Connor	Augustinian	1991
Sisters of Maria Auxilium, India	S.M.A.			
Sisters of Marie-Auxiliatrice	M.A.	Sophie-Thérèse de Soubiran La Louvière		1864
Sisters of Mary Immaculate	S.M.I.			
Sisters of Mary Queen	C.M.R.			
Sisters of Mary of the Presentation	S.M.P.	Father Joachim Fleury, Mother St. Louis	Vincentian	1828
Sisters of Mary, Mother of the Church	S.M.M.C.	7 Founders in the Diocese of Spokane		2007
Sisters of Mercy in Australia and Papua New Guinea	R.S.M.	Mother Ursula Frayne	Sisters of Mercy	1846
Sisters of Mercy of Newfoundland	R.S.M.		Sisters of Mercy	
Sisters of Mercy of St. Borromeo of Alexandria			Borromean Sisters	1884
Sisters of Mercy of St. Borromeo of Cairo			Borromean Sisters	1904
Sisters of Mercy of St. Borromeo of Emmaus			Borromean Sisters	
Sisters of Mercy of St. Borromeo of Haifa			Borromean Sisters	1888
Sisters of Mercy of St. Borromeo of Jerusalem			Borromean Sisters	1886
Sisters of Mercy of St. Borromeo of Maastricht		Fr. Peter Anton van Baer	Borromean Sisters	1837
Sisters of Mercy of St. Borromeo of Nancy			Borromean Sisters	1626
Sisters of Mercy of St. Borromeo of Prague		Prince-Bishop Alois Josef, Freiherr von Schrenk	Borromean Sisters	1838
Sisters of Mercy of St. Borromeo of Trebnitz		Prince-Bishop Melchior, Freiherr von Diepenbrock	Borromean Sisters	1848
Sisters of Mercy of St. Borromeo of Trier		Nancy Borromean Sisters	Borromean Sisters	1811
Sisters of Mercy of Verona	I.S.M.	Charles Steeb; Luigia Poloni		1840
Sisters of Mercy of the Americas	R.S.M.		Sisters of Mercy	1991
Sisters of Mercy of the Holy Cross (Ingenbohl), India	S.C.S.N.			
Sisters of Mercy of the Union (Great Britain)	R.S.M.		Sisters of Mercy	1976
Sisters of Mercy (Religious Sisters of Mercy)	R.S.M.	Mother Catherine McAuley	Sisters of Mercy	1831
Sisters of Mission Service	S.M.S.	Fr. Godfrey W. Kuckartz, OMI		1951
Sisters of Most Holy Sacrament	S.M.H.S.			
Sisters of Notre Dame de Namur	S.N.D.; S.N.D. de N.	Julie Billiart		1803
Sisters of Notre Dame of Coesfeld	S.N.D.			
Sisters of Our Lady of Consolation			Augustinian	
Sisters of Our Lady of Fatima	F.S.			
Sisters of Our Lady of Mercy, India	O.M.			
Sisters of Our Lady of Mercy	S.O.L.M.			
Sisters of Our Lady of Sion	N.D.S.	Fr. Marie Theodor Ratisbonne; Fr. Marie-Alphonse Ratisbonne	Congregation of Our Lady of Sion	1843
Sisters of Our Lady of Sorrows (Servants of Mary of Pisa), India	O.S.M.			
Sisters of Our Lady of the Garden	O.L.G.			
Sisters of Our lady of Providence, India	O.L.P.			
Sisters of Providence of St. Mary-of-the-Woods	S.P.	Theodore Guerin		1840
Sisters of Providence of St. Vincent de Paul	S.P.	4 Sisters of Charity of Montreal	Vincentian-Setonian	1861
Sisters of Sacred Sciences	S.S.S.	Fr. Antony Kolencherry		1997
Sisters of St. Agnes		Caspar Rehrl		1858
Sisters of Saint Anne	C.S.S.A.	Blessed Marie Anne Blondin		1850
Sisters of St. Casimir	S.S.C.	Mother Maria Kaupas		1907
Sisters of St. Chretienne	S.S.Ch.	Anne Victoire de Mejanes Tailleur		1807
Sisters of St. Dorothy (Dorotheans)	S.S.D.	Paula Frassinetti		1834
Sisters of St. Elizabeth		Mother Dorothea Wolff		1842
Sisters of St. Francis of Rochester, Minnesota		Sister Mary Alfred Moes	Franciscan	1877
Sisters of St. Joseph of Chambéry		Sisters of St. Joseph of Lyons		1812
Sisters of St. Louis	S.S.L.			
Sisters of St. Martha	C.S.M.	Bishop John Cameron	Vincentian-Setonian	1900
Sisters of Social Service	S.S.S.	Mother Margit Slachta	Benedictine	1923
Sisters of St. Rita		Fr. Hugolinus Dach, O.S.A.	Augustinian	1911
Sisters of St. Therese of the Child Jesus (St. Therese Sisters)	S.S.Th.	Maria Crocifissa Curcio		20th century
Sisters of St. Agatha, India	S.S.A.			
Sisters of St. Ann of Providence, India	S.A.(P)			
Sisters of St. Ann	S.S.A.			
Sisters of St. Anne of Tiruchirapalli, India	S.A.T.			
Sisters of St. Anne, Bangalore, India	S.A.B.			
Sisters of St. Benedict of Our Lady of Grace				
Sisters of St. Brigid	S.S.B.			
Sisters of St. Dorothy (Daughters of the Sacred Heart)	D.S.H.S.			
Sisters of St. Francis of Assisi			Franciscan	1849
Sisters of St. Francis of Assisi		37 Franciscan Sisters of Perpetual Adoration	Franciscan	1873
Sisters of St. Francis of Penance and Christian Charity		Mother Magdalen Damen	Franciscan	1835
Sisters of St. Francis of the Martyr St. George	F.S.G.M.	Fr. John Gerard Dall; Mother M. Anselma Bopp	Franciscan	1869
Sisters of St. Joan of Arc			Augustinian	
Sisters of St. John the Baptist and Mary the Queen, India	S.J.B.			
Sisters of St. John the Baptist, India	S.C.J.B.			
Sisters of St. John the Baptist	C.S.J.B.			1876
Sisters of St. Joseph of "St. Marc", India	S.J.S.M.			
Sisters of St. Joseph of Cluny, India	S.J.C.			
Sisters of St. Joseph of Lyons, India	S.J.L.			
Sisters of St. Joseph of Peace	C.S.J.P.	Margaret Anna Cusack		1884
Sisters of St. Joseph of Springfield				
Sisters of St. Joseph of Tarbes	S.J.T.			
Sisters of St. Joseph of the Apparition, India	S.J.A.			
Sisters of St. Joseph of the Apparition		St. Emily de Vialar		1832
Sisters of St. Joseph of the Sacred Heart (Australian Josephites)	R.S.J.			
Sisters of St. Joseph of the Sacred Heart	S.S.J.			1866
Sisters of St. Joseph of the Third Order of St. Francis	S.S.J.-T.O.S.F.	46 members of the School Sisters of St. Francis	Franciscan	1901
Sisters of St. Joseph the Worker	S.J.W.			
Sisters of St. Joseph's Congregation, India	S.J.C.			
Sisters of St Joseph (Sisters of Saint Joseph of Medaille)	C.S.J.	Fr. Jean Paul Médaille		1650
Sisters of St. Maria Magdelena Postel, India	S.M.M.P.			
Sisters of St. Martha, India	C.S.M.			
Sisters of St. Mary of Namur	S.S.M.N.	Fr. Nicholas Minsart		1819
Sisters of St. Mary of Oregon	S.S.M.O.	9 Oregonian women		1886
Sisters of St. Paul Third Order Regular	C.S.P.T.O.R.		Paulist	
Sisters of St. Peter Claver (India)	S.S.P.C.			
Sisters of St. marth's Congregation, India	S.M.C.			
Sisters of the Adoration of the Blessed Sacrament, India	S.A.B.S.			
Sisters of the Apostolic Carmel	A.C.	Mother Veronica of the Passion	Carmelite	1870
Sisters of the Blessed Sacrament	S.B.S.	St. Katharine Drexel		1891
Sisters of the Cenacle	R.C.	Fr. Jean-Pierre Etienne Terme; Mother Thérèse Couderc		1826
Sisters of the Child Jesus of Chauffailles	R.E.J.		Sisters of the Child Jesus	1859
Sisters of the Child Jesus of Le Puy-en-Velay	R.E.J.	Mother Ann-Marie Martel	Sisters of the Child Jesus	1676
Sisters of the Christian Retreat, Chuscian	C.R.			
Sisters of the Cross and Passion	C.S.P.			
Sisters of the Cross and Passion	C.P.	Mother Elizabeth Prout	Passionist	1852
Sisters of the Cross of Chavanod, India	S.C.C.			
Sisters of the Destitute		Fr. Varghese Payyappilly Palakkappilly		1927
Sisters of the Divine Compassion		Mother Mary Veronica		1886
Sisters of the Divine Savior	S.D.S.	Blessed Maria Therese von Wüllenweber; Ven. Francis Mary of the Cross Jordan		1888
Sisters of the Eucharistic Heart of Jesus	E.H.J.			
Congregation of Our Lady of Fidelity	N.D.F.	Mother Henriette le Forestier d'Osseville		1831
Sisters of the Good Samaritan	S.G.S.			
Sisters of the Good Shepherd (Congregation of Our Lady of Charity of the Good Shepherd)	R.G.S.	St. Mary Euphrasia Pelletier	Good Shepherd Sisters	1835
Sisters of the Good Shepherd of Omaha	R.G.S.	Bishop Richard Scannell	Good Shepherd Sisters	1894
Sisters of the Guardian Angel	S.A.C.			
Sisters of the Holy Childhood of Jesus and Mary		Anne-Victoire Méjanes		1807
Sisters of the Holy Cross (Menzingen), India	H.C.M.			
Sisters of the Holy Cross, India	S.H.C.			
Sisters of the Holy Cross	H.C.			
Sisters of the Holy Cross (Indiana)	C.S.C.		Holy Cross	1841
Sisters of the Holy Family (Louisiana)	S.H.F.	Ven. Henriette DeLille		1837
Sisters of the Holy Family of Nazareth, Indiav	S.F.N.			
Sisters of the Holy Family of Nazareth	C.S.F.N.	Franciszka Siedliska		1875
Sisters of the Holy Family of Villefranche	S.F.	St. Émilie de Rodat		1816
Sisters of the Holy Humility of Mary	H.M.	Fr. John Joseph Begel		1856
Sisters of the Holy Names of Jesus and Mary	S.N.J.M.	Marie Rose Durocher		1837
Sisters of the Holy Redeemer	C.S.R.			
Sisters of the Holy Redeemer				
Sisters of the Holy Spirit and Mary Immaculate	S.H.Sp.	Mother Margaret Mary Healy Murphy		1887
Sisters of the Holy Trinity	C.S.S.T.			
Sisters of the Holy Union of the Sacred Hearts	S.U.S.C.	John Baptist Debrabant	Salesian	1828
Sisters of the Imitation of Christ, India	S.I.C.			
Sisters of the Immaculate Conception of Castres		St. Émilie de Villeneuve		19th century
Sisters of the Incarnate Word and Blessed Sacrament, Corpus Christi	I.W.B.S.			
Sisters of the Incarnate Word and Blessed Sacrament	C.V.I.			
Sisters of the Incarnate Word and Blessed Sacrament	S.I.W.			
Sisters of the Infant Jesus	I.J.	Fr. Nicholas Barré		1666
Sisters of the Little Company of Mary	L.C.M.			
Sisters of the Little Flower of Bethany (India)	B.S.			
Sisters of the Living Word, Metairie Louisiana	S.L.W.			
Sisters of the Poor of St. Catherine of Sienna, India	S.D.P.			
Sisters of the Poor, Palazzolo Institute	S.d.P.I.P.	Luigi Maria Palazzolo		1869
Sisters of the Presentation of Mary	P.M.	Blessed Anne-Marie Rivier		1796
Sisters of the Reparation of the Holy Face		Ven. Hildebrand Gregori	Benedictine	1950
Sisters of the Sacred Heart of Jesus, India	S.S.H.J.			
Sisters of the Sacred Heart, India	S.S.H.			
Sisters of the Savior and the Blessed Virgin Mary	C.S.V.B.			
Sisters of the Society Devoted to the Sacred Heart	S.D.S.H.			1941
Sisters of the Society of St. Pius X		Archbishop Marcel Lefebvre		1974
Sisters, Servants of the Immaculate Heart of Mary (Chester County, Pennsylvania)	I.H.M.	St. John Neumann; Mother Marie Theresa Duchemin	Immaculate Heart of Mary	1858
Sisters, Servants of the Immaculate Heart of Mary (Monroe, Michigan)	I.H.M.	Fr. Louis Florent Gillet, C.Ss.R.; Mother Marie Theresa Duchemin; Mother Theresa Maxis	Immaculate Heart of Mary	1845
Sisters, Servants of the Immaculate Heart of Mary (Scranton, Pennsylvania)	I.H.M.		Immaculate Heart of Mary	1871
Sisters, Servants of the Lord and the Virgin of Matará	S.S.V.M.			1988
Sisters, Servants of the Most Sacred Heart of Jesus	S.S.C.J.			1894
Slav Congregation	O.S.B.		Benedictine	1945
Snehagiri Missionary Sisters	S.M.S.	Fr. Abraham Kaippanplackal		1963
Societatis Iesu, Latin for Society of Jesus, Jesuits	S.I.			
Society of African Missions (S.M.A. Fathers)	S.M.A.	Fr. Melchior de Marion Brésillac		1850
Society of Bethlehem Mission Immensee	S.M.B.			1921
Society of Bethlemite Sisters	Bethl.			
Society of Christ (The Society of Christ for Poles Living Abroad)	S.Chr.	Venerable August Hlond; Servant of God Ignacy Posadzy		1932
Society of Daughters of Mary Immaculate, India	D.M.			
Society of Devpriya Sisters, India	D.P.			
Society of Helpers of Mary, India	S.H.M.			
Society of Khristudasis, India	S.K.D.			
Society of Ladies of Mary Immaculate, India	S.L.M.I.			
Society of Marian Servants of Jesus	S.M.S.J.			2010
Society of Nirmaladasi Sisters, India	S.N.D.S.			
Society of Our Lady of Africa, India	S.O.L.A.			
Society of Our Lady of the Most Holy Trinity	S.O.L.T.	Fr. James H. Flanagan	Trinitarian	1958
Society of St. Augustine (Kansas Augustinians)	S.S.A.	4 Augustinian Recollects	Augustinian	1981
Society of St. Edmund (Edmundians)	S.S.E.	Fr. Jean Baptiste Muard		1843
Society of Saint John Vianney	S.S.J.V.			
Society of St. Paul (Paulines)	S.S.P.	Blessed Giacomo Alberione	Pauline	1914
Society of St. Vincent de Paul	S.V.d.P.; S.V.P.; S.S.V.D.P.	Blessed Antoine-Frédéric Ozanam	Vincentian-Setonian	1833
Sulpician Fathers (Society of Saint-Sulpice)	P.S.S.; S.S.^{[in the U.S.]}	Fr. Jean-Jacques Olier		1642
Society of St. John (Societas Sancti Ioannis)	S.S.I.			
Society of St. John	S.S.J.			
Society of St. Pius X	S.S.P.X.	Archbishop Marcel Lefebvre		1970
Society of the Atonement (Atonement Friars, Graymoor Friars)	S.A.			1909
Society of the Divine Word	S.V.D.	St. Arnold Jansen	Arnoldus	1875
Society of the Helpers of the Holy Souls	A.P.; H.H.S.	Blessed Eugenia Smet		1856
Society of the Holy Child Jesus	S.H.C.J.	Mother Cornelia Connelly		1846
Society of the Immaculata	S.I.			
Society of the Missionaries of St. Francis Xavier	S.F.X.	Fr. Jose Mariano Bento Martins		1887
Society of the Missionary Servants of the Poor	M.S.o.P.			2008
Society of the Oblates of Mary at the Foot of the Cross	M.F.C.			
Society of the Sacred Heart of the Infant Jesus	S.C.J.			
Society of the Sacred Heart	R.S.C.J.	St. Madeleine Sophie Barat		1800
Society of the Sisters of St. Ann (Luzen), India	S.A.S.			
Société des Missions-Étrangères du Québec	P.M.E.			1921
Sodality of Christian Life (Sodalicio de Vida Christiana)	S.C.V.			1971
Solesmes Congregation	O.S.B.	Pope Gregory XVI	Benedictine	1837
Sons of Divine Providence	F.D.P.			
Sons of Mary Health of the Sick	F.M.S.I	Fr. Edward F. Garesche, SJ		1952
Sons of Merciful Love	F.A.M.	Sr. Esperanza Jesus Alhama Valera		1951
Sons of the Holy Family	S.F.	Fr. Josep Manyanet i Vives		1864
Sororem Franciscalium ab Immaculata Conceptione a Beata Matre Dei	S.F.I.C.			
Sovereign Military Order of Malta	S.M.O.M.	Blessed Gerard Thom		1099
Spanish Institute of St. Francis Xavier for Foreign Missions	I.E.M.E.		Xaverian	
Stigmatines (Congregation of the Sacred Stigmata)	C.S.S.	St. Gaspar Bertoni		1816
Subiaco Cassinese Congregation	O.S.B.	Dom Pietro Casaretto	Benedictine	1867
Swiss Congregation	O.S.B.		Benedictine	1602
Swiss-American Congregation	O.S.B.	Pope Leo XIII	Benedictine	1881
Sylvestrine Congregation	O.S.B. Silv.	St. Sylvester Gozzolini	Benedictine	1231
T
Taborite Nuns of Mary Immaculate				
Tertiary Sisters of St. Francis – Cameroon	T.O.S.F.			1935
Tertiary Sisters of St. Francis		Mother Maria Heuber	Franciscan	1700
Teutonic Knights (Order of Brothers of the German House of Saint Mary in Jerusalem, German Order)	O.S.M.T.		Teutonic Order	1192
Third Order of Saint Dominic	T.O.P.			
The Sisters of the Sacred Heart and of the Poor (Hermanas de la Sagrada Corazon y los Pobres)	H.S.C.P.			
Third Order Secular of the Most Holy Trinity	O.SS.T. Ter.		Trinitarian	
Trappist Nuns (Cistercian Nuns of Strict Observance)			Benedictine	
Trappists (Order of Cistercians of Strict Observance)	O.C.S.O.	Abbott Armand Jean le Bouthillier de Rancé	Benedictine	1664
Trinitarians (Order of the Most Holy Trinity for the Redemption of the Captives)	O.S.S.T.	St. John of Matha	Trinitarian	Late 12th century
Trinitarian Sisters of Valence (Congregation Sisters of the Most Holy Trinity)	C.S.S.T.	Four women from Saint-Nizier-de-Fornas	Trinitarian	1660
Trinitarians of Mary		Mother Lillie	Trinitarian	1992
U
Union of St. Catherine of Siena, India	M.D.S.			
Ursuline Franciscan Sisters	U.F.S.		Ursuline, Franciscan	
Ursuline Sisters (Society of St. Ursula)	S.U.		Ursuline	
Ursuline Sisters (Company of St. Ursula)	O.S.U.	St. Angela Merici	Ursuline	1535
Ursuline Sisters of Bruno	O.S.U.		Ursuline	
Ursuline Sisters of Prelate	O.S.U.	Fr. Joseph Riedinger	Ursuline	1919
Ursuline Sisters of Somasca	U.S.S.		Ursuline	
Ursuline Sisters of Tildonk	O.S.U.		Ursuline	
Ursuline Sisters of the Blessed Virgin Mary	O.S.V.		Ursuline	
Ursulines of Jesus	U.J.		Ursuline	
Ursulines of Mary Immaculate	U.M.I.		Ursuline	
Ursuline Nuns (Order of St. Ursula)	O.S.U.	St. Angela Merici	Ursuline	1535
V
Vallumbrosan Order		St. John Gualbert	Benedictine	11th century
Venerini Sisters (Religious Teachers Venerini)	M.P.V.	St. Rose Venerini		1685
Verbum Dei Missionary Fraternity	M.V.D.F.	Fr. Jaime Bonet		1963
Viatorians (Clerics of Saint Viator)	C.S.V.	Fr. Louis Querbes		1831
Victory Noll Sisters	O.L.V.M.			
Visitation Sisters (Order of the Visitation of Holy Mary, Visitandines)	V.H.M.	St. Francis de Sales; St. Jane Frances de Chantal	Salesian	1610
Visitation Sisters (Sisters of the Visitation Congregation of the Blessed Virgin Mary)	S.V.M.		Vincentian-Setonian	
Visitation Sisters of Don Bosco	V.S.D.B.			
Vocationist Fathers (Society of Divine Vocations)	S.D.V.			
Virgo Flos Carmeli	E.P.	Msgr. João Scognamiglio Clá Dias	Heralds of the Gospel	2005
W
White Sisters (Missionary Sisters of Our Lady of Africa)	M.S.O.L.A.	Cardinal Charles Lavigerie	Missionaries of Africa	1869
Work of Mary Mediatrix (Opus Mariae Mediatricis)	O.M.M.			
Workers of the Kingdom of Christ	C.O.R.C.	Bishop Enrique Amezcua Medina; Bishop José Abraham Martínez Betancourt; Archbishop Manuel Pío López Estrada		1963
X
Xaverian Brothers (Congregation of St. Francis Xavier)	C.F.X.	Br. Theodore Ryken	Xaverian	1839
Xaverian Missionaries (Pious Society of St. Francis Xavier for Foreign Missions)	S.X.	St. Guido Maria Conforti	Xaverian	1895
Xaverian Missionaries of Yarumal	M.X.Y.		Xaverian	
Xaverian Missionary Sisters of Mary (Missionary Society of Mary)	S.X.	Fr. James Spagnolo; Ven. Celestina Bottego	Xaverian	1898
Z
Zirc Cistercian Congregation	O.S.B.		Benedictine	1923

== See also ==
- List of defunct Catholic religious institutes
