= Moisés Lira Serafín =

Beatified Mexican priest (1893–1950

Blessed Moisés Lira Serafín MSPS
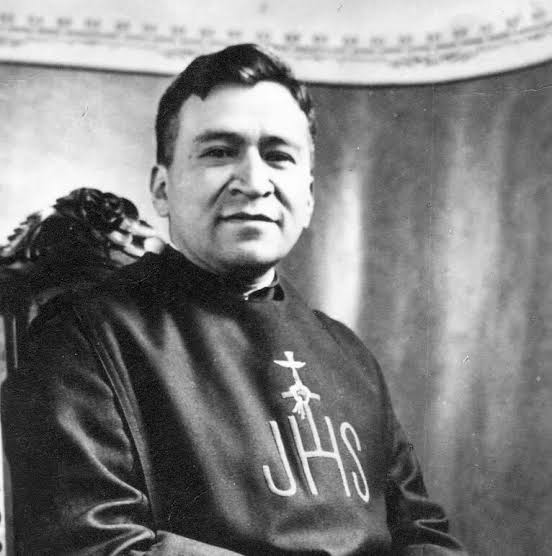

Priest
- Born: 16 September 1893; Tlatempa, Zacatlán, Mexico
- Died: 25 June 1950 (aged 56); Mexico City, Mexico
- Venerated in: Catholic Church
- Feast: 25 June
- Patronage: MSPS

Blessed Moisés Lira Serafín (16 September 1893 – 25 June 1950) was a Mexican priest who founded the Congregation of the Missionaries of Charity of Mary Immaculate.

== Biography ==
Moisés Lira Serafín was born in Tlatempa, Zacatlán, Mexico, on 16 September 1893. He was the founder of the Congregation of the Missionaries of Charity of Mary Immaculate. His mother died when he was 5 years old, an event that would mark his life. His father was a teacher and traveled with him widely. He studied at the Palafoxiano Seminary in Puebla and later, in 1914, entered the Congregation of the Missionaries of the Holy Spirit at the personal invitation of the Congregation's founder, Father Félix de Jesús Rougier. He was the first member of this congregation, in which he professed his vows on 4 February 1917. Five years later he was ordained a priest, on 14 May 1922. He experienced part of the religious persecution in Mexico and emigrated to Rome, where he lived until 1928. On 29 March 1934, he founded the congregation of the Missionaries of Charity of Mary Immaculate.

== Veneration ==
His beatification process began in 2000 and was submitted to the Vatican on 25 October 2001. On Holy Thursday 2013, Pope Francis authorized the Congregation for the Causes of Saints to issue the decree recognizing his "heroic virtues" and granting him the title of venerable; this was the first step toward canonization.

== Beatification ==
On 14 December 2023, Pope Francis authorized the promulgation of the decree for the beatification of Venerable Moisés Lira Serafín following the miracle attributed to his intercession. He was beatified on Saturday, 14 September 2024, at the Basilica of Santa María de Guadalupe, in Mexico City, during a mass presided over by Cardinal Marcello Semeraro.
