= Sisters Minor =

Sisters Minor (Latin: Sorores Minores) may refer to:

- Order of Saint Clare (Poor Clares)
- Sisters Minor of Mary Immaculate
