= Oblates of Jesus the Priest =

Mexican Roman Catholic religious congregation

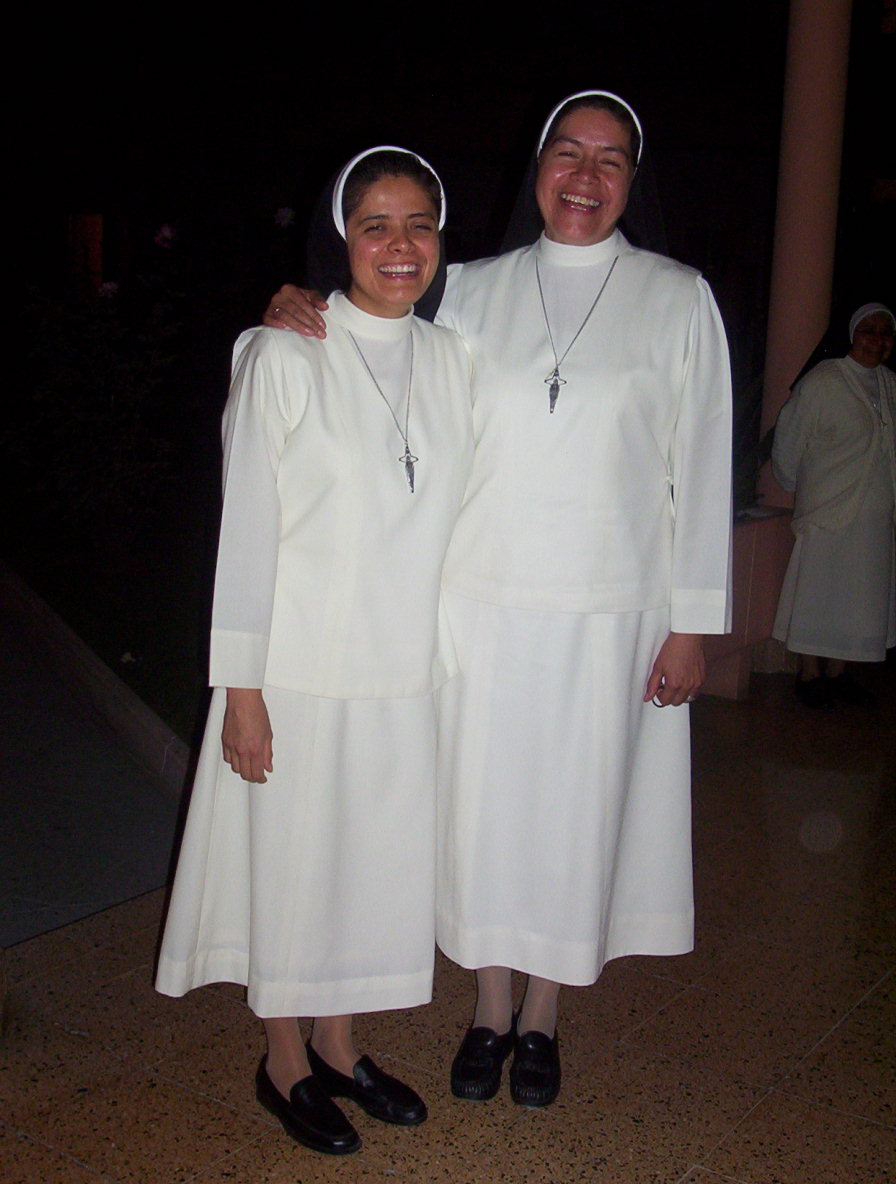
Two Oblates at their fellow sisters’ ceremony of vows.

The Oblates of Jesus the Priest is a Roman Catholic religious congregation of sisters. Founded in Mexico in 1924, it is now represented in Mexico, the United States, Italy, and Ecuador. Their charism is “to love the priesthood and to make it loved,” so the apostolates of the sisters predominantly center on assisting priests and promoting the priesthood. These include, but are not limited to, ministering in seminaries, aiding retired priests, sewing vestments, assisting in rectories, working as secretaries for bishops, and conducting religious education in some parishes. The Oblate sisters are also very musical, emphasizing singing and playing instruments during their liturgies and sometimes writing their own music.

The prayer life of the order is especially Eucharistic with at least a half hour of Eucharistic adoration every day for each sister, as well as daily Mass, Liturgy of the Hours, and Rosary. As this congregation is part of the Family of the Cross, their spirituality is centered on the Spirituality of the Cross. Essentially, this spirituality emphasizes that Jesus was both priest and victim when he died on the cross, and so by uniting oneself with him, even in the mundane events of daily life, it is possible to also be mediators and offerings to God. The motto of the order is “In Oblation to the Lord”. Currently, the number of sisters worldwide is close to 120, with thirteen of their twenty convents located in Mexico. In the United States, the sisters, numbering around 22, can be found in the archdioceses of Chicago, New York, and San Francisco.

== History ==
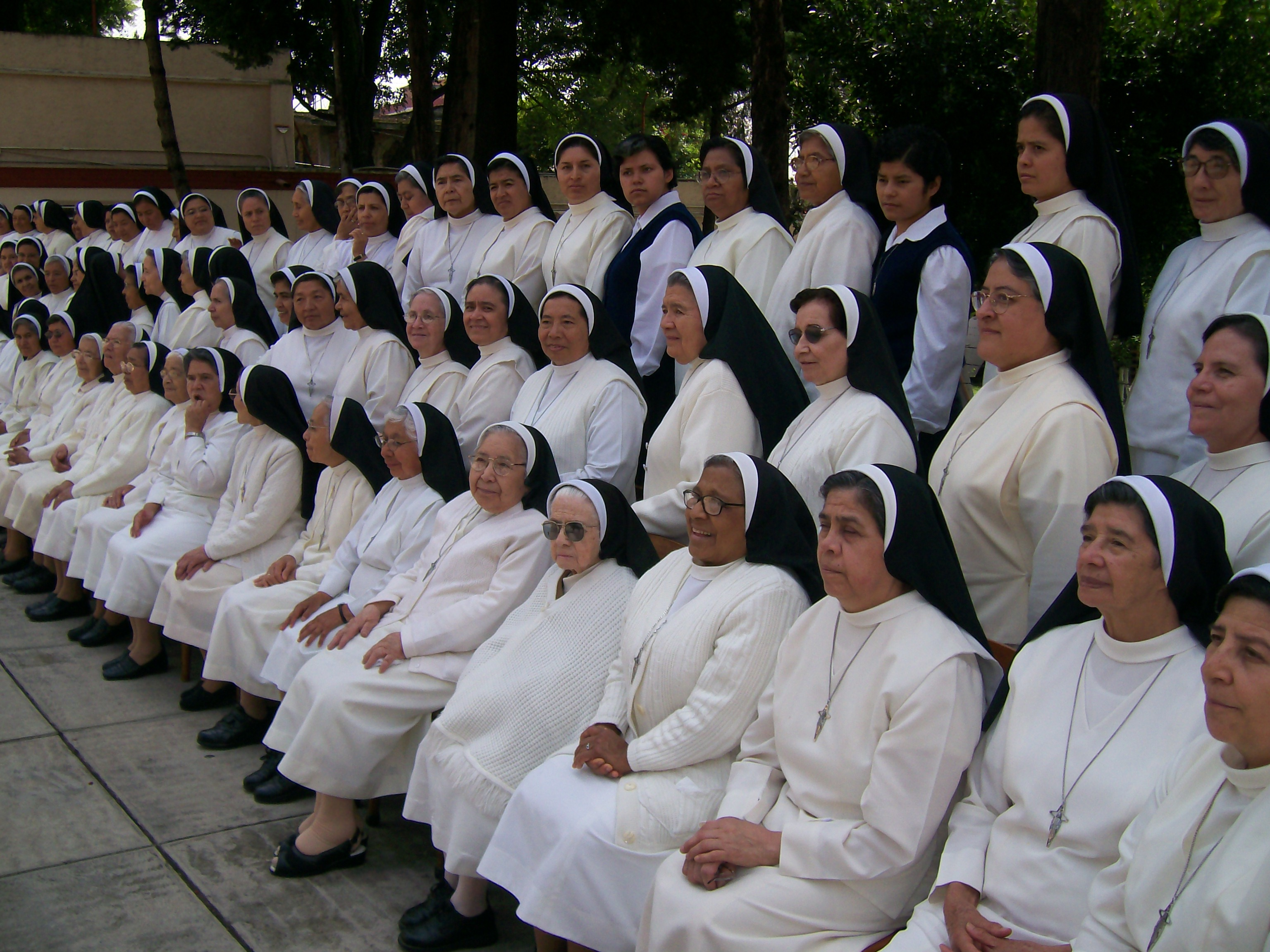
Every July the Oblate sisters worldwide reunite at their motherhouse in Mexico City (2007).

The Oblates of Jesus the Priest was founded in Mexico City on February 9, 1924, by Félix de Jesús Rougier, a French priest who first came to Mexico as a missionary in 1902. Rougier founded four congregations, including the men’s community known as the Missionaries of the Holy Spirit (1914) and three women’s congregations: the Daughters of the Holy Spirit (1924), the Guadalupan Missionaries of the Holy Spirit (1930) and the Oblates of Jesus the Priest. The Oblates were founded in Tlalpan, Mexico City, on February 9, 1924. They first became an association of the faithful on January 31, 1935, and on December 12, 1937, was approved as a congregation of diocesan right. On February 12, 1975, the Holy See elevated the congregation to the rank of institute of pontifical right.

Rougier was originally a priest of the Society of Mary; his superiors eventually gave him permission to join the community that he founded for men. He was aided by a widow and mystic named Concepcion Cabrera de Armida, or "Conchita" who wrote about 200 volumes of spiritual writings. Shortly after it became an official congregation, Rougier died on January 10, 1938. He and Cabrera de Armida were both made venerable by Pope John Paul II – she on December 20, 1999 and Rougier on February 15, 2000. As of 2014 the Family of the Cross included eighteen religious and lay institutes.

== Beliefs and practices ==
The sisters are particularly devoted to the magisterium and the Pope. They participate in the March for Life and Walk for Life. In the United States, they have chosen not to participate in either the Leadership Conference of Women Religious or the Council of Major Superiors of Women Religious.
