= Lovers of the Holy Cross =

Federation of Vietnamese Roman Catholic orders

Congregation of the Lovers of the Holy Cross
- Dòng Mến Thánh Giá
- Abbreviation: LHC
- Formation: 1670; 356 years ago
- Founders: Pierre Lambert de la Motte
- Founded at: Kiên Lao, Vietnam
- Members: 4,822 (2002)
- Parent organization: Catholic Church

The Lovers of the Holy Cross (French: Amantes de la Croix, Vietnamese: Dòng Mến Thánh Giá) is a federation of a number of congregations of diocesan right of religious sisters, founded in 1670 by the first Vicar Apostolic in Tonkin and Cochinchina, Pierre Lambert de la Motte, M.E.P. According to 2002 statistics, it has about 4,822 members.

It is the first female religious congregation to be distinguished by its East Asian characteristics, both contemplative and active, and founded in Vietnam. During its 335 years of existence, the Lovers of the Holy Cross community, have gone through various trials and tribulations: persecutions, disasters, wars, and changes of political regimes.

As of 2005, there were 24 autonomous congregations of the Lovers of the Holy Cross Sisters. In addition to their native Vietnam, there is one congregation in the United States, three in Thailand and two in Laos.
