= Dominican Sisters of Mary, Mother of the Eucharist =

Female Catholic religious institute based in Ann Arbor, Michigan

The Dominican Sisters of Mary, Mother of the Eucharist, is a Catholic female religious institute of diocesan right, rather than Pontifical right, based in Ann Arbor, Michigan which follows the charism of the Dominican Order. The congregation was founded in 1997 by four members of the Dominican Sisters of St. Cecilia in Nashville, Tennessee. As of 2021, it has 155 members.

== History ==
In 1996 Pope John Paul II wrote Apostolic Exhortation Vita consecrata, calling for a renewal of religious life. Inspired by his words, Mother Mary Assumpta Long, former superior of the Nashville-based Dominican Sisters of St. Cecilia, and three other sisters of the community, Sr. Joseph Andrew Bogdanowicz Sr. Mary Samuel Handwerker and Sr. John Dominic Rasmussen, set off to "undertake a new initiative". On February 9, 1997, John Cardinal O'Connor established the new foundation as a "Public Association of Christ's Faithful" in the Roman Catholic Archdiocese of New York. After their canonical establishment, the Sisters accepted an invitation by Bishop Carl Frederick Mengeling to teach in the Roman Catholic Diocese of Lansing and began to administer the Spiritus Sanctus Academies located in Ann Arbor, Michigan and Plymouth, Michigan.

In 2010, the congregation announced that it had agreed to buy the Pope John Paul II Cultural Center in Washington, D.C., to be used as a house of studies, but withdrew from the purchase in 2011 to concentrate on building their new priory in the diocese of Austin, Texas.

== Apostolate ==
The community's apostolate is Catholic education. They currently run the Spiritus Sanctus Academies, private and independent K-8 Catholic Schools in the Diocese of Lansing, Michigan, and also have groups of sisters teaching at both the elementary and secondary levels in the American dioceses of Austin, Columbus, Gallup, Peoria, Phoenix, Rockville Centre, Sacramento, and Saint Paul and Minneapolis, as well as the Personal Ordinariate of the Chair of Saint Peter in Houston, Texas, and, internationally, in Rome, Italy.

Additionally, they also offer spiritual retreats and spread the Christian faith by giving talks at such places as colleges, universities, Catholic groups, and vocation fairs. The sisters also host a catechetical series on EWTN entitled "Truth in the Heart" for elementary school-age children.

== Spirituality ==
The Sisters "fully embrace the charism and spirituality of the Order of Preachers". The Sisters have a devotion to the Real Presence of Christ in the Holy Eucharist; as such, Eucharistic Adoration is an important part of their spirituality. They also have a "total filial entrustment to Mary, the Mother of God".

== Current status ==
As of 2021, the sisters' Motherhouse in Ann Arbor counts over 100 sisters, with an average age of 32. The average entering age is 21. The Sisters are currently expanding geographically, with domestic missions in California, Arizona, New Mexico, Texas, Missouri, Minnesota, Illinois, Michigan, Ohio, and New York, as well as Rome, Italy, with their Motherhouse in Michigan at full capacity.

In October 2012, the Sisters moved the novitiate into Saint Felix House in Huntington, Indiana, as a temporary measure whilst seeking to further develop the expansion and building of a new property in Austin, Texas. The sisters numbered over 120 in 2012. Plans to develop their priory in Loomis, California, were put on hold in early 2013, but in April 2013 they announced that as of the 2013–14 academic year they would have a small convent located in a section of Casa Santa Maria, the original building of the North American College in Rome.

== In popular media ==
The Sisters were profiled twice on The Oprah Winfrey Show in 2010.

The Sisters are featured on the show American Bible Challenge during the season premiere on March 21, 2012.

Since 2014, they have been creating and selling educational videos for children, now under the auspices of a production company they created and named Openlight Media, which includes two full studios in the Spiritus Sanctus Academy in Ann Arbor. They also produce a podcast, "Dominican Sisters Open Mic", and host a YouTube channel under the Openlight Media name.

== See also ==
- List of Catholic religious institutes
