= Glenmary Home Missioners =

Roman Catholic society of apostolic life

- Established: 1939; 87 years ago
- Type: Society of Apostolic Life of Pontifical Right (for Men)
- Purpose: Dedicated to establishing a Catholic presence in rural areas and small towns of the United States where the Catholic Church is not yet effectively present.
- Headquarters: 4119 Glenmary Trace, Fairfield, PO Box 465618, Cincinnati, OH 45246-5618, USA
- Members: 51 members (31 priests) (2016)
- Founder: Rev. William Howard Bishop
- President: Fr. Daniel Dorsey, G.H.M.
- Affiliations: Catholic church
- Website: Glenmary

Glenmary Home Missioners, also known as The Home Missioners of America Inc.; Latin: Societas Missionariorum Domesticorum Americæ), is a Catholic society of priests and brothers founded in 1939 to serve the spiritual and material needs of people in rural parts of the United States. It is a society of apostolic life for men.

== History ==
Glenmary Home Missioners was founded in 1939 by Fr William Howard Bishop, a Catholic priest from the Archdiocese of Baltimore. Fr. Bishop was invited by Archbishop John Timothy McNicholas, OP of the Archdiocese of Cincinnati to found the community within archdiocese. At that time, he noted that more than one-third of the counties of the United States, mostly in Appalachia and the South, had no resident priest. Glenmary's name comes from combining the name of the place where the Society was founded, Glendale, Ohio, with the name of Mary, the society's patroness under her title "Our Lady of the Fields."

Throughout the 1940s and until his death in 1953, Bishop's mission theology broadened. In February 1952 he wrote, “I am convinced that side by side with the great convert-making purpose, there is another objective ... to lift up and improve the moral lives of the people around us, regardless of their beliefs or lack of beliefs; regardless, even whether they will ever accept the Faith or not.”

Father Bishop also founded the Home Mission Sisters of America (a.k.a. Glenmary Sisters) in 1941, two years after the founding of the order of priests and brothers. Both the men's and women's communities were founded in Glendale, which is near Cincinnati, Ohio, and both have devotion to Mary under her title "Our Lady of the Fields."

== Purpose ==
Glenmary priests, brothers, and co-workers are Catholic missionaries who serve Catholic missions and ministries in 11 different dioceses in the United States. Glenmary serves the spiritual and material needs of the Catholic minority, the unchurched, and the poor by establishing the Catholic Church in small-town and rural America. At various times Glenmary has served rural areas in dioceses north to Pennsylvania and Ohio, south to Georgia and Alabama, and west to Texas and Oklahoma. However, more recently, Glenmary finds itself concentrated in Appalachia and the South. As of 2017, Glenmary Missioners staffs 10 missions in Appalachia and the rural South.

In the Southern United States, 173 counties have no Catholic congregation. Another 196 have a Catholic congregation but no resident pastoral minister.

== Charism ==
The charism of the Glenmary Home Missioners is to establish a Catholic presence in rural areas and small towns of the United States where the Catholic Church is not yet effectively present, especially in Appalachia, the South and Southwest. AKA Mission-Land USA. Glenmary ministers where Catholics number less than one 1% of the population and the poverty level is twice the national average. Glenmary's plan of action is to establish a mission church in a particular county and nurture it until it reaches a level that it can be close to self-sustaining, at which time it will be turned over to the local diocese as a regular (non-mission) parish. Glenmary has established more than 100 mission churches that have been turned over to local dioceses.

As "Congregation of the Apostolic Life", the group seeks to balance its specific apostolic charism of missionary outreach with a life lived in community which provides necessary mutual friendship, prayer, and support. As with all Congregations of Apostolic Life, the apostolic work takes priority.

== Activities ==
Glenmary Missioners proclaim and witness to the Good News of Jesus Christ and the power of God's love, mercy and justice. In addition they serve the spiritual and material needs of those living in some of the most impoverished counties in the South and Appalachia.

For more than 40 years, Glenmary has operated the Glenmary Group Volunteer Program. Originally located in rural Lewis County, Kentucky, it has offered a retreat-like immersion service experience for high school, college and parish groups. Each group typically works at the program for several days to a week, building and repairing low-income homes, assisting local residents with projects around their property or visiting elderly or remote residents, in an environment of simple living. The Group Volunteer Program is now located in Grainger County, Tennessee, on Joppa Mountain, and is known as "Toppa Joppa."

The Glenmary Research Center (GRC) provides applied research to Glenmary leadership, individual missioners, Church leaders, and the wider society. The GRC supplies maps, religious demographics, religious congregation and religious census information.

== Governance ==
Every four years a "Chapter" is held. The Chapter is made up of all the members who wish to attend, a "chapter of the whole." During the week or more that the Chapter is in session, this is the highest ruling body within the society. It will elect a new Council of a President, First Vice President, and Second Vice President. The Chapter reviews, and accepts or rejects various reports on the financial budget and audit, on common life as members, and on missionary outreach. It may change the "Directory" and amend the "Glenmary Constitution." Directory changes take place at whatever date is selected during the chapter. Constitutional changes must first be approved by Rome. The Chapter may give mandates of action to the new Council.

When the Chapter ends, the newly elected Council becomes the principal governing body of the society. Power is focused in the person of the President, but before making a decision he usually must consult with his two fellow members, and sometimes get at least one of them to agree with him in matters which the Constitution describes as "deliberative." A General Assembly usually meets once a year in person and once a year electronically, to advise the Council and to make a few deliberative decisions.

On a geographical level, members are grouped into "Districts," for mutual support and decision making. When other co-workers are included, these local groups are called "Clusters."

== Glenmary Sisters ==
The Glenmary Sisters were founded in 1941 by Father William Howard Bishop and canonically approved in 1952. Since 1941, the Sisters have established missions in the impoverished and rural areas of the South and Appalachia, where they help people become self-supportive and break the reins of poverty. As of 2018 Sisters are missioned in western and eastern Kentucky, and southern Missouri. The central office is in Owensboro, Kentucky.

Among other ministries, the Sisters run a food bank in rural Missouri and tutor persons preparing for their GED.

The Glenmary Home Missioners and Glenmary Sisters are part of the consortium of Roman Catholic mission organizations that have worked together to launch www.Mission.Education.org., a website that provides information and resources about the missionary work of the Church both overseas and here at home: volunteer service, immersion experiences, adopt-a-mission programs, evangelization, inculturation, human rights, prayer and contemplation.

== See also ==
- Consecrated life
- Institutes of consecrated life
- Religious institute (Catholic)
- Secular institute
- Vocational Discernment in the Catholic Church
