= Missionaries of the Poor =

Catholic religious order based in Kingston, Jamaica

- Missionarii Pauperum (Latin)
- Abbreviation: Post-nominal letters: MOP
- Formation: 19 July 1981; 44 years ago
- Founder: Very Rev Fr. Richard Ho Lung, M.O.P., O.J.
- Founded at: Kingston, Jamaica
- Type: Lay Religious Congregation of Pontifical Right (for Men)
- Headquarters: 3 North Street, Kingston, Jamaica
- Members: 402 members (14 priests) as of 2020
- Superior General: Br. Anil Minj, M.O.P.
- Affiliations: Roman Catholic Church
- Website: https://missionariesofthepoor.org

The Missionaries of the Poor (Latin: Missionarii Pauperum) is a Roman Catholic monastic religious institute of Brothers and Sisters dedicated to "Joyful Service with Christ on the Cross" to serve the poorest of the poor. Its members use the nominal letters MOP (which is the acronym of its Latin name) after their names to indicate membership in the congregation. It was started in 1981 by the Very Reverend Father Richard Ho Lung in Kingston, Jamaica, and has now grown to over 550 members from 13 countries.

== Description ==
The brothers and sisters, who give away all personal belongings, take vows of poverty, chastity, obedience and free service to the least of our brothers and sisters. Everything is done in community including praying, eating, sleeping, and traveling. All their daily activities revolve around prayer, service and worship. More than just giving aid with food, clothing and shelter, the Missionaries of the Poor are dedicated to building up the Church and spreading the Faith. Dedicated to the Holy Rosary, they wear the beads on their sashes, and it was on the feast of the Holy Rosary in 1997 that the Holy See recognized them as a religious community. In November, 2014, the Vatican elevated the MOP to an Institute of Pontifical Right.

One of the most striking characteristics of the life and work of the institute is the award-winning Caribbean-style Christian music which its members perform. Most songs are written by Father Ho Lung and performed by Father Ho Lung & Friends. The music generates revenue for the mission.

Ho Lung stepped down as leader of MOP in 2014, with Brother Augusto Silot succeeding him. Ho Lung was awarded the Order of Jamaica in October 2018 in honour of his work. Succeeding Brother Augusto was Brother Anil Minj.

== Locations ==
The institute's headquarters is in Kingston, Jamaica, where it maintains seven mission homes for destitute persons, including abandoned sick, disabled, or dying men, women, infants, and children. It also operates in India (Andhra Pradesh and Orissa), the Philippines (Naga City and Cebu and Manila), Haiti (Cap-Haïtien and Port-au-Prince), Uganda (Kampala), Kenya (Nairobi), (Indonesia), (East Timor), and the United States (Monroe, North Carolina).

== See also ==
- Missionaries of Charity
