= Missionaries of the Gospel of Life =

The Missionaries of the Gospel of Life is a lay Catholic association affiliated with Priests for Life.

On December 12, 2005 Bishop John Yanta of the Roman Catholic Diocese of Amarillo, in Texas, United States approved a society of apostolic life that was founded by Fr. Frank Pavone dedicated to the protection of the unborn and most vulnerable in society.

In 2008, it was agreed by Priests for Life and the Diocese of Amarillo that the Missionaries of the Gospel of Life would cease to be a society of apostolic life, but would continue as an association of the faithful.
