= Augustinian Sisters, Servants of Jesus and Mary =

The Augustinian Sisters, Servants of Jesus and Mary was founded in Frosinone in 1827 by Maria Teresa Spinelli. They follow the Rule of St. Augustine.
