= Sisters of Mercy of St. Charles Borromeo =

Female Catholic congregation

The Sisters of Mercy of St. Charles Borromeo, also known as the Sisters of Mercy of St. Borromeo, the Borromean Sisters or the Borromeans, are one of several religious congregations for women in the Roman Catholic Church, sharing the same rule and tradition.

== History ==
They were originally established in 1626 as a pious association of women formed in 1626 for the care of the sick in the hospital of St. Charles at Nancy. In 1652, they adopted constitutions drawn up by Epiphane Louys, Abbot of Estivals and Vicar General of the reformed Premonstratensians, and placed themselves under the patronage of Saint Charles Borromeo.

By the middle of the 18th century, the congregation was in charge of numerous hospitals, and shortly afterwards took up as an additional task the Christian education of children. During the French Revolutionary period the members, although dispersed and deprived of their religious habit, continued their work so heroically as to win the encomiums of their persecutors. On 22 July 1804, they resumed their wearing of the habit, having obtained the approval of Napoleon, and were soon in a flourishing condition.

== Organisation and branching ==
Their rule, based on the rule of St. Augustine, received papal approbation in 1859, and additional constitutions were confirmed by Leo XIII in 1892. Their work includes the direction of all manner of charitable institutions, such as domestic and trade schools, protectories, poor-houses, as well as the care of the sick. They also have charge of schools, including several normal institutes in Austria. Candidates must spend one year as postulants and from three to four and a half years as novices before being admitted to the congregation. The auxiliary sisters for the care of the sick renew their vows annually.

In 1848 Melchior Freiherr von Diepenbrock, Prince-Bishop of Breslau, invited the Prague Borromeans to found a house at Neisse, which, in 1857, was raised to the rank of the mother house of a separate congregation. Later the mother house was transferred to Trebnitz, and temporarily, during the Kulturkampf, to Teschen, where a provincial house for imperial Austria was later established (1889).

A house of this congregation founded at Alexandria in 1884 was, in 1894, made a provincial mother-house and a novitiate for the (Ottoman) Orient, with the direction of schools, an asylum for the aged, and a hospice for German pilgrims. Affiliated foundations have been made at Jerusalem (1886), Haifa (1888), Cairo (1904), and Emmaus. The members of the Trebnitz congregation numbered 1900, in 211 houses c. 1910.

In 1811 a foundation was made from Nancy at Trier whence the congregation spread to other cities in western Germany. In 1849 a provincial house was erected at Trier which by decree of Pope Pius IX, was made the mother-house of an independent congregation. A famous Borromean institution is St. Hedwig Hospital in Berlin, founded in 1846 by Angelika Eschweiler. The Trier branch comprises over 1200 sisters in 70 houses.

A foundation was also made at Maastricht (Dutch province of Limburg) in 1837 by Peter Anton van Baer.

=== Prague ===
The Congregation of the Sisters of Mercy of St. Borromeo first came from France to Bohemia in 1837 at the invitation of Alois Josef, Freiherr von Schrenk, Prince-Bishop of Prague. They established a hospital and nursing school on Petřín Hill below the Strahov Garden and soon became one of the most numerous and significant congregations in Bohemia. The Prague community was confirmed as a separate congregation in 1841. The main activities of the Borromeo Sisters are health care and services for the elderly.
