= Verbum Dei Missionary Fraternity =

Catholic missionary institute

- Abbreviation: F.M.V.D.
- Formation: 1963; 63 years ago
- Founder: Fr. Jaime Bonet Bonet, F.M.V.D.
- Type: Institute of Consecrated Life of Pontifical Right (for Men and Women)
- Headquarters: Via Placido Zurla, 41/A, 00176 Roma, Italy
- Members: 523 (77 Priests) (2017)
- President: Fr. Rodrigo Carrizo Moya, F.M.V.D.
- Website: verbumdei.org

The Verbum Dei Missionary Fraternity (Spanish: Fraternidad Misionera Verbum Dei) is an institute of consecrated life of the Catholic Church dedicated to missionary work.

== History ==
It was founded on 17 January 1963, in the Spanish island of Mallorca, by Father Jaime Bonet. The community was ecclesiastically approved as a new form of Consecrated Life of pontifical right, by Pope John Paul II on 15 April 2000. According to the constitutions endorsed on that date their mission is to announce the Word of God and to propagate the Kingdom of God through prayer, the ministry of the Word, and the testimony of evangelical life. The community consists of consecrated women, consecrated men (brothers and priests), and consecrated married couples according to their state. The name, Verbum Dei, is Latin for "Word of God".

The mission of the VDMF is to promote the greatest dignity for all people by empowering individuals and communities to partake in the journey of Christian discipleship. This discipleship is forged in a spirituality rooted in Scripture and Catholic tradition that leads to witnessing to universal fratarnety made visible through community. All celibate members of the community go through several years of academic study of philosophy and theology as that which takes place in a Catholic priestly seminary. The daily life of a missionary involves several hours of silent contemplative prayer.

The Verbum Dei's ministerial work within the Catholic Church includes but is not limited to: Retreat Ministry for all ages and levels (Liturgical Seasons, Women’s Retreats, Men’s Retreats, Married Couples Retreats, Young Adult Retreats, Teenager Retreats, Vocational Discernment Retreats, Silent Contemplative Retreats), Scripture - Based Prayer Groups, Lay Leadership Formation, Lay Preaching Formations and Workshops, Parish Ministry, Pastoral Care for Individuals and Families, Spiritual Accompaniment, Theological Certificate or Diploma (offered only in some communities in the world), and University Campus Ministry.

Across the five continents the institute involves people of different states and areas of life: single and married, old and young, of different backgrounds and occupations. The community encourages people who feel called to the Verbum Dei spirituality or experience themselves nourished by the Verbum Dei charism to commit to a discipleship group or a regular "revision of life" group in order to deepen their relationship with God personally and in a community of faith. There is also a focus on working with university students and young adults to help nurture a stronger Catholic identity and spirituality among the younger generation of the Church that works towards God's Reign of justice, peace, compassion and love in the world of today. Quite a few consecrated members of the fraternity work as Catholic chaplains in many universities.

The Verbum Dei Missionary Fraternity is active over 30 countries in the world. The following are some countries the Verbum Dei is present in: England, Germany, Italy, Portugal, Russia, Spain, Argentina, Bolivia, Brazil, Chile, Colombia, Ecuador, Costa Rica, Honduras, Mexico, Peru, United States, Venezuela, Cameroon, the D.R. of Congo, Equatorial Guinea, Côte d'Ivoire (the Ivory Coast), Australia, the Philippines, Singapore, and Taiwan. For periods of time the community has been present in France, Belgium, Ireland, Poland, Hong Kong, and elsewhere.
