= Missionaries of Mary =

The Missionaries of Mary is a community of apostolate established as a Pious Union in the Roman Catholic Diocese of Novaliches in MetroManila, Philippines. Founded in the Diocese of Balanga Bataan, the Missionaries of Mary were approved by Archbishop Socrates Villegas who was succeeded by Bishop Ruperto Santos.

In 2013 when the Missionaries of Mary left Balanga to return to Metro Manila, the Bishop of Novaliches, Antonio R. Tobias, approved the Missionaries of Mary (MoM) as a pious association of the faithful. Founded by the sisters Sophie Renoux, Edit Fabian, Rachel Luxford, and Laetitia Gorczyca, the group is devoted to the pastoral care of young girls who are marred by experiences of abuse, violence and youth, commonly called "Children in conflict with the law".

The Missionaries of Mary are part of the Montfort Spiritual Family. The Lay Missionaries of Mary are lay people from all walks of life sharing the charism and spirituality of the MoM sisters in their own contexts of life.

== Programs ==
Working alongside lay partners, composed mainly of volunteers and staff, the Sisters administer the Acay Missions Philippines Inc. (ACAY) which presently consists of three programs, namely: the School of Life Program (SOL), the Second Chance Program (SCP) and the Family Program.

=== School of Life Program ===
Restoring and Preparing young women at risk for self-sustainability. A residential home, the School of Life, recreates a family-like atmosphere for young girls aged 16 to 21 years old who experienced abuse, neglect, abandonment and other traumatic situations.

The program's main objective is to offer a therapeutic journey wherein they will rebuild themselves and build their lives as young adults ready to be reintegrated into society.

In the year 2020, The School of Life program celebrated its 20th anniversary.

=== The Second Chance Program ===
The Second Chance Program (SCP) restores and prepares young offenders for their reintegration into society. SCP is a community-based program that caters to young offenders aged 17 to 23 years old; who have committed an offense under the Philippine law. The program aims to lessen recidivism by helping young offenders successful reintegrate into society.

Besides aftercare, SCP seeks to effectively carry out initiatives that promote the welfare of children in conflict with the law (CICL), and children who are confined in various detention or rehabilitation centers. 90% of aftercare youths did not go back to detention.

=== Family Program ===
The Family Program is a support program that offers a specific journey for the parents, providing a set of training; coaching to equip them in their parental roles, and ensure successful reintegration of their child.
