= Sisters of Mary of the Presentation =

Religious institution

- Filles de Sainte-Marie de la Présentation
- Logo of the Sisters of Mary of the Presentation

- Seal of the Sisters of Mary of the Presentation
- Abbreviation: SMP
- Formation: Broons, France 1828; 198 years ago
- Founders: Fr. Joachim Fleury, Sr. Louise Lemarchand, Sr. Laurence Lemarchand
- Type: Religious institute
- Headquarters: Broons, France
- Location: France, Belgium, United States, Canada, Cameroon
- Website: soeursdebroons.catholique.fr

The Sisters of Mary of the Presentation is a Catholic religious institution founded in 1828 in Broons, France. They are of Vincentian spirituality. They use the post-nominal letters SMP.

== Foundation ==
The congregation was founded in Broons, France, in 1828 by Father Joachim Fleury, parish priest of Broons; Sr. Louise Lemarchand (religious name: Mother St. Louis); and her sister, Sr. Laurence Lemarchand.

== Status ==
In 1959, the congregation of sisters was approved by the Holy See, becoming a religious institute of pontifical right.

Sisters of Mary of the Presentation has convents in France, Belgium, the United States, Canada, and Cameroon. The sisters founded and manage health care facilities in France, the United States, and Cameroon.

== Early history ==
At the urging of Fr. Fleury, the Lemarchand sisters opened a primary school for girls in their home on October 20, 1826.

Outside of class hours, Laurence taught needlework and sewing, while Louise assisted the physicians of Broons, visiting the sick. The number of students applying for education at their school soon outstripped the capacity of their residence. At the sisters' request, Fr. Fleury secured and renovated a home for use as a school. Classes started in the new building in October 1827. In 1828, a second house nearby was secured for use as a home for destitute women and other charitable causes.

On August 25, 1828, the Lemarchand sisters took vows. Fr. Fleury composed the rule of the new community, and with just her and her sister as members, "Filles de Sainte-Marie" (The Daughters of Saint Mary; later the Sisters of Mary of the Presentation) was founded. The main ministries of the new congregation were to be education and care of the sick. On October 2, 1829, they opened an orphanage. As well as a primary education, Sr. Louise wanted to provide the orphans with a practical trade education. To this end, factory owner Mr. Bertier of Dinan taught Sr. Louise the trade of wool dyeing, which the Sisters in turn taught to the orphans.

The size of the congregation grew quickly. Sr. Louise requested from Fr. Fleury land on which to build a convent large enough to house the increasing number of sisters, as well as expand the school and the orphanage. The gifted land was a field known as “Croix Rouge” (English: The Red Cross). The motherhouse was completed on September 13, 1836. Much of the labor and cost of constructing the buildings was volunteered by the people of Broons. In 1837 they started a school which included education for deaf children. On March 30, 1839, by royal decree, the Sisters of Mary of the Presentation was legally recognized as a religious institute by the French government. At the turn of the century, the Sisters of Mary of the Presentation operated several schools and had an extensive home health ministry.

== Expansion ==
Starting in 1886, a series of anti-clerical laws in France prohibited Catholic education. The sisters' schools were closed by French authorities in Broons, Corseul, La Malhoure, Plumaudan, Morbihan, and Noyal. Some sisters then left France for countries in which they would be able to teach, forming convents in Guernsey, the Netherlands, and Belgium.

The sisters arrived in Portage-aux-Rats, Ontario in 1902. The following year they relocated to Wild Rice, North Dakota, where they opened St. Joseph Academy.

In 1903, Fr. John Power of Immaculate Conception parish in Spring Valley, Illinois invited the sisters to staff the new St. Margaret's Hospital.

On January 31, 1914, Prime Minister Raymond Poincaré signed a decree of dissolution of Sisters of Mary of the Presentation. On June 8, the sisters were expelled from their motherhouse and property confiscated. Some of the sisters expelled from the motherhouse settled in the island nation of Guernsey, others blended into local communities to secretly continue teaching and providing health care, and a few sisters were permitted to stay temporally at the motherhouse in order to care for elderly sisters.

Before the remaining sisters could be evicted, World War I (1914-1918) broke out and spread across Europe. The motherhouse was conscripted by the government for use as a military hospital, named "Complementary Hospital #42." Because the government had seized the sisters' possessions the motherhouse had no furniture, so the sisters appealed to the people of Broons and nearby, who donated furniture. Many of the sisters exiled to foreign lands returned to care for the wounded soldiers. The work of the sisters was supported by supplies from the people of Broons, the Croix-Rouge française (French Red Cross), Bien-Etre de Blesses (Wellbeing of the Wounded), the French Wounded Emergency Fund, the American Fund for the French Wounded, and their sisters in the United States.

On September 11, 120 seriously wounded soldiers left Rennes for Broons. From 1914 to 1919 the sisters in Broons treated 8,871 wounded, 803 tuberculosis patients, and 1004 traumatized soldiers. The sisters in Saint-Brieuc, France treated over 1,311 sick and wounded. The sisters in Dinan, France treated over 2,300 wounded from 1914 to 1916 (when the town was overrun by the German army). Seven sisters in Reims, Belgium treated wounded in the besieged city. In September 1914 the hospital in Reims was evacuated due to heavy bombardment, Dr. Lardennois and the sisters stayed behind to care for the wounded who could not be moved. The German army occupied the city but quickly retreated on losing the First Battle of the Marne, and resumed the bombardment of Reims; over the next few days much of the city was leveled. On October 8, Dr. Lardennois and the sisters evacuated the remaining patients to Pargny.

In 1918, after the war had ended, sixteen of the sisters serving in Broons were awarded the Medal of Honor of Epidemics by the French ministry. Many sisters died while caring for victims of the war, one of whom was posthumously awarded the Relief of Wounded Soldiers by the French Red Cross. Six sisters serving in Dinan were awarded the Gold Badge of Honor by the French Defence Health Service. Dr. Lardennois was awarded the Croix de Guerre (Military Cross) and the Legion of Honour. One of the sisters serving at Reims was posthumously awarded the Medal of French Gratitude.

During the war the ownership of the motherhouse had transferred to the French military, this enabled the sisters to resume living at the motherhouse despite still being under a decree of dissolution. On December 8, 1923, as a result of their service in the war, and with the support of Senator Léon Jenouvrier, the French government rescinded the decree of dissolution, restoring the legal standing of the Sisters of Mary of the Presentation in France. Some sisters returned after the legal standing of the motherhouse in Broons was reinstated, others made a home in their countries of exile. The motherhouse in Broons remains the international headquarters of the Sisters of Mary of the Presentation.

== Regions ==
The motherhouse is in Broons, Côtes-du-Nord, France.

- France Region - founded 1828
- Guernsey Region - founded 1903
- Belgium Region - founded 1903
- United States Region - founded 1903
- Netherlands Region - founded 1914
- Canada Region - founded 1920
- Cameroon Region - founded 1956

== Apostolate ==
The Sisters of Mary of the Presentation founded and manage health care facilities in France, the United States, and Cameroon, including sponsoring the SMP Health System. They also offer spiritual retreats at Maryvale Convent, Valley City, North Dakota. Elderly and sick sisters are involved in the ministry of prayer.

== See also ==
- Consecrated life
- Catholic religious order
- Vocational discernment in the Catholic Church
