= Félix de Jesús Rougier =

Venerable Félix of Jesus M.Sp.S
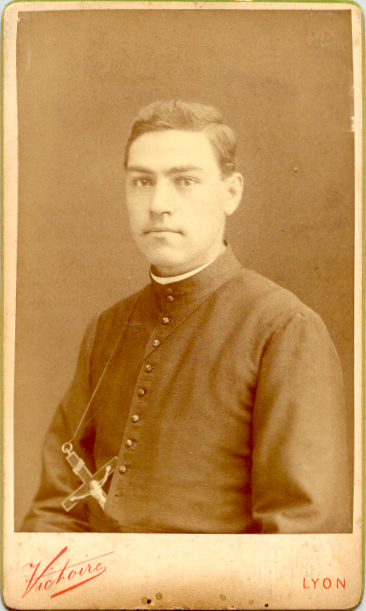
- Felix Rougier during his seminary years

Priest and Founder
- Born: Benôit-Félix Rougier; 17 December 1859; Meilhaud, Puy-de-Dôme, France
- Died: 10 January 1938 (aged 78); Mexico City, Mexico
- Venerated in: Roman Catholic Church
- Feast: 10 January

Felix of Jesus Rougier, M.Sp.S. (December 17, 1859, Meilhaud, France — January 10, 1938, Mexico City) was a Catholic priest and founder of several institutes of consecrated life who was declared venerable in 2000.

== Youth ==
Felix Rougier was born on December 17, 1859, in Meilhaud, France. His parents were Benôit and Maria Louisa (née Olanier) Rougier. He had two brothers: Emmanuel, who was initially a missionary in Oceania but later quit the mission, and Stanislas, who distinguished himself as an untiring promoter of social action, coming to the defense of local farmers of their hometown.

Initially, Rougier was thinking of becoming a doctor. However, his vision soon radically changed after meeting the bishop, Eloy, who spoke at length about the missions to over 300 students, including young Rougier. Because of this, Rougier felt a very intense desire to become a missionary, which never left him.

His motto became "Love the Holy Spirit and make Him loved ..."

== Ordination ==
After reflecting on his vocation as a missionary, Rougier decided to enter the Society of Mary (Marists), where he was admitted and recognized for his obedience and happy surrender to his ministry. When the day of his ordination grew near, he developed severe arthritis in his right arm. This was cause to prevent his ordination since at that time good health was a fundamental requirement for the priesthood. However, after painful testing of his condition, he was miraculously cured by John Bosco, who would later say, "God will make you win many souls." Bosco was known for his ability to work extraordinary wonders in people and he did this in Rougier. Although the problem with his arm was not entirely removed, the improvement was extraordinary and the strength in his arm increased over time, ultimately saving his right arm. Finally, he was ordained as a priest on September 24, 1887.

== Missionary work ==
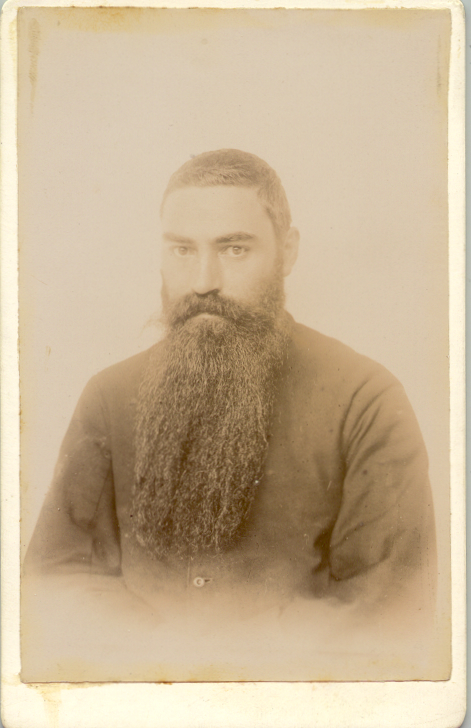
During his years in Colombia

Rougier's dream was to be a missionary in Oceania, but initially his journey there was suspended due to the illness in the arm. His superiors sent him to Colombia where he developed an extensive educational effort and faced the challenges of the Thousand Days' War. He conducted a national ministry collecting food and delivering it to the hungry. Also, he devoted himself to accompanying the soldiers in their last hours and times of illness. He risked his life during the war to hear confessions and attend to the wounded, once even defending the cloak on a corpse that would have been desecrated by the man’s enemies.

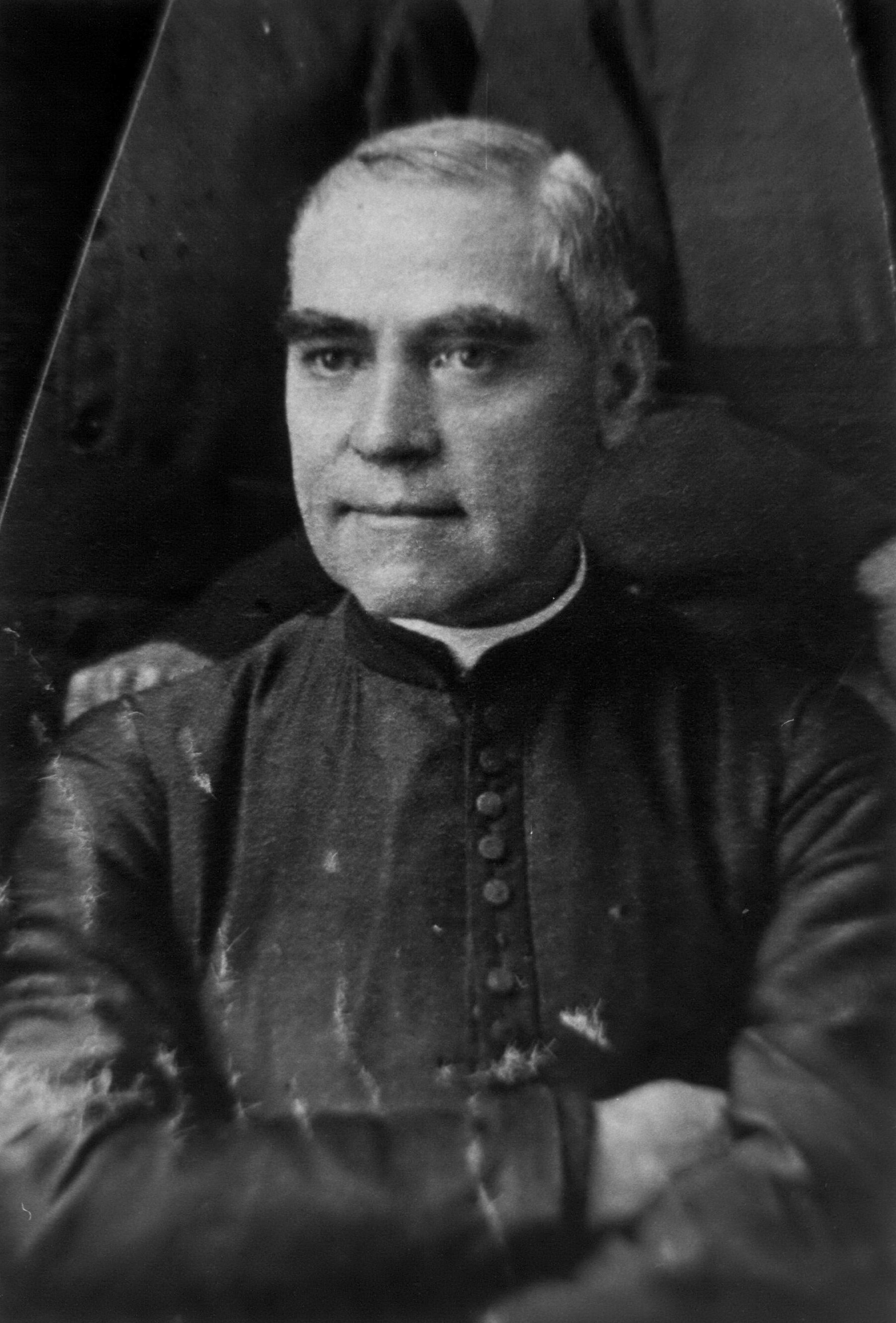
Felix Rougier during his years in Spain

In February 1902, Rougier went to Mexico where, on February 4, 1903, he met Concepción Cabrera de Armida. She, without knowing anything about him, began to talk to him in confession about certain things that only Rougier himself could have known. Armida, called "Conchita," had various mystical graces. She then spoke to him about the Works of the Cross which she had founded, causing Rougier to immediately have a great love and respect for her. Soon, Conchita announced that God wanted him to be the founder of the Fifth Work of the Cross, the Missionaries of the Holy Spirit. After asking advice from his superiors, he accepted her invitation.

== Foundations ==
When Rougier first requested permission to found the Congregation mentioned, he was denied and forbidden to deal with the project for ten years. This caused him great pain, but he stood firm with Christ knowing that the work would pay off. Finally through the intercession of the bishop Ramón Ibarra y González, first the Archbishop of Puebla then the Vatican granted Rougier his foundation on December 25, 1914, in the Chapel of the Roses at Tepeyac, Mexico City. This was the origin of the Congregation of the Missionaries the Holy Spirit. This was done despite full religious persecution by the government. As time went on, Rougier founded three new Institutes of Religious Life: The Daughters of the Holy Spirit (1924) in order to work for the education of young people and to promote all vocations within the church, the Guadalupan Missionaries of the Holy Spirit (1930) in response to the needs of indigenous people and the needy, and the Oblates of Jesus the Priest (1937) in order to assist in the formation of future priests.

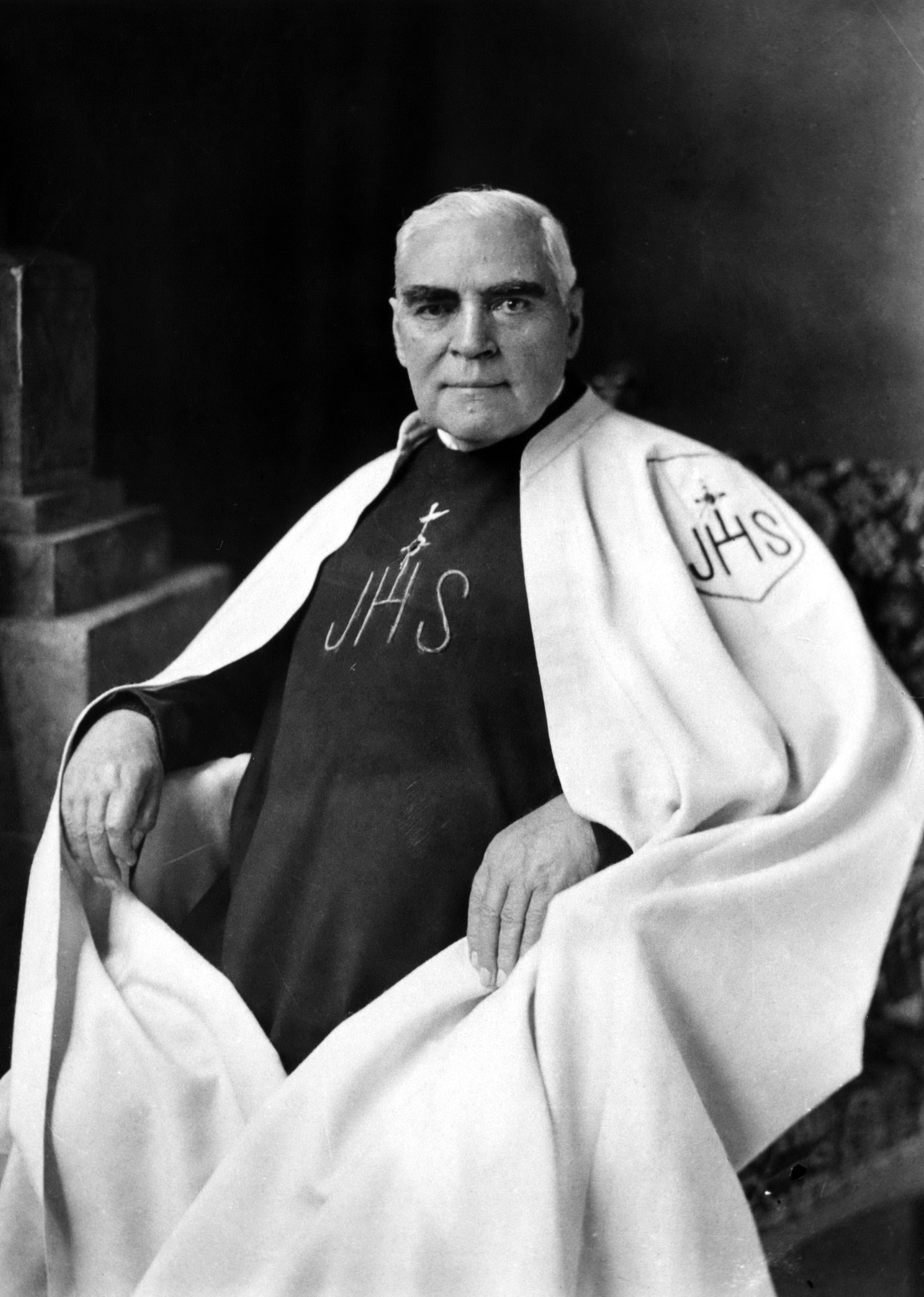
Felix of Jesus Rougier after the foundation of the Missionaries of the Holy Spirit

Rougier of Jesus was already known in his time as a saint because he loved his priesthood, his mission, and he never lost an opportunity to work for a better world. He was ahead of his time by giving strong support to the laity as well as promoting various media. He founded the Revista la Cruz which continues to be edited. Besides being a great Egyptologist, he dedicated himself to the creation and promotion of schools and hospitals.

== Death and venerability declaration ==
Rougier died on January 10, 1938, in the French Hospital in Mexico City. His last words were: "With Mary everything, without her, nothing." His remains are in the National Church of San Felipe de Jesús, in the Historic Center of Mexico City.

He was declared Venerable by Pope John Paul II in 2000. His cause for beatification has been initiated.
