= Sisters Minor of Mary Immaculate =

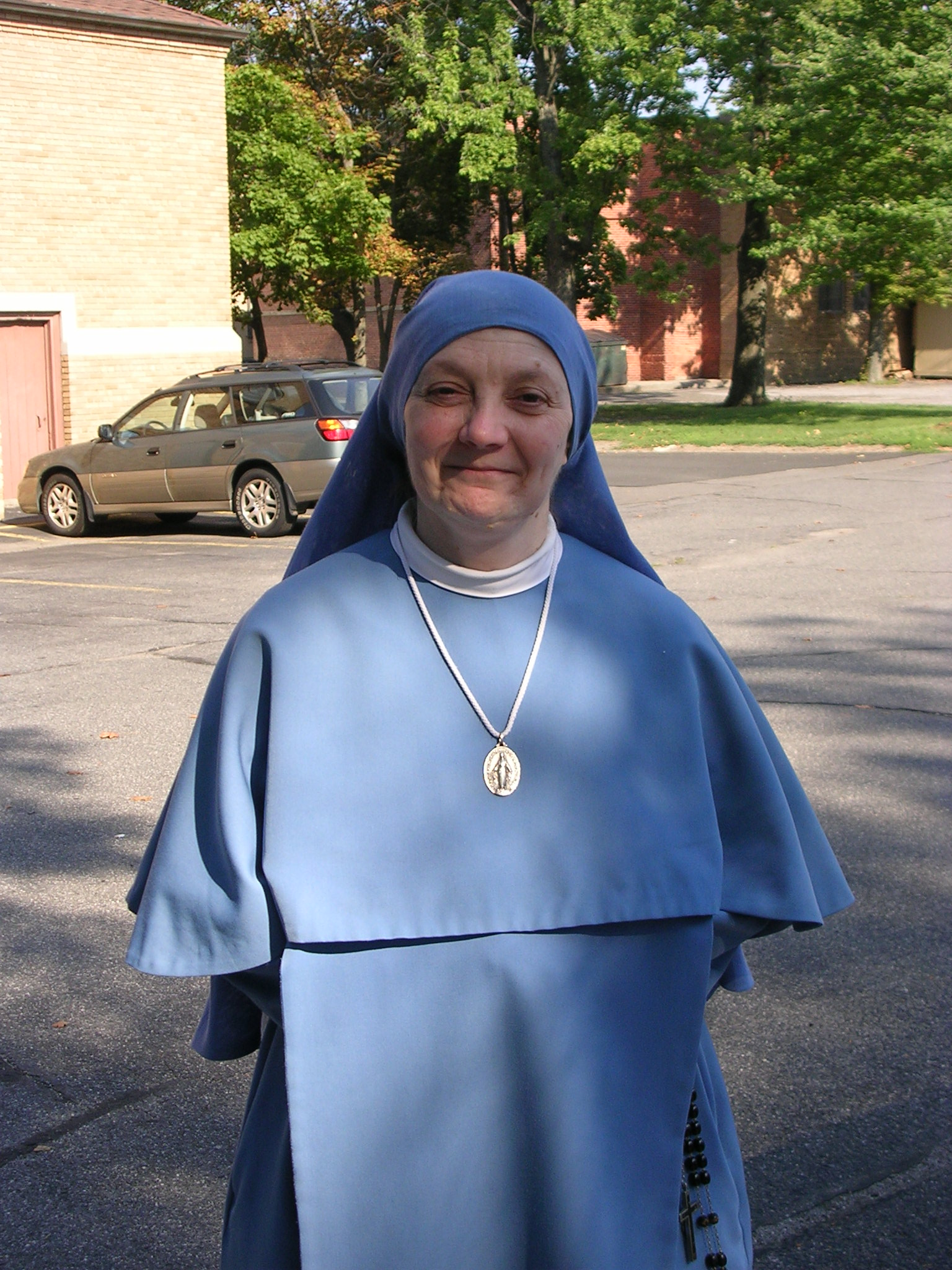
Sister Katherine of the Sisters Minor of Mary Immaculate

The Sisters Minor of Mary Immaculate was a Roman Catholic religious congregation of consecrated women. It was founded by Mother Maria Elisabetta Patrizi in Rome, Italy, with the assistance of Father Elia M. Bruson, OFM Conv., on August 14, 1983, and canonically erected in that diocese in 1993.

== Description ==
The congregation followed the example of St. Maximilian Kolbe, with ties to St. Therese of Lisieux. The order had a unique fourth vow, which is their pledge to be at God's disposal, like Mary, without reserve, for the "greatest glory of God through the salvation of all in Jesus Christ". The Sisters Minor of Mary Immaculate were located in Italy, Poland, Turkey, and the United States of America.
