= Congregation of diocesan right =

Type of Roman Catholic congregation

A Congregation of diocesan right (or Institute of diocesan right) is a type of religious congregation codified by the laws of the Catholic church, wherein the congregation is under the authority of a particular local bishop, rather than that of the pope. A congregation responsible directly to the pope is a congregation of pontifical right. Most of the major religious orders are congregations of pontifical right.

The major types of religious associations recognized by canon law are:

1. Public Association of the Faithful

2. Institutes of Consecrated Life

- a. Institute of diocesan right
- b. Institute of pontifical right
