= Missionaries of the Holy Spirit =

Catholic religious order

The Missionaries of the Holy Spirit (MSpS) are a Catholic religious institute founded in Mexico City in 1914 by French missionary Félix de Jesús Rougier. Father Rougier was a priest and a member of another religious order, the Society of Mary. He would receive dispensation of his vows and permission to join the new congregation 12 years later.

The institute is divided into three provinces: Province of Mexico, Félix de Jesús Province, and Christ the Priest Province. The community has 376 members in seven countries: Mexico, United States, Italy, Costa Rica, Spain, Chile and Colombia. Its members are distributed among 57 communities, 40 of which are in Mexico. Currently, there are five bishops, 256 priests, one permanent deacon and 15 professed religious brothers in the congregation. Additionally, there are 99 members in various stages of formation toward the priesthood. Three of the most prominent members are the Archbishop of the Roman Catholic Archdiocese of San Antonio, Texas, Gustavo Garcia-Siller, M.Sp.S.; Eusebio L. Elizondo Almaguer, M.Sp.S., Auxiliary Bishop of the Roman Catholic Archdiocese of Seattle, Washington; Bishop Emeritus of the Roman Catholic Diocese of Nuevo Laredo, Mexico, Ricardo Watty Urquidi, M.Sp.S., who was one of Archbishop Gustavo Garcia-Siller's principal co-consecrators when the Archbishop was ordained to the episcopacy in 2003 as an Auxiliary Bishop of the Roman Catholic Archdiocese of Chicago, under Cardinal Francis Eugene George, O.M.I.
