= Hayden House =

Hayden House may refer to:

in the United States

(by state then town)

- C.T. Hayden House, Tempe, Arizona, listed on the National Register of Historic Places (NRHP) in Maricopa County
- Terry-Hayden House, Bristol, Connecticut, listed on the NRHP in Hartford County
- Gilman-Hayden House, East Hartford, Connecticut, listed on the NRHP in Hartford County
- Capt. Nathaniel Hayden House, Windsor, Connecticut, listed on the NRHP in Hartford County
- Hayden Depot, Hayden, Colorado, listed on the NRHP in Routt County
- Hayden Rooming House, Hayden, Colorado, listed on the NRHP in Routt County
- Hayden Ranch Headquarters, Leadville, Colorado, listed on the NRHP in Lake County
- Isaac R. Hayden House, Lewisport, Kentucky, listed on the NRHP in Hancock County
- Hayden Building, Boston, Massachusetts, listed on the NRHP in Suffolk County
- Lewis and Harriet Hayden House, a historic Abolitionist-associated house in Beacon Hill, Boston
- William Hayden House (Tecumseh, Michigan), listed on the NRHP in Lenawee County
- A. W. Hayden House, Albuquerque, New Mexico, listed on the NRHP in Bernalillo County
- Hayden House (Ossining, New York), a children's home that is a Roman Catholic Archdiocese of New York charity
- Potton-Hayden House, Big Spring, Texas, listed on the NRHP in Howard County
- William Hayden House (Albany, Vermont), listed on the NRHP in Orleans County

== See also ==
- William Hayden House (disambiguation)
