= Secular Franciscan Order =

Part of the third branch of the Franciscan Family

- Ordo Franciscanus Saecularis
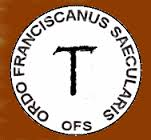
- Abbreviation: O.F.S., Secular Franciscan
- Formation: 1221
- Founder: Francis of Assisi
- Type: Public Association of the Faithful
- Headquarters: Rome, Italy
- Minister General: Tibor Kauser
- Main organ: International Council
- Website: www.ciofs.info

The Secular Franciscan Order (Latin: Ordo Franciscanus Saecularis; abbreviated O.F.S.) is a Public Association of the Faithful within the Catholic Church, which forms part of the third branch of the Franciscan movement. It is composed of men and women who seek to observe the Gospel of Jesus by following the example of Francis of Assisi in daily (secular) life. Unlike the other Third Orders, Secular Franciscans are not under the supervision of the clergy of the same spiritual movement. Brothers and sisters of the Secular Franciscan Order make a spiritual commitment (promises) to their own Rule of Life; local fraternities, however, cannot exist without the assistance of the consecrated religious of the three Franciscan Orders. The Secular Franciscan Order was the third of the three ways of life established by Francis of Assisi in the early 13th century.

Originally known as the Brothers and Sisters of Penance, the Order is open to any Catholic, in good standing, at least 18 years in age, not bound by a formal commitment to another spiritual tradition (e.g., Carmelite) and is made up of both the laity (male and female non-clergy) and secular clergy (deacons, priests, bishops and even popes).

Although Secular Franciscans make a public profession and are consecrated, they are not bound by public vows as are religious living in community. The Third Order Regular, which grew out of the Third Order Secular, do make religious vows and live in community.

Because the Order belongs to the spiritual family of the Franciscans, the Holy See has entrusted its pastoral care and spiritual assistance to the Franciscan First Order (Order of Friars Minor, Order of Friars Minor Capuchin, and Order of Friars Minor Conventual) and Third Order Regular, which belong to the same spiritual family.

== History ==
=== Foundation of the Secular Third Order ===
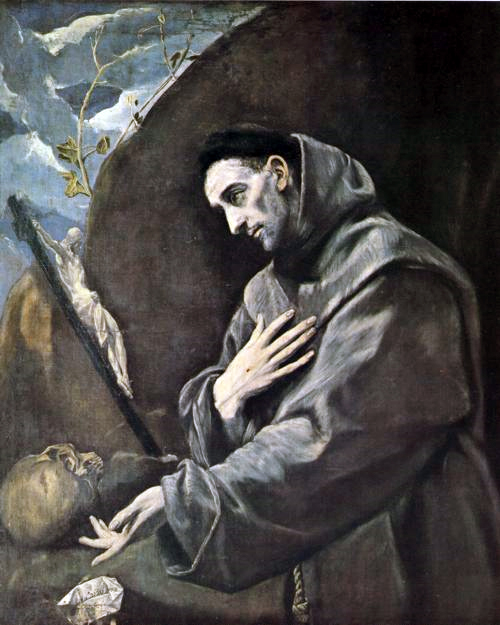
The Secular Franciscan Order and other Franciscan movements are disciples of Francis of Assisi (1182–1226). Painting by El Greco (1541–1614).

The preaching of St. Francis, as well as his example, attracted numerous married men and women who wished to join the First and Second Franciscan Orders. Because being married was incompatible with the order, Francis established a rule inbued with the Franciscan spirit to accommodate them, founding what became known as the Third Order. In the composition of this rule St. Francis was assisted by his friend Cardinal Ugolino di Conti (later Pope Gregory IX).

Where the Third Order was first introduced is unknown. The preponderance of opinion is Florence, chiefly on the authority of Mariano of Florence, or Faenza, who cites the first papal bull known on the subject (Regesta pontificum). The less authoritative Fioretti assigns Cannara, a small town two hours' walk from the Portiuncula, as the birthplace of the Third Order. Mariano, Thomas of Celano, and the Bull for Faenza (16 December 1221) suggest that 1221 was the earliest date for founding of the Third Order.

Another story tells of Luchesius Modestini, a greedy merchant from Poggibonzi, who had his life changed by meeting Francis about 1213. He and his wife Buonadonna were moved to dedicate their lives to prayer and serving the poor. While many couples of that era who experienced a religious conversion chose to separate and enter monasteries, this couple felt called to live out this new way of life together. Francis was moved to write a Rule for them which would allow them to do so. Thus began the Brothers and Sisters of Penance in the Franciscan movement, which came to be called the Franciscan Third Order. The Chiesa della Buona Morte in the city of Cannara (Church of the Good Death, previously named "Church of the Stigmata of S. Francesco") claims to be the birthplace of the Third Order. Another contender from the same city is the Church of S. Francesco.

This way of life was quickly embraced by many couples and single men and women who did not feel called to the stark poverty of the friars and nuns, especially widows. They zealously practiced the lessons Francis taught concerning prayer, humility, peacemaking, self-denial, fidelity to the duties of their state, and above all charity. Like Francis, they cared for lepers and outcasts. Even canonical hermits were able to follow this Rule and bring themselves into the orbit of the Franciscan vision. The Order came to be a force in the medieval legal system, since one of its tenets forbade the use of arms, and thus the male members of the order could not be drafted into the constant and frequent battles between cities and regions in that era.

=== Third Order of St. Francis in Canada ===
The Third Order of St. Francis was established by the Friars Minor Recollects at Quebec in 1671 and later at Trois-Rivières and Montreal. In 1681 a Recollect notes that "many pious people of Quebec belong to the Third Order". After the cession of Canada to Britain in 1763 following the French defeat in the Seven Years' War, the Third Order, deprived of its directors, gradually disappeared but was revived In the 1840s.

The 1840 revival was led by Ignace Bourget, Bishop of Montreal. Noted naturalist Léon Abel Provancher was particularly active. In 1866, having received faculties from the General of the Friars Minor, Provancher established a fraternity in his parish at Portneuf Quebec, and promoted the Third Order in his writings. For two years he edited a monthly review he published on the Third Order.

On a pilgrimage to Jerusalem, Provancher met Frédéric Janssoone and the two became friends. In 1881 Janssoone went to Canada, where he gave new spirit to the Third Order, inaugurating and visiting fraternities. On one occasion, he preached a four-hour sermon on the Stations of the Cross in the church of Sainte-Marie-Madeleine in Cap-de-la-Madeleine, to a women's Third Order group from Montreal. Several bishops, among them Bishop Louis-François Richer Laflèche of Trois-Rivières and Archbishop Taschereau, welcomed him as its promoter.

The foundation of a community of Friars Minor at Montreal in 1890 inaugurated a new era of growth for the Third Order. As of 2016 there were over 5,000 active members in approximately 200 fraternities.

=== Third Order of St. Francis in Great Britain ===
Little is known of the Third Order in Great Britain prior to the Reformation. In 1385 there were 8 fraternities in the British Isles, compared with twenty-nine in France. William Staney, the first commissary of the order in England after the Dissolution of the Monasteries, wrote "A Treatise of the Third Order of St. Francis", published at Douai in 1617. Alice Ingham became a member of the lay society of the third order of St Francis in 1872. She later went on to found the Sisters of St. Joseph's Society for Foreign Missions. In 1877 the English Franciscans initiated publication of The Franciscan Annual and monthly bulletin of the Third Order. A national conference of British tertiaries, with a view to strengthening and consolidating the order, was held in 1898 at Liverpool. A second national conference was held at Leeds.

As in other regions, the members of the Order are now self-governing, under the auspices of a National Fraternity. In Britain, the National Fraternity is made up of nine regional fraternities. In Scotland there are fraternities in Edinburgh, Glasgow, and Inverness.

=== Third Order of St. Francis in Ireland ===
The Third Order was active in Dublin during the medieval period. There were tertiaries assisting the Conventual Franciscans at Drogheda in 1855. Although the friary closed in 2000, the Secular Franciscans continue to meet in Drogheda. A renewal of the Third Order in Dublin began around 1860. A fraternity was established by the Capuchins in Cork in 1866 and another in Kilkenny. Matt Talbot joined the Third Order in Merchants Quay in 1890. Merchants Quay was later turned into a Third Order Centre with rooms where tertiaries could meet and relax.

In the late nineteenth century the Irish Franciscans produced the Irish Franciscan Tertiary, a monthly journal for the Third Order Franciscans. Six hundred tertiaries met in Dublin in 1971 to celebrate the seven hundred and fiftieth anniversary of the founding of the order. As of 2014, Secular Franciscans in Ireland numbered over 1200.

=== Third Order of St. Francis in the United States ===
Early Franciscan missionaries established fraternities in the Southern and Southwestern states, where there was extensive French and Spanish Catholic influence. A fraternity was established at Santa Fe before 1680. Another fraternity operated in Santa Fe, New Mexico almost from the time of the Reconquest (1692–1695), as reported by the Father Guardian (custos), José Bernal, dated 17 September 1794. Single individuals among Native Americans were sometimes classified as tertiaries. It is likely that a confraternity was founded at St. Augustine, Florida, before the close of the 16th century, as this was the first Spanish settlement in what is now the United States. A confraternity was established at San Antonio, Texas, before the middle of the 18th century. The establishment of provinces of the order of Friars Minor brought about the establishment of many confraternities. In 1919 a number of friar provincials set up a national organization.

With the approval of a new Rule in 1978, the fraternities were reorganized as an independent arm of the Franciscan Movement. The National Fraternity of the United States was formed and divided into thirty regions. As of 2016, there are over 12,000 Secular Franciscans in the United States.

=== Third Order of St. Francis in Oceania ===
The Secular Franciscans Oceania is the National Fraternity for Australia, Papua New Guinea, Sabah, Singapore, and New Zealand. The Republic of Korea has its own National Fraternity.

== The Rule ==
The earliest Rule was found in the Guarnacci Library in Volterra. This primitive document is known as the Earlier Exhortation, or the Earlier Version, of "The Letter to All the Faithful" and was likely composed before 1215. An expanded version, the Later Exhortation, was completed by about 1220. Both Exhortations were composed by Francis. Both documents call the lay faithful to a life of penance, i.e., of turning away from sin and toward God. In the Earlier Exhortation, Francis describes the elements of the conversion process:

1) love God 2) love one's neighbor 3) turn away from our sinful tendencies 4) "receive the Body and Blood of our Lord Jesus Christ" and, as a result of the above, 5) producing worthy fruits of penance – a renewed life characterized by charity, forgiveness and compassion toward others.

Francis speaks in ecstatic terms of those who embrace this way of life: "Oh, how happy and blessed are these men and women when they do these things and persevere in doing them since the Spirit of the Lord will rest upon them and He will make His home and dwelling among them. They are children of the heavenly Father whose works they do, and they are spouses, brothers and mothers of Our Lord Jesus Christ."

The "primitive rule" was approved by Pope Honorius III in 1221 with the Memoriale Propositi, and revised in 1289 by the Franciscan Pope Nicholas IV with the Supra montem, and by Pope Leo XIII approving in 1883 Misericors Dei Filius. The current rule was given by Pope Paul VI in 1978 with the Apostolic letter Seraphicus Patriarcha and is designed to adapt the Secular Franciscan Order to the changing needs and expectations of the Church.

The spirit of the Rule is found in Article 4:

The rule and life of the Secular Franciscan is this: To observe the Gospel of our Lord Jesus Christ by following the example of St. Francis of Assisi, who made Christ the inspiration and the center of his life with God and people. Christ, the gift of the Father’s love, is the way to him, the Truth into which the Holy Spirit leads us, and the life which he has come to give abundantly. Secular Franciscans should devote themselves especially to careful reading of the Gospel, going from Gospel to life and life to the Gospel.

== Structure ==
The Secular Franciscan Order is a public association of the faithful in the Catholic Church. It is divided into fraternities at various levels: local, regional, national, and international. The OFS is governed by the universal law of the Church and by its own Rule, Constitutions, Ritual, and statutes. The interpretation of the Rule and of the Constitutions is done by the Holy See. The practical interpretation of the Constitutions, with the purpose of harmonizing its application in different areas and at the various levels of the Order, belongs to the General Chapter of the OFS. The clarification of specific points which require a timely decision belongs to the Presidency of the International Council of the OFS. The International Council of the OFS statutes are approved by the General Chapter of the OFS and confirmed by the Union of the Franciscan Ministers General.

National fraternities have their own statutes approved by the Presidency of the International Council of the OFS. The regional and the local fraternities may have their own statutes approved by the council of the higher level. The fraternities at different levels are animated and guided by the minister or president, with the council, in accordance with the Rule, the Constitutions, and their own Statutes. These offices are conferred through elections. NAFRA reports that in the United States there are currently 30 regions, 700 fraternities, and 14,500 professed members. In 2002, the CIOFS reported a worldwide membership of 400,000 professed members.

The International Fraternity is constituted by the organic union of all the Catholic Secular Franciscan fraternities in the world. It is identical to the OFS with its own juridical personality within the Church, organized and in conformity with the Constitutions and its own Statutes. The International Fraternity is guided and animated by the Minister or President with the International Council (CIOFS), which has its seat in Rome, Italy.

== General Ministers after the last Rule ==
- 1984–1990 Manuela Mattioli OFS
- 1990–1996 Emanuella D'Nunzio OFS
- 1996–2002 Emanuella D'Nunzio OFS
- 2002–2008 Encarnacion del Pozo OFS
- 2008–2014 Encarnacion del Pozo OFS
- 2014–2020 Tibor Kauser OFS
- 2020–2026 Tibor Kauser OFS

== Spirituality ==
=== Franciscan spirituality ===
Francis's spirituality was simply to "observe the Gospel."

Pope Pius XII stated in 1956:

There is, then, a Franciscan doctrine in accordance with which God is holy, is great, and above all, is good, indeed the supreme Good. For in this doctrine, God is love. He lives by love, creates for love, becomes flesh and redeems, that is, he saves and makes holy, for love. There is also a Franciscan way of contemplating Jesus: the meeting of uncreated Love with created love. Similarly, there is a method of loving Him and of imitating Him: in reality it sees the Man-God, and prefers to consider Him in His holy Humanity, because this reveals Him more clearly and, as it were, allows Him to be touched. From this arises a burning devotion to the Incarnation and the Passion of Jesus, because these (mysteries) allow us to see Him, not so much in His glory, in His omnipotent grandeur, or in His eternal triumph, as rather in His human love – so tender in the manger, so sorrowful on the cross.

As a summary of the elements of Franciscan spirituality, a Franciscan should live:

- in communion with Christ poor and crucified,
- in the love of God,
- in brother/sisterhood with all people and all of creation,
- participating in the life and mission of the Church,
- in continual conversion,
- in a life of prayer – liturgical, personal, communal,
- as instruments of peace.

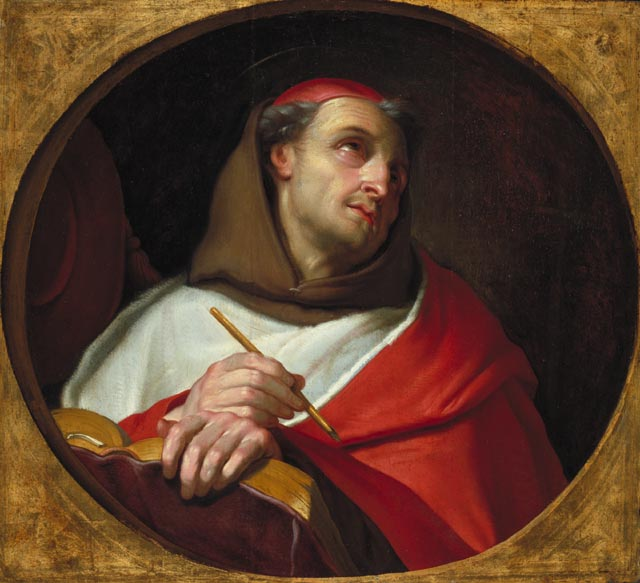
Bonaventure (1221–1274), painting by Claude François, ca. 1650–1660.

=== St. Bonaventure ===
Bonaventure, the seraphic doctor, is regarded as deeply penetrated and imbued with the mind of Francis of Assisi. Étienne Gilson has said that in reading Saint Bonaventure, one receives the impression that it is as if Saint Francis has been raised up and is philosophizing.

Bonaventure sought to know God in Him in order to love and serve Him. Besides his popular writing, Bonaventure has written works of pure spirituality in strict dependence and vital application on Christ, because he felt that all knowledge that is not founded on Christ is vain. The work which sums up all his doctrine is the "Collationes in Hexaemeron", a synthesis of all human knowledge, including spirituality.

=== John Duns Scotus ===
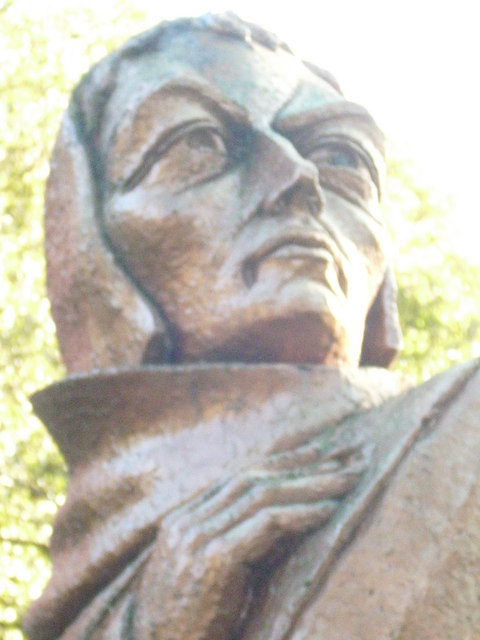
John Duns Scotus (c1266–1308)

The second of the Franciscan masters produced no notable treatise on spirituality, but John Duns Scotus has systematized the primacy on which Franciscan spirituality is founded. He has given many suggestions and produced many texts such that his disciples and his commentators can be guided by him, and thus came to reveal Franciscan thought and its spirituality, though he differs notably from Bonaventure.

In early education, in training, and in his days at Oxford as student and later as master, John Duns Scotus deepened the understanding of the real and the concrete. He entered the School to profit from the works of Alexander of Hales, Albert the Great, Bonaventure, Thomas Aquinas, and Roger Bacon. Thus John Duns Scotus joined his predecessor Bonaventure on a similar interpretation of the function and mission of Jesus Christ given by Francis, that Christ is the highest grace God offers His creatures, and their response controls their attitude to God.

=== Being secular ===
One of the most important consequences of the Secular Franciscan charism is that the spiritual formation of the OFS must cater for those whose vocation is, motivated by the Gospel, to live in secular circumstances. Intimate union with Christ lies at the heart of the OFS vocation. Secular Franciscans should seek to encounter the living and active person of Christ in their brothers and sisters, in Sacred Scripture, in the Church and in liturgical activity. They do this by studying, loving and living in an integrated human and evangelical life.

Twenty-first century Secular Franciscans live out the secular aspect of their charism by paying attention to three things. First, they draw on the rich experience of Franciscan figures of the past, who were both contemplative and dedicated to activities as parents, single people, kings, craftsmen, recluses, and people involved in welfare activities. Second, at the beginning of the third millennium, they face a test of their creativity when confronted by the new evangelisation. Third, they cultivate a deep knowledge of Francis the prophet, an example from the past, leading them into the future.

=== Fraternity ===
The Secular Franciscan charism is not given to an individual person but to a group of brothers and sisters. Thus from the outset, it is a group that is shaped by the Holy Church, and it is only in this context that the charism can thrive.

The fraternity of the Order finds its origin in the inspiration of Francis to whom the Most High revealed the essential Gospel quality of life in fraternal communion. The vocation of the Order is, therefore, a vocation to live the Gospel in fraternal communion. For one's initial formation, participation in the meetings of the local fraternity is an indispensable presupposition for initiation into community of prayer and into fraternal life.

== Missionary activity ==
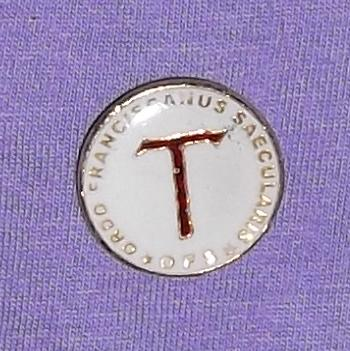
Secular Franciscans can be recognized by the Tau Cross they wear as a lapel pin (here) or pendant.

The Secular Franciscans commit themselves to live the Gospel according to Franciscan spirituality in their secular condition. The Secular Franciscan must personally and assiduously study the Gospel and Sacred Scripture to foster love for the word of the Gospel and help the brothers and sisters to know and understand it as it is proclaimed by the Church with the assistance of the Spirit. Secular Franciscans, called in earlier times "the brothers and sisters of penance", propose to live in the spirit of continual conversion. Some means to cultivate this characteristic of the Franciscan vocation, individually and in fraternity, are: listening to and celebrating the Word of God; review of life; spiritual retreats; the help of a spiritual adviser; and penitential celebrations. Secular Franciscans should pledge themselves to live the spirit of the Beatitudes and, in a special way, the spirit of poverty. Evangelical poverty demonstrates confidence in the Father, affects interior freedom, and disposes them to promote a more just distribution of wealth. They must provide for their own families and serve society by means of their work and material goods. They have a particular manner of living evangelical poverty. To understand and achieve it requires a strong personal commitment and the stimulation of the fraternity in prayer and dialogue, communal review of life, and attentiveness to the instructions of the Church and the demands of society. They pledge themselves to reduce their own personal needs so as to be better able to share spiritual and material goods with their brothers and sisters, especially those most in need. They should give thanks to God for the goods they have received, using them as good stewards and not as owners. They should take a firm position against consumerism and against ideologies and practices which prefer riches over human and religious values and which permit the exploitation of the human person. They should love and practice purity of heart, the source of true fraternity.

=== Environmental justice ===
Following the example of Francis of Assisi, patron saint of ecology, they collaborate with efforts to fight pollution and to conserve all that is valuable in nature. This conservation keeps in mind that the exploitation of the environment often puts disproportionate hardships on the poor, especially if they live in the affected areas.

=== Social justice ===
Secular Franciscans are called to make their own contribution, inspired by the person and message of Francis, towards a civilization in which the dignity of the human person, shared responsibility, and love may be living realities. They should firmly commit themselves to oppose every form of exploitation, discrimination, and exclusion and against every attitude of indifference in relation to others. They promote the building of fraternity among peoples: they should be committed to create worthy conditions of life for all and to work for the freedom of all people. Secular Franciscans attempt to be in the forefront in the field of public life. They should collaborate as much as possible for the passage of just laws and ordinances.

=== Work and leisure ===
For Francis, work is a gift and to work is a grace. Daily work is not only the means of livelihood, but the opportunity to serve God and neighbor as well as a way to develop one's own personality. In the conviction that work is a right and a duty and that every form of occupation deserves respect, the brothers and sisters should commit themselves to collaborate so that all persons may have the possibility to work and so that working conditions may always be more humane. Leisure and recreation have their own value and are necessary for personal development. Secular Franciscans should maintain a balance between work and rest and should strive to make meaningful use of their leisure time.

=== Peace ===
Secular Franciscans are called to be bearers of peace in their families and in society The renunciation of the use of violence, characteristic of the followers of Francis, does not mean the renunciation of action. Peace is the work of justice and the fruit of reconciliation and of fraternal love. While acknowledging both the personal and national right to self-defense, they should respect the choice of those who, because of conscientious objection, refuse to bear arms. However, the brothers and sisters should take care that their interventions are always inspired by Christian love.

=== Family ===
Secular Franciscans should consider their own family to be the first place in which to live out the ideals of their Christian commitment and Franciscan vocation. They should make space within family time for prayer, for the Word of God, and for Christian catechesis. They should concern themselves with respect for all life in every situation, from conception until death. Married couples find in the Rule of the OFS an effective aid in their own journey of Christian life, aware that in the sacrament of matrimony their love shares in the love that Christ has for the Church. The beauty and the strength of the human love of the spouses is a profound witness for their own family, the Church, and the world.

=== Youth ===
Out of the conviction of the need to educate children to take an interest in community, "bringing them the awareness of being living, active members of the People of God" and because of the fascination which Francis of Assisi can exercise on them, the formation of groups of children should be encouraged. With the help of a pedagogy and an organization suitable to their age, these children should be initiated into a knowledge and love of the Franciscan life. National statutes will give an appropriate orientation for the organization of these groups and their relationship to the fraternity and to the groups of Franciscan youth. The Franciscan Youth is formed by those young people who feel called by the Holy Spirit to share the experience of the Christian life in fraternity, in the light of the message of Francis, deepening their own vocation within the context of the Secular Franciscan Order.

=== Entrance into the Order, and formation ===
Conditions for admission are: to profess the Catholic faith, to live in communion with the Church, to be of good moral standing, and to show clear signs of a vocation. Membership in the Order is attained through a time of initiation, a time of formation, and the Profession of the Rule. The journey of formation, which is expected to develop throughout life, begins with entrance into the fraternity. Those responsible for formation are: the candidate, the entire fraternity, the minister with the council, the master of formation, and the assistant as spiritual guide. Profession is the solemn ecclesial act by which the candidate renews the baptismal promises and in a public profession consecrates their lives to the service of God's kingdom and to live the Gospel in the world according to the example of Francis and following the Rule of the OFS.

== Contemporary Secular Franciscans ==
Membership of the Secular Franciscan Order includes lay men and women as well as diocesan priests. A number of Popes have been members of this Order. Professed members use the letters OFS after their name in line with the official name of the Order.

The current rule was given by Pope Paul VI in 1978 with the Apostolic letter Seraphicus Patriarcha. It is designed to adapt the Secular Franciscan Order to the needs and expectations of the Church in the conditions of changing times.

Under this new Rule, the tertiaries of the Franciscan movement were set up as an autonomous Order, with their own Minister General as head of the Order. They were removed from the jurisdiction of the friars of the First Order and of the Third Order Regular. In 1990 a new set of Constitutions were written and approved by the General Chapter of the Order held in Madrid, Spain, to clarify issues related to the revised Rule. In 2000, the appropriate agencies of the Catholic Church, in the name of Pope John Paul II, gave the official approval to the final form of the Constitutions, with an effective date of 8 February 2001. The Order is now known as the Secular Franciscan Order (abbreviated as OFS). The Secular Franciscan Order is a fully recognized order within the Catholic Church and part of the Franciscan family. The present active membership of the Order worldwide is about 350,000 across more than 100 countries.

A summary of the elements of Franciscan spirituality, includes living in communion with Christ poor and crucified, in the love of God, and in brother/sisterhood with all people and all of creation.

== Famous Secular Franciscans ==
The following people belonging to the Order have been proclaimed saints:

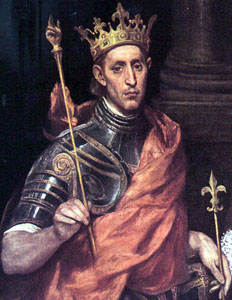
Louis IX of France (1214–1270) was declared Patron of the Order.

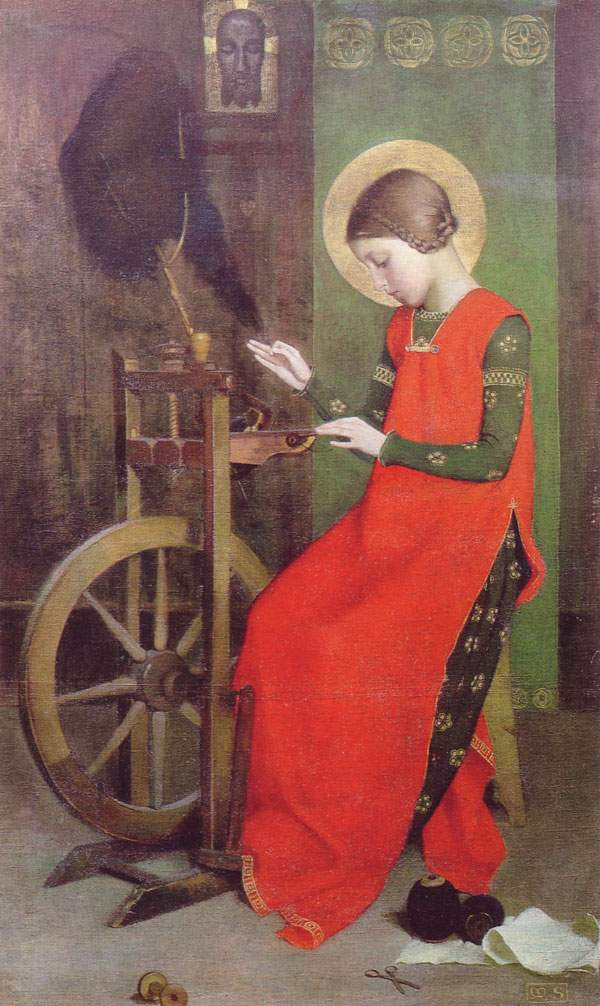
Elizabeth of Hungary (1207–1231) is the Patroness of the Order.

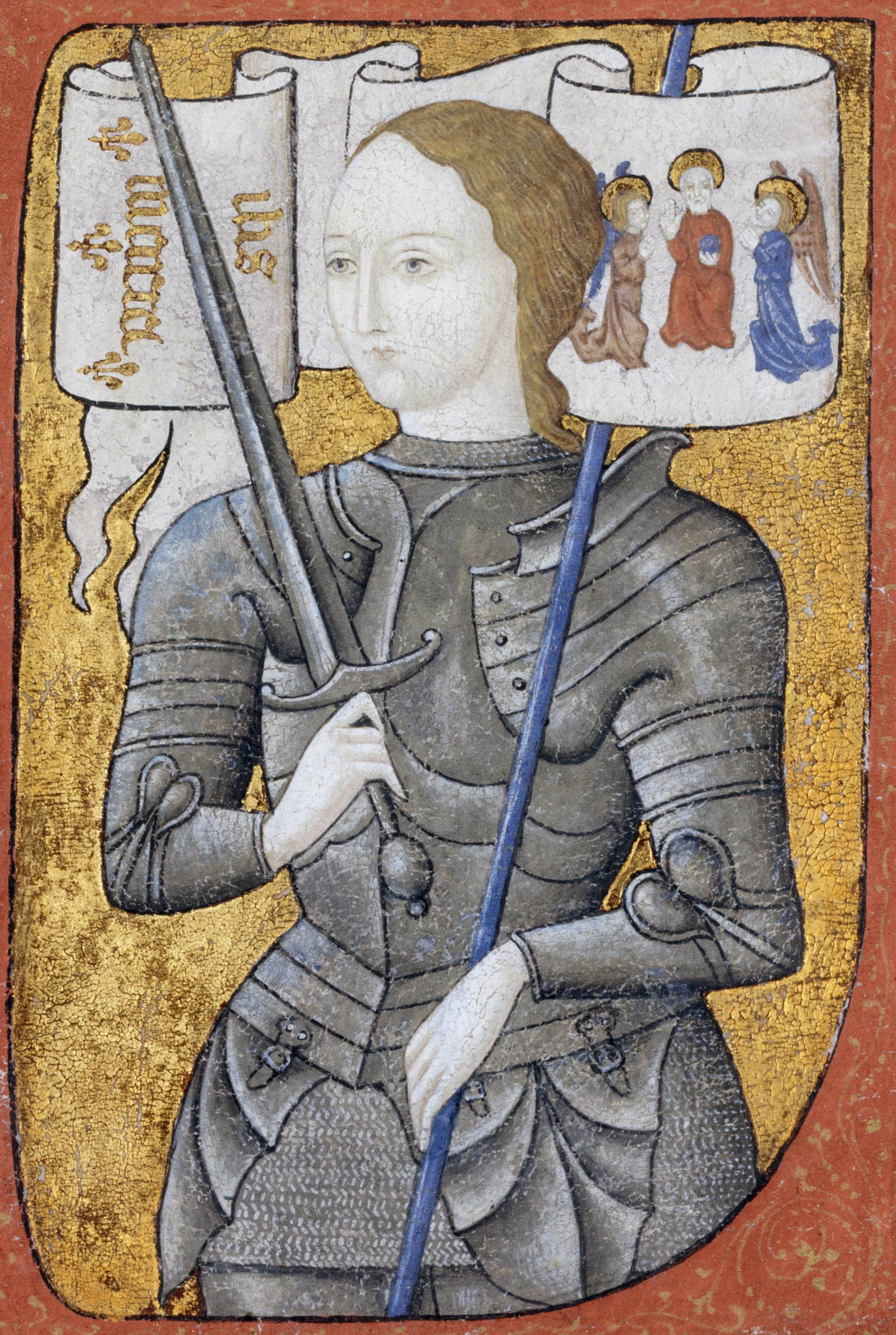
Joan of Arc (1412–1431)

- Elizabeth of Hungary (d.1231)
- Rose of Viterbo (d. 1251)
- Ferdinand III of Castile (d. 1252)
- Louis IX of France (d.1270)
- Margaret of Cortona (d. 1297)
- Ivo of Kermartin (d.1303)
- Amato Ronconi of Saldezzo (d.1304)
- Angela of Foligno (d.1309)
- Elzéar of Sabran (d.1323)
- Roch (d.1327)
- Elizabeth of Portugal (d.1336)
- Conrad of Piacenza (d.1351)
- Bridget of Sweden (d.1373)
- Joan of Arc (d.1431)
- Catherine of Genoa (d.1510)
- Thomas More (d.1535)
- Angela Merici (d. 1540)
- Charles Borromeo (d.1584)
- Jane Frances de Chantal (d.1641)
- Mariana de Jesús de Paredes (d.1645)
- Peter of Saint Joseph Betancur (d.1667)
- Mary Frances of the Five Wounds (d.1791)
- Giuseppe Benedetto Cottolengo (d.1842)
- Vincenza Gerosa (d.1847)
- Vincent Pallotti (d.1850)
- Emily de Vialar (d.1856)
- John Vianney (d.1859)
- Joseph Cafasso (d.1860)
- Marie-Azélie Guérin (d. 1877)
- Marguerite Bays (d.1879)
- Maria Giuseppa Rossello (d.1880)
- John Bosco (d.1888)
- Pope Pius X (d.1914)
- Luigi Guanella (d.1915)
- Frances Xavier Cabrini (d.1917)
- Pope John XXIII (d.1963)

Seventeen members of the Third Order of St. Francis were included in the canonization of the 26 Martyrs of Japan. More members of the Third Order of St. Francis were included in the canonization of the Martyrs of Japan and the Chinese Martyrs.

Numerous Secular Franciscans have been beatified, including:

- Gerardo Mecatti da Villamagna (c. 1174 - 13 May 1242), also a professed member of the Order of St. John, beatified on 18 March 1833
- Umiliana de' Cerchi (c.1219 - 19 May 1246), widow, beatified on 24 July 1694
- Lucchese di Poggibonsi (c. 1180 - 28 April 1260), the first Franciscan tertiay, beatified on 25 March 1697
- Pope Gregory X (Teobaldo Visconti) (c. 1210 – 10 January 1276), Bishop of Rome, beatified on 8 July 1713
- Novellone of Faenza (died 27 July 1280), pilgrim and penitent, beatified on 4 June 1817
- Pietro Pettinaio di Siena (c. 1189 - 4 December 1289), comb-maker, beatified on 18 August 1802
- Gerardo di Monte Santo (de Lunel) (c. 1275 - c. 1298), hermit, beatified on 1 August 1742
- Bartolo Buonpedoni da San Gimignano (c.1228 – 12 December 1300), priest, beatified on 27 April 1910
- Giovanni Pelingotto (c. 1240 – 1 June 1304), hermit, beatified on 13 November 1918
- Giovanna da Signa (c. 1245 – 9 November 1307), recluse, beatified on 21 September 1798
- Giacomo Villa l'Elemosiniere ("the Almsgiver") (c. 1260/1270 - 15 January 1312), martyr of the Servite Order who might also be a Secular Franciscan, beatified on 17 May 1806
- Ramon Llull (c. 1232 - possibly 25 March 1315 or 1316), philosopher, beatified on 11 September 1847
- Vivaldo Stricchi da San Gimignano (c. 1260 - 1 May 1320), disciple of Bl. Bartolo Buonpedoni, beatified on 13 February 1908
- Pietro Cresci da Foligno (c. 1243 - c. 1323), hermit, beatified on 11 May 1400
- Giovanni Cini della Pace da Pisa (c. 1270 - c. 1335), professed religious, beatified on 10 September 1857
- Cecco da Pesaro (c. 1270 - 5 August 1350), professed religious, beatified on 31 March 1859
- Michelina Metelli Malatesta da Pesaro (c. 1300 – 19 June 1356), tertiary, beatified on 13 April 1737
- Delphina of Glandeves (c. 1284 - 26 November 1358), Countess of Sabran through her marriage with Saint Elzear of Sabran, beatified on 24 July 1694
- Charles de Blois-Châtillon (c. 1319 – 29 September 1364), Duke of Brittany, beatified on 14 December 1904
- Giovanni Saziari (c. 1327 - 21 April 1371), farmer, beatified on 9 December 1980
- Ugolino Magalotti da Fiegni (c. 1300 - 11 December 1373), hermit, beatified on 4 December 1856
- Lucia da Caltagirone (died c. 1400), tertiary, beatified on 4 June 1514
- Oddino Barrotti (c. 1344 - 7 July 1400), priest, beatified on 3 September 1808
- Guglielmo Buccheri (Cuffitelli) da Noto (c. 1309 - 4 April 1404), hermit, beatified on 9 April 1537
- Jeanne-Marie de Maillé (14 April 1331 − 28 March 1414), noblewoman and anchoress, beatified on 27 April 1871
- Pietro Gambacorta da Pisa (15 February 1355 - 17 June 1435), co-founder of the (now-extinct) Poor Hermits of St. Jerome, beatified on 9 November 1693
- Tommaso Bellacci da Firenze (c. 1370 - 31 October 1447), butcher, beatified on 24 August 1771
- Nicola da Forca Palena (10 September 1349 – 1 October 1449), co-founder of the (now-extinct) Poor Hermits of St. Jerome, beatified on 27 August 1771
- Elisabetta Amodei da Palermo (c. 1465 - 4 February 1498), noblewoman, beatified on 11 September 1730
- Paola Gambara-Costa (3 March 1463 - 24 January 1515), noblewoman, beatified on 14 August 1845
- Ludovica Albertoni della Cetera (c. 1473 - 31 January 1533), noblewoman, beatified on 28 January 1671
- Ippolito Galantini (14 October 1565 – 20 March 1619), teacher and founder of the Congregation of Christian Doctrine and titled the "Apostle of Florence", beatified on 19 June 1825
- Johannes Hara Mondo (died 4 December 1623), martyr of Japan, beatified on 24 November 2008
- Leo of Satsuma, Lucia de Freitas and 17 Companions (died between 10 September 1622 to 3 September 1632), Martyrs of Japan, beatified on 7 May 1867
- Cristóbal of Saint Catherine (25 July 1638 – 21 July 1690), founder of the Franciscan Hospitallers of Jesus of Nazareth, beatified on 7 April 2013
- Elisabetta Sanna Porcu (23 April 1788 – 17 February 1857), married layperson and also a member of the Union of the Catholic Apostolate, beatified on 17 September 2016
- Nazju Falzon (1 July 1813 – 1 July 1865), Maltese cleric and tertiary, beatified on 9 May 2001
- Giuseppe Antonio Tovini (14 March 1841 – 16 January 1897), banker and lawyer, beatified on 20 September 1998
- Teresa Manganiello (1 January 1849 – 4 November 1876), tertiary, beatified on 22 May 2010
- Maria Franziska Schervier (3 January 1819 – 14 December 1876), founder of the Poor Sisters of St. Francis and the Franciscan Sisters of the Poor, beatified on 28 April 1974
- Antoine Chevrier (16 April 1825 – 2 October 1879), founder of the Sisters of Prado and the Institute of the Priests of Prado, beatified on 4 October 1986
- Pope Pius IX (1846-1878), the longest verified of any pope in history, and second only to Saint Peter
- Contardo Ferrini (5 April 1859 – 17 October 1902), jurist, legal scholar, and also a member of the Society of Saint Vincent de Paul, beatified on 13 April 1947
- Aniela (Angela) Salawa (9 September 1881 – 12 March 1922), Polish tertiary, beatified on 13 August 1991
- Eurosia Fabris Barban (27 September 1866 – 8 January 1932), mother of a family, beatified on 6 November 2005
- Ceferino Giménez Malla (26 August 1861 – 9 August 1936), Romani catechist and also a member of the Society of Saint Vincent de Paul martyred during the Spanish Civil War, beatified on 4 May 1997
- Pedro Sanchez Barba and Fulgencio Martinez Garcia (died between 4 September 1936 and 4 October 1936), Martyrs of the Spanish Civil War from the Diocese of Catagena, beatified on 13 October 2013
- Franz Jägerstätter (20 May 1907 – 9 August 1943), German conscientious objector during World War II and martyr of the faith, beatified on 26 October 2007
- Lucien Botovasoa (c. 1908 – 14 April 1947), Madagascan teacher and martyr, beatified on 15 April 2018
- Armida Barelli (1 December 1882 – 15 August 1952), co-founder of the Secular Institute of the Missionaries of the Kingship of Christ, beatified on 30 April 2022
- Veronica Antal (7 December 1935 – 24 August 1958), Romanian martyr of chastity, beatified on 22 September 2018
- Luis Obdulio Arroyo Navarro (21 June 1950 – 1 July 1981), Guatemalan missionary and martyr, beatified on 27 October 2018

Declared Blessed by popular acclaim:

- Buonadonna de' Segni (died 28 April 1260), who, along with her husband Lucchese di Poggibonsi, were the first Franciscan tertiaries
- Bonavita da Lugo (c. 1238 – 1 March 1275), penitent
- Marzio da Pieve di Compresseto (c. 1210 - 8 October 1301), hermit
- Galeotto Roberto Malatesta (3 February 1411 – 10 October 1432), condottiero and Lord of Rimini

One other Secular Franciscan has served as Bishop of Rome (Pope):

- Gregory IX (d.1241)

Other famous Secular Franciscans include:

- Dante Alighieri (d.1321)
- Giotto di Bondone (d.1337)
- Cola di Rienzo (d.1354)
- Petrarch (d.1374)
- Christopher Columbus (d.1506)
- Raphael (d.1520)
- Vasco da Gama (d.1524)
- Michelangelo (d.1564)
- Giovanni Pierluigi da Palestrina (d.1594)
- Miguel de Cervantes (d.1616)
- Lope de Vega (d.1635)
- Luigi Galvani (d.1798)
- Alessandro Volta (d.1827)
- André-Marie Ampère (d.1836)
- Gabriel García Moreno (d. 1875)
- Lady Georgiana Fullerton (d.1885)
- Franz Liszt (d.1886)
- Henry Edward Manning (d.1892)
- Charles Gounod (d.1893)
- Louis Pasteur (d.1895)
- Coventry Patmore (d.1896)
- Herbert Vaughan (d.1903)
- Elizabeth, Lady Herbert of Lea (d.1911)
- Tomás Mac Curtain (d.1920)
- Terence MacSwiney (d.1920)
- Antonio Gaudi (d. 1926)
- Joe McCann (d.1972)
- John Michael Talbot

== See also ==
- Little Flowers of St. Francis
- Third Order of Saint Francis
- Third Order Regular of Saint Francis of Penance
