= List of Catholic charities in the Roman Catholic Archdiocese of New York =

The Archdiocese of New York covers New York, Bronx, and Richmond Counties in New York City (coterminous with the boroughs of Manhattan, the Bronx, and Staten Island, respectively), as well as Dutchess, Orange, Putnam, Rockland, Sullivan, Ulster, and Westchester counties in New York state. It is home to over 100 charitable organizations, run by many different religious orders, as well as by Catholic Charities of the archdiocese.

== Homes/nurseries for children ==
- Astor Home for Children (Rhinebeck) - Opened in 1953 and staffed by the Daughters of Charity of St. Vincent de Paul until 2002. Sponsorship turned over to the archdiocese in 2002.
- Cardinal Hayes Home for Children (Millbrook) - Opened in 1941; sponsored by the Franciscan Missionaries of Mary.
- Cardinal McCloskey School & Home for Children (White Plains) - Opened in 1948.
- Hayden House (Ossining) - Opened in 1980 as a home for maltreated children and run by Cardinal McCloskey School & Home for Children.
- Lincoln Hall (Somers) - Opened in 1938 to replace the Bronx Protectorate; formerly staffed by the Lasallian Christian Brothers.
- Nazareth Day Nursery (Manhattan) - Opened in 1902 at 214 W. 15th Street; staffed by Sisters of St. Francis of the Neumann Communities.
- The New York Foundling (Manhattan) - Established in 1869 by the Sisters of Charity of New York.
- Queen's Daughters' Day Nursery (Yonkers) - Assumed in 1948 by the Missionary Canonesses of St. Augustine (now the Missionary Sisters of the Immaculate Heart of Mary).
- St. Agatha Home for Children (Nanuet) - Opened in 1885 and staffed by the Sisters of Charity. Has now merged with the New York Foundling.
- St. Cabrini Home (West Park) - Opened in 1890 and formerly known as the Sacred Heart Orphan Asylum. Staffed by the Missionary Sisters of the Sacred Heart of Jesus.
- St. Dominic Home (Blauvelt) - Opened in 1890 as St. Dominic Orphan Asylum and staffed by the Dominican Sisters of Blauvelt.
- St. Ignatius Day Nursery (Manhattan) - Established in 1910; formerly staffed by the Sisters of Bon Secours (1913–17), Sisters of Charity and Sisters of St. Dominic.

== Homes for the aged ==
- Carmel Richmond Nursing Home (Staten Island) - Sponsored by the Carmelite Sisters for the Aged and Infirm.
- Ferncliff Nursing Home (Rhinebeck) - Opened in 1973; sponsored by the Carmelite Sisters for the Aged and Infirm.
- Francis Schervier Home and Hospital (The Bronx) - Opened and operated by the Franciscan Sisters of the Poor, transferred to the Missionary Sisters of the Sacred Heart.
- Jeanne Jugan Residence (The Bronx) - Sponsored by the Little Sisters of the Poor, built to replace their Home for Aged which was last located on 183rd Street in the Bronx.
- Kateri Residence (Manhattan) - Sponsored by the archdiocese.
- Mary Manning Walsh Nursing Home (Manhattan) - Opened in 1952; sponsored by the Carmelite Sisters for the Aged and Infirm.
- Providence Rest Nursing Home (The Bronx) - Opened in 1921; founded and staffed by the Sisters of St. John the Baptist.
- Rosary Hill Home (Hawthorne) - Opened in 1901; sponsored by the Dominican Sisters of Hawthorne.
- St. Cabrini Nursing Home (Dobbs Ferry) - Sponsored by the Missionary Sisters of the Sacred Heart.
- St. Elizabeth Ann Rehabilitation Center (Staten Island) - Opened in 1993; sponsored by the Sisters of Charity of New York.
- St. Joseph's Hospital Nursing Home (Yonkers) - Opened in 1976, operated by St. Joseph's Medical Center. sponsored by the Sisters of Charity of New York.
- St. Patrick Home for the Aged (The Bronx) - Sponsored by the Carmelite Sisters for the Aged and Infirm.
- St. Teresa Nursing & Rehabilitation Center (Middletown) - Opened in 1971; sponsored by the archdiocese.
- St. Vincent de Paul Residence (The Bronx) - Opened in 1992; sponsored by the archdiocese.

== Retreat/spiritual centers ==
- Bethany Spiritual Center (Highland Mills) - Operated by the Religious of Jesus and Mary.
- Divine Compassion Spirituality Center (White Plains) - Operated by the Sisters of the Divine Compassion.
- Dominican Spiritual Center (Sparkill) - Operated by the Dominican Sisters of Sparkill.
- Franciscan Spiritual Center (Hastings-on-Hudson) - Operated by the Sisters of St. Francis.
- Graymoor Spiritual Life Center (Garrison) - Operated by the Franciscan Friars of the Atonement.
- Jogues Retreat Center (Cornwall) - Operated by the Society of Jesus.
- Linwood Spiritual Center (Rhinebeck) - Opened in 1968; operated by the Society of St. Ursula.
- Mariandale Retreat Center (Ossining) - Operated by the Dominican Sisters of Hope.
- Mount Alvernia Retreat Center (Wappingers Falls) - Opened in 1968; operated by the Immaculate Conception Province of the Order of Friars Minor.
- Mount St. Alphonsus Retreat Center (Esopus) - Opened in 1984; operated by the Redemptorist Fathers.
- Our Lady of Mount Kisco Retreat Center (Mount Kisco) - Opened in 1994; operated by the Legion of Christ.
- Our Lady of Thornwood Retreat Center (Thornwood) - Opened in 1996; operated by the Legion of Christ
- Salesian Retreat Center & Marion Shrine (Stony Point) - Opened in 1971; operated by the Salesians of Don Bosco.
- Trinity Retreat Center (Larchmont) - Opened in 1974; operated by the Archdiocese of New York, dedicated to the spiritual renewal of the clergy of the archdiocese, staffed by the Franciscan Friars of the Renewal.
- Villa St. Dominic (Glasco) - Operated by the Dominican Sisters of Sparkill.
- Villa St. Joseph (Saugerties) - Operated by the Dominican Sisters of Sparkill.

== Hospitals ==
Most hospitals in the archdiocese are sponsored by different religious orders, not the archdiocese itself:

- Benedictine Hospital (Kingston) - Established in 1901 by the Benedictine Sisters of Elizabeth, N.J.; formerly known as Our Lady of Victory Hospital.
- Bon Secours Community Hospital (Port Jervis) - Founded by the Sisters of Bon Secours of Maryland, now sponsored by the Bon Secours Charity Health System.
- Calvary Hospital (The Bronx) - Opened in 1899 as a hospice facility; sponsored by the archdiocese.
- Good Samaritan Hospital (Suffern) - Sponsored by the Bon Secours Charity Health System.
- St. Anthony Community Hospital (Warwick) - Founded by the Franciscan Sisters of the Poor, now sponsored by the Bon Secours Charity Health System (BSCHS).
- St. Francis Hospital (Poughkeepsie) - Established by the Sisters of St. Francis of Hastings-on-Hudson. Branch location in Beacon.
- St. Joseph's Medical Center (Yonkers) - Established in 1888 by the Sisters of Charity of New York.
- St. Vincent's Hospital Westchester (Harrison) - Established by the Sisters of Charity of New York as a suburban branch of their primary hospital founded in the Greenwich Village section of Manhattan which was founded in 1850; when the Manhattan site was closed in 2010, this facility was transferred to St. Joseph's Medical Center in Yonkers, New York, currently provides mental health treatment services and addiction recovery programs.
- Terence Cardinal Cooke Health Care Center (Manhattan) - Established in 1890 as the Flower Free Surgical Hospital; merged in 1938 with Fifth Avenue Hospital. Known as Flower Fifth Avenue Hospital from 1938 to 1984, the facility was bought by the Archdiocese of New York in 1984 and opened as a nursing home.

== Institutions that have closed in the archdiocese ==
- Cabrini Medical Center (Manhattan) - Opened in 1973 from the merger of Columbus and Italian hospitals. Closed in 2008 by the Berger Commission of the State of New York.
- Camp Dineen (New Paltz) - Summer camp for boys run by the archdiocese.
- Camp Dominican (Staatsburg) - Summer camp for boys and girls run by the Dominican Sisters.
- Camp Hayes (Port Jervis) - Summer camp for boys run by the archdiocese; opened in 1921.
- Camp Joachim (Beacon) - Summer camp run by the archdiocese.
- Camp Linwood (Rhinebeck) - Summer camp run by the Society of St. Ursula; operated from 1964 to 1967.
- Camp St. Agnes (Esopus) - Summer camp run by St. Agnes Church in Manhattan. Opened ca. 1925 and sold ca. 1946 to the Marist Brothers. The Brothers used the property as a campsite and recreational property until the 1960s.
- Camp St. Edward (Staten Island) - Summer camp run by the Franciscan Handmaids of Mary. Operated from 1952 to 2003.
- Carroll Vacation Camp (Pawling) - Vacation camp for business women run by the Carroll Club and Catholic Charities; opened in 1929.
- Catholic Protectory (The Bronx) - Opened in 1863 as a home for delinquent and destitute children. Moved in 1938 when the property was sold by the Archdiocese to the Metropolitan Life Insurance Company to build the Parkchester apartment complex to Lincolndale and renamed Lincoln Hall. Staffed by the Lasallian Christian Brothers
- Col. John Jacob Astor Home for Children (Rhinebeck) - Operated from 1946 to 1953 and staffed by the Dominican Sisters of Blauvelt.
- Columbus Hospital (Manhattan) - Opened in 1893 and staffed by the Missionary Sisters of the Sacred Heart. Merged in 1973 with Italian Hospital and was renamed Cabrini Medical Center.
- Girls' Catholic Club (Manhattan) - Located at 52 E. 126th St., the club was operated by the Sisters of Divine Compassion.
- French Hospital (Manhattan) - Staffed by the Marianite Sisters of Holy Cross.
- Holiday Farm (Rhinebeck) - Operated from 1914 to 1940 as a home for convalescent children; staffed by the Dominican Sisters of Blauvelt.
- House of Divine Providence (Grasmere, Staten Island) - Opened in 1906 as a home for aged French women; staffed by the Marianite Sisters of Holy Cross.
- House of the Good Shepherd (Manhattan) (Manhattan) - Opened in 1858 as a home for women; staffed by the Sisters of the Good Shepherd.
- House of the Holy Family (Manhattan) - Opened in 1874 as a home for young women; staffed by the Sisters of Divine Compassion. Closed in 1927.
- Institute of Christian Doctrine (Manhattan) - Located at 171-75 Cherry Street, the center was run by the Sisters of Our Lady of Christian Doctrine and taught industrial and religious classes.
- Institution of Mercy (Manhattan) - Opened in 1865 as a home for destitute women and children; closed in 1945. Located on Madison Ave. at E. 81st Street.
- Institution of Mercy (Tarrytown) - Opened in 1900 as a branch of the New York location; moved in 1960 to Mount Mercy in Dobbs Ferry.
- John J. Watts Residence for Girls (Manhattan) - Opened in 1949 and operated by the Missionary Canonesses of St. Augustine (now the Missionary Sisters of the Immaculate Heart of Mary).
- Josephine Baird Home for the Aged (Manhattan) - Opened in 1955; operated by the Carmelite Sisters for the Aged & Infirm. Located at 340 W. 55th Street.
- Little Sisters of the Poor Home for the Aged - The sisters operated three nursing homes in the city that have closed: 213 E. 70th St. and 135 W. 106th St. in Manhattan and 660 E. 183rd St. in the Bronx, replaced by the Jeanne Jugan Residence.
- Lieutenant Joseph P. Kennedy, Jr. Home for Children (The Bronx) - Operated from 1950 to 1979. The site is now owned and used by United Cerebral Palsy of New York City, Inc. 1770 Stillwell Ave.
- Linwood Day Nursery (Rhinebeck) - Run by the Society of St. Ursula; operated from 1964 to 1981.
- Madonna Day Nursery (Manhattan) - Run by the Sisters of Our Lady of the Christian Doctrine.
- Mission of the Immaculate Virgin at Mount Loretto (Staten Island) - Opened in 1870 and run by the Sisters of St. Francis of Hastings-on-Hudson. Included on the grounds were the Home for Industrious Boys, St. Elizabeth Home for Girls and St. Joseph Asylum for Blind Girls.
- Mount Carmel Home for the Aged & Infirm (Manhattan) - Opened in 1939; operated by the Carmelite Sisters for the Aged & Infirm. Located at 539 W. 54th Street.
- Mount Mongola (Ellenville) - Summer camp run by the Mission Helpers of the Sacred Heart (1939).
- Our Lady of Mercy Medical Center (The Bronx) - Established in 1887 as Misericordia Hospital by the Sisters of Misericorde; formerly located in Staten Island (1887–1893) and Manhattan (1893–1958); the hospital was turned over to the archdiocese in 1976. Sold in 2008 to Montefiore Medical Center and became non-sectarian.
- Passionist Spiritual Center & Cardinal Spellman Retreat House (The Bronx) - Founded in 1965 and operated by the Passionist Fathers, closed January 1, 2011.
- Regina Angelorum (Manhattan) - Staffed by the Sisters of Mercy.
- Regina Coeli Villa (Dobbs Ferry) - Orphan Asylum run by the Missionary Sisters of the Sacred Heart.
- Seton Hospital for Incurables (Spuyten Duyvil) - Opened in 1895 and staffed by the Sisters of Charity. Sold to New York City Dept. of Health and became non-sectarian in 1948 and closed in 1955.
- Society of St. Vincent de Paul Convalescent Home (Spring Valley - Opened in 1906; staffed by the Sisters of Mercy.
- St. Agnes Home for Children (Sparkill) - Opened in 1880 and staffed by the Dominican Sisters of Sparkill; closed in 1976.
- St. Agnes Hospital (White Plains) - Opened in 1908 and staffed by the Sisters of St. Francis of Hastings-on-Hudson. Ownership transferred to the archdiocese in 1988 and closed in 2003.
- St. Ann Home for Children (Peekskill) - Opened in 1880 and run by the Sisters of the Good Shepherd at Mount Florence.
- St. Ann Maternity Hospital (Manhattan) - Run by the Sisters of Charity, the hospital was located at 130 E. 69th Street.
- St. Benedict the Moor Home for Colored Children (Rye) - Operated from 1896 to 1938 and run by the Sisters of St. Francis of Hastings-on-Hudson.
- St. Clare Hospital (Manhattan) - Opened in 1934 and staffed by the Sisters of Charity (1934–2007) and the Franciscan Sisters of Alleghany (1934–1981). Merged with St. Vincent Medical Center in 2003 and closed in 2007.
- St. Clare Eye, Ear & Throat Hospital (Manhattan) - Operated from 1945 to 1961; staffed by the Franciscan Sisters of Alleghany.
- St. Eleanora Home for Convalescents (Tuckahoe) - Staffed by the Sisters of Charity.
- St. Elizabeth Hospital (Manhattan) - Opened in 1890 and staffed by the Franciscan Sisters of Alleghany (1890–1981).
- St. Francis Home for Working Girls (Manhattan) - Located at 12 W. 129th St., the home was operated by the Missionary Sisters of St. Francis between 1896 and 1942.
- St. Francis Hospital (The Bronx) - Founded and staffed by the Franciscan Sisters of the Poor; operated from 1865 to 1966.
- St. Francis Hospital (Port Jervis) - Staffed by the Sisters of St. Francis of Hastings-on-Hudson; opened in 1924.
- St. John Day Nursery (Manhattan) - Opened in 1886 at 223 E. 67th Street and staffed by the Sisters of Charity.
- St. Joseph Children's Home (Peekskill) - Staffed by the Franciscan Missionaries of the Sacred Heart; opened in 1879.
- St. Joseph Health Resort & Mountain School (Monticello) - Staffed by the Sisters of St. Dominic; housed a summer camp for both girls and boys. The resort was also the summer residence of Cardinal Hayes from 1925 until his death in 1938.
- St. Joseph Home for the Aged (Manhattan) - Opened in 1870 and staffed by the Sisters of Charity; closed in 1939.
- St. Joseph Hospital for Chest Diseases (The Bronx) - Staffed by the Franciscan Sisters of the Poor; operated from 1888 to 1962.
- St. Mary of the Angels Home (Hawthorne) - Opened in 1900 and staffed by the Sisters of Misericorde.
- St. Mary Orphan Asylum (Port Jervis) - Staffed by the Sisters of Charity.
- St. Michael Orphanage (Staten Island) - Opened in 1884 and staffed by the Presentation Sisters.
- St. Pascal Day Nursery (Manhattan) - Opened in 1902 at 334 E. 22nd St.; staffed by the Mission Helpers of the Sacred Heart (1907-??).

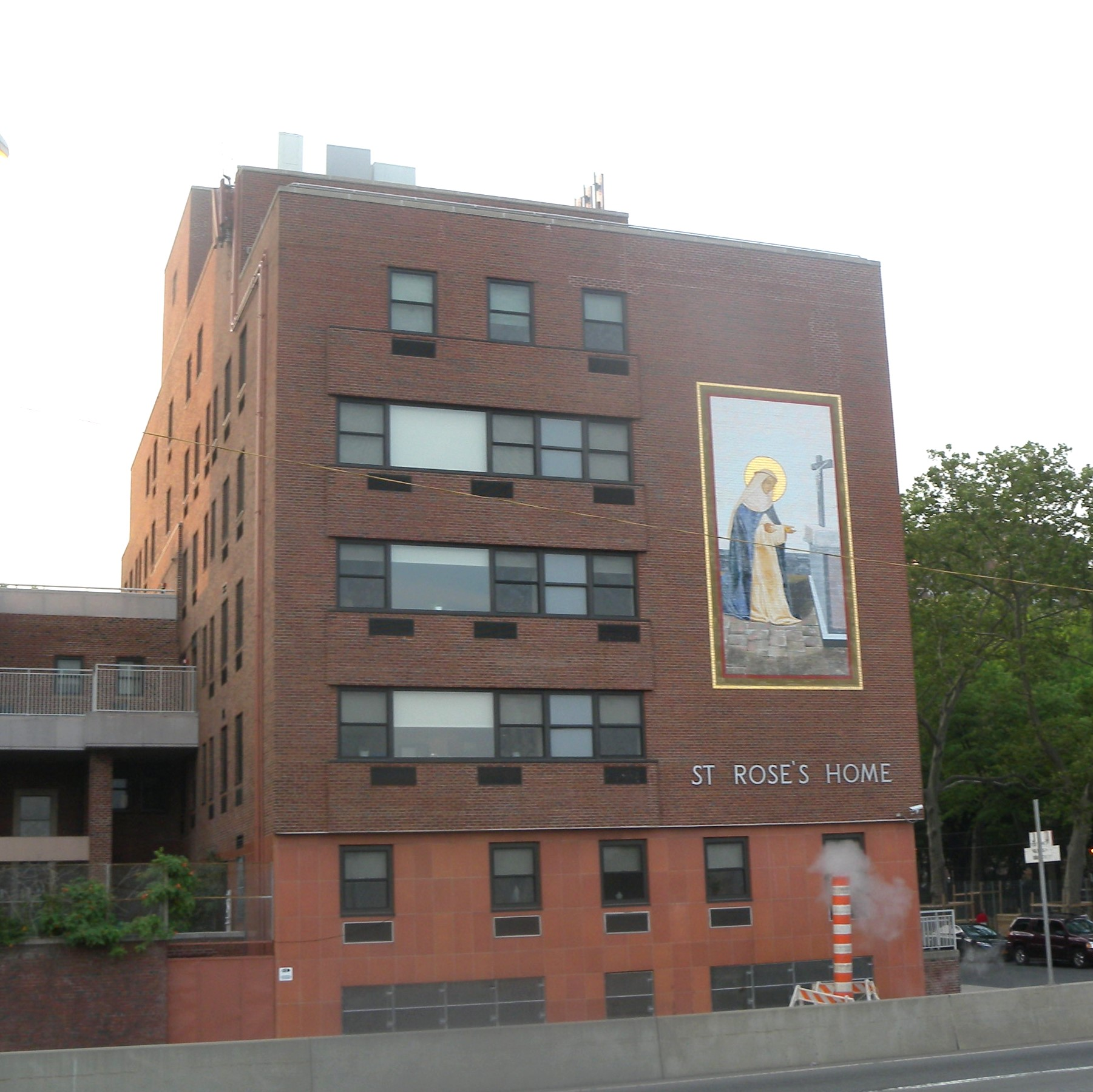
St Rose Home

- St. Rose Home (Manhattan) - Sponsored by the Dominican Sisters of Hawthorne; operated from 1912 to 2009.
- St. Vincent Hospital (Manhattan) - Opened in 1849 and staffed by the Sisters of Charity; closed in 2010.
- St. Vincent de Paul Orphan Asylum (Manhattan) - Opened in 1868 and staffed by the Marianite Sisters of the Holy Cross.
- St. Zita's Home for Friendless Women (Manhattan) - Opened in 1890 and staffed by the Sisters of St. Zita, moved in 2002 to Monsey, New York, where it became the St. Zita Villa.
- Villa of Our Lady of Lourdes (Yonkers) - Run by Holy Eucharist Church and staffed by the Sisters of Mercy.

== See also ==
- Alfred E. Smith Memorial Foundation Dinner
