= William Hayden House =

William Hayden House may refer to:

- William Hayden House (Tecumseh, Michigan), listed on the National Register of Historic Places (NRHP) in Lenawee County
- William Hayden House (Albany, Vermont), listed on the NRHP in Orleans County

== See also ==
- Hayden House (disambiguation)
