= St. Francis Hospital (New York City) =

- Poor Sisters of St. Francis
- Location in The Bronx shown within New York City

Geography
- Location: 407-409 East 5th Street, Manhattan (1865); 609 East 5th Street, Manhattan; 525 East 142nd Street, Mott Haven, Bronx (1906), New York City, New York, United States
- Coordinates: 40.810448°N 73.917139°W

Services
- Beds: 240 in 1892, 380 in 1966

History
- Founded: May 1, 1865; 161 years ago
- Closed: 1966; 60 years ago

Links
- Lists: Hospitals in New York State
- Other links: Hospitals in Manhattan; Hospitals in The Bronx

St. Francis Hospital is a former Catholic hospital which operated in New York City during the 19th and 20th centuries.

== History ==
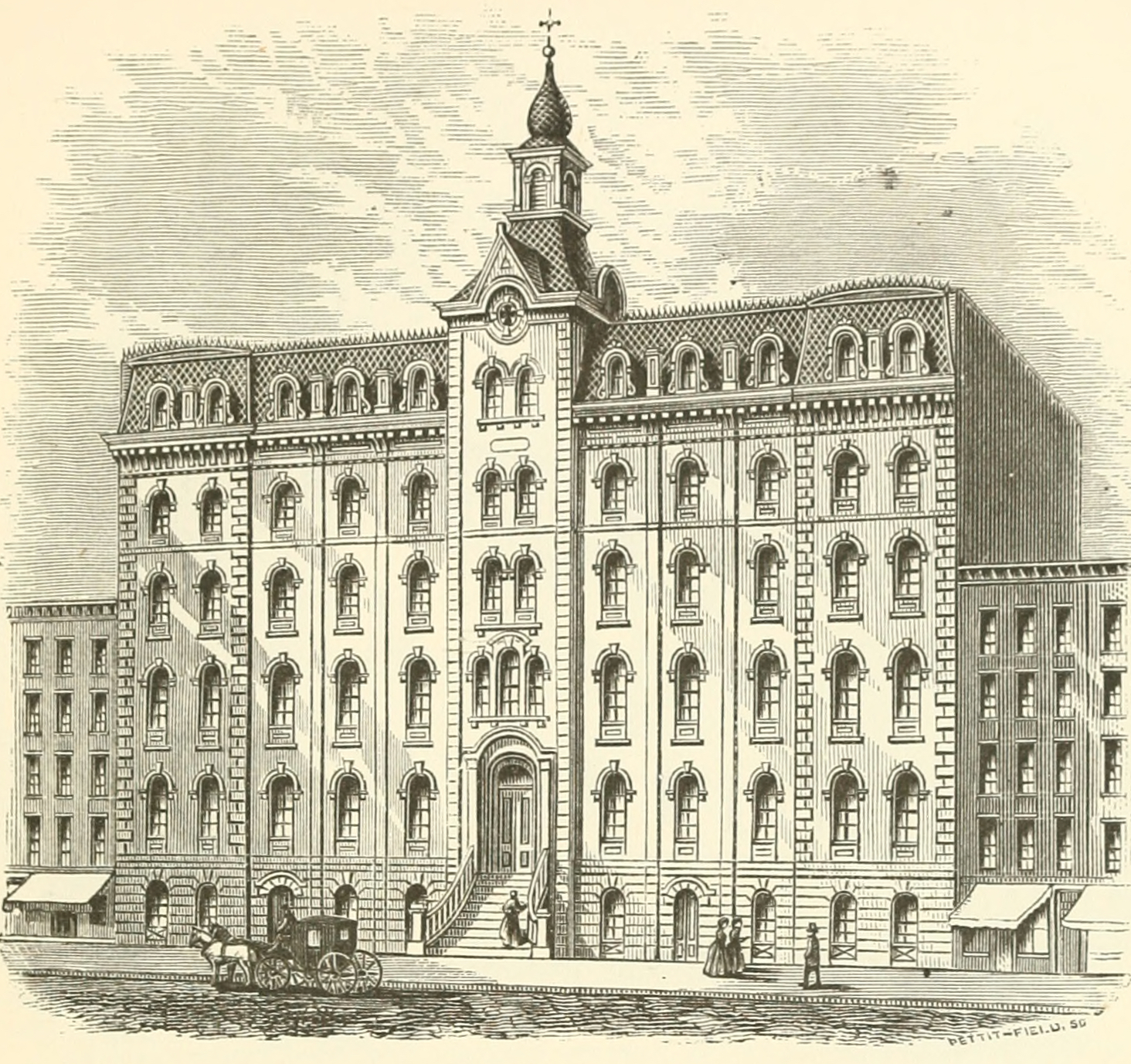
St. Francis Hospital c. 1870

It was founded in 1865 by the Poor Sisters of St. Francis, who had been founded in Germany in 1851 by Mother Frances Schervier.

In the late 19th century and early 20th century it was located at 407-409 East 5th Street, Manhattan, where it served the large German immigrant population of the Lower East Side. In 1892 it had 240 beds. In 1906 the hospital moved to 525 East 142nd Street, in the Mott Haven section of the Bronx, also largely populated by German immigrants.

The hospital provided free care to all comers without respect to nationality or religion. Faced with a crumbling infrastructure, for which there were not sufficient funds to replace, the hospital was closed by the Archdiocese of New York on December 31, 1966, amidst wide popular protest.

In 1970, a 17-story New York City Housing complex was built on the site.
