= Eurosia Fabris =

Italian Third order Franciscan and Blessed

Blessed Eurosia Fabris, TOSF
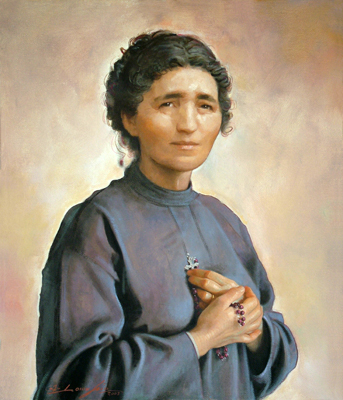
- Portrait of the Blessed Eurosia Fabris
- Born: 27 September 1866; Quinto Vicentino, Vicenzia, Kingdom of Lombardy-Venetia
- Died: 8 January 1932 (aged 65); Marola, Veneto, Kingdom of Italy
- Venerated in: Catholic Church (Third Order of Saint Francis)
- Beatified: 6 November 2005, Vicenza, Italy by Pope Benedict XVI
- Feast: 8 January

Eurosia Fabris, TOSF, also known as "Mamma Rosa", (27 September 1866 – 8 January 1932), was an Italian member of the Third Order of Saint Francis in the Roman Catholic Church. She was beatified in 2005. She is regarded as a model of holiness in the daily life of a Catholic family. Besides her own nine children, she had two adopted ones.

== Biography ==
=== Early life ===
Eurosia Fabris was born to farmers Luigi and Maria Fabris on 27 September 1866, in Quinto Vicentino, a small, agricultural area near the Italian town of Vicenza. In 1870, at the age of four, she and her family moved to the nearby village of Marola, also in the Province of Vicenza, where she lived for the rest of her life. She was able to attend school for only two years, between 1872 and 1874, because she needed to help her parents with farm work and domestic chores. However, she was still able to learn enough to read several religious texts in her youth, most notably the Bible, the Catechism, about the history of the Roman Catholic Church, the Philothea of Francis de Sales, and the Eternal Maxims of Alphonsus Liguori.

When Fabris was twelve years old, she received her first Holy Communion, and from then on as often as permitted.

Fabris joined the "Association of the Daughters of Mary" in the parish church of Marola and was a devoted member. She was known as an agent of good will in her family, among her friends, and in her parish, where she taught catechism to the children and sewing to the girls who came to her home.

=== Family life ===
The eighteen-year-old Fabris, commonly known as "Rosina", received several marriage proposals, as she was observed to be a dedicated, pious and hardworking woman. Fabris declined, however, as she did not at that time consider herself called to marriage. In 1885, a young married woman near her home died, leaving three young daughters. One of them died shortly after her mother. The other two, Chiara Angela and Italia, were only 20 months old and 2 months old, respectively. The children's father, Carlo Barban, was away caring for sick relatives. Fabris traveled to the home of these children every morning for six months, to care for them and maintain their home.

After this act of charity, Fabris contemplated the events through prayer and, following the advice of her relatives and that of the parish priest, she decided to marry their father. Eurosia Fabris and Carlo Barban were married on 5 May 1886. Fabris adopted the two orphaned girls and had nine more children of her own. She kept her home open to other children as well, who knew her as "Mamma Rosa". She dedicated her life to her family, teaching her children to pray, to obey, and to practice Christian virtues, reputedly sacrificing her own needs to do so. Her success in these regards is attested by the ordination of three of her sons as Catholic priests, including the Franciscan friar Bernardino, who would become her first biographer.

=== Devotional life and charity ===
Fabris emulated the strong women of the Bible and aimed to become a treasure to her family. It is reported in her biographies that, even in times of crisis, she managed to balance the family budget, while exercising great charity towards the poor, especially towards orphans of World War I. She cared for the sick and gave them continuous assistance, especially during the final illness and death of her husband Carlo, in 1930.

Fabris became a member of the Secular Franciscan Order, the third order founded by St. Francis of Assisi. This she did by attempting to maintain a spirit of poverty and joy in her home. Fabris died on 8 January 1932, and was buried in the church of Marola.

== Beatification ==
Pope Pius XII wished that Fabris's life were better known among all Christian families, and she was proclaimed Venerable on 7 July 2003, by Pope John Paul II. In 2004, a miracle was officially recognized by the Catholic Church as having come through her intervention; she is said to have healed a sick woman thought by doctors to be beyond recovery. On 7 February 2005, the process of canonization was initiated at the Diocesan curia of Padua, after some initial difficulties promoting the cause. In November 2005 Fabria has been beatified.

== Catholic role model ==
Bishop Cesare Nosiglia of Vicenza, who co-presided with Cardinal Saraiva Martins at her beatification, said in his homily that "Mother Rosa represents a model of sanctity accessible to everyone."

Some outside sources objected that the Catholic Church wishes to use Eurosia Fabris as a role model to encourage them and all people in the world to have more children. The Associated Press reported: "The average number of children per woman in the European Union is 1.5, according to EU statistics, but in some countries, including heavily Roman Catholic Italy and Spain, the average is 1.3. Pope Benedict XVI has described large families as useful witnesses to 'faith, courage and optimism' in society."
