= Marguerite Bays =

Swiss Catholic saint

Saint Marguerite Bays OFS
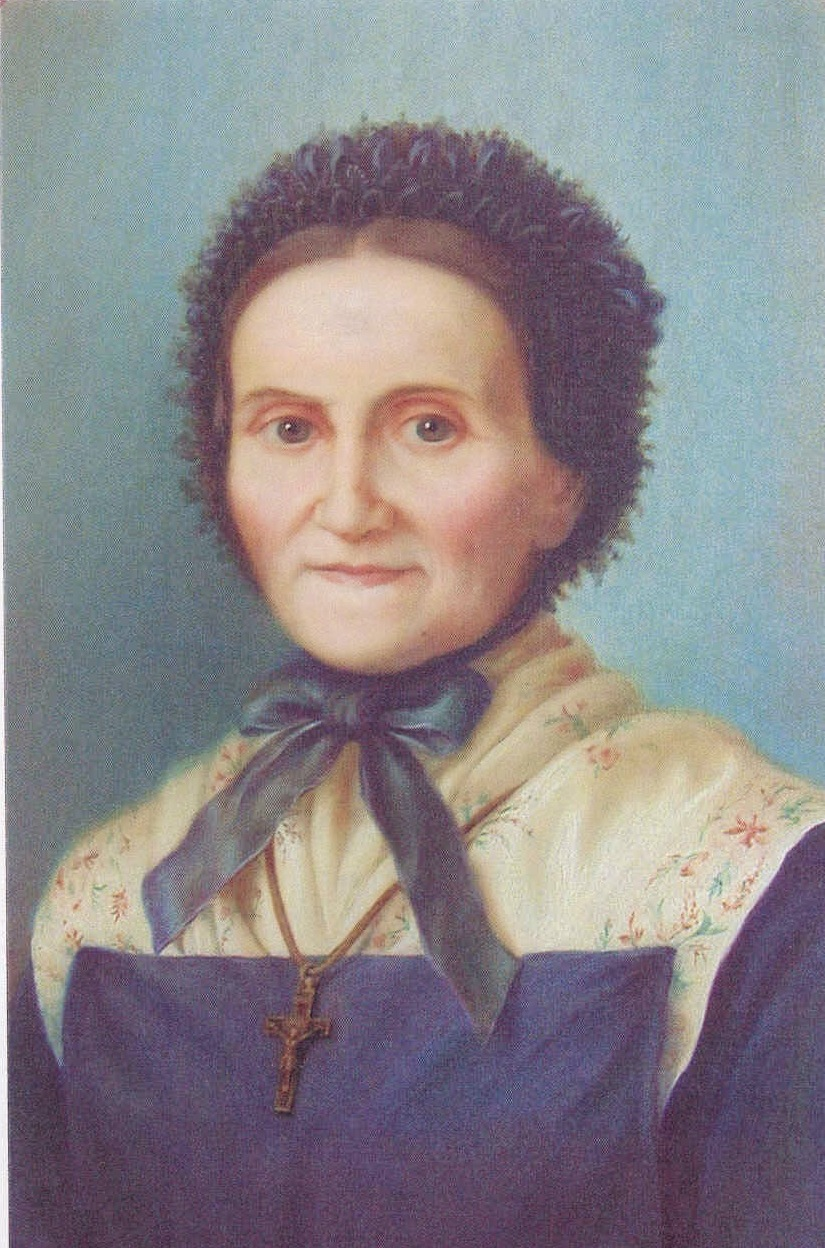

Virgin
- Born: 8 September 1815; Siviriez, Fribourg, Switzerland
- Died: 27 June 1879 (aged 63); Siviriez, Fribourg, Switzerland
- Venerated in: Roman Catholic Church
- Beatified: 29 October 1995, Saint Peter's Basilica, Vatican City by Pope John Paul II
- Canonized: 13 October 2019, Saint Peter's Square, Vatican City by Pope Francis
- Feast: 27 June

Marguerite Bays, OFS (8 September 1815 – 27 June 1879) was a Swiss seamstress and mystic. She lived a simple life as a member of the Secular Franciscan Order and adapted the tenets of the order's charism into her own life and social apostolate, especially after she was healed of bowel cancer on 8 December 1854. She was canonized by Pope Francis on 13 October, 2019.

== Childhood and education ==
Marguerite Bays was born in La Pierraz - a hamlet of Chavannes-les-Forts in the canton of Fribourg - on 8 September 1815 as the second of seven children to Pierre-Antoine Bays and Josephine Morel. She had six siblings: Jean, Marie-Marguerite (known as "Mariette"), Joseph, Blaise (who died aged 12), Seraphine (the last-born), and Claude. Her parents were farmers and devout Christians; Bays herself demonstrated great intelligence as a student while studying at school in Chavannes-les-Forts, and demonstrated a particular, though noted, inclination towards reflection and contemplation, while deciding to cease interacting with her peers at school in favor of the solitude of talking to God. In 1823, she received confirmation, and received her First Communion in 1826. Following this, Bays took an apprenticeship as a seamstress in 1830, before offering her services as a seamstress to different households.

Bays created a small altar in her room at home, where she placed flowers and a statue of the Blessed Virgin Mary. Bays would awaken in the morning to request the intercession of the mother of God at the statue before going outside to complete her duties on the farm. In her spare time, she would tell children about the life of Jesus Christ. Despite the urgings of those around her, Bays dismissed the prospects of taking vows and enter a religious order. Instead, it was her desire to live a virginal life in the world in order to devote herself to an austere life for Jesus Christ.

Bays' family experienced a number of struggles: her sister Marie-Marguerite saw the dissolution of her marriage; her brother Joseph, whose temper was violent, served a prison sentence; and her brother Claude had a child out of wedlock, named François, whom Bays, aged 17, cared for and educated. Claude, then 47, married Josette, the mother of his child, who was considered to be rude to her relatives and fond of humiliating Bays. Despite this, Bays, when Josette became ill, cared for her sister-in-law, up until the point of death.

== Service to the poor ==
It was during her adolescence that some peasant farmers could no longer find work due to the introduction of mechanization in agriculture. But these troubles did not hinder her efforts to serve the poor for she carried milk and bread to them while she would also wash and mend their clothes or even give them new ones to use.

Her devotedness to service of the poor led her to discover the Secular Franciscan Order which she became a member. Marguerite attended Mass on a frequent basis despite a 20-minute walk to the neighboring village of Siviriez and took part in the Eucharistic Adoration following the celebration of the Mass. Marguerite also embarked on pilgrimages to Marian shrines.

Location of her home at La Pierraz.

Marguerite devoted part of her time on teaching catechism to children and often visited those who were ill. In 1853 she contracted bowel cancer and begged the Mother of God to heal her through her intercession. But at the same time she asked that her pain be linked with the suffering of Christ for her condition was her own cross to bear. The disease first came when she began suffering from dizziness and acute pain in her stomach as well as nausea that caused her often to vomit. But she tried to hide this and did not even take medicine for it until the condition was discovered and she was prompted to see a doctor who made the diagnosis and ruled out an operation. On 8 December 1854 - when Pope Pius IX proclaimed the dogma of the Immaculate Conception - she found that she was cured of her illness and she took this as a sign of greater service to both God and neighbour.

The mother abbess of a convent near her (also her goddaughter), Lutgarde Menétrey, and the priest Joseph Schorderet often consulted with her in the founding of the Saint Paul's Work in 1873 which was an initiative that she both supported and encouraged despite the opposition of the Bishop of Fribourg Étienne Marilley.

== Stigmata and death ==
Marguerite later discovered that she had the stigmata around 1854 and consulted with her local bishop to oversee the verification of just how authentic the stigmata were. In addition she began to fall into ecstatic raptures when she would feel the pain of Christ once a week marking his death. She first tried to hide the wounds however her injuries were later recognised and news spread about her condition.

The stigmata was first noticed when she felt intense burning and noticed red blotches appear on her hands as well as on her feet and at her chest. Marguerite was subjected to a medical examination on 11 April 1873 and the doctor allowed for her niece to be present for the examination. Jules Grangier visited her at her home to see the stigmata for himself sometime in 1873 after issuing a series of requests made to see her.

In her last weeks, she had difficulty eating or drinking and was capable of consuming only small amounts of herbal tea with milk and occasionally a light bread soup. Her condition worsened in the weeks leading into Lent of 1879 and she suffered from extreme pain during this period. Marguerite grew frail and thin and her brother Jean said she felt like a bag of bones when he had to lift her. At the time her true condition was unknown and it is said she remained silent in relation to her level of pain during this period. Her symptoms are known to have included acute pain in her head as well as her throat and chest. Marguerite died at 3:00pm on 27 June 1879 following several more weeks of acute pain. Her funeral took place on 30 June 1879. It is said hundreds attended. Her remains were later transferred to the parish church at Siviriez.

== Canonization ==
The beatification process began in Switzerland in 1929 and closed in 1929. Her cause was formally opened in Rome on 24 May 1930, granting Bays the title of Servant of God. Another local process lasted from 1953 to 1955. The two processes were ratified on 13 December 1985. Her writings were investigated and received approved on 25 November 1956. The Positio was forwarded to the Congregation for the Causes of Saints (CCS) in 1986 for further evaluation. Theologians approved the dossier on 13 February 1990 as did the members of the CCS on 19 June. Pope John Paul II declared that she had lived a life of heroic virtue and proclaimed her Venerable on 10 July 1990. A miracle was investigated and the process was ratified on 12 April 1991. Medical experts approved this miracle on 25 February 1993 as did theologians on 2 July and the CCS on 16 November. John Paul II approved it on 23 December 1993 and beatified her on 29 October 1995 in Saint Peter's Basilica. The miracle that led to her beatification was the cure of Bernard Pochon in 1940.

A second miracle was investigated and the process closed on 27 May 2014; this was the 1998 case of a girl who survived a tractor accident after her grandfather invoked the intercession of Bays. The documents in the case were submitted to Rome. The CCS issued a decree that validated this medical investigation on 1 October 2015. The medical experts in Rome approved it on 15 May 2018 as did theologians and the CCS members. Pope Francis gave his assent to the miracle on 15 January 2019.

She was canonized alongside Mariam Thresia Chiramel, John Henry Newman, Dulce de Souza Lopes Pontes and Giuditta Vannini at St Peter's Basilica on 13 October 2019.
