= Brothers of the Poor of St. Francis. =

Brothers of the Poor of Saint Francis
- Congregatio Fratrum Pauperum Sancti Francisci Seraphici
- Abbreviation: C.F.P.
- Formation: December 24, 1857; 168 years ago
- Founder: Br. John Höver (Philip Martin), C.F.P.
- Type: Lay Religious Congregation of Pontifical Right (for Men)
- Headquarters: 3405 190th St., Wever, Iowa, USA
- Members: 37 members (includes 6 priests) as of 2019
- Superior General: Br. Lukas Jünemann, C.F.P.

The Poor Brothers of the Seraphic St. Francis (Latin: Congregatio Fratrum Pauperum Sancti Francisci Seraphici), abbreviated C.F.P. are a Catholic lay religious congregation of Pontifical Right for men (Religious Brothers) of the Third Order Regular of St. Francis, instituted for charitable work among orphan boys and for youth education. They commonly also use the title of Brothers of the Poor of St. Francis.

== Foundation ==
The founder Johannes Höver (Hoever) was born in 1816 into a hard-working farm family in the hill country of Neuhonrath, now part of the town of Lohmar, Germany, near the city of Cologne. Although his help was needed on the farm, the local parish priest saw potential in the young Höver and encouraged his eagerness to learn. This encouragement led in time to his becoming a successful schoolteacher.

Höver became a schoolmaster at Breidt and Aachen, during which time he met and married Anna Maria Katherine Zimmerman. They had two sons, but soon after the birth of their children, Anna Maria became ill and died. To forget the grief he felt at this loss, Höver became involved in the charitable organization of the Society of St. Vincent de Paul. He also became a member of the Third Order of St. Francis, the local fraternity which had a long history of commitment to the poor. Through his service in both organizations, he became aware of the terrible situation of poor and homeless boys in the cities of Germany at the height of the Industrial Revolution.

Blessed Franziska Schervier, foundress of the Poor Sisters of St. Francis, supported him in founding a fraternal order. He was led to dedicate his life to the service of the many poor around him. Thus, on Christmas Eve 1857, he and four other tertiaries dedicated themselves to the service of God and of abandoned men, while living in community under religious vows. At that time, Höver took the religious name of "Brother John" by which he is now known, and was appointed the first Superior General of the new congregation.

The Brothers obtained a home in Aachen in 1860, where they began their work of service to the poor and homeless men of the city. On 5 January of the following year, Cardinal Geissel, the Archbishop of Cologne, approved the new congregation. Within a few years, though, the pressures of leading the community and the demands of teaching, plus caring for his sons, led to the deterioration of Brother John's health. Feeling his end approaching, he appointed Brother Bonaventure Schäben as the new Superior General. When Höver died on 13 July 1864, the community had twenty-six members and some postulants.

== Expansion ==
Under the leadership of Brother John, and under the watchful eye and guidance of the diocesan clergy, to whom they were subject, the young Congregation grew rapidly and spread from its cradle in Aachen to other parts of Germany. In 1866 the Congregation spread to the United States, where orphanages for boys were established in Teutopolis, Illinois; Detroit, Michigan; Cincinnati, Ohio (1868) and Cold Spring, Kentucky (1869), through a donation by Sarah Worthington Peter.

In 1869 the Congregation also received the charge of a Catholic orphanage in Moabit, near Berlin. During the Austro-Prussian war in 1866, and in the Franco-Prussian war, 1870–71, the Poor Brothers helped in the field hospitals. However, the policy of Kulturkampf by the German government led to the loss of all their houses in Prussia during 1876–77. They then moved to Bleijerheide on the German-Dutch border, where the new motherhouse was erected.

After 1888 the Brothers were allowed to return to Prussia and entirely new houses were founded: Hohenhof in Upper Silesia (1891); Dormagen on the Rhine (1902), Düsseldorf (1932), etc. At the last location, they currently run a senior housing complex for 189 residents, and various social services and a trade school. Foundations were also made in Belgium at Völkerich (1900) and in the Netherlands at Roermond (1903).

The Constitution of the Congregation was approved by Pope Pius X in 1910. With that, they became a congregation of Pontifical (international) right, generally free to conduct their affairs without the supervision of local bishops.

In 1921 the American Brothers began to work in Arkansas, where they established several institutions over the next fifteen years. They also expanded to Iowa, New Jersey, Ohio, Texas and South Dakota, mostly in the field of youth work. In 1986, they purchased the Woodlands Treatment Center, a facility for drug and alcohol dependent youth in Burlington, Iowa.

By 1998, through the steady retirement and departure of members, total membership of the American province sank to 24 professed members dispersed across several assignments at schools, prisons and hospitals. The Morris School for Boys, established in 1922 near Searcy, Arkansas, continues to be the brothers' primary ministry. The order's motherhouse remains in Aachen and the order maintains houses in Brazil, Holland and the United States.

== Sources ==
- Der selige Br. Johannes Höver und seine Stiftung (Aachen, 1896);
- Max Heimbucher, Die Orden und Kongregationen, II (Paderborn, 1907), s. v. Armen-Brüder des hl. Franziskus.
