= Giovanni Saziari =

Blessed Giovanni Saziari OFS
- Born: 1327; Cagli, Pesaro-Urbino, Papal States
- Died: 21 April 1371 (aged 44); Cagli, Pesaro-Urbino, Papal States
- Venerated in: Roman Catholic Church
- Beatified: 9 December 1980, Saint Peter's Basilica, Vatican City by Pope John Paul II
- Feast: 21 April

Giovanni Saziari, also known as John Saziari or Joannes Saziari (1327 - 21 April 1371) was an Italian Roman Catholic farmer from the Province of Pesaro and Urbino. He was a member of the Secular Franciscan Order. Saziari was noted in his lifetime for his healing gifts and was known for remaining celibate and childless though married.

Saziari's beatification received confirmation from Pope John Paul II on 9 December 1980 after his 'cultus' (or popular following and devotion) was approved. His feast is on 21 April, the date of his death.

== Life ==
Giovanni Saziari was born in Cagli in 1327 to peasants. Saziari owned a small piece of land and tilled the land as a farmer and was known for his simple and austere life. Saziari became renowned as a healer and there were numerous cases of people with fever who came to him during a time of plague that were healed; an official in Imola in 1374 after Saziari's death that recorded these purported miracles. Saziari was described as being shorter than the average.

He died on 21 April 1371 and his remains were interred in a wooden urn at the altar of Madonna delle Neve in the church of San Francesco in Cagli. His remains were moved in 1642 after the previous altar he was interred in was demolished so taken to Madonna delle Neve.

== Beatification ==
He was beatified on 9 December 1980 by Pope John Paul II. An old document from 1441 had confirmed longstanding and popular veneration.
