= Teresa Manganiello =

Italian member of the Secular Franciscan Order

Blessed Teresa Manganiello OFS
- Born: 1 January 1849; Montefusco, Avellino, Kingdom of the Two Sicilies
- Died: 4 November 1876 (aged 27); Montefusco, Avellino, Kingdom of Italy
- Venerated in: Roman Catholic Church
- Beatified: 22 May 2010, Benevento, Italy by Cardinal Angelo Amato
- Feast: 4 November

Teresa Manganiello (1 January 1849 – 4 November 1876) was an Italian who became a member of the Secular Franciscan Order. She desired to establish a new religious congregation, but died before the idea could come to fruition.

She was beatified in 2010 in Benevento after a miracle was found to have been attributed to her intercession, and the cause still continues.

== Biography ==
Teresa Manganiello was born in 1849 to farmers in Montefusco.

She was drawn to religious life and later became a member of the Secular Franciscan Order in 1871 as she was drawn to the life of Francis of Assisi. Pope Pius IX received her in a private audience in 1873 and blessed her for her mission, which was to establish a new religious congregation.

Manganiello died of a sudden illness in late 1876 before she could accomplish this task, but her work soon led to the establishment of the Franciscan Immaculate Sisters, which Father Ludovico Acernese founded. She is considered to be the spiritual cornerstone of this congregation.

== Beatification ==
The cause for beatification commenced on 23 April 1991 with the declaration of "nihil obstat" under Pope John Paul II, which granted her the title of Servant of God. The process started on a diocesan level in 1991, with the validation of the process in 1992. The Positio was submitted to the Congregation for the Causes of Saints in 1999, which culminated with the declaration of her life of heroic virtue on 3 July 2009. This allowed Pope Benedict XVI to declare her Venerable.

A miracle attributed to her intercession was investigated in 2002, with the validation of that process concluded in 2003. Benedict XVI signed the decree for the miracle on 19 December 2009, which allowed for her beatification. Cardinal Angelo Amato - on behalf of the pope - beatified her on 22 May 2010.
