= Giovanni Pelingotto =

Blessed Giovanni Pelingotto OFS
- Born: 1240; Urbino, Papal States
- Died: 1 June 1304 (aged 64); Urbino, Papal States
- Venerated in: Roman Catholic Church
- Beatified: 13 November 1918, Saint Peter's Basilica, Kingdom of Italy by Pope Benedict XV
- Feast: 1 June

Giovanni Pelingotto (1240 – 1 June 1304) was an Italian Roman Catholic member of the Secular Franciscan Order who hailed from Urbino and lived his life as an almsgiver and hermit. Pelingotto served in his father's business before he quit and provided as much alms as he could provide to the less fortunate in his area. This led him into contact with the Franciscans which served to open him to a greater plane of servitude to God and the poor.

Pelingotto was beatified on 13 November 1918 when Pope Benedict XV confirmed the late Franciscan's local 'cultus' (or popular devotion).

== Life ==
Giovanni Pelingotto was born in Urbino in 1240 to a rich merchant.

Pelingotto began to work in his father's business in 1252 and cared nothing for business like his father did and nor did he care about worldliness of wealth. Instead he preferred to live life as a hermit and he felt called to help the less fortunate in the world so gave to the poor food and clothes as well as other aspects of his wealth. Business efforts were not directed to his own fortune or for profit but for the sustenance and benefit of other people. He lived in rags and wore a rope around his neck to indicate that he was a sinner in need of punishment. His parents worried about his health and had to bring him in from the streets.

He became a professed member of the Secular Franciscan Order at the church of Santa Maria degli Angeli and became able to devote his life to greater charitable works with their support and discipline. He travelled to Rome in 1300 for the Jubilee that Pope Boniface VIII convoked. Though he had never been to Rome before the people there were well aware of him.

Pelingotto died on 1 June 1304. He was interred at the San Francesco convent in Urbino where numerous miracles were later reported to have occurred. He was later re-interred within that convent itself.

== Beatification ==
The confirmation of Pelingotto's local 'cultus' (or popular devotion) on 13 November 1918 allowed for Pope Benedict XV to approve his beatification.
