= C.T. Hayden House =

United States historic place in Tempe, Arizona

- U.S. National Register of Historic Places
- Location within Arizona Location within the United States
- Location: 3 W. 1st Street, Tempe, Arizona
- Coordinates: 33.42927°N 111.94041°W
- Built: 1873; 1925; 2000
- NRHP reference No.: 84000173
- Added to NRHP: 1984

The C.T. Hayden House, also known as "La Casa Vieja" or "The Old House", is a historic building and landmark in Tempe, Arizona, and is the oldest occupied structure in the Salt River Valley (more commonly, The Valley of the Sun). Built in 1873, the home originally belonged to Charles Trumbull Hayden, who founded the city of Tempe. It is located at 100 S. Mill Ave, Tempe, and was the birthplace of Carl Hayden.

== History ==
=== Hayden Family Home (1874–1889 ) ===
C.T. Hayden House was the residence of Charles T. Hayden following a relocation from Tucson. The home started out as a 13-room Mexican adobe style structure and saw an addition of two rooms by 1876. It was later renovated to add an additional six rooms to the main floor and a two-room second story. After the family moved out in 1889, the home was used as a boarding house until 1924.

=== La Casa Vieja (1924–2014) ===
In 1924, the house was renovated and repurposed as a restaurant. Crews tore down the second story and preserved and restored its adobe-style features. It was initially owned by Sallie and Mary Hayden, until they sold it in 1930. Ownership of the house passed through several hands until it was bought by Leonard Monti in 1954. Monti owned the restaurant, rebranded as Monti's La Casa Vieja, until it shuttered its doors in 2014.

=== Hayden House (2020) ===
As of summer 2020, the Hayden House has nearly been rehabilitated to its 1924-era state by Hensel Phelps as a condition of further development on the site (see 100 Mill). The city of Tempe will then acquire the Hayden House for $10. This marks the first time that the City will retain ownership of the site.
