= St. Joseph's Medical Center (Yonkers, New York) =

Coordinates: 40°55′46″N 73°53′52″W

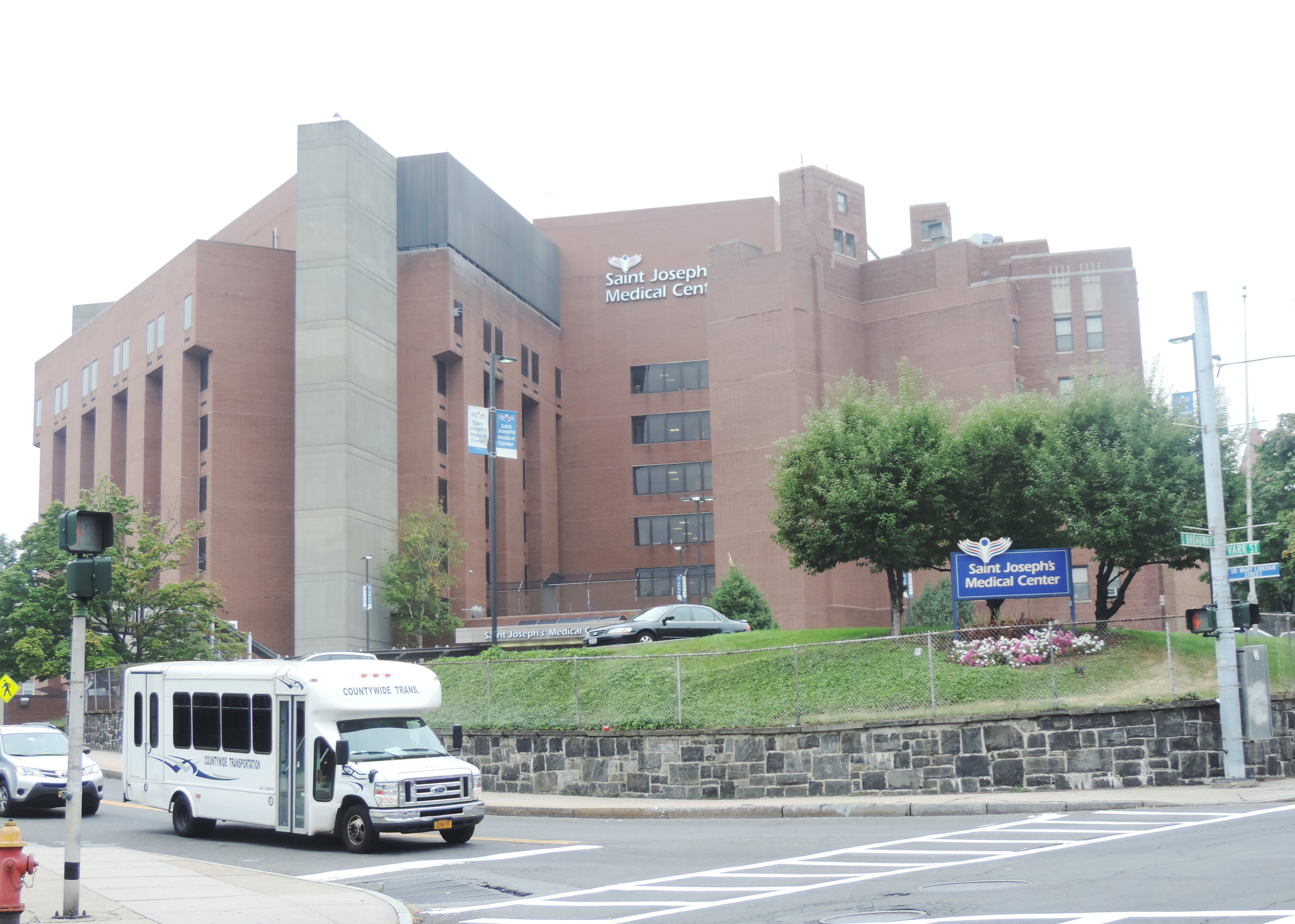

Geography
- Location: 127 S. Broadway, Yonkers, New York, United States

Organization
- Affiliated university: New York Medical College

Services
- Beds: 532

History
- Founded: 1888

Links
- Website: www.saintjosephs.org
- Lists: Hospitals in New York State

St. Joseph's Medical Center is one of the largest medical facilities in Westchester County of New York. The system includes a 194-bed teaching hospital, a 200-bed nursing home, two affordable senior housing facilities for frail elderly residents, a family medicine residency program, a podiatric surgery residency program, state-of-the-art technology, a 138-bed psychiatric hospital (St. Vincent's Hospital Westchester in Harrison) and satellite clinics in Yonkers, White Plains, Port Chester, Brooklyn, Queens and Staten Island.

== History ==
It was founded in 1888 as St. Joseph's Hospital by the Sisters of Charity of New York. Thomas Cornell was active in the establishment of the hospital.

In 1976, the hospital opened the St. Joseph's Hospital Nursing Home/Sister Mary Linehan Pavilion to provide nursing care to the elderly. In 2010, it assumed responsibility for St. Vincent's Hospital Westchester, when that institution's parent, the famed St. Vincent's Hospital of Manhattan, closed.

== Hospital rating data ==
The HealthGrades website contains the latest quality data for St. Joseph Medical Center (of Yonkers), as of 2015. For this rating section three different types of data from HealthGrades are presented: quality ratings for seventeen inpatient conditions and procedures, thirteen patient safety indicators, percentage of patients giving the hospital a 9 or 10 (the two highest possible ratings).

For inpatient conditions and procedures, there are three possible ratings: worse than expected, as expected, better than expected. For this hospital the data for this category is:

- Worse than expected - 8
- As expected - 9
- Better than expected - 0

For patient safety indicators, there are the same three possible ratings. For this hospital safety indicators were rated as:

- Worse than expected - 4
- As expected -8
- Better than expected - 0

Data for patients giving this hospital a 9 or 10 are:

- Patients rating this hospital as a 9 or 10 - 53%
- Patients rating hospitals as a 9 or 10 nationally - 69%
