= Terry-Hayden House =

Historic house in Connecticut, United States

- U.S. National Register of Historic Places
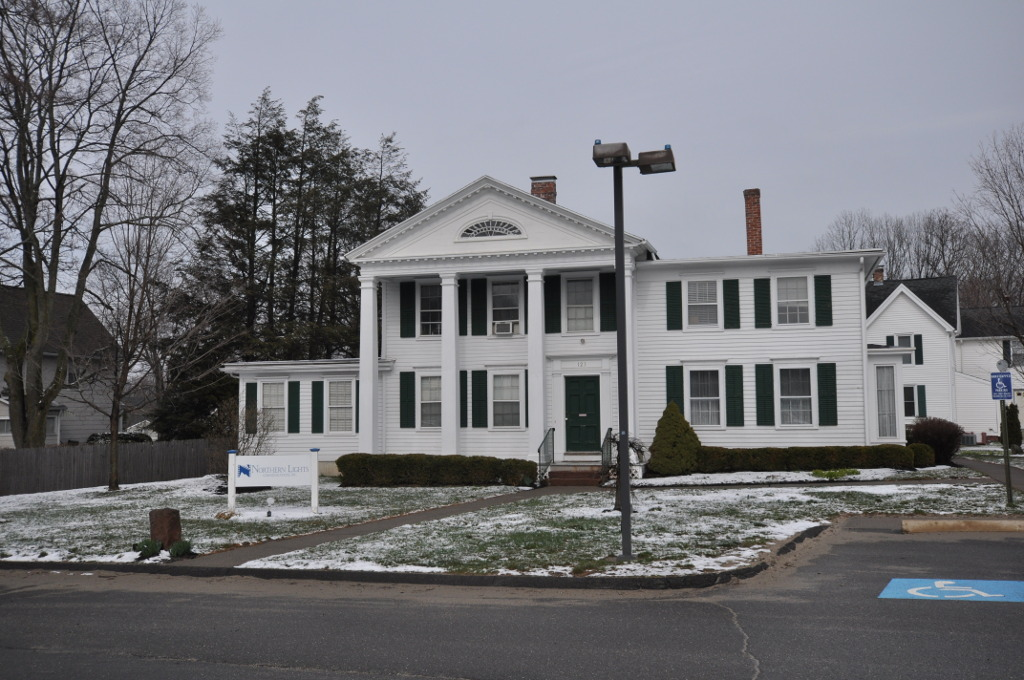

- Location within Connecticut Location within the United States
- Location: 125-135 Middle Street, Bristol, Connecticut
- Coordinates: 41°39′57″N 72°55′17″W
- Area: 2.5 acres (1.0 ha)
- Built: 1831
- Architectural style: Greek Revival
- NRHP reference No.: 82004393
- Added to NRHP: March 25, 1982

The Terry-Hayden House is a historic house at 125-135 Middle Street in Bristol, Connecticut. Built in 1835 and enlarged in 1884, it is a well-preserved example of a Greek Revival house with a four-column temple portico. Now part of a professional office complex called Terry Commons, it was listed on the National Register of Historic Places in 1982.

== Description and history ==
The Terry-Hayden House is located east of downtown Bristol, on the east side of Middle Street (Connecticut Route 229), just south of its junction with Pine Street. It is set well back from the road, separated from it by open space and the parking lot of the accompanying modern profession office complex. It is a 2 1/2-story wood-frame structure, with a gabled roof and mainly clapboarded exterior. It is composed of several different sections, the most prominent being the three-bay center. It is fronted by a mammoth two-story Greek Revival temple front, with four square Doric columns rising to a full entablature and pedimented gable. The gable cornice is studded with modillions, and it central field is filled with a semi-oval window. Windows are set in rectangular openings with projecting caps, and the main entrance is in the right bay, framed by pilasters and a corniced entablature. To the right of this bay is the 1884 addition, a two-bay frame structure with similar window styling. A more modern two-story ell, also with sympathetic styling, has been to the left side.

The central portion of the house was built in 1831 by Theodore Terry, a nephew of Eli Terry who was like his father and uncle a clockmaker, operating one of the city's largest clock factories. Terry sold the house in 1850 to Henry Mitchell, a lawyer, businessman, and politician. Mitchell made the addition on the right side of the house. In 1899 it was purchased by Leonard Hayden, whose family owned it at least into the early 1980s. The house is a prominent local example of Greek Revival architecture, notable both for its late Federal period features (the semi-oval window), and the sympathetic Italianate addition of Mitchell.

== See also ==
- National Register of Historic Places listings in Hartford County, Connecticut
