= Hayden Rooming House =

- U.S. National Register of Historic Places
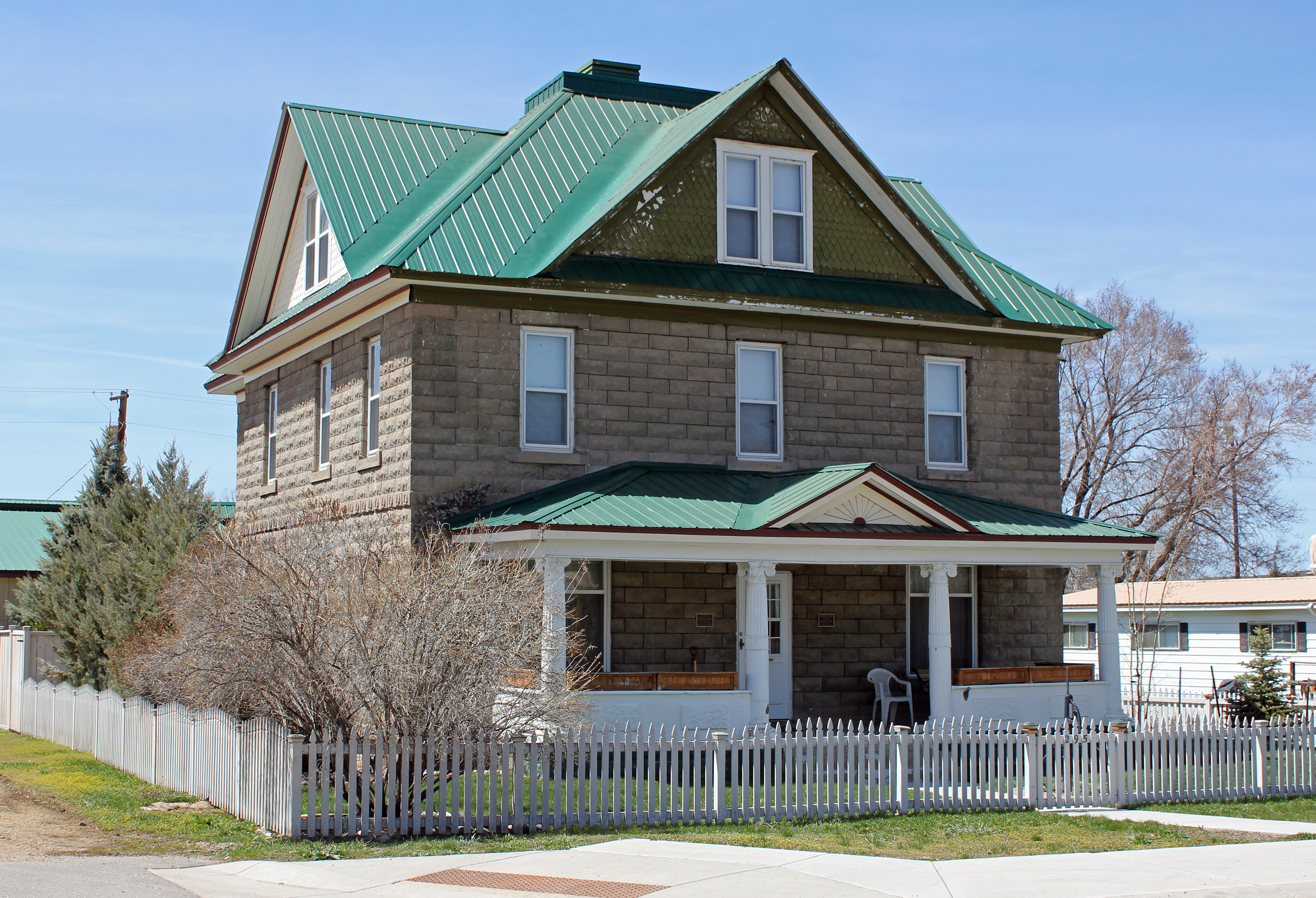

- Location within Colorado
- Location: 295 S. Poplar St., Hayden, Colorado
- Coordinates: 40°29′32″N 107°15′31″W
- Area: less than one acre
- Built: 1910
- Built by: Hofstetter, Peter J.
- MPS: Ornamental Concrete Block Buildings in Colorado MPS
- NRHP reference No.: 99001144
- Added to NRHP: September 17, 1999

The Hayden Rooming House, also known as the Hayden Inn, at 295 S. Poplar St. in Hayden, Colorado, was built in 1910. It was listed on the National Register of Historic Places in 1999.

It is significant for its association with early commercial development in Hayden.
