= Good Samaritan Hospital (Suffern) =

Geography
- Location: Suffern, New York, U.S.
- Coordinates: 41°6′42″N 74°8′7″W

Services
- Beds: 286

History
- Opened: 1902

Links
- Lists: Hospitals in U.S.

Good Samaritan Hospital is a non-profit, 286-bed hospital in Suffern, New York. It provides emergency, medical, surgical, obstetrical, gynecological, and acute care services.

The hospital is home to a cardiovascular program, cancer treatment services, wound and hyperbaric institute and maternal/child services that includes a children's diagnostic center. Good Samaritan Hospital also provides social, psychiatric and substance abuse services and its certified home care agency supports residents of the Hudson Valley and beyond. Good Samaritan Hospital is a member of the Bon Secours Charity Health System, which also includes St. Anthony Community Hospital in Warwick, New York, and Bon Secours Community Hospital in Port Jervis, New York.

Bon Secours Charity Health System has subsequently become part of the WMCHealth. The hospital currently has a staff of more than 600 doctors and 2,000 employees. Its academic affiliate is the New York Medical College School of Medicine.

== History ==
=== 20th century ===
In 1902, Good Samaritan Hospital opened with seven beds, three doctors, seven nurses and four Sisters of Charity, more than enough to serve Suffern, New York's population of 1,800 and small business district consisting of: four hotels, three churches, one school, a lumberyard, an opera house, and an assortment of small stores.

A private citizen, said to be Ida Barry Ryan, donated a building at Orange Avenue and East Park Place and $25,000 to the Sisters of Charity of St. Elizabeth to create a hospital. In its first year, the hospital treated 162 patients and was soon forced to expand. Over the next decade, the hospital added an operating room, a pharmacy, and X-ray departments. By 1917, the hospital had 35 beds, nine physicians and three specialists. Maternity services had been available at the hospital from the beginning, but the Spring Valley branch of the Ladies Auxiliary funded the furnishings and equipment for a nursery in 1926 and a maternity ward in 1927.

By 1929, a population increase created an urgent need to build a larger hospital. A committee raised $93,000 and, in 1932, bought 25 acres (100,000 m^{2}) on Lafayette Avenue, the current site of the hospital, for $22,500. The new 72-bed hospital opened on December 14, 1938, and was the first hospital in Rockland County, New York, to be approved by both the American Medical Association and the American College of Surgeons.

In 1939, the hospital won an award as the best-equipped Catholic hospital in the United States and Canada.

When the Tappan Zee Bridge opened in 1955, it brought a large number of new residents to the region and in 1959, Good Samaritan Hospital responded to the need for medical care with the Cardinal Spellman Pavilion, named for Francis Spellman, the sixth Archbishop of New York.

In 1962, the hospital launched its home care program, which has grown into one of the largest home care programs in New York state.

In 1970, the new Sister Miriam Thomas Pavilion, a five-story, $7 million health facility, was opened, with two 35-bed medical and surgical floors, a maternal and newborn care center, a laboratory, radiology, a nuclear medicine and cobalt center, and a recovery room. The Monsignor Patrick J. Frawley Memorial Psychiatric Unit also opened.

The St. Elizabeth Ann Seton Critical Care Center was completed in 1980, and the Frank and Fannie Weiss Renal Dialysis Center was opened in 1982. An $85 million building and renovation project included the construction of a cardiac catheterization laboratory and expansion of the radiology, laboratory and rehab services departments.

In the late 1980s and early 1990s, the hospital added a 28-bed chemical and alcohol dependency outpatient program, a children's diagnostic center, single-room maternity units and a neonatal intermediate care nursery (NICU-level), and brachytherapy in radiation oncology services.

In 1996, Good Samaritan Hospital and its sponsors, the Sisters of Charity of St. Elizabeth, joined the Franciscan Sisters of the Poor, the Sisters of Mercy and the Franciscan Health System to form the Tri-State Health System. The Emergency Department earned a Level II trauma services designation in 1997.

In fall 1996, the hospital unveiled the Union State Bank Family Birthing Center and added a full-time maternity consultant.

=== 21st century ===
In January 2000, Good Samaritan Hospital and the Sisters of Charity entered into a co-sponsorship with the Sisters of Bon Secours, creating Bon Secours Charity Health System.

In 2003, the hospital was approved to begin performing angioplasties.

In 2005, the first major step in remedying this situation was taken when the New York State Hospital Review and Planning Council recommended granting approval of Good Samaritan Hospital's Certificate of Need (CON) application for an adult cardiac surgery program.

Also in 2005, Good Samaritan Hospital became the first hospital in the nation to earn Disease Specific Care Certification for the management of acute myocardial infarction. The Stroke Center at Good Samaritan Regional Medical Center is also recognized as a Primary Stroke Center by the New York State Department of Health. Good Samaritan Hospital was the first hospital in New York state to earn both Joint Commission Primary Stroke Center certification and a state designation as a Primary Stroke Center.

In 2007, the hospital performed its first open heart surgery, which marked the opening of The Active International Cardiovascular Institute at Good Samaritan, the only comprehensive cardiac surgery program in New York state west of the Hudson River between the New Jersey border in the south and Albany in the north, which spans over 100 miles (160 km).

The month before, the hospital was again recognized with the Gold Seal of Approval for both the management of acute myocardial infarction (heart attack) and management of stroke from the Joint Commission.
