= Bartolo da San Gimignano =

Italian Roman Catholic priest (1228–1300)

Blessed Bartolo da San Gimignano TOSF
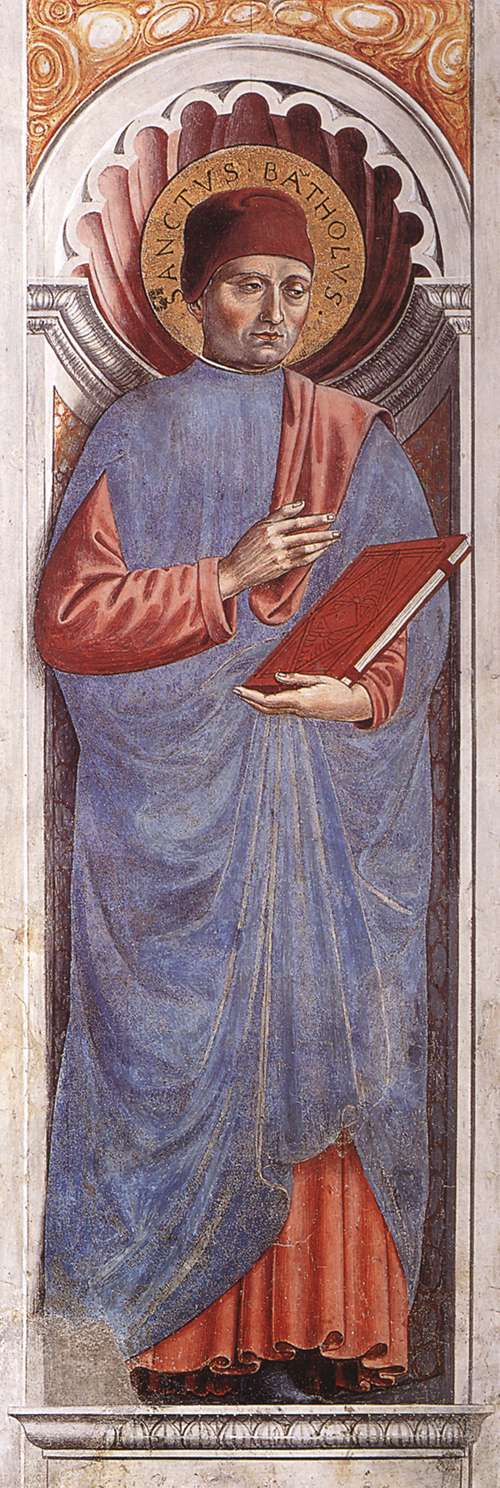
- Born: 1228; San Gimignano, Siena, Republic of Siena
- Died: 12 December 1300 (aged 72); San Gimignano, Siena, Republic of Siena
- Venerated in: Roman Catholic Church
- Beatified: 27 April 1910, Saint Peter's Basilica, Kingdom of Italy by Pope Pius X
- Feast: 12 December

Bartolo da San Gimignano (born Bartolo Buonpedoni; 1228 – 12 December 1300) was an Italian Roman Catholic priest and a member of the Third Order of Saint Francis. Bartolo was born to nobles near Siena and fled home to become a priest to escape his father's wrath. He tended to poor people in the streets and used his income to provide alms to them and to alleviate their suffering while himself contracting a disease from working with the poor and succumbing to that same disease as a result.

His beatification received approval from Pope Pius X on 27 April 1910.

== Life ==
Bartolo Buonpedoni was born in 1228 in San Gimignano – near Siena – as the last descendant from the noble house of the counts of Mucchio to Giovanni Buonpedoni and Giuntina. For two decades his childless mother begged God to give her a son and invoked the intercession of Saint Peter who appeared to her in a dream assuring her that she would soon have a son.

In his adolescence he felt called to become a priest despite the fact that his vain and proud father preferred that Bartolo instead become a knight and that he wed in order to continue the noble line. But his father became infuriated with Bartolo's inner desire and used all available means to break his son's resolve in a move that soon prompted Bartolo to flee his father's wrath and seek refuge with the Order of Saint Benedict at their convent of San Vito in Pisa. It was in that place that he worked in their infirmaries. The superiors there soon saw his eminent virtues and decided to offer him the habit and a place in their convent. But one night he had a vision in which Jesus Christ, with a scourge in his hand, said to him: "Bartolo, not in this habit are you to attain the celestial crown; it is to be through suffering and wounds, and in the garb of penance".

Around 1280 he contracted leprosy and resigned all of his parochial duties as a result while withdrawing to a leper hospital near his hometown of San Gimignano where he would spend the remainder of his life..

One week before his death he said he had a vision in which Jesus Christ came to him and told him that he would soon die. He died from the disease on 12 December 1300 and his remains were interred in the church of Saint Augustine in San Gimignano. After his death a maid who tended to him before he died knelt before his open casket and wept. It was said that one hand of the dead priest reached for hers and clasped it for five hours to comfort her. Benedetto da Majano designed his tomb.

== Beatification ==
The beatification process received papal approval from Pope Pius X on 27 April 1910 after his popular local cultus was confirmed.
