= Franciscan Sisters of the Poor =

The Franciscan Sisters of the Poor (Latin: Sorores Franciscanae Pauperorum, abbreviated to S.F.P.) are a religious congregation which was established in 1959 as an independent branch from the Congregation of the Poor Sisters of St. Francis, founded in Germany by Blessed Frances Schervier in 1845.

In 1959, the American province of the Congregation separated from the German Motherhouse to become an independent Congregation under its current name. They have their headquarters in Brooklyn, New York.

== Foundations ==
Mary Frances Schervier along with four companions, all members of the Third Order of St. Francis, moved into a common residence in the city of Aachen, Germany in 1845. They formed this community in response to a desire to help alleviate the desperate conditions of the poor in their region in that period.

From 1845 until 1848, the sisters cared for the sick in their homes and operated a soup kitchen. They also cared for prostitutes in their own small convent and nursed women suffering from syphilis. Relying entirely upon donations for support, the Sisters experienced extreme poverty. The potato and grain failures which occurred during that period and the refusal of some benefactors to continue their assistance once the Sisters began ministering to prostitutes intensified their difficulties. More women joined the group in 1849, expanding the ministry beyond Aachen.

The community was formally established as a religious congregation of the Franciscan Third Order Regular by the Archbishop of Cologne on 2 July 1851, and Mother Mary Frances was elected as Superior General. This took place despite objections by Church authorities to the foundress' severe position regarding personal poverty.

== The Sisters come to the United States ==
Soon after this legal recognition, the Sisters spread their service overseas. An American foundation was established within seven years of its founding, to serve German emigrant communities in New York, New Jersey and Ohio. At the same time, as their Superior General, Mother Frances oversaw the foundation of several hospitals and sanatoria in both Europe and the United States for those suffering from tuberculosis, then a widespread cause of death, especially among the working classes.

Over the next fifty years, hospitals were established in several states. They founded various community hospitals around the nation, including St. Anthony Community Hospital in Warwick, New York (now operated by the Bon Secours Charity Health System), and the former St. Mary Hospital in Hoboken, New Jersey (now Hoboken University Medical Center). In New York City, the Sisters opened and staffed St. Francis Hospital (1865-1966), St. Joseph Hospital for Chest Diseases (1888-1962) and the Frances Schervier Home and Hospital, all located in the Borough of the Bronx.

The sisters, at the invitation of the Bishop of Covington and lay benefactors, opened St. Elizabeth Hospital in Covington, KY (1861). St. Elizabeth Hospital currently has six locations, and is one of the largest employers of the Northern Kentucky metro area.

Mother Frances visited the United States in 1863, and helped her Sisters nurse soldiers wounded in the American Civil War. St. Mary Hospital in Hoboken, N.J. was founded for this work. She visited the United States one more time in 1868, and attended the dedication of the new location for St. Elizabeth Hospital in Covington, KY. When Mother Frances died in 1876, there were 2,500 members of the congregation worldwide.

== A new congregation ==
Because the number of houses, in America, as well as elsewhere, grew rapidly, certain difficulties arose in the field of government and mutual concord. During the period of the World Wars, when the houses abroad were for so long a time cut off from the Motherhouse in Germany, these problems became more acute. In 1959 the American branch was separated from the Poor Sisters of St. Francis to form the Franciscan Sisters of the Poor.

The number kept growing until the 1970s, when, like many other religious orders, they began to experience a sharp decline in membership. In response to the request of both the European and American Congregations, and the research they provided regarding her life to the Holy See, Mother Frances was beatified in 1974 by Pope Paul VI.

Since the 1990s, the Congregation has transferred the ownership of many of their institutions to other organizations, and at present focuses on health care, pastoral ministry and social services. The Sisters operate daycare centers and schools, shelters, soup kitchens, healthcare clinics and maternity programs and a senior residence facility. Currently, the Congregation has communities of Sisters serving in the United States, Brazil, Italy and Senegal.

== See also ==
- Poor Sisters of St. Francis

== Sources ==
- Jeiler, P. I. (1924). The Venerable Mother Frances Schervier, Foundress of the Congregation of the Sisters of the Poor of Saint Francis: a Sketch of her Life and Character. Translated by Bonaventura Hammer. St. Louis, Missouri: B. Herder.
- "Our History". Franciscan Sisters of the Poor. Archived from the original on 10 September 2004.
