= William Hayden House (Albany, Vermont) =

Historic house in Vermont, United States

- U.S. National Register of Historic Places
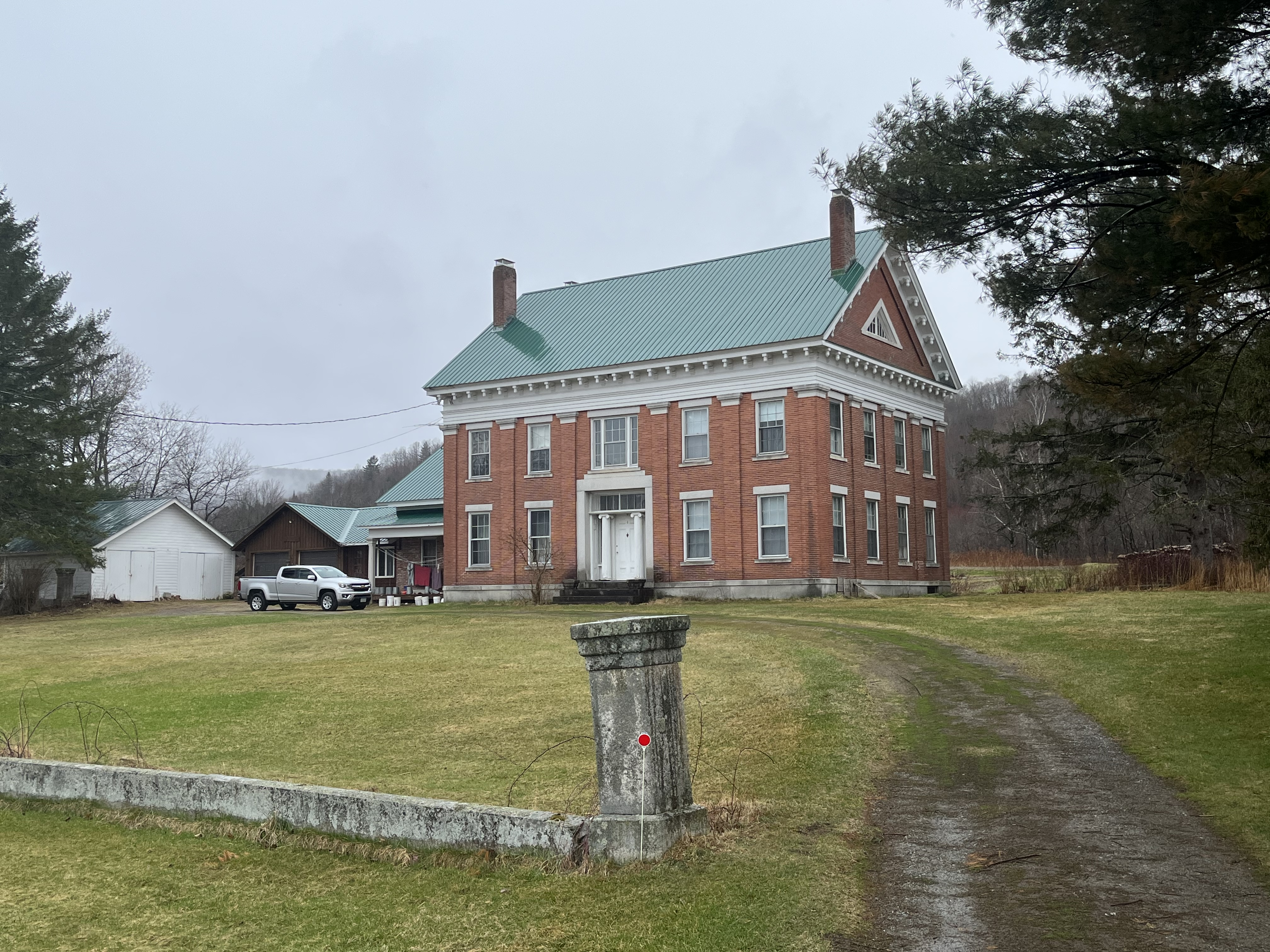

- Location within Vermont Location within the United States
- Location: VT 14; Albany, Vermont
- Coordinates: 44°42′36″N 72°23′26″W
- Area: 7 acres (2.8 ha)
- Built: 1854
- Built by: William Steele
- Architectural style: Greek Revival
- NRHP reference No.: 78000238
- Added to NRHP: January 31, 1978

The William Hayden House is a historic house on Vermont Route 14 in southern Albany, Vermont. Built in 1854, it is a remarkably sophisticated example of Greek Revival architecture in brick for a small rural community. It was listed on the National Register of Historic Places in 1978.

== Description and history ==
The William Hayden House stands on the west side of Vermont Route 14, between Wylie Hill Road and Route 14's crossing of the Rogers Branch of the Black River. It is a 2 1/2-story brick building, with a side gable roof, end chimneys, and granite foundation. It is set back from the road, accessed by a semicircular drive, with a low granite wall paralleling the road. The driveway entrances are marked by carved stone posts, as is a pedestrian entrance at the center of the semicircle. The house's main block has a five-bay front facade, articulated by brick pilasters with granite capitals. Windows are rectangular sash, set in openings with granite sills and lintels. The window above the entrance is a three-section window, with narrow side windows in the Palladian style. The entrance is recessed in a rectangular granite-lined openings, with flanking sidelight windows and round columns, and a large transom window above. Below the roofline is a tall entablature, and an eave decorated with drop pendants. A single-story brick ell, reproducing one destroyed by fire, extends to the south, joining the house to a 20th-century garage.

William Hayden is said to have built the first frame house in what is now Albany, and it is where he raised a son, William, Jr., who went on to become a railroad construction magnate. In 1854 he had this house built by a local contractor, William Steele, using locally sourced bricks. Local lore has it that he had it built as a monument to himself, and "to show the fools in Albany what money could do". His only son's heirs squabbled over his estate, which passed out of the family in 1927. It became rundown in the mid-20th century, but underwent a major restoration in the late 1970s, which included a recreation (based on early photos) of the original ell.

== See also ==
- National Register of Historic Places listings in Orleans County, Vermont
