= William Hayden House (Tecumseh, Michigan) =

Historic house in Michigan, United States

- U.S. National Register of Historic Places
- Michigan State Historic Site
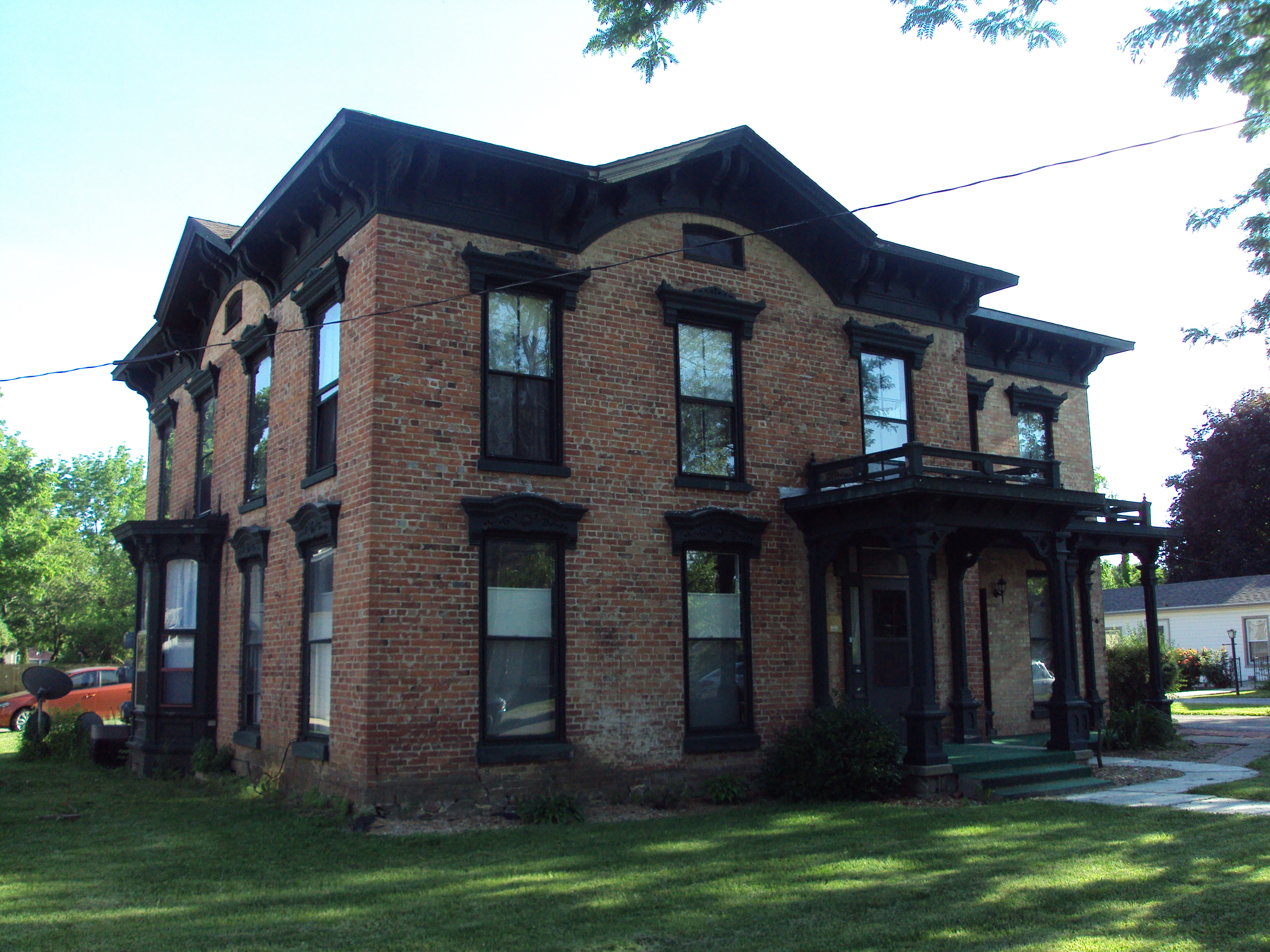

- Location within Michigan Location within the United States
- Interactive map
- Location: 108 W. Pottawatamie Street; Tecumseh, Michigan
- Coordinates: 42°00′09″N 83°56′45″W
- Built: 1860
- Architectural style: Italianate
- MPS: Tecumseh MRA
- NRHP reference No.: 86001568
- Added to NRHP: August 13, 1986

The William Hayden House is a private residence located at 108 West Pottawatamie Street in the city of Tecumseh in northeast Lenawee County, Michigan. It was designated as a Michigan Historic Site and added to the National Register of Historic Places on August 13, 1986.

== History ==
This house is locally important as the former home of William Hayden. William Hayden was born in Otsego County, New York, and in 1851 moved to Jackson, Michigan and purchased a mill there. In 1856, he married Sara M. Hosner, and in 1857 the couple moved to Tecumseh and purchased the Globe Flour Mill. Under Hayden's ownership, the mill became one of Tecumseh's leading commercial businesses in the second half of the nineteenth century. In 1860, Hayden constructed this house. In 1882 Hayden purchased a factory to manufacture his own barrels. William Hayden died in 1897.

== Description ==
The house is a two-story, red brick villa built in Italianate architecture. While his house was typical of other houses in the area at the time, the Hayden House is recognized for its elaborate detailing. It has a cubical main section, and a slightly recessed wing extending to the side. Both sections have low pitched hip roofs, with widely projecting eaves supported by brackets. The main facade is five bays wide with one- and two-over-two windows having arched and winged caps. The front porch is a large bracketed stoop, and a smaller porch extends to one west side.
