= Poor Sisters of St. Francis =

Religious congregation for women founded in 1845

The Poor Sisters of St. Francis (Latin: Sorores Pauperae sancti Francisci, abbreviated as S.P.S.F.) (German: Armen-Schwestern vom heiligen Franziskus), also known as the Aachener Franziskanerinnen, are a religious congregation founded by the Blessed Mary Frances Schervier in 1845 in Germany (from the name of their foundress sometimes known as the Schervier Sisters). Their distinguishing emblem is a red cross with the Instruments of the Passion on it, which was originally embroidered on the scapular of their religious habits.

== Foundation ==
Schervier, the daughter of a physician in the city of Aachen—then in the Kingdom of Prussia, who had lost her mother in her infancy, became drawn to care for the poor of the city as she grew into adulthood. A faithful Catholic, she became a member of the Third Order of St. Francis, which provided an outlet for this interest. After serving in this field for several years, in 1845 she formed a small community with four companions, all drawn from the tertiary Franciscan fraternity of the city. They formed this community in response to a desire to help alleviate the desperate conditions of the poor in their region in that period, which resulted from the economic and political upheavals taking place then.

From 1845 until 1848, the religious sisters cared for the sick in their homes and operated a soup kitchen. They also cared for some of the many prostitutes in a city which was at that time a major spa resort, especially for relief from syphilis. They housed these women in their own small convent and nursed those suffering from that disease. Relying entirely upon donations for support, the Sisters experienced extreme poverty. The potato and grain failures which occurred during that period and the refusal of some benefactors to continue their assistance once the Sisters began ministering to prostitutes intensified their difficulties.

In the latter part of 1848 a mild form of cholera broke out in Aachen, followed by an epidemic of smallpox, and an infirmary was opened in a former Dominican priory, by then the property of the city. The Sisters offered their services as nurses and they were authorized to take up residence in the building to carry out their nursing work. More women joined the group in 1849, expanding the ministry beyond Aachen; not only did they care for victims of cholera, smallpox, typhoid fever, and cancer, but they also supervised women prisoners at the Aachen prison and assisted them in finding employment after their release. In 1850 they established a hospital for incurables in the old Dominican building, and the home nursing and charity kitchens in different parishes were entrusted to them.

The community was formally established as a religious congregation of the Franciscan Third Order Regular by the Archbishop of Cologne on 2 July 1851, and Schervier was elected as Superior General. This took place despite objections by some Church authorities to the foundress' severe position regarding personal poverty. Foundations were established in Ratingen, Mayence, Coblenz (1854); Kaiserswerth, Crefeld, Euskirchen (1855); Eschweiler (1858); Stolberg and Erfurt (1863)

According to the archivist of the Congregation in that period, they received state acceptance in 1853 mainly because "priests and religious persons were considered suitable for pacifying the people who had been roused by revolutionary ideas", and that the tide of government sentiment turned when "through unification of the conservative elements in the state, the Revolution (ed. note: see the Revolutions of 1848) had been overcome".

== Expansion ==
Soon after this legal recognition, the Sisters spread their service overseas. An American foundation was established within seven years of its founding, to serve German emigrant communities in New York, New Jersey and Ohio.

The first Sisters arrived in Cincinnati in 1858. the Sisters of the Good Shepherd gave them hospitality. Soon they received the offer of the use of a vacated orphanage for their patients, and in March 1859 they established St. Mary's Hospital. In 1860 they established a branch-house in Covington, Kentucky. At the same time, as their Superior General, Schervier oversaw the foundation of several hospitals and sanatoria in both Europe and the United States for those suffering from tuberculosis, then a widespread cause of death, especially among the working classes.

When Schervier died in 1876, there were 2,500 members of the congregation worldwide. The number kept growing until the 1970s, when, like many other religious institutes, they began to experience a sharp decline in membership.

In 1959, the American province of the congregation separated from it, to become an independent congregation called the Franciscan Sisters of the Poor. They have their headquarters in Brooklyn, New York. They are still engaged in operating hospitals and homes for the aged, but have transferred the ownership of many of these institutions to other organizations.

In response to the request of both Congregations, and the research they provided regarding her life to the Holy See, Schervier was beatified in 1974 by Pope Paul VI.

== Status ==
Currently, in addition to Germany, this congregation has communities of Sisters serving in Belgium and Denmark. The Superior General of the congregation, as of 15 October 2016, is Sister M. Martha Kruszynski, S.P.S.F., a native of Poland.

== See also ==
- Brothers of the Poor of St. Francis, an associated order for men
- Frances Schervier
- Franciscan Sisters of the Poor

== Further sources ==
- Jeiler, P. I. (1924). The Venerable Mother Frances Schervier, Foundress of the Congregation of the Sisters of the Poor of Saint Francis: A Sketch of Her Life and Character. Translated by Bonaventura Hammer (3rd ed.). St. Louis, Missouri: B. Herder. OCLC 19861628. 1895 edition.
