= Bon Secours Charity Health System =

- Type: Healthcare System
- Location: Suffern, NY; Port Jervis, NY; Warwick, NY
- Region served: New York
- Services: Hospitals, Home Care, Long-term and Short-term Care, Medical Group
- Members: Member of Westchester Medical Center Health Network (WMC Health)
- Affiliations: Bon Secours Ministries, Sisters of Charity of St. Elizabeth

The Bon Secours Charity Health System, part of the Bon Secours Health System, was established from a partnership between the Sisters of Bon Secours and the Sisters of Charity of Saint Elizabeth of Convent Station, New Jersey. The system includes Good Samaritan Regional Medical Center in Suffern, New York, Bon Secours Community Hospital in Port Jervis, New York, and St. Anthony Community Hospital in Warwick, New York.

On May 20, 2015, Westchester Medical Center in Valhalla, New York, announced that it would become the majority corporate member of BSCHS. WMC will actively manage the Bon Secours Charity Hospitals and associated facilities. The combination of BSCHS and existing WMC facilities gives the new network 1,500 inpatient hospital beds, 166 nursing home beds, 2,800 physicians, and a workforce of over 10,000.
