= Mary Frances Schervier =

German Catholic nun

Blessed Frances Schervier TOSF
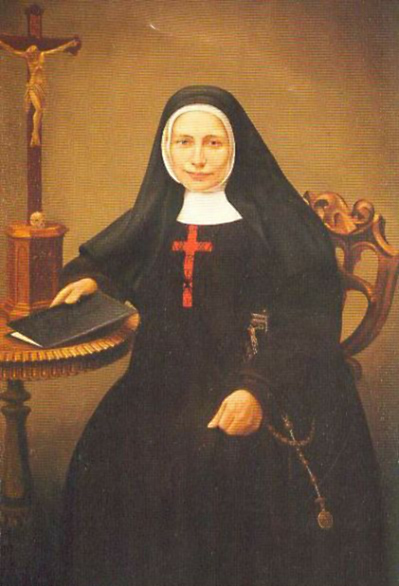

Religious
- Born: Maria Franziska Schervier; 3 January 1819; Aachen, Rhine Province, Kingdom of Prussia
- Died: 14 December 1876 (aged 57); Aachen, German Empire
- Venerated in: Roman Catholic Church
- Beatified: 28 April 1974, Rome, Italy by Pope Paul VI
- Feast: 15 December
- Attributes: Religious habit
- Patronage: Aachen

Mary Frances Schervier, (German: Franziska Schervier; 3 January 1819 – 14 December 1876) was a German Catholic nun who founded the Poor Sisters of St. Francis. Schervier was beatified by Pope Paul VI in 1974.

== Early life ==
Frances Schervier (German: Franziska) was born on 3 January 1819 into a wealthy family in Aachen in the Kingdom of Prussia (present-day Germany). Her German father, Johann Heinrich Schervier, owned a needle factory and was the vice-mayor of Aachen. Her French mother, Maria Louise Migeon, ran a strict home environment.

By her early teens, Schervier wanted to join a religious order. However, Maria Migeon died In 1832 from tuberculosis; her two older daughters died in 1833. Schervier was forced to put aside her plans to run the household. Over the next few years, she developed an awareness of th desperate conditions of the poor and started helping them.

In 1837, some prominent women in Aachen started a society to help the poor; they asked Johann to allow his 19-year-old daughter to join them. Schervier started visiting sick people in their homes to nurse them. She also volunteered at Saint John's Kitchen, a meal center operated by Joseph Istas, the curate at Saint Paul Parish. She was deeply impressed by Istas' dedication to his ministry. Johann was unhappy with Schervier.s activities, fearing that she would introduce infectious diseases into their home. Johann died in 1845.

== er father, Schervier and four friends in 1845 joined the secular branch of Third Order of St. Francis, an group of lay people who followed the teachings of Francis of Assisi.The women moved into a house in Aachen, where they spent their time in religious exercises, household duties, and caring for the sick and poor. The women opened a food kitchen; they also brought female sex workers and women suffering from syphilis into the house. Relying entirely upon donations for support, the women experienced extreme poverty.By 1848, the Aachen branch of the Third order had 13 women as members. ==
In late 1848, Aachen was hit by outbreaks of cholera and smallpox. The women moved into an infirmary that the city had set up to treat these patients. They were asked in 1849 to operate an infirmary for cholera patients in the Burtscheid quarter of Aachen; more women joined their group. By 1850, the women were conducting the home and food kitchens for all the parishes in Aachen, along with a hospice. In June 1950, the women took over operation of a hospital in Juelich in Prussia.

== Poor Sisters of St. Francis ==
=== Prussia ===
In 1850, Schervier and her fellow members of the Third Order decided to form a consecrated religious institute. They submitted a proposed constitution for the Poor Sisters of St. Francis to Archbishop Johannes von Geissel of Cologne for approval. He approved it in July 1851, despite some authorities' objections to Schervier's severe position on personal poverty.Schervier and 23 of her colleagues were invested as the Poor Sisters of St. Francis on 12 August, 1851. Schervier was elected as the mother superior.

During 1851, the sisters began care for female inmates at the jail in Aachen; they also established a foundation, or chapter, in the city of Bonn in Prussia. Schervier in 1852 established the new order's first motherhouse in Aachen. That same year, Schervier opened two foundations in Cologne in Prussia, along with a hospital in Aachen. Two years later, in 1855, the order opened foundations in three more Prussian cities; Ratingen, Mayence and Coblenz. In 1855, Schervier expanded in Prussia to the Kaiserswerth section of Dusseldorf, along with the cities of Crefeld and Euskirchen. In 1857, she encouraged Johannes Höver, a Franciscan tertiary, in his efforts to establish the Poor Brothers of St. Francis.

=== United States ===
During the 1850's, large numbers of Catholics immigrated to Cincinnati, Ohio, from the German states. As few of them spoke English, the Archdiocese of Cincinnati needed German-speaking sisters to operate hospitals, schools and orphanages. Archbishop John Baptist Purcell in 1858 asked the philanthropist Sarah Peter to find sisters for the archdiocese. On the advice of Pope Pius IX, she contacted von Geissel, who recommended speaking to Schervier.

Schervier in August 1858 sent six Poor Sisters to Cincinnati. The next year, the nuns opened St. Mary's Hospital in Cincinnati. With the arrival of more nuns in 1860, the order established a motherhouse in Covington, Kentucky, across the Ohio River from Cincinnati. Covington resident Henrietta Cleveland in 1860 asked Purcell to also open a hospital in Covington for the poor. With fundraising assistance from Peter, St. Elizabeth Hospital opened in 1861.

With the beginning of the American Civil War in 1861, St. Mary's Hospital started receiving a large number of wounded soldiers. Schervier made her first visit to the United States in 1863 to visits the nuns in Cincinnati and help at St. Mary's Hospital. Schervier visited the United States in 1863, and helped her Sisters nurse soldiers wounded in the American Civil War. The nuns in 1863 opened a second St. Mary Hospital in Hoboken, New Jersey, to serve the wounded and poor immigrants.

After the war, Schervier in 1868 made a second visit to Ohio. She attended the dedication of a new hospital facility for St. Elizabeth's, which was now staffed by 12 Poor Sisters. Frances Schervier died in Aachen on 14 December 1876.

== Legacy ==
When Schervier died, there were 2,500 Poor Sisters worldwide. The number kept growing until the 1970s, when, like many other religious orders, they began to experience a sharp decline in membership.

In 1959, the American province of the congregation separated from the German branch, to become an independent congregation called the Franciscan Sisters of the Poor. They have their headquarters in Brooklyn, New York. They are still engaged in operating a hospital and a home for the aged in Walden, New York, but have transferred the ownership of many of their institutions to other organizations. The Frances Schervier Home and Hospital was founded by the Sisters in the Bronx, New York, and named in her honor. (It too has been transferred as of 2000 to a medical chain but continues to operate under this name.) Currently this Congregation focuses on health care, pastoral ministries, and social service.

== Veneration ==
=== Beatification ===
In 1934, the Vatican opened the canonization cause for Schervier. In 1969, Pope Paul VI proclaimed the "heroicity of the virtues" of Schervier and declared her "Venerable". In 1972, Paul VI, on appeal by Bishop Johannes Pohlschneider of Aachen, granted an apostolic dispensation that required the Vatican to only certify one miracle for Schervier's beathification.

In 1973, the "medically inexplicable" and sudden cure of Ludwig Braun from a life-threatening pancreatic and intestinal ailment was recognized as the miracle necessary for the beatification of Schervier. The decree recognizing the Braun miracle was signed in October 1973 by Paul VI. The pope beatified Schervier on 28 April 1974, in RomeI.

=== Candidacy for sainthood ===
In March 1989, Thomas Siemers was in a hospital, comatose after suffering a massive brain hemorrhage. His prognosis was no recover. His wife Susan prayed a novena over a card bearing Schervier's image and asked for her intercession. Thomas awoke soon after this and was transferred to a rehabilitation center ten days later. He eventually regained his health.

In July 2008 the cause for Schervier's canonization was introduced in Rome by Tiziana Merletti, congregational minister of the Franciscan Sisters of the Poor, and Sister Katharina Maria Finken, S.P.S.F., superior general of the Poor Sisters of St. Francis.

In April 2009, the Archdiocese of Cincinnati opened the Diocesan Inquiry Process to gather evidence on the Siemers cure. It closed in December 2009. In March 2010, the Vatican opened up the documents from the Diocesan Inquiry in Rome.

== See also ==
- Franciscan Sisters of the Poor
- Poor Sisters of St. Francis

== Sources ==
- Mccloskey, Patrick (1999). Day by Day with Followers of Francis & Clare. Cincinnati: St. Anthony Messenger Press. ISBN 978-0-86716-336-0.
- Jeiler, P. I. (1924). The Venerable Mother Frances Schervier, Foundress of the Congregation of the Sisters of the Poor of Saint Francis: a Sketch of her Life and Character. Translated by Bonaventura Hammer. St. Louis, Missouri: B. Herder.
