= List of congregations of the Franciscan Third Order Regular in the United States =

Congregations of religious order

The Third Order of Saint Francis comprises the Secular Franciscan Order and the Third Order Regular. Many religious congregations follow the Rule of the Third Order Regular. There are approximately 80 congregations of Third Order Regular women and men in the United States.

== Friars ==
By 15th century congregations of regular friars following the Rule of the Third Order had been established in Italy, Sicily, Dalmatia, Spain, Portugal, France, Germany, and in the Netherlands.

- The Congregation of the Brothers of the Poor of St. Francis was founded in 1857 in Aachen by John Hoever for the protection and education of poor, homeless boys. In 1866, they began establishing orphanages the United States, including ones in Teutopolis, Illinois; Detroit, Michigan; Cincinnati, Ohio; and Cold Spring, Kentucky. By 1998 there were 24 professed members dispersed across several assignments at schools, prisons and hospitals. The Morris School for Boys, established in 1922 near Searcy, Arkansas, continues to be the brothers' primary ministry. The order's motherhouse remains in Aachen and the order maintains houses in Brazil, Holland and the United States.
- In 1858 Bishop John Loughlin issued an invitation to the Brothers of the monastery in Roundstone, County Galway, to operate schools for the boys of the Diocese of Brooklyn. A group of six Brothers, soon arrived and opened St. Francis Monastery and St. Francis Academy (now the site of St. Francis College), the first Catholic school in Brooklyn. The monastery served as the base of operations for the Franciscan Brothers of Brooklyn as they spread out over the City of Brooklyn in their ministry of education. In 1989, Pope John Paul II raised the congregation to one of Pontifical Right, making them independent of the local bishop, almost entirely subject only to the Holy See. As a result, they have begun to serve in other parts of the United States. As of 2016 the Brothers minister in schools, parishes, and other pastoral ministries of the Catholic Church in the Dioceses of Brooklyn, Rockville Centre, Paterson, New Jersey and Cape Girardeau, Missouri.
- The Franciscan Brothers of the Holy Cross (FFSC) was founded by Brother James Wirth in 1862 in Hausen, Germany, to care for orphans, the poor, the sick, and the suffering. In 1891, three Brothers settled in Bad Kreuznach, where they began working at St. Marienwörth hospital. The Brothers were invited to Springfield, Illinois in 1928 to establish a monastery and a trade school, which operated from 1930 to 1972. They later developed "Brother James Court", an intermediate care facility for the developmentally disabled. St. Joseph's motherhouse is in Hausen.
- The Franciscan Missionary Brothers of the Sacred Heart of Jesus were founded in Poland in 1888 and focus on medical care. They established a long term medical care facility in the U.S. in 1927. Located in the suburbs of St. Louis, Missouri, they now operate a hospital and nursing home for mentally disadvantaged men and boys, as well as Price Memorial Hall, a general nursing home. As of 2002, there were 22 brothers.
- The Amigonian Friars was founded in Spain in 1889 by the Capuchin Friar Luis Amigó y Ferrer specializing in working with young boys facing issues of juvenile delinquency and drug addiction. They soon established reform schools and trade schools to help these boys. In 1986 they took over the administration of two youth facilities in San Juan, Puerto Rico.
- Other Third Order Regular (TOR) communities were active in the USA, including the Franciscan Missionary Brothers of the Sacred Heart, Little Brothers of St. Francis, Franciscan Brothers of Christ the King, Franciscan Friars of the Atonement, Franciscan Brothers of the Sacred Heart, Franciscan Brothers of the Eucharist, Franciscan Friars of the Holy Spirit, Knights of the Holy Eucharist, and the Franciscan Brothers of Peace.

== Sisters ==
Congregations of religious sisters of the Third Order were also established; for instance, the Grey Sisters of the Third Order served in hospitals France and the Netherlands. In 1403 Elizabeth of Reute and several other young women who were Franciscan tertiaries, under the guidance of the provost of the Canonry of St. Peter in Waldsee, acquired a house in Reute on the outskirts of Waldsee. Angelina of Marsciano is generally credited with the founding of the Third Order Regular for women around 1395, but the Third Order Regular was not made official until Pope Nicholas V authorized it. Unlike the Second Order of the Franciscan movement, the Poor Clare nuns, they were not an enclosed religious order, and lived under the authority of the local bishop of the diocese.

While many religious congregations have their motherhouse in Europe, some emigrated to the United States to establish new branches of their congregation. Others followed the examples of those from Europe and established their own communities. Some monasteries were established to pursue a purely contemplative life, usually in an urban setting; while other communities consider active works of charity, tending to the poor and sick as part of Franciscan charism.

== Congregations sorted by location ==
=== California ===
The Congregation of the Franciscan Hospitaller Sisters of the Immaculate Conception was founded in Lisbon, Portugal in 1871 by Libânia do Carmo Galvão Mexia de Moura Telles e Albuquerque (Sr. Maria Clara), and is represented in fifteen countries. They came to the United States in 1960 in order to aid Portuguese immigrants. They serve in the state of California in the dioceses of San Jose, Fresno, and Monterey. The majority of the California sisters now are involved in healthcare. The Motherhouse is in Lisbon.

In 2024, the Franciscan Friars of California Inc. filed for bankruptcy, joining a growing roster of Catholic entities that sought similar protections in 2023. The Oakland-based Catholic order, filed for Chapter 11 on Dec. 31 2023 in the US Bankruptcy Court for the Northern District of California.

=== Colorado ===
The Sisters of St. Francis of Perpetual Adoration was founded in Olpe in 1863 by Blessed Maria Theresia Bonzel as the "Poor Sisters of St. Francis Seraph of the Perpetual Adoration". Introduced into the United States in 1875, St. Joseph Province is based at Mt. St. Francis in Colorado Springs, Colorado.

=== Illinois ===
- The Hospital Sisters of St. Francis was founded in Telgte, Germany by Father Christoph Bernsmeyer in 1847. The General Motherhouse is in Münster. They arrived in the United States in 1875 and established St. John's Hospital (Springfield, Illinois), plus fifteen more throughout Illinois and in Missouri and Wisconsin. They also founded an orphan asylum and two nursing schools. The American province is based in Springfield, Illinois.
- The Franciscan Sisters, Daughters of the Sacred Hearts of Jesus and Mary were founded in Olpe, Germany in 1860 by Mother Clara Pfaender to care for the sick poor. They came to the United States in 1872 in response to a request for medical care for the German immigrant community of St. Louis, Missouri. Five Sisters were sent in 1875 to add to the fledgling mission, but all perished in a much-noted shipwreck commemorated by Gerard Manley Hopkins, in the poem "The Wreck of the Deutschland". The sisters established hospitals, schools, orphanages and other fields of ministry. They sponsor Wheaton Franciscan Healthcare. The international congregational office is in Rome. The American provincial motherhouse is in Wheaton, Illinois.

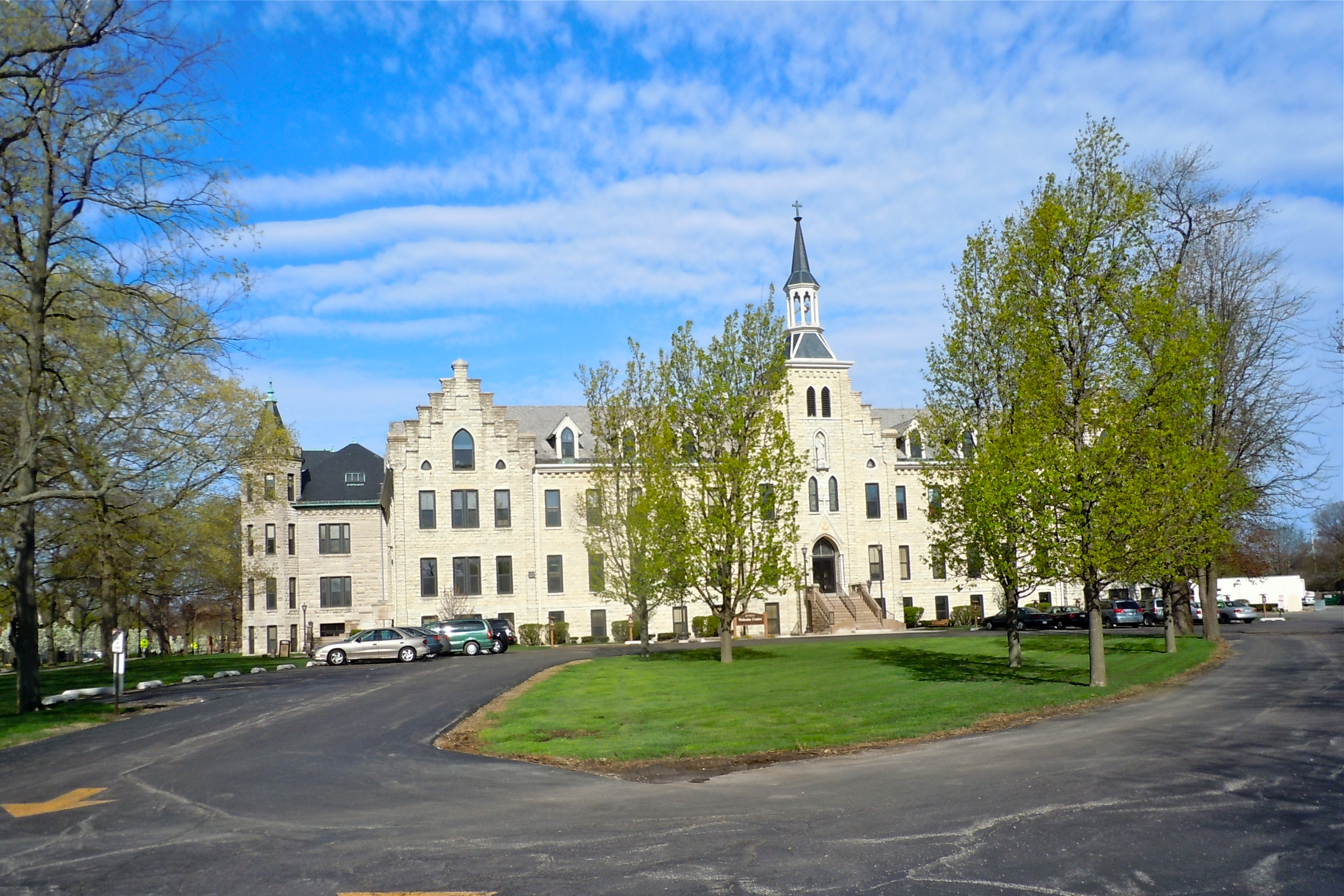
University of St Francis, Joliet

- The Sisters of St. Francis of Mary Immaculate (commonly known as the "Joliet Franciscans") were founded in Joliet, Illinois in 1865 by Mother Mary Alfred Moes with the assistance of Father Pamfilo da Magliano, OFM. Moes had emigrated from Luxembourg, having heard Bishop John Martin Henni of Milwaukee, Wisconsin recruiting teachers. Until 1880, the order used the Constitution drafted for the Franciscan Sisters of Allegany, a congregation da Magliano had previously established. Although initially trained as teachers, the sisters broadened the scope of their ministry to serve as nurses and social workers.
- The Franciscan Sisters of the Sacred Heart was founded in 1866 in Seelbach, then part of the Grand Duchy of Baden, by the Reverend Wilhelm Berger. Due to the Kulturkampf between the German government and the Catholic Church, in which only religious communities which provided nursing were allowed to remain functioning, in 1876 the community emigrated to the United States and established itself in Avilla, Indiana. They have taught in schools throughout the Midwestern United States. The motherhouse is in Frankfort, Illinois.
- The Sisters of St. Francis of the Martyr St. George was founded in 1869 in Thuine, Germany. St. Elizabeth Province in the United States began in 1923 when five sisters were sent at the request of Father Dunne, of St. Louis, Missouri, then a center of German immigration. The Sisters moved to Alton, where they established Saint Anthony’s Infirmary, a residence for the elderly. As of 2010, there are over 100 Sisters in the United States (the total congregation numbers more than 1,600). They operate facilities for elderly care for both the general public and also with special facilities for the clergy, as well as child care and education. The Provincial motherhouse is in Alton, Illinois.
- The Congregation of the Sisters of the Holy Family of Nazareth was founded in Rome by Frances Siedliska in 1875. In 1885, Siedliska and eleven sisters traveled to the United States, where they had been invited to minister to the needs of Polish immigrants in Chicago.
- The Sisters of the Third Order of St. Francis of Peoria was founded in 1877 by Rev. John Lancaster Spalding, Bishop of Peoria, and M. Frances Krasse from a local community of the Sisters of the Third Order of St. Francis in Dubuque, Iowa. Their motherhouse is at OSF Saint Francis Medical Center, a Level I adult and pediatric trauma center affiliated with the OSF Saint Francis College of Nursing and the University of Illinois College of Medicine.

In 1893, at the request of Father Thomas Mackin, pastor of St. Joseph’s Church in Rock Island, Illinois, sisters from the Franciscan Sisters of the Immaculate Conception of Little Falls traveled to Rock Island, Illinois to open St. Anthony's Hospital. In 1901, the Rock Island congregation became an independent community but merged with the Sisters of St. Francis of Peoria in 1989.

- In 1894 Josephine Dudzik founded the "Franciscan Sisters of St. Kunegunda", to assist the poor, sick, elderly, and abandoned in Chicago's predominantly Polish northwest side. Now known as the Franciscan Sisters of Chicago, the congregation is particularly involved in the enhancement and expansion of retirement communities and other senior services. The motherhouse is in Lemont, Illinois.

=== Indiana ===
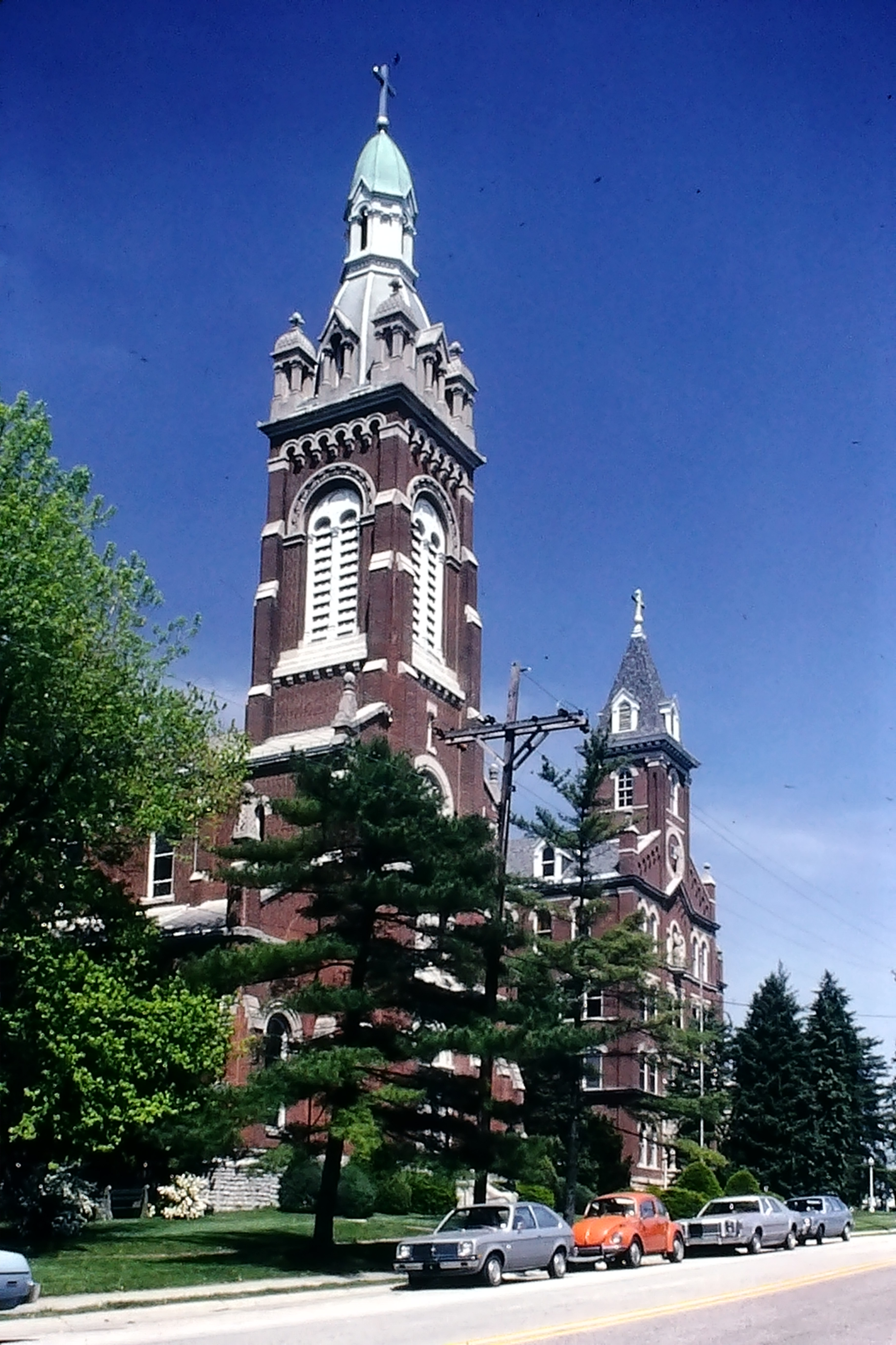
Convent Chapel & Convent, Oldenburg, Indiana

- The Sisters of St. Francis, Oldenburg, Indiana was founded in 1851 by Mother Theresa Hackelmeier (1827–1860), who journeyed to the United States from a convent in Vienna, Austria, alone, after her companion chose to return. They had set out at the request of the Rev. Francis Joseph Rudolf, the pastor in Oldenburg, Indiana. His goal was the care and education of the German-speaking children in his parish and the many children left orphaned by a large cholera outbreak in 1847. Three other women soon joined her and the foundation for a new congregation was laid. Its rules and constitutions were soon approved by the Holy See. Indiana had established state support of community-based schools before her arrival, so education became a major focus of the small community, both in Oldenburg, and quickly in other local communities. By the time of Mother Theresa's untimely death in 1860, the community had already established a mission in St. Louis, Missouri as well having to rebuild their convent after a devastating fire in 1857. By the 1890s they had spread out to schools in Kentucky, Ohio, Illinois and Kansas as well. In 1892 they established their first school for African-American children in a segregated Indianapolis. In the 20th century, their work extended to Native Americans and overseas to Papua New Guinea and Korea. As of 2012 there were 235 Sisters in the congregation serving the poor in the Appalachian Mountains, those on Indian reservations and in inner cities. Additionally, they serve in pastoral care at parishes and hospitals; and teach at elementary, high school and college levels, including Marian University.

=== Iowa ===
- The "Sisters of Saint Francis of the Immaculate Conception of the Blessed Virgin Mary", commonly known as the Sisters of St. Francis (Clinton, Iowa), was founded in Kentucky in 1867 by Dom Benedict Berger, Abbot of Gethsemani Abbey, to teach in the schools of the territory for which the abbey had the pastoral care, and approved by the Rt. Rev. Peter Joseph Lavialle, Bishop of Louisville, Kentucky. The first sisters were sent to train with the Oldenburg Franciscans. Due to economic circumstances, in 1890 the Sisters accepted the bishop's invitation to relocate to Dubuque, Iowa. In 1922, the Sisters of St. Francis amalgamated with thirteen Sisters of St. Francis of the Sacred Heart of Burlington, Iowa and acquired Burlington Hospital. As of 2015 there were 55 sisters with a motherhouse in Clinton.
- The Sisters of the Third Order of Saint Francis of the Holy Family was founded in 1864 by Mother Xaveria Termehr and other sisters in Herford, Germany; in 1875 on account of the Falk Laws they were forced to leave Germany and emigrated to Iowa. Their motherhouse, Mt. St. Francis, is in Dubuque, Iowa.

=== Kansas ===
The Sisters of the Sorrowful Mother was founded in 1883 and inspired by the Salvatorians. They came to the United States at the invitation of the Bishop of Wichita, Kansas, in 1889, and within two years had opened four hospitals and an orphanage, as well as teaching in parish schools.

=== Kentucky ===
The Franciscan Sisters of the Immaculate Conception, more commonly known as the "Franciscan Sisters of Glasgow", was founded in Glasgow in 1847 by Adelaide Vaast and Veronica Cordier from the Franciscan Monastery of Our Lady of the Angels, in Tourcoing, France. The sisters first came to the United States in 1971, where they work in various ministries in Kentucky and Washington, D.C.

=== Louisiana ===
In 1911 Mother Marie de Bethanie Crowley with five companions of the Franciscan Sisters of Calais came to central Louisiana at the request of Cornelius Van de Ven, Bishop of Alexandria, Louisiana. Their first foundation was a sanitarium in Pineville, Louisiana. They went on to found several medical facilities: St. Francis Hospital in Monroe, Our Lady of Lourdes in Lafayette, Our Lady of the Lake Hospital in Baton Rouge and St. Elizabeth Hospital in Gonzales. In 1964, the congregation adopted the name Franciscan Missionaries of Our Lady. The North American Provincial Motherhouse is located in Baton Rouge.

=== Massachusetts ===
- The Little Franciscans of Mary was founded at Worcester, Massachusetts in 1889, and established their motherhouse in Baie-St-Paul, Quebec, in 1891. As of 2016, the Little Franciscans of Mary work in Quebec, the United States, Madagascar, and Haiti in the fields of education, health care, social work and pastoral ministry.
- The Franciscan Missionary Sisters for Africa was founded in 1952 by Mother Mary Kevin of the Sacred Passion (born Theresa Kearney, County Wicklow, Ireland) as an offshoot from the Mill Hill Sisters, with the purpose of focusing on the African missions. A convent was established in Boston, Massachusetts, in 1952, with an American novitiate being opened in 1954. The Generalate is in Dublin, Ireland.

=== Minnesota ===
- The Missionary Franciscan Sisters of the Immaculate Conception was founded by Mother Ignatius Hayes in Belle Prairie, Minnesota in 1872. Hayes joined a congregation founded by Mary Elizabeth Lockhart, the Franciscan Sisters of the Immaculate Conception and St Francis at Bayswater, before completing her training with the "Glasgow Franciscans". She and a few companions arrived at Belle Prairie to worked with the children of Canadian immigrants. In 1964, 26 members of the congregation of the Franciscan Sisters of the Immaculate Conception, merged with the Minnesota community. The Sisters also serve in the United States in the Archdioceses of New York, Newark, Boston, Pittsburgh, and Savannah. The generalate is in Rome, Italy, and there are about 250 sisters worldwide.

Hayes returned to Rome in 1880, and met with Pope Leo XIII, who suggested that the novitiate of the new congregation be established there, in keeping with its missionary character. Having lost contact with her for an extended time, some of the sisters in Minnesota decided to travel to Italy to join the rest of the congregation. In March 1891, those that chose to remain re-organized themselves as the Franciscan Sisters of Little Falls, under the Diocese of Saint Cloud. As of 2019 they numbered about 115 sisters, serving primarily in Minnesota, with missions throughout the United States, as well as in Ecuador and Mexico.

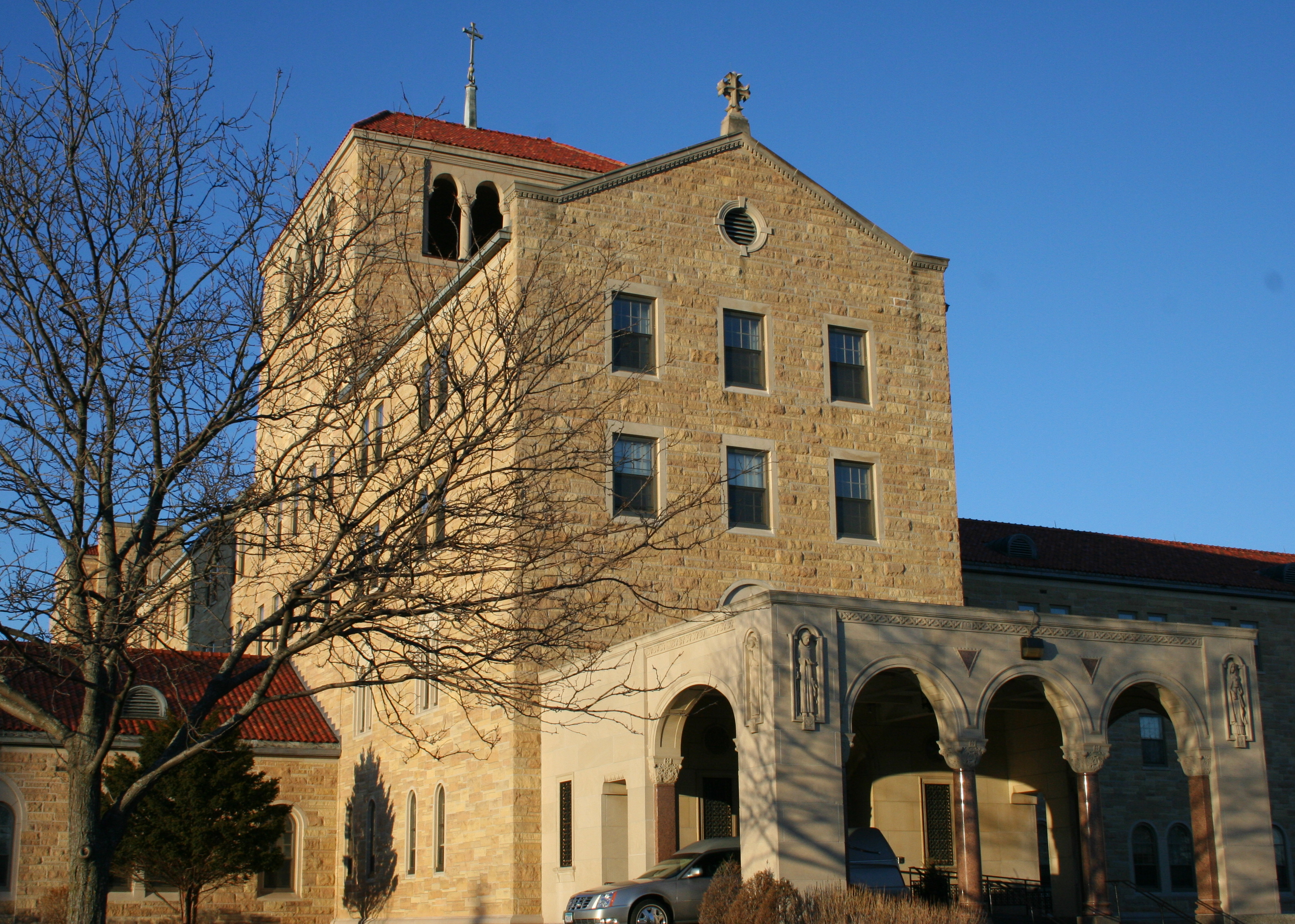
Assisi Heights mother house.

- The Sisters of the Congregation of Our Lady of Lourdes of the Third Order Regular of Saint Francis, also known as the Sisters of Saint Francis of Rochester, Minnesota, was founded in 1877 by Mother Mary Alfred Moes of the "Joliet Franciscans". The new congregation built St. Mary's Hospital. It is now part of the Mayo Clinic, which grew out of their work. They also established the College of Saint Teresa in Winona. The motherhouse is Assisi Heights in Rochester, Minnesota.

=== Missouri ===
- The congregation of the Sisters of St. Mary was established in St. Louis, Missouri by Mary Odilia Berger in 1874. She and some companions had left Germany to provide nursing care to the German immigrant population of the city. Mary Augustine Giesen led a group of sisters from St. Louis to Maryville, Missouri, in 1894 to focus on providing healthcare to rural areas; and served especially in the railroad hospitals in the Midwest. They formed the Sisters of St. Francis of Maryville. In 1985 the two congregations merged to form the Franciscan Sisters of Mary. The congregation operates 20 hospitals in the Midwestern United States.
- The Sisters of St. Francis of the Holy Eucharist (Sisters of the Third Order of St. Francis of Perpetual Adoration) was established in 1378 in Switzerland. In 1893 Sister M. John Hau and some companions from the motherhouse at Grimmenstein established St. Francis Convent and Home in Nevada, Missouri. They later relocated to Independence, Missouri, where they run a retreat center which also hosts a secular fraternity.
- The Franciscan Sisters of Our Lady of Perpetual Help, commonly known as the "St. Louis Catholic Sisters" trace their roots to the "Joliet Franciscans", who came to St. Louis, Missouri to assist Polish-speaking immigrants. In 1901 three members of the Joliet Franciscans formed a separate community, which for the first twenty years was known as the "Polish Franciscan School Sisters of St. Louis". As of 2022, Sisters minister in eleven states in the fields of education, healthcare, social services and parish ministry. The administrative offices are located in the Tau Center in Kirkwood, Missouri.

=== Nebraska ===
- The Franciscan Sisters of the Sorrowful Mother are a religious congregation in Nebraska established in 1990. The community came from a split of several Sisters from the Daughters of the Heart of Mary, Franciscans, which had been founded in Mexico in 1873. Sister Ana Maria Solis and others in the Mexican congregation wanted a more Franciscan character to their way of life. They first formed a new congregation which served the Hispanic community in Wisconsin. After nine years, they moved to Lincoln by the invitation of Bishop Fabian Bruskewitz. They are currently involved in catechetical work and social service to the Hispanic population in the Nebraska City area.
- The Franciscan Apostolic Sisters were founded in 1953 by Gerardo Filipetto to assist the missionary Franciscan friars in their work. They established a community in the Diocese of Lincoln, Nebraska, in 1992, and later in Illinois and Rhode Island. The motherhouse is in Cagayan, the Philippines.

=== New Jersey ===
- The Franciscan Servants of the Holy Child Jesus were founded in 1855 in Oberzell, Germany, by Antonia Werr to minister to the needs of women who were neglected by society; in particular, prisoners, prostitutes and the destitute poor. The Sisters came to the United States in 1929 at the request of some Franciscan friars in Rensselaer, New York. They established their first foundation on Staten Island, New York. Their principal ministries are in social work, health care and teaching. The Provincial Motherhouse is in Plainfield, New Jersey.

In 2006, the Franciscan Sisters of Washington, D.C. developed as an offshoot of the Holy Child Sisters.

- The Franciscan Sisters of Saint Elizabeth (FSSE) were founded in 1862 in Naples by Ludovico of Casoria, under the patronage of Elizabeth of Hungary, an early member of the Third Order of St. Francis. They are active in Italy, the United States of America, India, Ethiopia, Panama, the Philippines, and Indonesia. The motherhouse is in Rome. In 1919, they arrived in the United States where they work in education and parish ministry.

=== New York ===
- The Franciscan Sisters of Allegany were founded in 1857 by Father Pamfilo of Magliano, one of the founding friars of St. Bonaventure University, to provide education for the young Catholics of Western New York. He based their rule on that of the "Franciscan Sisters of Glasgow". In 1879, three Sisters were sent to Jamaica, British West Indies, to assist the Franciscan Sisters of Glasgow, in establishing a boarding and day school for girls, which they named "The Immaculate Conception Academy". As of 2022, the community is active in Bolivia, Brazil, Jamaica, Mozambique and the United States. The motherhouse is St. Elizabeth's Convent, Allegany, New York.
- The Congregation of the Franciscan Missionary Sisters of the Sacred Heart (FMSC) was founded in 1861 in Gemona del Friuli by Father Gregory Fioravanti and Lady Laura Laroux, Duchess of Bauffremont. In 1865, at the request of the Franciscan Fathers, three Sisters came to the parish of St. Francis of Assisi, New York City to serve immigrants, orphans, and the poor. The motherhouse is in Peekskill, New York. In 1933 the sisters founded Ladycliff College in Highland Falls, New York, next to the United States Military Academy in West Point. When the college closed in 1980, the academy acquired the property. It now houses the academy's museum. As of 2017, there were 700 sisters in twenty-two countries.

The Franciscan Sisters of Peace was founded in 1986 by 112 sisters who chose to leave the Franciscan Missionary Sisters of the Sacred Heart for a simpler form of life. Today, they continue to work as teachers, social workers, administrators, parish associates, prison chaplains, retreat directors, day care workers and health care workers in the New York metropolitan area. Their headquarters is in Haverstraw, New York.

- The Sisters of St. Francis of Penance and Christian Charity is an international congregation founded in 1835 in Heythuysen, Netherlands, by Catherine Damen to care for neglected children. The Sisters arrived in New York City in 1874 at the request of the German Jesuits of St. Michael's parish in Buffalo, New York, where there was a need for German-speaking sisters to teach the expanding German population on Buffalo's east side. Today the New York province is based in Stella Niagara, New York, with provinces also in Denver, Colorado, and Redwood City, California, as well as other countries.
- The Franciscan Sisters of St. Joseph developed from the Sisters of Charity of St. Charles Borromeo, when in 1889 sisters from the latter congregation were sent from Poland to teach at St. Stanislaus parish in Pittsburgh. Eight years later, while working in Trenton, Agnes Victoria Hilbert, known as Sister Mary Colette was asked by the Bishop of Buffalo to establish a new congregation. With the help of some Franciscan Conventual friars, the Franciscan Sisters of St. Joseph was founded. As the congregation grew, the motherhouse was moved from Buffalo to Hamburg, New York. There they established a teacher training college for the sisters, which later became Hilbert College. As of 2016, there were about sixty sisters in the congregation, with an average age of eighty.
- The Franciscan Handmaids of the Most Pure Heart of Mary was established in 1916 in Savannah, Georgia, by Elizabeth Williams and Father Ignatius Lissner to educate of children of color. In 1924 the congregation Motherhouse was moved to Harlem in New York at the invitation of Patrick Cardinal Hayes. The congregation operates St. Benedict Nursery in Harlem, St. Edward Food Pantry on Staten Island, and are active in Yonkers and Owerri, Nigeria.
- The Franciscan Missionary Sisters of St. Joseph was founded in 1883 by Alice Ingham. With their motherhouse in Mill Hill, London, they are more commonly known as the "Mill Hill Sisters". The congregation was introduced into the United States in 1952. The provincial Motherhouse is in Albany, New York.
- In 1845 Frances Schervier founded at Aachen the Poor Sisters of St. Francis. In 1868 sisters from Germany came to the United States, establishing medical centers in New York City, New Jersey and Ohio to serve the needs of the large German emigrant communities. In 1959, the American provinces of the Congregation were separated from the German Motherhouse to become an independent Congregation under the name Franciscan Sisters of the Poor (SFP). Their headquarters is in Brooklyn, New York.
- The Franciscan Missionaries of Mary was founded in 1877 in Ootacamund, India by Hélène de Chappotin de Neuville. As of 2016, there are almost 8,300 sisters in 75 countries, including Canada, England, Scotland, and the United States, where they sponsor the Cardinal Hayes Home in Millbrook, New York, for developmentally challenged individuals.
- The Sisters of St. Francis of the Neumann Communities was formed in 2004 with the merger of three separate congregations: Sisters of St Francis of Syracuse, Sisters of St. Francis of the Mission of the Immaculate Virgin, and the Sisters of St. Francis Third Order Regular of Buffalo (Williamsville Franciscans). During the process of the reorganization, the Franciscan Missionary Sisters of the Divine Child merged with the Williamsville Franciscans in 2003. The Sisters of St. Francis of Millvale joined the congregation in 2007.

In March 1860, responding to the request of Franciscan Friars to teach German immigrant children in New York, nine "Sisters of St. Francis of Philadelphia" went to Syracuse. Later in the year, Bishop Neumann's successor, Bishop James Wood, separated the Syracuse mission from the Philadelphia foundation, creating a first daughter congregation, the Sisters of St Francis of Syracuse, New York.

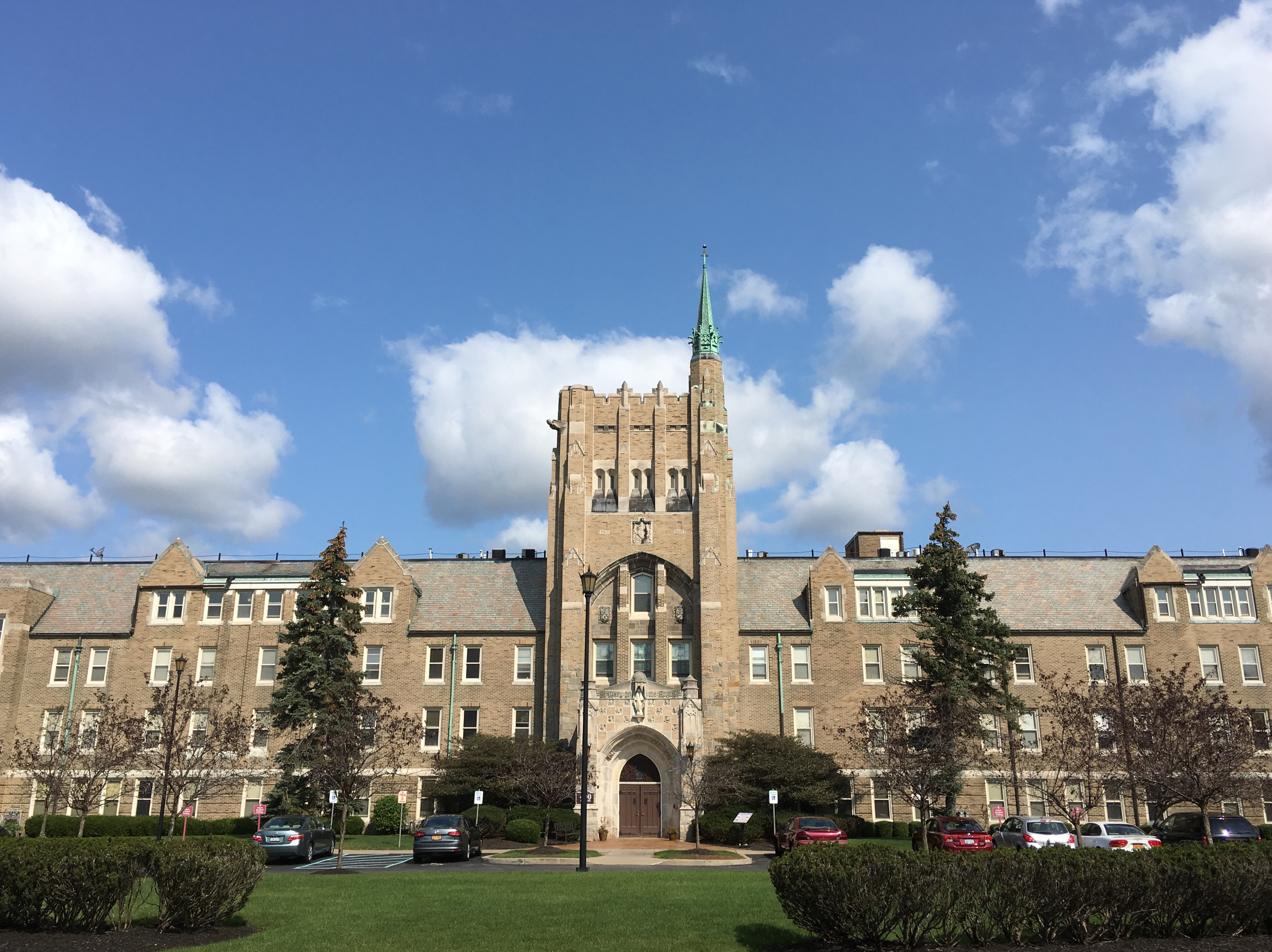
St. Mary of the Angels Motherhouse Complex (Amherst, New York)

"Sisters of St. Francis of Philadelphia" were also sent to Buffalo, New York in response to the plea of the Redemptorist priests to serve the people of the rapidly growing city. The community in Buffalo became a separate congregation in the autumn of 1863, the Sisters of St. Francis Third Order Regular of Buffalo (Williamsville Franciscans). The motherhouse was St. Mary of the Angels.

The Franciscan Missionary Sisters of the Divine Child (known as the "Blue Nuns") was founded in 1927 in Buffalo to serve children of Italian immigrants in need of religious instruction. In 2003 they merged with the Williamsville Franciscans.

The Sisters of St. Francis of Millvale of Mt. Alvernia, Millvale, Pennsylvania was founded in 1865 by sisters from the Buffalo community. The congregation opened hospitals, ran volunteer programs, and operated Mount Alvernia High School for 75 years. In September 2007 they joined the Neumann congregation.

The Sisters of St. Francis of the Mission of the Immaculate Virgin of Hastings-on-Hudson assisted Father John Christopher Drumgoole in the establishment of the Mission of the Immaculate Virgin at Mount Loretto on Staten Island. They also ran St. Francis Hospital in Poughkeepsie, New York.

=== Ohio ===
The Sisters of St. Francis of Tiffin, Ohio was founded in 1867, when Father Joseph Bihn asked for volunteers to help start a home for orphaned children and the aged. Four women answered the call, including Elizabeth Greiveldinger Schaefer. The institution was incorporated in 1869. The congregation operates St. Francis Senior Ministries which provides housing and healthcare choices for seniors. As of 2019, there were eighty-one sisters.

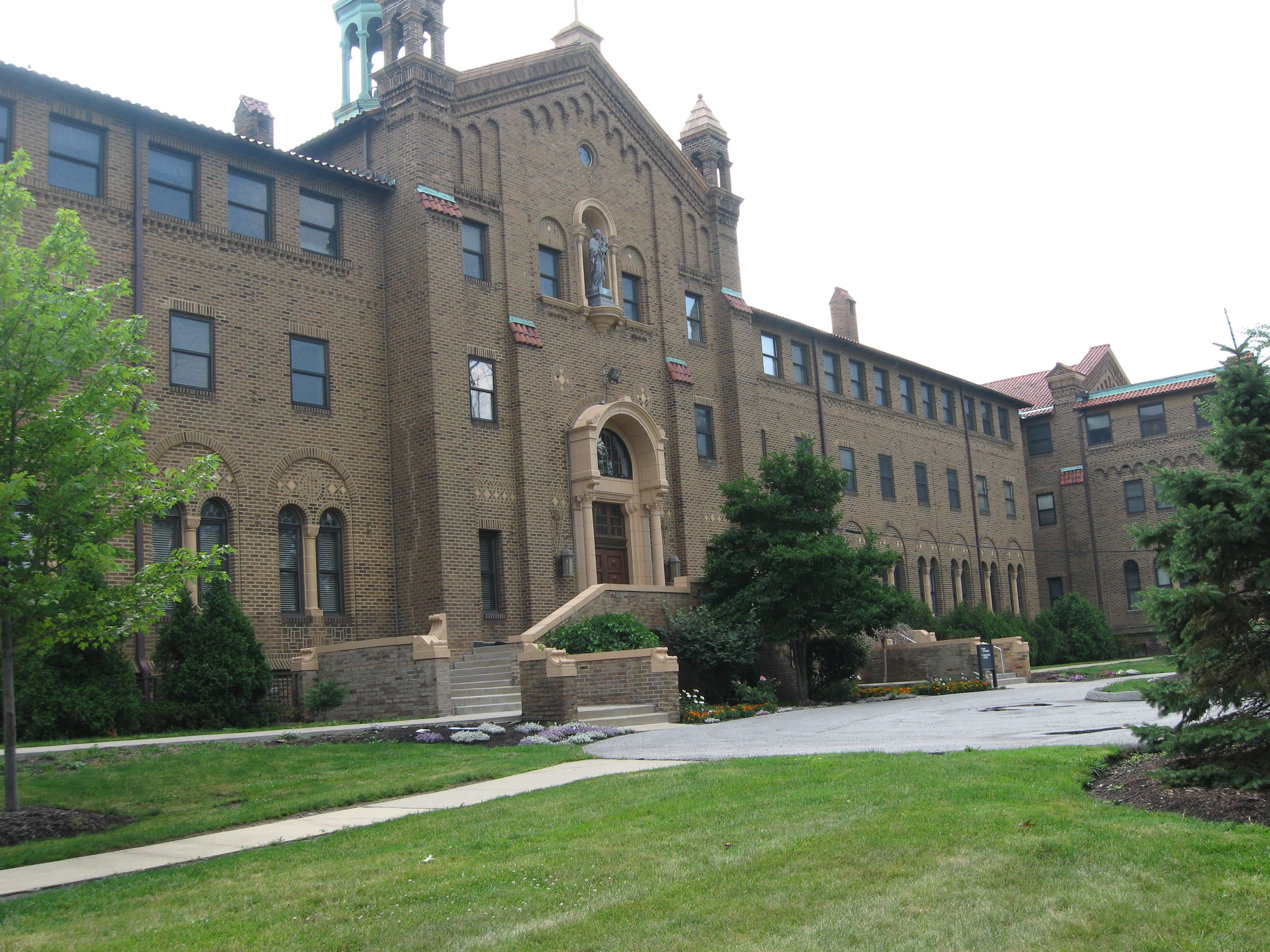
Marymount Congregational Home, Garfield Heights, Ohio

- The Sisters of St. Joseph of the Third Order of St. Francis was founded in 1901 from the German School Sisters of St. Francis. The Polish Sisters withdrew and formed a new congregation to address the educational needs of the children of Polish immigrants, building St. Joseph Motherhouse in Stevens Point, Wisconsin the following year. After strong growth throughout the 20th century, many of their institutions have been either closed or transferred to other organizations. As of 2019, there were 196 sisters. In 2019, the sisters announced that they were relocating from Stevens Point to Marymount Place in Garfield Heights, Ohio.

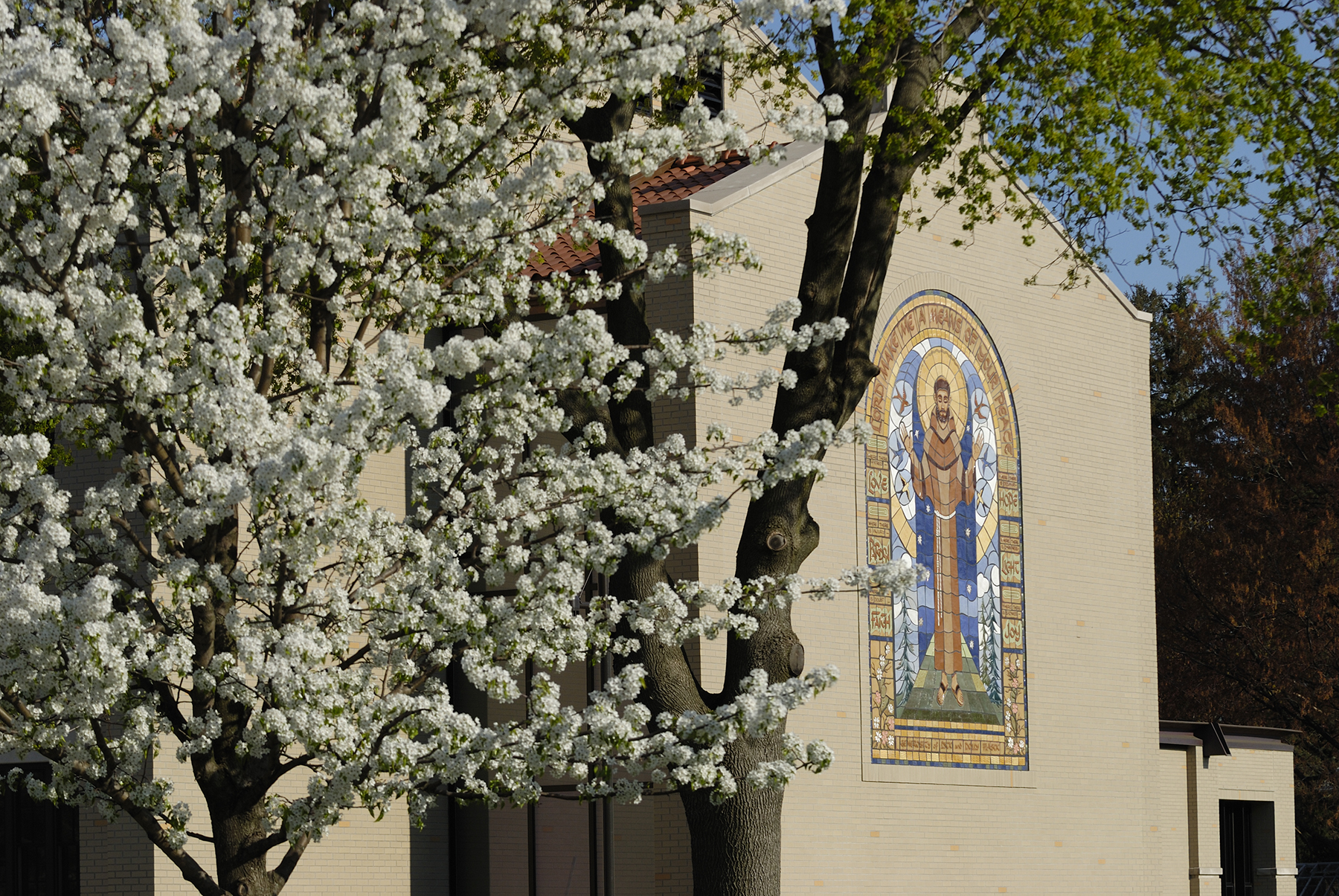
Lourdes University

- The Sisters of St. Francis of Our Lady of Lourdes, also known as the "Sisters of St. Francis of Sylvania, Ohio", was founded by Anne Sandusky, a member of the Sisters of St. Francis, Rochester, Minnesota. In 1916, Bishop Joseph Schrembs of the Diocese of Toledo requested that the Sisters in Rochester send members to the Toledo area to work with the children of Polish immigrants. Sandusky and 22 other sisters established a home in Toledo and began teaching in area schools. The sisters now sponsor Lourdes University. As of 2016 there were about 200 sisters serving in a variety of ministries.
- The Franciscan Sisters of Penance of the Sorrowful Mother are a Roman Catholic religious congregation founded on August 15, 1988, in the Diocese of Steubenville, in Ohio, United States, by Bishop Albert Henry Ottenweller. The sisters work with the poor and needy of the diocese, as well as leading religious retreats and working to catechize the young. They also serve as campus ministers at Franciscan University of Steubenville and at Florida State University in Tallahassee, Florida.

=== Oregon ===
The Franciscan Missionary Sisters of Our Lady of Sorrows was founded in China in 1939, by Bishop Rafael Palazzi, an Italian Franciscan missionary. Due to the Communist takeover, the Sisters were forced to flee from the motherhouse in Hengyang, Hunan, to Hong Kong. After several years as refugees, the community came to the United States, opening retreat houses in California and Oregon. They became involved in the teaching apostolate in both locations, and in care for Navajo girls in Gallup, New Mexico. As of 2022. there were forty-five members serving in Hong Kong, Taiwan, the US, and Canada. The Generalate is in Beaverton, Oregon.

=== Pennsylvania ===
- The Sisters of St. Francis of Philadelphia were founded in 1855 by Maria Anna Boll Bachmann under the guidance of Bishop John Neumann. At the time of the smallpox epidemic of 1858, they continued their care of the sick in patients’ homes or, when necessary, in their small convents. In December 1860, Mother Francis opened the congregation's first hospital, St. Mary's in Philadelphia. During that same year they responded to the need for teachers at St. Alphonsus Parish in Philadelphia. The Sisters of St. Francis of Philadelphia were once known as the Glen Riddle Franciscans. Today, sisters serve in 15 states and in Africa, and Ireland. The motherhouse is in Aston, Pennsylvania.

The "Capuchin Sisters of the Infant Jesus" was founded in 1911 by Angela Clara Pesce to serve the Italian-speaking population of New Jersey, where they ran schools. With their motherhouse in Ringwood, New Jersey, they became known as the Franciscan Sisters of Ringwood (FSR). In 2003 the community merged with the Sisters of St. Francis of Philadelphia.

- The Congregation of Sisters of St. Felix of Cantalice Third Order Regular of St. Francis of Assisi, also known as the Felician Sisters, was founded in 1855 by Sophia Truszkowska in Warsaw. There are 1800 sisters, of whom 700 serve in the North American Province. Other provinces are based in Kraków, Przemyśl, Warsaw, and Curitiba, Brazil. They were introduced into the United States in 1874. The Province of Our Lady of Hope is based in Beaver Falls, Pennsylvania.

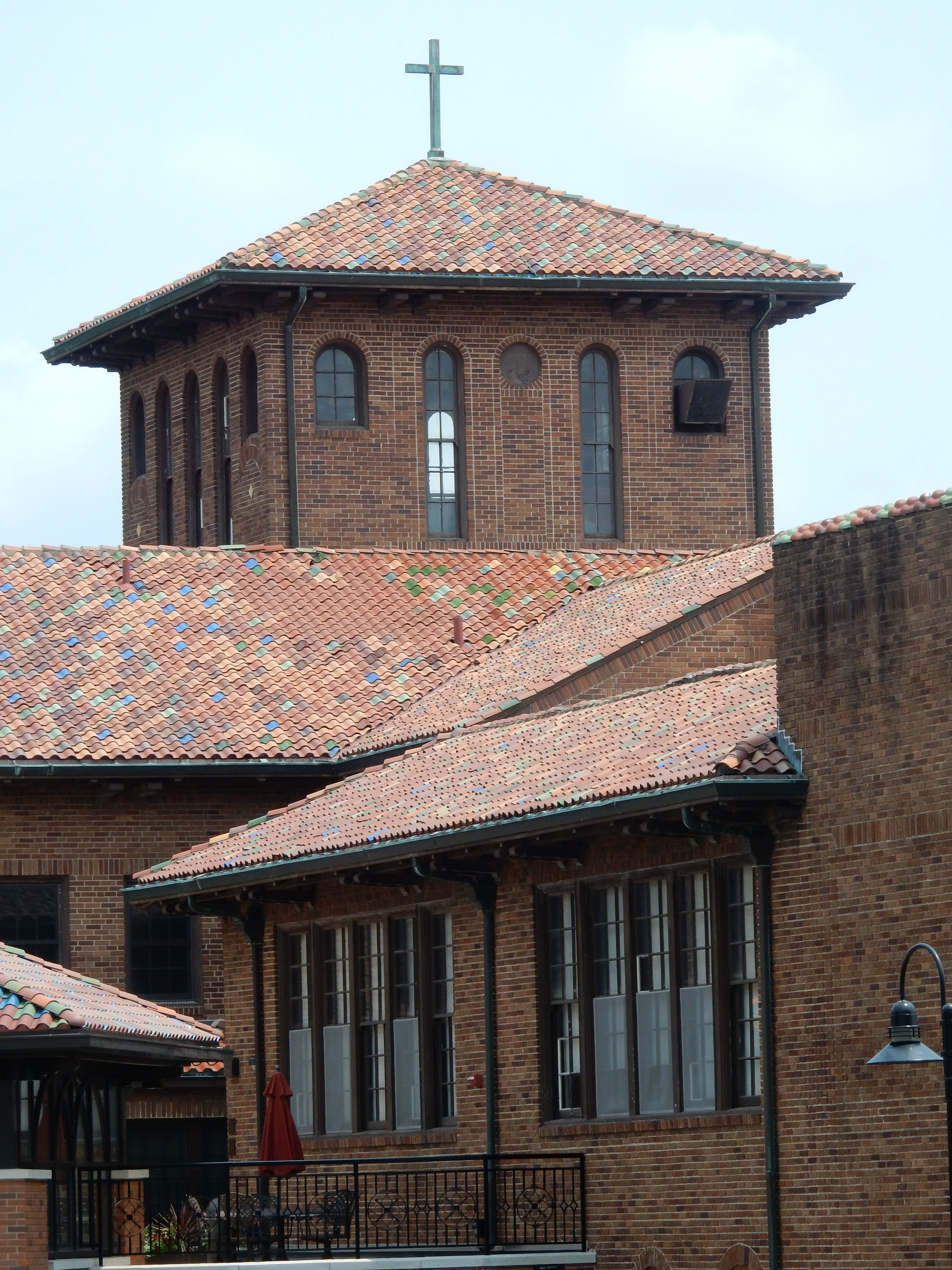
Francis Hall at Alvernia University, Reading, PA.

- The Bernardine Sisters of the Third Order of St. Francis was established in the United States in 1894. The congregation was founded in Cracow, Poland, in 1457, when a group of tertiaries, of the nobility, formed an active community of the Third Order Regular of St. Francis in St. Agnes Convent. Because these Franciscan Sisters attended Mass in a church dedicated to the then recently canonized St. Bernardine of Siena, they became known as the Bernardines. From the Convent of St. Agnes a new foundation, that of St. Joseph, was established in the same city in 1646; St. Joseph Convent gave rise to the Sacred Heart Convent, which was founded at Zakliczyn-on the-Danube in 1883. From there, the Bernardine sisters came to the United States, when they were sent to minister to the Polish immigrants at St. Joseph School in Mount Carmel, Pennsylvania. Shortly thereafter, in 1895, they moved to Reading to teach at St. Mary's School. It was in Reading that the motherhouse was built. The Bernardine Sisters serve in the United States, Brazil, the Dominican Republic, Puerto Rico, Libera and Mozambique. The motherhouse is in Reading, Pennsylvania.
- Around 1922 Sisters of the Holy Family of Nazareth arrived from Chicago to serve Lithuanian immigrants in the Pittsburgh area. With the assistance of the "Millvale Franciscans", they transitioned to become a separate Franciscan community known as the "Lithuanian Sisters of the Third Order of St. Francis of Assisi". Some worked in Lithuania in the 1930s and again in the 1990s. In 1949 they adopted their current name Sisters of St. Francis of the Providence of God to reflect what had become a broader outreach. As of 2015 there were seventy-four members in the United States, Brazil, Bolivia, and Haiti working with children, the homeless, and inmates. They operate the Franciscan Child Day Care Center at the former St. Francis Academy in the Diocese of Pittsburgh.

=== Texas ===
The Franciscan Sisters of Mary Immaculate was founded in Columbia in 1893 by Swiss missionary Maria Josefa Karolina Brader. Introduced to the United States in 1932, the Sisters combine social service with Perpetual Adoration of the Blessed Sacrament. They serve in Texas, California and New Mexico. The Provincial Motherhouse in Amarillo, Texas.

=== Wisconsin ===
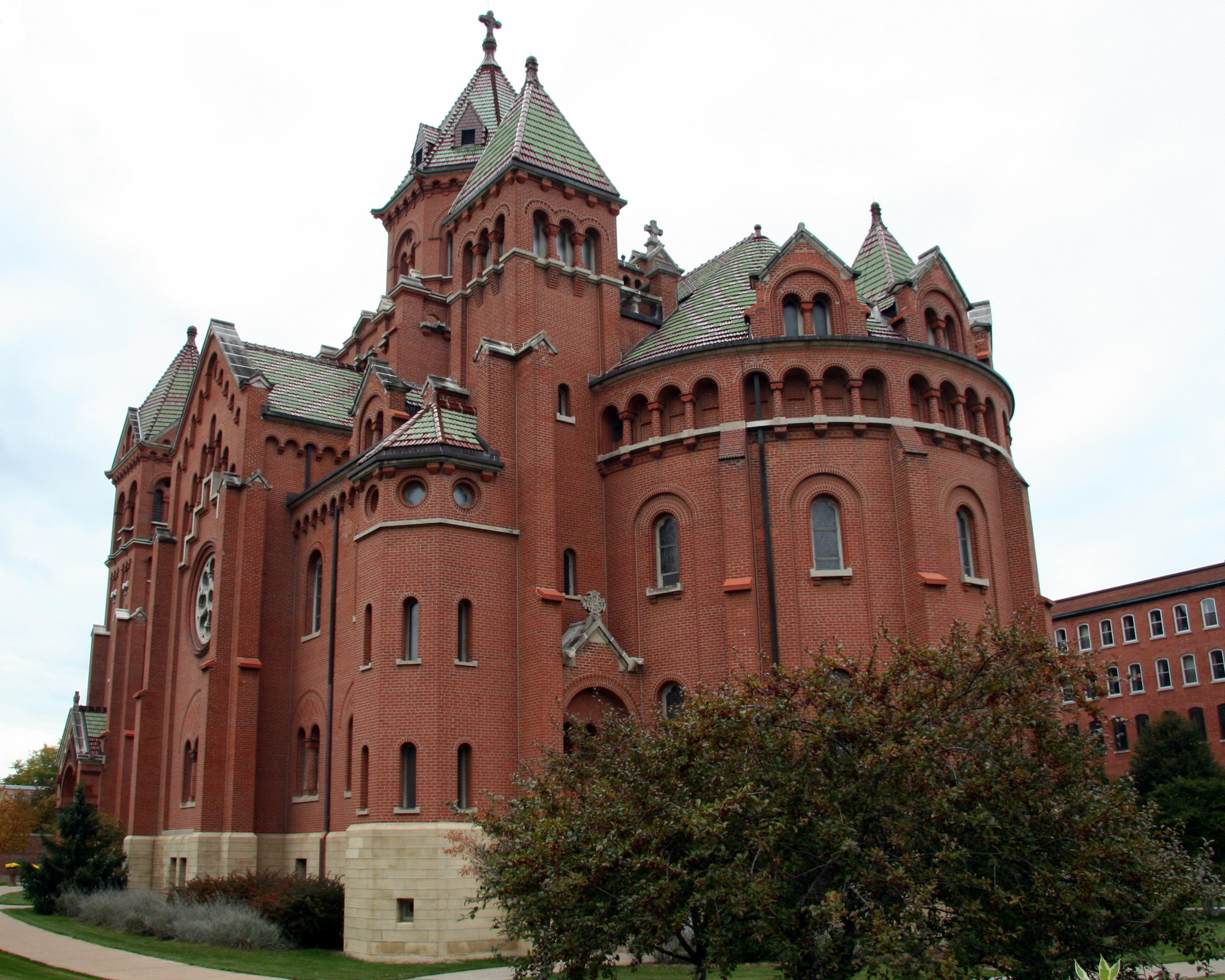
Maria Angelorum Chapel, La Crosse, Wisconsin

- Both the Franciscan Sisters of Perpetual Adoration and the Sisters of St. Francis of Assisi trace their roots to a group of lay Franciscans who came from Bavaria in 1849 at the invitation of Bishop John Martin Henni to serve the German-speaking population of Milwaukee, Wisconsin. In 1853, the women formed a religious community, the "Sisters of the Third Order Regular of St. Francis". In 1856, they were assigned by Bishop Henni to perform domestic work at the seminary he had founded for German-speaking seminarians in Milwaukee. By 1868, Michael Heiss, Bishop of La Crosse, Wisconsin invited the Sisters to move their motherhouse there. In 1873, sisters in Milwaukee ceased their domestic work to relocate to LaCrosse and became the Franciscan Sisters of Perpetual Adoration. Those who chose to remain in Milwaukee became the Sisters of St. Francis of Assisi,

The Franciscan Sisters of Baltimore developed from the "Franciscan Sisters of the Five Wounds", founded in 1868 in Hammersmith, London by Bishop Herbert Vaughan. In 1881, five Sisters of the Five Wounds went to the United States at the invitation of Cardinal James Gibbons, the Archbishop of Baltimore, to care for homeless African American children. This group became the Franciscan Sisters of Baltimore (OSF). The sisters operated an orphanage until 1950, ran a school for children with special needs, and taught in parochial schools on the East Coast. In 2001, the Franciscan Sisters of Baltimore merged with the "Sisters of St. Francis of Assisi". As of 2016 there are about 340 sisters in the combined community, which continues their ministries in Baltimore.

The Franciscan Sisters of the Eucharist was founded in 1973, by fifty-five sisters of the "Franciscan Sisters of Perpetual Adoration" of St. Rose of Viterbo Convent, in La Crosse, Wisconsin. From 1976 to 2004, the sisters operated the ferry terminal and store on Shaw Island, part of the San Juan Islands in the state of Washington. Based in Meriden, Connecticut, as of 2014, the community had thirteen centers around the world, including the United States, Jerusalem, Rome and Assisi. The Sisters teach at universities, work in hospitals, operate a school in Bethlehem and work at the Vatican.

The Tertiary Sisters of St. Francis were established in 1700 in the South Tyrol. In 2000, the Cameroon Province joined a program called "Common Venture" with the Sisters of St. Francis of Assisi, Franciscan Sisters of Perpetual Adoration, and the Franciscan Sisters of the Eucharist, who had developed from one community. The Common Venture program was completed in 2018. A fund developed over the years for the education of the sisters from Cameroon is now held by the FSPA Development Office in La Crosse.

- The Sisters of Mercy of the Holy Cross were founded in Switzerland in 1856 by Capuchin friar Theodosius Florentini and Maria Katherina Scherer. The General Motherhouse is in Ingenbohl, Switzerland. A congregation that specialized in healthcare, they came to the United States in 1912. In 1923 they were invited to Merrill, Wisconsin. The sisters work primarily in Wisconsin and Louisiana. The USA Province is based in Merrill.
- The Sisters of St. Francis of the Holy Cross was founded in 1868 when Father Edward Francis Daems requested assistance in ministering the immigrants on the Door Peninsula of Wisconsin. Sisters Christine Rousseau, Pauline LaPlante, Mary Pius Doyle and Mary Immaculata Van Lanen responded. They laid the foundation for the "Sisters of St. Francis of Bay Settlement", living a simple life, following the Rule of St. Francis, and educating immigrant children. The order was formalized by the Bishop of Green Bay Francis Xavier Krautbauer on March 14, 1881. On its 75th Jubilee in 1956, the community adopted the title Sisters of St. Francis of the Holy Cross.
- The motherhouse of the Franciscan Sisters of Christian Charity is Holy Family Convent, Alverno, Wisconsin. Founded in 1869 at Manitowoc, Wisconsin, by the Rev. Joseph Fessler, it was affiliated to the Order of Friars Minor Conventual 19 March 1900. Franciscan Sisters of Christian Charity Sponsored Ministries operates health care services and long-term care facilities in Nebraska, Ohio and Wisconsin.
- The School Sisters of St. Francis was founded in 1873 by three Sisters who left their community in Schwarzach, Baden-Württemberg, German Empire, led by Mother Alexia Höll, and settled in New Cassel, Wisconsin. Their new community was formally established on April 28, 1874. The number of Sisters grew, until they were allowed to form a separate Province of the congregation in 1907. They established schools, hospitals and sanitaria throughout the nation. As of 2011, the province numbers 625 Sisters, located in 24 states. The provincialate is located in Milwaukee, Wisconsin.
- The Sisters of the Sorrowful Mother was founded in Rome, Italy in 1883 under the Salvatorians and became an independent congregation in 1885. They came to the United States at the invitation of John Joseph Hennessy, Bishop of Wichita, Kansas, in 1889, and within two years had opened four hospitals and an orphanage, as well as teaching in parish schools. The provincial motherhouse of the St. Clare of Assisi region, which takes in the United States and the Dominican Republic, is located in Oshkosh, Wisconsin.
