= Third Order of Saint Francis =

Tertiary religious order

The Third Order of Saint Francis, or Franciscan Tertiaries, is the third order of the Franciscan tradition of Christianity, founded by the medieval Italian Catholic friar St. Francis of Assisi.

Francis founded the Third Order, originally called the Brothers and Sisters of Penance, in 1221, to accommodate men and women who, either from already being in consecrated life as hermits, or from being married, were ineligible to join the Franciscan First or Second Orders, respectively. In this way, they could live their lives affiliated to the Franciscan vision of the Gospel.

The Order is divided into two different branches, each with its own Rule of Life:

1) The Third Order Secular, now called the Secular Franciscan Order, who belong to local fraternities. These members do not wear a religious habit, take promises rather than religious vows, and do not live in community, but gather together in fellowship on a regular basis. They can be married, single or clergy. They were the original third branch and were reorganized and renamed in 1978, with the approval of Pope Paul VI.

2) The friars and women religious of the Third Order Regular (TOR), who take religious vows and live in community. They grew out of the original third order and took on characteristics similar to the Franciscans of the first and second orders. The original TOR Franciscans have since spawned various TOR congregations, and others have been founded independently.

The Lutheran and Anglican traditions also have Franciscan Third Orders.

== History ==
Tertiaries (from the Latin tertiarius, relative to 'third'), or what are known as third orders, are those who live according to the third rule of religious orders, either inside or outside of a religious community. The idea which forms the basis of this institute is to allow those who cannot enter a religious order to enjoy the advantages and privileges of religious orders.

When the immediate disciples of Saint Francis had become an order bound by religious vows, it became necessary to provide for the great body of laity—married men and women who could not leave the world or abandon their avocations, but still were part of the Franciscan movement and desired to carry out its spirit and teaching. And so, around 1221, Francis drew up a rule for those of his followers who were debarred from being members of the Order of Friars Minor (OFM). At first they were called Brothers and Sisters of the Order of Penance, but later on, when the OFM was called the First Order and the Poor Clares the Second Order, the Order of Penance became the Third Order of St. Francis, whence the name Franciscan Tertiaries. According to the traditions of the Order, the original Rule was given by Francis in 1221 to a married couple, Luchesius Modestini and his wife, Buonadonna, who wished to follow him but did not feel called to separate as a married couple.

Francis was assisted by his friend Cardinal Ugolino di Conti (later Pope Gregory IX) in the creation of the order. Immediately on its establishment in 1221, the Third Order spread rapidly all over Italy and throughout western Europe. It embraced multitudes of men and women from all ranks of society. Everywhere it was connected closely with the First Order.

Because of the prohibition of bearing arms, the followers of this order came into conflict with local authorities and the feudal system of Italy, which customarily required men to carry arms for service in militias or for their lords. By the thirteenth century, local Third Order confraternities with variations had been established. In 1289, Pope Nicholas IV confirmed the religious order in the bull Supra montem, and put the Third Order under the care of the OFM.

The Third Order was created by Francis, and was the exemplar after which the others were fashioned. At an early date the other mendicant orders formed third orders of a similar nature, and so there came into being Dominican, Carmelite, Augustinian, Servite, Premonstratensian, and other tertiaries. These followed the same lines of development as the Franciscan Tertiaries.

By the fifteenth century, numerous individuals living under the Rule of the Third Order were living in small communities and leading eremitical lives. A papal decree of 1447 organized the more isolated communities into a new and separate religious order with its own rule of life, the Third Order Regular of Saint Francis of Penance. The Third Order became defined between the Third Order Regular (TOR; i.e. living under a Regula or Rule), and the Third Order Secular, for those members of the Order who lived in the world. The Rules of the various Third Orders have proved very adaptable to the needs of modern congregations devoted to active works of charity, so a great number of teaching and nursing congregations of women belonged to one or other of the Third Orders.

The Franciscan Third Order was always the principal one. In 1883, it received a great impetus and a renewed vogue from Pope Leo XIII in his approval of a new rule for the seculars. In 1901, Paul Sabatier published a Rule of Life of the Brothers and Sisters of Penance, which probably contained the substance of the original Rule of 1221, albeit with additions. It prescribed severe simplicity of dress and of life, abstinence, prayers and other religious exercises. It also forbade theatre attendance, the bearing of arms, and the taking of oaths except when administered by magistrates.

In the nineteenth century, many new congregations adopted the Rule of the Third Order without connection with the First Order. In 1978, Pope Paul VI caused the rules for regulars and seculars to be recast and made more suitable for the requirements of devout men and women of the time. The secular wing of the Order was renamed as the Secular Franciscan Order.

After the Reformation, Franciscan Third Orders aligned with the Lutheran Churches and Anglican Communion were organized, such as the Evangelical Franciscan Tertiaries (German: Evangelischen Franziskaner-Tertiaren), which was founded in 1927 by Friedrich Heiler, a Lutheran priest in Germany.

== Catholicism ==
=== Secular Franciscans ===
The Secular Franciscan Order (Ordo Franciscanus Saecularis in Latin), formerly the Third Order Secular, allows both laypeople and diocesan priests to join. A number of popes have also been members of this order. Members of the order are not required to live in religious community, but meet in community regularly. Professed members use the letters OFS after their name. Presently there are about 350,000 members worldwide.

The current rule was given by Paul VI in 1978 with the ecclesiastical letter Seraphicus Patriarcha to adapt the Secular Franciscan Order to twentieth-century needs. Under the new rule, the tertiaries of the Franciscan movement were set up as an autonomous order, with their own Minister General as head and became a fully recognized order within the Catholic Church. The order's name was changed from the Third Order Secular to the Secular Franciscan Order.

=== Third Order Regular ===
The origin of the Third Order Regular can be traced back to the second half of the thirteenth century. It was organized, in different forms, in the Netherlands, the south of France, Germany, and Italy. Some secular tertiaries, who in many cases had their house of meeting, gradually withdrew entirely from the world and formed religious communities, but without the three substantial vows of religious orders. Other religious associations such as the Beguines (women) and Beghards (men) in the Low Countries sometimes became third orders.

Throughout the fourteenth century, the regular tertiaries of both sexes had in most cases no common organization; only in the following century did well-ordered religious communities with solemn vows and a common head develop, such as the Third Order Regular of Saint Francis of Penance. Pope Martin V submitted in 1428 all tertiaries, regular and secular, to the direction of the Minister General of the OFM, but this disposition was soon revoked by his successor Pope Eugene IV. Pope Leo X, to introduce uniformity into the numerous congregations, gave a new form to the rule in 1521. It retained the rule as published by Nicholas IV all that could serve the purpose, but added new points, such as the three solemn vows and insisting on subjection to the First Order of St. Francis. For this last disposition the Rule of Leo X was met with resistance, and never was accepted by some congregations.

More than 448 congregations profess the "Rule and Life of the Brothers and Sisters of the Third Order Regular of St. Francis." There are 18 male congregations of Tertiary Franciscans, 370 congregations of Franciscan Sisters and 60 monasteries of cloistered nuns. The Third Order congregations of men and women number over 200,000.

A new rule, written by friars and sisters of various congregations, was approved by Pope Paul VI in 1978. It is the current rule followed by all TOR congregations.

==== Congregations of friars ====
It was not until the fifteenth century that there developed single, well-ordered religious communities with solemn vows and a common head. In the fifteenth century there were numerous independent male congregations of regular tertiaries with the three vows in Italy, Dalmatia, Spain, Portugal, France, Germany, and the Netherlands.

The Obregonians, or the Minim Congregation of Poor Brothers Infirmarians, were a small Spanish congregation of men dedicated to the nursing care of the sick. The congregation ceased to exist around the time of the Peninsular War.

===== Germany =====
The Congregation of the Brothers of the Poor of St. Francis was founded on December 25, 1857, at Aachen, Germany by John Hoever for the protection and education of poor, homeless boys. In 1866 it was introduced in the United States, and through the generosity of Sarah Worthington Peter, orphanages for boys were established in Teutopolis, Illinois; Detroit, Michigan; Cincinnati, Ohio (1868); and Cold Spring, Kentucky (1869). The order's motherhouse remains in Aachen and maintains houses in Brazil, the Netherlands, and the US.

The Franciscan Brothers of the Holy Cross (FFSC) were founded by James Wirth in 1862 in Hausen, Germany, to care for orphans, the poor, the sick, and the suffering. In 1891, three Brothers settled in Bad Kreuznach, where they eventually took over a local hospital, now known as St. Marienwörth. The Brothers were invited to come to the Diocese of Springfield, Illinois, US in 1928 to establish a monastery and a trade school. St. Joseph's motherhouse is in Hausen.

===== Poland =====
Founded in Poland in 1888, the Franciscan Missionary Brothers of the Sacred Heart of Jesus focuses on medical care. They established a long-term medical care facility near St. Louis, Missouri, US in 1927 to extend their service. As of 2002, the brothers numbered 22.

===== Spain =====
The Capuchin Tertiary Friars of Our Lady of Sorrows, more commonly known as the Amigonian Friars, were founded in Spain in 1889 by Capuchin friar (later bishop) Luis Amigó y Ferrer. They were established through Amigó's desire to help the young boys he saw caught up in the Spanish penal system. They soon established reform schools and trade schools to help these boys. In 1986 they took over the administration of two youth facilities in San Juan, Puerto Rico.

===== Ireland =====
In 1835 a Franciscan monastery was built in Roundstone, County Galway, Ireland. In 1858, Bishop John Loughlin issued an invitation to the Brothers of the monastery to operate schools for the boys of the Diocese of Brooklyn.

==== Congregations of Sisters ====
There were also congregations of religious sisters of the Third Order. For instance, the Grey Sisters of the Third Order, serving in hospitals, spread in France and the Netherlands. In 1403, Elizabeth of Reute and several other young women who were Franciscan tertiaries, under the guidance of Konrad Kügelin, provost of the Canonry of St. Peter in Waldsee, acquired a house in Reute on the outskirts of Waldsee. This community was a proto-monastery of the Order, as tertiaries of the mendicant orders had not yet been allowed to profess vows.

Angeline of Marsciano is generally credited with the founding of the Third Order Regular for women around 1403, as her religious congregation was the first Franciscan community of women living under the rule of the Third Order Regular authorized by Pope Nicholas V.

Whilst Pope Leo X, in the reform of the TOR rule, had left it free to the congregations to adopt papal enclosures or not, Pius V (1568) prescribed it to all convents of tertiary sisters with solemn vows. Still, this order was not carried out everywhere. In this regard the custom prevailed that the Friars Minor refused to take the direction of those convents which had only episcopal enclosure. Besides the aforementioned, there were different offshoots of the Sisters of Saint Elizabeth in Austria, Germany, the Netherlands, and France (there, under the name of Soeurs du Refuge, some of them still exist). The first Ursulines, also, founded by St. Angela Merici (1540), belonged to the Third Order.

The history of the Third Order of St. Francis had a range of organizational models. Some monasteries were established to pursue the purely contemplative life, usually in an urban setting; others communities of women did not embrace the enclosure, but considered active works of charity, tending to the poor and sick, as part of their Franciscan charism. In the nineteenth century many of the new congregations adopted the Rule of the Third Order, but most of them have no connection with the First Order. As to their activities, almost all dedicate themselves to works of charity, either in hospitals, homes, or ateliers; others work in schools, not a few are in foreign missions.

===== Colombia =====
- The Franciscan Missionary Sisters of Mary Help of Sinners was founded in 1888 in Ecuador by Maria Bernarda Bütler. In 1895, due to anti-religious sentiment, the congregation relocated to Cartagena, Colombia. They are also active in Brazil and Lichtenstein.
- The Franciscan Sisters of Mary Immaculate was founded in Colombia in 1893 by Swiss missionary Maria Josefa Karolina Brader. Introduced to the US in 1932, the Sisters combine social service with Perpetual Adoration of the Blessed Sacrament. They serve in Texas, California and New Mexico. The provincial motherhouse is in Amarillo, Texas.

===== France =====
- The Franciscans Servants of Mary was founded by Marie Virginie Vaslin in 1852. Approved by Louis-Théophile Pallu du Parc, Bishop of Blois, in France, March 25, 1856. It integrated into the Franciscan family and adopted the Rule of the Third Order Regular on September 17, 1864. The congregation was elevated to the rank of pontifical right on December 17, 1901. The sisters are active in France, England, Italy, India, Madagascar, and Chad.
- The Franciscan Sisters of Calais were founded in 1854. In 1911, Bishop Cornelius Van de Ven requested sisters to come and open a hospital in Alexandria, Louisiana, US. Mother Marie de Bethanie Crowley with five companions arrived in central Louisiana and established their first foundation, a sanitarium in Pineville. They went on to found several medical facilities: St. Francis Hospital in Monroe, Our Lady of Lourdes in Lafayette, Our Lady of the Lake Hospital in Baton Rouge and St. Elizabeth Hospital in Gonzales. In 1964 they changed their name to the Franciscan Missionaries of Our Lady to reflect their expansion into other areas of the world. The North American provincial motherhouse is in Baton Rouge.

===== Germany =====
- The Franciscan Sisters of Dillingen was founded in Bavaria. The sisters are active in Germany, Brazil, Spain, India, and the US in a variety of ministries.
- In 1845, Frances Schervier founded the Poor Sisters of St. Francis at Aachen. In 1868, sisters from Germany came to the US, establishing medical centers in New York City, New Jersey and Ohio to serve the needs of the large German emigrant communities. In 1959, the American provinces of the congregation were separated from the German motherhouse to become an independent congregation under the name Franciscan Sisters of the Poor (SFP), headquartered in Brooklyn, New York.
- The Hospital Sisters of St. Francis was founded in Telgte, Germany by Father Christoph Bernsmeyer in 1847. The general motherhouse is in Münster. They arrived in the US in 1875 and established St. John's Hospital in Springfield, Illinois.
- The Congregation of the Sisters of Saint Elizabeth (CSSE)was founded by Maria Merkert in Prussia in 1850.
- In 1855 Paul Joseph Nardini founded the Franciscan Sisters of the Holy Family in Pirmasens, in the Rhineland-Palatinate.
- The Franciscan Servants of the Holy Child Jesus were founded in 1855 in Oberzell, Germany, by Antonia Werr to minister to the needs of women who were neglected by society; in particular, prisoners, prostitutes and the destitute poor. The Sisters came to the US in 1929 and established their first foundation on Staten Island, New York. Their principal ministries are in social work, health care and teaching. The provincial motherhouse is in Plainfield, New Jersey.

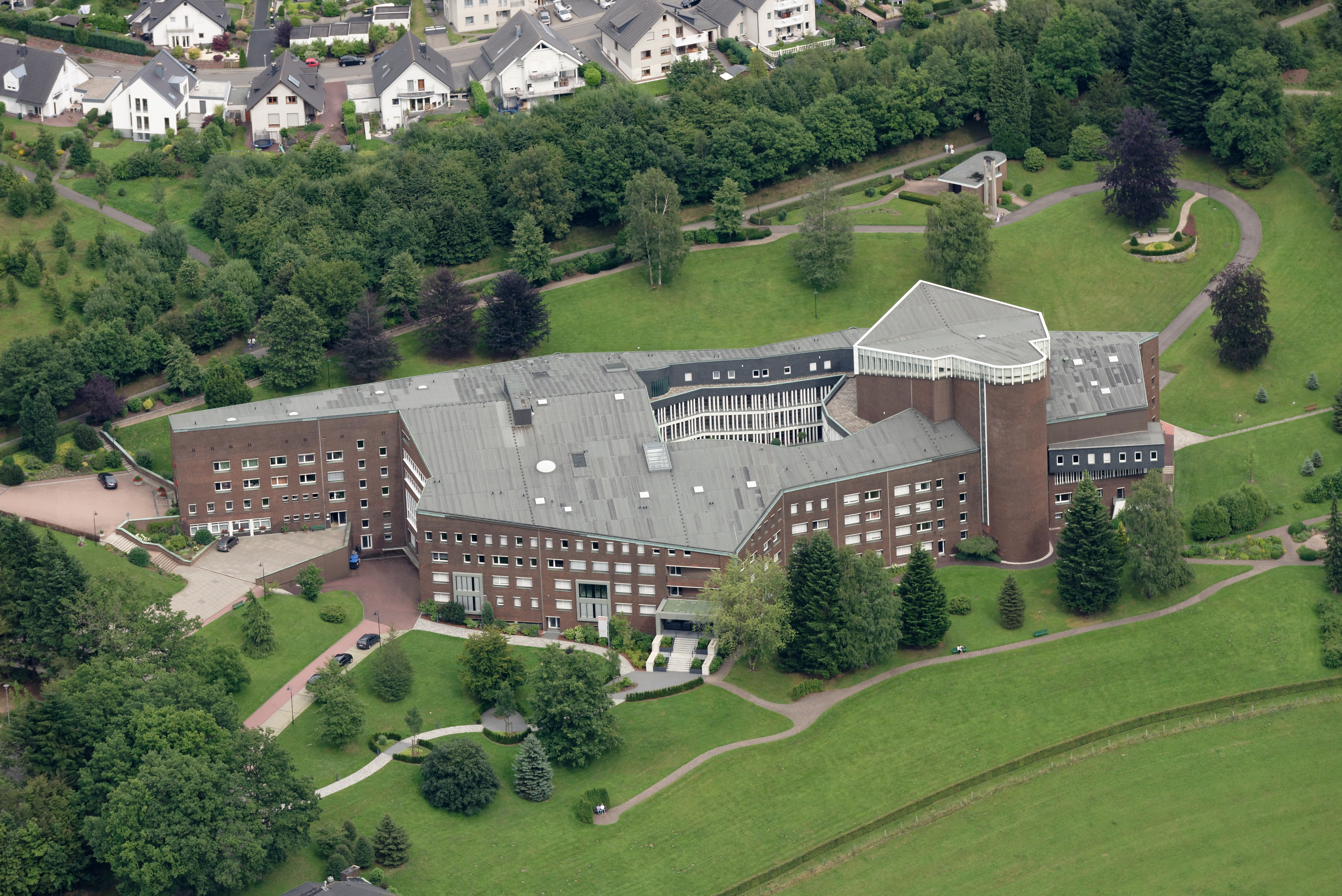
Olpe Franziskanerinnen-Mutterhaus

- The Sisters of St. Francis of Perpetual Adoration was originally founded in Olpe, Germany in 1863 by Maria Theresia Bonzel as the Poor Sisters of St. Francis Seraph of the Perpetual Adoration. Introduced into the US in 1875, the St. Joseph Province is based at Mount St. Francis in Colorado Springs, Colorado.
- The Sisters of St. Francis of the Martyr St. George was founded in 1869 in Thuine, Germany. Its St. Elizabeth Province in the US began in 1923 when five sisters were sent at the request of Father Dunne, of St. Louis, Missouri, then a center of German immigration. The Sisters moved to Alton, where they established Saint Anthony's Infirmary, a residence for the elderly. As of 2010, there are over 100 Sisters in the US (the total congregation numbers more than 1,600). They operate facilities for elderly care for both the general public and also with special facilities for the clergy, as well as child care and education. The provincial motherhouse is in Alton, Illinois.

===== India =====
The Franciscan Missionaries of Mary was founded in 1877 in Ootacamund, India, by Hélène de Chappotin de Neuville. As of 2016, there are almost 8,300 sisters in 75 countries, including Canada, England, Scotland, and the US. In the US, they sponsor the Cardinal Hayes Home in Millbrook, New York, for developmentally challenged individuals.

===== Ireland =====
The Franciscan Missionary Sisters for Africa was founded in 1952 by Mary Kevin of the Sacred Passion (born Theresa Kearney, County Wicklow, Ireland). It was intended as an offshoot from the Mill Hill Sisters, with the purpose of focusing on the African missions. The sisters work in Uganda, Kenya, Zambia, Zimbabwe, South Sudan, the US, Ireland and Scotland. A convent was established in Boston, Massachusetts, in 1952, with an American novitiate being opened in 1954. The Generalate is in Dublin, Ireland.

===== Italy =====
- The Tertiary Sisters of St. Francis was founded by Maria Hueber in 1700 in Blixen in the Tyrol. Over 480 sisters work in education, nursing, elder care, and orphanages in Italy, Austria, Bolivia, and Cameroon.
- The Franciscan Sisters, Daughters of the Sacred Hearts of Jesus and Mary were founded in Olpe, Germany, in 1860 by Mother Clara Pfaender to care for the sick poor. They came to the US in 1872 in response to a request for medical care for the German immigrant community of St. Louis, Missouri. Five Sisters were sent in 1875 to add to the fledgling mission, but all perished in a much-noted shipwreck commemorated by Gerard Manley Hopkins in the poem "The Wreck of the Deutschland". The sisters established hospitals, schools, orphanages and other fields of ministry. They sponsor Wheaton Franciscan Healthcare. The international congregational office is in Rome. The American provincial motherhouse is in Wheaton, Illinois.
- The Congregation of the Franciscan Missionary Sisters of the Sacred Heart (FMSC) was founded in 1861 in Gemona del Friuli, Udine, Italy, by Gregory Fioravanti, inspired by and with the collaboration of Lady Laura Laroux, Duchess of Bauffremont. In 1865, at the request of the Franciscan Fathers, three Sisters came to the parish of St. Francis of Assisi in New York City to serve the immigrants, orphans, and poor. As of 2022, there was 560 professed sisters in twenty-one countries. The General House is in Rome.
- The general motherhouse of the Sisters of the Sorrowful Mother is in Rome. It was founded in 1883 by inspiration of the founder of the Salvatorians, and became independent in 1885. They came to the US at the invitation of the Bishop of Wichita, Kansas, in 1889, and within two years had opened four hospitals and an orphanage, as well as teaching in parish schools. Today the Sisters of the Sorrowful Mother serve in Italy, Austria, Brazil, the Dominican Republic, Germany, the US, Grenada, St. Lucia, Tanzania, and Trinidad and Tobago.

===== Netherlands =====
The Sisters of St. Francis of Penance and Christian Charity is an international congregation founded in 1835 in Heythuysen, Netherlands, by Catherine Damen (Mother Magdalen) to care for neglected children. Sisters from its German province arrived in New York City in 1874 at the request of the German Jesuits of St. Michael's parish in Buffalo, New York, where there was a great need for German-speaking sisters to teach the young of the expanding German population on Buffalo's east side. In 1939, the North American province was divided into three separate provinces. Since 1992, the three US provinces have sponsored a mission in Palenque, Chiapas, Mexico.

===== Philippines =====
The Franciscan Apostolic Sisters were founded in 1953 by Gerardo Filipetto to assist the missionary Franciscan friars in their work of spreading the Gospel and caring for the poor and the sick. They established a community in the Diocese of Lincoln, Nebraska, in 1992, and later in Illinois and Rhode Island. The motherhouse is in Cagayan, Philippines.

===== Poland =====
The Congregation of the Sisters of Saint Elizabeth (CSSE) was founded by Maria Merkert in Prussian Silesia in 1850.

The Congregation of Sisters of St. Felix of Cantalice Third Order Regular of St. Francis of Assisi (CSSF), with general motherhouse in Kraków, Poland, was founded in 1855 by Sophia Truszkowska in Warsaw, then within the Russian Empire. There are 1800 sisters, 700 of whom serve in the North American Province. Other provinces are based in Kraków, Przemyśl, Warsaw, and Curitiba, Brazil. The congregation was introduced in the US in 1874 in Livonia, Michigan; Buffalo, New York (1900); Chicago, Illinois (1910); Lodi, New Jersey (1913); Coraopolis, Pennsylvania (1920); Enfield, Connecticut (1932); and Rio Rancho, New Mexico (1953). These locations amalgamated to form the Province of Our Lady of Hope based in Beaver Falls, Pennsylvania. This province has 700 professed sisters who serve from Canada's Northwest Territories to Haiti.

===== Portugal =====
The Congregation of the Franciscan Hospitaller Sisters of the Immaculate Conception was founded in Lisbon, Portugal, in 1871 by Libânia do Carmo Galvão Mexia de Moura Telles de Albuquerque (Sr. Maria Clara), and is represented in fifteen countries. They came to the US in 1960 in order to aid Portuguese immigrants. They serve in California in the dioceses of San Jose, Fresno, and Monterey. The majority of the California sisters are involved in healthcare. The motherhouse is in Lisbon.

===== Switzerland =====
The Sisters of Mercy of the Holy Cross were founded in Switzerland in 1856 by Capuchin friar Theodosius Florentini and Maria Katherina Scherer. A congregation that specialized in healthcare, they came to the US in 1912. In 1923 they were invited to Merrill, Wisconsin. The sisters work primarily in Wisconsin and Louisiana. The general motherhouse is in Ingenbohl, Switzerland.

===== Uganda =====
The Little Sisters of St. Francis was founded in 1923 by Mill Hill Sister Mary Kevin Kearney. They work in Uganda, Kenya, and Zambia. The motherhouse is in Nkokonjeru, where they manage St. Francis Hospital Nkokonjeru.

===== United Kingdom =====
- The Franciscan Missionary Sisters of Little Hampton (FMSL) is a diocesan congregation founded in 1911 by Mary Patrick Brennan. Besides missions in Peru and India, the sisters operate two residential care homes in West Sussex, UK, and a house of hospitality in Knock, Ireland.
- The Franciscan Sisters of the Immaculate Conception (more commonly known as the Franciscan Sisters of Glasgow) were founded in Glasgow, Scotland in 1847 by Sisters Adelaide Vaast and Veronica Cordier from the Franciscan Monastery of Our Lady of the Angels, in Tourcoing, France. It was organized in response to a request from Peter Forbes for sisters to teach the poor children of the parishes. Besides their work in education, the sisters are involved in parish ministry, social work, and health care in Scotland, England, Ireland, the US, Italy, Nigeria, and Kenya. In 1865, Pamfilo of Magliano adapted their rule for the then-recently-established Franciscan Sisters of Allegany, New York.
- The Sisters of the Holy Cross Menzingen is a Swiss foundation established in 1844 by Capuchin Theodosius Florentini and Maria Heimgartner (Mother Bernarda). In 1902, the sisters came to England where they opened a school in Wimbledon. They operate Holy Cross Preparatory School for girls in Kingston, but have also expanded their ministry beyond education. The provincial house is in New Malden, London.
- The Franciscan Sisters of the Immaculate Conception and St. Francis was founded by Mary Elizabeth Lockhart in Greenwich, London, in 1852. In 1857, the community moved to Bayswater, and in 1896 to Bocking, Essex, where they operated a day school, an orphanage, and later a nursing home. In 1965, the congregation amalgamated with the Missionary Franciscan Sisters of the Immaculate Conception, founded by Elizabeth Hayes (1823–1894) who was later known as Mother Mary Ignatius of Jesus. The motherhouse was transferred to Rome.
- The Franciscan Missionary Sisters of St. Joseph (FMSJ) were founded in 1883 by Alice Ingham and companions. With the motherhouse at Mill Hill, London, they are more commonly known as the Mill Hill Sisters. In the Diocese of Salford, they serve in various ministries including Caritas and the Cornerstone Day Center. The sisters also serve in Kenya, Uganda, the Netherlands, Ireland, Ecuador, and the US. The congregation was introduced into the US in 1952.
- The Franciscan Missionaries of the Divine Motherhood (FMDM) were founded in 1884 in Hampstead, London, by three members of the Third Order, and began caring for orphans in Aldershot. The international congregation has about 300 members. The motherhouse is at Ladywell in Surrey.

== Lutheranism ==
=== Lutheran Franciscan Tertiaries ===
In Germany, the Lutheran Franciscan Tertiaries, officially known as the Evangelische Franziskanerbruderschaft der Nachfolge Christi, were founded in 1927; they emphasize the Rule of Saint Francis and pray daily from their breviary.

== See also ==
- Category:Members of the Third Order of Saint Francis
- Franciscan Missionaries of Christ the King
- Franciscan spirituality in Protestantism
- List of congregations of the Franciscan Third Order Regular in the United States
- Association of the Christian faithful

== Books ==
- Raffaele Pazzelli. St. Francis and the Third Order: The Franciscan and pre-Franciscan Penitential Movement, Franciscan Institute Publications, 1989; ISBN 978-0-8199-0953-4
