= Franciscan Brothers of the Holy Cross =

Religious congregation

The Franciscan Brothers of the Holy Cross (Latin: Fratres Franciscani Santi Crucis, abbreviated as F.F.S.C. after the names of its members) are a congregation of Religious Brothers of the Franciscan Third Order Regular who were founded by Brother James Wirth in Hausen, Germany, on 12 June 1862. They were founded to answer a call to care for orphans, the poor, the sick and the suffering.

== Foundation ==
The founder was born Peter Wirth on 15 October 1830 in Niederbreitbach, Germany, the youngest of four children. He lost his father at the age of ten, only to lose his mother as well the following year. He was then taken in by an uncle with whom he lived until he was 19 years old. He was apprenticed and taught the trade of shoemaker, being declared a Master craftsman at the age of 24. During this time, he was introduced to the Third Order of St. Francis and became a member.

Feeling called to lead a more religious life, Wirth, along with two other young men, organized a small religious community intended for manual laborers. It soon fell apart, however. Led from this experience, though, in 1862 Wirth sought and received permission from the Bishop of the Diocese of Trier to establish a religious community. This foundation took place on 12 June of that same year, in the Chapel of the Holy Cross in Hausen, when, with some other young men, he professed religious vows, and he took the name 'Brother James (German: Jakobus).

The young community of Brothers immediately embarked on a program of caring for the poor and the sick of the region. Brother James led the community as its first Superior General, but also shared in the caring of the needy. As a result, he died only nine years after the foundation of his community, on 28 March 1871, at the age of forty. He died from smallpox, which he contracted from a patient with this disease whom he had been nursing. His remains were later placed in the Chapel of St. Joseph at the Motherhouse in Hausen.

== Expansion ==
In Germany, the Brothers continued in the field of nursing and care of the needy of that same diocese. In 1891, three Brothers settled in Bad Kreuznach, where they eventually took over a local hospital, now known as St. Marienwörth.

In 1924, the Brothers went to the United States to establish an orphanage in New Orleans. In 1928, however, Bishop James Aloysius Griffin of the Diocese of Springfield, Illinois, invited the Brothers to establish a community there. They built St. James Monastery and, with the help of ten Brothers from Germany, opened a trade school for young men, which school was in operation from 1930 to 1972. At present they also work in Missouri and Wisconsin. They currently operate Brother James Court, a residential intermediate care facility for men with developmental disabilities in Springfield, Illinois.

As of 2024 there were thirty members in five houses. The Motherhouse of the Congregation remains in Hausen, Germany.

On 12 June 2024, Brother Michael Ruedin was elected Superior General of the congregation.
