= FMSJ =

FMSJ may refer to:

- Manja Airport in Madagascar
- The Franciscan Missionaries of St. Joseph, a Catholic religious institute
