= Tertiary Sisters of St. Francis =

The Tertiary Sisters of St. Francis is a congregation of Roman Catholic religious sisters of the Third Order of St. Francis which was founded by Venerable Maria Hueber in 1700 in Brixen, Italy, in the South Tyrol. Their international motherhouse is in Rome.

== History ==
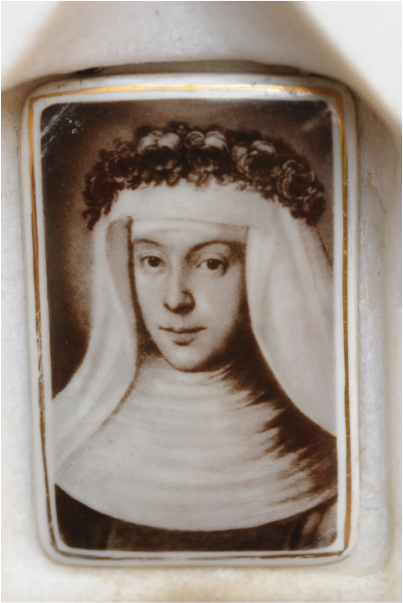
Ven. Maria Hueber

Maria Hueber was born May 22, 1653, in Brixen. The youngest of five children, she worked for a time as a nanny and as a housekeeper in neighboring towns to help support her widowed mother. Hueber returned to Brixen to care for her ill and elderly mother; there she joined the Third Order of St. Francis. Her mother died in 1696.

Her spiritual director, Isidor Kirnigl OFM told Hueber of a community of sisters he had met while in Rome, who were dedicated to teaching poor girls. With Kirnigl encouragement, in September 1700 she started the first free girls' school in Tyrol in Brixen. She and a companion, Regina Pfurner, began to live a religious life according to the Rule of the Franciscan Third Order Regular. Gradually, they were joined by other young women.

A second foundation was made in 1712 in Bolzano; another in Kaltern an der Weinstraße in 1723, and eventually throughout the Tyrol. In 1924 the first sisters traveled from Kaltern to a mission in Bolivia. Initially the separate foundations were independent sister communities. In 1929 they merged to form "Congregation of the Tertiary Sisters of St. Francis". In 1956, the congregation was made an Institute of Pontifical Right.

== Present day ==
As of 2021, there are over 480 sisters in four provinces: Italy, Austria, Bolivia, and Cameroon. The Generalate is in Rome.

== Italy ==
Besides ministries in teaching, nursing, elder care, and embroidery, the Brixen Provincial Motherhouse has a Christkindl workshop that has been making and repairing, according to the traditional methods, wax Christkindl figures for over 160 years.

== Cameroon ==
The Cameroon Province was established when five Sisters were sent from Italy in response to a request for help by the Mill Hill Fathers working in that country. The Sisters ranged in age from 18 to 70. They arrived in Douala on October 16, 1935, where they were met by Fr. Franz Figl, M.H.M. After resting, the missionary band set out for Shisong, traveling first by train as far as Nkongsamba, and the rest of the trip by car.

Finding that a major bridge had been washed away by torrential rains, the Sisters were given hospitality by the Catholic populace of Babessi. They continued to Shisong, finally arriving at their destination and formally establishing their mission on April 8, 1936. The Sisters were later to return to Babessi and establish a number of services for the people of that region.

Today the Province numbers over 200 Sisters, who work in many fields of service, from medical care to nursing homes to social services. The Sisters formed a relationship in A.D. 2000 with three congregations of Franciscan Sisters in the United States, who had developed from one community and were looking for ways to mark their common sesquicentennial of foundation. They created what they call the "Common Venture" in which the American Sisters mentor the Africans on ways to better their spiritual and professional development.

In 2008, the Province established its own mission to assist the Roman Catholic Diocese of Lafia in Nigeria.

=== Apostolates ===
Teaching, Pastoral and Social Services, Orphanages, Office Management, and Catering
