= Obregonian Brothers =

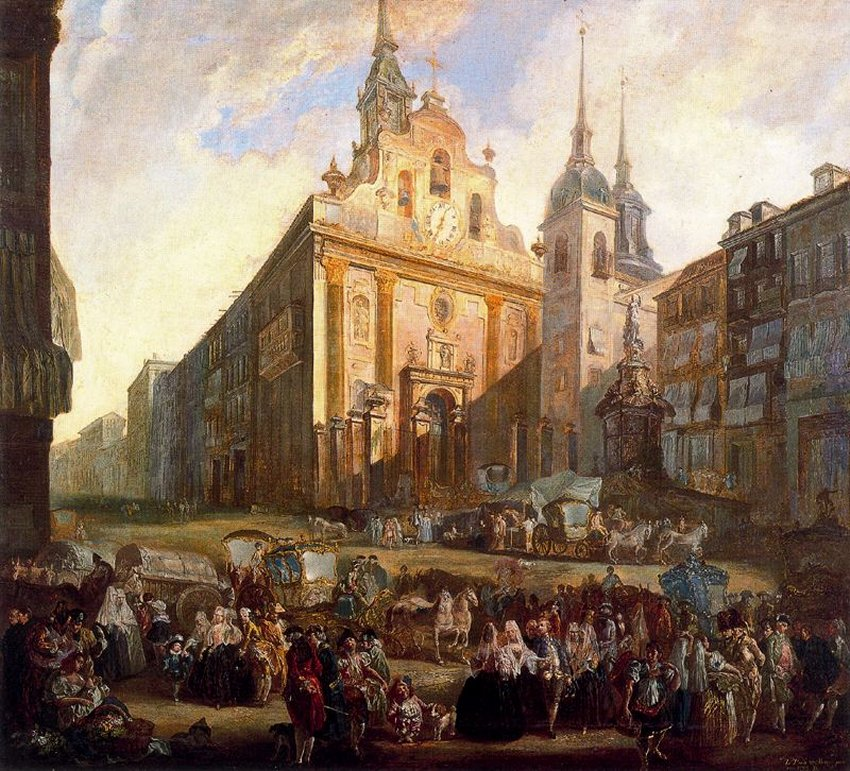
The motherhouse of the Poor Brothers Infirmarians on the right, on the Puerta del Sol in Madrid, by Luis Paret y Alcázar (1773)

The Obregonians, or the Minim Congregation of Poor Brothers Infirmarians, were a small Roman Catholic congregation of men dedicated to the nursing care of the sick, who professed the Rule of the Third Order Regular of St. Francis.

== Bernardino de Obregón ==
Bernardino de Obregón was born into the minor nobility on 5 May 1540, at Las Huelgas near Burgos, Spain. Orphaned at a young age, he came under the protection of Bishop Fernando Niño. After the bishop's death in 1522, Obregon enlisted in the army. He served in Italy, Flanders, and at the Battle of St. Quentin (1557). In recognition of the courage shown in the campaign, Philip II of Spain appointed him a knight of the Order of Saint James.

Obregón married Catalina de Pareja, (daughter of Antón de Pareja, alcaide of Zambrana y Rute and of María Díez). Around 1566 he entered the Third Order of Francis of Paola, the Minims. He died 6 August 1599 at the Hospital of Our Lady of the Annunciation in Madrid during a plague epidemic. Originally buried at Annunciation Hospital, his remains were later transferred to the chapel at the cemetery of Santa Maria.

== History ==
In 1566, on the Calle de Postas in Madrid, a sweeper dirtied Obregón's uniform and outraged, Obregón slapped him. The humble attitude of the sweeper, asking for forgiveness, moved his spirit so much that he decided to leave his position and devote himself to the care of the sick in the Hospital de San Andrés (Hospital Real de la Corte), which was then located next to the Puerta del Sol in Madrid.

After a while, a large number of people followed his example, taking charge of caring for the sick. For this reason, in 1567, he founded a congregation to serve hospitals. The congregation took the name of the "Minim Congregation of the Poor Nursing Brothers" and in 1569 it was approved by the pope's nuncio, Decio Carafa. To the three ordinary religious vows was added that of free hospitality.

In 1579, at the request of King Philip II, he founded the Hospital de Santa Ana, which was maintained with the alms they obtained by begging on the streets of Madrid. In 1587, King Philip II united all the hospitals of the town into one, and on July 24 of that year the General Hospital of the Carrera de San Jerónimo was inaugurated.

Obregón was invited to Lisbon in 1592, where he founded an asylum for orphan boys. On September 8, 1596, the General Hospital of Our Lady of the Annunciation was established near the Puerta de Atocha and the Carrera de San Jerónimo hospital was moved there. He assisted King Philip in his last illness in 1598.

Obregón traveled through Spain and Portugal founding and reorganizing hospitals. He spent 20 years working in various hospitals in the city, and became the director of the General Hospital of the city. During this time, he developed insights into the effective care of the sick, which he went on to pass on to the men who joined him. He wrote the work Instruction of the Sick and Consolation to the Afflicted and true practice of how to apply the remedies taught to doctors, published in Madrid in 1607.

The congregation spread in Spain and its dependencies, in Belgium and the Indies. The motherhouse was at the Convent of Our Lady of Victory on the Puerta del Sol in Madrid, adjacent to the Church of Our Lady of Good Success. This had been founded as the hospital for the Royal Court in 1529, when the Emperor Charles V decreed that this facility was no longer to move about the country with the court but was to be established at this site. It was entrusted to the care of the Brothers by King Philip II. Both structures were demolished in the 19th century, in the course of renovating the plaza.

Pope Paul V, in 1609, allowed the Obregonians to wear a black cross on the left side of the breast over the grey religious habit of the Third Order of St. Francis, to distinguish them from similar congregations. In 1617, an Obregonian Brother, Andrés Fernández, published the first manual of nursing care developed by and intended for nurses, Training Nurses and a Method for applying Remedies to all Forms of Illness (Spanish: Instrucción de Enfermeros y método de aplicar los remedios a todo tipo de enfermedades).

Since the French occupation of Spain they have entirely disappeared. Streets in Madrid and Barcelona remain named for Obregón.
