= Peter Wirth =

Peter Wirth may refer to:

- James Wirth (Peter Wirth, 1830–1871), German Catholic Religious Brother
- Peter Wirth (politician) (born 1961), member of the New Mexico Senate
