= Amigonian Friars =

Religious institute of men founded in Spain

Capuchin Tertiary Religious of Our Lady of Sorrows
- Fratres Tertii Ordinis Sancti Francisci Capulatorum a Beata Virgine Perdolente
- Abbreviation: TC
- Nickname: Amigonian Friars
- Formation: April 12, 1889; 137 years ago
- Founder: Fr. Luis José María Amigó y Ferrer, O.F.M. Cap.
- Founded at: Massamagrell, Valencia, Spain
- Type: Clerical Religious Congregation of Pontifical Right for men
- Headquarters: Via Bernardo Blumenstihl 28/36, 00135 Roma, Italy
- Members: 358 members (includes 178 priests) as of 2020
- Countries present: North and South America, Spain, Germany, Poland, Ivory Coast, Caribbean
- Superior General: Fr. Frank Gerardo Pérez Alvarado, TC
- Ministry: Care of young boys who are juvenile delinquents and drug addicts
- Parent organization: Roman Catholic Church

The Amigonian Friars, officially named the Capuchin Tertiary Religious of Our Lady of Sorrows (Latin: Fratres Tertii Ordinis Sancti Francisci Capulatorum a Beata Virgine Perdolente), abbreviated TC is a Catholic clerical religious congregation of Pontifical Right for men founded in Spain during the 19th century which specializes in working with young boys facing issues of juvenile delinquency and drug addiction. They follow the Rule of the Third Order Regular of St. Francis.

== Foundation ==
José María Amigó y Ferrer was born in Massamagrell (Valencia - Spain) on October 17, 1854. As a student at the Theological Seminary, he would volunteer at various hospitals. In 1874, he joined a Capuchin monastery located in the city of Bayonne, with the name of Fray Luis de Masamagrell. He was ordained in March 1879 at the friary of Montehano de Escalante in Santander, Spain.

In 1885 he founded a religious institute of women, called the Capuchin Tertiary Sisters of the Holy Family. This was followed in 1889 by the friars. The friars were founded by Bishop Luis Amigó Ferrer, O.F.M. Cap., (1854 - 1934) on April 12,1889, in Massamagrell, in the Province of Valencia, Spain. Amigó, a Capuchin friar, had a ministry of service to the prisons. In the course of this work, he frequently found boys, even pre-teenagers, locked up as prisoners, due to the poverty of their families. He wanted to give these boys the support they needed to break out of this cycle of poverty.

To this end, Amigó established the friars to provide institutions of care and training for poor boys. The first group of 19 novices for the new institute made their first religious profession on June 24, 1890. They established several reform schools and orphanages. Early in their history, the friars developed a particular program of education for their schools, which they term "Amigonian Pedagogy". It is based on the Gospels, having as its principal models the images of the Good Shepherd, the lost sheep and the Good Samaritan. Its goal is "the re-education, rehabilitation, correction and reform of children and youth who, for diverse factors, have come into conflict with themselves and with society.

== Spirituality ==
The friars follow a spirituality based in the vision of St. Francis of Assisi, given to them by their founder, a Capuchin Friar Minor. They also model themselves on the role of Our Lady of Sorrows, who stood at the foot of the Cross, sharing her son's agony and love for the world. She is a model to the friars of the generosity, mercy, strength and tenderness needed in the mission of serving their charges.

== Apostolate ==
The friars run a children's home in Santa Cruz, Bolivia. There is also a group of laypeople who support and work with the Amigonian Friars and Religious Sisters. Young people are organized to help in the mission of the institute into Amigonian Youth. Together all these various fruits of the work of Amigó form the "Amigonian Family".

== Martyrs ==
During the Spanish Civil War, the institutions of the friars throughout Spain were closed by various militias associated with the Second Spanish Republic. Many of the friars were arrested, and 19 were executed in various locations throughout the country during the summer of 1936. They are honored as martyrs for the Catholic faith and have been declared venerable by the Catholic Church.

== Presence ==
The friars today serve on four continents, and in the Philippines. In Spain, they run about 20 institutions of education and social service. Outside of Spain there is one community each in Ivory Coast and Poland, with another two communities in Germany.

Communities of friars also serve throughout the Americas, from the United States and Mexico and throughout South America and in the Caribbean. The general motherhouse is located in Rome, Italy.
