= James Wirth =

Founder of the Franciscan Brothers of the Holy Cross

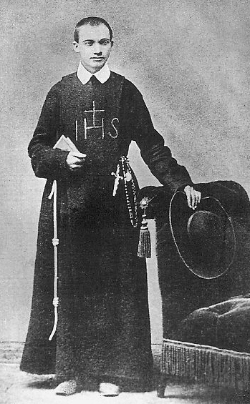
Brother James Wirth, F.F.S.C., founder of the Franciscan Brothers of the Holy Cross

Brother James Wirth, F.F.S.C., (German: Bruder Jakobus, 15 October 1830 – 28 March 1871) was a German Catholic Religious Brother who founded the religious congregation of the Franciscan Brothers of the Holy Cross. They are dedicated to the care of disadvantaged youth, especially orphans, primarily through providing vocational training to help them lead successful lives as adults.

== Early life ==
He was born Peter Wirth in the town of Niederbreitbach, then in the Rhine Province of the Kingdom of Prussia, on 15 October 1830, the fourth child of Theodor Wirth and Katharina Andries. His father was a shepherd while his mother ran a small pub. He lost his father at the age of nine and his mother a year later. Because of this tragedy, the impoverished children were separated, and Wirth was raised by his uncle and godfather, Johann Peter Andries, who was a teacher in the local school.

Although his uncle eventually made Peter his assistant at the school, for financial reasons Peter could not attend a school for teachers to enter that profession. He started, instead, an apprenticeship as a shoemaker in the workshop of Johann Schmitz, where he also lived (now James Wirth-Straße 19). He produced his masterpiece as a shoemaker at the age of 24, earning the rank of Master craftsman.

== Religious life ==
Wirth was a pious young man. While still working at his trade, he joined the Third Order of Saint Francis, whose members were active in addressing the social and religious needs of the region. He felt drawn, however, to lead a spiritual and prayerful life. To this end, after he had completed his apprenticeship, he and two friends founded a house of "pious craftsmen" in the summer of 1854. This attempt failed and the small group dispersed.

Wirth, however, persisted with his call and found other young men who shared his vision of answering the needs of the helpless in their society. They nourished, educated and trained orphan boys, as well as cared for the sick. On 12 June 1862, with the approval of the Bishop of Trier, they formed the Franciscan Brothers of the Holy Cross in the rural Chapel of the Cross (German: Kreuzkapelle) in the nearby town of Waldbreitbach. The motherhouse of the new congregation, St. Joseph Monastery, was built in the town of Hausen in 1866.

While caring for smallpox patients, Wirth himself became infected and died on 28 March 1871. Today his remains are kept in the chapel of St. Joseph Monastery in Hausen.

== Legacy ==
The Franciscan Brothers of the Holy Cross are presently engaged in various ministries that meet the needs of people in various ways. They work in health care settings, and provide homes for the developmentally disabled. In addition to the original motherhouse in Hausen, they operate a well-known hospital in Bad Kreuznach. The Brothers are also teachers and hospital chaplains. They work in parishes as religious education teachers and sacristans. The Brothers serve in the United States as well, where they ran St. James Trade School in Springfield, Illinois, from 1930 to 1972. Brother James Court is a residential immediate care facility for men with developmental disabilities.
