= Theodosius Florentini =

Swiss monk (1808–1865)

Theodosius Florentini (23 May 1808 at Münster, in the Grisons, Switzerland – 15 February 1865 at Heiden, in Appenzell) was a Swiss Capuchin friar, a founder of Catholic religious orders and institutions.

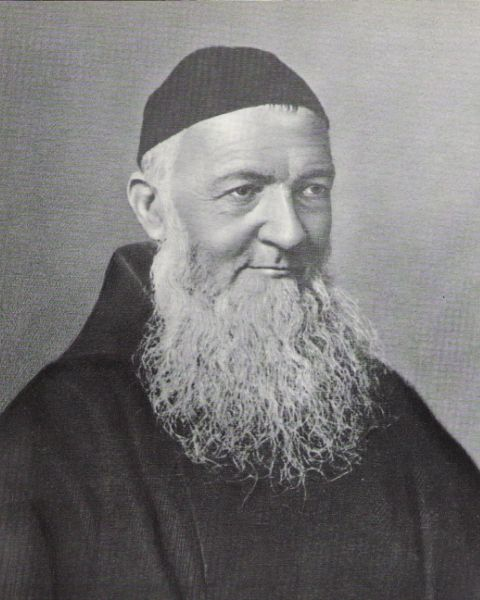
Theodosius Florentini.

== Life ==
Theodosius Florentini was born 23 May 1808 in Münster, Graubünden. He entered the Capuchin Franciscan Order, 22 October 1825, was ordained priest in 1830, and appointed novice master, and lecturer on philosophy and theology. In 1838 he became guardian at Baden; in 1845 superior and parish priest at Chur; in 1857 definitor, and in 1860 vicar-general of the Diocese of Chur.

After the Sonderbund war, the Radical party opposed Catholic interests. In consequence of his defence of the church, Florentini fled to Alsace in 1841. In August of the same year he returned.

== Foundations ==
He founded the Institute of the Sisters of the Holy Cross Menzingen. In the Capuchin church at Altorf on 16 October 1844, the first three sisters received the habit of the Third Order of St. Francis. Their constitutions enjoin upon them to make themselves all to all in order to win souls to Christ and to do nothing which might repel any from their mode of life. From this foundation grew the congregation of teaching sisters, with their mother-house at Menzingen.

Later on Florentini founded the congregation of Sisters of Mercy of the Holy Cross at Ingenbohl. Both were actively engaged in educational works; the Sisters of Mercy set up, besides, homes for the poor and sick, and undertook private nursing.

In 1845, he became Dean at the Cathedral of the Assumption of Mary in Chur. In the meantime, Florentini was himself busy as a schoolmaster. He superintended the people's schools (Volksschulen), which are attended by others besides the poor. He promoted continuation schools and was in favour of technical instruction for apprentices and workmen. He founded anew the suppressed Jesuit College, Maria-Hilf zu Schwyz. To stir up anew Catholic life he engaged in popular missions and retreats for priests.

The institution of the annual conference of the Swiss bishops was largely due to his efforts. To bring Swiss Catholics together to strengthen Catholic feeling, and to organize social works, he founded the Pius Society.

He was very keen upon the care and inspection of the helpless and dependent, such as boarded-out children, apprentices, neglected children, and discharged prisoners. With regard to the labour question, Florentini expressed himself in his speech at Frankfort in 1863. In demanding the Christianizing of industry, trade unions, and workmen's credit banks, he said:

"Formerly monasteries were turned into factories, now factories must become monasteries, and the profits must be shared with the workers".

Factories were established to carry out this idea, but they failed, owing to a lack of business capacity in the founders. At Ingenbohl, Florentini founded a printing and book-binding establishment and a society for the distribution of books.

== Works ==
Among his own writings are the Legends of the Saints in four volumes.
