= Franciscan Apostolic Sisters =

- Established: 1953; 73 years ago
- Founder: Gerardo Z. Filippeto, O.F.M.
- Type: Religious Institute of Pontifical Right (for Women)
- Headquarters: Generalate; Sta. Cruz, Sta. Ana, Cagayan Valley
- Region served: Asia, North America
- Superior General: Josephine P. Mata
- Post-nominal initials: FAS
- Affiliations: Roman Catholic
- Website: https://fassisters.blogspot.com/

The Franciscan Apostolic Sisters (F.A.S.) is a Roman Catholic religious congregation that was founded in the Philippines in 1953 by Gerardo Z. Filippeto. Filippeto was a missionary in the remote northeastern region of the nation. He founded this congregation of Franciscan tertiary sisters to help in the work of the missions and spreading the Gospel in that region.

They were given diocesan approval as a religious community on December 8, 1964, by the local bishop, Teodulfo Domingo, of the then-Diocese of Tuguegarao. On May 18, 1996, they were formally established as a Congregation of Diocesan Right in the now-Archdiocese of Tuguegarao by his successor, Archbishop Diosdado Talamayan.

The motherhouse is located in Cagayan, the Philippines. The sisters serve in various ministries, such as assisting in parishes and mission stations, as well as working in the local seminary and providing health care to the sick.

In 1992, the sisters established a house in the Diocese of Lincoln in the United States at St. Joseph Parish in York, Nebraska, where they serve as para-educators and pastoral care ministers. Six years later, in 1998, they were requested to help at St. Gregory the Great Seminary in Seward, Nebraska.
