= Sisters of St. Francis of the Martyr St. George =

The Sisters of St. Francis of the Martyr St. George is a Roman Catholic Congregation of consecrated women whose spirituality is derived from St. Francis of Assisi. Mother M. Anselma Bopp and Father John Gerard Dall founded the Order in Thuine, Germany, in 1869. The Order expanded to the U.S. in 1923 with the founding of a Provincialate and Novitiate in Alton, Illinois, which continues to be the location of the Provincial House. They are also located in other areas of Illinois, Missouri, Oklahoma, Nebraska, Kansas, New Jersey, Ohio, Washington, D.C., and Wisconsin, as well as on missions in Brazil and Cuba.

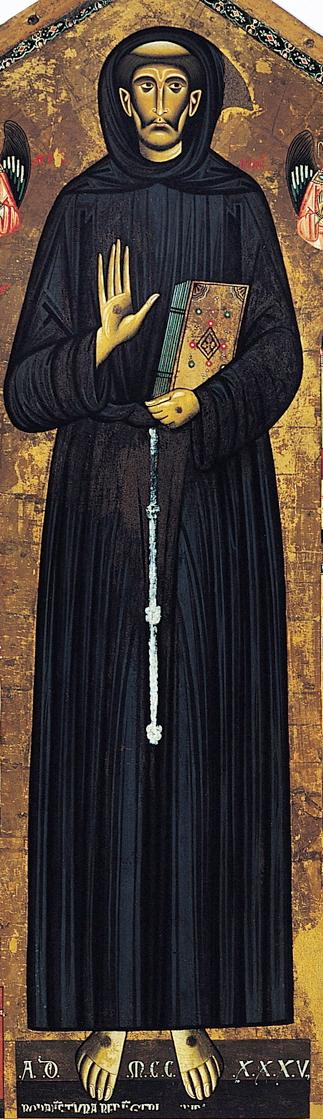
Bonaventura Berlingieri - St Francis of Assisi detail

== Charisms and apostolate ==
The main charism of the Sisters of St. Francis of the martyr St. George is to “make the merciful love of Christ visible”—i.e., to be the hands and feet of Jesus Christ to show the world His love for each person. The religious sisters have particular devotions to the Sacred Heart of Jesus, the Mass, the Eucharist, Scripture, the Liturgy of the Hours, and the Stations of the Cross. They live out these charisms by celebrating Mass daily and having Benediction and exposition of the Blessed Sacrament daily from 6:30 a.m. until 8:30 p.m. and all night on Fridays. They set aside time daily for Scripture meditation and pray the Liturgy of the Hours, the prayer of the universal Church, 4 times daily. The Sisters also meditate on the Way of the Cross and pray the rosary daily.

Their Franciscan Spirituality follows St. Francis of Assisi’s particular love for the Incarnation and Passion of Christ, as well as adoring and receiving the Holy Eucharist. An additional charism that expresses their love for the Passion of Christ is the Cross prayer. St. Francis prayed with his arms outstretched before the Crucifix, and the Sisters imitate this action as a prayer of abandonment and surrender to God’s Will.

The Sisters of St. Francis of the Martyr St. George exercise their charisms through serving the Church in different apostolic works, including health care, education, child care, care of the elderly, parish and diocesan office work, household services in bishops’ households, and priest retirement homes, and within their own convents and house of formation.

=== Health care ===
Two of the major health care venues the Sisters serve in are Saint Anthony's Health Center and Mother of Good Counsel Home.

The Sisters founded Saint Anthony's Health Center in Alton, Illinois, in 1925, but it was an infirmary until 1956 when it became a fully licensed hospital. It is now located on two campuses in Alton—Saint Anthony's Health Center and Saint Clare's Hospital. There is also a supportive living facility for seniors—Saint Clare's Villa—that is located inside the hospital.

Mother of Good Counsel Home is located in St. Louis, Missouri. It was established in 1929 by the National Catholic Women's Union (NCWU). After asking the Sisters of St. Francis of the Martyr St. George to provide care in the nursing home in 1932, the NCWU sold the facility to the Sisters in 1935. The Sisters serve in many faculties, such as administration, housekeeping, nurses, and Certified Nurses Aides (CNAs).

=== Education ===
The Sisters are currently teaching in the Dioceses of Springfield and Peoria, IL; Tulsa, OK; Steubenville, OH; Lincoln, NE; Metuchen, NJ; as well as the Archdioceses of St. Louis, MO; Kansas City, KS.

=== Care for clergy ===
Their care for clergy spans the entire age range—from seminary to retirement. They started out with serving retired priests at Bonacum House in 1987 and Maria Regina Residence in 1989. Bonacum House is a residence for retired priests in the Diocese of Lincoln, Nebraska. The Maria Regina Residence is a similar home in the Diocese of Metuchen, New Jersey. In 1995, the Sisters were invited to serve the Apostolic Nuncio to the United States at the Papal Ninciature, also called the Apostolic Nunciature, in Washington, D.C. The Sisters also served in Rome, Italy, in Raymond Cardinal Burke’s residence when he was Prefect for the Supreme Tribunal of the Apostolic Signatura. In 2011, the Sisters began serving seminarians in Havana, Cuba, at San Carlos and San Ambrosio Seminary.

=== House of formation ===
The Mater Redemptoris House of Formation was founded in 2000 in the Diocese of La Crosse as a residential and retreat house and is staffed by the Sisters. The goal of Mater Redemptoris is to aid Catholic women in discerning their vocations, form them in prayer and understanding of consecrated life, and educate youth about consecrated life.

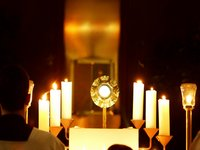
Eucharistic Adoration

The Mater Redemptoris House of Formation was closed in 2019 by Bishop William Callahan.

=== Adoration Sisters ===
After Sisters have retired from the regular apostolates, they become Adoration Sisters. They spend the majority of their time adoring Jesus Christ in the Blessed Sacrament and praying that the merciful love of Christ continue to be made known.

== Vows ==
The Sisters, like other Catholic religious, take vows of poverty, chastity, and obedience. The vow of poverty is to renounce material possessions in order to live more freely and simply to follow Christ. The religious chastity vow marks a total consecration and spousal relationship with Christ. Obedience is a submission to follow the guidance of the superiors. In 2013 the Provincial Superior of the American Province was Mother M. Maximilia Um and the General Superior was Mother Margaretha Maria Brand.

== Formation ==
There are three formal stages of formation: Postulancy, Novitiate, and Juniorate.

=== Postulancy ===
"Postulant" is Latin for "asking". The Postulancy is a young woman's gradual immersion into the religious life. The time duration of this stage varies among different Orders, but for the Sisters of St. Francis of the Martyr St. George this period lasts anywhere from six months to two years. During this stage, the woman wears a simple jumper.

=== Novitiate ===
"Novitiate" comes from the Latin word "novicius", which means "new". This stage lasts for two years for the Sisters of St. Francis of the Martyr St. George. During the first year, novices study the Franciscan Rule and the order's Constitutions and deepen their prayer lives. Novices are sent on mission at one of the apostolates during the second year before returning to prepare for First Profession of vows. Upon entrance to the Novitiate is also when the young woman receives her religious name and a habit, but she has a white veil instead of a black veil. The Sisters have two different colored habits. Their gray habits are "work habits" that they wear during the week. They have black habits for Sundays and other special events.

=== Juniorate ===
First Profession of vows is only temporary, which brings the Sister to the Juniorate. The stage is at least three years long, during which the Sister annually renews her vows. She lives as a Professed Sister and continues to grow deeper in her life as a religious Sister. This is also the time she begins her work or studies. Additionally, she receives a black veil and a crucifix.

=== Final profession ===
When a Sister makes her Final Profession of Vows, her vows are permanent. She wears a ring on her left ring finger to signify her marriage to Christ. However, formation does not end there. She lives the rest of her life as a Sister growing in her Catholic faith and the Franciscan way of life. Additionally, each Sister continues to go on annual retreats.

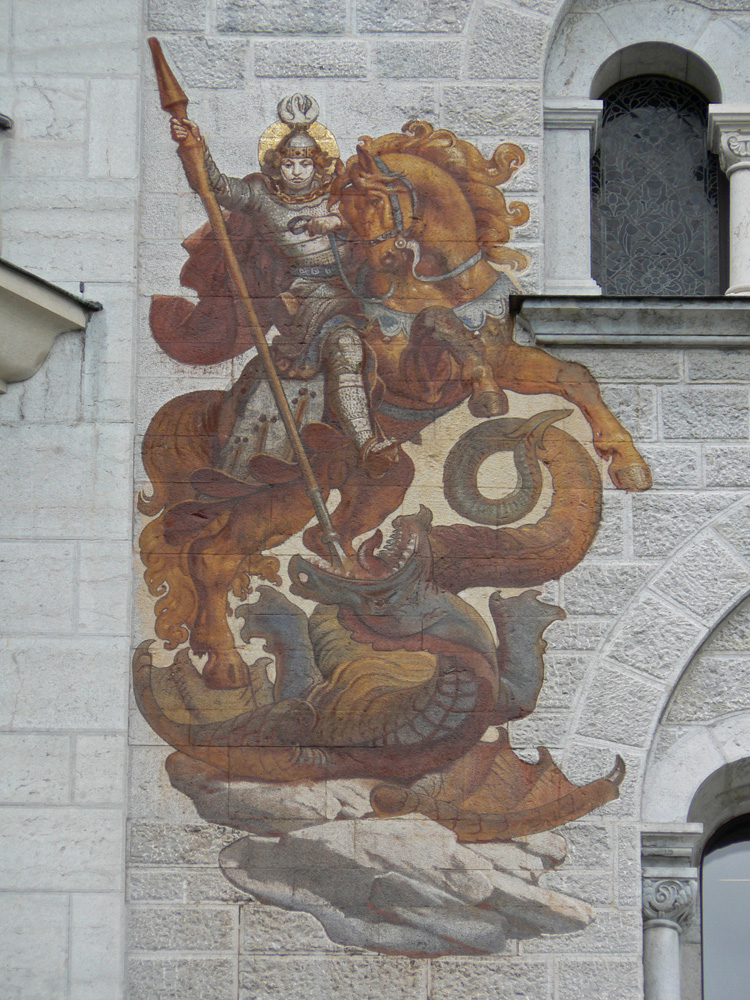
Neuschwanstein. St George

== St. George ==
The Congregation originally asked for the name Sisters of St. Francis of the Sacred Heart, but there was already a religious Order by that name. They were encouraged to take the name of a parish they founded in Germany—St. George. The Martyr St. George was a soldier in the Diocletian military in Nicomedia when a war waged against the Christian religion. He laid aside his military dignity, refused to fight, and complained to the emperor. He was immediately thrown into prison where he was later tortured with great cruelty, but nothing shook his beliefs. He was led through the city and beheaded. He is usually depicted on horseback with a sword drawn at the dragon under his feet. This figure is only a symbolic representation that by his faith and Christian fortitude he conquered the devil, who is called a dragon in the Apocalypse. From this image, he is often called St. George the Dragon Slayer.
