= Franciscan Sisters of Penance of the Sorrowful Mother =

The Franciscan Sisters, TOR of Penance of the Sorrowful Mother are a Roman Catholic religious congregation founded on August 15, 1988 in the Diocese of Steubenville, in Ohio, United States, by Bishop Albert Henry Ottenweller. The sisters work with the poor and needy of the diocese, as well as leading religious retreats and working to catechize the young. They also serve as campus ministers at Franciscan University of Steubenville and at Florida State University in Tallahassee, Florida.
