= Angela Truszkowska =

Polish religious sister

Blessed Angela Truszkowska
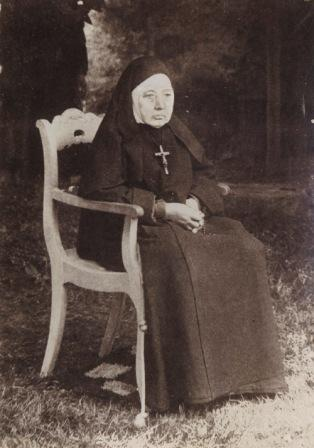
- Born: May 16th, 1825; Kalisz, Congress Poland
- Died: October 10, 1898 (aged 73); Kraków, Kingdom of Galicia and Lodomeria
- Venerated in: Roman Catholic Church
- Beatified: April 18, 1993, St. Peter's Square, Vatican City by Pope John Paul II
- Feast: 10 October

Angela Truszkowska (born Sophia Camille Truszkowska, May 16, 1825 – October 10, 1899) was a Polish religious sister who has been beatified by the Roman Catholic Church. Foundress of the Congregation of Sisters of St. Felix of Cantalice Third Order Regular of St. Francis of Assisi (Felician sisters), she forged one of the first active-contemplative communities that, nearly a century and a half later, would grow to include more than 1,800 sisters over four continents serving in an array of ministries.

== Life ==
Sophia Camille Truszkowska was born in Kalisz, Poland in 1825, the eldest of seven children of Joseph and Josephine Rudzińska Truszkowska. Her days as a young student were characterized by schoolwork and reading, as well as daily Mass, and adoration of the Blessed sacrament. At the same time, her compassion for the underprivileged grew as she gained invaluable insight into the social ills and issues of her time from her father, a juvenile court judge. When Truszkowska was twelve years old, her father was appointed Registrar of Deeds, and the family moved to Warsaw.

At the age of sixteen, Truszkowska contracted tuberculosis. The family physician recommended a rest in Switzerland to restore her health. After a year, Truszkowska returned to Warsaw and left boarding school in order to study privately at home. With access to her father's vast library collection, she continued her study of Latin and her already fluent knowledge of French. She also pursued studies in contemporary philosophy, ethics, and social thought.

At one point, Truszkowska had considered joining a cloistered community of nuns, but soon joined the Society of St. Vincent de Paul and began ministering to the abandoned children and homeless on the streets of Warsaw. In time, she opened a shelter to give comfort and aid to this vulnerable population. At the suggestion of her spiritual director, Honorat Kozminski OFMCap, she joined the secular Third Order of Saint Francis, taking the religious name Angela.

== Congregation of the Sisters of Saint Felix of Cantalice ==
In 1855 she rented a small house near the Church of the Virgin Mary for the orphaned girls and elderly women whom she gathered off the streets. It became known as the "Institute of Miss Truszkowska". Truszkowska, who was now known as "Mother Angela", decided to consecrate herself totally to God and forged a new religious community steeped in the values and ideals of Francis of Assisi.

Due to an increasing number of women and children, it was necessary for Truszkowska to find a larger home for the institute. Truszkowska and her cousin Clothilde left their homes to live at the institute and care for the residents there. On the Feast of the Presentation of the Blessed Virgin Mary, November 21, 1855, Angela and her cousin Clothilde Ciechanowska, praying before an icon of Our Lady of Czestochowa, solemnly dedicated themselves to do the will of Jesus Christ. For the Felician sisters this day is considered the official founding day of the Congregation of the Sisters of St. Felix of Cantalice.

This new community embodied the active-contemplative model of Felix of Cantalice, the first Capuchin Franciscan to be canonized. In 1857, she and several associates took the Franciscan habit. Truszkowska added the name Mary to her religious name. The sisters were often called the Sisters of Saint Felix or Felicians by the people of Warsaw, becoming known as the Felician Sisters.

The sisters expanded their work among the Greek Catholics in Podlasie, where she established a number of houses in which the sisters conducted centers for peasant children. with the outbreak of the January Insurrection (1863) the centers were converted into hospitals where the wounded rebel soldiers received care.

Truszkowska was scarcely forty-four years old when she withdrew from active leadership in her congregation due to increasing deafness. She saw the order grow and expand, including missions to the United States among the sons and daughters of Polish immigrants. She died on October 10, 1899.

== Veneration ==
The cause for Truszkowska's beatification was formally opened on April 9, 1959, and she was beatified by Pope John Paul II on April 18, 1993. Blessed Mary Angela R.C. Parish in Dunkirk, New York, is named after her. Northern Cambria Catholic School in Nicktown, Pennsylvania is under her patronage.
