= Maria Katherina Scherer =

Beatified Swiss nun

Blessed Anna Maria Katherina Scherer TOSF
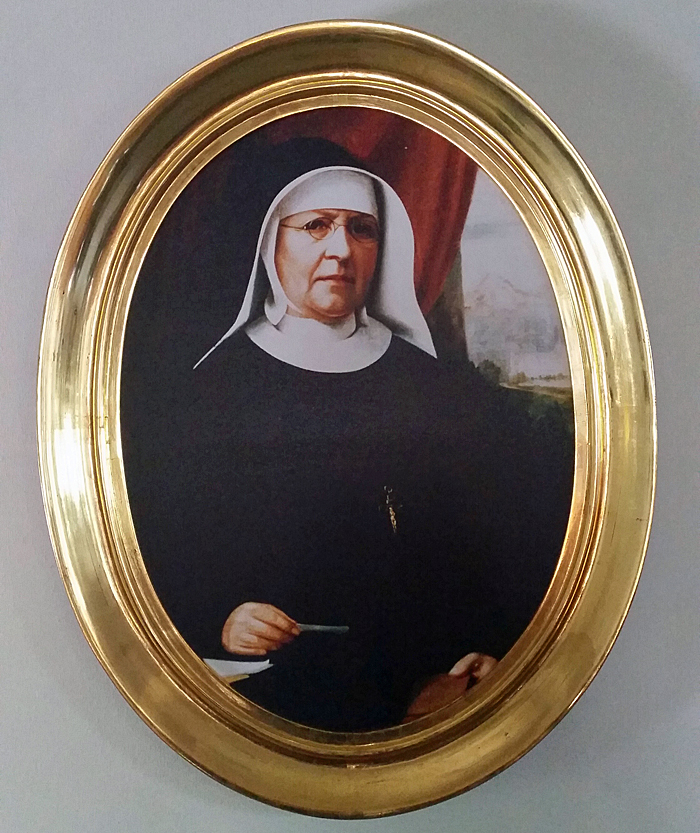

Virgin
- Born: 31 October 1825; Meggen, Luzern, Switzerland
- Died: 16 June 1888 (aged 62); Ingenbohl, Schwyz, Switzerland
- Venerated in: Roman Catholic Church
- Beatified: 29 October 1995, Saint Peter's Basilica, Vatican City by Pope John Paul II
- Feast: 16 June

Anna Maria Katherina Scherer (31 October 1825 – 16 June 1888) was a Swiss religious sister and the co-founder of the Sisters of Mercy of the Holy Cross. She founded that congregation alongside the Capuchin priest Theodosius Florentini. She was given the name Maria Theresia upon her investiture.

She was beatified on 29 October 1995.

== Life ==
Anna Maria Katherina Scherer was born as the fourth of seven children to poor farmers on 31 October 1825. She was aged seven when her father died on 5 February 1855. At the time three children could remain with their mother while the others had to be taken in the care of relatives and she was among those that had to leave their mother. Catherine was brought up with her cousins the Sigrists family.

On a pilgrimage to Einsiedeln in July 1844, she realized her vocation and true purpose in life was to the religious life. At the age of seventeen she became a member of the Third Order of Saint Francis. On 1 March 1845 she entered the new "Teaching Sisters of Holy Cross" that the Capuchin priest Theodosius Florentini founded – the two met on 5 October 1844. On 27 June 1845, she left with a friend for the novitiate in Menzingen and around that time received the habit from Florentini while on 27 October 1845 she pronounced her first vows and was given the religious name of "Maria Theresia". From that point until 1846, she worked in Galgenen and was then sent to teach at Baar until being sent to Oberägeri where she was made the superior of small communities clustered there.

In 1850, Theodosius put her in charge of a home for the poor and orphaned at Nagels and became known there as the "Mother of the poor". Around that time in 1850 she was asked to take administration of a hospital that the priest had just opened. In 1852 she was sent to Chur. In 1857 she was appointed as the superior general of the Sisters of Mercy and with Theodosius co-founded a new religious institute dedicated to the healing ministry. Scherer became superior of the congregation after this on 13 October 1857 and held the position until her death.

In August 1872 the Capuchin priest Paul was appointed as Theodosius' successor and wanted to transform the institute to one that would be contemplative in outlook. He sought to win over the congregation as well as his Capuchin superiors and the local bishops but instead sowed doubt amongst the congregation's members. Scherer became aware of this and confronted Paul to inform him of her disagreement. He persisted with his idea and she wrote to the bishop to inform him of her resignation which was accepted. The religious in the congregation wrote to the bishop on numerous occasions demanding that Scherer be reinstated. In July 1873 an ecclesiastical counselor was appointed to examine the case and he found Paul's idea was unfeasible. It resulted in Paul being transferred and Scherer being reinstated.

Scherer was found to have contracted a stomach tumor in 1887 and received the last rites on 1 May 1888. She died after a period of great pain in the evening of 16 June 1888 as she murmured: "Heaven ... Heaven!".

== Beatification ==
Scherer's spiritual writings were approved by theologians on 6 December 1942. The beatification process commenced in Chur on 11 December 1949 under Pope Pius XII, granting Scherer the title of Servant of God. The Congregation of Rites validated the previous processes in 1953 and following this progress stalled for several decades until the postulation submitted the Positio to the Congregation for the Causes of Saints in 1991. On 2 April 1993 she was declared to be venerable after Pope John Paul II confirmed her life of heroic virtue.

The miracle required for her beatification was investigated in the diocese that it originated in and received validation from Roman officials in 1992. Pope John Paul II granted his final approval on 23 December 1993 and beatified her on 29 October 1995.
