= Maria Hueber =

Tyrolean religious sister

Venerable Maria Hueber TOSF
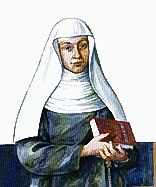
- Born: 22 May 1653; Bressanone, Bolzano, Prince-Bishopric of Brixen, Holy Roman Empire
- Died: 31 July 1705 (aged 52); Bressanone, Bolzano, Prince-Bishopric of Brixen, Holy Roman Empire

Maria Hueber (22 May 1653 – 31 July 1705) was a Tyrolean religious sister, a pioneer in educating girls in and foundress of a congregation of the Third Order of Saint Francis in Brixen.

== Early life ==
Hueber was born to the Brixen tower watchman, Nikolaus Hueber, and his wife Anna Tapp in 1653. Nikolaus died when she was three months old, leaving Anna to bring three children up through her work as a seamstress and by caring for the sick. Anna taught Maria reading, arithmetic, and sewing.

Hueber worked in several residences in Brixen from childhood to supplement her mother's income. She moved to Bolzano, Innsbruck, and then Salzburg in the 1670s, to work in several residences of lay and clergy alike, before her mother's ill health forced her to return home. In the course of her service, she struck acquaintances with many of the religious people she worked for, particularly with the Order of the Servants of Mary in Innsbruck. She corresponded often with several of them.

In 1679, she chose to join the Third Order of St. Francis. She led a religious life while also nursing her sick mother. Her mother died in 1696.

== Religious community ==
Hueber's confessor, Isidor Kirnigl, had come across a community of religious sisters in Rome who were teaching poor girls. When he suggested that Maria attempt something similar in Brixen, she, along with her associate Regina Pfurner, started a congregation Franciscan tertiaries and opened a school for girls on 12 September 1700: the first such institution in Tyrol. The girls were taught reading, writing and sewing.

Maria Hueber died in 1705, and was buried at the side entrance of the Poor Clares's church in Brixen.

== The congregation today ==
The Tertiary Sisters, a community of around 160 in 2019, run the Herz-Jesu-Institut ("Institute of the Sacred Heart of Jesus") in Mühlbach, South Tyrol, the Pädagogisches Gymnasium in Bolzano and the Marienklinik in Bolzano. They also engage in missions in Cameroon and Bolivia. The generalate is in Rome.

== Beatification ==
The process for the beatification of Maria Hueber began in 1996. On 19 March 2019, Pope Francis authorized Cardinal Giovanni Angelo Becciu, prefect of the Congregation for the Causes of Saints to issue the decree of her heroic virtue.
