= Alice Ingham =

English Catholic sister, missionary (1830–1890)

Alice Ingham (8 March 1830 – 24 August 1890) was an English Catholic religious sister and missionary. She founded the Franciscan order of Sisters of St. Joseph's Society for Foreign Missions.

== Biography ==
She was born 8 March 1830 in Rochdale, England to George and Margaret Ingham. Her mother died in 1842; her father remarried. After an elementary education, Alice went to work in a cotton mill, after which she was apprenticed to her father, a draper based in Yorkshire Street, where she worked with her step-mother. By 1861 he had become invalid, and she was running the family business, which was then called "Ingham's Caps and Confectionery". She was known locally for her charitable work. In 1861 she joined the third order Franciscans.

Her father died in 1865 and, after receiving advice and encouragement from a Franciscan priest and a Passionist nun, she started a small religious and charitable organisation of women in 1871. As the community grew, she opened a second shop on nearby John Street.

In 1878, Herbert Vaughan, then Bishop of Salford, suggested that Ingham's group take on domestic duties at St Joseph's Foreign Missionary College, in Mill Hill, London. Although some of the women preferred to continue with their local welfare work, the shops were sold and the group moved to London. The move would eventually provide the opportunity for the sisters themselves to become missionaries.

== Franciscan Missionaries of St. Joseph ==
In 1883 Ingham and eleven of her congregation took temporary vows, and her congregation became established as the "Sisters of St. Joseph’s Society, Associates of Mill Hill". In 1884 she took her full vows. She was given the name "Mary Francis". The sisters also took charge of the domestic economy first at St. Peter's school in Kelvedon, and then at Freshfield. In Salford, they managed the first home for waifs, and opened others in Manchester and Blackburn. They came to be known as "the Rescue Sisters".

In 1885 five of the sisters went as missionaries to Borneo. Ninety-three years later they left flourishing local Congregations of Sisters to serve the Church.

In 1886 the sisters moved back to Lancashire, first running the Children's Rescue and Protection Society at Ardwick Hall and moving to Blackburn in 1888.

Ingham was bedridden in the last years of her life and died on 24 August 1890 at Blackburn at the age of 60. She was buried at Mill Hill. Today the Sisters of St. Joseph run homes at Patricraft, Mill Hill, Blackburn, Freshfield, Waterford, Cork, Rozendaal and various stations in Borneo.

The first community was sent to Holland in 1891 and in 1906 the Sisters began work in Ireland. In 1925 their name was changed to Franciscan Missionaries of St. Joseph. In 1929 the sisters were made a Pontifical Congregation separate from the Mill Hill Society but continue to work closely with the Mill Hill Fathers. In more recent times, the congregation's work in managing colleges has been superseded by care for the elderly.

The Franciscan Missionaries of St. Joseph are also known as the Mill Hill Sisters. They take the abbreviation FMSJ after their names. Their Generalate is located at St. Joseph's Convent, Manchester. As of 2019, there are sisters working in seven countries.

== See also ==
- Elizabeth Prout – English Catholic, founder of Passionist Sisters (1820–1864)
