= Thuine =

- Municipality
- Flag Coat of arms

- Location of Thuine within Emsland district
- Interactive map of Thuine
- Location within Germany Location within Lower Saxony
- Coordinates: 52°30′N 07°28′E
- Country: Germany
- State: Lower Saxony
- District: Emsland
- Municipal assoc.: Freren

Government
  - Mayor: Karl Heinz Gebbe (CDU)

Area
  - Total: 12.47 km^{2} (4.81 sq mi)
- Elevation: 43 m (141 ft)

Population (2025-12-31)
  - Total: 1,725
  - Density: 138.3/km^{2} (358.3/sq mi)
- Time zone: UTC+01:00 (CET)
  - Summer (DST): UTC+02:00 (CEST)
- Postal codes: 49832
- Dialling codes: 0 59 02
- Vehicle registration: EL

Thuine is a municipality in the Emsland district, in Lower Saxony, Germany.

== People ==
- Doris Achelwilm (born 1976), politician (The Linke)
