= Hausen (Wied) =

- Municipality
- Coat of arms

- Location of Hausen within Neuwied district
- Interactive map of Hausen
- Location within Germany Location within Rhineland-Palatinate
- Coordinates: 50°32′37″N 07°24′29″E
- Country: Germany
- State: Rhineland-Palatinate
- District: Neuwied
- Municipal assoc.: Rengsdorf-Waldbreitbach

Government
  - Mayor (2019–24): Carmen Boden

Area
  - Total: 7.72 km^{2} (2.98 sq mi)
- Elevation: 130 m (430 ft)

Population (2025-12-31)
  - Total: 1,829
  - Density: 237/km^{2} (614/sq mi)
- Time zone: UTC+01:00 (CET)
  - Summer (DST): UTC+02:00 (CEST)
- Postal codes: 53547
- Dialling codes: 02638
- Vehicle registration: NR

Hausen (Wied) (German pronunciation: [ˈhaʊzn̩]) is a municipality and a spa town in the district of Neuwied, in Rhineland-Palatinate, Germany.
