= Motherhouse =

Principal house for a Catholic institute

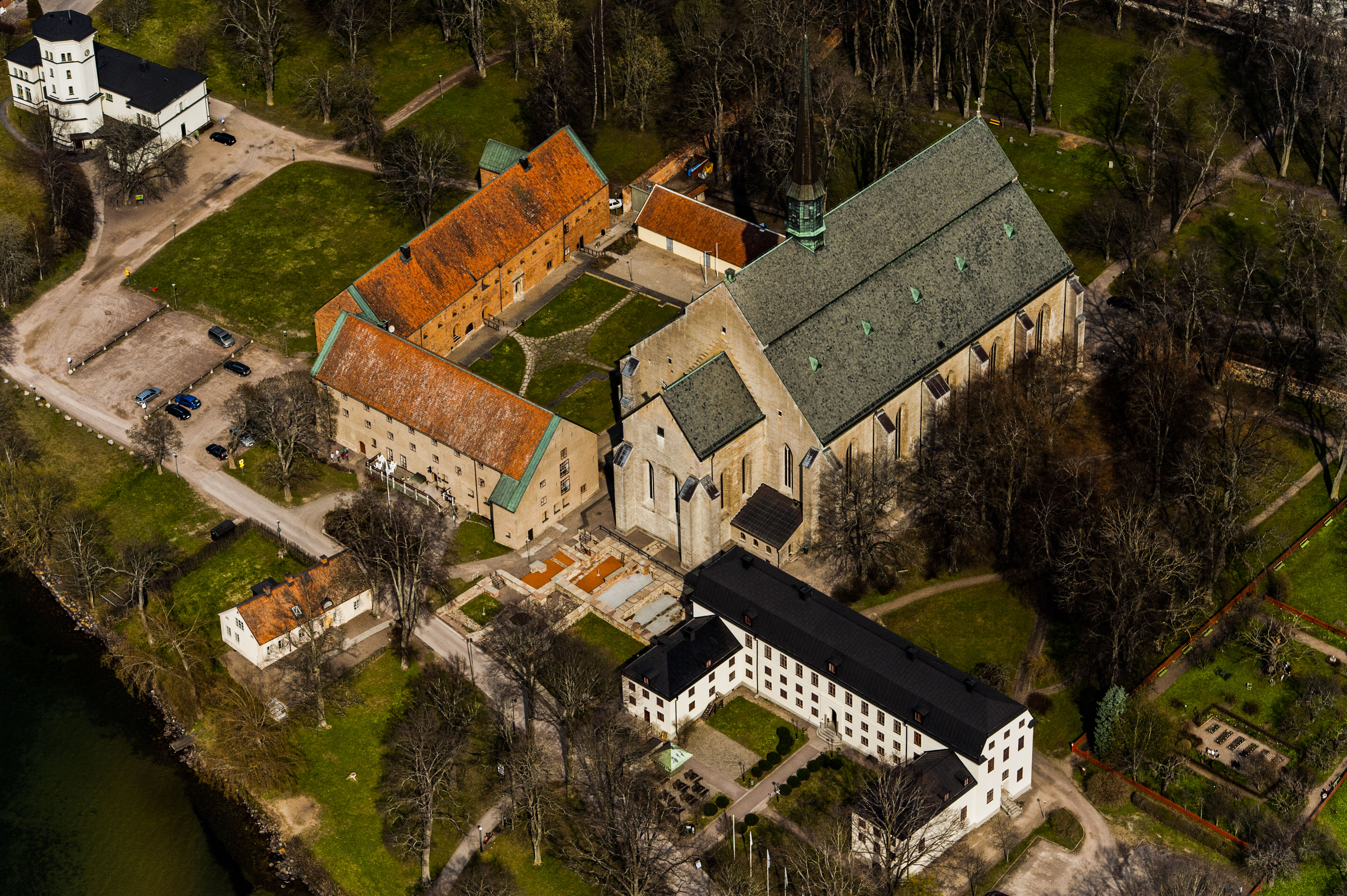
Vadstena Abbey served as the motherhouse of the Order of the Most Holy Saviour from 1346 to 1595.

A motherhouse or mother house is the principal house or community for a Christian religious community, particularly those of the Roman Catholic and Evangelical-Lutheran traditions. One example is the Missionaries of Charity's motherhouse in Kolkata, which functions as the congregation's headquarters. A motherhouse would normally be where the residence and offices of the religious superior of the community would be located. If the community is divided geographically, it is referred to as the provincial motherhouse and would be where the regional superior would be in residence.
