= Sisters of the Sacred Hearts of Jesus and Mary =

The Sisters of the Sacred Hearts of Jesus and Mary (SS.H.J.M.) are a group of Catholic Religious Sisters who were established in London, England, in 1903. There they are commonly known as the Chigwell Sisters. In collaboration with their associates, auxiliaries, co-workers and volunteers, the Sisters work with the poor of the world, both to identify and transform underlying causes of suffering and to meet their practical needs. However, the order has been involved in controversies that exploited such poverty, such as forced adoptions and "Mother and Baby" homes.

== Origins ==
The congregation has its origin in the French religious institute of the Sisters Servants of the Sacred Heart, founded by the Abbé Peter-Victor Braun in Paris in 1866. In the course of his ministry, Braun served in a seedy quarter of the city where he became aware of the struggle of the young women there who had come as unskilled workers, especially when they were not able to find work in the factories. With the help of a small group of volunteers he opened a hostel where the young women could find a refuge and place of support. He also opened a day care center so that mothers could be free to find employment to support their families. Additionally home visits were done by his volunteer ladies to the residences of the sick poor to care for them in their need.

By October 1866, Braun had reluctantly concluded that the work had to be entrusted to a congregation of professed Religious Sisters in order to guarantee its continuity. Thus he established three of these volunteers as a religious congregation, the Sisters Servants of the Sacred Heart, under the leadership of a Bavarian woman, Sister Anna Katharina Berger, who had come to Paris already a member of a community of Franciscan Sisters founded by the Blessed Paul Joseph Nardini in Pirmasens. She was appointed by Braun as Mother Superior of the small community under the name Mother Mary Odilia.

== Revolution and exile ==
The sudden outbreak of the Franco-Prussian War in 1870 caused a major change in the future of the small congregation. Rumors of anti-Catholic atrocities by the Paris Commune caused a group of the Sisters to flee to England for safety. They were followed by a larger group, who brought with them Braun, who was suffering from shock due to having ministered at the battlefront. Because of her nationality, the co-founder, Mother Odilia, was forced to return to her native Germany. (Note: Berger initially settled in the Rhineland, where she attempted to found a new community along the same lines. Thwarted by government policies of the Kulturkampf, she emigrated to the United States, settling with some companions in St. Louis, Missouri, where she founded the Sisters of St. Mary, now the Franciscan Sisters of Mary. They established and run hospitals throughout the Midwestern United States.) The German and Austrian sisters were expelled from France and formed their own Congregation, Dienerinnen des heiligsten Herzens Jesu based in Vienna, Austria.

The refugees were warmly received by Cardinal Henry Edward Manning, the Archbishop of Westminster, who gave them a small house in the Stratford area of the city. The Sisters quickly established themselves in the East End of London where they began again their mission of helping struggling workers and their families. Their numbers in England grew, and the Sisters began to serve in Scotland and Wales, where they provided medical care in mining towns. They also opened schools where they taught the local children. They began the tradition of the entire community going out on weekends to visit the Catholic homes of the area.

== Separation ==
After the upheavals of the Franco-Prussian War, and the subsequent uprisings, with the establishment of peace in France by the late 1870s, some of the French Sisters returned to their homeland. They re-established the congregation there and its work.

After a generation, however, differences in vision began to emerge between the English and French Sisters. Under the advice of Cardinal Herbert Vaughan, in 1902 the majority of Sisters in England elected to separate from the Sister Servants of the Sacred Heart and to form a new congregation. They took the name the congregation now bears at its formal establishment on 3 March 1903. The Motherhouse of the new congregation was established in the London suburb of Chigwell, from which the Sisters are popularly known in England. Sister Winifride Tyrrell, born near Monasterevin in Ireland, who had served for many years as a principal in the Mile End neighborhood of London, was elected as the first Superior General.

== Expansion ==
Under the guidance of Mother Winifride the early Sisters served the poor in industrial cities, towns and villages throughout England, Scotland and Wales. Their first Irish foundation was made in Cork in 1922, followed by Cardiff in Wales.

In the mid-1950s the congregation has been established in the United States, in the Roman Catholic Diocese of Oakland and in Zambia. At the start of the 21st century, the Sisters started to serve war-ravaged populations in Colombia and El Salvador. In 2001 they embarked on providing computer literacy to the street children of Cebu in the Philippines. Sisters of the Sacred Hearts of Jesus and Mary" The following year they began caring for AIDS patients in Kampala, Uganda.

In 2003 the three congregations stemming from Braun's work formed the Victor Braun Federation. Made up of the three congregations which trace their roots to Braun's original group, the members are: the Sœurs Servantes du Sacré-Cœur de Jésus, Dienerinnen des heiligsten Herzens Jesu in Austria, and the Sisters of the Sacred Hearts of Jesus and Mary. Projects are developed to meet local needs. In general terms these are aimed at the education and welfare of children and training and health education for adults.

The Sisters also operated a "mother and baby home" in Sean Ross Abbey in Ireland from 1930 to 1970. Life at the home features in the 2009 book The Lost Child of Philomena Lee by Martin Sixsmith, and in Philomena, the 2013 film that is based on it. During that period, mothers and children were often forcibly separated, with some children being removed for adoption in the US in exchange of donations to the home.

Additionally, the Sisters ran the Bessborough Home in Cork City for almost 80 years, during which time 923 infants died there. The Mother and Baby Homes Commission of Investigation published an interim report in 2019, which said it was only able to establish where 64 of the children were buried and that it seemed only one was buried in the Bessborough cemetery, where many of the nuns were interred. The Commission expressed concern and doubt that no one in the congregation was able to say where the other infants were buried.

In 1939, the Sisters of the Sacred Heart took over the Priory of St. Augustine, in Old Colwyn, Wales—originally built as a hotel—from a community of Augustinian nuns. Over the years it has served as a holiday home for the Sisters, a guest house and a residential nursing home. In 2010, the Congregation opened it as a retreat house.

== See also ==
- Mary Odilia Berger
