= Franciscan Sisters of Mary =

Catholic religious medical organisation

The Franciscan Sisters of Mary is a Roman Catholic religious congregation of religious sisters based in St. Louis, Missouri, noted for its operation of SSM Health Care, a group of some 20 hospitals throughout the Midwestern United States. It was formed in 1987 from the merger of two related congregations that founded many of the hospitals.

== Sisters of Mary ==
The Sisters of St. Mary (S.S.M.) was a Roman Catholic religious congregation for women based in St. Louis and founded by Mary Odilia Berger. She was born Anna Katherine Berger in Regen in the Kingdom of Bavaria. In 1858, she joined the Poor Franciscan Sisters of Pirmasens, which later became the Poor Franciscan Sisters of the Holy Family of Pirmasens, Germany, founded by the Blessed Paul Joseph Nardini, and was sent to beg in Paris.

In Paris, she co-founded the Sisters Servants of the Sacred Heart in 1866 with the Abbé Peter-Victor Braun, but had to flee Paris when the city was besieged during the Franco-Prussian War. Berger spent several years in Elberfeld in the Rhineland, where she tried to start a new community with the same goals. Frustrated by the government's policy of Kulturkampf, she and four of her companions emigrated to St. Louis in 1872.

Their residence shared a door with St. Mary of Victories Church in downtown St. Louis. In 1874, they founded the Sisters of St. Mary under the Rule of the Franciscan Third Order Regular. In 1877 the congregation opened St. Mary's Infirmary in St. Louis. In 1878 Berger sent a third of the members of the congregation to Canton, Mississippi, and Memphis, Tennessee, during a Yellow fever outbreak in those cities. Five young sisters died from the illness.

In 1912, at the request of several Madison physicians and local clergy, eight Sisters of Mary arrived from St. Louis, established a "Sisters' Hospital" for the city of Madison. St. Mary's Hospital opened its doors and its 70 beds on September 22, 1912.

Before 1946, there were few opportunities for women of color to obtain professional training in health care. That year, St. Mary's Infirmary School of Nursing in St. Louis accepted qualified candidates from across the country.

== Sisters of St. Francis of Maryville ==
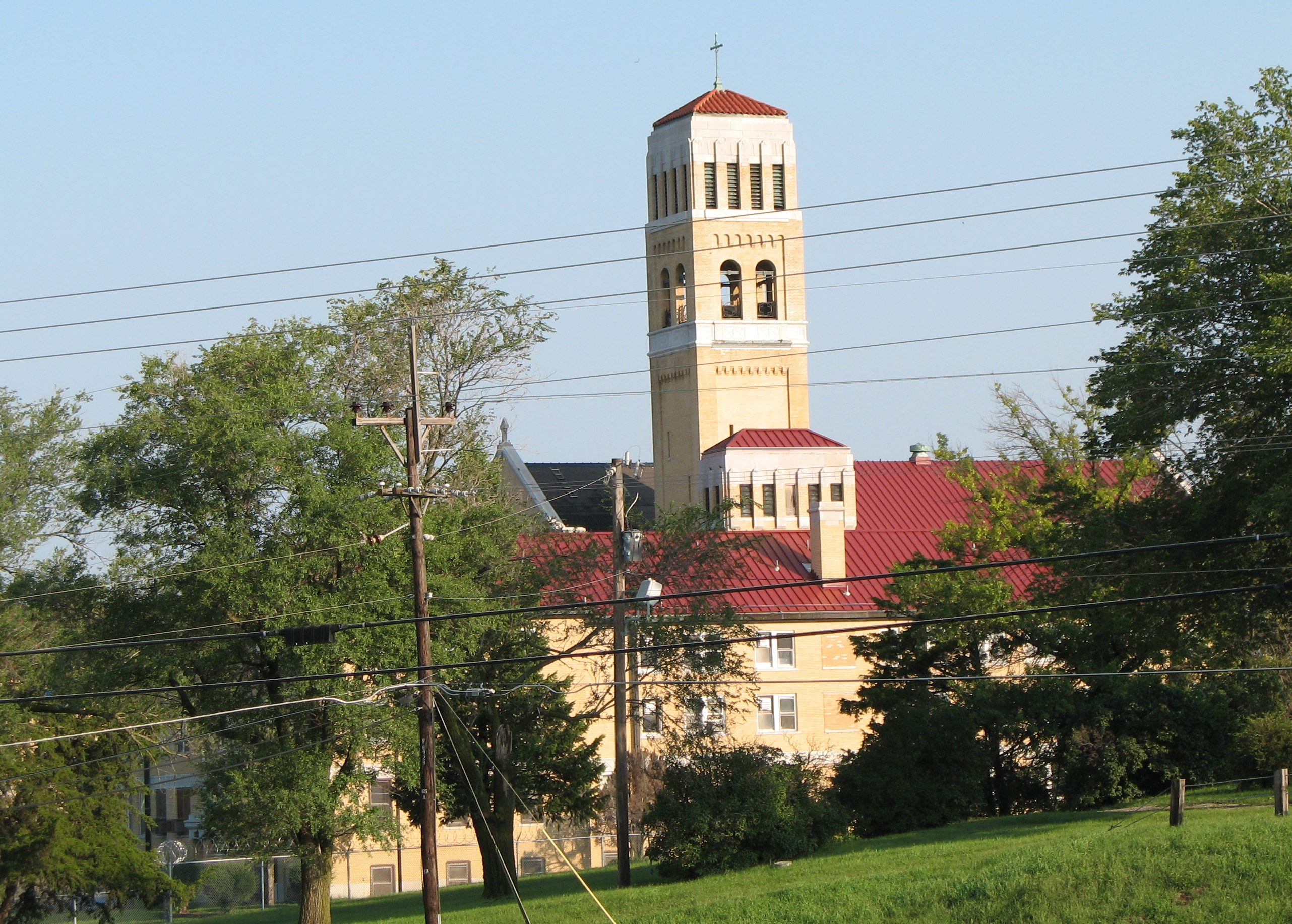
Maryville Treatment Center at Mount Alverno on the bluffs above the 102 River

The Sisters of St. Francis of Maryville (postnominal initials: S.S.M.) was a Roman Catholic religious congregation for women based in Maryville, Missouri, which followed the Rule of the Third Order of St. Francis. Their ministry was focused on medical care, so they founded hospitals in Missouri and Oklahoma.

The congregation was founded in 1894 when Mother Mary Augustine Giesen led six other sisters to Maryville from the St. Louis, Missouri motherhouse of the Sisters of St. Mary. They then became independent of that congregation, with Mother Augustine as the first Superior General. While the Sisters of St. Mary worked largely in the St. Louis urban area, the Sisters of St. Francis worked in more rural areas.

They founded St. Francis Hospital, the only hospital in the town and one of only two hospitals in the vast Platte Purchase area of northwest Missouri north of St. Joseph, Missouri (the other hospital is in Fairfax, Missouri). In 1898, they established St. Anthony Hospital, the first hospital in the Oklahoma territory.

In 1947, the order built its motherhouse, with its landmark yellow steeple, on a bluff overlooking the One Hundred and Two River. In 1963 they opened the Mount Alverno Academy for high school girls on land next to the motherhouse. The high school closed in 1971.

== Merger ==
After the middle of the twentieth century, the two congregations began to shrink. In May 1985 the members of both congregations voted to merge. In August 1985 the sisters came together to form the Franciscan Sisters of Mary.

The sisters became early adopters of a focus on sustainability in their investments. The investment firm, Goldman Sachs, notes them among the earliest in a new trend among their clients divesting themselves from fossil fuels.

Concerned Maryville residents seeking to preserve the landmark motherhouse tower sought various uses for it. In 1995 the Missouri Department of Corrections bought the 44-acre (180,000 m^{2}) grounds with the motherhouse and school for the minimum security Maryville Treatment Center that began operations in 1996.

In 2010, the 80-year-old convent was vacated at St. Mary's Hospital in the Richmond Heights suburb of St. Louis, as the sisters moved to smaller quarters or a retirement home.

Twenty hospitals and two nursing homes founded by the congregation are now operated as SSM Health Care (SSMHC) in Illinois, Missouri, Oklahoma, and Wisconsin.
