= Mary Odilia Berger =

German-American religious sister

Mary Odilia Berger, S.S.M. (born Anna Katharina Berger; 30 April 1823 – 17 October 1880) was a German-born Catholic religious sister who founded the Sisters of St. Mary in 1872 in St. Louis, Missouri. The order established and still runs hospitals throughout the Midwestern United States. In 1987 they merged with Sisters of St. Francis of Maryville, another congregation which had branched off from them, and together became the Franciscan Sisters of Mary.

== Early life ==
Anna Katharina Berger was born on 30 April 1823 in Regen, in the Kingdom of Bavaria, the elder of twins. In 1858 she joined the Poor Franciscan Sisters of the Holy Family in Pirmasens, founded by the Blessed Paul Joseph Nardini. She was sent to Paris to raise funds for the new religious congregation.

Once in Paris, Berger took part in the charitable works of the Abbé Peter-Victor Braun, who chose her in 1866 to lead the new religious congregation of Sisters Servants of the Sacred Heart he founded to give continuity to their work. She had to flee Paris, however, when the city was besieged during the Franco-Prussian War. Forced to return to her homeland, she tried to start a new community in Elberfeld in the Rhineland but was forbidden to do so by the government during the Kulturkampf, a period when religious communities feared that they would be abolished by the government. In 1872 she got permission to emigrate to St. Louis, Missouri in the United States through the sponsorship of a family member she had nursed in Elberfield, who had later emigrated to Missouri. She left Germany with four companions from her small religious community.

== St. Louis ==
The women arrived in St. Louis on 16 November of that same year. They were given hospitality at the Ursuline monastery of the city. After two weeks, they were able to rent a second-story attic in a building attached to St. Mary of Victories Church in the center of the city. They quickly began to carry out their mission through visiting the homes of poor to provide nursing care. Berger soon became a familiar sight on the streets of the city, carrying a large basket in which she carried nursing supplies and into which she would slip any donations given to her. It later became of a symbol of the origins for the congregation she founded.

The Sisters had gained nursing experience of the battlefronts of the war with France. This experience was to be of great use as an outbreak of smallpox hit the city a few months after their arrival. They nursed the sick and dying during this plague, even in their own residence. They became known in the area as the "Smallpox Sisters" as a result of their labors.

== Foundress ==
The Sisters organized themselves formally in 1874 as the Sisters of St. Mary, under the Rule of the Franciscan Third Order Regular. They took their name from the church, which shared a door with their living quarters. Mother Odilia was then canonically elected as the Superior General of the new congregation, of which she formally was acknowledged as the foundress.

In 1877 the congregation made the decision to move from home care to institutional nursing. To this end, they borrowed the then-enormous sum of $16,000 to open their first hospital, St. Mary's Infirmary, in St. Louis. The Sisters of St. Mary became the city's primary providers of public health care.

In 1878 Mother Odilia sent thirteen sisters, a third of the congregation, to Canton, Mississippi and Memphis, Tennessee during a Yellow Fever outbreak. Five of the sisters died of the disease; all of them under thirty years of age.

Her congregation was officially recognized by the Archdiocese of St. Louis in October 1880, just days before Mother Odilia's death. She was buried in Calvary Cemetery in St. Louis.

In 1894, a group of seven Sisters were sent to Maryville, Missouri, under the leadership of Mother Mary Augustine Giesen, where they established one of the first hospitals in the region. They chose to separate from their congregation and formed the Sisters of St. Francis of Maryville. That congregation further expanded medical care, establishing the first hospital in the Oklahoma Territory.

== Today ==
In May 1985 the two congregations voted to merge as a new religious institute. This took place in August 1987, with the new congregation taking the name of Franciscan Sisters of Mary.

In 1997, Franciscan Sisters of Mary and four other communities: the Daughters of Charity of St. Vincent de Paul, Society of the Sacred Heart, School Sisters of Notre Dame, and the Sisters of Loretto formed the Sarah Community to address retirement needs and providing long-term care to their members and to the general public.

The congregation, through SSM Health Care, today operates in Illinois, Missouri, Oklahoma and Wisconsin. They administer 23 hospitals, two nursing homes, as well as a rehabilitation center. It also provides home care and a host of additional health-related services.
