= Sisters Servants of the Sacred Heart =

French religious congregation

The Sisters Servants of the Sacred Heart (French: Soeurs Servantes du Sacré Coeur) are a French religious congregation founded in 1866. They currently serve throughout France and Africa. According to their current Superior General, Sister Danièle, their service consists of "serving the Sacred Heart of Jesus through responding to the needs of world wherever they find themselves."

== Foundation ==
The congregation was founded by the Servant of God, Abbé Peter-Victor Braun, in Paris in 1866. Braun, who was a native of Saint-Avold in the Lorraine region, had moved there to meet the spiritual needs of the German-speaking people of his region who were flocking from the farms to the capital at the height of the Industrial Revolution in France to find work. He became a regular confessor at the famed Basilica of Our Lady of Victories in Paris.

In the course of his ministry, Braun also served in a seedy quarter of the city where he became aware of the struggle of the young women there who had come as unskilled workers, especially when they were not able to find work in the factories. He also saw single mothers struggling to survive with their children. With the help of a small group of volunteers he opened a hostel where the young women could find a refuge and place of support. He also opened a day care center so that mothers could find employment by which they could support their families. Additionally home visits were done by his volunteer ladies to the residences of the sick poor to care for them in their need.

By October 1866, Braun had reluctantly concluded that the work had to be entrusted to a congregation of professed Religious Sisters in order to guarantee its continuity. Thus he established three of these volunteers under the leadership of a Bavarian woman, Anna Katherina Berger, as a religious congregation. Berger had come to Paris already a member of a community of Franciscan Sisters in Pirmasens, founded by the Blessed Paul Joseph Nardini. She was appointed as Mother Superior of the small community by Braun, under the name of Mother Mary Odilia. The Rule was adapted from that of Francis de Sales.

== Revolution and exile ==
The sudden outbreak of the Franco-Prussian War in 1870 caused a major change in the future of the small congregation. Rumors of anti-Catholic atrocities by the Paris Commune caused a group of the Sisters to flee to England for safety. They were followed by a larger group, who brought with them Braun, who was suffering from shock resulting from his ministry at the battlefront.

Because of her nationality, the co-founder, Mother Odilia, was forced to return to her native Germany.

The refugees were warmly received by Cardinal Henry Edward Manning, the Archbishop of Westminster, who gave them a small house in the Stratford area of the city. The Sisters quickly established themselves in the East End of London where they began again their mission of helping struggling workers and their families. They also established a hospital.

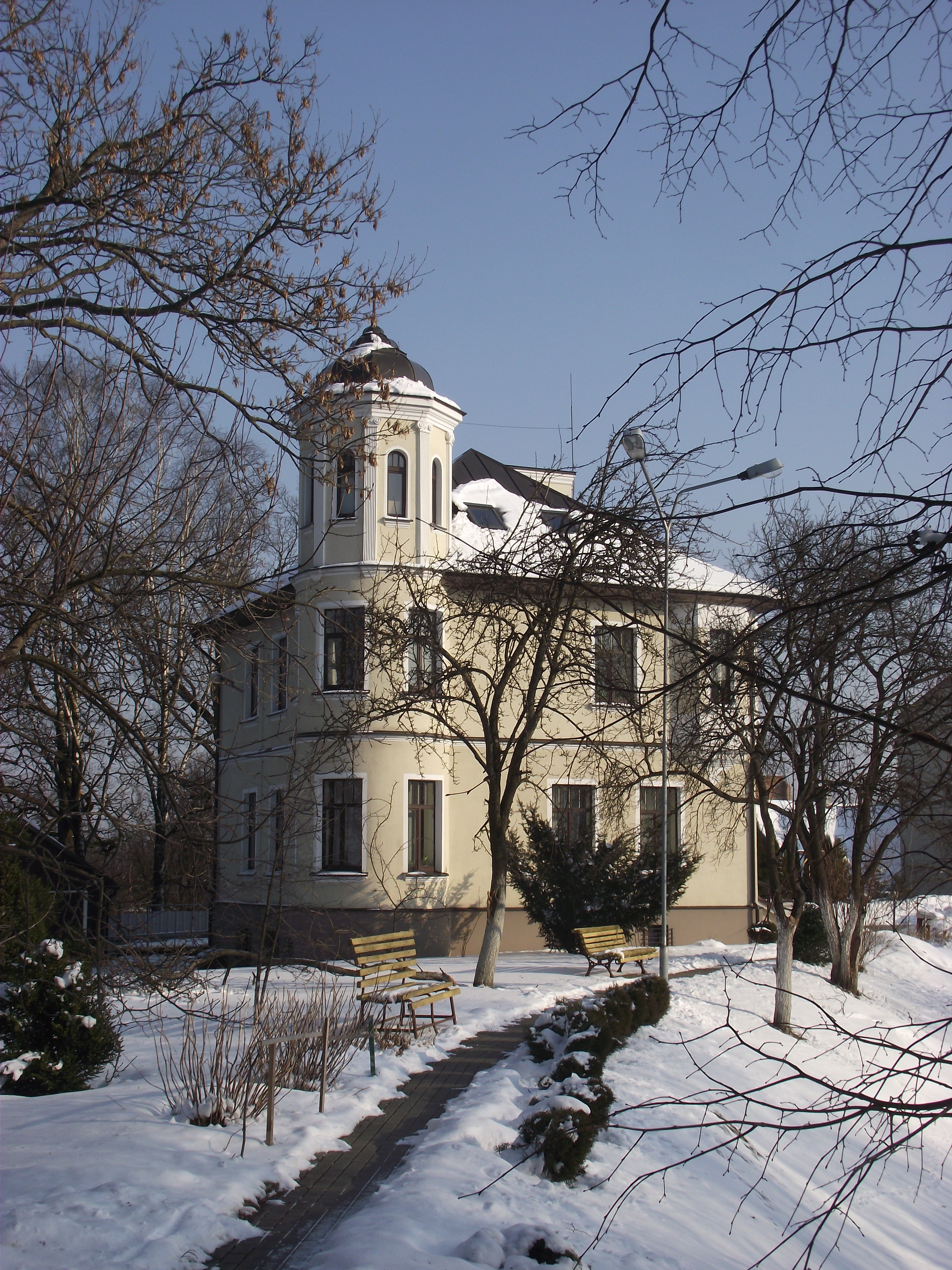
The Sisters Servants of the Sacred Heart of Jesus Congregation

== Re-established in France ==
After the upheavals of the Franco-Prussian War and the subsequent uprisings, with the establishment of peace in France by the late 1870s, some of the French Sisters returned to Paris. They re-established the congregation there and its work.

The Servants had been recognized in the Diocese of Versailles as a congregation in 1868 by the local bishop, Mgr. Jean-Pierre Mabile. Thus when Braun, their founder, died in 1882, in 1884 they chose to move their motherhouse to Versailles, where they arrived on Christmas Day. They soon established services to the needy and the mentally handicapped of the region. Braun's remains were transferred to the chapel of the Motherhouse in 1925.

After a generation, however, differences in vision began to emerge between the English and French Sisters. Under the advice of Cardinal Herbert Vaughan, in 1902 the majority of the Sisters in England elected to separate from the Servants of the Sacred Heart and to form a new congregation. They took the name of the Sisters of the Sacred Hearts of Jesus and Mary.

== Today ==
The Congregation today has several convents throughout France, such as in Argenteuil, Gennevilliers and Beaucaire. Additionally they serve in two nursing homes in the Department of Aveyron. They have a retreat house in Saint-Gervais. They have a mission in Mali and other African countries. The Sisters from Africa have their formation in Versailles, which serves as the novitiate of the congregation.

In 2003 the Servants of the Sacred Heart formed the Federation of Victor Braun with its two daughter congregations, the English one and an Austrian one. This has been approved by the Holy See. The three congregations now share in several common ministries around the world.

== See also ==
- Mary Odilia Berger
- Sisters of the Sacred Hearts of Jesus and Mary
