= Doris Engelhard =

Sister Doris Engelhard
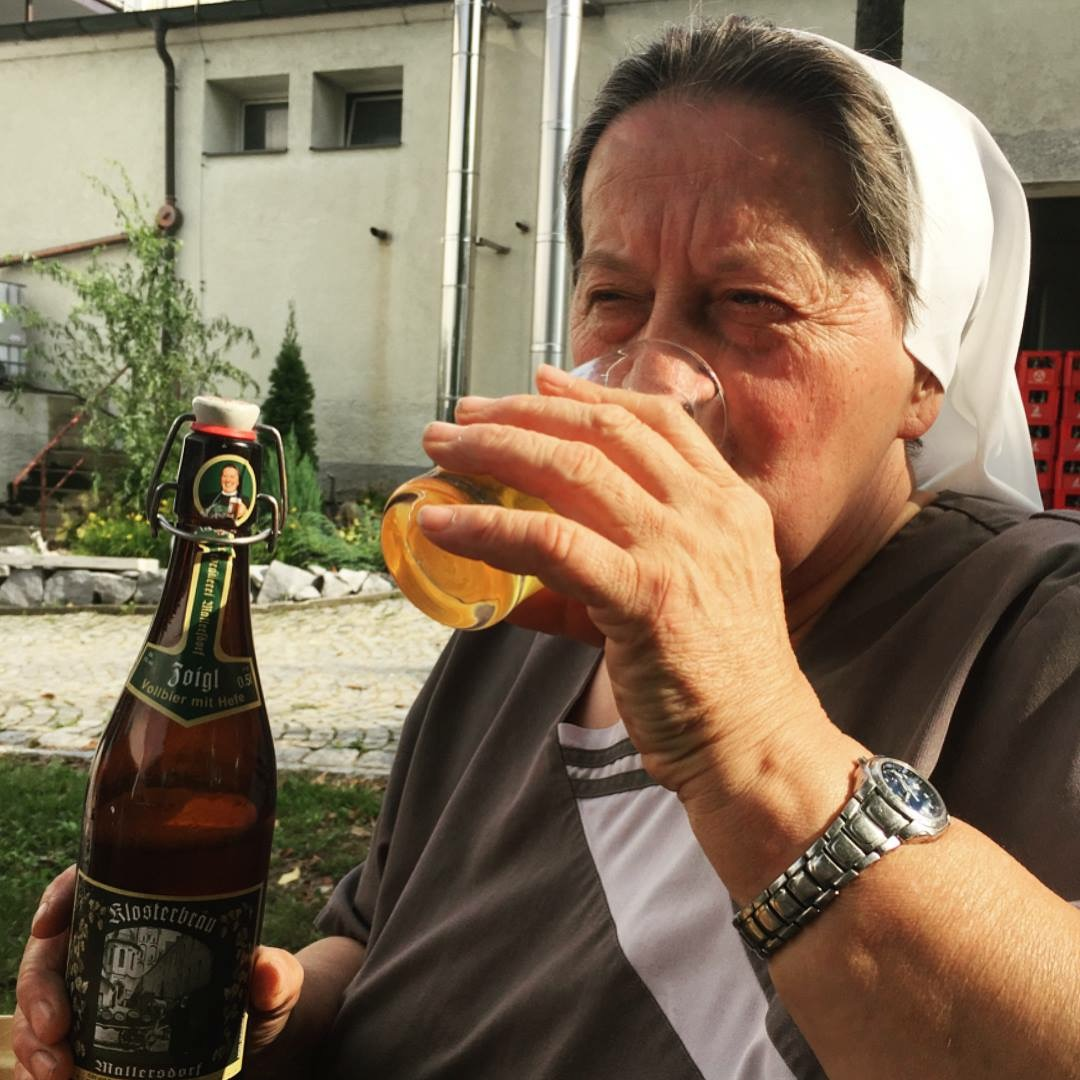
- Engelhard in 2018

Personal life
- Born: Walburga Engel; 1949 (age 76–77) Herrieden, Germany

Religious life
- Religion: Roman Catholic

Doris Engelhard (née Walburga Engelhard; born 1949) is a German religious sister of the Congregation of the Poor Franciscan Sisters of the Holy Family and a brewmaster. Engelhard brews her beer in the Kloster Mallersdorf, and feels that "brewing is her way of serving God." Engelhard is the last nun working in Europe as a brewmaster.

== Early life ==
Engelhard was born Walburga Engel in 1949 in Herrieden, Bavaria.

== Biography ==
Engelhard is a sister of the Poor Franciscan Sisters of the Holy Family. In 1961, Engelhard started at Kloster Mallersdorf as a student. The sisters of this congregation also helped take care of her sick mother. Engelhard wanted to be a religious sister after her experience, but her father felt she could pursue more lucrative career choices. So she thought about studying agriculture and then at the suggestion of the superior, studied brewing. She began her postulancy in 1966 and made her vows in 1969. In 1975, she became the brewmaster in Kloster Mallersdorf, taking over from another sister who had been brewing there since the 1930s. In 1977, she was brewing 3,300 pints a year. Today, Mallersdorf brews about 80,000 gallons of beer a year. The beer brewed at Mallersdorf is not exported and is only consumed locally. The beer is untreated and needs to be drunk while it is still fresh.
