= Mallersdorf-Pfaffenberg =

- Municipality
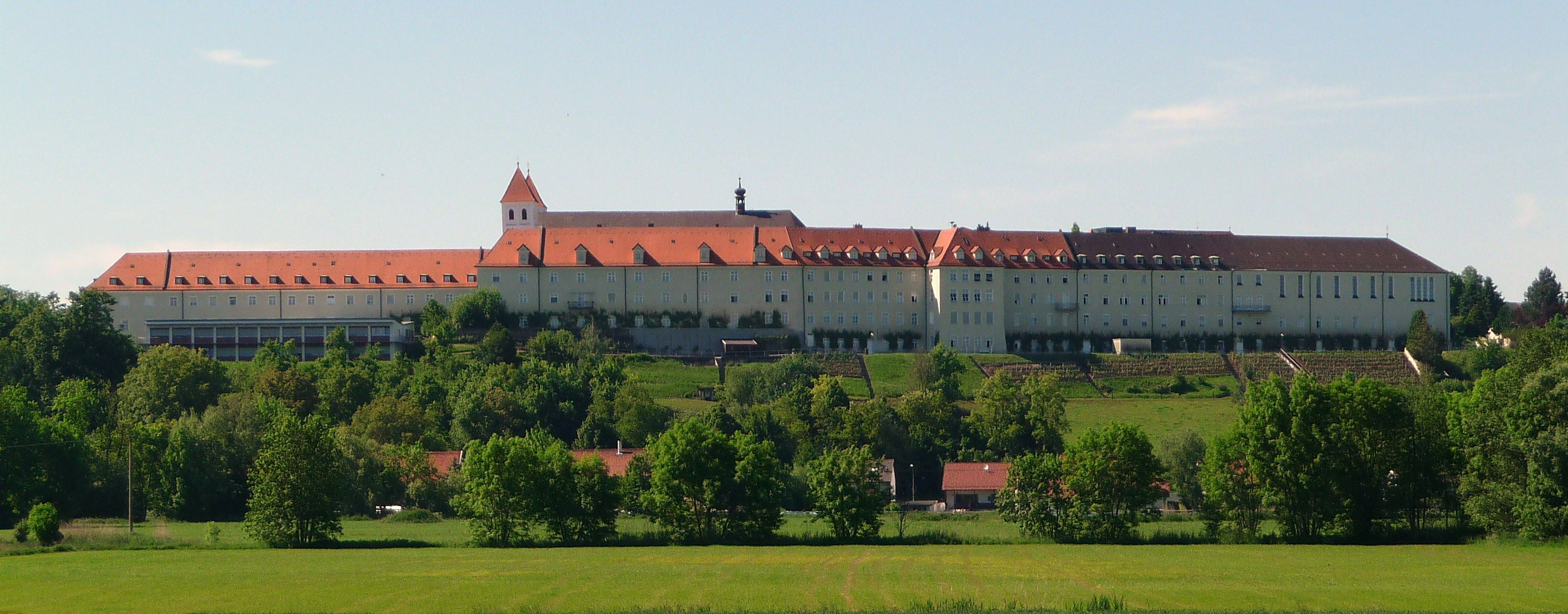
- Mallersdorf Abbey

- Coat of arms

- Location of Mallersdorf-Pfaffenberg within Straubing-Bogen district
- Interactive map of Mallersdorf-Pfaffenberg
- Location within Germany Location within Bavaria
- Coordinates: 48°46′N 12°14′E
- Country: Germany
- State: Bavaria
- Admin. region: Niederbayern
- District: Straubing-Bogen
- Subdivisions: 9 Ortsteile

Government
  - Mayor (2020–26): Christian Dobmeier (CSU)

Area
  - Total: 72.56 km^{2} (28.02 sq mi)
- Elevation: 411 m (1,348 ft)

Population (2025-12-31)
  - Total: 6,670
  - Density: 91.9/km^{2} (238/sq mi)
- Time zone: UTC+01:00 (CET)
  - Summer (DST): UTC+02:00 (CEST)
- Postal codes: 84066
- Dialling codes: 08772
- Vehicle registration: SR
- Website: www.mallersdorf-pfaffenberg.de

Mallersdorf-Pfaffenberg (German pronunciation: [ˈmalɐsdɔʁf ˈpfafn̩bɛʁk]; Central Bavarian: Mollaschdorf-Pfoffaberg) is a municipality in the district of Straubing-Bogen in Bavaria, Germany and has around 7,000 inhabitants.

Mallersdorf-Pfaffenberg is located in the heart of Bavaria in the south of Germany. The medieval cities of Regensburg and Landshut are within a 30 km radius and even the major cities Munich (München) and Nürnberg are around 100 km away.

The town is well known for the Mallersdorf Abbey, which exists since the 12th century. The Franciscan order of the "Mallersdorfer Schwestern" is busy around the world. Also Pope Benedict XVI enjoyed his vacations here.

== Coat of arms ==
- Mallersdorf (right): The arms were granted in 1803 to the former Benedictine Abbey. The eagle of St. John, the patron saint of the abbey, was used on seals of the abbey since 1495. In 1938 it was attempted to remove the golden nimbus around the head as well as the lettering, but the town never changed the arms.
- Pfaffenberg (left): The arms were granted in 1558 by Duke Albrecht V. of Bavaria. The field is taken from the arms of the Lords of Moosburg, as the town was a possession of these counts in the Middle Ages. The mountain is canting (Berg). The plough iron is a local symbol and stands for agriculture. Even though the iron is often misinterpreted and misdrawn, the arms have never changed since.

== History ==
The history of the village Mallersdorf goes back to the Roman times, because the first castle, named "Madilhardisdorf" had been established on the foundation of a Roman fort. The name goes back to Mathilde von Lupburg, the 9th abbess of the Reichsstift Niedermünster in Regensburg who owned extensive estates in the area. During the Carolingian's time Mallersdorf belonged to the county of Kirchberg. The counts Heinrich and Ernst donated a cloister in 1107, which was first mentioned in a document in 1129, with the confirmation of the donation by emperor Lothar III. The Latin school, which was controlled by Benedictine monks in the cloister of Mallersdorf on the Johannisberg, operated there from 1109 to 1803. Mallersdorf gained a great reputation in the scientific area due to its large library. The honorary title "sedes sapientiae" (seat of wisdom) testifies this position. In the course of the Säkularisation the cloister was converted into a farm with brewery. The library, as well as valuable sacred objects, was brought to Munich. The cloister had a resurgence in 1869 as a franziscan order, the "Sisters of Mallersdorf"( established her mother's house there.)

In 1972 the places Mallersdorf, Pfaffenberg, Holztraubach, Ascholtshausen, Oberellenbach, Oberlindhart were united to the market Mallersdorf-Pfaffenberg. The municipalities of Niederlindhart, Haselbach and Upfkofen came on 1 January 1978. On 1 July 1972 Mallersdorf lost the District's Office and came to the administrative district Straubing-Bogen. Therefore, the sign MAL disappeared mainly from the streets.

== Partnership ==
Mallersdorf-Pfaffenberg established town partnerships with Paderno del Grappa in Italy and Jedlicze in Poland. Godparenthood was taken in 1985 for the expelled Sudeten-German from the village of Krajková, formerly Gossengrun, in present-day Sokolov District.

== Places of interest ==
=== Cloister of Mallersdorf ===
The franciscan cloister of Mallersdorf which pursues a secondary school is built on a hill above the idyllic Labertal (Laber-valley). The basilica affiliated to the cloister was begun in 1109 and received her today's rococo equipment in the middle of the 18th century. In the parish church Saint Johannes there is a high altar of Ignaz Günther. The order was founded by Paul Josef Nardini, who was venerated at 19 December 2005 and beatified at 22 October 2006 by Pope Benedict XVI at the cathedral at Speyer, Germany.

=== Jewish monument ===
Near Pfaffenberg is a Jewish monument. It was established in 1947 and was financed by donations of Jewish inhabitants of the region. It marks a tomb for 67 prisoners who had been force-marched from the concentration camp Buchenwald and were shot by German soldiers, before they could be freed by the allies.

== Education ==
- Burkhart's High School
- St. Martin Elementary School and Secondary School
- Special School Saint Benedikt
- Nardini Secondary School for Girls
- Academy for Social Educational Theory
- Technical High School for Nursing
- courses of the adult education program
- music school

== Public facilities ==
- district's hospital of Mallersdorf
- Bavarian Red Cross's retirement home
- kindergarten "the guardian angel"
- kindergarten "Saint Elisabeth"
