= Peter-Victor Braun =

French Catholic priest (1825-1882)

Servant of God Peter-Victor Braun
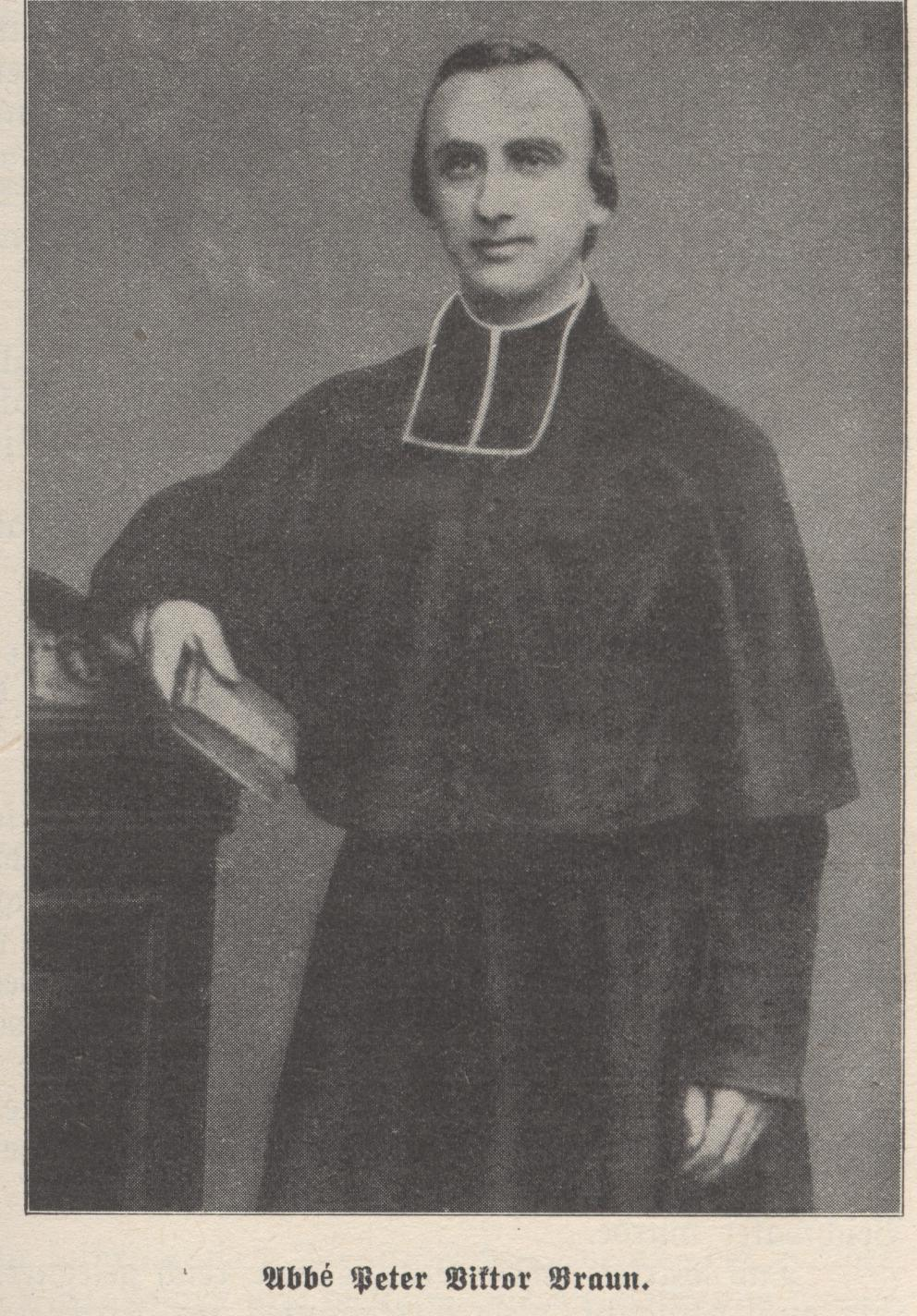
- Born: 5 June 1825
- Died: 18 May 1882)

Peter-Victor Braun, (5 June 1825 – 18 May 1882) was a French Catholic priest who ministered to the poor of Paris. His work laid the foundations for the establishment of several different congregations of religious sisters who now serve worldwide. The cause for his beatification was opened in France in 1991, and was accepted for investigation by the Holy See in 2007.

== Early life ==
Victor Braun (as he called himself) was a native of Saint-Avold in the Lorraine region of France. A few years after his ordination for the Diocese of Metz, he moved to Paris to meet the spiritual needs of the German-speaking people of his region who were flocking from the farms to the capital at the height of the Industrial Revolution in France to find work. He became a regular confessor at the famed Basilica of Our Lady of Victories in Paris.

In the course of his ministry, Braun also served in a seedy quarter of the city where he became aware of the struggle of the young women there who had come as unskilled workers, especially when they were not able to find work in the factories. He also saw single mothers struggling to survive with their children. With the help of a small group of volunteers he opened a hostel where the young women could find a refuge and place of support. He also opened a day care center so that mothers could find employment by which they could support their families. Additionally home visits were done by his volunteer ladies to the residences of the sick poor to care for them in their need.

== Founder ==
By October 1866, Braun had reluctantly concluded that the work had to be entrusted to a congregation of religious sisters in order to guarantee its continuity. Thus he established three of these volunteers under the leadership of a Bavarian woman, Mary Odilia Berger, as a religious congregation, the Sœurs Servantes du Sacré-Cœur de Jésus. Berger had come to Paris already a member of a community of Franciscan Sisters in Pirmasens, founded by the Blessed Paul Joseph Nardini. She was appointed as Mother superior of the small community by Braun. Braun expressed his vision for the congregation in these words: "The purpose of our congregation is to bring the love and compassion of the Sacred Heart of Jesus to all those we meet in our service of love."

== Revolution and exile ==
The sudden outbreak of the Franco-Prussian War in 1870 caused a major change in the future of the small congregation. Rumors of anti-Catholic atrocities by the Paris Commune caused a group of the Sisters to flee to England for safety. They were followed by a larger group, who brought with them Braun, who was suffering from shock resulting from his ministry at the battlefront. Because of her nationality, the co-founder, Mother Odilia, was forced to return to her native Germany.

The refugees were warmly received by Henry Edward Manning, the Archbishop of Westminster, who gave them a small house in the Stratford area of the city. Braun and the sisters quickly established themselves in the East End of London where they began again their mission of helping struggling workers and their families.

After the upheavals of the Franco-Prussian War and the subsequent uprisings, with the establishment of peace in France, Braun and some of the French sisters returned to their homeland. They re-established the congregation there and its work. In 1873 he went to Austria where he started a new congregation of sisters in the same form of work and with the same name as their French counterparts, German: Dienerinnen des heiligsten Herzens Jesu, whose motherhouse is in Vienna.

Braun died in the Parisian suburb of Argenteuil on 18 May 1882. The Servants had been recognized in the Diocese of Versailles as a congregation in 1868 by the local bishop, Jean-Pierre Mabile. Thus, in need of larger space, they chose to move their motherhouse to Versailles, where they arrived on Christmas Day 1884. They soon established services to the needy and the mentally handicapped of the region. Braun's remains were transferred to the chapel of the motherhouse in 1925.

== Legacy ==
The sisters who remained in England later chose to separate and formed a new congregation in 1903, the Sisters of the Sacred Hearts of Jesus and Mary.

In 2003 the three congregations stemming from Braun's work formed the Victor Braun Federation. Made up of the three congregations which trace their roots to Braun's original group, the members are: the Sœurs Servantes du Sacré-Cœur de Jésus, the Dienerinnen des heiligsten Herzens Jesu, and the Sisters of the Sacred Hearts of Jesus and Mary.
