= Maryville Treatment Center =

Prison in northwestern Missouri, U.S.

Coordinates: 40°20′45″N 94°48′48″W

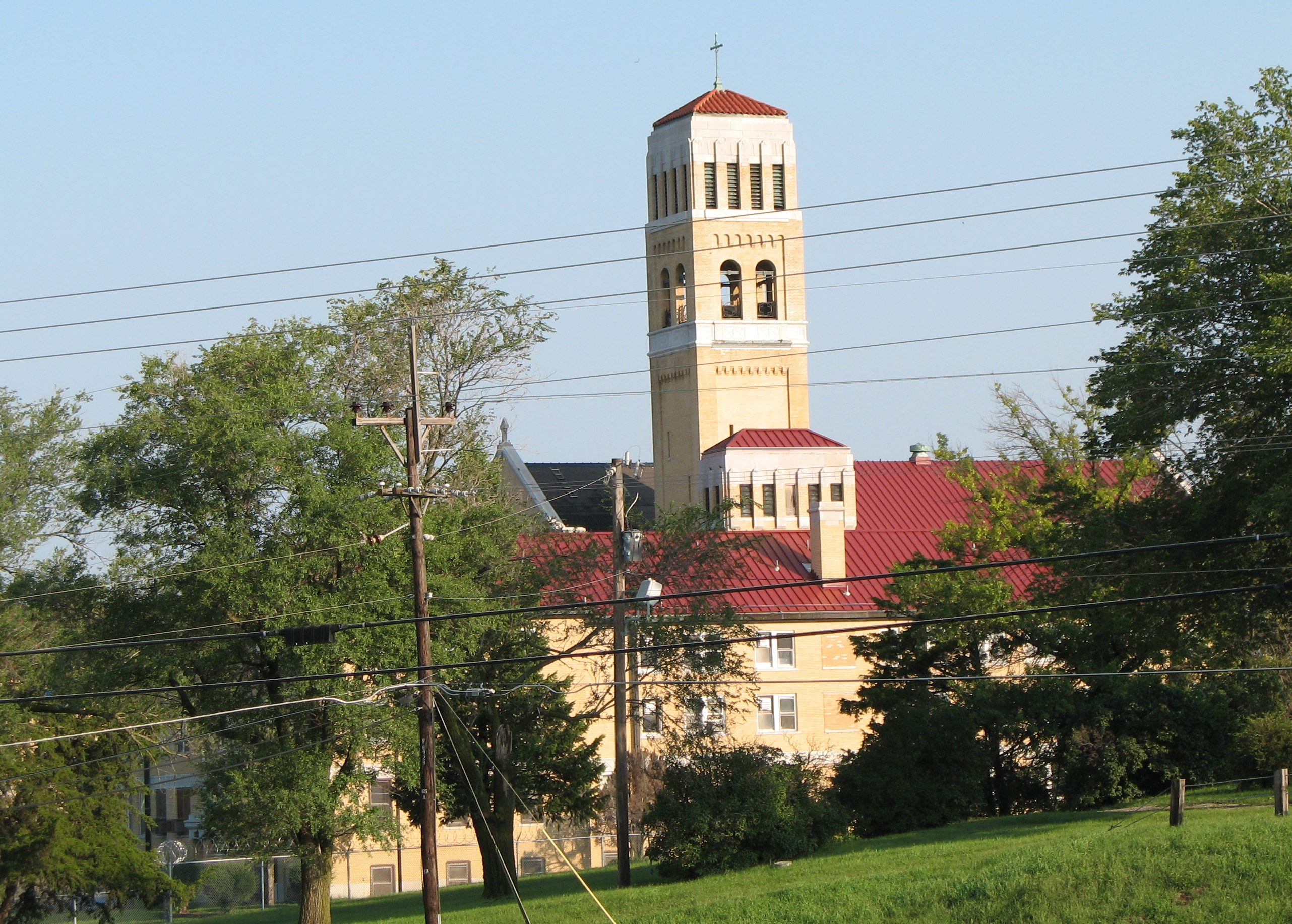
- Maryville Treatment Center at Mount Alverno on the bluffs above the 102 River.
- Interactive map of Maryville Treatment Center
- Location: Maryville, Missouri
- Status: open
- Security class: minimum
- Capacity: 561
- Opened: 1996
- Managed by: Missouri Department of Corrections

Maryville Treatment Center is a Missouri Department of Corrections minimum security prison for male inmates on the grounds of the former Mount Alverno motherhouse of the Sisters of St. Francis of Maryville in Polk Township, Nodaway County, just outside Maryville, Missouri.

The facility is a (custody level 2) facility with a designed capacity to house 561 offenders.

The center currently provides the 561 offenders housed there with at least six-months of treatment and behavior modification as part of the Offenders Under Treatment (OUT) Program and the Board Substance Abuse Program (BDSAP).

The Franciscan motherhouse was built in 1947 and its distinctive yellow belltower on the bluff above the One Hundred and Two River is a distinctive landmark. The Sisters founded and operated Maryville's St. Francis Hospital. In 1963 they opened the Mount Alverno High School for Girls next to the motherhouse. The school closed in 1971. In 1985 the order abandoned the motherhouse and school when they merged with Sisters of St. Mary to form the Franciscan Sisters of Mary with the headquarters in St. Louis, Missouri.

In June 1995 Missouri leased the 44 acres (180,000 m^{2}) and the DOC "treatment" began operations on December 3, 1996.

== History ==
=== Prison ===
In July 1995, Western Missouri Correctional Center associate superintendent William D. Burgess was appointed superintendent of the Maryville Treatment Center. The 525-bed site was due to open later that year as a minimum security prison for nonviolent offenders with substance abuse problems.
