= St. Mary of Victories Church =

Historic church in Missouri, United States

- U.S. National Register of Historic Places
- St. Louis Landmark
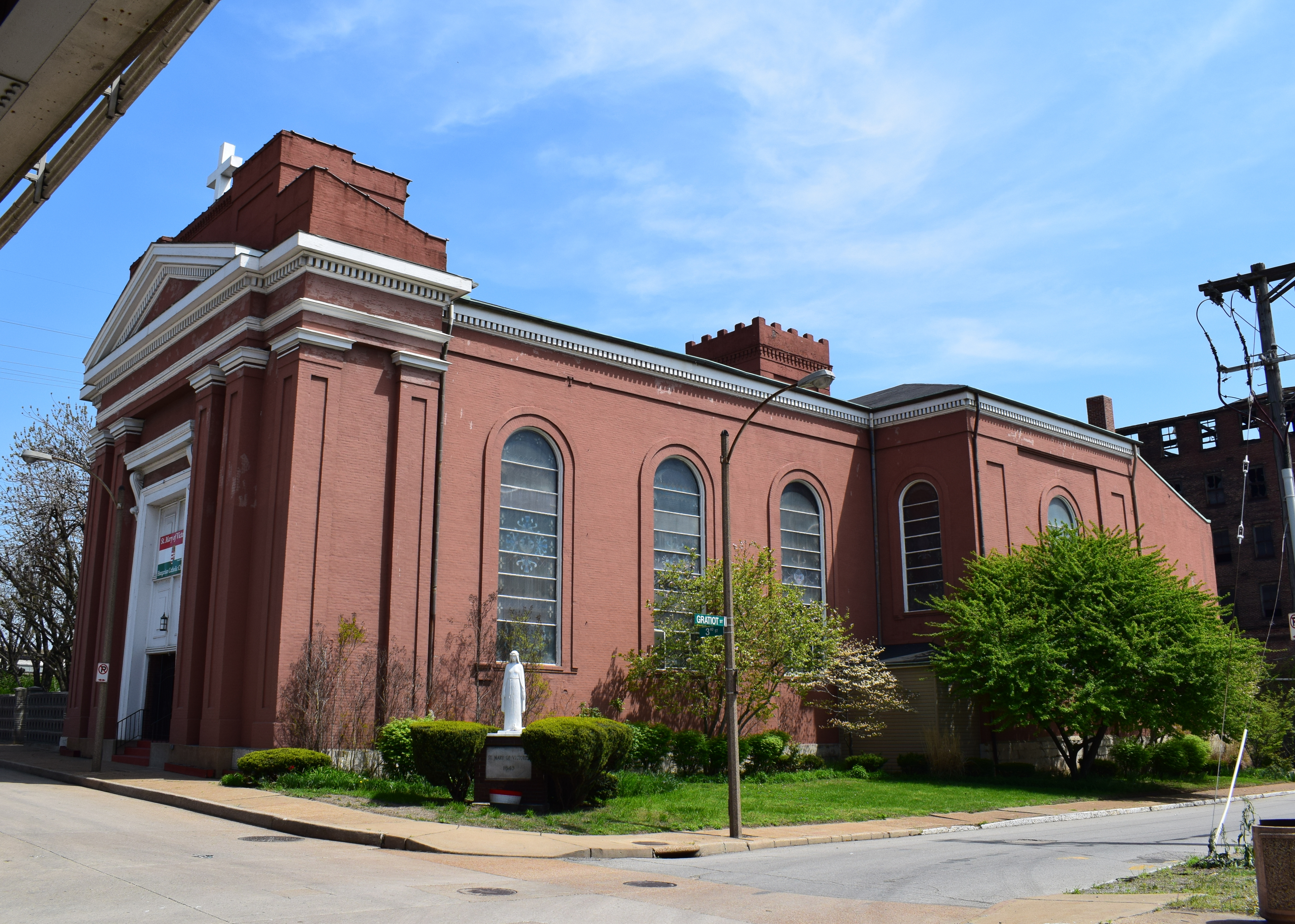
- Exterior

- Location within St. Louis Location within Missouri Location within the United States
- Location: 744 S. 3rd St., St. Louis, Missouri
- Coordinates: 38°37′5″N 90°11′26″W
- Area: less than one acre
- Built: 1843
- Architect: George I. Barnett and Franz Saler
- Architectural style: Mannerist
- NRHP reference No.: 80004510
- Added to NRHP: August 28, 1980

The Church of St. Mary of Victories is a historic Catholic church in St. Louis, Missouri, in the Kosciusko neighborhood south of the Gateway Arch. It was established in 1843, and was the second Catholic church built in the city. It has been listed on the National Register of Historic Places.

== History ==
The church was built to serve the needs of about 500 families who had emigrated from Germany. It is located in the hub of the pioneer "Chouteau's Landing" District of Kosciusko, where the German immigrants settled in pre-Civil War era St. Louis. It took its name from a noted feast day proclaimed by Pope Pius V to celebrate the victory of the Christian Navy over Islamic forces in the Battle of Lepanto, off the coast of Italy in the Adriatic Sea in 1571. The church is also a consecrated church (1866) at the direction of Pope Pius IX. It also has an indulgenced High Altar (where hundreds of relics of saints are entombed) bestowed by Pope Leo XIII in the late 19th century.

St. Mary's served as the first ethnic parish and spiritual home to the German Roman Catholic population of the city for the next century. It also provided a temporary home to a small community of Lebanese immigrants in the 20th-century, who went on to found a church in their own—present-day St. Raymond Maronite Cathedral in LaSalle Park neighborhood. St. Raymond's is now the Cathedral for the Maronite Eparchy west of the Mississippi River in the USA. Its former Archbishop, Most. Rev. Robert J. Shaheen, built the present St. Raymond's Cathedral under his pastoral administration.

The 1950s saw the departure from the city of a large number of the families whose German ancestors had worshiped there. They were replaced by a large community of refugees from Hungary after World War II and the 1956 Hungarian Uprising. They gave new life to the parish, which became unofficially called the "Hungarian Church" (Hungarian: Magyar Templom).

The church was listed on the National Register of Historic Places in 1980. It is also a consecrated Roman Catholic church; that is, the Vatican has bestowed the consecration privilege on the church itself by Pope Pius IX, performed with a specific ritual by St. Louis Archbishop Peter Richard Kenrick in 1866. Archbishop Kenrick anointed each of the interior walls of the church with chrism oil per the consecration ritual, and today, brass wall cross sconces (candleholders) are displayed on the walls noting the consecration locations. While all Catholic churches are blessed, only a few in a diocese are consecrated, and it assures the church may only be used for Roman Catholic worship and for no other purpose. The main altar of the church also has an Indulgence attached to it by Pope Leo XIII in 1896, granting temporal remission of sins at the time of death for those Catholics saying the specific prayers, and dying in the state of grace.

In 2005, the church closed as an official parish and opened as a chapel.

== Architecture ==
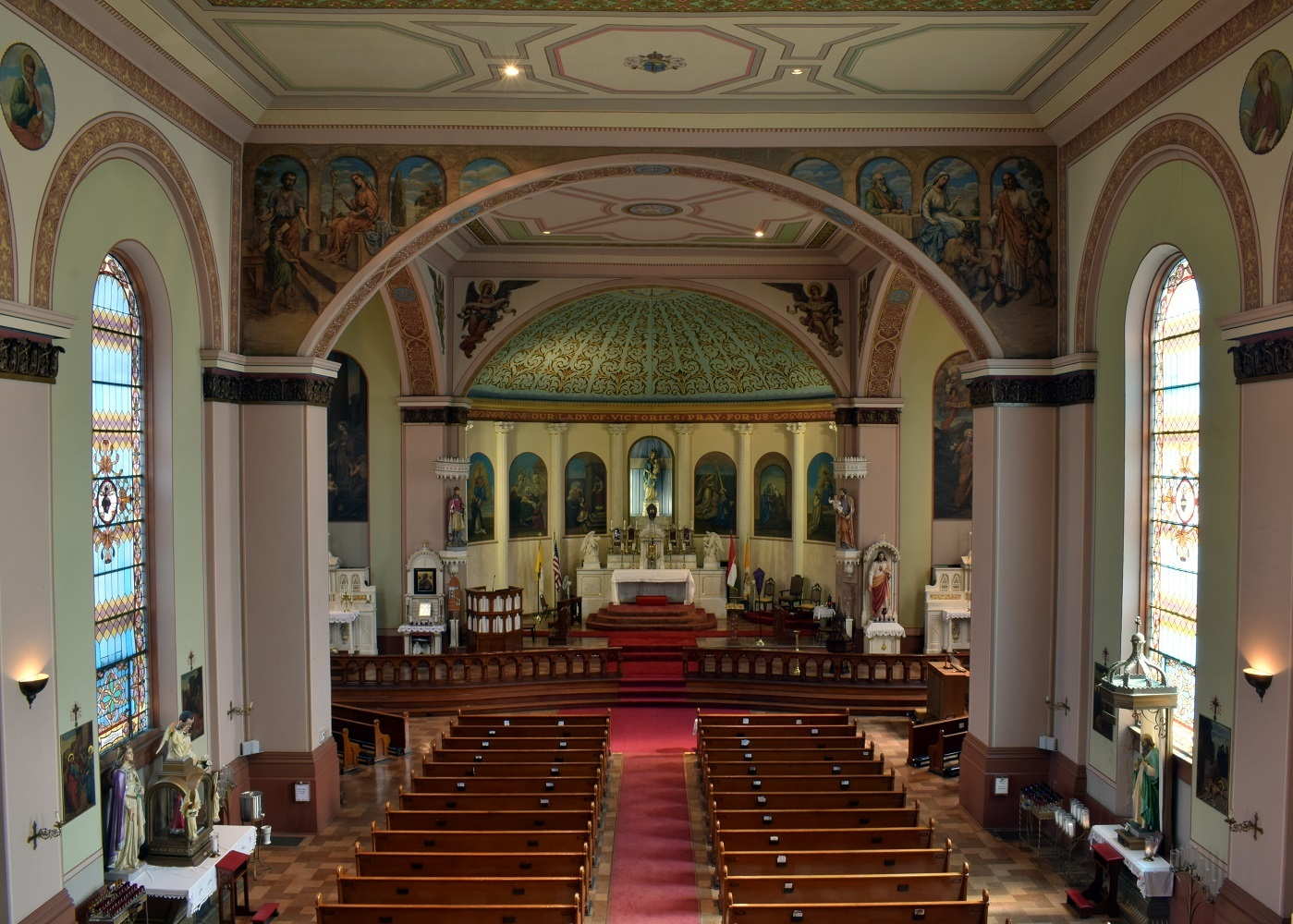
Interior

George I. Barnett and Franz Saler, the distinguished architects of St. Mary's Church, designed it in accordance with that of the early 16th-Century Mannerist style. The nave is rectangular and, with the transept, forms a cross with the sanctuary at its head. The choir loft is located on the second tier of the two-tier balcony at the rear of the church. Its ornate wooden-carved organ case and stenciled display pipes are among the oldest in St. Louis.

Eight tall stained-glass windows with rounded frames grace the nave and the transept, complementing the high arch of the sanctuary. The Egyptian-style doorway to the church is framed by two massive pillars that hold up the heavy wooden cross above the entrance.

The interior of St. Mary of Victories is also remarkable as the first interior in a St. Louis church whose design was based upon liturgical studies. It was developed and constructed by Max Schneiderhahn, the city's first professional church artist. Himself a German immigrant, Schneiderhahn studied at a German university and two monasteries, bringing the craftsmanship tradition of liturgical art to the St. Louis area. The altars, statuary, steepled baptismal font, communion rail, carvings and frescoes were all conceived and executed by Schneiderhahn, who also painted the Stations of the Cross.

Within its hallowed walls are also other liturgical art treasures and fixtures donated at later dates by other Roman Catholic religious orders and communities in the metro St. Louis area, particularly those of German origin, including the School Sisters of Notre Dame, the Franciscan Sisters of Mary, the Mill Hill Fathers, and the group promoting the canonization of Blessed Francis X. Seelos, C.SS.R., a Bavarian Redemptorist immigrant priest who worked with mid-19th century German immigrants in St. Louis, Baltimore, and New Orleans. (His statue, minted by the Vatican Statuary Foundry, stands on a reconstructed side altar made of the communion rail from the old St. Malachy's Church in the Mill Creek Valley (now demolished), once used by the later-dated, now-closed St. Timothy Parish in Affton, MO. A copy of Bl. Seelos' bronze death mask, one of five in the world, is also on permanent display).

The Hungarian Roman Catholic faith community also honors the famed Joseph Cardinal Mindszenty of Hungary with a carved white marble plaque in the sanctuary, noting his visit to this church in the 1970s. The late Cardinal-Archbishop of Budapest-Esztergom participated in a special Mass, seminar and dinner at the visit sponsored by the parish and the Cardinal Mindszenty Foundation of the U.S. Mindszenty is regarded as a great hero to the Hungarian people around the world for his resistance to atheistic Communism and totalitarianism in the 1950s, as well as to those of other nations. The Hungarian Ladies Society of the church has also embroidered most of the decorative altar linens used on its many altars and shrines throughout the liturgical year.

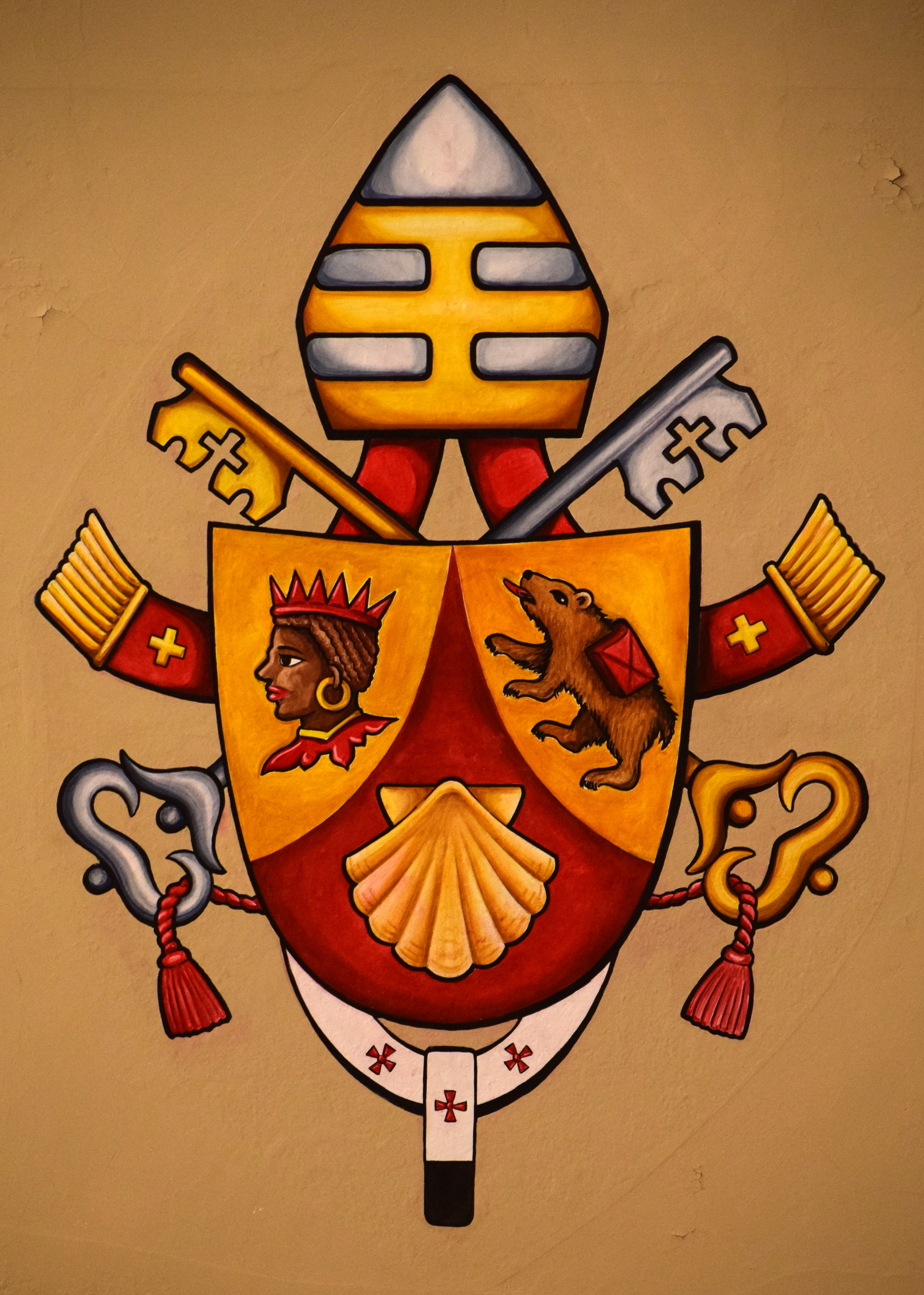
Benedict XVI's coat of arms as it appears in the church

Two noted historically recent popes are also commemorated, featuring their stenciled coat of arms on the ornate painted ceiling of Old St. Mary's. Pope John Paul II has his blue-and-gold coat of arms over the church crossing (featuring the old papal tiara, or three-tiered crown), while Pope Benedict XVI (formerly Joseph Cardinal Ratzinger), has his papal coat-of-arms displayed over the choir loft featuring the more-updated mitre in place of the tiara. (As the first German-background church in the Archdiocese, it was as of 2015 the only parish with Pope Benedict XVI's coat-of-arms on public display in the fabric of the church building).

== Historic connections ==
It was in St. Mary of Victories that the Blessed Francis Xavier Seelos, C.Ss.R., made his Missouri preaching debut. Together with his Redemptorist companions, Fathers Schneider, Jacob and Gulielm, Seelos preached a parish mission in German from the first to fifteenth of October 1865. The side altar in the south middle portion of the nave of the church honors his role in the historic parish's development.

In 1872, five women came to St. Louis from Germany, under the leadership of Mother Mary Odilia Berger, having been unable to live out their lives of religious dedication and service due to the policies of the German government known as the Kulturkampf. They found lodging in an attic in the church complex, having the same door to their residence as to the church. They organized themselves in 1874 as a religious congregation under the name of the Franciscan Sisters of St. Mary, taking their name from the church. The healing and therapeutic ministry of their Order continues in today's SSM HEALTH CARE SYSTEMS, a St. Louis-based hospital/nursing organization which operates hospitals and medical care facilities throughout the Midwest and the Mid-South. A bronze plaque mounted on the back wall to the left of the entrance honors the American foundation of the Sisters of St. Mary.

== External source ==
- St. Mary of Victories Website.
