= Mary Augustine Giesen =

Hospital founder in Missouri, U.S.

Mary Augustine Giesen (December 6, 1860 - February 25, 1950), founded the Sisters of St. Francis of Maryville which founded and operated St. Francis Hospital in Maryville, Missouri.

She was born in Union Hill, Minnesota. She joined the Sisters of St. Mary in St. Louis, Missouri. In 1894 she moved to Maryville, Missouri to found and operate the town's first hospital (which is one of only two hospitals north of St. Joseph, Missouri in the Platte Purchase area of northwest Missouri). They formed a separate congregation, the Sisters of St. Francis of Maryville. In 1947 they built the landmark Mount Alverno motherhouse on the bluffs above the One Hundred and Two River just east of Maryville. She is buried in Maryville.

In 1985 her order rejoined the Sisters of St. Mary to form the Franciscan Sisters of Mary which is headquartered in St. Louis and operates 20 hospitals in Illinois, Missouri, Oklahoma and Wisconsin.
