= Poor Franciscan Sisters of the Holy Family =

The Poor Franciscan Sisters of the Holy Family (German: Arme Franziskanerinnen von der Heiligen Familie) are a congregation of religious sisters of the Franciscan Third Order Regular. They were founded in Pirmasens, Germany, in 1855 by the Blessed Paul Joseph Nardini. They are therefore commonly known as the Nardini Sisters, or the Mallersdorfer Sisters from the German town where they are headquartered.

== Origins ==
The Blessed Paul Nardini had been born out of wedlock in 1821 in the Palatinate, then within the Kingdom of Bavaria. He had suffered a deprived childhood until he was adopted by a great-aunt and her Italian husband. He later developed a strong calling to the priesthood, and began the studies needed to prepare for this. He was sent by Johannes von Geissel, the Bishop of Speyer, to do his study of theology at LMU Munich, where he graduated summa cum laude. Despite the encouragement of his professors to remain at the university and teach, Nardini was determined to be a parish priest.

After his ordination in 1846, Nardini served in various positions in the vicinity of Speyer, until on 17 February 1851 he was entrusted by the bishop with the pastoral care of the poor parish of Pirmasens. It would be a post he held until his death. The pastorate of Pirmasens was a difficult post as it was in a town divided between a Catholic population and the dominant Protestant populace. The Catholics suffered economic discrimination, forced into menial jobs, with their children reduced to begging on the streets. Their new pastor was determined to improve the conditions of his congregation. He began to develop programs of charity to meet their needs.

His first thought in providing social care was to invite a community of Religious Sisters to come and care for the Catholics of the city. He was fiercely resisted in this plan by the local town council, composed entirely of Protestants. Nardini, however, held fast and three members of the Sisters of the Holy Redeemer came from their Motherhouse in Niederbronn. They nursed the sick and cared for and educated the children.

== Foundation ==
The modest, rented home occupied by the Sisters was soon filled with sick, neglected elderly people and poverty-stricken street children. To make things worse, the following winter was extremely severe and accompanied by an outbreak of typhoid fever. The Sisters were at the bedside of the sick continuously until they themselves contracted the disease. The superiors at Niederbronn hinted that they were considering withdrawal of the small community of four Sisters. At that same time the government issued a decree forbidding foundations of Sisters based outside Germany. As the Sisters' Motherhouse was located in Alsace, a part of France, they were considered foreigners.

Nardini determined that the only answer to guarantee the continuity of his work was to establish a new congregation committed to it. As a result, when the Superior General of the Sisters recalled one of the Sisters upon a fresh outbreak of typhus, to this end he invited two young local women, Barbara Schwarz and Juliana Michel, members of the Third Order of St. Francis, to move into the little convent. On 2 March 1855 he gave them a religious habit and the religious names of Sister Agatha and Sister Aloysia. Nardini was a member of the Franciscan Third Order himself, and gave them the Rule of the Franciscan Third Order Regular for their way of life. The Sisters of the Holy Redeemer withdrew from the town at that point, entrusting their work to the new community.

== Expansion ==
The early days of the new community were difficult, as Nardini, in his conviction, had acted without the authorization of the bishop. In response to this behavior, his letters to the bishop were left unanswered for months. While the townspeople were supportive, public response outside the city was scathing, with newspaper articles denouncing the action for months. Nevertheless he continued with the project, personally supervising the care and formation of the Sisters, securing their food and lodging, even to the point of depriving himself of a regular evening meal.

On the 10 March 1857, Bishop Nicolaus von Weis finally broke his silence and gave the Poor Franciscan Sisters of the Holy Family the official approval of the Catholic Church. Nardini's oversight and care was not to last long, however. On a frigid, winter night in January 1862, he was called to the bedside of a dying parishioner. As a result of the visit, he contracted pulmonary typhus, from which he died on the 27 January at the age of 40. By then, the congregation already numbered 220 Sisters, working in 35 different locations.

== Today ==
=== Germany ===
After Nardini's death, the Sisters continued to expand and take on new missions throughout southern Germany. Today they operate school and hospitals, and provide the domestic services for two seminaries. The growth of the congregation soon caused the Sisters to outgrow their home in Pirmasens. They began to look for a new home, and found the former Benedictine monastery, Mallersdorf Abbey, in the town of Mallersdorf which had been secularized in 1805. They purchased it from the town in 1869, and made it the new General Motherhouse of the congregation.

=== Romania ===
They began to work in what is now modern Romania in 1864, shortly after the founder's death. They developed to the point that the Sisters there were established as a Province of the congregation. After World War II, while that nation was under the rule of the Communist Party, they lost control of their institutions, but continued to work in them, in the spirit of their founder. After the fall of Communism, they quickly re-established their common life, opening a convent in Oderhei in 1991, which is now the local motherhouse and a center of various services.

=== South Africa ===
In 1955, the Sisters began a mission to the Republic of South Africa. As their nursing qualifications were not recognized by the local authorities, the Sisters had to start training at a local hospital run by the Missionary Benedictine Sisters of Tutzing. On 15 November 1958, the Franciscan Sisters took responsibility for St. Benedict Hospital in a mission station at Nkandla from the Benedictine Sisters, who had founded it in 1939. The mission served 30,000 Zulus in the region. Since then, the Sisters have established orphanages and other hospitals.

Administration of all the hospitals in the nation was taken over by the government in 1976. The Sisters chose to remain working in the institutions they had run as part of the staff. They have since developed ministry to AIDS patients.
