= Mallersdorf Abbey =

Franciscan convent in Mallersdorf-Pfaffenberg, Bavaria

Coordinates: 48°46′42″N 12°15′15″E

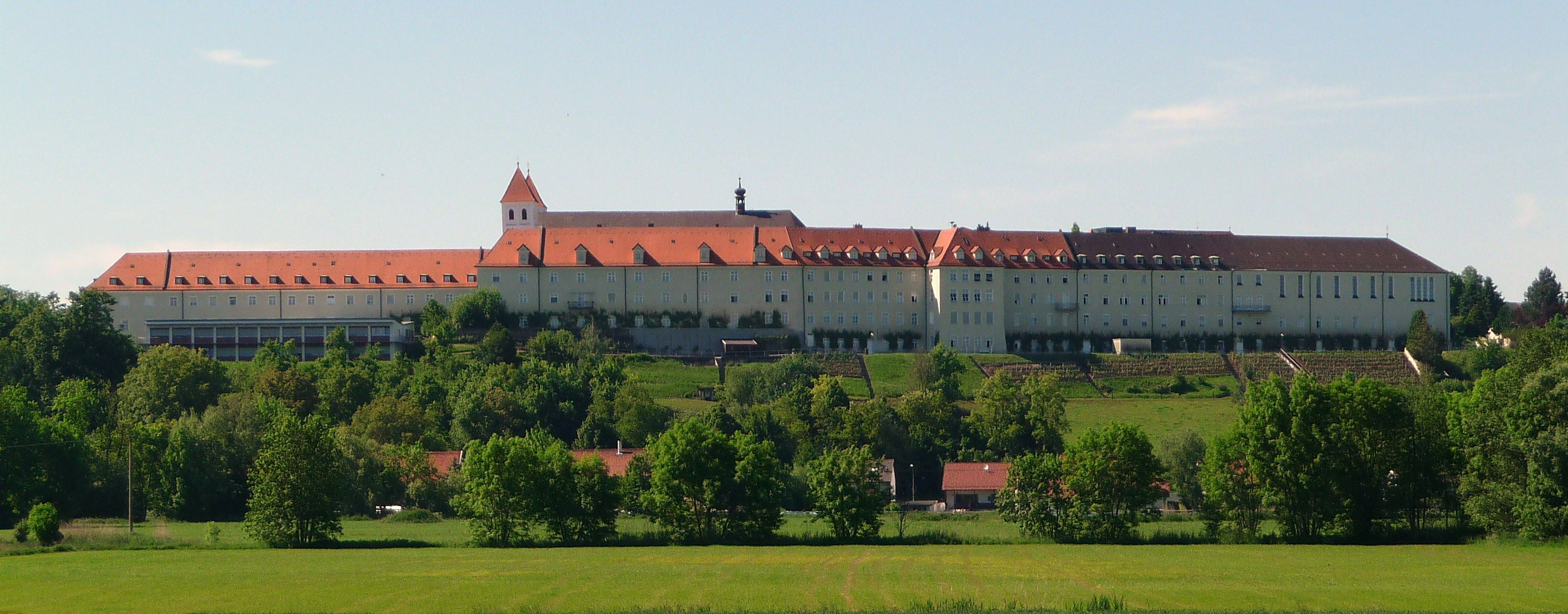
Mallersdorf Abbey

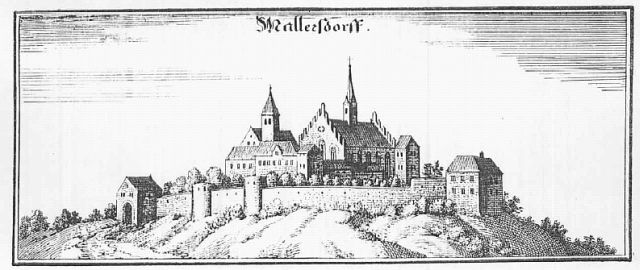
Engraving in der "Topographia Germaniae des Matthaeus Merian" of about 1644

Mallersdorf Abbey (Abtei or Kloster Mallersdorf) was formerly a monastery of the Benedictine Order and is now a Franciscan convent in Mallersdorf-Pfaffenberg in Bavaria.

== History ==
The monastery, dedicated to Saint John the Evangelist, was founded in 1107 by Heinrich of Kirchberg, a ministerialis of Niedermünster in Regensburg, and settled by monks from either the monastery of Michelsberg in Bamberg or St. Emmeram's Abbey in Regensburg.

Under Abbot Eppo (1122-1143) the reforming influences of the monasteries of St. Georgen im Schwarzwald and of Hirsau had a significant impact. At this time the community was subordinated to Otto I, Bishop of Bamberg and placed under the direct protection of Pope Innocent II (1130-1143). In 1136 Abbot Eppo dissolved the double monastery (i.e., including both men and women) which seems to have been there until that time; the women's convent was transferred to nearby Eitting. In the 12th century there was church building in the romanesque style, in the 13th a period of spiritual awakening, and in the 14th the reforms led by Kastl Abbey. In the mid 16th century the abbey narrowly escaped dissolution. The monastic grammar school enjoyed an excellent reputation.

The abbey was finally dissolved in 1803 during the secularisation of Bavaria. The assets and estates were auctioned off. The monastery buildings were used from 1807 as offices for local officials.

Since 1869 Franciscan sisters have lived at the site, and presently run the "Special Academy for Social Pedagogy of the Poor Clares of Mallersdorf" ("Fachakademie für Sozialpädagogik der Armen Franziskanerinnen Mallersdorf"). There is also a Realschule there.

In August 2014, it was reported that Sister Doris Engelhard, a nun at the abbey and a certified master brewer, was the last beer making nun in Europe. She has been brewing beer at the abbey for over 40 years. Brewing at the abbey was revived in 1881. On brewing days, she is excused from morning prayers and starts work at the abbey brew house at 3:30 a.m. Depending on the season, Sister Doris will brew a maibock, a doppelbock, a dark zoigl, or a copper-hued vollbier (lager).

== Benedictine abbots and administrators of Mallersdorf ==
- Burkard (1109-1122)
- Eppo of St. Georgen (1122-1143)
- Emicho (1143-1157)
- Otto (-1172)
- Heinrich I (1180, -1194)
- Adelhoch (1194-1206)
- Dietrich (1206-1226)
- Gerung
- Meinwart
- Ulrich I (-1261)
- Heinrich II (1261-1273)
- Benedikt I (-1279)
- Hermann I (1279-1286)
- Heinrich III (1286-1295)
- Berthold I Vilser (1295-1301)
- Rudiger (1301-1320)
- Bernhard (1320-1327)
- Ulrich II Hintzheimer (1327-1352)
- Konrad von Ellenbach (1353-1356)
- Hermann II (1356-1370)
- Berthold II (1370-1380)
- Heinrich IV Neumarkter (1380-1390)
- Heinrich V Braitenacher (1391-1406)
- Friedrich von Haindling (1406-1410)
- Michel (1410-1413)
- Peter I Grumad (1413-1419)
- Johann I Seetaler (1420-1424)
- Michael I Bogenhauser (1424-1442)
- Peter II Marschalk (1443-1446)
- Johann II Wenderer (1447-1464)
- Andreas I Müllich (1464-1476)
- Erasmus I Perfelder (1476-1495)
- Michael II Eckhart (1495-1518)
- Erasmus II Haunsperger (1518-1538)
- Matthias Diernhofer (1538-1545)
- Johann III Chrysostomus Hirschpeck (1545-1548)
- Gregor Labermayr (1548-1556)
- Wolfgang Hueber (1556-1570)
- Paulus Röhrl (1571-1573)
- Erasmus Hösl (1573-1580)
- Markus Besch (1580-1587)
- Paulus Klocker (1587-1602)
- Eustach Sturm (1602-1619)
- Georg Eiszepf (1619-1630)
- Andreas Pichler (1630-1631)
- Benedikt II Wolf (1631-1661)
- Roman Edstadler (1661-1665)
- Anton Schelshorn (1665-1695)
- Maurus I Kübeck (1695-1723)
- Korbinian Stange (1723-1732)
- Heinrich VI Widman (1732-1758)
- Heinrich VII Madlseder (1758-1779)
- Gregor Schwab (1779-1795)
- Augustin Stielner (1795-1801)
- Maurus II Deigl (1801-1803)

=== Superior Generals ===
- M. Anastasia Glück (1869–1871)
- M. Hieronyma Eder (1871–1903)
- ....
- M. Adolfina Nitzl
- M. Concordia Lehmeier (1953–)
- M. Salesia Eder (–1983)
- M. Ignatia Lautenbacher (1983–1995)
- M. Marion Schnödt (1995–2007)
- M. Hiltrud Baumer (2007–2013)
- M. Jakobe Schmid (from 2013)
