= Abbé =

Title for lower-ranking Catholic clergy in France

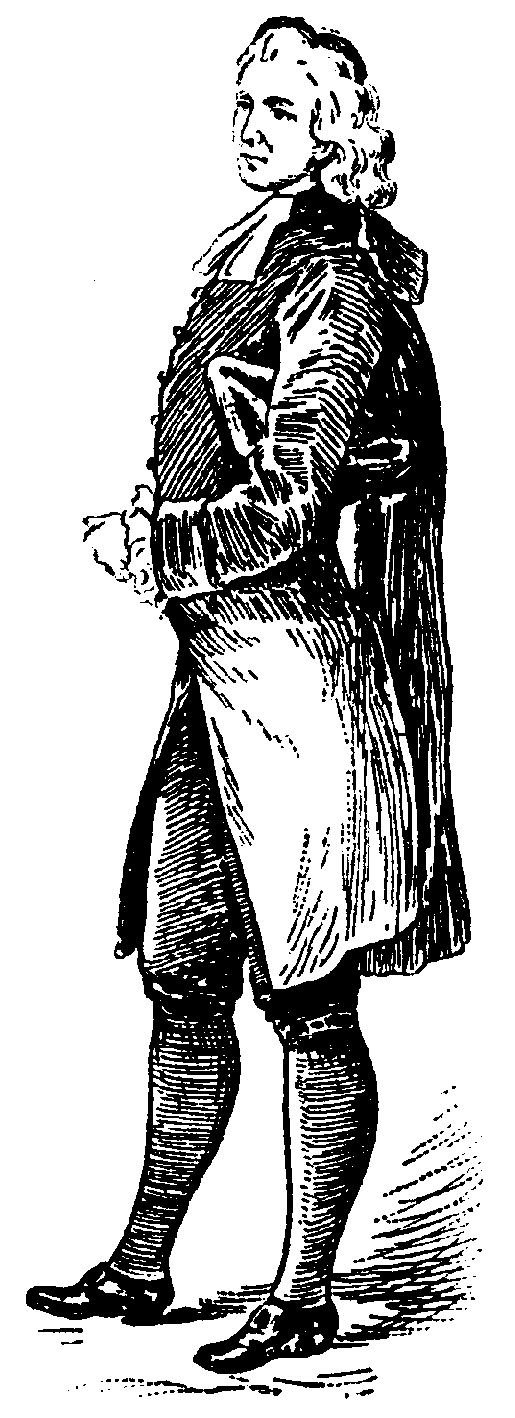
French abbé of the 18th century

Abbé (French: [abe]; from Latin abbas, in turn from Greek ἀββᾶς, abbas, from Aramaic abba, a title of honour, literally meaning "the father, my father", emphatic state of abh, "father") is the French word for an abbot. It is also the title used for lower-ranking Catholic clergy in France who are not members of religious orders.

== History ==
A concordat between Pope Leo X and King François I of France (1516) gave the monarchs of France the right to nominate 255 commendatory abbots (abbés commendataires) for almost all French abbeys, who received income from a monastery without needing to render service, creating, in essence, a sinecure.

From the mid-16th century, the title of abbé has been used in France for all young clergy, with or without consecration. Their clothes consisted of black or dark violet robes with a small collar, and they were tonsured.

Since such abbés only rarely commanded an abbey, they often worked in upper-class families as tutors, spiritual directors, etc.; some (such as Gabriel Bonnot de Mably) became writers.

Clerical oblates and seminarians of the Institute of Christ the King Sovereign Priest also have the honorific title of abbé.

== See also ==
- Abbot#Modern abbots not as superior
- Abbé Pierre
- Abbé Faria
- Abbé Sieyès
- Abbé Franz Liszt
- Abbé Edgeworth de Firmont
