= Paul Joseph Nardini =

German priest (1821–1862)

Blessed Paul Joseph Nardini TOSF
- Born: 25 July 1821; Germersheim, Palatinate; Kingdom of Bavaria
- Died: 27 January 1862; Pirmasens, Palatinate; Kingdom of Bavaria
- Venerated in: Roman Catholic Church
- Beatified: 22 October 2006, Speyer, Germany by Pope Benedict XVI
- Major shrine: Convent of the Poor Franciscan Sisters of the Holy Family in Pirmasens
- Feast: 27 January

Paul Joseph Nardini (25 July 1821 – 27 January 1862) was a German diocesan priest and the founder of the religious congregation of the Poor Franciscan Sisters of the Holy Family, also commonly known as the Nardini sisters, or the Mallersdorfer sisters (from the town where they are headquartered). Nardini was beatified in 2006. His feast is on 27 January.

== Early life ==
Nardini was born at Germersheim in the Palatinate, then part of the Kingdom of Bavaria, to Margareta Lichtenberger, an unwed mother who gave him the name Paul Joseph Lichtenberger at his birth. The name of his father, an Austrian military engineer, has remained unknown. According to Norbert Weis, postulator in the beatification process of Paul Nardini, records suggest that Austrian aristocrat Joseph Zocchi of Morecci was likely his father.

Margareta was unemployed and thus not able to provide for herself and her son. After two years of living in deep poverty, she turned her son over to her paternal aunt, Maria Barbara Lichtenberger, who was married to Anton Nardini. The couple adopted young Paul and gave him their own surname. They loved the boy and raised him as if he had been their own son, providing him with the best education possible.

Nardini displayed extraordinary diligence in his studies and earned excellent grades. In so doing, he drew the attention of several teachers. After he completed grammar school, it became clear that Paul was interested in the priesthood. The Bishop of Speyer, Johannes von Geissel, had him admitted to the seminary at Speyer, where Nardini studied philosophy from 1841 through 1843. Upon completing his philosophy studies, he was sent to the Ludwig-Maximilians-Universität München by Geissel's successor, Nikolaus von Weis. There, Nardini obtained a degree in theology, and graduated summa cum laude. His professors encouraged the young scholar to stay at university, where he could be assured of a successful career, but he was determined to serve as a parish priest.

On 5 June 1846 Nardini received the minor orders. The next day, he was ordained a subdeacon. He received his Doctorate of Theology the following month. He then returned to Speyer where he was ordained a deacon on the 11 August. The following 22 August, he was ordained a priest in the Cathedral of Speyer. In his first years in the priesthood, Nardini served as a chaplain in Frankenthal, then as administrator of a parish in Trebur, followed by serving as a prefect at the diocesan boarding school in Speyer.

In February 1851, Nardini was appointed as the parish priest of the difficult and poor parish in Pirmasens. This was a post at which he would serve the rest of his life. He asked his birth mother to move there with him, which she did. Nardini was noted for his example of sacrifice, determination, self-denial and apostolic zeal, which was very important in evangelizing and drawing people to the Catholic Church in the largely Protestant area. His effectiveness as a priest, combined with his preaching and catechising skills and his love of the Eucharist, earned him a reputation for sanctity and led to his being called the "Father of the Poor" in the community.

Nardini became very concerned about the conditions in which the poor children and older adults in the Pirmasens area were forced to live. He came to see that the Catholic population were an oppressed minority in the region, with work hard to obtain from the Protestant majority. Children were reduced to begging on the street. He began to organize charities to help his flock in their poverty. Nardini determined that a community of professed Sisters would be needed to guarantee the continuity of the services he had organized in the parish. The town council, composed entirely of Protestants, strongly opposed the establishment of a convent in the town. Nardini stood fast in his determination, despite threats to his life.

In 1853, he requested that the Sisters of the Most Holy Redeemer, based in Niederbronn, come to Pirmasens to help in the care and education of the poor children of the area. He also asked them to help in the care of the sick. Soon after the arrival of three Sisters of the congregation, there was an outbreak of typhus in the city. The Sisters nursed the sick day and night, even bringing them into the small house Nardini had rented for them. One of them contracted the illness herself.

== Founder ==
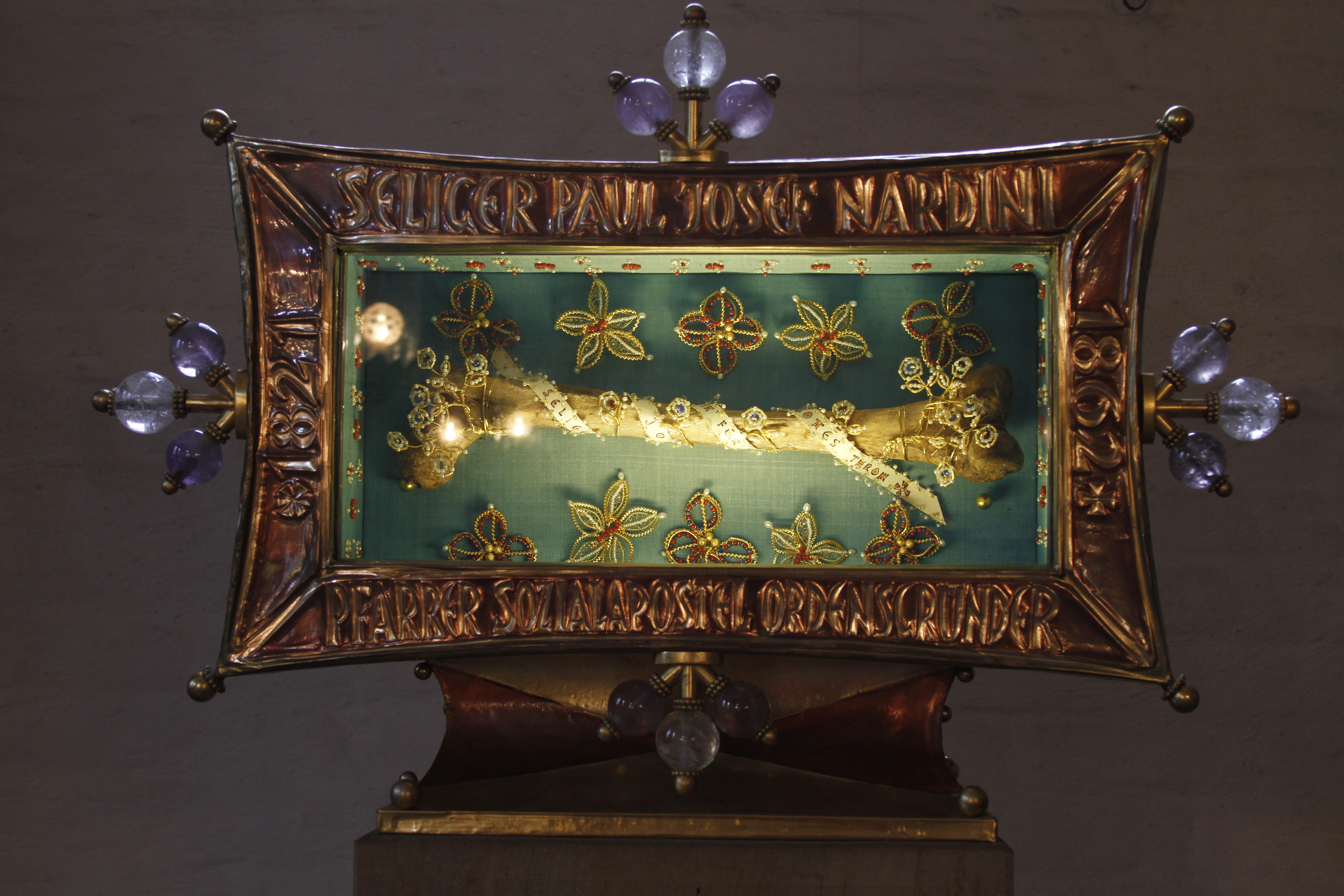
Relic of Nardini in the Speyer Cathedral

After two years, it became clear that the amount of work to be done was more than the Sisters could handle, and they were likely to be recalled. Additionally, the government passed a law banning members of religious congregations based outside Germany. As Niederbronn lies in Alsace, part of France, they were considered foreigners.

Nardini came to the conclusion that a local community of religious sisters would have to be established to keep the works of charity in his parish going. Upon the recall of one of the sisters when a fresh outbreak of typhus occurred, he brought into the little convent two young women of the parish, Barbara Schwarz and Julianne Michel, members of the Third Order of St. Francis, to which he belonged, too.

On the 2 March 1855, Nardini bestowed a habit upon the two women and gave them the religious names Agatha and Aloysia. Thus was founded the Congregation of Poor Franciscans of Pirmasens, which he put under the Rule of the Third Order of St. Francis Regular. The congregation would eventually change their name to the Poor Franciscan Sisters of the Holy Family. At that point the Redemptorist Sisters withdrew and returned to their motherhouse.

The early days of this new group of Sisters were not easy. While the people of Pirmasens did not object, reaction to the founding of a congregation of Catholic Religious Sisters in the region was furious. Newspaper articles around the State attacked Nardini for it. Unfortunately, in his determination he had failed to secure the permission of the local bishop for establishing a new religious congregation in the diocese. As a result, his letters to the bishop went unanswered for months. Nevertheless, he continued with the project. He personally took on the work of the care and formation of the Sisters of the new congregation. He also ensured that their food and lodging in the economically challenged area was regularly secured, often at the cost of depriving himself of his own meals. He was re-assured by the number of young women who were coming to join his small community. On 10 March 1857, the bishop finally broke his silence and gave the congregation the approval of the Catholic Church.

Nardini's care and oversight was not to last much longer, however, On a frigid night in January 1862, he was called to the bedside of a dying parishioner. As a result of the visit, he contracted pulmonary typhus, from which he died on the 27 January at the age of 40. By then, the congregation already numbered 220 Sisters, working in 35 different locations.

== Veneration ==
Nardini was considered a saint by the people of the town, and by all the Franciscan Sisters. He was buried in the chapel of the Sisters' motherhouse in Pirmasens. The cause for his beatification was begun in June 1997 by the Diocese of Speyer. On the 19 December 2005, Pope Benedict XVI officially recognized the heroic virtue of Nardini.

On 26 June 2006, the Pope recognized a miracle attributed to Nardini's intercession, the miraculous healing of one of the Poor Franciscan Sisters, Stephana Beyer, from late-stage cancer, which happened after the other Sisters prayed at Nardini's tomb for her. Pope Benedict XVI authorized the Congregation for the Causes of Saints to promulgate his cause.

Nardini was beatified by Cardinal Friedrich Wetter, Archbishop of Munich, in the Cathedral of Speyer, where Nardini had been ordained. There were some 2,000 people present for the ceremony, including some 600 Poor Franciscan Sisters of the Holy Family which Nardini founded, with thousands of others watching the ceremony on closed-circuit television in the square of the cathedral. It was the first beatification in Germany in 10 years, and the first one in which the Pope was not present. The then-Bishop of Speyer, Anton Schlembach, called Nardini a "highly gifted minister" who "opened people's eyes to the necessity and beauty of the priesthood".
