= National calendars of the Roman Rite =

Calendars of celebrations in the Catholic Church

National calendars of the Roman Rite of the Catholic Church are lists of saints' feast days and other liturgical celebrations, organized by calendar date, that apply to those within the nation or nations to which each calendar applies who worship according to the Roman Rite of the Latin Church. Such calendars are "particular calendars" that build off of the General Roman Calendar. National calendars primarily add feast days of saints whose lives profoundly affected the particular nation in question, or whose veneration is especially prevalent there.

== National calendars ==
=== Andorra ===
- 11 January: Blessed Ana María Janer, virgin - Optional Memorial
- 18 January: Saint Jaime Hilario Barbal, religious and martyr - Optional Memorial
- 19 January: Saint Agnes, virgin and martyr - Memorial
- 21 January: Saint Fructuosus, bishop, and Saint Augurius and Saint Eulogius, deacons, martyrs - Feast
- 23 January: Saint Ildephonsus of Toledo, bishop - Memorial
- 27 April: Our Lady of Montserrat - Solemnity
- 29 May: Saint Justus of Urgell, bishop - Memorial
- 15 June: Saint Maria Micaela Desmaisieres, virgin - Optional Memorial
- 26 June: Saint Josemaría Escrivá de Balaguer, priest - Optional Memorial
- 24 July: Blessed José Sala Picó, priest, and companions, martyrs - Optional Memorial
- 30 July: Blessed Protasio Cubells and companions, martyrs - Optional Memorial
- 12 August: Blessed Eusebio Codina Millá, Ramón Illa Salvia y Sebastián Riera Coromina, religious, and companions, martyrs - Optional Memorial
- 31 August: Saint Raymond Nonnatus, priest - Optional Memorial
- 8 September: Our Lady of Nuria - Solemnity
- 23 October: Dedication of the Cathedral of the Diocese of Urgell - Feast
- 3 November: Saint Ermengol of Urgell, bishop - Solemnity
- 6 November: Saint Pedro Poveda Castroverde, Saint Innocencio of Mary Immaculate, priests, and companions, martyrs - Memorial
- 16 December: Saint José Manyanet y Vives, priest - Memorial

=== Angola ===
- 3 January: The Most Holy Name of Jesus – Memorial
- 4 February: Saint John de Brito, martyr – Memorial
- 13 May: Our Lady of Fatima – Feast
- 3 June: Saints Charles Lwanga and companions, martyrs – Feast
- 5 August: Our Lady of Africa – Memorial
- 28 August: Saint Augustine of Hippo, bishop and doctor of the Church – Feast
- 9 September: Saint Peter Claver, priest – Memorial
- 3 October: Saint Thérèse of the Child Jesus, virgin and doctor of the Church – Feast
- Saturday before the last Sunday in October: Immaculate Heart of Mary – Solemnity
- 3 December: Saint Francis Xavier, priest – Feast

=== Argentina ===
According to the national calendar of Argentina, as requested by the Argentine Episcopal Conference (CEA) and approved by the Holy See:

- 22 January: Blessed Laura Vicuña – Optional Memorial
- 24 January: Our Lady, Queen of Peace – Optional Memorial
- 25 February: Blessed Maria Ludovica De Angelis, virgin – Optional Memorial
- 16 March: Saint Jose Gabriel del Rosario Brochero, priest – Optional Memorial
- 27 April: Saint Turibius of Mogrovejo, bishop – Feast
- 8 May: Our Lady of Luján, Patroness of Argentina – Solemnity
- 15 May: Saint Isidore the Laborer – Optional Memorial
- 16 May: Saint Luigi Orione, priest – Optional Memorial
- 20 May: Blessed María Crescentia Pérez, virgin – Optional Memorial
- 24 May: Mary, Help of Christians – Optional Memorial
- 6 July: Saint Nazaria Ignacia March Mesa, virgin – Optional Memorial
- 9 July: Our Lady of Itatí – Memorial
- 10 July: Saints Augustine Zhao Rong, priest, and companions, martyrs – Optional Memorial
- 16 July: Our Lady of Mount Carmel – Memorial
- 23 July: Saint Sharbel Makhlūf, priest – Optional Memorial
- 24 July: Saint Francis Solanus, priest – Memorial
- 16 August: Saint Rocco – Optional Memorial
- 25 August: Blessed María del Tránsito Cabanillas, virgin – Optional Memorial
- 26 August: Blessed Ceferino Namuncurá – Optional Memorial
- 30 August: Saint Rose of Lima, virgin – Feast
- 24 September: Our Lady of Mercy – Memorial
- 9 October: Saint Héctor Valdivielso Sáez, martyr – Optional Memorial
- 12 October: Our Lady of the Pillar – Optional Memorial
- 7 November: Mary, Mother and Mediatrix of Grace – Memorial
- 13 November: Saint Artémides Zatti, religious – Optional Memorial
- 17 November: Saints Roque González, Alfonso Rodríguez, and Juan del Castillo, priests and martyrs – Memorial
- 18 November: Saint Elizabeth of Hungary – Memorial
- 12 December: Our Lady of Guadalupe – Feast
- Saturday of the Second Week of Easter: Our Lady of the Valley – Memorial

=== Australia ===
See Liturgy Brisbane

- 27 January: Saints Timothy and Titus, bishops – Optional Memorial
- 17 March: Saint Patrick, bishop – Solemnity
- 26 April: Saint Mark, evangelist – Feast
- 27 April: Saint Louis Grignion de Montfort, priest – Optional Memorial
- 28 April: Saint Peter Chanel, martyr – Memorial
- 24 May: Our Lady, Help of Christians – Solemnity
- 6 June: Saint Marcellin Champagnat, priest – Optional Memorial
- 22 June: Saints John Fisher, bishop, and Thomas More, martyrs – Memorial
- 7 July: Saint Peter To Rot, martyr – Optional Memorial
- 3 August: Saint Dominic, priest – Memorial
- 8 August: Saint Mary of the Cross, virgin – Solemnity

=== Austria, Germany, Switzerland, German-speaking dioceses ===
The Episcopal Conferences of Austria, Germany, and Switzerland share one regional calendar, the Regionalkalender für das deutsche Sprachgebiet ("Regional calendar for the German language area"). It applies in Germany, Austria and Switzerland as well as in the dioceses of Luxembourg, Liège, Metz, Strasbourg, Vaduz and Bozen-Brixen.

From Das Stundenbuch Online

- 5 January: Saint John Neumann, bishop – Optional Memorial
- 7 January: Saint Valentine of Raetia, bishop – Optional Memorial (475) or Saint Raymond of Penyafort, founder of a religious order – Optional Memorial (1275)
- 8 January: Saint Severinus of Noricum, monk – Optional Memorial
- 13 January: Saint Hilary of Poitiers, father of the church – Optional Memorial
- 17 January: Saint Antony, desert father in Egypt
- 21 January: Saint Meinrad, martyr – Optional Memorial
- 23 January: Blessed Henry Suso, priest – Optional Memorial
- 4 February: Saint Rabanus Maurus, bishop – Optional Memorial
- 14 February: Saints Cyril, monk and Methodius, bishop – Feast
- 24 February: Saint Matthias, apostle – Feast
- 25 February: Saint Walburga, virgin – Optional Memorial
- 6 March: Saint Fridolin of Säckingen, monk – Optional Memorial
- 9 March: Saint Bruno of Querfurt, bishop – Optional Memorial
- 14 March: Saint Matilda – Optional Memorial
- 15 March: Saint Clement Mary Hofbauer, priest – Optional Memorial
- 17 March: Saint Gertrude of Nivelles, virgin – Optional Memorial
- 26 March: Saint Ludger, bishop – Optional Memorial
- 19 April: Saint Leo IX, pope or Blessed Marcel Callo, martyr – Optional Memorial
- 21 April: Saint Conrad of Parzham, religious – Optional Memorial
- 27 April: Saint Peter Canisius, priest and doctor of the Church – Optional Memorial
- 29 April: Saint Catherine of Siena, virgin and doctor of the Church – Feast
- 4 May: Saint Florian and his companions, martyrs – Optional Memorial
- 5 May: Saint Gotthard, bishop – Optional Memorial
- 16 May: Saint John Nepomucene, priest and martyr – Optional Memorial
- 21 May: Saint Hermann Joseph, priest – Optional Memorial
- 15 June: Saint Vitus, martyr – Optional Memorial
- 16 June: Saint Benno of Meissen, bishop – Optional Memorial
- 27 June: Saint Hemma of Gurk – Optional Memorial
- 30 June: Saint Otto of Bamberg, bishop – Optional Memorial
- 2 July: Visitation of the Blessed Virgin Mary – Feast
- 4 July: Saint Ulrich of Augsburg – Optional Memorial
- 7 July: Saint Willibald, bishop – Optional Memorial
- 8 July: Saint Kilian, bishop and companions, martyrs – Optional Memorial
- 10 July: Saints Canute, Eric and Olaf, martyrs – Optional Memorial
- 11 July: Saint Benedict, abbot – Feast
- 13 July: Saints Henry and Cunigunde – Optional Memorial
- 16 July: Our Lady of Einsiedeln (Memorial in Archdiocese of Vaduz)
- 20 July: Saint Margaret of Antioch, virgin and martyr – Optional Memorial
- 23 July: Saint Brigitta, religious – Feast
- 24 July: Saint Christopher, martyr – Optional Memorial
- 9 August: Saint Teresa Benedicta of the Cross, virgin and martyr – Feast
- 16 August: Saint Theodore of Octodurum, bishop (Optional Memorial in Archdiocese of Vaduz)
- 31 August: Saint Paulinus of Trier, bishop – Optional Memorial
- 11 September: Saint Felix and Saint Regula, martyrs (Optional Memorial in Archdiocese of Vaduz)
- 17 September: Saint Hildegard of Bingen, virgin and doctor of the Church – Optional Memorial
- 18 September: Saint Lambert of Maastricht, bishop and martyr – Optional Memorial
- 22 September: Saint Maurice and companions, martyrs – Optional Memorial
- 24 September: Saints Rupert and Virgilius of Salzburg, bishops – Optional Memorial
- 25 September: Saint Nicholas of Flüe, hermit – Optional Memorial (Solemnity in Archdiocese of Vaduz)
- 28 September: Saint Leoba, virgin – Optional Memorial
- 30 September: Saint Ursus and Saint Victor, martyrs (Optional Memorial in Archdiocese of Vaduz)
- 16 October: Saint Gall, monk, hermit – Optional Memorial
- 20 October: Saint Wendelin, hermit – Optional Memorial
- 21 October: Saint Ursula and companions, virgins and martyrs – Optional Memorial
- 31 October: Saint Wolfgang of Regensburg, bishop – Optional Memorial
- 3 November: Saint Hubert of Liege, bishop, or Saint Pirmin, bishop, or Blessed Rupert Mayer, priest – Optional Memorials
- 6 November: Saint Leonard of Noblac, hermit – Optional Memorial
- 7 November: Saint Willibrord, bishop – Optional Memorial
- 15 November: Saint Leopold III – Optional Memorial
- 17 November: Saint Gertrude the Great, virgin – Optional Memorial
- 19 November: Saint Elizabeth of Hungary, religious – Memorial
- 20 November: Saint Corbinian, bishop – Optional Memorial
- 26 November: Saints Conrad and Gebhard of Constance, bishops – Optional Memorial
- 2 December: Saint Lucius of Chur, bishop and martyr – Optional Memorial (Solemnity in Archdiocese of Vaduz)
- 4 December: Saint Barbara, virgin and martyr or Blessed Adolph Kolping, priest – Optional Memorials
- 5 December: Saint Anno II, bishop – Optional Memorial
- 13 December: Saint Odile of Alsace, abbess – Optional Memorial

=== Belarus ===
- 29 January: Blessed Bolesława Lament, virgin - Optional Memorial
- 16 May: Saint Andrew Bobola, priest, martyr - Memorial
- 5 July: Our Lady of Trakeli - Optional Memorial
- 6 July: Our Lady of Budslau - Feast
- 26 August: Our Lady of Częstochowa - Memorial
- 4 September: Blessed Maria Stella and companions, virgins and martyrs – Optional Memorial
- 12 November: Saint Josaphat, Bishop and Martyr – Feast
- 16 November: Our Lady of the Gate of Dawn - Memorial
- 20 November: Saint Rafał Kalinowski, priest – Optional Memorial

=== Belgium ===
From Calendrier Liturgique à l’usage des diocèses belges francophone and Liturgische Kalender voor de Eucharistieviering.

- 30 January: Saint Brother Mutien-Marie, religious – Optional Memorial
- 6 February: Saint Amand, missionary – Memorial
- 7 February: Saints Paul Miki and companions, martyrs – Memorial
- 18 February: Saint Bernadette Soubirous, religious – Optional Memorial
- 10 May: Saint Father Damien, missionary – Memorial
- 10 June: Blessed Edward Poppe, priest – Optional Memorial
- 7 August: Saint Juliana of Liège, virgin – Optional Memorial
- 31 August: Our Lady, Mediatrix – Optional Memorial
- 17 September: Saint Lambert, bishop and martyr – Optional Memorial
- 3 November: Saint Hubert, bishop – Optional Memorial
- 26 November: Saint John Berchmans, religious – Optional memorial

=== Bolivia ===
- 6 February: Saints Felipe de Jesús, Paul Miki and companions, martyrs – Memorial
- 23 March: Saint Turibius of Mogrovejo, bishop – Memorial
- 25 May: Saint Mariana de Jesús de Paredes, virgin – Optional Memorial
- 9 July: Blessed Nazaria Ignacia March, religious – Memorial
- 12 July: Saint Camillus de Lellis, priest – Optional Memorial
- 14 July: Saint Francis Solanus, priest – Feast
- 16 July: Our Lady of Mount Carmel – Solemnity
- 23 August: Saint Rose of Lima, virgin – Feast
- 9 September: Saint Peter Claver, priest – Optional Memorial
- 18 September: Saint John Macias, religious – Memorial
- 9 October: Saint Louis Bertrand, priest – Optional Memorial
- 21 October: Saint Miguel Febres Cordero, religious – Optional Memorial
- 24 October: Saint Anthony Mary Claret, bishop – Memorial
- 3 November: Saint Martin de Porres, religious – Memorial
- 19 November: Saints Roque González, Alfonso Rodríguez Olmedo, and Juan del Castillo, priests and martyrs – Memorial
- 12 December: Our Lady of Guadalupe – Feast
- Thursday after Pentecost: Our Lord Jesus Christ, the Eternal High Priest – Feast

=== Bosnia and Herzegovina ===
- 9 February: Saint Scholastica, virgin – Memorial
- 10 February: Blessed Aloysius Stepinac, bishop and martyr – Memorial
- 14 February: Saints Cyril, monk and Methodius, bishop – Feast
- 27 April: Blessed Osanna of Cattaro, virgin – Optional Memorial
- 29 April: Saint Catherine of Siena, virgin and doctor of the Church – Feast
- 10 May: Blessed Ivan Merz – Memorial
- 12 May: Saint Leopold Mandić, priest – Memorial
- 9 July: Blessed Mary of Jesus Crucified Petković, virgin – Optional Memorial
- 11 July: Saint Benedict, abbot – Feast
- 13 July: Our Lady of Bistrica – Optional Memorial
- 20 July: Saint Elijah, prophet – Feast
- 23 July: Saint Birgitta, religious – Feast
- 27 July: Saint Clement of Ohrid and Gorazd, bishops and companions – Optional Memorial
- 3 August: Blessed Augustin Kažotić, martyr, bishop – Optional Memorial
- 16 August: Saint Roch – Optional Memorial
- 7 September: Saint Marko Krizin, priest and martyr – Feast
- 27 November: Blessed Grazia of Cattaro – Optional Memorial
- 14 November: Saint Nikola Tavelić, priest and martyr – Memorial

=== Botswana, Ghana, Kenya, South Africa and Swaziland ===
- 9 January: Saint Adrian of Canterbury, abbot – Optional Memorial
- 20 January: Blessed Cyprian Michael Tansi, priest; or Saint Fabian, pope and martyr; or Saint Sebastian, martyr – Optional Memorial
- 1 February: Blessed Benedict Daswa– Optional Memorial
- 26 February: Saint Alexander of Alexandria, bishop – Optional Memorial
- 4 April: Saint Benedict, religious or Saint Isidore, bishop and doctor of the Church – Optional Memorial
- 12 April: Saint Zeno of Verona, bishop – Optional Memorial
- 20 April: Saint Marcellinus, bishop – Optional Memorial
- 28 April: Saint Pius V, pope; or Saint Peter Chanel, priest and martyr; or Saint Louis Grignon de Montfort, priest – Optional Memorial
- 30 April: Our Lady, Mother of Africa – Feast
- 24 May: Blessed Virgin Mary, Help of Christians – Memorial
- 29 May: Blessed Joseph Gerard, priest – Optional Memorial
- 12 June: Saint Onuphrius, hermit – Optional Memorial
- 28 July: Saint Victor I, pope and martyr – Optional Memorial
- 30 July: Saint Justin de Jacobis, bishop; or Saint Peter Chrysologus, bishop and doctor of the Church – Optional Memorial
- 12 August: Blessed Isidore Bakanja, martyr; or Saint Jane Frances de Chantal, religious – Optional Memorial
- 18 August: Blessed Victoria Rasoamanarivo – Optional Memorial
- 22 September: Saint Maurice and companions, martyrs – Optional Memorial
- 10 October: Saint Daniel Comboni, bishop – Memorial
- 20 October: Blessed Daudi Okelo and Jildo Irwa, martyrs – Optional Memorial
- 6 November: All Saints of Africa – Memorial
- 1 December: Blessed Clementine Anuarite, virgin and martyr – Optional Memorial

=== Brazil ===
As set by the Episcopal Conference of Brazil:

- 8 June: Saint Ephrem, deacon and doctor of the Church – Optional Memorial
- 9 June: Saint Joseph of Anchieta, priest and co-patron of Brazil – Memorial
- 8 July: Saint Augustine Zhao Rong, Priest, and Companions, Martyrs – optional memorial
- 9 July: Saint Pauline of the Agonizing Heart of Jesus, virgin – Memorial
- 16 July: Blessed Virgin Mary of Mount Carmel – Feast
- 17 July: Blessed Inácio de Azevedo, priest and martyr, and companions, martyrs – Memorial
- 12 August: Saints Pontian, Pope, and Hippolytus, Priest, Martyrs – optional memorial
- 13 August: Saint Dulce of the Poor, virgin – Memorial
- 23 August: Saint Rose of Lima, virgin, Patroness of Latin America – Feast
- 3 October: Saints André de Soveral and Ambrósio Francisco Ferro, priests and martyrs, Mateus Moreira, laymen and martyr, and companions, martyrs – Memorial
- 5 October: Saint Benedict the Moor, religious – Optional Memorial
- 6 October: Saint Faustina Kowalska, virgin – Optional Memorial
- 12 October: Blessed Virgin Mary of the Conception Aparecida, Patroness of Brazil – Solemnity
- 19 October: Saint Peter of Alcántara, religious and co-patron of Brazil – Optional Memorial
- 25 October: Saint Anthony of Saint Anne Galvão (Frei Galvão), priest – Memorial
- 19 November: Saints Roque González, Alfonso Rodríguez, and Juan del Castillo, priests and martyrs – Memorial
- 12 December: Blessed Virgin Mary of Guadalupe, Patroness of the Americas – Feast

=== Brunei, Malaysia, Singapore and Thailand ===
- 14 February: Dedication of the Cathedral at Singapore - Feast (in Singapore)
- 19 June: Saint Philip Minh and companions, martyrs - Memorial (in Brunei, Malaysia and Singapore)
- 20 September: Saints Laurent Imbert, bishop, Jacques Chastan, priest, and companions, martyrs - Memorial (in Brunei and Singapore)
- 3 December: Saint Francis Xavier, priest - Feast
- 16 December: Blessed Martyrs of Songkhon - Optional Memorial (at Thailand)

=== Canada ===
According to the national calendar of Canada, as requested by the Canadian Conference of Catholic Bishops (CCCB) and approved by the Holy See:

- 7 January: Saint André Bessette, religious – Memorial
- 8 January: Saint Raymond of Penyafort, priest – Optional Memorial
- 12 January: Saint Marguerite Bourgeoys, virgin – Memorial
- 19 March: Saint Joseph, spouse of the Blessed Virgin Mary, principal patron of Canada – Solemnity
- 17 April: Saint Kateri Tekakwitha, virgin – Memorial
- 18 April: Blessed Marie-Anne Blondin, virgin – Optional Memorial
- 26 April: Our Lady of Good Counsel – Optional Memorial
- 30 April: Saint Marie of the Incarnation, religious – Memorial
- 1 May: Saint Pius V, pope – Optional Memorial
- 4 May: Blessed Marie-Léonie Paradis, virgin – Optional Memorial
- 6 May: Saint François de Laval, bishop – Memorial
- 8 May: Blessed Catherine of Saint Augustine, virgin – Optional Memorial
- 21 May: Saint Eugène de Mazenod, bishop – Optional Memorial
- 24 May: Blessed Louis-Zéphirin Moreau, bishop – Optional Memorial
- 27 June: Blesseds Nykyta Budka and Vasyl Velychkowsky, bishops and martyrs – Optional Memorial
- 26 July: Saint Anne, patron of Quebec, and Saint Joachim, parents of the Blessed Virgin Mary – Feast
- 5 August: Blessed Frédéric Janssoone, priest – Optional Memorial
- 2 September: Blessed André Grasset, priest and martyr – Optional Memorial
- 4 September: Blessed Dina Bélanger, virgin – Optional Memorial
- 24 September: Blessed Émilie Tavernier-Gamelin, religious – Optional Memorial
- 25 September: Saints Cosmas and Damian, martyrs – Optional Memorial
- 26 September: Saints John de Brébeuf, Isaac Jogues, priests, and companions, martyrs, secondary patrons of Canada – Feast
- 6 October: Blessed Marie-Rose Durocher, virgin – Optional Memorial
- 16 October: Saint Marguerite d'Youville, religious – Memorial
- 20 October: Saint Hedwig, religious or Saint Margaret Mary Alacoque, virgin – Optional Memorial
- 22 October: Dedication of Consecrated Churches whose date of Consecration is unknown – Solemnity
- 12 December: Our Lady of Guadalupe – Feast

=== Cape Verde ===
- 13 May: Our Lady of Fatima – Memorial
- 3 June: Saints Charles Lwanga and companions, martyrs – Feast
- 5 August: Our Lady of Africa – Memorial
- 28 August: Saint Augustine of Hippo, bishop and doctor of the Church – Feast
- 9 September: Saint Peter Claver, priest – Memorial
- Saturday before the last Sunday in October: Immaculate Heart of Mary – Solemnity
- 3 October: Saint Thérèse of the Child Jesus, virgin and doctor of the Church – Feast
- 3 December: Saint Francis Xavier, priest – Feast

=== Chile ===
According to the national calendar of Chile, as requested by the Episcopal Conference of Chile (CECh) and approved by the Holy See:

- 22 January: Blessed Laura Vicuña, virgin – Optional Memorial
- 7 February: Blessed Pius IX, pope – Optional Memorial
- 11 February: Our Lady of Lourdes – Memorial
- 3 May: Exaltation of the Holy Cross – Feast
- 4 May: Saints Philip and James, apostles – Feast
- 13 July: Saint Teresa of Los Andes, virgin – Feast
- 14 July: Saint Camillus de Lellis, priest, or Saint Henry – Optional Memorial
- 16 July: Our Lady of Mount Carmel, Mother and Queen of Chile – Solemnity
- 18 August: Saint Alberto Hurtado, priest – Memorial
- 26 August: Blessed Ceferino Namuncurá – Optional Memorial
- 30 August: Saint Rose of Lima, virgin – Feast
- 24 September: Our Lady of Mercy – Optional Memorial
- 12 December: Our Lady of Guadalupe – Feast
- Thursday after Pentecost: Jesus Christ, the Eternal High Priest – Feast

=== China (Taiwan, Hong Kong, Macau and Mainland China) ===
From the website of the Chinese Regional Bishops' Conference

- 14 January: Blessed Odoric of Pordenone, priest – Optional Memorial
- 15 January: Saint Francis Fernandez de Capillas, priest and martyr – Optional Memorial
- 23 January: Saint Lawrence Bai Xiaoman, martyr – Optional Memorial
- 26 January: Blessed Gabriele Allegra, priest - Memorial (Hong Kong)
- 27 January: Saint Augustine Zhao Rong, priest and martyr – Optional Memorial
- 29 January: Saint Laurence Wang Bing and companions, martyrs or Saint Joseph Freinademetz, priest – Optional Memorials
- 13 February: Saint John of Triora, priest and martyr – Optional Memorial
- 18 February: Saint Martin Wu Xuesheng and companions, martyrs – Optional Memorial
- 19 February: Saint Lucy Yi Zhenmei, virgin and martyr – Optional Memorial
- 21 February: Saint Paul Liu Hanzou, priest and martyr – Optional Memorial
- 25 February: Saints Louis Versiglia, bishop and Callistus Caravario, priest, martyrs – Optional Memorial
- 1 March: Saint Agnes Cao Guiying, martyr – Optional Memorial
- 12 March: Saint Joseph Zhang Dapeng, martyr – Optional Memorial
- 8 April: Blessed Maria Assunta Pallotta, virgin – Optional Memorial
- 29 April: Saint Catherine of Siena, virgin and doctor of the Church - Memorial (Feast in Macau)
- 4 May: Blessed John Martin Moye, priest – Optional Memorial
- 17 May: Saint Peter Liu, martyr – Optional Memorial
- 27 May: Saint Peter Sanz, bishop and martyr – Optional Memorial
- 29 May: Saint Joachim Ho, martyr – Optional Memorial
- 20 June: Saints Gregory Grassi, Francis Fogolla, Anthony Fantosati and companions, martyrs – Optional Memorial
- 23 June: Saint Joseph Yuan, priest and martyr – Optional Memorial
- 8 July: Seven Martyred Nuns from the Franciscan Missionaries of Mary – Optional Memorial
- 9 July: Saint Augustine Zhao Rong, priest and companions, martyrs – Solemnity
- 20 July: Saint Leo Mangin and companions, martyrs – Optional Memorial
- 21 July: Saint Alberic Crescitelli, priest and martyr – Optional Memorial
- 28 July: Saint Paul Chen Changpin and companions, martyrs – Optional Memorial
- 12 August: Blessed Maurice Tornay, priest and martyr – Optional Memorial
- 11 September: Saint John Gabriel Perboyre, priest and martyr – Optional Memorial
- 27 October: Saint Francis Diaz, priest and companions, martyrs – Memorial
- 7 November: Saint Peter Wu, martyr – Optional Memorial
- 27 November: Saint Gabriel-Taurin Dufresse, bishop and martyr – Optional Memorial
- 3 December: Saint Francis Xavier, priest - Memorial (Feast in Macau)
- Saturday after Ash Wednesday: The Five Wounds of our Lord Jesus Christ (Feast in Macau)
- Second Saturday of May: Our Lady of China – Memorial (observed as a Feast in Macau every 1st day of the lunar new year)
- Thursday after Pentecost: Jesus Christ, the Eternal High Priest – Feast

=== Colombia ===
- 23 March: Saint Turibius of Mogrovejo, bishop – Memorial
- 3 May: Exaltation of the Holy Cross – Feast
- 4 May: Saints Philip and James, apostles – Feast
- 19 May: Saint Maria Bernarda Bütler, virgin – Optional Memorial
- 26 May: Saint Mariana de Jesús de Paredes y Flores, virgin – Memorial
- 28 May: Saint Philip Neri, priest – Memorial
- 26 June: Saint Josemaría Escrivá de Balaguer, priest – Optional Memorial
- 9 July: Our Lady of the Rosary of Chiquinquirá, Patroness of Colombia – Feast
- 10 July: Saints Augustine Zhao Rong and companions, martyrs – Optional Memorial
- 16 July: Our Lady of Mount Carmel – Memorial
- 17 August: Saint Beatriz of Silva, virgin – Optional Memorial
- 19 August: Saint Ezekiel Moreno, bishop – Optional Memorial
- 30 August: Saint Rose of Lima, virgin – Feast
- 26 August: Saint Teresa of Jesus Jornet e Ibars, virgin – Memorial
- 9 September: Saint Peter Claver, priest – Memorial
- 26 September: Saint Paul VI, pope – Optional Memorial
- 9 October: Saint Louis Bertrand, priest – Memorial
- 21 October: Saint Laura Montoya of Saint Catherine of Siena, virgin – Memorial
- 3 November: Saint Martin de Porres, religious – Memorial
- 12 December: Our Lady of Guadalupe – Feast
- Thursday after Corpus Christi: Our Lord Jesus Christ, the Eternal High Priest – Feast

=== Costa Rica ===
- 15 January: Crucified Lord of Esquipulas – Memorial
- 15 May: Saint Isidore the Laborer – Feast
- 27 June: Our Lady of Perpetual Help – Optional Memorial
- 16 July: Our Lady of Mount Carmel – Memorial
- 2 August: Our Lady of Angels – Solemnity
- 30 August: Saint Rose of Lima, virgin – Feast
- 3 November: Saint Martin de Porres, religious – Memorial
- 12 December: Our Lady of Guadalupe – Feast
- Thursday after Pentecost: Jesus Christ, the Eternal High Priest – Feast

=== Croatia ===
- 10 February: Blessed Aloysius Stepinac, bishop and martyr – Memorial
- 14 February: Saints Cyril, monk and Methodius, bishop – Feast
- 29 April: Saint Catherine of Siena, virgin and doctor of the Church – Feast
- 10 May: Blessed Ivan Merz – Memorial
- 12 May: Saint Leopold Mandić, priest – Memorial
- 4 June: Saint Quirinus of Sescia – Optional Memorial
- 9 July: Blessed Mary of Jesus Crucified Petković, virgin – Optional Memorial
- 11 July: Saint Benedict, abbot – Feast
- 13 July: Our Lady of Bistrica – Feast
- 23 July: Saint Birgitta, religious – Feast
- 3 August: Blessed Augustin Kažotić, martyr – Optional Memorial
- 9 August: Saint Teresa Benedicta of the Cross (Edith Stein), virgin and martyr – Feast
- 7 September: Saint Marko Krizin, priest and martyr – Memorial
- 14 November: Saint Nikola Tavelić, priest and martyr – Feast

=== Czech Republic ===
- 18 January: Our Lady, Mother of Christian Unity – Memorial
- 23 April: Saint Adalbert, bishop and martyr – Feast
- 29 April: Saint Catherine of Siena, virgin and doctor of the church – Feast
- 30 April: Saint Sigismund, martyr – Optional Memorial
- 8 May: Our Lady, Mediatrix of All Grace – Optional Memorial
- 16 May: Saint John Nepomucene, priest and martyr – Feast
- 20 May: Saint Clement Mary Hofbauer, priest – Memorial
- 30 May: Saint Zdislava – Memorial
- 15 June: Saint Vitus, martyr – Optional Memorial
- 19 June: Saint John Neumann, bishop – Optional Memorial
- 4 July: Saint Procopius, abbot – Optional Memorial
- 5 July: Saints Cyril, monk and Methodius, bishop – Solemnity
- 11 July: Saint Benedict, abbot – Feast
- 14 July: Blessed Hroznata, martyr – Optional memorial
- 17 July: Blessed Ceslaus and Saint Hyacinth, priests – Optional Memorial
- 23 July: Saint Bridget, religious – Feast
- 9 August: Saint Teresa Benedicta of the Cross (Edith Stein), virgin and martyr – Feast
- 25 August: Saints Benedykt, Jan, Mateusz, Isaak and Krystyn, martyrs – Optional Memorial
- 5 September: Saint Teresa of Calcutta, virgin – Optional Memorial
- 7 September: Saint Melchior Grodziecki, priest and martyr – Optional Memorial
- 10 September: Blessed Charles Spinola, priest and martyr – Optional Memorial
- 16 September: Saint Ludmila, martyr – Memorial
- 28 September: Saint Wenceslaus, martyr – Solemnity
- 12 October: Saint Radim, bishop – Optional Memorial
- 21 October: Blessed Karl of Austria – Optional Memorial
- 31 October: Saint Wolfgang, bishop – Optional Memorial
- 13 November: Saint Agnes of Bohemia, virgin – Memorial
- 1 December: Saint Edmund Campion, priest and martyr – Optional Memorial
- Thursday after Pentecost: Our Lord Jesus Christ, the Eternal High Priest – Feast

=== Democratic Republic of Congo ===
- 3 June: Saints Charles Lwanga and companions, martyrs – Feast
- 12 August: Blessed Isidore Bakanja, martyr – Feast
- 9 September: Saint Peter Claver, priest – Memorial
- 3 October: Saint Thérèse of the Child Jesus, virgin and doctor of the church – Feast
- 1 December: Blessed Clementine Anuarite, virgin and martyr – Feast
- 3 December: Saint Francis Xavier, priest – Feast

=== Denmark ===
- 7 January: Saint Canute, martyr– Optional Memorial
- 19 January: Saint Henry, bishop and martyr – Memorial
- 31 January: Saint Ansgar, bishop – Solemnity
- 1 February: Saint John Bosco, priest – Memorial
- 14 February: Saints Cyril, monk and Methodius, bishop – Feast
- 29 April: Saint Catherine of Siena, virgin and doctor of the Church – Feast
- 18 May: Saint Eric IX, martyr – Memorial
- 16 June: Saint William of Æbelholt, abbot – Memorial
- 10 July: Saint Canute, martyr – Memorial
- 11 July: Saint Benedict, abbot – Feast
- 12 July: Saint Kjeld of Viborg, priest – Optional Memorial
- 23 July: Saint Brigitta, religious – Feast
- 29 July: Saint Olaf, martyr – Memorial
- 9 August: Saint Teresa Benedicta of the Cross, virgin and martyr – Feast
- 30 October: Saint Theodgar of Vestervig, priest – Optional Memorial
- 7 November: Saint Willibrord, bishop – Memorial
- Thursday after Pentecost: Our Lord Jesus Christ, the Eternal High Priest – Feast

=== Ecuador ===
- 9 February: Saint Miguel Febres Cordero, religious – Feast
- 27 February: Blessed Caridad Brader - Optional Memorial
- 20 April: Our Lady of Sorrows of El Colegio – Feast
- 19 May: Saint María Bernarda Bütler, virgin - Memorial
- 23 August: Saint Rose of Lima, virgin – Feast
- 24 September: Our Lady of Mercy – Optional Memorial
- 10 December: Saint Narcisa de Jesús, virgin – Optional Memorial
- 12 December: Our Lady of Guadalupe – Feast
- Thursday after Corpus Christi: Our Lord Jesus Christ, the Eternal High Priest – Feast

=== England ===
According to the national calendar of England, as requested by the Catholic Bishops' Conference of England and Wales and approved by the Holy See:

- 12 January: Saint Aelred of Rievaulx – Optional Memorial
- 19 January: Saint Wulstan, bishop – Optional Memorial
- 14 February: Saints Cyril, monk, and Methodius, bishop – Feast
- 1 March: Saint David, bishop – Feast
- 17 March: Saint Patrick, bishop – Feast
- 23 April: Saint George, martyr – Solemnity
- 24 April: Saint Adalbert, bishop and martyr or Saint Fidelis of Sigmaringen, priest and martyr – Optional Memorial
- 29 April: Saint Catherine of Siena, virgin and doctor of the Church – Feast
- 4 May: The English Martyrs – Feast
- 19 May: Saint Dunstan, bishop – Optional Memorial
- 25 May: Saint Bede the Venerable, priest and doctor – Memorial
- 27 May: Saint Augustine of Canterbury, bishop – Feast
- Thursday after Pentecost: Our Lord Jesus Christ, the Eternal High Priest – Feast
- 9 June: Saint Columba, abbot – Optional Memorial
- 16 June: Saint Richard of Chichester, bishop – Optional Memorial
- 20 June: Saint Alban, martyr – Optional Memorial
- 22 June: Saints John Fisher, bishop and Thomas More, martyrs – Feast
- 23 June: Saint Etheldreda (Audrey), virgin – Optional Memorial
- 1 July: Saint Oliver Plunket, bishop and martyr – Optional Memorial
- 11 July: Saint Benedict, abbot – Feast
- 23 July: Saint Bridget, religious – Feast
- 9 August: Saint Teresa Benedicta of the Cross (Edith Stein), virgin and martyr – Feast
- 26 August: Blessed Dominic of the Mother of God Barberi, priest – Optional Memorial
- 30 August: Saints Margaret Clitherow, Anne Line and Margaret Ward, martyrs – Optional Memorial
- 31 August: Saint Aidan, bishop and the Saints of Lindisfarne – Optional Memorial
- 3 September: Saint Gregory the Great, pope and doctor – Feast
- 4 September: Saint Cuthbert, bishop – Optional Memorial
- 19 September: Saint Theodore of Canterbury, bishop – Optional Memorial
- 24 September: Our Lady of Walsingham – Feast (Memorial in Wales)
- 9 October: Saint John Henry Newman, priest and doctor of the Church – Feast
- 10 October: Saint Paulinus of York, bishop – Optional Memorial
- 12 October: Saint Wilfrid, bishop – Optional Memorial
- 13 October: Saint Edward the Confessor – Optional Memorial
- 26 October: Saints Chad and Cedd, bishop – Optional Memorial
- 3 November: Saint Winefride, virgin – Optional Memorial
- 7 November: Saint Willibrord, bishop – Optional Memorial
- 16 November: Saint Edmund of Abingdon, bishop or Saint Margaret of Scotland or Saint Gertrude the Great, virgin – Optional Memorial
- 17 November: Saint Hilda, abbess or Saint Hugh of Lincoln, bishop or Saint Elizabeth of Hungary – Optional Memorial
- 29 December: Saint Thomas Becket, bishop and martyr – Feast

=== Finland ===
From the website of the Catholic Church in Finland

- 19 January: Saint Henry, bishop and martyr – Solemnity
- 3 February: Saint Ansgar, bishop – Memorial
- 14 February: Saints Cyril, monk and Methodius, bishop – Feast
- 29 April: Saint Catherine of Siena, virgin and doctor of the Church – Feast
- 18 May: Saint Eric, martyr – Memorial
- 22 May: Blessed Hemming, bishop – Memorial
- 29 May: Saint Ursula Ledóchowska, virgin – Optional Memorial
- 4 June: Saint Elizabeth Hesselblad, virgin – Optional Memorial
- 26 June: Saint Josemaría Escrivá de Balaguer, priest – Optional Memorial
- 10 July: Saint Canute, martyr – Memorial
- 11 July: Saint Benedict, abbot – Feast
- 20 July: Saint Thorlac, bishop – Memorial
- 29 July: Saint Olaf, martyr – Memorial
- 9 August: Saint Teresa Benedicta of the Cross, virgin and martyr – Feast
- 24 September All Nordic Saints, Memorial
- 7 October: Saint Brigitta, religious – Feast
- 25 November: Blessed Nicolas Steno, bishop – Optional Memorial

=== France ===
According to the Calendrier propre à la France

- 3 January: Saint Genevieve, virgin – Optional Memorial
- 15 January: Saint Remigius, bishop – Optional Memorial
- 14 February: Saints Cyril, monk and Methodius, bishop – Feast
- 18 February: Saint Bernadette Soubirous, virgin – Optional Memorial
- 29 April: Saint Catherine of Siena, virgin and doctor of the Church – Feast
- 19 May: Saint Ivo, priest – Optional Memorial
- 30 May: Saint Joan of Arc, virgin, secondary patroness of France – Memorial
- 2 June: Saint Pothinus, bishop, Saint Blandina, virgin, and companions, martyrs – Optional Memorial
- 4 June: Saint Clotilde – Optional Memorial
- 11 July: Saint Benedict, abbot – Feast
- 23 July: Saint Brigitta, religious – Feast
- 9 August: Saint Teresa Benedicta of the Cross, virgin and martyr – Feast
- 15 August: Assumption of the Blessed Virgin Mary, principal patroness of France – Solemnity
- 26 August: Saint Caesarius of Arles, bishop – Optional Memorial
- 19 September: Our Lady of La Salette – Optional Memorial
- 1 October: Saint Thérèse of the Child Jesus, virgin, secondary patroness of France – Memorial

=== Guam and Northern Marianas Islands ===
- 13 January: Blessed Diego Luis de San Vitores, priest and martyr (Feast in Guam)
- 29 April: Dedication of the Cathedral at Agana (Feast at Guam)
- 1 May: Saint Joseph the Worker (Memorial at Northern Marianas)
- 16 July: Our Lady of Mount Carmel (Feast at Northern Marianas)
- Fourth Thursday of November: Day of Prayer for the Harvest and Fruits of the Earth (at Guam)
- 14 December: Dedication of the Cathedral at Chalan Kanoa (Feast at Northern Marianas)

=== Guatemala ===
- 15 January: Crucified Lord of Esquipulas – Feast
- 24 April: Saint Peter of Saint Joseph de Betancur, priest – Solemnity
- 3 May: Exaltation of the Holy Cross – Feast
- 4 May: Saint Philip and Saint James, apostles – Feast
- 7 October: Our Lady of the Rosary – Feast
- 12 December: Our Lady of Guadalupe – Feast
- Thursday after Pentecost: Our Lord Jesus Christ, the Eternal High Priest – Feast

=== Guinea-Bissau ===
- 2 February: Our Lady of Candles – Solemnity
- 13 May: Our Lady of Fatima – Memorial
- 3 June: Saints Charles Lwanga and companions, martyrs – Feast
- 4 July: Saint Elizabeth of Portugal – Memorial
- 5 August: Our Lady of Africa – Memorial
- 28 August: Saint Augustine of Hippo, bishop and doctor of the Church – Feast
- 9 September: Saint Peter Claver, priest – Memorial
- Saturday before the last Sunday in October: Immaculate Heart of Mary – Solemnity
- 3 October: Saint Thérèse of the Child Jesus, virgin and doctor – Feast
- 3 December: Saint Francis Xavier, priest – Feast

=== Greece ===
- 14 February: Saints Cyril, Monk and Methodius – Feast
- 18 March: Saint Cyril of Jerusalem – Memorial
- 22 April: Saint Adalbert – Optional Memorial
- 23 April: Saint George – Memorial
- 29 April: Saint Catherine of Siena – Feast
- 5 May: Saint Irene – Memorial
- 13 May: Blessed Virgin Mary, Mother of the Church – Memorial
- 15 May: Our Lady of Fatima – Optional Memorial
- 27 June: Saint Cyril of Alexandria – Memorial
- 11 July: Saint Benedict – Feast
- 17 July: Saint Marina – Memorial
- 23 July: Saint Birgitta – Feast
- 27 July: Saint Pantaleon – Memorial
- 3 August: Saint Lydia of Philippi – Memorial
- 9 August: Saint Teresa Benedicta of the Cross (Edith Stein) – Feast
- 26 September: Saints Cosmas and Damian – Memorial
- 3 October: Saint Dionysius the Areopagite – Memorial
- 26 October: Saint Demetrius – Memorial
- 21 November: Presentation of the Blessed Virgin Mary – Feast
- 4 December: Saint John Damascene or Saint Barbara – Optional Memorial
- 6 December: Saint Nicholas – Memorial
- 12 December: Saint Spyridon – Memorial

=== Haiti ===
- 21 January: Our Lady of Altagracia – Memorial
- 23 March: Saint Turibius of Mogrovejo, bishop – Feast
- 27 June: Our Lady of Perpetual Help – Solemnity
- 4 July: All Holy Popes – Memorial
- 23 August: Saint Rose of Lima, virgin – Solemnity
- 9 September: Saint Peter Claver, priest – Memorial
- 3 November: Saint Martin de Porres, religious – Memorial
- 12 December: Our Lady of Guadalupe – Feast

=== Hungary ===
- 15 January: Saint Paul the First Hermit – Optional Memorial
- 18 January: Saint Margaret of Hungary – Feast
- 20 January: Blessed Eusebius of Esztergom, bishop – Optional Memorial
- 22 January: Blessed László Batthyány-Strattmann – Optional Memorial
- 14 February: Saints Cyril, monk and Methodius, bishop – Feast
- 24 February: Saint Matthias, apostle – Feast
- 4 March: Blessed Meszlényi Zoltán, bishop and martyr – Optional Memorial
- 18 April: Saint Bernadette Soubirous, virgin – Optional Memorial
- 23 April: Saint Adalbert, bishop and martyr – Memorial
- 29 April: Saint Catherine of Siena, virgin and doctor of the Church – Feast
- 4 May: Saint Florian, martyr – Optional Memorial
- 7 May: Blessed Gisela – Optional Memorial
- 11 May: Blessed Sára Salkaházi, virgin and martyr – Optional Memorial
- 16 May: Saint John Nepomucene, priest and martyr – Optional Memorial
- 17 May: Blessed John Scheffler, bishop and martyr – Memorial
- 23 May: Blessed Vilmos Apor, bishop and martyr – Optional Memorial
- 24 May: Our Lady, Help of Christians – Memorial
- 30 May: The Translation of the relic of Saint Stephen – Optional Memorial
- 8 June: Saint Agnes of Bohemia, virgin – Memorial
- 15 June: Blessed Yolanda, religious – Memorial
- 27 June: Saint Ladislaus – Feast
- 2 July: Visitation of the Blessed Virgin Mary – Feast
- 11 July: Saint Benedict, abbot – Feast
- 17 July: Saints Andrew-Zoerardus and Benedict, hermits – Memorial
- 23 July: Saint Brigitta, religious – Feast
- 24 July: Saint Kinga, virgin – Memorial
- 9 August: Saint Teresa Benedicta of the Cross, virgin and martyr – Feast
- 13 August: Blessed Innocent XI, pope – Memorial
- 19 August: Saint Bernard of Clairvaux, abbot and doctor of the Church – Memorial
- 20 August: Saint Stephen of Hungary – Solemnity
- 5 September: Saint Teresa of Calcutta, virgin – Optional Memorial
- 7 September: Saints Marko Krizin, Melichar Grodecki and Stephen Pongrác, priests and martyrs – Feast
- 24 September: Saint Gerard, bishop and martyr– Feast
- 8 October: Our Lady of Hungary – Solemnity
- 25 October: Saint Maurus, bishop – Memorial
- 31 October: Blessed Theodore Romzha, bishop and martyr – Optional Memorial
- 5 November: Saint Emeric – Feast
- 13 November: All Saints and Blesseds of Hungary – Optional Memorial
- 17 November: Saint Gertrude the Great, virgin – Optional Memorial
- 19 November: Saint Elizabeth of Hungary, religious – Feast

=== India ===
- 14 January: Saint Devasahayam Pillai, martyr – Optional Memorial
- 16 January: Saint Joseph Vaz, priest – Memorial
- 4 February: Saint John de Britto, priest and martyr – Memorial
- 7 February: Saint Gonsalo Garcia, martyr – Memorial
- 18 February: Saint Kuriakose Elias Chavara, priest – Optional Memorial
- 25 February: Blessed Mariam Vattalil, virgin martyr – Optional Memorial
- 8 June: Saint Mariam Thresia Chiramel, virgin – Optional Memorial
- 3 July: Saint Thomas the Apostle – Solemnity
- 28 July: Saint Alphonsa Muttathupandathu of the Immaculate Conception, virgin – Memorial
- 30 August: Saint Euphrasia Eluvathingal, virgin – Optional Memorial
- 5 September: Saint Teresa of Kolkata, virgin – Memorial
- 16 October: Blessed Thevarparampil Kunjachan, priest – Optional Memorial
- 3 December: Saint Francis Xavier, priest – Solemnity

=== Indonesia ===
- 17 August : Independence Day – Solemnity
- 1 October : Saint Thérèse of the Child Jesus virgin and doctor of the Church – Feast
- 1 December : Blesseds Dionisius and Redemptus Indonesia's First Martyrs – Memorial
- 3 December : Saint Francis Xavier, priest and patron of Mission of the Indonesian Church – Feast

Nearest Sunday to 15 August : Assumption of the Blessed Virgin Mary – Solemnity (if the nearest Sunday is 17 August, then it will be transferred to 12 August)

=== Ireland ===
According to the national calendar of Ireland, as drawn up by the Irish Catholic Bishops' Conference and approved by the Holy See:

- 3 January: Saint Munchin, bishop – Optional Memorial
- 15 January: Saint Ita, virgin – Memorial
- 16 January: Saint Fursa, abbot and missionary – Optional Memorial
- 30 January: Saint Aidan, bishop – Optional Memorial
- 1 February: Saint Brigid, virgin – Feast
- 7 February: Saint Mel, bishop – Optional Memorial
- 11 February: Saint Gobnait, virgin – Optional Memorial
- 14 February: Saints Cyril, monk and Methodius, bishop – Feast
- 17 February: Saint Fintan – Optional Memorial
- 1 March: Saint David, bishop – Optional Memorial
- 5 March: Saint Kieran, bishop – Optional Memorial
- 8 March: Saint Senan, bishop – Optional Memorial
- 11 March: Saint Aengus (Oengus), bishop and abbot – Optional Memorial
- 17 March: Saint Patrick, bishop – Solemnity
- 21 March: Saint Enda, abbot – Optional Memorial
- 24 March: Saint Macartan, bishop – Optional Memorial
- 1 April: Saint Ceallach (Celsus), bishop – Optional Memorial
- 18 April: Saint Molaise (Laisrén, Laserian), bishop – Optional Memorial
- 27 April: Saint Asicus, bishop – Optional Memorial
- 29 April: Saint Catherine of Siena, virgin and doctor of the Church – Feast
- 4 May: Saint Conleth, bishop – Optional Memorial
- 5 May: Blessed Edmund Ignatius Rice, religious – Optional Memorial
- 10 May: Saint Comgall, abbot – Optional Memorial
- 15 May: Saint Carthage, bishop (Mochuta) – Optional Memorial
- 16 May: Saint Brendan, abbot – Optional Memorial
- 3 June: Saint Kevin, abbot – Memorial
- 6 June: Saint Jarlath, bishop – Optional Memorial
- 7 June: Saint Colman of Dromore, bishop – Optional Memorial
- 9 June: Saint Columba, abbot and missionary – Feast
- 14 June: Saint Davnet, virgin – Optional Memorial
- 20 June: Blessed Irish Martyrs – Memorial
- 1 July: Saint Oliver Plunkett, bishop and martyr – Memorial
- 6 July: Saint Moninne, virgin – Optional Memorial
- 7 July: Saint Maelruain (Maolruain), virgin – Optional Memorial
- 8 July: Saint Killian, bishop and martyr – Optional Memorial
- 11 July: Saint Benedict, abbot – Feast
- 23 July: Saint Birgitta, religious – Feast
- 24 July: Saint Declan, bishop – Optional Memorial
- 9 August: Saint Teresa Benedicta of the Cross (Edith Stein), virgin and martyr – Feast
- 9 August: In the revised liturgical calendar for Ireland, approved by the Congregation for Divine Worship and the Discipline of the Sacraments on 1 October 1998 (Protocol No. 227/97/L), optional memorials of Saint Nathy and Saint Felim were assigned to this day; outside the dioceses that celebrate them with a higher rank, their celebrations are impeded by that of Saint Teresa Benedicta of the Cross, who was later declared one of the patron saints of Europe.
- 12 August: Saint Muiredach, bishop, Saint Attracta, virgin, or Saint Lelia, virgin – Optional Memorials
- 13 August: Saint Fachtna, bishop – Optional Memorial
- 17 August: Our Lady of Knock – Feast
- 23 August: Saint Eugene (Eoghan), bishop – Optional Memorial
- 30 August: Saint Fiacre, monk – Optional Memorial
- 31 August: Saint Aidan of Lindisfarne, bishop and missionary – Optional Memorial
- 4 September: Saint Mac Nissi, bishop – Optional Memorial
- 9 September: Saint Ciaran, abbot – Memorial
- 12 September: Saint Ailbe, bishop – Optional Memorial
- 23 September: The celebration of Saint Eunan (Adomnan), abbot as an optional memorial is now generally impeded by the later assignation to this date in the General Calendar of the obligatory memorial of Saint Pio of Pietralcina
- 25 September: Saint Finbarr, bishop – Optional Memorial
- 3 October: Blessed Columba Marmion, priest – Optional Memorial (in some places)
- 9 October: Saint John Henry Newman, priest and doctor of the Church – Optional Memorial (in some places)
- 11 October: Saint Canice, abbot – Optional Memorial
- 16 October: Saint Gall, abbot and missionary – Optional Memorial
- 27 October: Saint Otteran, monk – Optional Memorial
- 29 October: Saint Colman of Kilmacduagh, bishop – Optional Memorial
- 3 November: Saint Malachy, bishop – Memorial
- 6 November: All Saints of Ireland – Feast
- 7 November: Saint Willibrord, bishop – Optional Memorial
- 14 November: Saint Laurence O'Toole, bishop – Optional Memorial
- 23 November: Saint Columban, abbot and missionary – Memorial
- 25 November Saint Colman of Cloyne, bishop – Optional Memorial
- 27 November Saint Fergal, bishop and missionary – Optional Memorial
- 12 December Saint Finnian of Clonard, bishop – Optional Memorial
- 18 December Saint Flannan, bishop – Optional Memorial
- 20 December Saint Fachanan of Kilfenora, bishop – Optional Memorial

=== Israel, Palestine, Cyprus and Jordan ===
- 3 January: The Most Holy Name of Jesus – Memorial
- 11 January: Saint Theodosius the Cenobiarch, abbot – Optional Memorial
- 20 January: Saint Euthymius, abbot – Optional Memorial
- 29 January: Saints Paula, Eustochium and Melania the Elder, religious – Optional Memorial
- 3 February: Saints Simeon and Anna, prophets – Optional Memorial
- 11 February: Dedication of the Co-Cathedral of the Most Holy Name of Jesus – Feast
- 26 February: Saint Porphyry of Gaza, bishop – Optional Memorial
- 11 March: Saint Sophronius of Jerusalem, bishop – Optional Memorial
- 18 March: Saint Cyril of Jerusalem, Bishop and Doctor of the Church – Feast
- 23 April: Saint George, martyr - Memorial
- 24 April: Saint Mary of Clopas and Other Holy Disciples of Christ – Memorial
- 27 April: Saint Simeon of Jerusalem, bishop and martyr – Memorial
- 3 May; Saint James the Minor, apostle – Solemnity
- 7 May: Discovery of the Holy Cross – Optional Memorial
- 9 May: Saint Isaiah, prophet and martyr - Memorial
- 17 May: All Holy Bishops of the Holy City of Jerusalem, Latin Patriarchate of Jerusalem – Memorial
- 21 May: Saint Helena, empress – Memorial
- 11 June: Saint Barnabas, apostle – Memorial (Solemnity for Cyprus)
- 14 June: Saint Elisha, prophet – Optional Memorial
- 23 June: Saint Zenon, Saint Zenas, martyrs, and all holy martyrs of Transjordan - Optional Memorial
- 25 June: Saint Zachariah and Saint Elizabeth, parents of Saint John the Baptist - Memorial
- 15 July: Dedication of the Church of the Holy Sepulchre – Feast
- 16 July: Our Lady of Mount Carmel – Memorial
- 20 July: Saint Elijah, prophet - Memorial
- 21 July: Saint Jeremiah, prophet and martyr - Memorial
- 3 August: The Holy Maccabees, martyrs – Optional Memorial
- 26 August: Saint Mary of Jesus Crucified, virgin – Memorial
- 29 August: The Passion of Saint John the Baptist, Martyr – Solemnity
- 31 August: Saints Joseph of Arimathea and Nicodemus – Optional Memorial
- 4 September: Saint Moses, prophet – Memorial
- 14 September: The Exaltation of the Holy Cross – Solemnity
- 17 September: Saint Albert of Jerusalem, bishop and martyr – Optional Memorial
- 9 October: Saint Abraham, patriarch – Memorial
- 11 October: Saint Philip the Evangelist, deacon – Optional Memorial
- 12 October: Saint Dismas – Optional Memorial
- 16 October: Saint Longinus – Optional Memorial
- 20 October: Saint Cornelius the Centurion - Optional Memorial
- 21 October: Saint Hilarion, abbot - Optional Memorial
- 25 October: Our Lady, Queen of Palestine – Solemnity
- 8 November: All Saints of the Church of Jerusalem – Feast
- 13 November: Saint Philip the Apostle – Feast
- 14 November: Saint Nikola Tavelić, priest and martyr – Optional Memorial
- 19 November: Saint Marie-Alphonsine Danil Ghattas, foundress – Memorial
- 4 December: Saint John Damascene, Priest and Doctor of the Church – Memorial
- 5 December: Saint Sabbas, abbot – Memorial
- 15 December: Saint David the King and All Ancestors of our Lord Jesus Christ – Memorial
- Thursday after Trinity Sunday: The Most Holy Body and Blood of Christ – Solemnity

=== Japan ===
- 3 February: Blessed Iustus Takayama Ukon, martyr – Memorial
- 5 February: Saints Paul Miki and companions, martyrs – Feast
- 6 February: Saint Agatha, virgin and martyr – Memorial
- 17 March: Our Lady of the Discovery of the Hidden Christians – Feast
- 1 July: Saint Peter Kibe, priest and companions, martyrs – Memorial
- 10 September: 205 Blessed Martyrs of Japan – Memorial
- 28 September: Saint Thomas Rokuzayemon, priest and companions, martyrs – Memorial
- 3 December: Saint Francis Xavier, priest – Feast

=== Korea ===
- 29 May: Blessed Paul Yun Ji-Chung and companions, martyrs – Optional Memorial
- 25 June: Day of Prayer for National Reconciliation and Unification
- 5 July: Saint Andrew Kim Taegon, priest and martyr – Solemnity
- 20 September: Saint Andrew Kim Taegon, priest, and Paul Chong Hasang and companions, martyrs – Solemnity
- 1 October: Saint Thérèse of the Child Jesus, virgin and doctor of the Church – Feast
- 3 December: Saint Francis Xavier, priest – Feast
- 15th day of the 8th month of the lunisolar calendar: Hangawi

=== Kuwait, Bahrain, Qatar, Saudi Arabia ===
- Saturday preceding the Second Sunday of Ordinary Time: Our Lady of Arabia – Feast (can be transferred on Friday)
- 27 June: Our Lady of Perpetual Help – Memorial
- 5 September: Saint Teresa of Calcutta, religious – Memorial
- 24 October: Saint Arethas and companions, martyrs – Memorial

=== Lebanon ===
- 9 February: Saint Maroun – Memorial
- 23 March: Saint Rafqa (Rebecca), virgin – Memorial
- 23 April: Saint George, martyr – Memorial
- 1 May: Our Lady of Lebanon – Feast
- 4 December: Saint Barbara, virgin and martyr – Memorial
- 6 December: Saint Nicholas, bishop – Memorial
- 24 December: Saint Charbel, priest – Optional Memorial

=== Lithuania ===
- 27 January: Blessed Jurgis Matulaitis-Matulevičius, bishop – Memorial
- 14 February: Saints Cyril, monk and Methodius, bishop – Feast
- 4 March: Saint Casimir – Feast
- 9 March: Saint Bruno Boniface of Querfurt, bishop and martyr – Optional Memorial
- 23 April: Saint Adalbert, bishop and martyr – Optional Memorial
- 29 April: Saint Catherine of Siena, virgin and doctor of the Church – Feast
- 16 May: Saint Andrew Bobola, priest and martyr – Optional Memorial
- 2 July: Our Lady, Queen of Families – Optional Memorial
- 11 July: Saint Benedict, abbot – Feast
- 23 July: Saint Birgitta, religious – Feast
- 9 August: Saint Teresa Benedicta of the Cross (Edith Stein), virgin and martyr – Feast
- 17 August: Saint Hyacinth – Optional Memorial
- 8 September: Birth of the Blessed Virgin Mary – Solemnity
- 5 October: Saint Faustina Kowalska, religious – Optional Memorial
- 16 November: Our Lady, Mother of Mercy – Solemnity

=== Luxembourg ===
- 3 January: Saint Irmine, abbess – Optional Memorial
- 14 February: Saints Cyril, monk and Methodius, bishop – Feast
- 29 April: Saint Catherine of Siena, virgin and doctor of the Church – Feast
- 11 July: Saint Benedict, abbot – Feast
- 13 July: Saints Henry and Cunigunde – Memorial
- 23 July: Saint Birgitta, religious – Feast
- 9 August: Saint Teresa Benedicta of the Cross (Edith Stein), virgin and martyr – Feast
- 11 August: Blessed Ghislaine – Optional Memorial
- 18 September: Saint Lambert of Maastricht, bishop and martyr – Optional Memorial
- 3 November: Saint Hubert, bishop – Memorial
- 7 November: Saint Willibrord, bishop – Feast
- Second Saturday after the Solemnity of Corpus Christi: Our Lady, Comforter of the Afflicted – Solemnity

=== Madagascar ===
- 19 May: Blessed Raphaël Rafiringa, religious – Memorial
- 21 August: Blessed Victoria Rasoamanarivo, virgin - Optional Memorial
- 3 October: Blessed John Beyzym, priest - Memorial

=== Malta ===
- 22 January: Saint Publius, bishop – Memorial
- 10 February: Shipwreck of Saint Paul, apostle – Solemnity
- 14 February: Saints Cyril, monk and Methodius, bishop – Feast
- 25 February: Blessed Maria Adeodata Pisani, virgin – Optional Memorial
- Friday before Good Friday: Our Lady of Sorrows – Feast
- 23 April: Saint George, martyr – Memorial
- 29 April: Saint Catherine of Siena, virgin and doctor of the Church – Feast
- 30 April: Saint Pius V, pope – Memorial
- 1 May: Saint Joseph the Worker – Memorial
- 9 May: Saint George Preca, priest – Feast
- 1 July: Blessed Nazju Falzon – Optional Memorial
- 11 July: Saint Benedict, abbot – Feast
- 16 July: Our Lady of Mount Carmel – Memorial
- 23 July: Saint Birgitta, religious – Feast
- 9 August: Saint Teresa Benedicta of the Cross (Edith Stein), virgin and martyr – Feast
- 8 September: Birth of the Blessed Virgin Mary – Feast

=== Mexico ===
- 5 February: Saint Felipe de Jesús, priest and martyr – Feast
- 25 February: Blessed Sebastián de Aparicio, religious – Optional Memorial
- 27 April: Saint María Guadalupe García Zavala, virgin – Optional Memorial
- 3 May: Exaltation of the Holy Cross – Feast
- 4 May: Saint Philip and Saint James, apostles – Feast
- 15 May: Saint Isidore the Laborer – Memorial
- 16 May: Saint John Nepomucene, priest and martyr – Optional Memorial
- 21 May: Saint Cristóbal Magallanes and companions, martyrs – Memorial
- 27 June: Our Lady of Perpetual Help – Optional Memorial
- 4 July: Our Lady of Refuge – Optional Memorial
- 30 July: Saint María de Jesús Sacramentado Venegas, virgin – Optional Memorial
- 16 August: Blessed Bartolomé Días Laurel, religious and martyr or Blessed Pedro de Zúñiga and Blessed Luis Flores, priests and martyrs – Optional Memorial
- 26 August: Saint Junípero Serra, priest – Optional Memorial
- 30 August: Saint Rose of Lima, virgin – Feast
- 19 September: Saint José Maria de Yermo, priest – Optional Memorial
- 24 September: Our Lady of Mercy – Memorial
- 24 October: Saint Rafael Guízar y Valencia, bishop – Feast
- 23 November: Blessed Miguel Agustín Pro, priest and martyr – Optional Memorial
- 9 December: Saint Juan Diego – Memorial
- 12 December: Our Lady of Guadalupe – Solemnity
- Thursday after Pentecost: Our Lord Jesus Christ, the Eternal High Priest – Feast

=== Monaco ===
- 16 January: Saint Honoratus of Arles, bishop - Memorial
- 27 January: Saint Devota of Corsica, virgin and martyr - Solemnity
- 15 May: Saint Pontius of Cimiez, martyr - Optional Memorial
- 21 May: Saint Hospitius, hermit - Optional Memorial
- 11 June: Dedication of the Cathedral of the Archdiocese of Monaco - Feast
- 12 June: St. Barnabas, apostle - Memorial
- 7 August: Saint Teresa Benedicta of the Cross, virgin and martyr - Feast
- 9 August: Saint Romanus Ostiarus, martyr - Feast
- 16 August: St. Roch of Montpellier - Memorial

=== Mozambique ===
- Monday after Pentecost: Our Lady, Mother of the Church – Feast
- 13 May: Our Lady of Fatima – Memorial
- 3 June: Saints Charles Lwanga and companions, martyrs – Feast
- 5 August: Our Lady of Africa – Memorial
- 28 August: Saint Augustine of Hippo, bishop and doctor of the Church – Feast
- 9 September: Saint Peter Claver, priest – Memorial
- Saturday before the last Sunday in October: Immaculate Heart of Mary – Solemnity
- 3 October: Saint Thérèse of the Child Jesus, virgin and doctor of the Church – Feast
- 3 December: Saint Francis Xavier, priest – Feast

=== Netherlands ===
- 14 January: Blessed Peter Donders, priest – Optional Memorial
- 15 January: Saint Arnold Janssen, priest -Optional Memorial
- 14 February: Saints Cyril, monk and Methodius, bishop – Feast
- 29 April: Saint Catherine of Siena, virgin and doctor of the Church – Feast
- 5 June: Saint Boniface, bishop and martyr, and companions, martyrs – Memorial
- 14 June: Saint Lidwina, virgin – Feast
- 9 July: The Martyrs of Gorkum – Feast
- 11 July: Saint Benedict, abbot – Feast
- 23 July: Saint Brigitta, religious – Feast
- 27 July: Saint Titus Brandsma, priest and martyr – Memorial
- 9 August: Saint Teresa Benedicta of the Cross, virgin and martyr – Feast
- 3 November: Saint Hubert, bishop – Memorial
- 6 November: The Preachers of the Faith in Netherlands – Feast
- 7 November: Saint Willibrord, bishop – Solemnity

=== New Zealand ===
- 6 February: Waitangi Day
- 7 February: Saint Paul Miki and companions – Memorial
- 17 March: Saint Patrick, bishop – Feast
- 26 April: Saint Mark, apostle – Feast
- 27 April: Saint Louis Grignon de Montfort, priest – Optional Memorial
- 28 April: Saint Peter Chanel, priest and martyr – Feast
- 24 May: Our Lady, Help of Christians – Memorial
- 6 June: Saint Marcellin Champagnat, priest – Optional Memorial
- 3 August: Saint Dominic, priest – Memorial
- 8 August: Saint Mary MacKillop, virgin – Feast

=== Nigeria ===
- 9 January: Saint Adrian of Canterbury, abbot – Optional Memorial
- 19 January: Saint Fabian, pope and martyr; or Saint Sebastian, martyr – Optional Memorial
- 20 January: Blessed Cyprian Michael Tansi, priest – Feast
- 26 February: Saint Alexander of Alexandria, bishop – Optional Memorial
- 17 March: Saint Patrick, bishop – Feast
- 4 April: Saint Benedict, religious or Saint Isidore, bishop and doctor of the Church – Optional Memorial
- 12 April: Saint Zeno of Verona, bishop – Optional Memorial
- 20 April: Saint Marcellinus, bishop – Optional Memorial
- 28 April: Saint Pius V, pope; or Saint Peter Chanel, priest and martyr; or Saint Louis Grignon de Montfort, priest – Optional Memorial
- 30 April: Our Lady, Mother of Africa – Feast
- 24 May: Blessed Virgin Mary, Help of Christians – Memorial
- 29 May: Blessed Joseph Gerard, priest – Optional Memorial
- 12 June: Saint Onuphrius, hermit – Optional Memorial
- 28 July: Saint Victor I, pope and martyr – Optional Memorial
- 30 July: Saint Justin de Jacobis, bishop; or Saint Peter Chrysologus, bishop and doctor of the Church – Optional Memorial
- 12 August: Blessed Isidore Bakanja, martyr; or Saint Jane Frances de Chantal, religious – Optional Memorial
- 18 August: Blessed Victoria Rasoamanarivo – Optional Memorial
- 22 September: Saint Maurice and companions, martyrs – Optional Memorial
- 1 October: Our Lady, Queen of Nigeria – Solemnity
- 3 October: Saint Thérèse of the Child Jesus, virgin and doctor of the Church – Memorial
- 10 October: Saint Daniel Comboni, bishop – Memorial
- 20 October: Blessed Daudi Okelo and Jildo Irwa, martyrs – Optional Memorial
- 6 November: All Saints of Africa – Memorial
- 1 December: Blessed Clementine Anuarite, virgin and martyr – Optional Memorial

=== North Africa (Algeria, Libya, Morocco, Tunisia) ===
The dioceses within Algeria, Libya, Morocco, and Tunisia constitute one Episcopal Conference, and so share one regional proper calendar.

- 3 January: Saint Fulgentius of Ruspe, bishop – Memorial
- 5 January: Saints Longinus, Eugenius, and Vindemial, bishops and martyrs – Optional Memorial
- 8 January: Saints Quodvultdeus and Deogratias, bishops – Optional Memorial
- 11 January: Saints Victor I, Miltiades, and Gelasius I, popes – Memorial
- 4 February: Saint Celerina and companions, martyrs – Optional Memorial
- 7 March: Saints Perpetua and Felicity, martyrs – Feast
- 30 April: Our Lady of Africa – Feast
- 6 May: Saints James, Marianus, and companions, martyrs – Optional Memorial
- 4 June: Saint Optatus, bishop – Memorial
- 10 July: Saint Marciana, martyr – Optional Memorial
- 17 July: Saint Speratus and companions, martyrs – Memorial
- 23 August: Saint Emily de Vialar, religious – Optional Memorial
- 27 August: Saint Monica – Feast
- 28 August: Saint Augustine, bishop and doctor of the Church – Solemnity
- 30 August: Saints Alypius and Possidius, bishops – Memorial
- 10 September: Saint Nemesius and companions, martyrs – Optional Memorial
- 12 September: Saint Marcellinus, martyr – Optional Memorial
- 16 September: Saint Cyprian, bishop and martyr – Solemnity
- 30 October: Saints Marcellus and Maximilian of Tebessa, martyrs – Memorial
- 5 December: Saint Crispina of Numidia, virgin and martyr – Memorial

=== Norway ===
From the website of the Catholic Church in Norway

- 8 January: Saint Thorfinn, bishop – Optional Memorial
- 19 January: Saint Henry, bishop and martyr – Memorial
- 26 January: Saint Eysteinn, bishop – Optional Memorial
- 14 February: Saints Cyril, monk and Methodius, bishop – Feast
- 16 April: Saint Magnus, martyr – Memorial
- 29 April: Saint Catherine of Siena, virgin and doctor of the Church – Feast
- 18 May: Saint Eric IX, martyr – Memorial
- 8 July: Saint Sunniva, virgin and martyr – Memorial
- 10 July: Saint Canute, martyr – Memorial
- 11 July: Saint Benedict, abbot – Feast
- 15 July: Saint Swithun, bishop – Optional Memorial
- 20 July: Saint Thorlac, bishop – Memorial
- 23 July: Saint Brigitta, religious – Feast
- 29 July: Saint Olaf, martyr – Solemnity
- 9 August: Saint Teresa Benedicta of the Cross, virgin and martyr – Feast
- 25 November: Blessed Nicolas Steno, bishop – Memorial

=== Panama ===
- 6 May: Saint Martin de Porres, religious – Feast
- 23 August: Saint Rose of Lima, virgin – Feast
- 9 September: Our Lady of Antigua, Patroness of Panama – Solemnity
- 24 September: Our Lady of Mercy – Feast
- 12 December: Our Lady of Guadalupe – Feast
- Thursday after Pentecost: Our Lord Jesus Christ, the Eternal High Priest – Feast

=== Paraguay ===
- 3 February: Saint Blase, bishop and martyr – Feast
- 16 July: Our Lady of Mount Carmel – Optional Memorial
- 23 August: Saint Rose of Lima, virgin – Feast
- 17 November: Saints Roque González, Alfonso Rodríguez, and Juan del Castillo, priests and martyrs – Solemnity
- 19 November: Saint Elizabeth of Hungary, religious – Memorial
- 12 December: Our Lady of Guadalupe – Feast
- Thursday after Pentecost: Our Lord Jesus Christ, the Eternal High Priest – Feast

=== Peru ===
- 3 May: Finding of the Holy Cross – Feast
- 24 May: Our Lady, Help of Christians – Optional Memorial
- 26 May: Saint Mariana de Jesús de Paredes, virgin – Feast
- 14 July: Saint Francis Solanus, priest – Feast
- 28 July: Our Lady of Peace – Feast
- 30 August: Saint Rose of Lima, virgin – Solemnity
- 18 September: Saint John Macias, religious – Feast
- 24 September: Our Lady of Mercy – Optional Memorial
- 12 October: Saint Carlo Acutis – Optional Memorial
- 28 October: Our Lord of Miracles – Feast
- 3 November: Saint Martin de Porres, religious – Solemnity
- 12 December: Our Lady of Guadalupe – Feast
- Thursday after Pentecost: Our Lord Jesus Christ, the Eternal High Priest – Feast

=== Philippines ===
In accordance with the 128th Plenary Assembly of the Catholic Bishops' Conference of the Philippines:

- 9 January: Translation of the Jesús Nazareno - Feast
- 15 January: Saint Arnold Janssen, priest – Optional Memorial
- Third Sunday of January: Santo Niño (Holy Child Jesus) – Feast
- 6 February: Saints Pedro Bautista, Paul Miki, and companions, martyrs – Memorial
- 15 May: Saint Isidore the Laborer – Memorial
- 21 May: Saint Eugene de Mazenod, Bishop – Optional Memorial
- Thursday after Pentecost Sunday: Our Lord Jesus Christ, the Eternal High Priest – Feast
- 16 August: Saint Roch – Optional Memorial
- 19 August: Saint Ezequiel Moreno, Bishop – Memorial
- 23 August: Saint Rose of Lima, Virgin and Secondary Patroness of the Philippines – Memorial
- 28 September: Saint Lorenzo Ruiz and companions, martyrs – Feast
- 21 October: Saint Pedro Calungsod, martyr – Feast
- Wednesday after the Solemnity of Christ the King: Votive Mass for Persecuted Christians
- 8 December: The Immaculate Conception of the Blessed Virgin Mary, Principal Patroness of the Philippine Islands – Solemnity (Holy Day of Obligation)
- 12 December: Our Lady of Guadalupe, Heavenly Patroness of the Philippines – Memorial

=== Poland ===
- 19 January: Saint Józef Sebastian Pelczar, bishop – Memorial
- 22 January: Saint Vincent Pallotti, priest – Optional Memorial
- 14 February: Saints Cyril, Monk and Methodius, bishop – Feast
- 4 March: Saint Casimir – Feast
- 23 April: Saint Adalbert, bishop and martyr – Solemnity
- 24 April: Saint Fidelis of Sigmaringen, priest and martyr or Saint George, martyr – Optional Memorials
- 29 April: Saint Catherine of Siena, virgin and doctor of the Church – Feast
- 3 May: Our Lady, Queen of Poland – Solemnity
- 4 May: Saint Florian, martyr – Memorial
- 5 May: Saint Stanisław Kazimierczyk, priest – Optional Memorial
- 6 May: Saints Philip and James, apostles – Feast
- 8 May: Saint Stanislaus, bishop and martyr – Solemnity
- 16 May: Saint Andrew Bobola, priest and martyr – Feast
- 24 May: Our Lady, Help of Christians – Memorial
- 29 May: Saint Ursula Ledóchowska, virgin – Memorial
- 30 May: Saint John Sarkander, priest and martyr or Saint Zdzisława – Optional Memorials
- 8 June: Saint Hedwig the Queen – Memorial
- 12 June: Blessed Antoni Nowowiejski, bishop and companions, martyrs – Optional Memorial
- 14 June: Blessed Michael Kozal, bishop and martyr – Memorial
- 17 June: Saint Albert Chmielowski, religious – Memorial
- 26 June: Saint Zygmunt Gorazdowski, priest – Optional Memorial
- 1 July: Saint Otto, bishop – Optional Memorial
- 5 July: Saint Anthony Zaccaria, priest or Saint Maria Goretti, virgin and martyr – Optional Memorials
- 6 July: Blessed Maria Teresia Ledóchowska, virgin – Memorial
- 8 July: Saint John of Dukla, priest – Memorial
- 11 July: Saint Benedict, abbot – Feast
- 12 July: Saint Bruno Boniface of Querfurt, bishop and martyr – Memorial
- 13 July: Saints Andrzej Świerad and Benedict, hermits – Memorial
- 14 July: Saint Camillus de Lellis, priest, or Saint Henry – Optional Memorial
- 18 July: Saint Simon of Lipnica, priest – Optional Memorial
- 20 July: Blessed Czesław, priest – Optional Memorial
- 23 July: Saint Bridget, religious, Patron of Europe – Feast
- 24 July: Saint Kinga, virgin – Memorial
- 28 July: Saint Sharbel Makhluf, hermit – Optional Memorial
- 9 August: Saint Teresa Benedicta of the Cross, virgin and martyr – Feast
- 17 August: Saint Hyacinth, priest – Memorial
- 26 August: Our Lady of Częstochowa – Solemnity
- 4 September: Blessed Maria Stella and companions, virgins and martyrs – Optional Memorial
- 7 September: Saint Melchior Grodziecki, priest and martyr – Optional Memorial
- 17 September: Saint Zygmunt Szczęsny Feliński, bishop – Optional Memorial
- 18 September: Saint Stanisław Kostka, religious – Feast
- 5 October: Saint Faustina Kowalska, religious – Memorial
- 12 October: Blessed John Beyzym, priest – Optional Memorial
- 13 October: Blessed Honorat Koźmiński, priest – Memorial
- 16 October: Saint Hedwig of Poland – Memorial
- 20 October: Saint John of Kęty, priest – Memorial
- 22 October: Saint John Paul II, pope – Memorial
- 23 October: Saint Josef Bilczewski, bishop – Optional Memorial
- 13 November: Saints Benedykt, Jan, Mateusz, Isaak and Krystyn, the first martyrs of Poland – Memorial
- 18 November: Blessed Karolina Kózkówna, virgin and martyr – Memorial
- 20 November: Saint Rafał Kalinowski, priest – Memorial
- 4 December: Saint Barbara, virgin and martyr – Optional Memorial
- Monday after Pentecost: Mary, Mother of the Church – Feast
- Thursday after Pentecost: Our Lord Jesus Christ, the Eternal High Priest – Feast

=== Portugal ===
As by the Secretariado Nacional de Liturgia (National Secretariat of Liturgy):

- 11 January: Blessed Gonçalo de Amarante, priest – Optional Memorial
- 4 February: Saint John de Brito, priest and martyr – Memorial
- 7 February: The Five Wounds of the Lord – Feast
- 14 February: Saints Cyril, Monk and Methodius, bishop – Feast
- 18 February: Saint Theotonius, priest – Memorial
- 20 February: Saints Jacinta and Francisco Marto – Optional Memorial
- 8 March: Saint John of God, priest – Memorial
- 29 April: Saint Catherine of Siena, virgin and doctor of the Church – Feast
- 12 May: Blessed Joan of Portugal, virgin – Optional Memorial
- 13 May: Our Lady of Fátima – Feast
- 10 June: Guardian Angel of Portugal – Memorial
- 13 June: Saint Anthony of Lisbon, priest and doctor of the Church – Feast
- 20 June: Blessed Sancha and Mafalda, virgins, or Blessed Theresa of Portugal, religious – Optional Memorials
- 4 July: Saint Elizabeth of Portugal – Memorial
- 11 July: Saint Benedict, Abbot – Feast
- 17 July: Blessed Inácio de Azevedo, priest, and companions, martyrs – Memorial
- 18 July: Blessed Bartholomew of the Martyrs, bishop – Memorial
- 23 July: Saint Brigitta, religious – Feast
- 9 August: Saint Teresa Benedicta of the Cross, virgin and martyr – Feast
- 17 August: Saint Beatrice of Silva, virgin – Memorial
- 27 October: Blessed Gonçalo de Lagos, priest – Optional Memorial
- 6 November: Saint Nuno of Saint Mary – Memorial
- 5 December: Saint Fructuosus, Saint Martin of Dume and Saint Gerald, bishops – Memorial

=== Puerto Rico ===
According to the proper calendar of Puerto Rico, as requested by the Puerto Rican Episcopal Conference and approved by the Holy See:

- 3 January: Our Lady of Bethlehem – Optional Memorial (Memorial – San Juan)
- 10 January: Blessed María Dolores Rodríguez Sopeña, virgin – Optional Memorial
- 4 May: Blessed Carlos Manuel Cecilio Rodríguez Santiago – Optional Memorial (Memorial - Caguas)
- 24 June: Nativity of John the Baptist, Patron Saint of Archdiocese of San Juan – Solemnity (San Juan)
- 27 June: Our Lady of Perpetual Help, Patron Saint of Diocese of Arecibo – Feast (Arecibo)
- 16 July: Our Lady of Mount Carmel (also: Co-Patron Saint of Diocese of Fajardo-Humacao) – Feast
- 25 July: Saint James the Apostle, Co-Patron Saint of Diocese of Fajardo-Humacao – Feast (Fajardo-Humacao)
- First Thursday of July: Rogation at the Beginning of the Hurricane Season
- 26 August: Saint Teresa of Jesus Jornet e Ibars, virgin – Optional Memorial
- 30 August: Saint Rose of Lima, virgin – Feast
- 31 August: Beheading of John the Baptist – Memorial (Mayagüez)
- 8 September: Our Lady of Monserrate of Hormigueros, Patron Saint of Diocese of Mayagüez – Feast (Mayagüez)
- 10 September: Blesseds Carlos Spínola and Jerónimo de Angelis, priests and martyrs – Optional Memorial
- 11 October: Saint Soledad Torres y Acosta, virgin – Optional Memorial
- 20 October: Saint Junipero Serra, priest – Memorial
- 24 October: Saint Antonio Maria Claret, bishop – Memorial
- 3 November: Saint Martin de Porres, religious – Memorial
- 6 November: Blessed Fernando Llovera Puigsech, priest, and companions, martyrs – Optional Memorial (Arecibo)
- 19 November: Our Lady, Mother of Divine Providence, Patroness of Puerto Rico – Solemnity
- 27 November: Our Lady of the Miraculous Medal – Optional Memorial
- Fourth Thursday of November: Ember Day of Thanksgiving and Rogation for Human Activity
- 9 December: Saint Juan Diego, Guadalupe Seer – Optional Memorial
- 12 December: Our Lady of Guadalupe (also: Patron Saint of Diocese of Ponce) – Feast
- 16 December: Expectation of the Blessed Virgin Mary – Memorial
- II & III Feriae of the IV Week of Easter: Rogation for Vocations to Holy Orders and Consecrated Life
- Monday after Pentecost: Blessed Mary, Mother of the Church, Patron Saint of the Diocese of Caguas – Feast (Caguas)
- Thursday after Pentecost: Our Lord Jesus Christ, the Eternal High Priest – Feast

=== Romania ===
- 14 February: Saints Cyril, monk and Methodius, bishop – Feast
- 28 February: Saint John Cassian, priest – Memorial
- 29 April: Saint Catherine of Siena, virgin and doctor of the Church – Feast
- 16 May: Blessed Vladimir Ghika, priest and martyr – Optional Memorial
- 11 July: Saint Benedict, abbot – Feast
- 23 July: Saint Birgitta, religious – Feast
- 9 August: Saint Teresa Benedicta of the Cross (Edith Stein), virgin and martyr – Feast

=== Russia ===
- 27 January: Blessed George Matulewicz, bishop – Memorial
- 29 January: Blessed Bolesława Maria Lament, virgin – Optional Memorial
- 14 February: Saints Cyril, monk and Methodius, bishop – Feast
- 29 April: Saint Catherine of Siena, virgin and doctor of the Church – Feast (in European Russia)
- 6 May: Saint George, martyr – Memorial
- 16 May: Saint Theodosius of the Caves, abbot – Memorial
- 27 June: Our Lady of Perpetual Help or Blessed Leonid Feodorov, priest and Martyr – Optional Memorial
- 11 July: Saint Benedict, abbot – Feast (in European Russia)
- 23 July: Saint Birgitta, religious – Feast (in European Russia)
- 24 July: Saint Anthony of the Caves, monk – Optional Memorial
- 24 July: Saint Olga – Optional Memorial
- 28 July: Saint Vladimir the Great – Memorial
- 5 August: Saints Boris and Gleb, martyrs – Optional Memorial
- 9 August: Saint Teresa Benedicta of the Cross (Edith Stein), virgin and martyr – Feast (in European Russia)
- 26 August: Our Lady of Częstochowa – Optional Memorial
- 7 September: Our Lady of Vladimir – Optional Memorial
- 5 October: Saint Faustina Kowalska, virgin – Memorial
- 30 October: Blessed Oleksiy Zarytskyi, priest and martyr – Memorial
- 16 November: Our Lady of the Gate of Dawn – Optional Memorial
- 20 November: Saint Rafał Kalinowski, priest – Memorial
- 30 November: Saint Andrew the Apostle, patron of Russia – Solemnity
- 4 December: Saint Barbara, virgin and martyr – Optional Memorial
- 6 December: Saint Nicholas, bishop – Memorial

=== Rwanda ===
- 27 January: Saint John Maria Muzeyi, martyr - memorial
- Sunday after the Solemnity of the Sacred Heart: Saint Charles Lwanga and companions, martyrs - Solemnity
- 15 November: Saint Joseph Mukasa Balikuddembe, martyr - Memorial
- 28 November: Our Lady of Kibeho - Solemnity

=== San Marino ===
- 3rd Friday of March: Our Lady, Mother of Graces - Feast
- 4 June: Saint Quirinus of Sescia, bishop and martyr - Memorial
- 17 June: Dedication of the Cathedral of the Diocese of San Marino - Feast
- 20 July: Saint Bridget of Sweden, co-patroness of Europe - Feast
- 23 July: Saint Apollinaris of Ravenna, bishop and martyr - Feast
- 1 August: Saint Leo of Montefeltro, bishop - Feast
- 3 September: Saint Marinus, deacon - Feast
- 11 September: Blessed Domenico Spadafora, religious - Memorial
- 8 November: All Saints of San Marino - Memorial
- 10 December: Our Lady of Loreto - Feast

=== São Tomé and Principé ===
- 3 January: The Most Holy Name of Jesus – Memorial
- 4 February: Saint John de Brito, priest and martyr – Memorial
- 13 May: Our Lady of Fatima – Feast
- Saturday following the second Sunday after Pentecost: Immaculate Heart of Mary – Solemnity
- 3 June: Saints Charles Lwanga and companions, martyrs – Feast
- 5 August: Our Lady of Africa – Memorial
- 28 August: Saint Augustine of Hippo, bishop and doctor of the Church – Feast
- 9 September: Saint Peter Claver, priest – Memorial
- 3 October: Saint Thérèse of the Child Jesus, virgin and doctor of the Church – Feast
- 3 December: Saint Francis Xavier, priest – Feast
- 21 December: Saint Thomas the Apostle – Solemnity

=== Scotland ===
According to the national calendar of Scotland, as requested by the Bishops' Conference of Scotland and approved by the Holy See:

- 13 January: Saint Kentigern – Memorial
- 14 February: Saints Cyril, Monk and Methodius – Feast
- 10 March: Saint John Ogilvie – Feast
- 17 March: Saint Patrick – Feast
- 29 April: Saint Catherine of Siena – Feast
- 9 June: Saint Columba – Memorial
- 11 July: Saint Benedict – Feast
- 23 July: Saint Birgitta – Feast
- 9 August: Saint Teresa Benedicta of the Cross (Edith Stein) – Feast
- 16 September: Saint Ninian – Memorial
- 16 November: Saint Margaret of Scotland – Feast
- 30 November: Saint Andrew the Apostle – Solemnity

=== Slovakia ===
According to Všeobecný kalendár Rímskej cirkvi a osobitný kalendár diecéz na Slovensku (General calendar of the Roman Church and special calendar of dioceses in Slovakia) as printed in the Slovak translation of Roman Missal, ed. typ. tertia, released in 2021.

- 23 April: Saint Adalbert, bishop and martyr – Memorial
- 24 April: Saint George, martyr – Optional Memorial
- 29 April: Saint Catherine of Siena, virgin and doctor of the Church, patroness of Europe – Feast
- 4 May: Saint Florian, martyr – Optional Memorial
- 11 May: Blessed Sára Salkaházi, virgin and martyr – Optional Memorial
- 16 May: Saint John Nepomucene, priest and martyr – Memorial
- 2 July: Visitation of the Blessed Virgin Mary – Feast
- 5 July: Saints Cyril, monk, and Methodius, bishop, Slavic Missionaries, patrons of Europe – Solemnity
- 7 July: Saint Anthony Zaccaria, priest – Optional Memorial
- 11 July: Saint Benedict, abbot, patron of Europe – Feast
- 17 July: Saints Andrew Zorard and Benedict, eremites – Memorial
- 23 July: Saint Bridget, religious, patroness of Europe – Feast
- 27 July: Saint Gorazd and companions – Memorial
- 30 July: Blessed Zdenka Cecília Schelingová, virgin and martyr – Optional Memorial
- 9 August: Saint Teresa Benedicta of the Cross, virgin and martyr, patroness of Europe – Feast
- 18 August: Saint Helena – Optional Memorial
- 7 September: Saints Marko Krizin, Melchior Grodziecki and Stephen Pongracz, priests and martyrs – Memorial
- 15 September: Our Lady of Sorrows, patroness of Slovakia – Solemnity
- 16 October: Saint Gall, priest – Optional Memorial
- 25 October: Saint Maurus, bishop – Optional Memorial
- 26 October: Dedication of consecrated churches whose date of Consecration is unknown – Solemnity
- 2 November: All Souls – Memorial
- 4 December: Saint Barbara, virgin and martyr – Optional Memorial
- Thursday after Pentecost: Our Lord Jesus Christ, the Eternal High Priest – Feast

=== Slovenia ===
- 11 January: Saint Paulinus II of Aquileia, bishop – Memorial
- 22 January: Saint Angela Merici, virgin – Memorial
- 3 February: Saint Blase, bishop and martyr – Memorial
- 24 February: Saint Matthias, apostle – Feast
- 16 April: Saint Bernadette Soubirous, virgin – Memorial
- 29 April: Saint Catherine of Siena, virgin and doctor of the Church – Feast
- 1 May: Saint Joseph the Worker – Feast
- 4 May: Saint Florian, martyr – Memorial
- 12 May: Saint Leopold Mandić, priest – Memorial
- 16 May: Saint John Nepomucene, priest and martyr – Memorial
- 24 May: Our Lady, Help of Christians – Solemnity
- 27 June: Saint Hemma of Gurk – Memorial
- 5 July: Saints Cyril, monk and Methodius, bishop – Solemnity
- 11 July: Saint Benedict, abbot – Feast
- 12 July: Saints Hermargoras, bishop and Fortunatus, deacon; martyrs – Memorial
- 23 July: Saint Brigitta, religious – Feast
- 27 July: Saints Gorazd and Clement, bishops – Memorial
- 9 August: Saint Teresa Benedicta of the Cross, virgin and martyr – Feast
- 24 September: Blessed Anton Martin Slomšek, bishop – Feast
- 3 November: Saint Victorinus of Pettau, bishop and martyr – Memorial
- 27 November: Saints Modestus and Virgilius, bishops – Memorial
- 6 December: Saint Nicholas, bishop – Memorial
- Monday after Pentecost: Mary, Mother of the Church – Feast
- Saturday following the second Sunday after Pentecost: Immaculate Heart of Mary – Feast

=== Spain ===
- 9 January: Saint Eulogius of Córdoba, bishop – Optional Memorial
- 20 January: Saints Fructuosus, bishop, and Augurius and Eulogius, deacons, martyrs – Optional Memorial
- 22 January: Saint Vincent, deacon and martyr – Memorial
- 23 January: Saint Ildephonsus of Toledo, bishop – Memorial
- 14 February: Saints Cyril, monk, and Methodius, bishop, Patrons of Europe – Feast
- 13 April: Saint Hermenegild, martyr – Optional Memorial
- 24 April: Saint Peter of Saint Joseph de Betancur, missionary – Memorial
- 26 April: Saint Isidore of Seville, bishop and Doctor of the Church – Feast
- 29 April: Saint Catherine of Siena, virgin and Doctor of the Church, Patron of Europe – Feast
- 10 May: Saint John of Avila, priest and Doctor of the Church – Memorial
- 15 May: Saint Isidore the Farmer – Memorial
- 17 May: Saint Paschal Baylon – Optional Memorial
- 22 May: Saint Joaquina Vedruna – Optional Memorial
- 30 May: Saint Ferdinand – Optional Memorial
- 9 June: Saint José de Anchieta, missionary – Memorial
- 15 June: Saint María Micaela of the Blessed Sacrament, virgin – Optional Memorial
- 26 June: Saint Pelagius, martyr – Optional Memorial
- 11 July: Saint Benedict, abbot, Patron of Europe – Feast
- 16 July: Our Lady of Mount Carmel – Memorial
- 23 July: Saint Bridget, religious, Patron of Europe – Feast
- 25 July: Saint James, apostle, Patron of Spain – Solemnity
- 9 August: Saint Teresa Benedicta of the Cross, virgin and martyr, Patron of Europe – Feast
- 19 August: Saint Ezequiel Moreno, bishop – Optional Memorial
- 26 August: Saint Teresa of Jesus Jornet e Ibars, virgin – Memorial
- 24 September: Our Lady of Mercy – Optional Memorial
- 3 October: Saint Francis Borgia, priest – Optional Memorial
- 10 October: Saint Thomas of Villanova, bishop – Optional Memorial
- 11 October: Saint Soledad Torres Acosta, virgin – Optional Memorial
- 12 October: Our Lady of the Pillar – Feast
- 15 October: Saint Teresa of Jesus, virgin and Doctor of the Church – Feast
- 19 October: Saint Peter of Alcántara, priest – Optional Memorial
- 24 October: Saint Anthony Mary Claret, bishop – Memorial
- 13 November: Saint Leander, bishop – Optional Memorial
- 10 December: Saint Eulalia of Mérida, virgin and martyr – Optional Memorial
- 14 December: Saint John of the Cross, Doctor of the Church – Memorial
- Thursday after Pentecost: Jesus Christ, the Eternal High Priest – Feast

=== Sri Lanka ===
- 16 January : Saint Joseph Vaz – Feast
- 4 February: Our Lady of Lanka – Solemnity

=== Sudan ===
- 8 February: Saint Josephine Bakhita, virgin – Solemnity
- 10 October: Saint Daniel Comboni, bishop – Solemnity

=== Sweden ===
From the website of the Diocese of Stockholm

- 19 January: Saint Henry, bishop and martyr – Memorial
- 4 February: Blessed Nils Hermansson, bishop – Optional Memorial
- 14 February: Saints Cyril, monk and Methodius, bishop – Feast
- 15 February: Saint Sigfrid, bishop – Optional Memorial
- 29 April: Saint Catherine of Siena, virgin and doctor of the Church – Feast
- 18 May: Saint Eric IX, martyr – Feast
- 21 May: Blessed Hemming of Abo, bishop – Optional Memorial
- 4 June: Saint Elizabeth Hesselblad, religious – Optional Memorial
- 12 June: Saint Eskil, bishop and martyr – Optional Memorial
- 25 June: Saint David of Munktorp, abbot – Optional Memorial
- 10 July: Saint Canute, martyr – Memorial
- 11 July: Saint Benedict, abbot – Feast
- 20 July: Saint Thorlac, bishop – Memorial
- 27 July: Saint Martha – Memorial
- 28 July: Saint Botvid, martyr – Memorial
- 29 July: Saint Olaf II, martyr – Memorial
- 30 July: Saint Helena of Skövde, martyr – Optional Memorial
- 2 August: Saint Catherine of Vadstena, virgin – Optional Memorial
- 9 August: Saint Teresa Benedicta of the Cross (Edith Stein), virgin and martyr – Feast
- 16 August: Saint Brynolf of Skara, bishop – Optional Memorial
- 2 September: Holy Crown of Thorns – Optional Memorial
- 24 September: All Saints of Sweden – Optional Memorial
- 7 October: Saint Brigitta, religious – Solemnity
- 8 October: Our Lady of the Rosary – Memorial
- 9 October: Saint Ingrid of Skänninge, religious – Optional Memorial
- 25 November: Blessed Nicolas Steno, bishop – Optional Memorial
- Thursday after Pentecost: Our Lord Jesus Christ, the Eternal High Priest – Feast

=== Timor-Leste ===
- 10 June: Guardian Angel of Portugal - Memorial
- 20 June: Blessed Sancha and Mafalda, virgins, or Blessed Theresa of Portugal, religious – Optional Memorials
- 18 July: Saint Bartholomew of Braga, bishop - Memorial
- 12 October: Our Lady of Aitara - Feast

=== Trinidad and Tobago ===
- 1 May: Saint Joseph the Worker – Feast
- 26 July: Saints Joachim and Anne, Parents of the Blessed Virgin Mary – Feast
- 4 August: Saint Jean Vianney, priest – Feast
- 1 October: Saint Thérèse of the Child Jesus, virgin and doctor of the Church – Feast
- 12 December: Our Lady of Guadalupe – Feast
- Thursday after Trinity Sunday: The Most Holy Body and Blood of Christ – Solemnity
- Saturday after the Second Sunday after Pentecost: The Immaculate Heart of the Blessed Virgin Mary – Feast

=== Uganda ===
- 3 June: Saints Charles Lwanga and companions, martyrs – Solemnity
- 20 October: Blessed Daudi Okelo and Jildo Irwa, martyrs – Feast

=== Ukraine ===
- 5 January: Blessed Marcelina Darowska, religious – Optional Memorial
- 30 January: Blessed Bronislaw Markiewicz, priest – Optional Memorial
- 14 February: Saints Cyril, Monk and Methodius – Feast
- 1 April: Mary, Mother of Mercy – Optional Memorial
- 29 April: Saint Catherine of Siena – Feast
- 16 May: Saint Andrew Bobola, priest and martyr – Optional Memorial
- 21 May: Saint John Nepomucene, priest and martyr – Optional Memorial
- 17 June: Saint Albert Chmielowski, religious – Optional Memorial
- 26 June: Saint Zygmunt Gorazdowski, priest – Optional Memorial
- 8 July: Saint John of Dukla, priest – Optional Memorial
- 18 July: Saint Hedwig of Poland – Optional Memorial
- 24 July: Saint Olga – Optional Memorial
- 28 July: Saint Vladimir the Great – Memorial
- 11 July: Saint Benedict – Feast
- 23 July: Saint Birgitta – Feast
- 9 August: Saint Teresa Benedicta of the Cross (Edith Stein) – Feast
- 26 August: Our Lady of Częstochowa – Optional Memorial
- 9 September: Blessed Władysław Błądziński, priest and companions, martyrs – Optional Memorial
- 18 September: Saint Stanisław Kostka, religious – Memorial
- 23 October: Saint Józef Bilczewski, bishop – Optional Memorial
- Monday after Pentecost: Mary, Mother of the Church – Feast

=== United Arab Emirates, Oman and Yemen ===
- Second Sunday of Ordinary Time: Our Lady of Arabia - Solemnity
- 25 February: Dedication of the Cathedral - Feast
- 3 December: Saint Francis Xavier, priest - Feast
- 5 November: Commemoration of Deceased Priests and Religious

=== United States ===
According to the national calendar of the United States, as requested by the United States Conference of Catholic Bishops (USCCB) and approved by the Holy See:

- 4 January: Saint Elizabeth Ann Seton, religious – Memorial
- 5 January: Saint John Neumann, bishop – Memorial
- 6 January: Saint André Bessette, religious – Optional Memorial
- 22 January: Day of Prayer for the Legal Protection of Unborn Children (23 Jan when 22 Jan falls on a Sunday)
- 23 January: Saint Vincent, deacon and martyr or Saint Marianne Cope, virgin – Optional Memorials
- 3 March: Saint Katharine Drexel, virgin – Optional Memorial
- 10 May: Saint Damien de Veuster, priest – Optional Memorial
- 15 May: Saint Isidore – Optional Memorial
- 1 July: Saint Junípero Serra, priest – Optional Memorial
- 5 July: Saint Elizabeth of Portugal – Optional Memorial
- 14 July: Saint Kateri Tekakwitha, virgin – Memorial
- 18 July: Saint Camillus de Lellis, priest – Optional Memorial
- 9 September: Saint Peter Claver, priest – Memorial
- 5 October: Blessed Francis Xavier Seelos, priest – Optional Memorial
- 6 October: Blessed Marie-Rose Durocher, virgin – Optional Memorial
- 19 October: Saints John de Brébeuf and Isaac Jogues, priests, and companions, martyrs – Memorial
- 20 October: Saint Paul of the Cross, priest – Optional Memorial
- 13 November: Saint Frances Xavier Cabrini, virgin – Memorial
- 18 November: Saint Rose Philippine Duchesne, virgin – Optional Memorial
- 23 November: Blessed Miguel Agustín Pro, priest and martyr – Optional Memorial
- 12 December: Our Lady of Guadalupe – Feast

=== Uruguay ===
- 19 April: Our Lady of Verdun – Optional Memorial
- 27 April: Saint Turibius of Mogrovejo, bishop – Memorial
- 8 May: Our Lady of Luján – Optional Memorial
- 15 May: Saint Isidore the Laborer – Optional Memorial
- 24 May: Mary, Help of Christians – Optional Memorial
- 16 July: Our Lady of Mount Carmel – Memorial
- 9 August: Blessed Maria Francisca Rubato, virgin – Optional Memorial
- 30 August: Saint Rose of Lima, virgin – Feast
- 10 September: Blessed Dolores Aguiar-Mella y Díaz and Blessed Consuelo Aguiar-Mella y Díaz, companions and martyrs – Optional Memorial
- 24 September: Our Lady of Mercy – Optional Memorial
- 8 November: Our Lady of the Thirty-Three, Patroness of Uruguay – Solemnity
- 17 November: Saints Roque González, Alfonso Rodríguez, and Juan del Castillo, priests and martyrs – Solemnity
- 19 November: Saint Elizabeth of Hungary – Memorial
- 12 December: Our Lady of Guadalupe – Feast
- Thursday after Pentecost: Our Lord Jesus Christ, the Eternal High Priest – Feast

=== Venezuela ===
- 1 February: Blessed Candelaria of San José, religious – Optional Memorial
- 9 February: Saint Miguel Febres Cordero, religious – Optional Memorial
- 11 February: Our Lady of Lourdes – Memorial
- 27 April: Saint Turibius of Mogrovejo, bishop – Memorial
- 3 May: Exaltation of the Holy Cross – Feast
- 4 May: Saints Philip and James, apostles – Feast
- 7 May: Blessed Maria de San José, virgin - Optional Memorial
- 9 May: Saint Carmen Rendiles, virgin - Optional Memorial
- 10 May: Saint John of Avila, priest – Memorial
- 13 May: Our Lady of Fatima – Memorial
- 15 May: Saint Isidore the Farmer – Memorial
- 24 May: Mary, Help of Christians – Memorial
- 26 May: Saint Mariana de Jesús de Paredes, virgin – Optional Memorial
- 13 July: Saint Teresa of Los Andes, virgin – Memorial
- 14 July: Saint Francis Solanus, priest – Memorial
- 16 July: Our Lady of Mount Carmel – Feast
- 26 August: Saint Teresa of Jesus Jornet e Ibars, virgin – Memorial
- 30 August: Saint Rose of Lima, virgin – Feast
- 11 September: Our Lady of Coromoto – Solemnity
- 18 September: Saint John Macias, religious – Memorial
- 24 September: Our Lady of Mercy – Optional Memorial
- 9 October: Saint Louis Bertrand, priest – Optional Memorial
- 26 October: Saint José Gregorio Hernández - Optional Memorial
- 3 November: Saint Martin de Porres, religious – Memorial
- 27 November: Our Lady of the Miraculous Medal – Optional Memorial
- 12 December: Our Lady of Guadalupe – Feast
- Thursday after Pentecost: Our Lord Jesus Christ, the Eternal High Priest – Feast

=== Vietnam ===
- 1 January: Holy Mary, Mother of God – Solemnity
- Sunday after 1 January: Epiphany – Solemnity
- 13 January: Saints Dominic Phạm Trọng Khảm, Luke Phạm Trọng Thìn and Joseph Phạm Trọng Tả, martyrs – Optional Memorial
- 22 January: Saints Matthew Alonzo-Leciniana and Francis Gil Fedrich, priests and martyrs – Optional Memorial
- 30 January: Saint Thomas Ngô Túc Khuông, priest and martyr – Optional Memorial
- 2 February: Saint Jean Théophane Vénard, priest and martyr – Optional Memorial
- 13 February: Saints Paul Lê Văn Lộc and Lawrence Nguyễn Văn Hưởng, priests and martyrs – Optional Memorial
- The Lunar New Year's Eve: Year-end Mass – Lễ Tất Niên (afternoon and evening, Votive Mass) – Memorial
- The Lunar New Year's Eve: New Year's Eve's Mass – Lễ Giao Thừa (night, Votive Masss) – Solemnity
- The first day of the lunar year (Mồng Một Tết): New Year's Mass (Tết Nguyên Đán, Votive Mass) – Solemnity
- The second day of the lunar year (Mồng Hai Tết): Day of Venerating Ancestors (Votive Mass) – Solemnity
- The third day of the lunar year (Mồng Ba Tết): Day of Prayer for Sanctifying Works – Solemnity
- 19 March: Saint Joseph, Principal Patron of Vietnam – Solemnity
- 25 March: Annunciation – Solemnity (when 25 March falls during the Paschal Triduum, it is transferred forward to the first suitable day during Eastertide)
- 1 May: Saint Joseph the Worker – Optional Memorial
- Sunday before Pentecost: Ascension of Jesus – Solemnity
- Sunday before Solemnity of Sacred Heart of Jesus: The Most Holy Body and Blood of Christ – Solemnity
- 26 July: Blessed Andrew of Phú Yên, martyr – Optional Memorial
- 15 August: the Assumption of Mary – Solemnity (holy days of obligation in Ecclesiastical Province of Hanoi)
- 2 September: Vietnam National Day – Optional Memorial
- 5 September: Saint Teresa of Calcutta, virgin – Optional Memorial
- The Mid-Autumn Festival: Day of Prayer for Children (Votive Mass) – Feast
- 1 October: Saint Thérèse of Lisieux – Feast
- First Sunday of October: Our Lady of the Rosary – Solemnity
- 24 November: Saint Andrew Trần An Dũng-Lạc, priest, and companions, martyrs, Secondary Patrons of Vietnam – Solemnity (also celebrated on thirty-third Sunday of Ordinary Time)
- 28 November: Saint Andrew Trần Văn Trông, soldier and martyr – Optional Memorial
- 30 November: Saint Joseph Marchand, priest and martyr – Optional Memorial
- 3 December: Saint Francis Xavier – Feast
- 6 December: Saint Joseph Nguyễn Duy Khang, martyr – Optional Memorial
- 10 December: Saint Simon Phan Đắc Hoà, layman and martyr – Optional Memorial
- 18 December: Saints Paul Nguyễn Văn Mỹ, Peter Trương Văn Đường and Peter Vũ Truật, martyrs – Optional Memorial
- 19 December: Saints Dominic Bùi Văn Úy, cathechist, Francis Hà Trọng Mậu, Thomas Nguyễn Văn Đệ, Augustine Nguyễn Văn Mới and Stephen Nguyễn Văn Vinh, laymen, martyrs – Optional Memorial
- 21 December: Saints Andrew Trần An Dũng-Lạc and Peter Trương Văn Thi, priests and martyrs – Optional Memorial

=== Wales ===
According to the national calendar of Wales, as requested by the Catholic Bishops' Conference of England and Wales and approved by the Holy See:

- 9 February: Saint Teilo, bishop – Optional Memorial
- 14 February: Saints Cyril, monk and Methodius, bishop – Feast
- 1 March: Saint David, bishop – Solemnity
- 20 April: Saint Beuno, abbot – Optional Memorial
- 29 April: Saint Catherine of Siena, virgin and doctor of the Church – Feast
- 5 May: Saint Asaph, bishop – Optional Memorial
- Thursday after Pentecost: Our Lord Jesus Christ, the Eternal High Priest – Feast
- 20 June: Saints Alban, Julius and Aaron, martyrs – Optional Memorial
- 11 July: Saint Benedict, abbot – Feast
- 12 July: Saint John Jones, priest and martyr – Optional Memorial
- 23 July: Saint Birgitta, religious – Feast
- 23 July: Saints Philip Evans and John Lloyd, priests and martyrs – Observed today where it is the Solemnity of Title, else on 25 October.
- 3 August: Saint Germanus of Auxerre, bishop – Optional Memorial
- 9 August: Saint Teresa Benedicta of the Cross (Edith Stein), virgin and martyr – Feast
- 26 August: Saint David Lewis, priest and martyr – Optional Memorial
- 11 September: Saint Deiniol, bishop – Optional Memorial
- 9 October: Saint John Henry Newman, priest and doctor of the Church – Feast
- 16 October: Saint Richard Gwyn, martyr – Optional Memorial
- 25 October: The Six Welsh Martyrs and companions – Feast
- 3 November: Saint Winefride, virgin – Optional Memorial
- 6 November: Saint Illtud, abbot – Optional Memorial
- 8 November: All Saints of Wales – Feast
- 14 November: Saint Dubricius, bishop – Optional Memorial
- 10 December: Saint John Roberts, priest and martyr – Optional Memorial

== See also ==
- General Roman Calendar
- Institutional and societal calendars of the Roman Rite
- Personal jurisdiction calendars of the Roman Rite
