= Joseph Gerard =

Joseph Gerard may refer to:

- Joseph Gérard (1831–1914), French Catholic missionary
- Joe Gerard, a fictional character on the TV series Rhoda
