= Raphaël Rafiringa =

Blessed Raphaël Rafiringa FSC
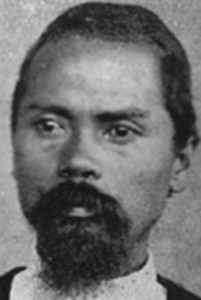
- Born: 3 November 1856; Mahamasina, Antananarivo, Madagascar
- Died: 19 May 1919 (aged 62); Fianarantsoa, Madagascar
- Venerated in: Roman Catholic Church
- Beatified: 7 June 2009, Antsonjombe Outdoor Theatre, Antananarivo, Madagascar by Archbishop Angelo Amato
- Feast: 19 May

Raphaël-Louis Rafiringa, FSC (born Firinga; 3 November 1856 – 19 May 1919) was a Catholic religious brother from Madagascar who served as a De La Salle Brother at a time in his nation when foreign missionaries were expelled. Rafiringa was raised in tribal religion but turned to the Christian faith and was baptized during his adolescence.

Rafiringa was beatified on 7 June 2009; Archbishop Angelo Amato presided on the behalf of Pope Benedict XVI.

== Life ==
Raphaël Rafiringa was born as "Firinga" on 3 November 1856 in Madagascar to Rainiantoandro. His father was a senior official to Queen Ranavalona I and captain of slaves belonging to the caste of Hova. His father lost a child in an earlier marriage. The local sorcerer – Mpisikidy – said to Rafiringa's father on the latter's decision to call his second son Rakotonirina: "Not that name!" and explained that the child would die at 22 months just like the previous son; instead the father said: "We shall call him Firinga". He saw his father on rare instances as a child and would not wear shoes and dressed in a loin cloth alone.

He met missionaries from the De La Salle Brothers in 1866 and after this meeting told his father of his desire to go to school where his teacher was Brother Ladolien. He joined the school on 24 October 1869 when he received his baptism; he asked to join the congregation in 1876. Gonzalvien vested Rafiringa in the habit of the congregation on 11 March 1877.

Rafiringa agreed to serve as an assistant teacher at the local De La Salle school in 1873. On 1 March 1878 he commenced his novitiate and assumed the religious name of "Raphael-Louis" and on 21 November 1879 made his profession as the first native of Madagascar to join. He was elected in 1883 as president of the Catholic Union of nationwide Madagascar and made his perpetual profession on 14 November 1889.

He knelt before Gonzalvien – on 29 May 1883 – and the latter blessed him and instructed him to lead the faithful while the missionaries were expelled in 1883; local Christians made him their guide once the last of the missionaries left. On 3 June 1883 he entered a Protestant-guarded church with Victoire Rasoamanarivo whom he met around that time and collaborated with in religious affairs. General Joseph-Simon Galliéni awarded him the Medal of Civil Merit on 2 May 1903 for his role in facilitating peace between Madagascar and France.

On 24 December 1915 he was arrested and his room was ransacked and manuscripts were confiscated. An inquest started focusing on his writings and officials tried to prove that he was part of the secret V.V.S. sect and took all he owned. Rafiringa was confined to an underground cell with a broken-down table and a covering of wool. Around midnight on Christmas an investigator came to explain the reasons for his arrest and subsequent interrogations and examinations of writings ensured. His trial – on 18 February 1916 – ended in a positive outcome for him and around 8:00pm he was taken back to his home with the faithful lining the streets to receive him and to kiss his hands for those within reach. He travelled to visit the local bishop – on 19 February – to ask for a new rosary since his previous one became worn out.

Ever since his arrest he suffered frequent bouts of fever and his superiors decided to send him to Fianarantsoa in order to recover. On 15 May 1919 he partook in a celebration that honored Jean-Baptiste de La Salle. He died on 19 May 1919 following his final reception of the sacraments. His remains were relocated to his hometown in 1933.

== Beatification ==
The beatification process commenced under Pope John Paul II in Madagascar on 18 June 1994 following the "nihil obstat" ('nothing against') that the Congregation for the Causes of Saints granted to the cause as well as titling the late religious as a Servant of God. The diocesan process spanned from 5 December 1994 until 7 June 1995 and received C.C.S. validation on 20 October 1995.

The official dossier – or Positio – was sent to officials in Rome for evaluation while being passed to a board of historians on 29 January 2002 and to a team of theologians on 24 February 2006 for their approval as well; the C.C.S. granted their assent on 5 December 2007 which allowed for Pope Benedict XVI to recognize his heroic virtue on 17 December 2007 and name him as Venerable.

The process for investigating a miracle in Madagascar took place for a week from 20 September 2004 until the following 26 September; it received C.C.S. validation in Rome on 2 December 2005 and the approval of a medical board on 11 December 2006. Theologians voiced their approval to it on 16 May 2008 while the C.C.S. also approved it on 2 December 2008. The pope approved it on 19 January 2009 and delegated Archbishop Angelo Amato to preside over the beatification on 7 June 2009 in Madagascar's capital.

The current postulator assigned to the cause is Rodolfo Cosimo Meoli.

=== Miracle ===
The miracle involved the cure of Pierre Rafaralahy (1862–1940) in 1927 who became aware of paralysis in his lower body which later that year progressed to total paralysis. He approached the coffin of the late religious – which was left at the altar at a Mass on 10 June 1933 – on crutches and touched it; he experienced a tremor and could suddenly stand without the need of the crutches.
