= Nazaria Ignacia March Mesa =

Spanish religious sister

Saint Nazaria Ignacia March y Mesa

Religious
- Born: 10 January 1889; Madrid, Kingdom of Spain
- Died: 6 July 1943 (aged 54); Buenos Aires, Argentina
- Venerated in: Roman Catholic Church
- Beatified: 27 September 1992, Saint Peter's Square, Vatican City by Pope John Paul II
- Canonized: 14 October 2018, Saint Peter's Square, Vatican City by Pope Francis
- Feast: 6 July
- Attributes: Religious habit
- Patronage: Missionaries of the Crusade

Nazaria Ignacia March Mesa (10 January 1889 – 6 July 1943) – in religion Nazaria of Saint Teresa of Jesus – was a Spanish religious sister and the founder of the Missionaries of the Crusade. Mesa immigrated from Spain to Mexico where she joined a religious order that saw her minister in Bolivia where she remained for most of her life. She served brief stints in Spain to spread the religious order she founded after she left her own order and relocated to Argentina where she later died.

Her beatification cause commenced under Pope Paul VI on 6 September 1966 and she was titled as a Servant of God while Pope John Paul II later confirmed her heroic virtue and named her to be venerable on 1 September 1988; he later beatified her on 27 September 1992 in Saint Peter's Square. Pope Francis confirmed a miracle attributed to her in 2018 and she was canonized on 14 October 2018.

== Life ==
Nazaria Ignacia March Mesa was born in 1889 in Madrid as the fourth of ten children to José Alejandro March Reus (3 April 1850–???) and Nazaria de Mesa Ramos de Peralta (28 July 1853–???). The infant was baptized the month of her birth in the local parish church of Saint Joseph and she later received her First Communion in 1898. In 1898 she heard the voice of Jesus Christ call out to her in which He said to her – "You: Nazaria – follow Me". Her parents were not pleased with her desire to enter the religious life and forbade it while also forbidding her to take the sacraments. Mesa studied in Seville where the Order of Saint Augustine oversaw her education; she resided with her maternal grandmother at this time. She returned home on 9 September 1901 and received her Confirmation in 1902 from the Archbishop of Seville Blessed Marcelo Spinola Maestre. Her grandmother also granted her permission to join the Third Order of Saint Francis and this saw her parents start to relax their religious restrictions on their daughter.

In 1904 her father wanted to move to Mexico but before this happened she and three sisters moved to their grandmother's home so her three sisters could first receive their First Communion before setting off. The Mesa's later relocated to Mexico at the end of 1904 due to tough economic conditions and it was there that she joined the Little Sisters of the Abandoned Elderly on 12 July 1908. She was sent to Oruro in Bolivia and was there tending to the old and ill from 1908 until 1920. But there was the brief suspension of her assignment there for she was sent to do her novitiate back in Spain in 1912 and she did this in Palencia. Mesa assumed the habit on 9 December 1909 as well as the religious name Nazaria of Saint Teresa of Jesus. She made her first vows on 10 October 1911 and returned to Oruro with nine other religious on 23 December 1912. She made her solemn vows on 1 January 1915.

Mesa later met Filippo Cortesi who expressed his desire to found a religious congregation dedicated to re-Christianizing the world and he discussed this when the pair met in Oruro. The two met on 22 June 1924 and that August she fell ill with a high fever. Cortesi met her on 15 August 1924 and gave her an image of the Blessed Virgin Mary as a token of goodwill and because it was the Feast of the Assumption. Mesa recovered and later went to La Paz on 2 December 1925 to hold a further discussion with her friend Cortesi. On 23 March 1925 she attended a celebration in which Cortesi consecrated five new bishops.

Mesa left the order on 16 June 1925 to found a new religious congregation and rallied ten Bolivian women to join her in this effort while Cortesi approved the initial blueprint on 18 August 1925 while later discussing it more with her at length later that same week. This idea came about in 1920 when she attended a spiritual retreat. Mesa founded the Missionaries of the Crusade on 12 December 1926 and it later received diocesan approval on 12 February 1927 while later receiving the decree of praise from Pope Pius XI on 8 June 1935 and papal approval from Pope Pius XII on 9 June 1947 – the latter after her death.

The first general chapter for the order on 1 June 1930 saw the unanimous decision to elect her as the superior general. Mesa later embarked on a pilgrimage to Rome where she met Pope Pius XI in 1934 in a private audience. She told the pope at his feet that she wanted to die for the church but Pius XI told her: "Do not die but live and work for the church". Mesa travelled to Madrid in 1935 where she founded a home for the spiritual exercises to be run but left due to the dangerous and anti-religious Spanish Civil War.

The religious sister arrived in Buenos Aires in Argentina in 1938. Her illness did not prevent her from taking part in the General Chapter held in Buenos Aires in 1943 before her death. She started to suffer from pneumonia on 14 May 1943 and was admitted to the Rivadavia hospital to recuperate – her condition worsened over the next two months before her death.

Mesa died in 1943 due to hemoptysis. Her remains were relocated to Oruro on 18 June 1972. Her order now operates in places such as Portugal and Equatorial Guinea and as of 2005 had 415 religious in a total of 79 houses.

== Canonization ==
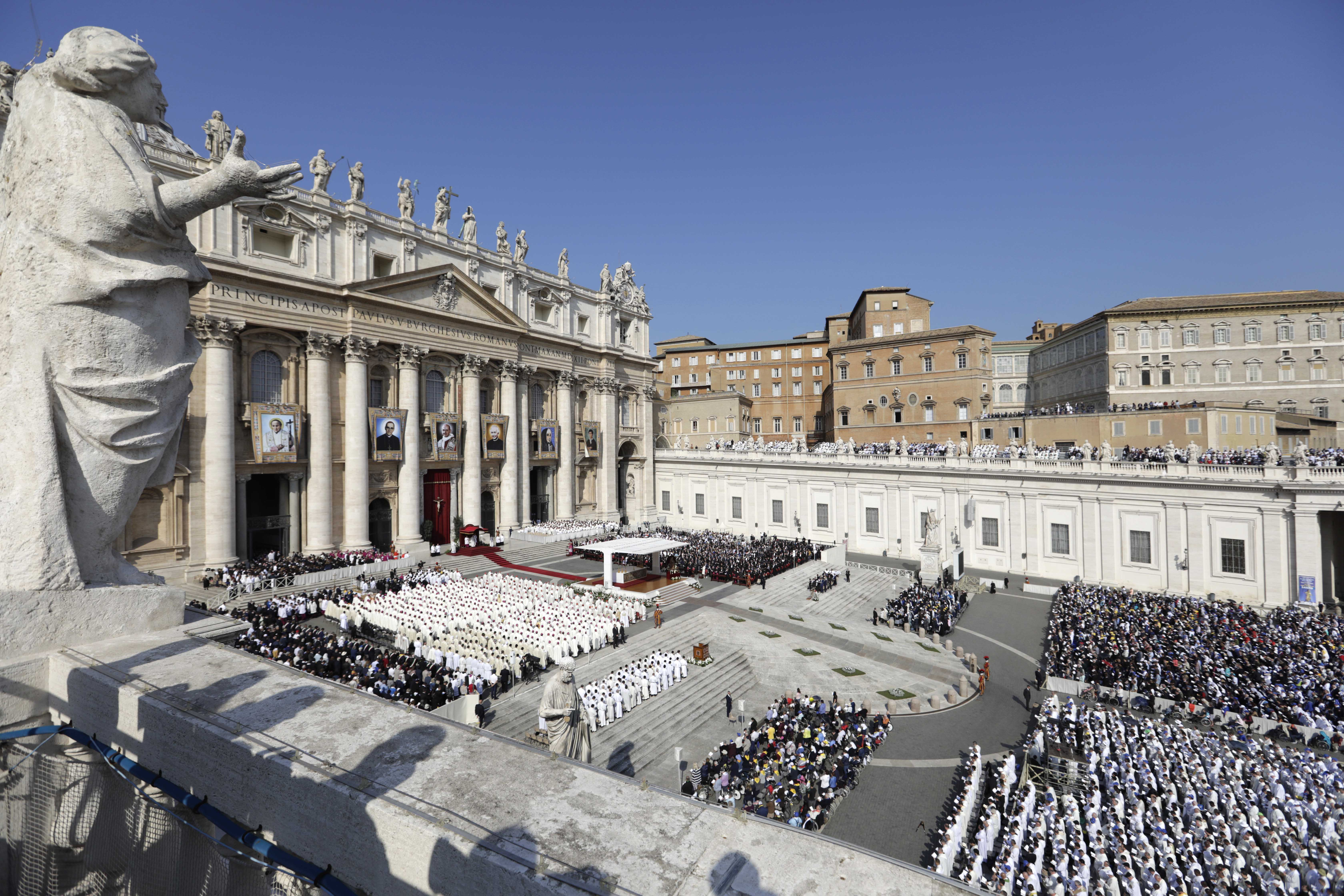
Canonization Mass held in 2018

The beatification cause opened in Buenos Aires in an informative process that Cardinal Antonio Caggiano opened on 6 September 1966 and later closed in a Mass celebrated on 3 December 1973. Mesa became titled as a Servant of God under Pope Paul VI after the cause was launched on 6 September 1966. The Congregation for the Causes of Saints later validated the diocesan process on 20 February 1987, in Rome and received the official Positio dossier from the postulation in 1987.

Theologians provided their assent to the cause on 24 November 1987, as did the members of the Congregation on 12 April 1988. Pope John Paul II approved that Mesa had lived a life of heroic virtue and named her as venerable on 1 September 1988. The miracle needed for beatification was investigated and then validated in Rome on 25 February 1989, while a medical board later met on 3 October 1991, and approved it. Theologians also assented to it on 20 December 1991, as did the Congregation on 21 January 1992. John Paul II approved that the healing was, indeed, a miracle on 7 March 1992, and beatified Mesa in Saint Peter's Square on 27 September 1992.

Medical experts examined and approved a second miracle attributed to the intercession of Mesa on 22 September 2017. Pope Francis confirmed the healing to be a legitimate miracle on 26 January 2018; Mesa's canonization was celebrated in Saint Peter's Square on 14 October 2018.

=== Failed miracle ===
The supposed miracle that could have led to canonization was investigated and then validated on 12 December 2003 though could not proceed further because the medical board disapproved of this in their meeting held on 3 July 2008. The postulation was informed of this failure and so the case was discarded since it was debunked.
