= Miguel Febres Cordero =

Ecuadorian Lassalian Brother, educator, declared a Catholic saint (1854-1910)

Saint Miguel Febres Cordero F.S.C.
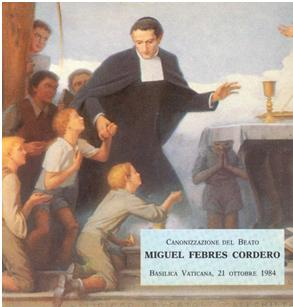

Religious
- Born: 7 November 1854; Cuenca, Azuay, Ecuador
- Died: 9 February 1910 (aged 55); Premià de Mar, Barcelona, Spain
- Resting place: Quito
- Venerated in: Roman Catholic Church
- Beatified: 30 October 1977, Saint Peter's Basilica, Vatican City by Pope Paul VI
- Canonized: 21 October 1984, Saint Peter's Basilica, Vatican City by Pope John Paul II
- Feast: 9 February
- Attributes: Priest's cassock
- Patronage: Brothers of the Christian Schools; Ecuador; Teachers; Writers

Francisco Luis Febres-Cordero y Muñoz (7 November 1854 – 9 February 1910), known as (later Saint) Miguel Febres Cordero and Brother Miguel, was an Ecuadorian Roman Catholic religious brother. He became a professed member of the Brothers of the Christian Schools, colloquially known as the La Salle Brothers. He assumed the name Miguel upon his admittance into the order.

He resided in his native home of Ecuador for almost four decades where he promoted education and evangelization before he relocated to Spain where he continued to perform his duties for his order. He also became a prolific writer and penned various manuals and odes amongst other publications.

Pope Paul VI beatified him on 30 October 1977 and Pope John Paul II canonized him almost a decade later on 21 October 1984 as the first male Ecuadorian saint. He remains a national hero in his native land and his tomb has become a site of pilgrimage. His liturgical feast is celebrated on an annual basis on the date of his death.

== Life ==
Francisco Luis Febres-Cordero y Muñoz was born in Ecuador on 7 November 1854 to Francisco María Febres-Cordero y Montoya and Ana de Jesús Muñoz y Cárdenas. His siblings were Aurelio and Ana.

It was reported that he was born with an infirmity of the feet that rendered him incapable of standing or walking. According to his great-grand-niece, at the age of five he said he had seen a beautiful lady dressed in white; when he went with his aunt to investigate, there was nobody there, but suddenly he could walk for the first time. At the age of eight he was saved from being mauled to death at the hands of a wild bull, attributed to be a miracle at the time. His mother took great care of him and also assumed charge of his education until he was nine. After the death of his mother his father remarried Heloise Santillán, and his half brother Benjamín Febres-Cordero Santillán was born.

In 1863 he was enrolled into a school run by the Brothers of the Christian Schools, newly arrived in the nation. He was selected to give the welcome address when President Gabriel García Moreno visited the school.

Muñoz became the first Ecuadorian member of the Brothers of the Christian Schools on 24 March 1868. He assumed the religious habit on the eve of the Feast of the Annunciation with the name of "Miguel", despite the opposition of his father and grandmother. He held the position of a school teacher in Quito for over three decades, becoming known as a gentle and dedicated individual. He published his own school textbooks, including one for the teaching of Spanish, as well as odes and discourses on teaching methods. The government adopted some of his textbooks and circulated them to all schools. He also did research and wrote books on literature and linguistics, which earned him membership in the Ecuadorian Academy of Letters in 1892, followed by the Academies of Spain, France, and Venezuela. Due to his high standing in educational affairs he was elected to educational academies in Ecuador in 1892, and in France and Venezuela. He conducted religious retreats and helped to prepare children for their First Communion. He served as the novice director for his order's house from 1901 to 1904.

In 1888 he was sent as the representative to the celebration in which Pope Leo XIII beatified the order's founder, John Baptist de la Salle. Muñoz was sent to Europe in 1905 to translate texts from French to Spanish for the order to use, and he worked to that extent in Belgium. His health started to deteriorate in 1908, and he was transferred to Barcelona in Spain, where he continued to work as long as his health allowed him to. Strikes broke out and churches were burned, which led to the evacuation of the order, but despite this he managed to make a pilgrimage to Zaragoza.

He died in 1910 of pneumonia and was buried in Premià de Mar, Spain. He was exhumed during the Spanish Civil War and was found to be incorrupt. In 1937 his remains were transferred to Quito where his tomb became a popular pilgrimage site.

== Sainthood ==
Olga Murillo, great-grand-niece of Cordero, gave details regarding events accepted as miracles required for canonization.

=== Beginning ===
His sanctification commenced with local processes in Barcelona from 1923 to 1924 and, and Quito from 1938 to 1943, although the cause was not formally introduced until 13 November 1935 under Pope Pius XI, granting him the posthumous title of Servant of God. Both processes received formal ratification decrees in 1952 for the cause to proceed to the next stage.

He was proclaimed to be Venerable on 16 March 1970 after Pope Paul VI recognized his life of heroic virtue.

=== Beatification ===
The miracle required for beatification was the deemed healing of sister Clementina Flores Cordero in 1933. She was seriously ill with a liver disease, and was visited by La Salle brothers, who prayed to brother Miguel to cure her. The next day, when it was time for her morphine injection she was able to walk out unaided. This was investigated in a diocesan tribunal that gathered all documentation from 1939 until 1941. The process received formal ratification on 30 April 1971 and was sent to the Congregation for the Causes of Saints in Rome for further evaluation. Paul VI approved the miracle and beatified him on 30 October 1977.

=== Canonization ===
The second miracle needed for sainthood was what was considered to be the curing of Beatriz Gómez de Núñez of incurable myasthenia gravis when she attended Cordero's beatification ceremony in St Peter's Square, Rome; she suddenly felt no more pain. This was also investigated in a local tribunal and was ratified in 1983. Pope John Paul II approved it, and Cordero was canonized on 21 October 1984.
