= Joseph Gérard =

French Catholic missionary (1831–1914)

Blessed Joseph Gérard O.M.I.
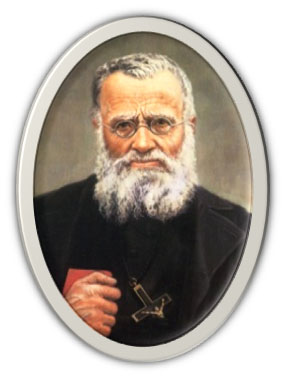
- Born: 12 March 1831; Bouxières-aux-Chênes, Meurthe-et-Moselle, July Monarchy
- Died: 29 May 1914 (aged 83); Roma, Maseru, Lesotho
- Venerated in: Roman Catholic Church
- Beatified: 15 September 1988, Maseru, Lesotho by Pope John Paul II
- Feast: 29 May
- Attributes: Priest's attire
- Patronage: Missionaries

Joseph Gérard, OMI (12 March 1831 – 29 May 1914) was a French Catholic priest and a professed member from the Missionary Oblates of Mary Immaculate; he worked in the missions among the Basotho people in Lesotho and the Free State province of South Africa. His works in the mission are now attributed to a partial degree to a boom in Catholicism in Lesotho, where he was well-known and regarded for his extensive work; he was even working up until a month prior to his own death just before World War I.

His beatification was celebrated in Lesotho on 15 September 1988.

== Life ==
Joseph Gérard was born in Bouxières-aux-Chênes on 12 March 1831 as the eldest of five children to Jean Gérard and Ursule Stofflet. He spent his childhood on his farm and had a religious upbringing. He made his First Communion on 2 February 1842 and received his Confirmation on 24 March 1844.

He received his religious education from the Missionary Oblates of Mary Immaculate and he later joined their order on 9 May 1851 when he commenced his period of the novitiate. He studied in the minor seminary of Pont-à-Mousson from October 1844 before moving to Nancy for his theological studies. He was there from October 1849 until later pursuing it in Marseille from mid-1852; he then completed them while in South Africa. He was not a gifted academic but rather was quick and adept at learning languages which would help him in learning the Zulu and Sesotho languages that he used for his active work in the missions. Gérard moved to South Africa in 1853 and never returned to his native France. He made his perpetual vows on 10 May 1852.

The order's founder Eugène de Mazenod elevated him to the diaconate and on 3 April 1853 assigned him to Natal in South Africa in 1853; he set off not long after on 10 May after bidding farewell to his family the previous day. He arrived in Natal on 21 January 1854. Gérard was ordained to the priesthood at Pietermaritzburg on 19 February 1854 and received ordination from Bishop Allard. He began his work among the Zulus in the Natal vicariate but met with little progress there.

In January 1862 he joined Bishop Marie-Jean-François Allard in starting the first Catholic mission in Lesotho since there had existed a Protestant congregation that the a French movement founded. Gérard approached and received permission from the Basotho King Moshoeshoe I and so helped found the "Motse-oa-'M'a-Jesu" ("Village of the Mother of Jesus") mission around 32 kilometers (20 mi) south of Thaba Bosiu now at the present Roma. Moshoeshoe held Gérard in great esteem and respect for remaining in the nation during the Free State–Basotho War and it has been said that it was at Gérard's encouragement that the chief sought British intervention at the end of the conflict. Moshoeshoe also allowed for the Christian authorities to consecrate Lesotho to the Blessed Virgin Mary on 15 August 1865. But Gérard's work still progressed at a slow pace: at the end of 1879 there were 700 Catholics in the nation.

In 1875, he founded the Saint Monica mission in the Leribe District in northern Lesotho. From there he served the Basotho of Lesotho and also all those who lived in the neighboring Orange Free State. He returned to the Roma congregation in 1898 where he continued his work for the remainder of his life.

He died in mid-1914 after suffering from ill health for at least a month prior to his death.

== Beatification ==
Gérard's spiritual writings were approved by theologians on 25 July 1952. The beatification process commenced under Pope Pius XII on 1 March 1955 and he became titled as a Servant of God while the confirmation of his life of heroic virtue allowed for Pope Paul VI to name him as Venerable on 13 November 1976. The miracle required for his beatification was investigated and later received validation from the Congregation for the Causes of Saints on 14 March 1986; a medical board approved it on 3 December 1986 as did theologians on 13 March 1987 and the C.C.S. members on 19 May 1987. Pope John Paul II approved this miracle on 1 June 1987 and beatified the late priest while on his visit to Lesotho on 15 September 1988.

The current postulator for this cause is the O.M.I. priest Thomas Klosterkamp.
