= Feast of Christ the Priest =

Roman Catholic moveable liturgical feast

- Observed by: Catholic Church (see countries and institutes observing the feast.)
- Liturgical color: White
- Observances: Holy Mass
- Date: First Thursday after Pentecost
- 2025 date: June 12
- 2026 date: May 28
- 2027 date: May 20
- 2028 date: June 8
- Frequency: Annual

The Feast of Christ the Priest, also known as the Feast of Our Lord Jesus Christ, The Eternal High Priest, is a Roman Catholic moveable liturgical feast celebrated annually on the first Thursday after Pentecost. Approval for this feast was first granted by the Congregation for Divine Worship and the Discipline of the Sacraments in 1987. In 2012 the Congregation sent a letter to all conferences of bishops, offering the feast to be inscribed in their respective liturgical calendars if they ask for it.

== Countries and institutes observing the feast ==
- Confraternity of Christ the Priest in Australia
- Spain
- Chile
- Mexico
- Poland (since 2013; Decree, 3 April 2013)
- Slovakia (since 2013)
- Netherlands (since 2014)
- Czech Republic (since 2015)
- England and Wales (since 2018)
- Pampanga, Philippines (since 2001)
- Community of Saint Martin (since 2020)

== Significance ==
The feast focuses firstly on Jesus’ Priestly Office (Latin: Munus sacerdotale). He is considered the model for believers, and for the clergy in particular, with priests acting In persona Christi (“In the person of Christ”). The laity are thus urged to pray that priests would be more like Christ, the compassionate and trustworthy high priest (Hebrews 2:17), ever-living to intercede for humanity before The Father (Heb 7:25).

The Second Vatican Council taught many things about the Priesthood of Christ, and sharing in that one Priesthood through the Sacraments of Baptism and Holy Orders. This development has been reflected in many subsequent documents. One effective way to build upon this teaching is to establish the Feast of Christ the Priest more widely.

What Pope Pius XI wrote about the feast in honor of Christ’s Kingly Office can be said just as truly about this feast in honor of Christ's Priesthood:

For people are instructed in the truths of faith, and brought to appreciate the inner joys of religion far more effectually by the annual celebration of our sacred mysteries than by any official pronouncement of the teaching of the Church. Such pronouncements usually reach only a few and the more learned among the faithful; feasts reach them all; the former speak but once, the latter speak every year - in fact, forever.

== Liturgical aspects ==
The feast has its own proper texts for the Mass, as for the Votive Mass of the Blessed Eucharist B.

The feast also has approved Latin, Spanish and English texts for the Liturgy of the Hours. The formulary lacks proper texts for the extended vigil (per IGLH 73). This rules out entirely the celebration of the extended vigil since, unlike other feasts, feasts of the Lord cannot draw on Common of the Saints.

The entry from the Roman Martyrology (2005) reads:

Thursday after Pentecost

The Feast of Our Lord Jesus Christ, The Eternal High Priest, according to the order of Melchizedek.

In him the Father has been well pleased from before all time. As Mediator between God and human beings, fulfilling his Father’s will, he sacrificed himself once on the altar of the Cross as a saving Victim for the whole world. Thus, instituting the pattern of an everlasting sacrifice, with a brother’s kindness he chose, from among the children of Adam, men to augment the priesthood, so that, from the sacrifice continually renewed in the Church, streams of divine power might flow, whereby a new heaven and a new earth might be made, and throughout the whole universe there would be perfected what no eye has seen, nor ear heard, nor has entered into the human heart.
