= Bouxières-aux-Chênes =

- Commune
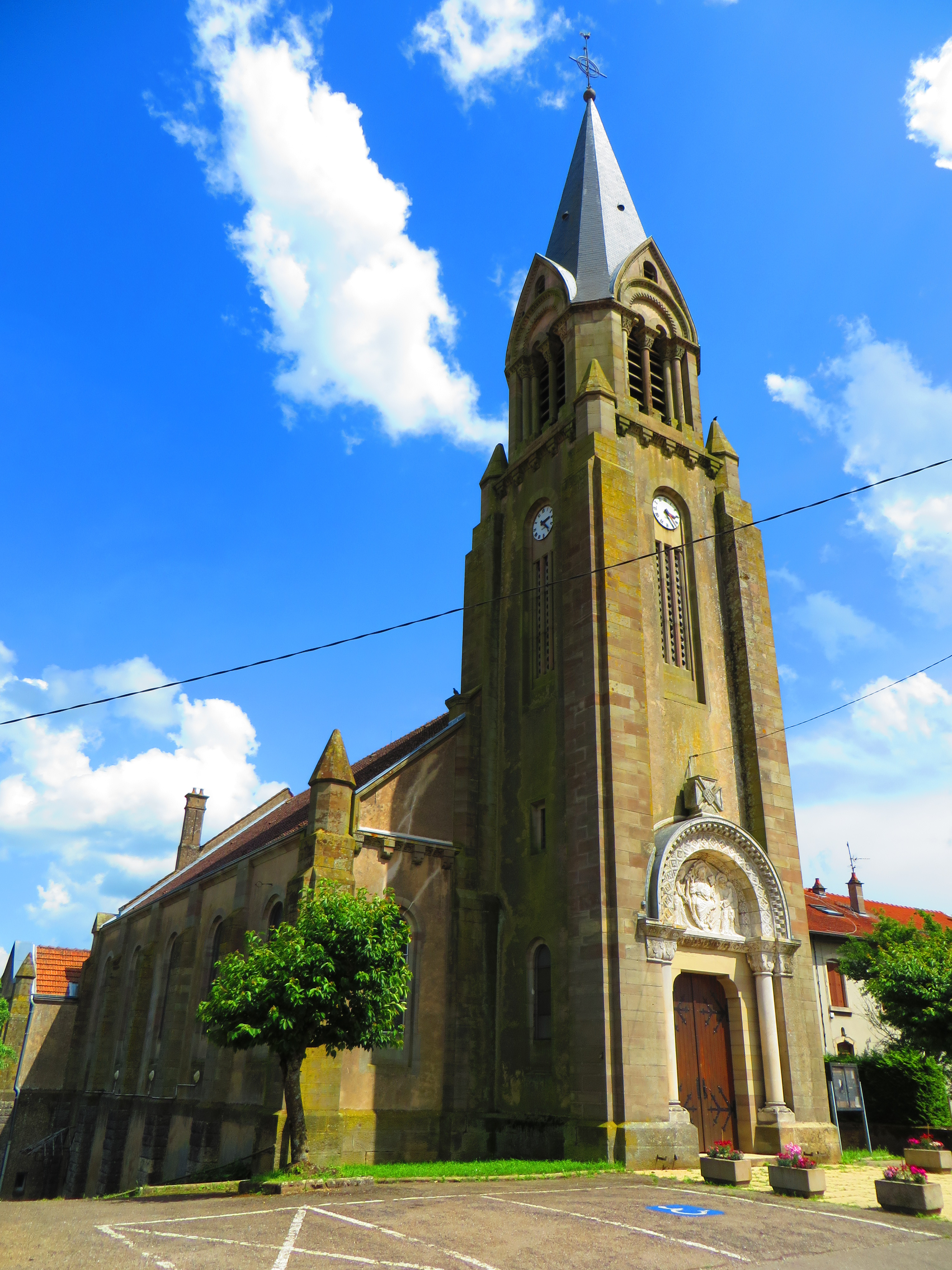
- The church in Bouxières-aux-Chênes

- Coat of arms
- Location of Bouxières-aux-Chênes
- Location within France Location within Grand Est
- Coordinates: 48°46′22″N 6°15′40″E
- Country: France
- Region: Grand Est
- Department: Meurthe-et-Moselle
- Arrondissement: Nancy
- Canton: Grand Couronné
- Intercommunality: Seille et Grand Couronné

Government
  - Mayor (2020–2026): Philippe Voinson
- Area^{1}: 19.85 km^{2} (7.66 sq mi)
- Elevation: 290 m (950 ft)
- Highest elevation: 408 m (1,339 ft)
- Lowest elevation: 212 m (696 ft)
- Population (2023): 1,415
  - Density: 71.28/km^{2} (184.6/sq mi)
- Time zone: UTC+01:00 (CET)
  - Summer (DST): UTC+02:00 (CEST)
- INSEE/Postal code: 54089 /54770
- ^{1} French Land Register data, which excludes lakes, ponds, glaciers > 1 km^{2} (0.386 sq mi or 247 acres) and river estuaries.

Bouxières-aux-Chênes (French pronunciation: [buksjɛʁ o ʃɛːn]) is a commune in the Meurthe-et-Moselle department in northeastern France.

The commune covers an area of 19.85 km^{2} (7.66 sq mi). Philippe Voinson is the mayor for the 2020-2026 tenure.

== Population ==
Historical population
Year	Pop.	±% p.a.
1968	780	—
1975	1,002	+3.64%
1982	1,293	+3.71%
1990	1,284	−0.09%
1999	1,312	+0.24%
2007	1,382	+0.65%
2012	1,424	+0.60%
2017	1,422	−0.03%
2023	1,415	−0.08%
Source: INSEE

== See also ==
- Communes of the Meurthe-et-Moselle department
