= Victoire Rasoamanarivo =

Laywoman from Madagascar beatified by John Paul II

Blessed Victoire Rasoamanarivo
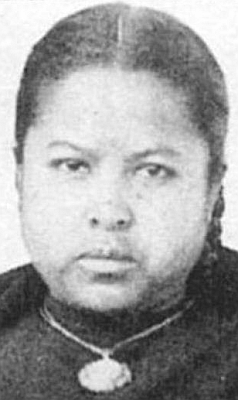

Laywoman
- Born: 1848; Antananarivo, Madagascar
- Died: 21 August 1894 (aged 46); Antananarivo, Madagascar
- Venerated in: Roman Catholic Church
- Beatified: 30 April 1989, Saint Peter's Square, Vatican City by Pope John Paul II
- Feast: 21 August
- Attributes: Rosary

Victoire Rasoamanarivo (1848 – 21 August 1894) was a Catholic woman from Madagascar who devoted her life to the poor and the sick. She looked after their needs and spent her free time in prayer.

She was beatified in 1989 after a miracle was attributed to her intercession and her sainthood cause still continues. Another miracle is needed before she can be canonized.

== Biography ==
Rasoamanarivo was born in 1848 as the daughter of Rainiandriantsilavo and Rambahinoro. Her paternal uncle served as an officer and raised her himself. She started to attend lessons at a Catholic school at the age of thirteen and was drawn to the faith.

She converted to Roman Catholicism and was baptized on 1 November 1863. After this she took the name of Victoire. Her parents were hostile to this and put her in a Protestant school. Her parents threatened to disown her if she continued to follow the Catholic faith but she refused.

Despite the fact that she felt drawn to religious life her parents arranged a marriage to Ratsimatahodriaka. The latter was a cousin and the two wed on 13 May 1864. Ratsimatahodriaka was a violent and womanizing drunkard. Her friends continually urged her to divorce him but she refused to do so and stated that marriage was a sacred sacrament that could never be broken. Every day, she continually prayed for her husband's conversion.

The political situation in the nation altered dramatically in 1883, and Catholic gatherings were outlawed as were churches and other institutions. But some, including Victoire, ignored this and continued to live the faith in a peaceful manner. She helped to lead the movement until peace was restored in 1885.

Her husband died on 14 March 1888 asking for forgiveness and being baptized prior to his death. After this, she spent the rest of her years caring for the poor, sick and imprisoned and devoted herself wholly to prayer. She died peacefully on 21 August 1894. Her tomb is located inside the Andohalo Cathedral's chapel.

== Beatification ==
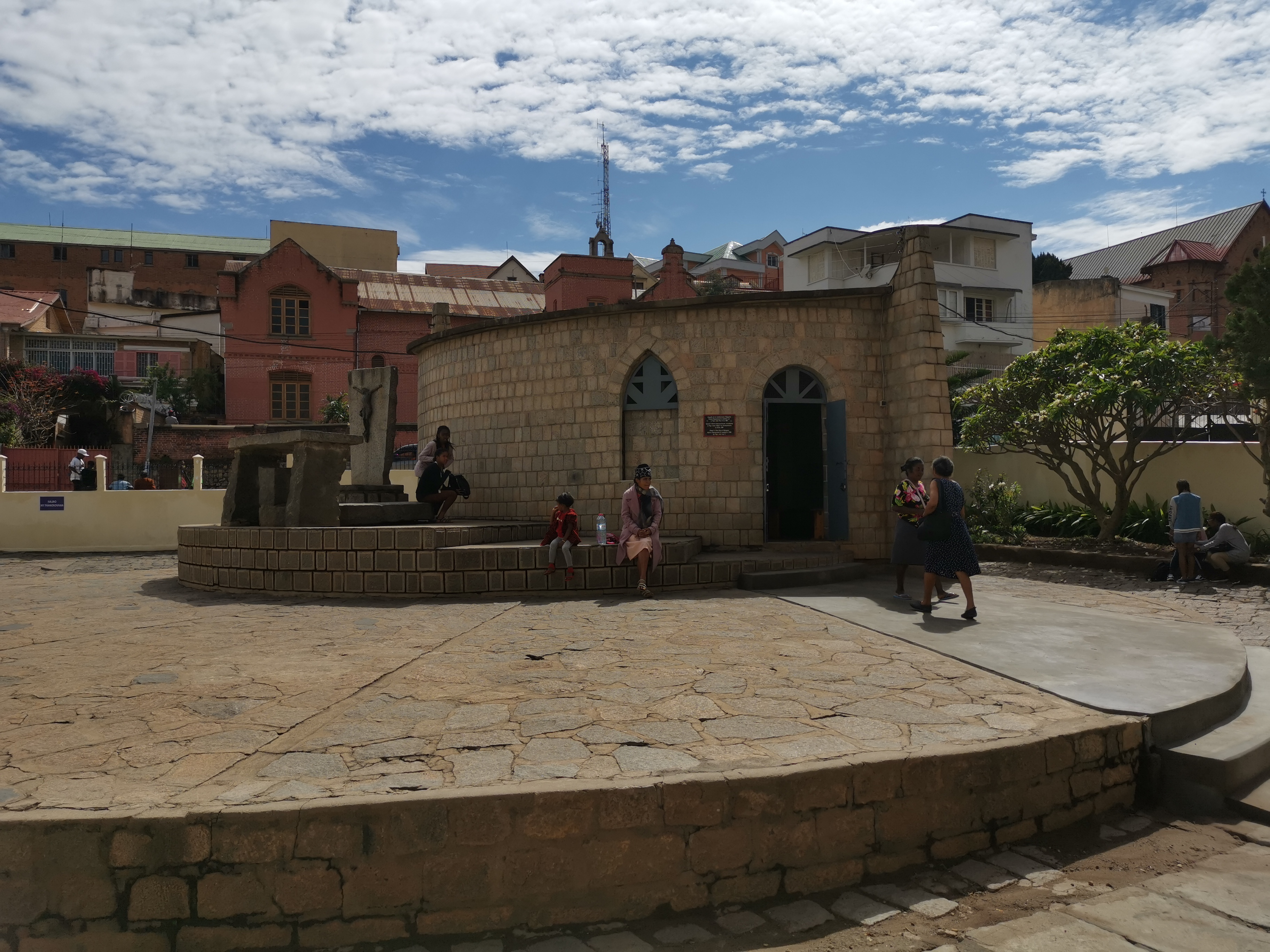
Chapel

Preliminary local investigations began on 8 June 1935. The cause for beatification started on 19 February 1956, which allowed for her to be made a Servant of God. Pope John Paul II declared her to have lived a life of heroic virtue and proclaimed her to be Venerable. He also approved a miracle attributed to her intercession on 9 May 1985, paving the way for her to be beatified on 30 April 1989.

Another miracle was investigated and led to the validation on 25 November 2005. The medical board of the Congregation for the Causes of Saints approved the miracle on 9 October 2008, and it must pass two more hurdles before papal approval.
