= Enrique Angelelli =

Catholic bishop (1923–1976)

Blessed Enrique Angelelli
- Bishop of La Rioja
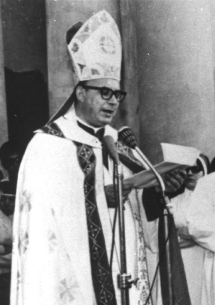
- Angelelli at Mass.
- Church: Roman Catholic Church
- Diocese: La Rioja
- See: La Rioja
- Appointed: 3 July 1968
- Installed: 24 August 1968
- Predecessor: Horacio Arturo Gómez Dávila
- Successor: Bernardo Enrique Witte
- Previous posts: Auxiliary Bishop of Córdoba (1960–1968); Titular Bishop of Lystra (1960–1968)

Orders
- Ordination: 9 October 1949
- Consecration: 12 March 1961 by Ramón José Castellano
- Rank: Bishop

Personal details
- Born: Enrique Ángel Angelelli; 18 July 1923 Córdoba, Argentina
- Died: 4 August 1976 (aged 53) Sañogasta, Chilecito, La Rioja, Argentina
- Motto: Para que todos sean uno ("So that all may be one")

Sainthood
- Feast day: 17 July
- Venerated in: Roman Catholic Church
- Beatified: 27 April 2019; La Rioja, Argentina by Cardinal Giovanni Angelo Becciu
- Attributes: Bishop's attire

Enrique Ángel Angelelli Carletti (17 July 1923 – 4 August 1976) was a bishop of the Catholic Church in Argentina who was assassinated during the Dirty War for his involvement with social issues. Angelelli commitment to the "Church of the Poor" offered a model for the future Pope Francis.

His cause of sainthood opened in 2015. In June 2018 Pope Francis decreed he had died as a martyr for the faith, allowing Angelelli and his companions to be beatified. The beatification of Angelelli and his three companions was celebrated at La Rioja City Park in La Rioja on 27 April 2019.

== Life ==
=== Early life ===
Enrique Angelelli was born to Juan Angelelli and Celina Carletti, two Italian immigrants and devout Catholics, in Córdoba, in 1926. At 15 years old, Angelelli entered the Seminary of Our Lady of Loretto, where he would study humanities and philosophy for the next nine years. In 1947, he travelled to Rome to finish his priestly studies at the Pontifical Pius Latin America College. After being ordained a priest on 9 October 1949, he continued his schooling to attain a degree in Canon law at the Pontifical Gregorian University.

=== Priesthood ===
Angelelli returned to Córdoba in 1951, when he was appointed cooperating vicar of the San José Parish. He took a role as an advisor to the Catholic Workers Youth (JOC), which ran out of the Cristo Obrero Chapel.

On 12 December 1960, Pope John XXIII appointed Angelelli as the auxiliary Bishop of the Archdiocese of Cordoba (Argentina) and the titular Bishop of the Lystra. Fourteen days later, on 26 December, he was named the vicar general. He took over as Archdeacon of the venerable ecclesiastical chapter of the Cathedral Church on 16 February 1961, and was consecrated on 12 March 1961. As the auxiliary bishop, Angelelli became increasingly involved in the involvement and coordination of labor unions. Throughout 1963, after having assisted those in slums for the previous twelve years, Angelelli began calling for campaigns to help those in poverty stricken areas. This increase in political action led to the arrest of Angelelli. The newly appointed Archbishop of Córdoba, Raúl Primatesta, relieved him of his duties for part of 1965, exiling him to Colegio Villa Eucharistica as chaplain in the convent of the Adoratrices. He took part in the first, third, and fourth sessions of the Second Vatican Council in 1962, 1964, and 1965.

=== La Rioja ===
On 11 July 1968, Pope Paul VI appointed Angelelli as the bishop of the Diocese of La Rioja, in northwest Argentina, becoming the third person to ever hold the title. He officially took office for the role on 24 August 1968, the same day of the Second Episcopal Conference of Latin America in Medellín.

Angelelli supplied displayed support of the May 1968 first Encounter of the Movement of Priests for the Third World, though he never joined the movement himself.

In La Rioja, Angelelli encouraged miners, rural workers and domestic workers to form unions, as well as cooperatives to manufacture knitting works, bricks, clocks and bread, and to claim and work idle lands. One of these co-operatives asked for the expropriation of a latifundio (large estate) that had grown through the appropriation of smaller estates whose owners could not pay their debts. Governor Carlos Menem promised he would deliver the estate to the co-operative.

On 13 June 1973, Angelelli went to Anillaco, Menem's birth town, to preside over the patronal feasts. He was met by a mob led by merchants and landowners, among them Amado Menem, the governor's brother, and his sons César and Manuel. The mob entered the church by force. When Angelelli suspended the celebrations and left, they threw stones at him. Governor Menem withdrew his support for the co-operative citing "social unrest". Angelelli denounced conservative groups, called off religious celebrations in the diocese, and declared a temporary interdict against the Menems and their supporters.

The Superior General of the Jesuits, Pedro Arrupe, and the Archbishop of Santa Fe, Vicente Faustino Zazpe, sent by the Holy See as an overseer, visited La Rioja in 1973 and supported Angelelli, who had offered his resignation and asked the Pope to ratify his actions or withdraw his trust. Before Zazpe, the interdicted demanded Angelelli's removal, while military marches were broadcast through a loudspeaker. Almost all priests of the diocese met with Zazpe to support Angelelli and his involvement in labor politics.

On the other hand, the president of the Argentine Episcopal Conference, Adolfo Tortolo [de], said that the Conference should not mediate, and Papal Nuncio Lino Zanini openly supported the interdicted, to whom he gave crucifixes as gifts.

Zazpe concluded his inspection by co-celebrating Mass with Angelelli and expressing his full support for his pastoral work and doctrinal orthodoxy.

=== The Dirty War ===
The end of the brief presidency of Isabel Perón in Argentina (1974–76) brought with it the beginning of an eight year military dictatorship, in the form of a three man junta, and the Dirty War. The military closed the National Congress, banned all trade unions, and took control of the municipal government. 1976, the Argentine Military launched a campaign called Proceso de Reorganizacion ("National Reorganization Process") in which it used bombings, kidnappings, torture and assassinations, to persecute those holding left-wing views.

On 12 February 1976, the vicar of the diocese of La Rioja and two members of a social activist movement were arrested by the military, despite the military claiming to have seized power in order to protect Christianity. On 24 March, a coup d'état ousted Isabel Perón and all the nation's governors, including Carlos Menem of La Rioja (whom Angelleli had served as confessor). Angelleli petitioned General Osvaldo Pérez Battaglia, the new military interventor of La Rioja, for information on the vicar's and the activists' whereabouts. Getting no response, he travelled to Córdoba to speak to Luciano Benjamín Menéndez, then Commander of the Third Army Corps. Menéndez threatened and warned Angelelli: "It is you who have to be careful."

=== Murder ===
On a visit to Rome in 1974, Angelelli was advised not to return to Argentina, due to his presence creating a risk. He did not see remaining in Rome as an option. Angelelli allegedly knew that he was being targeted for assassination by the military; people close to him had often heard him say, "It's my turn next." On 4 August 1976 Angelelli was driving a truck with Father Arturo Pinto back from a Mass celebrated in the town of El Chamical, in homage to two murdered priests, Carlos de Dios Murias and Gabriel Longueville, carrying three folders with notes about both cases. He was reportedly looking into those two priests, who were murdered on 18 July 1976.

According to Father Pinto, a car started following them, then another one, and in Punta de los Llanos, people forced the truck between them until toppling it. After being unconscious for a while, Pinto saw Angelelli dead in the road, with the back of his neck showing grave injuries. The area was quickly surrounded by police and military personnel. An ambulance was called for. Angelelli's body was taken to the city of La Rioja. The autopsy revealed several broken ribs and a star-shaped fracture in the occipital bone, consistent with a blow given using a blunt object. The truck's brakes and steering wheel were intact, and there were no bullet marks.

The police report claimed that Pinto had been driving, momentarily lost control of the vehicle, and when trying to get back on the road a tire blew out; Angelelli was said to have been killed as the truck turned several times. This was accepted by judges at the time.

On 19 June 1986, with Argentina under democratic rule again, La Rioja judge Aldo Morales ruled that it had been a premeditated homicide. When some military personnel became involved in the accusation, the Armed Forces tried to block the investigation, but the judge rejected their claims. The case passed to the Supreme Court of Argentina, which in turn sent it to the Federal Chamber of Córdoba.

In the month of April 1990, the Ley de Punto Final ("Full Stop Law") ended the investigation against the three military accused of the murder (José Carlos González, Luis Manzanelli and Ricardo Román Oscar Otero). This law and the Law of Due Obedience were repealed in 2005, and in August of that year the case was re-opened. The Supreme Court split the case in two: the accusation against the military was sent to the tribunals in Córdoba, and the possible participation of civilians in the murder was sent to La Rioja. Former Commander Menéndez was called on by the La Rioja tribunal on 16 May 2006 but made no statement. On 5 July 2014, Menéndez and Luis Estrella, who had headed the Air Force base and torture center at El Chamical, were sentenced to life for Angelelli's murder.

== Position of the Church ==
After the murder of Angelelli, the Catholic Church officially accepted the car accident story, but some of its members spoke against it. L'Osservatore Romano reported his death as an accident. Cardinal Juan Carlos Aramburu, Archbishop of Buenos Aires, denied it was a crime, as he was often in support of the military dictatorship, and ignored their crimes.

== Homages to Angelelli ==
In February 1986, U.S. Senator Edward M. Kennedy, during a journey to South America to highlight human rights, paid homage to Angelelli at the La Rioja Cathedral. In 1993, Martin Edwin Andersen, the former Newsweek and Washington Post special correspondent in Buenos Aires who travelled with Kennedy to La Rioja, dedicated his investigative history, "Dossier Secreto: Argentina's Desaparecidos and the Myth of the Dirty 'War,'" to Angelelli, and to human rights heroes Patricia Derian, who spearheaded the U.S. human rights revolution of President Jimmy Carter, and Emilio Mignone, the founder of the Centro de Estudios Legales y Sociales (CELS), "three people who spoke out and made a difference."

On 2 August 2006, two days before the 30th anniversary of Angelelli's death, President Néstor Kirchner signed a decree declaring 4 August a national day of mourning, and gave a speech in the Casa Rosada "commemorating the religious workers [who were] victims of state terrorism". Alba Lanzillotto, a member of the Grandmothers of the Plaza de Mayo who used to attend mass sung by bishop Angelelli, spoke then regarding the belated homage of the Catholic hierarchy: "I don't want Monsignor to be made into a stamp. He has to be alive in our memory."

On the day of the anniversary, Jorge Bergoglio, Archbishop of Buenos Aires (later Pope Francis), celebrated Mass in the Cathedral of La Rioja in memory of Angelelli. In his homily he said that Angelelli "got stones thrown at him because he preached the Gospel, and shed his blood for it". Bergoglio also quoted Tertullian's sentence "thé blood of the martyrs is the seed of the Church". This was the first official homage of the Church to Angelelli, and the first time that the word martyr was used with reference to his murder by Church authorities in this context.

After the Mass, about 2,000 people, including the governor of La Rioja Ángel Maza, paid homage to Angelelli in Punta de los Llanos, the site of his death.

Two plaques, that bare Angelelli's name, were revealed in the Casa de La Rioja on 19 August 2007 in his honor.

On 27 April 2019, shortly before his beatification, Congregation for the Causes of Saints Prefect Cardinal Angelo Becciu compared Angelelli to assassinated Catholic saint Oscar Romero and even labelled Angelelli as "Argentina's Romero."

== Beatification ==
Pope Francis voiced support for the cause of sainthood for Angelelli which commenced on 21 April 2015 with the formal declaration of "nihil obstat" (nothing against) to the cause. He was bestowed the title of Servant of God as a result. The official diocesan process commenced on 13 October 2015. On 8 June 2018 Francis approved the decree that Angelelli and three others murdered in La Rioja at the time–Carlos Murias, Gabriel Longueville, Wenceslao Pedernera–were martyred out of hatred for the faith and called the Bishop of Rioja, Marcelo Colombo with the news. The beatification ceremony then took place on 27 April 2019 and Cardinal Giovanni Angelo Becciu presided over the celebration, which took place at La Rioja City Park in La Rioja, on the Pope's behalf.

== See also ==
- Roman Catholicism in Argentina
