= Martyrs of La Rioja =

Two priests and a married man who were killed in the La Rioja province in Argentina

Blessed Carlos de Dios Murias OFM Conv.
- Martyr
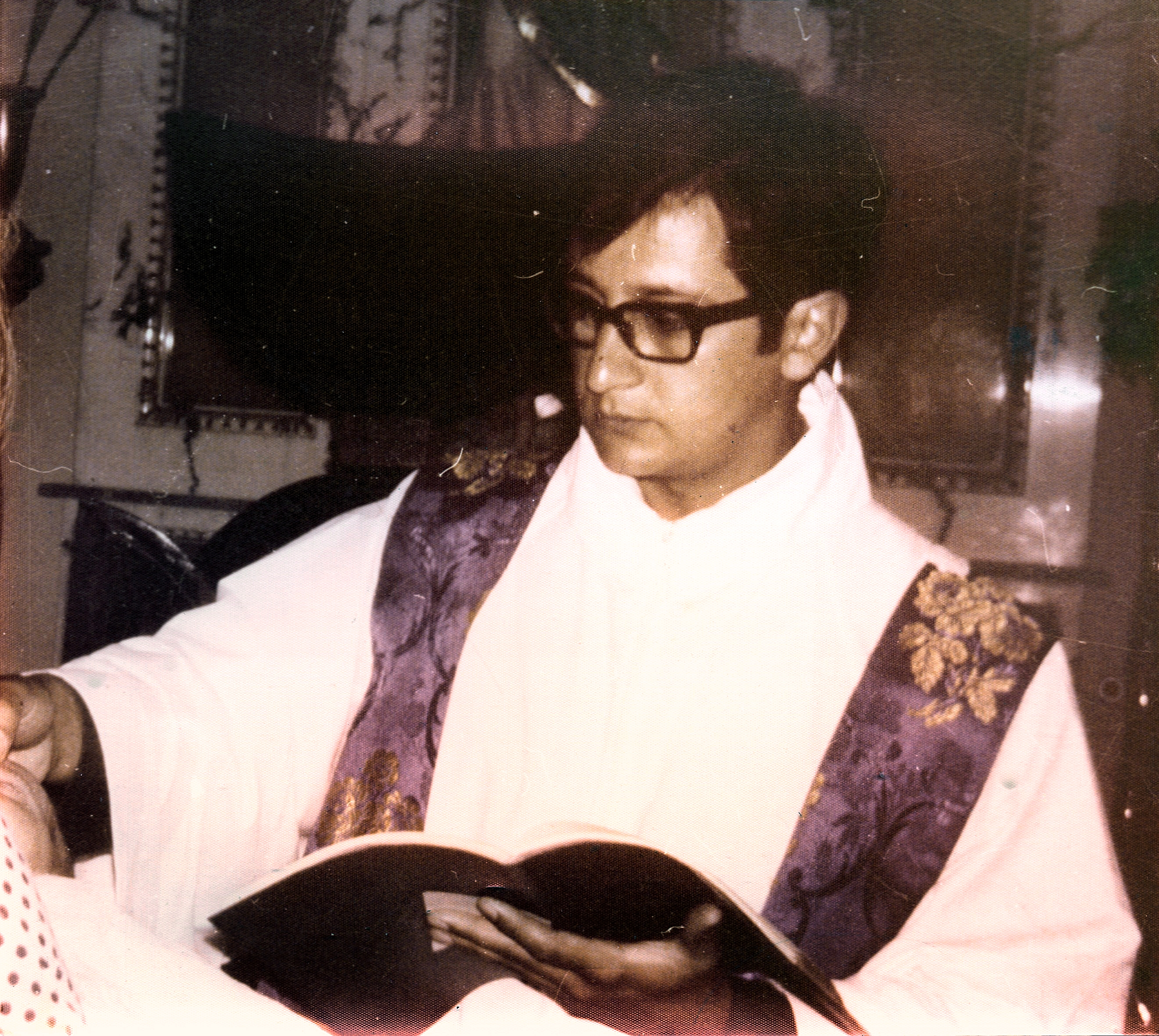
- Murias presiding over a baptism.
- Church: Catholic Church
- Diocese: La Rioja

Orders
- Ordination: 17 December 1972 by Enrique Angelelli
- Rank: Priest

Personal details
- Born: Carlos de Dios Murias; 10 October 1945 Córdoba, Argentina
- Died: 18 July 1976 (aged 30) Chamical, La Rioja, Argentina
- Denomination: Catholic

Sainthood
- Feast day: 17 July
- Venerated in: Catholic Church
- Beatified: 27 April 2019; La Rioja, Argentina by Cardinal Giovanni Angelo Becciu

Blessed Gabriel Longueville
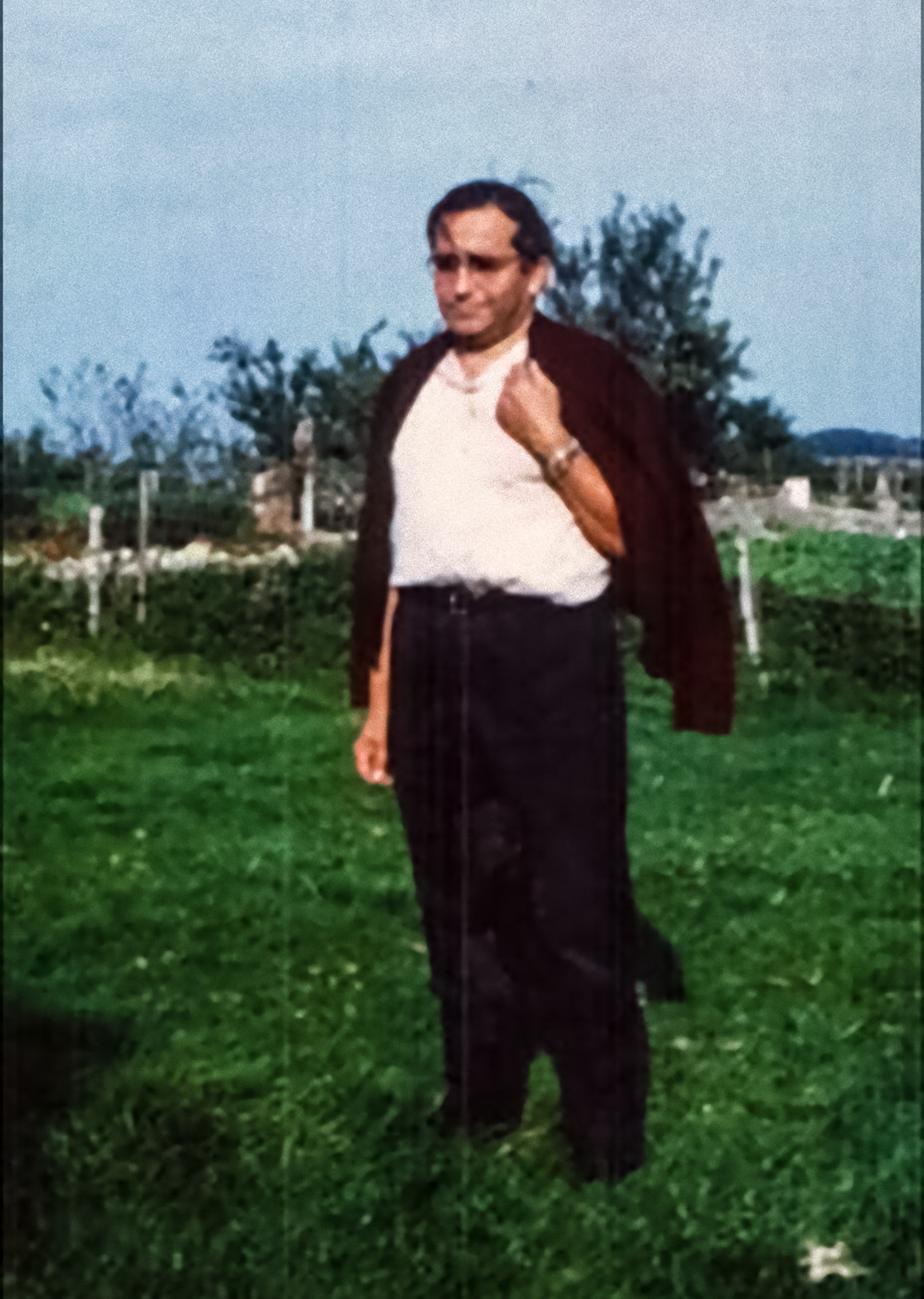
- Fr. Longueville in Argentina.
- Church: Catholic Church
- Diocese: La Rioja

Orders
- Ordination: 29 June 1957 by Alfred Couderc
- Rank: Priest

Personal details
- Born: Gabriel Longueville; 18 March 1931 Margillac de Étables, Ardèche, France
- Died: 18 July 1976 (aged 45) Chamical, La Rioja, Argentina
- Denomination: Catholic

Sainthood
- Feast day: 17 July
- Venerated in: Catholic Church
- Beatified: 27 April 2019; La Rioja, Argentina by Cardinal Giovanni Angelo Becciu

Blessed Wenceslao Pedernera
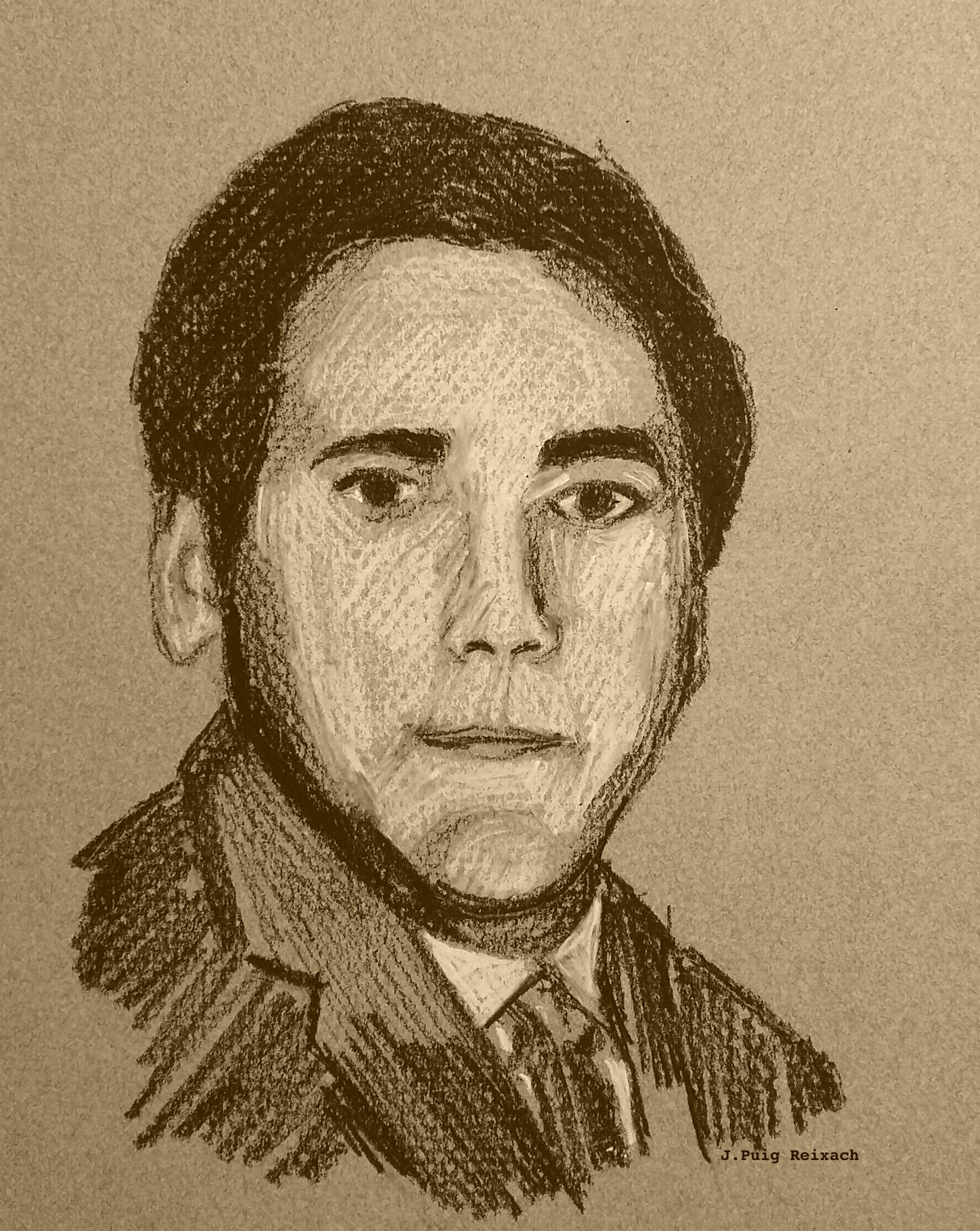

Martyr
- Born: 28 September 1936; Los Jagüeles, La Calera, San Luis, Argentina
- Died: 25 July 1976 (aged 39); Sañogasta, Chilecito, La Rioja, Argentina
- Venerated in: Catholic Church
- Beatified: 27 April 2019, La Rioja, Argentina by Cardinal Giovanni Angelo Becciu
- Feast: 17 July

Carlos de Dios Murias, OFM Conv. (10 October 1945 – 18 July 1976) and his two companions Gabriel Longueville (18 March 1931 – 18 July 1976) and Wenceslao Pedernera (28 September 1936 – 25 July 1976) were two priests and a married man who were killed in the La Rioja province in Argentina. Enrique Angelelli was the Bishop of La Rioja, murdered on 4 August 1976 while returning from celebrating a Mass for the murdered priests.

Murias was a professed member from the Order of Friars Minor Conventual and Longueville was a priest incardinated in the Viviers diocese in France before moving to Argentina where he was incardinated into the La Rioja diocese. The two worked together in a La Rioja parish before their deaths while Pedernera, who served as a lay catechist, was married with three daughters and was slain in front of them.

Murias studied civil engineering before he became a Franciscan and following his 1972 ordination began to do pastoral work in Buenos Aires before transferring to La Rioja in 1975 to collaborate with his friend and mentor Bishop Enrique Angelelli. It was in La Rioja that he and Gabriel Longueville began working together in the same parish after Longueville was sent to Argentina in 1969 from Viviers. The pair were captured one evening and found dead after having been tortured and mutilated. Wenceslao Pedernera married in 1962 and moved with his wife and three daughters to La Rioja in mid-1973 while he also helped manage an organization dedicated to social activism. He was shot 20 times in front of his wife and daughters around a week following the murders of Murias and Longueville.

The beatification for the three men was initiated in 2010 and in 2011 received the critical support of Jorge Bergoglio, the Archbishop of Buenos Aires who became Pope Francis in 2013. The three later became Venerables. Pope Francis confirmed their beatification on 8 June 2018. Their beatification, as well the beatification of Angelelli, was celebrated at La Rioja City Park in La Rioja on 27 April 2019.

== Background ==
Carlos de Dios Murias was a professed member from the Order of Friars Minor Conventual who was killed alongside the French priest Gabriel Longueville who both worked in the same parish in La Rioja after transferring from the Viviers diocese. Wenceslao Pedernera was a married man who had three daughters. Murias and Longueville were tortured and killed together in Chamical while Pedernera was killed in front of his wife and children.

The trio were murdered in a time of political conflict in which religious persecution flared and human rights abuses were rampant. The Bishop of La Rioja Enrique Angelelli - himself killed just after the trio - condemned human rights abuses and was critical and vocal about the regime that Jorge Rafael Videla controlled. Murias himself was a protégé of Angelelli and himself was outspoken about the regime. The authorities began monitoring him and his fellow pastor Gabriel Longueville while monitoring all their homilies waiting for the time to be able to arrest them. Both were kidnapped and killed with their corpses found not long after in the middle of a field. Pedernera was killed after four hooded men stormed his home and Pedernera came under suspicion due to his social activism and his helping manage a social organization.

In March 2013 both Juan Carlos Romero and Angel Pezzeta were sentenced to life imprisonment for their part in the murder of Murias and Longueville.

== Biographies ==
=== Carlos de Dios Murias ===
Carlos de Dios Murias was born on 10 October 1945 in Córdoba to an estate agent; one sibling was Marta. His father wanted him to become a soldier but Murias did not desire that career path for himself. His mother was a schoolteacher who worked in the town of Villa Giardino. He attended school in Córdoba before deciding to become a veterinarian. He abandoned this soon after and decided to pursue studies in civil engineering. But he later stopped that too and in 1965 entered the Order of Friars Minor Conventual for his novitiate while making his initial profession in 1966 and his solemn vows not long after.

In his adolescence he first met and became close with Enrique Angelelli who served as the Bishop of La Rioja. He requested that Angelelli ordain him which occurred on 17 December 1972. He first worked on the outskirts of Buenos Aires and then in a Franciscan parish.

Murias developed ties with - but never was a member - the left-wing movement known as Christians for Liberation. In 1975 he worked in the Itatí slum at José León Suárez in Buenos Aires. In Itatí he accompanied a statue of the Virgin of Itatí from house to house while reciting rosaries and fast became a beloved priest in the area. In December 1975 his mentor Angelelli offered him refuge in La Rioja following political conflict and rising violence where Murias was stationed and so he moved to La Rioja where the poor soon became his focus. This came after Murias asked for authorization to move to La Rioja so he could be able to work alongside Angelelli.

He tended to the poor in La Rioja and had a passion for being able to help them and the underprivileged people living in La Rioja. He was stationed together with the French priest Gabriel Longueville in a small parish church. Jorge Rafael Videla soon launched a coup and managed to gain control over the nation leading to increased violence and religious persecution. Murias's patron and mentor Angelelli was an outspoken critic of the regime as was Murias to a lesser extent. But Murias soon attracted the attention of the authorities with an intelligence officer stationed at their air base monitoring his homilies and those of Loungeville. In Easter week in 1976 he had been summoned at midnight to the Chamical air base (under the direction of General Luciano Benjamín Menéndez) where he was questioned for four hours. One of the soldiers told Murias that the Catholic Church "is not a Church we believe in". On 18 July 1976 he presided over a Mass at the chapel in the Santa Barbara church and said to his congregation: "Please, brothers, pray for us, we've been threatened and they're looking for us". This was when Angelelli began to fear for Murias and had instructed him to go to Rome so he would be safe. Murias promised the bishop that he would do so in September but he decided to remain in La Rioja so as to help defend the rights of farmhands who claimed parcels of land from radicalized landowners who were part of a corrupt movement.

In the evening on 18 July soldiers came to their apartment at the back of the parochial residence in a truck and van and kidnapped the pair to be taken to an air force base in Chamical. But the soldiers arrived for Murias and not Longueville; the Frenchman refused to allow Murias to be taken alone and so decided to be taken with him as a captive. He and Longueville were both tortured and shot dead with their mutilated bodies dumped in the middle of a field where workers discovered them on 20 July on Route 38. Murias was found with both eyes gouged out and his hands cut off while both men were found with plastic over their mouths and Longueville in handcuffs.

Bishop Angelelli celebrated the dual funeral of Murias and Longueville.

=== Gabriel Longueville ===
Gabriel Longueville was born in Ardèche on 18 March 1931. The Bishop of Viviers Alfred Couderc ordained him to the priesthood in the diocesan cathedral on 29 June 1957 while in 1969 the Bishop Jean Hermil sent him to Argentina. He dedicated himself to the needs of the poor and soon began working in La Rioja in the same parish as the priest Carlos de Dios Murias. Both had their homilies monitored and both were kidnapped while dining in the evening on 18 July 1976.

The pair were tortured and shot dead. His remains were discovered alongside Murias in the middle of a field on Route 38 after rail workers stumbled upon the remains. Both had plastic in their mouths and his hands were handcuffed. The Bishop of Viviers Hermil learnt of his death and travelled to the site Longueville's remains were found in order to kiss the ground and plant grains of wheat from Longueville's village as a mark of respect.

=== Wenceslao Pedernera ===
Wenceslao Pedernera was born on 28 September 1936 in La Calera. He married Marta Ramona Cornejo - nicknamed "Coca" - on 24 March 1962. The couple had three daughters together and in June 1973 relocated to La Rioja where he began working on a farm. He had first met his wife in June 1961 but Cornejo's father disapproved of their relationship. The pair married in Mendoza in the San Isidro Labrador church. Pedernera organized the Movimento Rural Catolico movement that was dedicated to social activism and addressed a range of social concerns for workers and farmers. On 25 July 1976 four hooded and armed men burst into his house and gunned him down with 20 shots in front of his wife and daughters.

== Beatification process ==
In 2010 the Bishop of La Rioja Roberto Rodríguez announced that the diocese was taking steps that could lead to the beatification process for the three men. In 2011 the Cardinal Archbishop of Buenos Aires Jorge Bergoglio (later Pope Francis), acting as President of the national episcopal conference, approved the cause without a public announcement so as not to provoke opposition prelates who opposed the social initiatives promoted by the three, especially Murias. Bergoglio's approval of the cause only became known in 2013, following his election as pope.

The diocesan process was launched in La Rioja on 31 May 2011 and the Bishop of La Rioja Marcelo Daniel Colombo closed the diocesan investigation on 15 May 2015. Seventy witnesses were heard as of 2013. The trio were titled as Servants of God on 24 July 2011 after the Congregation for the Causes of Saints (CCS) issued its "nihil obstat" edict that signaled the formal opening of the cause. The positio dossier was compiled and submitted to the CCS at a later point. Theologians discussed the cause on 14 May 2018 as did the CCS members on 5 June 2018. Pope Francis approved the beatification on 8 June 2018 which allowed for the three, as well as their fellow assassinated Bishop Enrique Angelelli, to be beatified. The beatification, which was presided over by CCS Prefect Angelo Becciu, took place at La Rioja City Park in La Rioja on 27 April 2019.
