= Aachen (German nobility) =

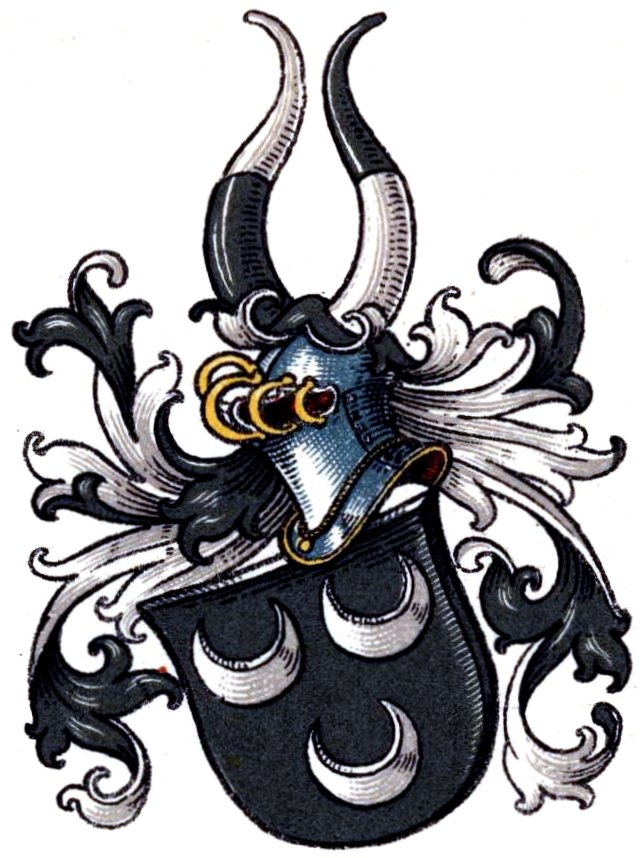
Coat of arms of the House of Aachen

The House of Aachen was a German noble family, that originated from the city of Speyer. The family was closely related to the modern German major city of Aachen.

== History ==
The family were owners of the Reigerding country estate, close to Rhede in today's North Rine-Westphalia, as well as parts of the Eichholz country estate. In the latter half of the 18th century, two family members (Klemens August von Aachen and Ewald von Aachen) were part of the Royal Prussian Army. In 1816, with the death of Ewald von Aachen, the family died out.
