= Michael Roes =

German writer and filmmaker (born 1960)

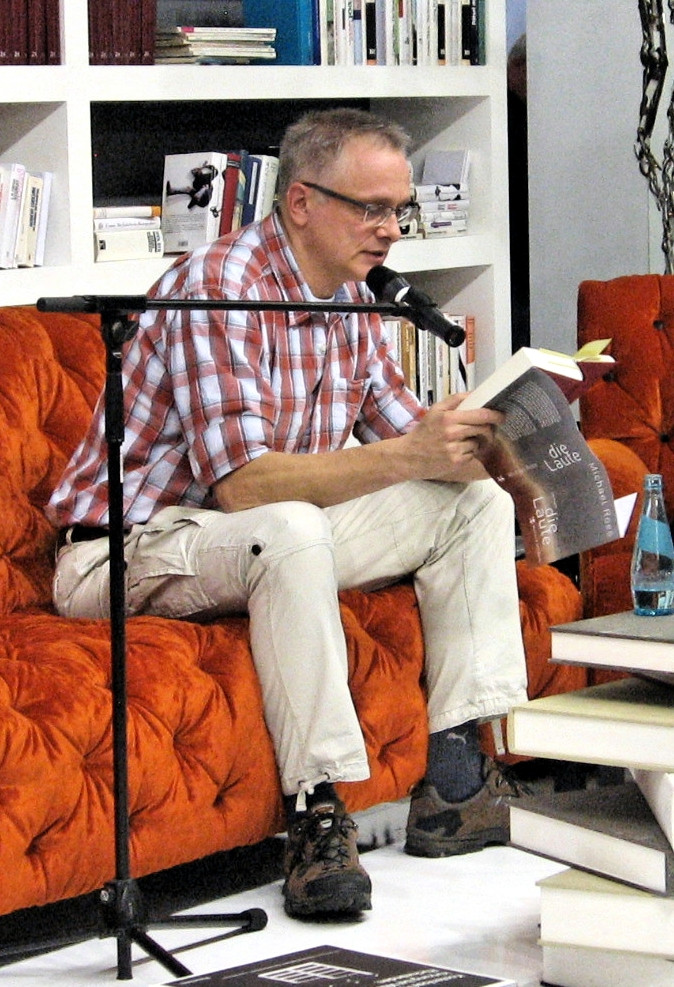
Michael Roes während einer Buchlesung auf der Frankfurter Buchmesse.

Michael Roes (born 7 August 1960 in Rhede, North Rhine-Westphalia) is a German writer and filmmaker.

Roes was born in Rhede and grew up in Bocholt, North Rhine-Westphalia.

== Education and academic career ==
He was a student of Philosophy, Anthropology and Psychology at the Free University of Berlin. He holds a Diploma in Psychology (1985) and a PhD in Philosophy (1991).

His anthropological field research was conducted in Israel and the Palestinian territories (1987,1991), Yemen (1993–1994), the United States (Native Americans in the State of New York 1996–1997; The Social Construction of Race at the Mississippi1999) and Mali (1999).

He has been a lecturer at universities in Berlin, Konstanz, Budapest and Bern. Roes was a fellow at the Institute for Advanced Studies in Budapest (1994–1995).

Roes was a guest professor at the Central European University, Budapest (2004; 2005/2006)

Roes was a research fellow at the International Research Center "Interweaving Performance Cultures" of Freie Universität Berlin (2011-15).

== Literature ==
Roes is a novelist, poet, anthropologist and film-maker with an interest in interaction with the foreign. He has drawn inspiration from a wide and diverse range of cultures in his work, from the North American Indians, featured in the novel Der Coup der Berdache, to contemporary China in Die Fünf Farben Schwarz, and from Welsh mythology in Lleu Llaw Gyffes, to the Islamic world in Leeres Viertel, Weg nach Timimoun, Nah Inverness, and Geschichte der Freundschaft. His work is characterised by syncretism, experimentation and a multicultural flavour. It reveals a desire to engage with people from other cultures, and he has a vision of intercultural learning as an active exchange, an experience that must be sought, in which one must give as well as take.

Leeres Viertel published in 1996, was the novel that earned Roes his reputation as one of the leading German Poeten des Fremden. In this novel the protagonist is an anthropologist travelling in Yemen researching traditional children's games. His account is a juxtaposition of travel writing, observations on daily life, anthropological lists, and reflections on the theory of play. Another complementary narrative strand in the novel comprises a diary written by an early nineteenth-century traveller to Yemen, Ferdinand Schnittke. Sharing a sensitivity to local customs, an interest in the traditions of the Arab world, and a similar fate, the two diary accounts closely intertwine.

Nah Inverness, published in 2004, likewise features two diary accounts. One is by Hal Dumblatt, an American director hell-bent on filming a production of Macbeth in the Yemeni hinterlands, using Yemeni tribesmen as actors. The second narrative strand is provided by Ahmed, a Yemeni officer appointed to report on the film crew's activities. The novel's plot is based on real events: Michael Roes took a small film crew to Yemen in 2000 to film a version of Macbeth, entitled Someone is Sleeping in my Pain: Ein west-östlicher Macbeth (2001). This daring project can only be viewed as the epitome of the experimentation, and an eagerness to approach the unknown, that is inherent in Roes' work as a whole. Of all Roes' works the novel is, however, the least optimistic about the possibilities of making a successful and meaningful connection with people from different cultures.

In his most recent novel, Geschichte der Freundschaft, published 2010, Roes returns to this theme with a novel that tells the story of a friendship between a German tourist and an Algerian student. – In all these novels intercultural encounters are portrayed as being complex and fragile. Relationships and friendships between people of vastly different backgrounds induce personal growth, deeper cultural understanding and involve a questioning of one's own cultural prejudices.

An idea fundamental to Roes' thinking on the topic of interculturality is the concept that that which unites the human race is much greater than that which divides it. No matter where on earth he or she may live, every human being has one thing in common – a physical body. Language and culture may keep people apart, but the experience of physical sensation forms a bond that is deeper than the superficial factors which separate the human race.

== Theatre and Film ==
Roes took part in theatre and film work with adolescents in Berlin. He worked as Director's assistant at Schaubühne Berlin (1987–1989) and at Munich Kammerspiele (1989).

His first feature film Someone is Sleeping in My Pain, a contemporary version of Shakespeare's Macbeth, was shot in New York and Yemen with tribal warriors (2000–2001). In 2003/2004 Roes made the documentary film City of Happiness about the present situation of young men in Algeria.

He made the feature film Timimoun, an Algerian road movie, based on the Greek tragedy of Orestes (2004/2005). This road movie and the novel Weg nach Timimoun by Roes are based on the Ancient Greek myth of Orestes who returned to Mycenae together with his friend Pylades to kill his mother and her lover in revenge of their murder of his father. Laid owns a small photo studio in the Algerian harbour city of Bejaia. In a letter his sister appeals to him to avenge his father who was shot by Laid's mother in an act of desperation. Together with his friend Nadir young Laid reluctantly embarks on a trip to his hometown Timimoun, the legendary oasis in the Sahara desert.

The film and novel are an anthropological journey full of danger and adventure through a country torn with political tension and under the growing influence of religious fundamentalism. Roes paints a picture of a society with violent fathers and hard-hearted mothers, but also with tender friendships.

Main subject of Roes' poetical and academic work is the role of the "stranger" or the "foreigner" in our societies. Specially the European view to the Arab world is one of the main topics in his major novels and recent films. His wide talent as a poet, novelist, play writer, essayist and film maker and his interest in outsiders puts him into the tradition of Jean Cocteau, Pier Paolo Pasolini or Bruce Chatwin.

== Publications ==
- Jizchak Essay, Berlin 1992/2005
- Cham Play, Berlin 1993
- Lleu Llaw Gyffes Novel, Berlin 1994
- Rub Al-Khali Novel, Frankfurt 1996
- Madschnun Al-Malik Play, Frankfurt 1997
- Durus Arabij Poems, Frankfurt 1998
- Der Coup Der Berdache Novel, Berlin 1999
- Haut Des Südens Novel, Berlin 2000
- David Kanchelli Novel, Berlin 2001
- Kain. Elegie Poems, Berlin 2004
- Nah Inverness Novel, Berlin 2004
- Weg Nach Timimoun Novel, Berlin 2006
- Krieg und Tanz Essays, Berlin 2007
- Perversion und Glück, Essays, Berlin 2007
- Ich weiss nicht mehr die Nacht, Novel, Berlin 2008
- Die fünf Farben Schwarz, Novel, Berlin 2009
- Geschichte der Freundschaft, Novel, Berlin 2010
- Engel und Avatar, Essay with Hinderk Emrich, Berlin 2011
- Die Laute, Novel, Berlin 2012
- Der eifersüchtige Gott, Essay with Rachid Boutayeb, Aschaffenburg 2013
- Die Legende von der Weißen Schlange, Novel, Berlin 2014
- with Hinderk Emrich: Einige widersprüchliche Anmerkungen zur Vergeblichkeit der Liebe: Ein Gespräch. Essay, Aschaffenburg 2015
- Zeithain, Novel, Frankfurt a.M. 2017
- Herida Duro, Novel, Frankfurt a.M. 2019
- Melancholie des Reisens, Essays, Frankfurt a.M. 2020
- Der Traum vom Fremden, Novel, Berlin 2021
- Lesebuch Michael Roes. Anthology, Bielefeld 2022
- Death in Aden, Novel, KDP 2023
- The Jews of Raidah, Novel, KDP 2023
- The Blind Director, Novel, KDP 2023
- Spunk, Novel, Berlin 2023

== Premieres ==
- Aufriss Theater der Stadt Koblenz, 1992
- Cham Schauspielhaus Köln 1993
- Madschnun Al-Malik Schauspielhaus Düsseldorf, 1998
- Durus Arabij, Berliner Festwochen, 1998
- Kain. Elegie Hebbel Theater, Internationales Poesie Festival Berlin, 2004
- Der Coup Der Berdache, Palast der Republik, Berlin, 2004

== Features ==
- Ein Kurzer Sommer in Tichy. Diary of a Journey into the Rebellious Kabylei. Radiofeature, SWR Baden-Baden, WDR Cologne, 2003
- Der Internetharem. Radiofeature. WDR, Köln 2005
- Weg nach Timimoun. Radiofeature. SWR, 2007

== Films ==
- Abdallah and Adrian Documentary, Yemen 1996
- Someone is Sleeping in My Pain Feature, Yemen, USA 2000
- City of Happiness Documentary, Algeria, 2003/2004
- Phaidra Remade, an Essay on Film, Budapest 2004
- Timimoun Feature, Algeria, 2004/2005
- Elevation Feature, Hungary, 2006
- Breakdance in China, Dokumentary, China 2007/2012
- Bardo, Feature, Tunisia 2016

== Grants and awards ==
- Grant of the Deutscher Literaturfonds (1991, 2007/2008)
- Else-Lasker-Schüler-Award (1993)
- Fellowship at the Institute for Advanced Studies Budapest (1994–1995)
- Grant of the Foundation Preussische Seehandlung (1995, 2000)
- Bremen Literature Prize (1997)
- Elected member of the German P.E.N. (1998)
- Grant of the Niederländisch-Deutsche Kulturstiftung (2004)
- Alice-Salomon-Poetry-Award, Berlin (2006)
- China-Stipendium des Auswärtigen Amtes (2007)
- Grant of the Stiftung für deutsch-polnische Zusammenarbeit, Villa Decius, Krakau (2011)
- Poet in Residence of the German Academic Exchange Service (DAAD) in Kabul, Afghanistan (2012)
- Fellowship at the International Research Center "Interweaving Performance Cultures" of the Freie Universität Berlin (2012 / 2013)
- Nomination of the novel Die Laute for the Deutscher Buchpreis 2012
- Spycher literary award Leuk 2013
- 2018 / 2019 37. Poetikdozentur der Universität Paderborn
- 2020 Margarete-Schrader-Preis für Literatur
- 2020 Annette-von-Droste-Hülshoff-Preis
- 2021 Poet in Residence an der Universität Duisburg-Essen
- 2022 Alfred-Döblin-Stipendium der Akademie der Künste zu Berlin
- 2024 / 2025 Annual grant from the Deutscher Literaturfonds

== Literature ==
- Christoph Schmitt-Maaß: Das gefährdete Subjekt. Selbst- und Fremdforschung in der deutsch-sprachigen Ethnopoesie der Gegenwart (Hubert Fichte, Hans Christoph Buch, Michael Roes); 2011; ISBN 978-3939381280
- Juliane Rytz: Die Metaphorik der Haut in Michael Roes' "Haut des Südens". In: Villigster Werkstatt Interdisziplinarität (Hg.): Haut zwischen Innen und Außen. Organ – Fläche – Diskurs. Villigst Profile. Münster: LIT Verlag 2009; ISBN 978-3643102614
- Seiriol Dafydd: Intercultural and Intertextual Encounters in Michael Roes's Travel Fiction; Bithell Series of Dissertations Book 42; 2015; ASIN: B00WZ4637I
- Mark Thornton Burnett: Shakespeare and World Cinema; Cambridge University Press 2012; ASIN: B009XAHDA8. Mark Thornton Burnett explores the contemporary significance of Shakespeare cinema outside the Hollywood mainstream and analyses in an extended chapter Roes' Yemeni Macbeth-adaptation "Someone is Sleeping in my Pain".

== References and Sources ==
- Literature by and about Michael Roes in the Katalog der Deutschen Nationalbibliothek
- Michael Roes in the German and English version of the Internet Movie Database
- Michael Roes in an interview about Handlungsorte in his work in http://handlungsreisen.de/
- http://www.mimecentrum.de/BREAKDANC_Salon.pdf
- https://web.archive.org/web/20121111151127/http://www.deutscher-buchpreis.de/de/544793/
