= Maria Micaela Desmaisieres =

Spanish Roman Catholic professed religious

Saint Micaela Desmaisières López de Dicastillo
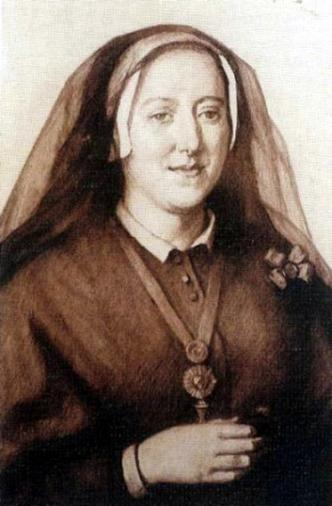

Religious
- Born: 1 January 1809; Madrid, Kingdom of Spain
- Died: 24 August 1865 (aged 56); Valencia, Kingdom of Spain
- Venerated in: Roman Catholic Church
- Beatified: 7 June 1925, Saint Peter's Basilica, Kingdom of Italy by Pope Pius XI
- Canonized: 4 March 1934, Saint Peter's Basilica, Vatican City by Pope Pius XI
- Feast: 25 August
- Attributes: Religious habit
- Patronage: Handmaids of the Blessed Sacrament

Micaela Desmaisières López de Dicastillo (1 January 1809 – 24 August 1865) - in religion María Micaela of the Blessed Sacrament - was a Spanish Roman Catholic professed religious and the founder of the Handmaids of the Blessed Sacrament. Desmaisières grew up around several European monarchs since her brother - whom she travelled with - was an ambassador to such courts though she later decided to take care of girls and women of a poorer socio-economic background which extended to the care of the ill.

The sainthood cause opened on 19 August 1902 under Pope Leo XIII - she was titled as a Servant of God - while Pope Pius XI named her as Venerable on 11 June 1922. The same pope beatified her in 1925 and canonized her as a saint in 1934.

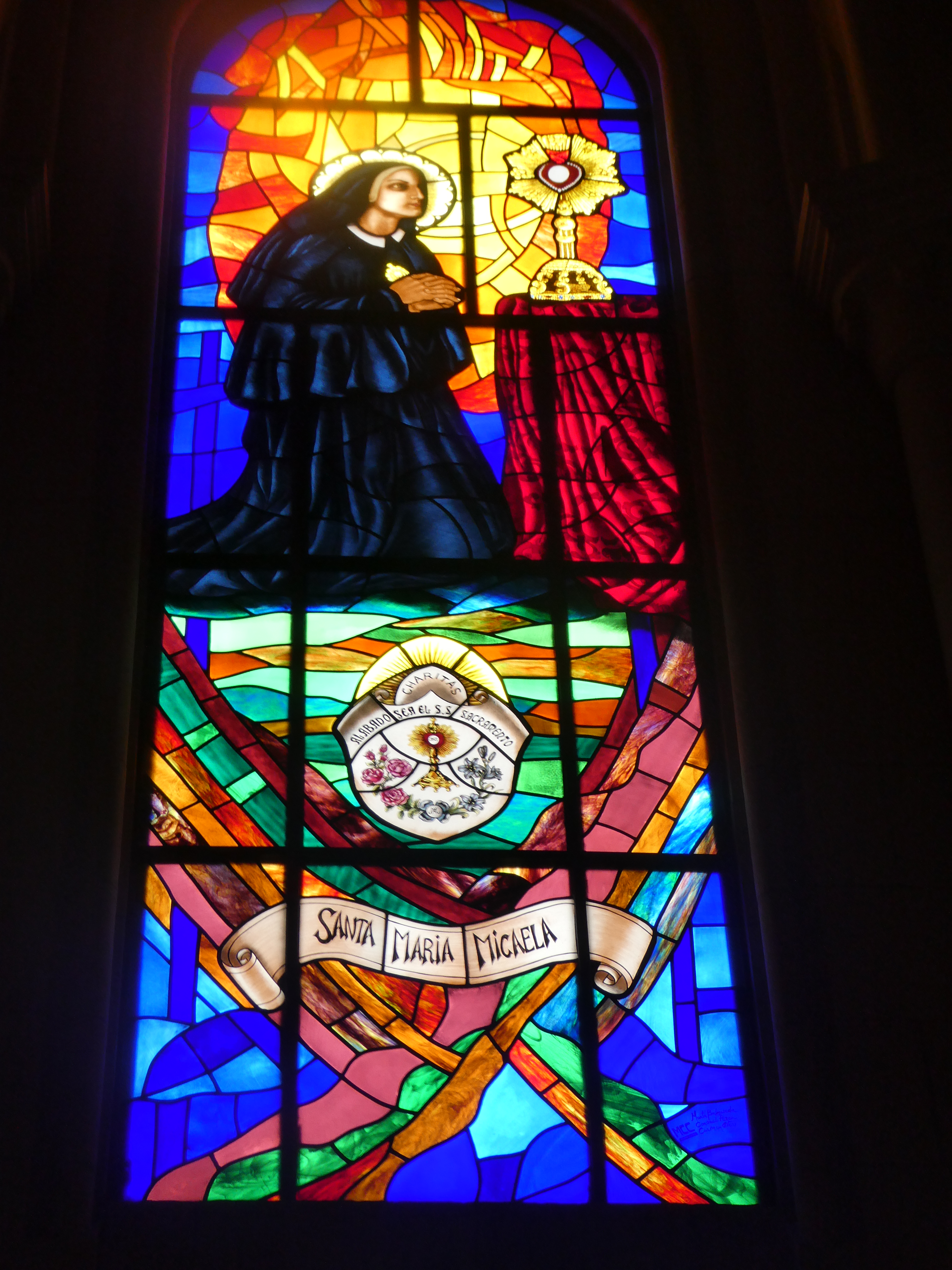
Depiction in stained glass at Almudena Cathedral

== Life ==
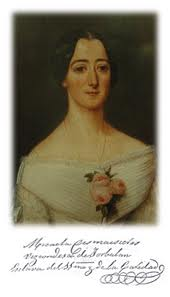
Portrait c. 1846.

Micaela Desmaisières López de Dicastillo was born in 1809 in Madrid during the War of Independence to Miguel Desmaisières Flores and Bernarda López de Dicastillo Olmeda; her brother was Diego (1806–55). Her father was a high-ranking officer in the armed forces and her mother was an attendant to Queen Maria Luisa de Parma. Her mother died in her childhood. Her brother's daughter - her niece - was Maria Diega.

The Ursulines oversaw her education. Her social connections led her to having cordial relationships with the French and Spanish monarchs as well as Belgian monarchs. She spent most of her childhood with her brother Diego - the Spanish ambassador to the monarchs. Dances and all sorts of social gatherings and horse riding were the norms for her. She received the title of "Viscountess of Jorbalán. She tended to ill people during a cholera epidemic in 1834.

It was around this period that she searched to find the direction she should give her life. She had inherited from her father a warrior's temperament which prepared her for the hard battles in her later life as well as a generous nature. Her heart was both sensitive and compassionate and her mother guided her towards charitable works towards the poor and the ill; she alternated between this apostolate and the normal life that her social class imposed upon her. She was also fond of spending time before the Blessed Sacrament and it was her love for Jesus Christ in this that it inspired the future of her work. Antonio María Claret served as her confessor from 1857 until her death following the death of her Jesuit confessor José Eduardo Rodriguez who had served as such since 1847.

In 1844 she paid her first visit to the Saint John of God Hospital in Madrid on 6 February 1844 where she met a girl - a banker's sole daughter - who had become drawn into prostitution through deception and was now marginalised and facing economic hardship. This girl's experience - as well as others - convinced her that something had to be done to help these women. She began making use of her social connections and set about establishing a shelter where these women could come for help. The shelter was opened on 21 April 1845 and innumerable girls and women knocked at the doors seeking assistance. This uncovered a great need which lead her to found the Handmaids of the Blessed Sacrament on 21 April 1845; it received diocesan approval on 25 April 1858 and then papal approval from Pope Pius IX on 15 September 1860. From 1847 until 1848 she was in both France and Belgium and she tried to enter the Vincentian Sisters in Paris but she did not after the opposition of her confessor.

Desmaisières died in Valencia on 25 August 1865 when she fell victim to the cholera epidemic whilst attending to some of the women - and fellow sisters - in the area infected. Her order spread to places such as the United Kingdom and Japan and in 2011 had 1119 religious in a total of 158 houses. Her remains were later relocated in 1891 to the motherhouse of her order.

== Sainthood ==
The sainthood process opened under Pope Leo XIII on 19 August 1902 and she became titled as a Servant of God while the confirmation of her life of heroic virtue allowed for Pope Pius XI to name her as Venerable on 11 June 1922. The same pope also confirmed two miracles attributed to her and so beatified her on 7 June 1925 while the confirmation of two more allowed for him to canonize her as a saint on 4 March 1934.
