= Kristian Liebrand =

German photographer

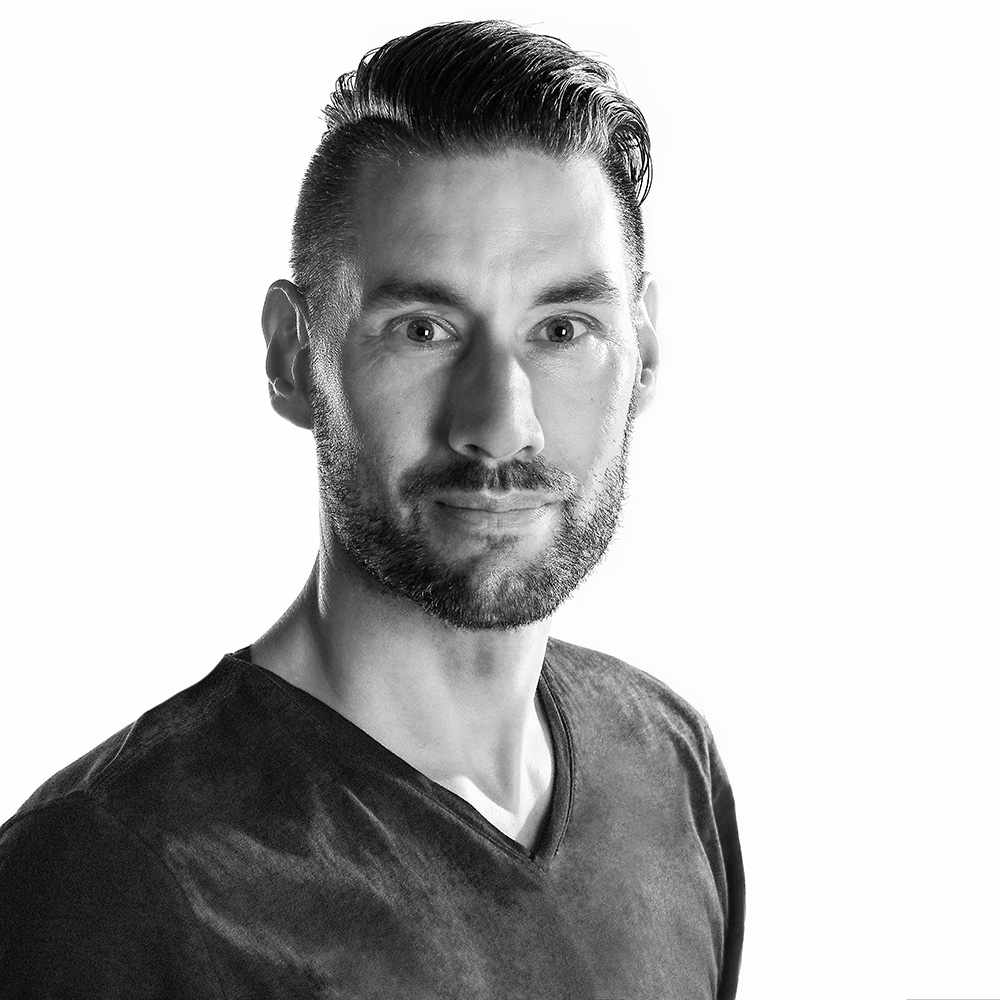
- Born: March 3, 1973 (age 53); Rhede, Germany
- Website: www.kristian-liebrand.de

Kristian Liebrand (born March 3, 1973, in Rhede, Germany) is a photographer from Germany, who concentrates on nude art photography of women.

Liebrand has been featured in a number of photo magazines, Lifestyle magazines, professional journals and TV stations.

== Background ==
Since 2010 Liebrand has received achievements in international photo contests.

His works have been published in a fine nude art book entitled more than nude – fine art photography (ISBN 3-000-38318-2) published in 2012 and more than nude - exclusive edition book published in 2014

Between 2008 and 2015 Liebrand lived and worked in Bocholt, Germany. 2016 he moved to Bochum where he built a new photo studio, called "Visible" along with many photo sets on a 360 square meters.

Between 2014 and 2016 he published the charity calendar, Mehr als eine Badewanne (more than a bathtube) aimed at fighting against the lack of water in Africa.

Between 2018 and 2020, Liebrand initiated the charity project "Mutspenden" to raise awareness for leukemia and encourage bone marrow donor registration. For this project, he photographed nude models at major tourist landmarks in Berlin (2018), Hamburg (2019), and New York City (2020). Both Liebrand and the models worked pro bono. The resulting works were exhibited and published in a photography book, which was available exclusively in exchange for a direct donation to the DKMS.

In September 2024, Liebrand organized a fine art photography exhibition and charity event at the historic Wuppertal Zoologischer Garten station in Germany. The event, which was part of the nationwide "Woche des bürgerschaftlichen Engagements" (Week of Civic Engagement), raised funds entirely dedicated to environmental protection and nature conservation projects.

In 2023 Liebrand sparked controversy by successfully suing a craft business for €10,000 (including legal costs) for copyright infringement for posting a copyrighted image on its Facebook business page without a license.

In 2025 Liebrand has been nominated as juror for the European Photography Awards and joins the international jury board.

At the end of 2025, Liebrand expanded his artistic portfolio from static photography to artistic nude and boudoir videography. Consequently, his 360-square-meter studio in Bochum was upgraded into a fully equipped film studio. His video projects in these fields are published under the domain aktvideografie.de.

2026 Liebrand published the book Der ganz normale Wahnsinn - Erlebnisse eines Aktfotografen (Naked Madness: Tales of a Nude Photographer; ISBN 978-3-384-83467-6).

== Achievements and awards ==
- 2010: Finalist Deutschlands bester Fotograf (Category Ästhetischer Akt)
- 2011: Finalist Deutschlands bester Fotograf (Category Ästhetischer Akt)
- 2012: Finalist Deutschlands bester Fotograf (Category Ästhetischer Akt)
- 2012: Winner Deutschlands bester Fotograf (Category black&white)
- 2011: Nominated for Eros award 2011
- 2012: Nominated for Black & White Spider Award
- 2012: 2 Wins at Eros award 2012
- 2013: Nominated for Photography Masters Cup 2013 (Category Professional, Nude)
- 2013: Winner User Voting Akt und Erotik (digital photo) 2013
- 2013: Nominated for Fotograf des Jahres 2013 (digital photo)
- 2013: 3. Winner (honor of distinction, professionals) Black & White Spider Award
- 2013: Gold medal Photo Art Championship 2013
- 2014: Finalist Zebra Award (Black and White Photographer of the Year 2014, Fine Art)
- 2014: Winner Fotograf des Jahres 2014 (Akt & Erotik, digitalphoto)
- 2014: Nominated for Black & White Spider Award, 2014, professionals nude
- 2014: IPA 2014, Fine Art Nudes Pro, - Honorable Mention (International Photography Awards, 8-68936-14)
- 2014: ND awards 2014, fine art nudes, - Honorable Mention
- 2014: Monochrome Awards 2014, Professional Nudes,- Honorable Mention
- 2015: Photoshoot Awards 2015, Nudes, Honorable Mention
- 2015: Fine Art Photography Awards 2015, 2nd winner in NUDES Professional
- 2015: Two nominations for the Black & White Spider Award 2015
- 2015: International photographer of the year 2015 (ipoty) - Honorable Mention, professionals nude
- 2016: Nominee in Nude Black & White Spider Award 2016
- 2016: Bronze Medal One Eyeland Photography Awards 2016, Fine Art Nude
- 2017: Honorable Mention in Nudes Monovisions Award
- 2017: 3rd Place Winner in Nudes Professional CHROMATIC INTERNATIONAL PHOTOGRAPHY AWARDS
- 2018: Finalist One Eyeland Photography Awards, Fine Art Nude
- 2018: Winner Germany´s TOP 10 Black & White Photographer
- 2018: Silver medal World´s TOP 10 Black & White Photographer
- 2018: Gold medal TRIERENBERG SUPER CIRCUIT 2018, black&white
- 2019: Nominee at the 12th Annual International Color Awards
- 2019: Finalist PhotoShoot Awards Nude 2019, urban nude & merits in category body parts
- 2019: Winner MonoVisions Black and White Photography Awards 2019, Nude
- 2019: Nominee at Black & White Spider Awards, 2019, Nude Professionals
- 2019: Nominee at the 12th Annual International Color Awards
- 2020: Bronze medal One Eyeland Photography Award 2019, Fine Art - Nudes Professional
- 2020: Finalist & merits PhotoShoot Awards NUDE 2020, urban nude
- 2020: Finalist Fine Art Photography Awards, Nudes Professional
- 2021: Silver medal One Eyeland Awards, fine art nudes
- 2021: Gold medal Trierenberg Supercircuit, streets & paths
- 2021: Finalist PhotoShoot Awards, NUDE, body parts
- 2021: 1st place 6TH 35AWARDS, Nude 18+ - Viewers Choice
- 2021: Honorable Mention Black & White Nude Photo of the Year 2021 - Monovisions Award, nude
- 2021: 1st place Black & White Nude Photo of the Year 2021 "Monovisions Award, nude
- 2021: 1st place One Eyeland Awards "Germany´s Top 10 Black & White Photographer
- 2021: Silver medal One Eyeland Awards - WORLD´s Top 10 Black & White Photographer, nude
- 2021: 2 Honorable Mentions Black & White Spider Awards, 2021, nude professionals
- 2021: Honorable Mention - Chromatic Awards Photography 2021, nudes professionals
- 2021: 2 Bronze Awards One Eyeland Awards - fine art nudes, professional 2021
- 2022: best photographer - 35AWARDS - 2022, black & white nude
- 2022: great photographer - viewers choice 35AWARDS - 2022, 100 best photos
- 2022: Nominee & honorable mention 15th Annual International Color Awards, nudes professional
- 2022: 3 nominations Fine Art Photography Awards (FAPA) 2021/2022, nudes professional
- 2022: 1st place MUSE photography awards 2022, nudes professional
- 2022: 2 photos best of nomination - 7th 35AWARDS, nudes
- 2022: 4th place 100 best photos - 7th 35AWARDS, nudes
- 2022: Platinum Winner London Photography Awards, professional nudes
- 2022: Silver Award & Bronze Award WPE Worldcup Photography Award, 1st half 2022, fine art nudes
- 2022: 3x Platin Awards & 5 Gold Awards European Photography Awards 2022
- 2022: Nominee at the "Black and White Spider Awards Awards", nude - professional
- 2022: Gold Award "New York Photography Awards 2022", professional nudes
- 2022: 2 Bronze Awards World´s Top 10 Photographer Black and White - One Eyeland 2022, nudes professional
- 2022: finalist dodho nude photography awards 2022
- 2022: honorable mention Monochrome Awards 2022, nude, professional
- 2023: platinum winner MUSE Photography Awards 2023, nudes, professional
- 2023: nominee Color Awards 2023, nudes, professional
- 2023: 3 Gold Awards London Photography Awards 2023, nudes, professional
- 2023: Bronze Award PX3 - Prix de la Photographie, Paris, fine art nudes, professional
- 2023: Platinum Award European Photography Awards 2023, fine art nudes, professional
- 2023: honorable mention Great Photo Award 2023, fine art nudes, professional
- 2023: best of contest E35awards - black and white nude 2023, nude, professional
- 2023: 1 honorable mention and 3 Official Selections IPA 2023, fine art nudes, professional
- 2023: second winner and honorable mention Black & White Spider Awards 2023, Paris, nude, professional
- 2023: Finalist World´s Top 10 Photographer Black and White - One Eyeland 2023, nudes professional
- 2024: Nominee Color Awards 2024, nudes professional, "
- 2024: Gold Winner Global Photography Award 2024", professional mix media

== Exhibitions ==
- 2011: January: Adiamo, Oberhausen, Germany
- 2012: March: Adagio, Berlin, Germany
- 2012: August to October: Große Freiheit 36, Hamburg, Germany
- 2013: July to September: Gallery Long Island City, New York, USA
- 2013: October: Gallery Merikon, Vienna, Austria
- 2014: June to July: The Modern Nude, The Brick Lane Gallery, London, United Kingdom
- 2015: November to December: Wasser spendet Leben, Gallery stilwerk, Dortmund, Germany
- 2016: August to October: Gallery Hartlauer, Linz, Austria
- 2016: September: GIESERS Kalender 2017, Bocholt, Germany
- 2016: November: Wasser spendet Leben, Bochum, Germany
- 2018: Oktober: Glas Hennes Kalender, Frechen, Germany
- 2019: September: Mundwerk - Mutspenden, Berlin, Germany
- 2020: December: 2020: Museo Civico del Territorio di Cormòns (Gorizia), urban 2020 photography award, Italy
- 2022: September: Charity-Vernissage Nude for Nature, historic train station, Wuppertal, Germany
- 2023: November: Trierenberg, Neue Rathaus, Linz, Austria
- 2023: November: PX3, Galerie24b, Paris, France
- 2024: Octobre: House of Lucie, Budapest, Hungary
- 2024: August: SWISSARTEXPO, Zuerich, Switzerland
- 2025: June: Art Expo Metro, Barcelona, Spain
