= Adoratrices Handmaids of the Blessed Sacrament and of Charity =

Adoratrices Handmaids of the Blessed Sacrament and of Charity is a Roman Catholic religious order founded in 1856 by María Micaela of the Blessed Sacrament in Madrid, Spain.

== History ==
The Handmaids of the Blessed Sacrament and of Charity was founded in 1856 in Spain. Founder Maria Michaela Desmaisieres was elected Mother General in 1859.

There have been allegations that, for decades, under the dictatorship of Francisco Franco, the girls and young women—often those who were unmarried ("fallen") young mothers, left-wing activists or otherwise seen as rebellious—were placed in the order's convents, where they were required to work without remuneration, made to suffer psychological distress, and, in some cases, had their babies stolen from them to be placed with "more traditional" families.

== Current work ==
As of 2008, there were about 1,300 members in 22 countries, including Japan, Cambodia, Vietnam, and most Latin American countries.

Project "Hope", founded in 1999, includes three homes for women who have been involved in prostitution or human trafficking.

== See also ==
- Catholic Church in Italy
