= Rhede =

- Town
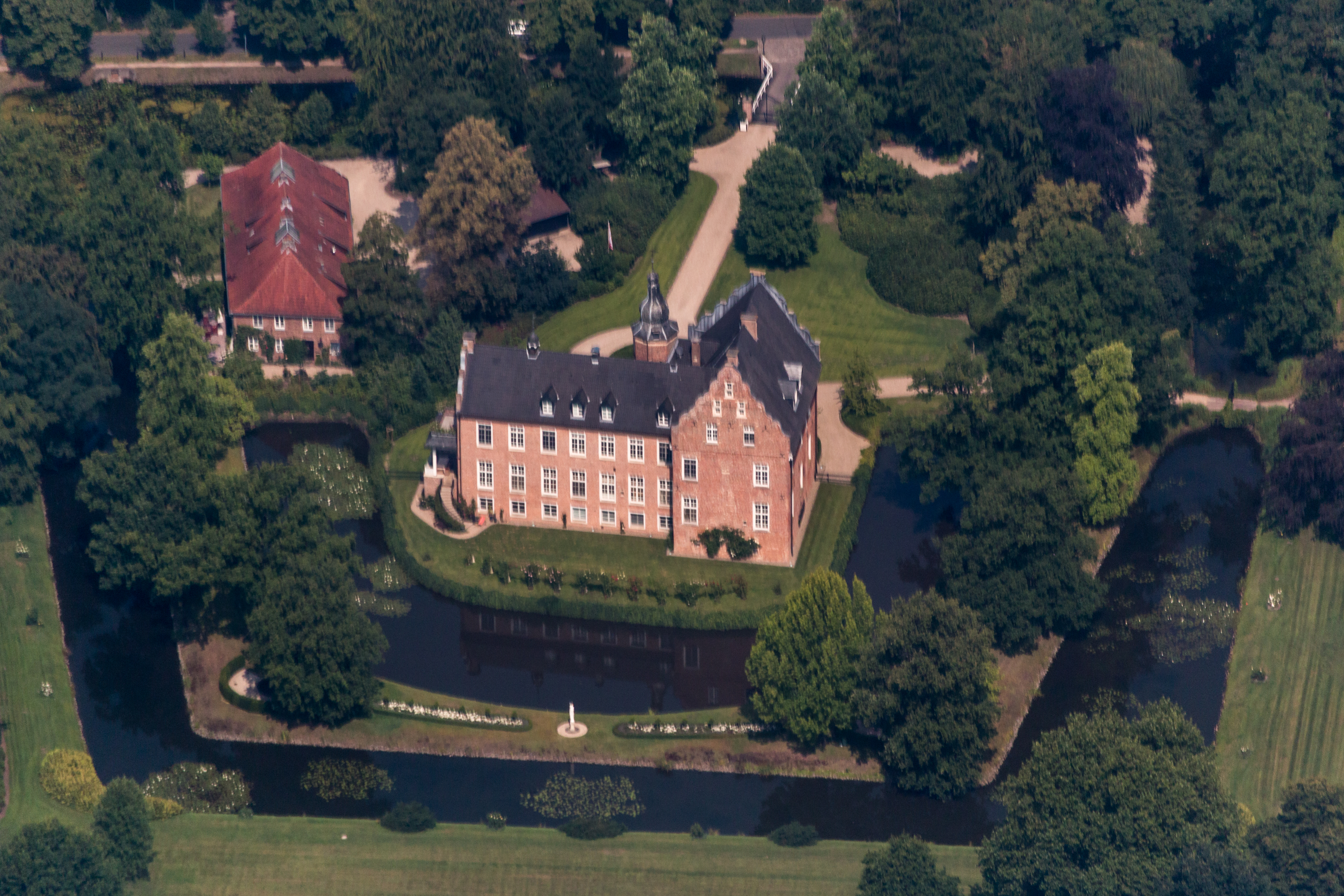
- Schloss Rhede in Rhede

- Flag Coat of arms

- Location of Rhede within Borken district
- Interactive map of Rhede
- Location within Germany Location within North Rhine-Westphalia
- Coordinates: 51°50′00″N 06°42′02″E
- Country: Germany
- State: North Rhine-Westphalia
- Admin. region: Münster
- District: Borken
- Subdivisions: 5

Government
  - Mayor (2020–25): Jürgen Bernsmann

Area
  - Total: 78.65 km^{2} (30.37 sq mi)
- Elevation: 32 m (105 ft)

Population (2025-12-31)
  - Total: 19,679
  - Density: 250.2/km^{2} (648.0/sq mi)
- Time zone: UTC+01:00 (CET)
  - Summer (DST): UTC+02:00 (CEST)
- Postal codes: 46414
- Dialling codes: 0 28 72
- Vehicle registration: BOR
- Website: www.rhede.de

Rhede (German: [ˈʁeːdə]) is a municipality in the district of Borken in the state of North Rhine-Westphalia, Germany. It is located near the border with the Netherlands, approximately 5 km (3.1 mi) east of Bocholt.

== Population ==
Historical population

Year	Pop.	±% p.a.
1965	12,657	—
1970	13,683	+1.57%
1975	14,568	+1.26%
1980	15,293	+0.98%
1985	15,889	+0.77%
1990	16,952	+1.30%
1995	18,006	+1.21%

Year	Pop.	±% p.a.
2000	18,597	+0.65%
2005	19,202	+0.64%
2010	19,388	+0.19%
2015	19,284	−0.11%
2020	19,319	+0.04%
2025	19,679	+0.37%

Source: Landesdatabank Nordrhein-Westfalen

== Notable residents ==
- Thomas Giessing, Olympic athlete
- Kristian Liebrand, photographer
- Michael Roes, writer
- Franz August Schmölders, orientalist
- Hermann-Josef Tebroke, politician
- Ulrike Tillmann, mathematician
- Bernardo Enrique Witte, Roman Catholic bishop
- Hendrik Wüst, Minister-President of North Rhine-Westphalia since 2021
