= Bernardo Enrique Witte =

German bishop

Bernardo Enrique Witte OMI
- Bishop of Concepción
- Native name: Bernhard Heinrich Witte
- Church: Catholic Church
- Diocese: Diocese of Concepción
- In office: 8 July 1992 – 28 July 2001
- Predecessor: Jorge Arturo Meinvielle
- Successor: Armando José María Rossi
- Previous post: Bishop of La Rioja (1977-1992)

Orders
- Ordination: 11 April 1954
- Consecration: 20 May 1977 by Ítalo Severino Di Stéfano

Personal details
- Born: 27 July 1926 Vardingholt, Rhede, Province of Westphalia, Free State of Prussia, German (Weimar) Republic
- Died: 21 February 2015 (aged 88)

Bernard Enrique Witte (27 July 1926 – 21 February 2015) was a Roman Catholic bishop.

Born in Vardingholt, Rhede, Germany, Witte was ordained to the priesthood in 1954. In 1977, he was appointed bishop of the Roman Catholic Diocese of La Rioja, Argentina, and in 1992 was appointed bishop of the Roman Catholic Diocese of Concepción retiring in 2001.
