= Diocese of La Rioja =

Catholic ecclesiastical territory

Coordinates: 29.4135°S 66.8563°W

Diocese of La Rioja Dioecesis Rioiensis Diócesis de La Rioja

Catholic
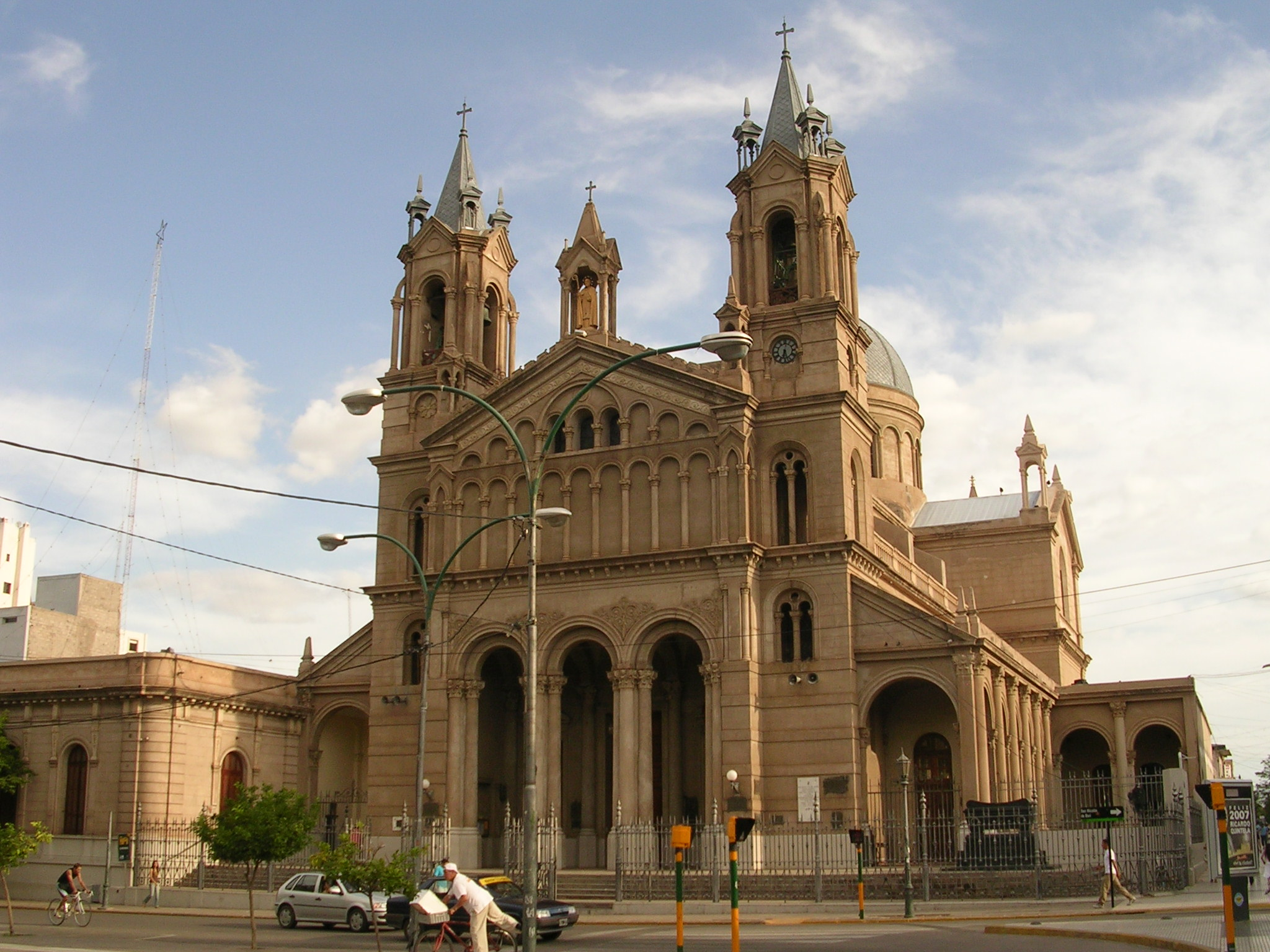
- Cathedral Basilica of St. Nicholas of Bari

Location
- Country: Argentina
- Ecclesiastical province: San Juan de Cuyo
- Metropolitan: San Juan de Cuyo

Statistics
- Area: 92,100 km^{2} (35,600 sq mi)
- Population: Total; Catholics: (as of 2004); 305,000; 265,350 (87%)
- Parishes: 28

Information
- Denomination: Roman Catholic
- Rite: Roman Rite
- Established: 20 April 1934 (92 years ago)
- Cathedral: Cathedral Basilica of St Nicholas in La Rioja
- Patron saint: Saint Nicholas; St Francis Solanus

Current leadership
- Pope: Leo XIV
- Bishop: Dante Gustavo Braida Lorenzón
- Metropolitan Archbishop: Jorge Eduardo Lozano
- Bishops emeritus: Roberto Rodríguez

The Roman Catholic Diocese of La Rioja (Latin: Dioecesis Rioiensis) is in Argentina and is a suffragan of the Archdiocese of San Juan de Cuyo.

On Tuesday, July 9, 2013, Pope Francis accepted the resignation from the pastoral care of the Roman Catholic Diocese of La Rioja (La Rioja, Argentina), presented by Bishop Roberto Rodríguez, in accordance with Canon 401.1 of the Latin-rite 1983 Code of Canon Law.

Pope Francis appointed as the next bishop of the same diocese, Bishop Daniel Marcelo Colombo, until now serving as the bishop of the Roman Catholic Diocese of Oran. Bishop Daniel Marcelo Colombo was born in the national capital and largest city, Buenos Aires, Argentina, on March 27, 1961, after earning a bachelor's degree of mercantile appraiser and the title of lawyer at the University of Buenos Aires. In 1982 he entered the seminary of Quilmes. Ordained a priest on 16 December 1988, in 1994 he obtained a doctorate in canon law from the Angelicum, in Rome. He held various positions in different parishes, in the Curia and the Seminary of Quilmes and was professor at the Faculty of Canon Law of the Catholic University Argentina and Episcopal Delegate at the Catholic University of La Plata. In 2004 he was appointed parish priest of the Cathedral of Quilmes.

He was appointed Bishop of Oran on May 8, 2008, and was consecrated on 8 August following.

== History ==
On 20 April 1934 Pope Pius XI founded the Diocese of La Rioja from territory taken from the Diocese of Córdoba del Tucumán.

== Bishops ==
=== Ordinaries ===
- Froilán Ferreira Reinafé (1934–1964)
- Horacio Arturo Gómez Dávila (1964–1968)
- Enrique A. Angelelli Carletti (1968–1976)
- Bernardo Enrique Witte, O.M.I. (1977–1992), appointed Bishop of Concepción
- Fabriciano Sigampa (1992–2005), appointed Archbishop of Resistencia
- Roberto Rodríguez (2006–2013)
- Daniel Marcelo Colombo (2013–2018), appointed Archbishop of Mendoza
- Dante Gustavo Braida Lorenzón (2018- )

=== Coadjutor bishop ===
- Horacio Arturo Gómez Dávila (1960–1964)

=== Other priest of this diocese who became bishop ===
- Enrique Alberto Martínez Ossola, appointed auxiliary bishop of Santiago del Estero in 2017
