= Sañogasta =

Coordinates: 29°18′S 67°36′W

- Municipality and village
- Interactive map of Sañogasta
- Country: Argentina
- Province: La Rioja Province
- Time zone: UTC−3 (ART)
- Climate: BWk

Sañogasta is a municipality and village in La Rioja Province in northwestern Argentina.
