= Chamical =

- City
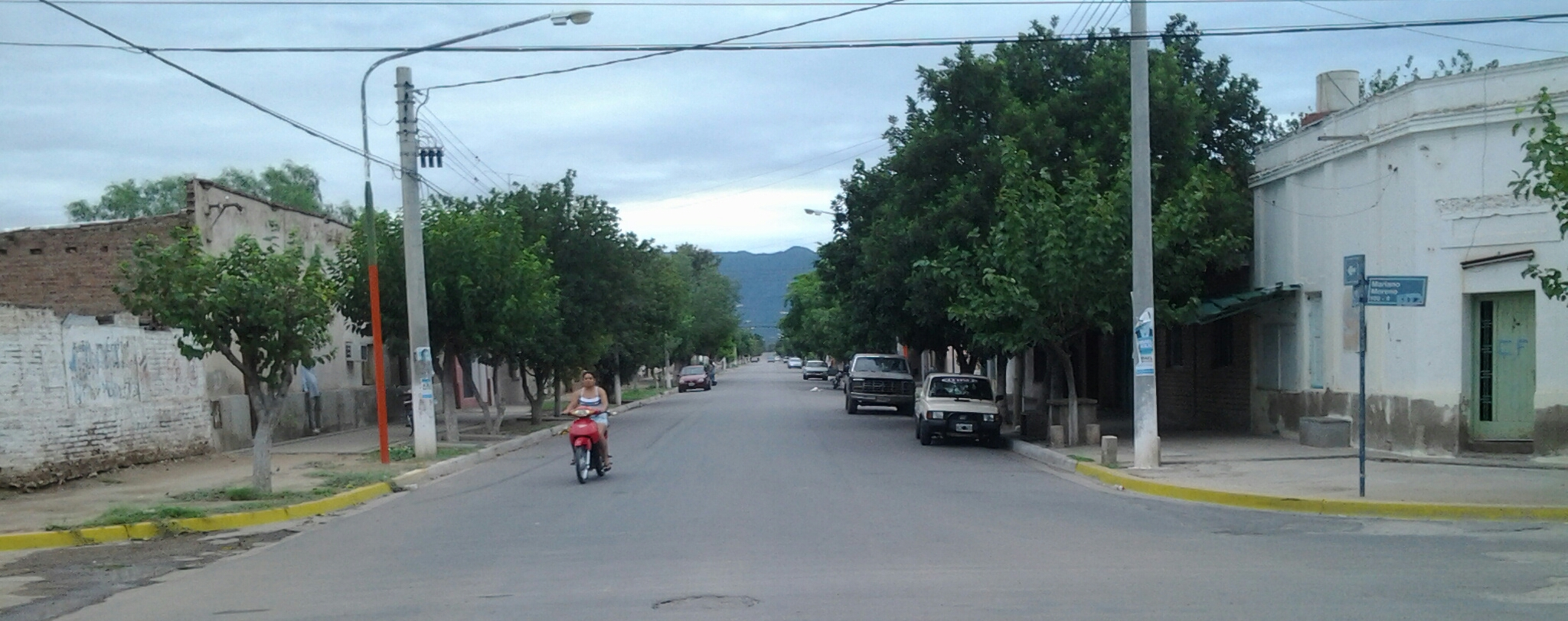
- View southwest along Avenida Perón in downtown Chamical. The brushy Sierra de los Quinteros range can be seen in the far background (8.5 miles away as the crow flies)

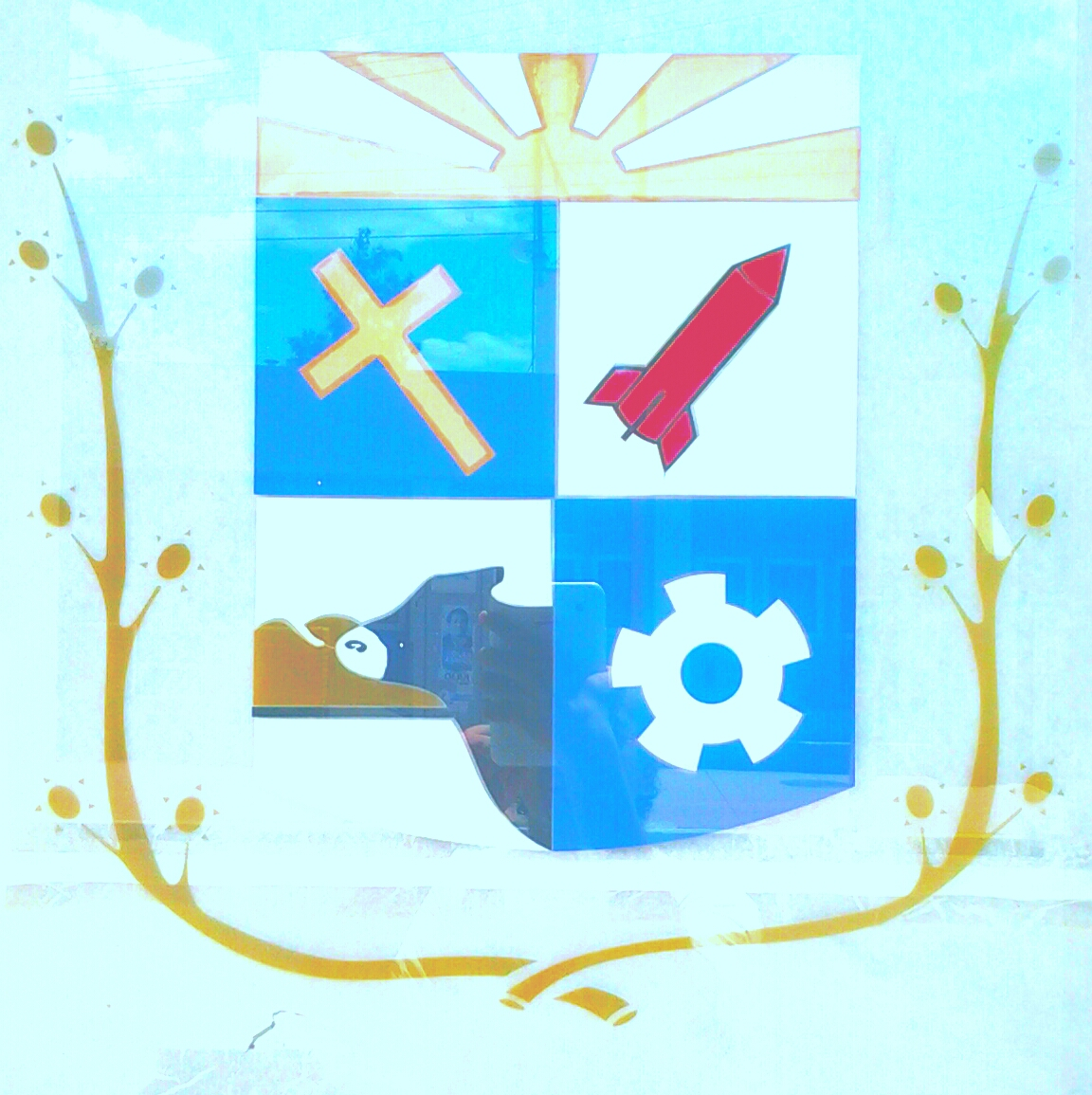
- Seal
- Nicknames: Perla de los Llanos ("Pearl of the Plains"), Ciudad del Cohete ("Rocket City"), Cunabula Primae Bestiae
- Map of Argentina with Chamical highlighted
- Coordinates: 30°21′S 66°19′W
- Country: Argentina
- Province: La Rioja
- City status: 1955

Government
  - Intendant: Dora Rodríguez (Justicialist Party)
- Elevation (at City Hall): 471 m (1,545 ft)

Population (2022 census)
  - Total: 15,666
- Time zone: UTC−3 (ART)
- Zip code: F5380
- Area code: 03826
- Climate: BSh

Chamical is a small city in, and the seat of government of, Chamical Department in the south of La Rioja Province of Argentina. With a population numbering 15,666 permanent residents at the 2022 census [INDEC], up from 12,919 at the time of the 2010 census, it is the fourth-most populous settlement in La Rioja Province after Aimogasta. It is home to the CELPA aerospace test center, founded in 1961 and operated by the Argentine Air Force. The town, which is crossed by the Tirante wadi, lies on the Ruta 38 (Spanish Wikipedia), around 135 km from La Rioja (1 hour 24 minutes by car), and some 295 km from Córdoba (3 hours 3 minutes by car).

This young urban habitation has been an important site in several stages of Argentine history during the past fifty years. Chamical has plentiful wilderness touristic spots, such as "Las Ollitas" (a natural waterfall lake) and "La Salina" (a long salt flat).

Chamical is regarded as the tango hub in La Rioja Province.

The local demonym for Chamical is a Chamicalense.

== Name origin ==
Chamical got its name from the many specimens of the medicinal herb known in Spanish as chamico (meaning "jimsonweed" in the said language) found growing wild in the area.

== Geography ==
Chamical is located in the droughty Llanos Riojanos (Spanish for "Riojan Plains") and has four marked seasons, giving it a BSh hot semi-arid climate under the Köppen climate classification. The dry period of April to October is mild to cool, with the normal monthly mean temperature reaching its lowest in July at 11.7 °C (53.1 °F). The rainy period of November to March is warm to hot, with the normal monthly mean temperature peaking in January at 26.4 °C (79.5 °F). There has hardly ever been any snow or frost, but there has often been hail.

Total yearly precipitation averages a scanty 448.8 millimetres (18 in) with plentiful sunny days, and the rainfall centers in summer. The wettest month is January, during which time Chamical receives an average of 94.1 millimetres (4 in).

Winters are quite cool, but usually sunny; rather, snowfall is an odd occurrence. The Servicio Meteorológico Nacional reports that July is the coldest month with a mean high of 18.7 °C (65.7 °F) and a mean low of 5.7 °C (42.3 °F). Springtime is mild, windy and usually warm. Summers are hot (as is common with La Rioja Province), somewhat rainy and, most often, the mercury rises to 38 degrees Celsius (≈100 Fahrenheit) or higher in the shade, which means unpleasant. The rain brings some relief from the stifling Riojan heat. January, the warmest month, has an average high of 33.4 °C (92.1 °F) and an average low of 20.1 °C (68.2 °F). Fall is mild and pleasant, but can go chilly.

The highest temperature ever recorded was 45.5 °C (113.9 °F) on December 25, 2013 while the lowest temperature on record was −7.7 °C (18.1 °F) on July 31, 1993.

Climate data for Chamical (1991–2020, extremes 1963–present)
Month	Jan	Feb	Mar	Apr	May	Jun	Jul	Aug	Sep	Oct	Nov	Dec	Year
Record high °C (°F)	45.2 (113.4)	43.5 (110.3)	40.5 (104.9)	38.2 (100.8)	34.5 (94.1)	29.3 (84.7)	31.5 (88.7)	40.4 (104.7)	41.7 (107.1)	43.0 (109.4)	43.7 (110.7)	45.5 (113.9)	45.5 (113.9)
Mean daily maximum °C (°F)	33.8 (92.8)	31.9 (89.4)	29.5 (85.1)	25.6 (78.1)	21.4 (70.5)	18.6 (65.5)	18.7 (65.7)	22.4 (72.3)	25.7 (78.3)	29.3 (84.7)	31.8 (89.2)	33.8 (92.8)	26.9 (80.4)
Daily mean °C (°F)	27.0 (80.6)	25.3 (77.5)	23.2 (73.8)	19.3 (66.7)	15.2 (59.4)	11.8 (53.2)	11.0 (51.8)	14.3 (57.7)	18.1 (64.6)	22.1 (71.8)	24.6 (76.3)	26.6 (79.9)	19.9 (67.8)
Mean daily minimum °C (°F)	20.6 (69.1)	19.5 (67.1)	18.0 (64.4)	14.3 (57.7)	10.2 (50.4)	6.5 (43.7)	5.0 (41.0)	7.5 (45.5)	10.9 (51.6)	15.0 (59.0)	17.8 (64.0)	19.6 (67.3)	13.7 (56.7)
Record low °C (°F)	10.3 (50.5)	8.9 (48.0)	4.5 (40.1)	1.0 (33.8)	−4.0 (24.8)	−5.0 (23.0)	−8.3 (17.1)	−7.5 (18.5)	−3.1 (26.4)	−0.5 (31.1)	4.5 (40.1)	6.0 (42.8)	−8.3 (17.1)
Average precipitation mm (inches)	93.4 (3.68)	88.3 (3.48)	67.2 (2.65)	27.6 (1.09)	10.2 (0.40)	3.4 (0.13)	3.2 (0.13)	2.7 (0.11)	7.8 (0.31)	28.1 (1.11)	45.5 (1.79)	82.7 (3.26)	460.1 (18.11)
Average precipitation days (≥ 0.1 mm)	7.4	6.2	6.3	4.2	2.6	1.6	0.9	0.9	1.9	3.0	5.1	6.8	47.0
Average snowy days	0.0	0.0	0.0	0.0	0.0	0.1	0.1	0.0	0.0	0.0	0.0	0.0	0.1
Average relative humidity (%)	58.3	62.6	67.3	69.0	70.3	68.2	60.2	49.7	46.5	48.3	50.7	53.5	58.7
Mean monthly sunshine hours	285.2	234.5	217.0	189.0	179.8	171.0	207.7	235.6	240.0	260.4	279.0	294.5	2,793.7
Mean daily sunshine hours	9.2	8.3	7.0	6.3	5.8	5.7	6.7	7.6	8.0	8.4	9.3	9.5	7.6
Percentage possible sunshine	62.7	54.2	53.2	57.6	51.4	51.6	66.0	66.0	63.4	62.8	63.2	71.6	59.0
Source 1: Servicio Meteorológico Nacional (percent sun 1991–2000)
Source 2: Oficina de Riesgo Agropecuario (record highs and lows)

== Landmarks ==
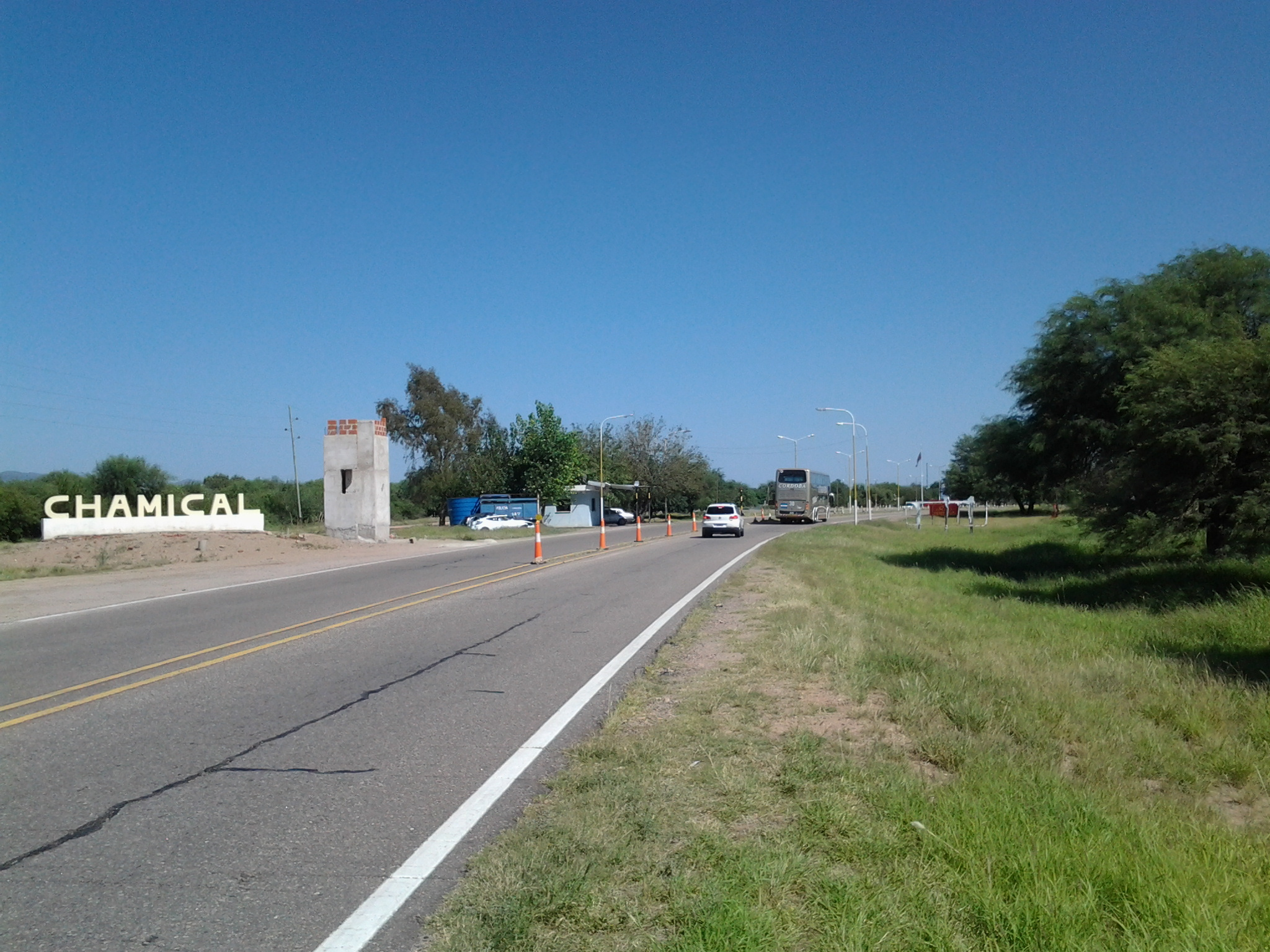
Motor vehicles at the east entrance to Chamical on Argentina Route 38

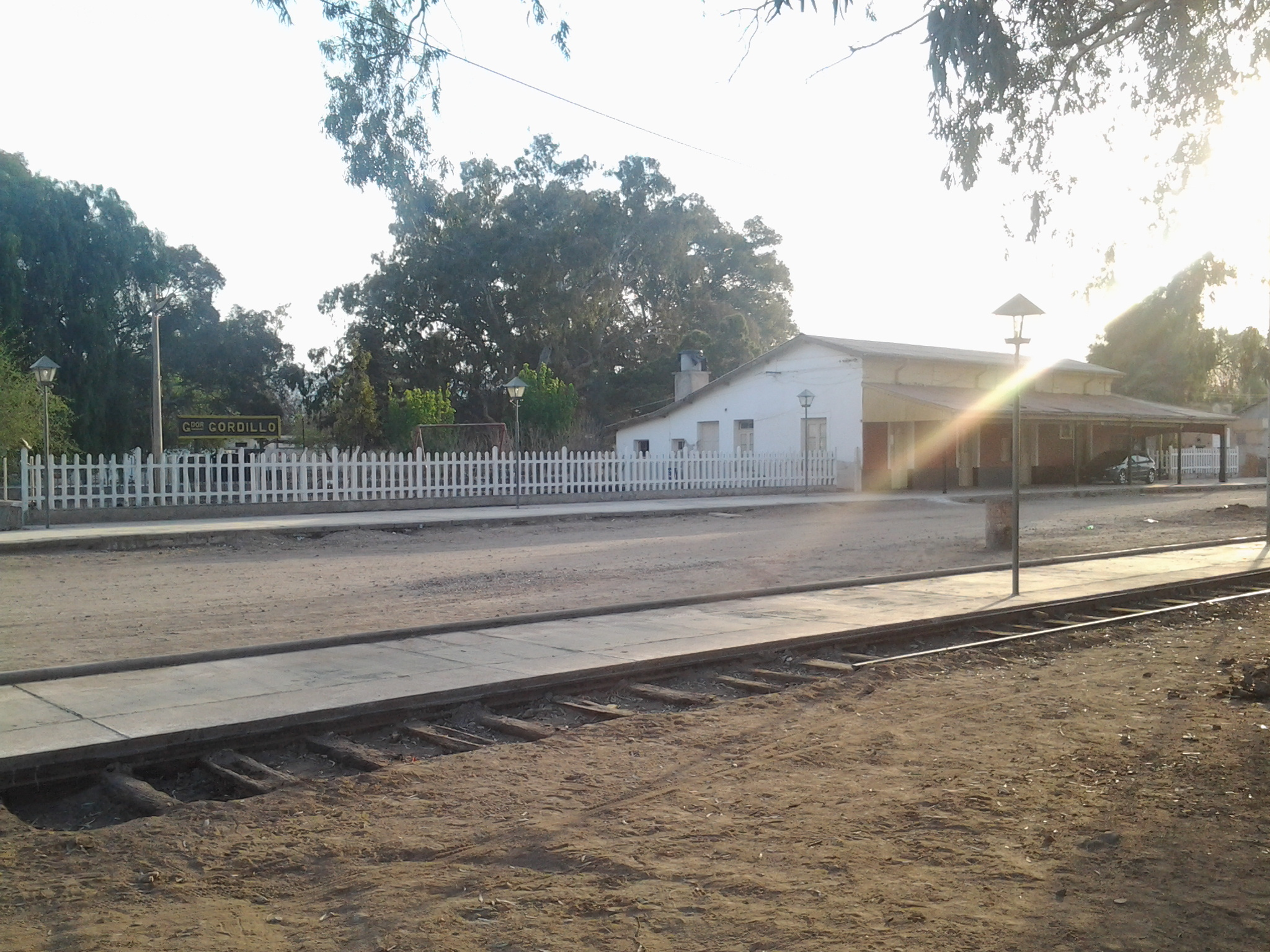
Chamical's former railroad station, now housing the local museum.

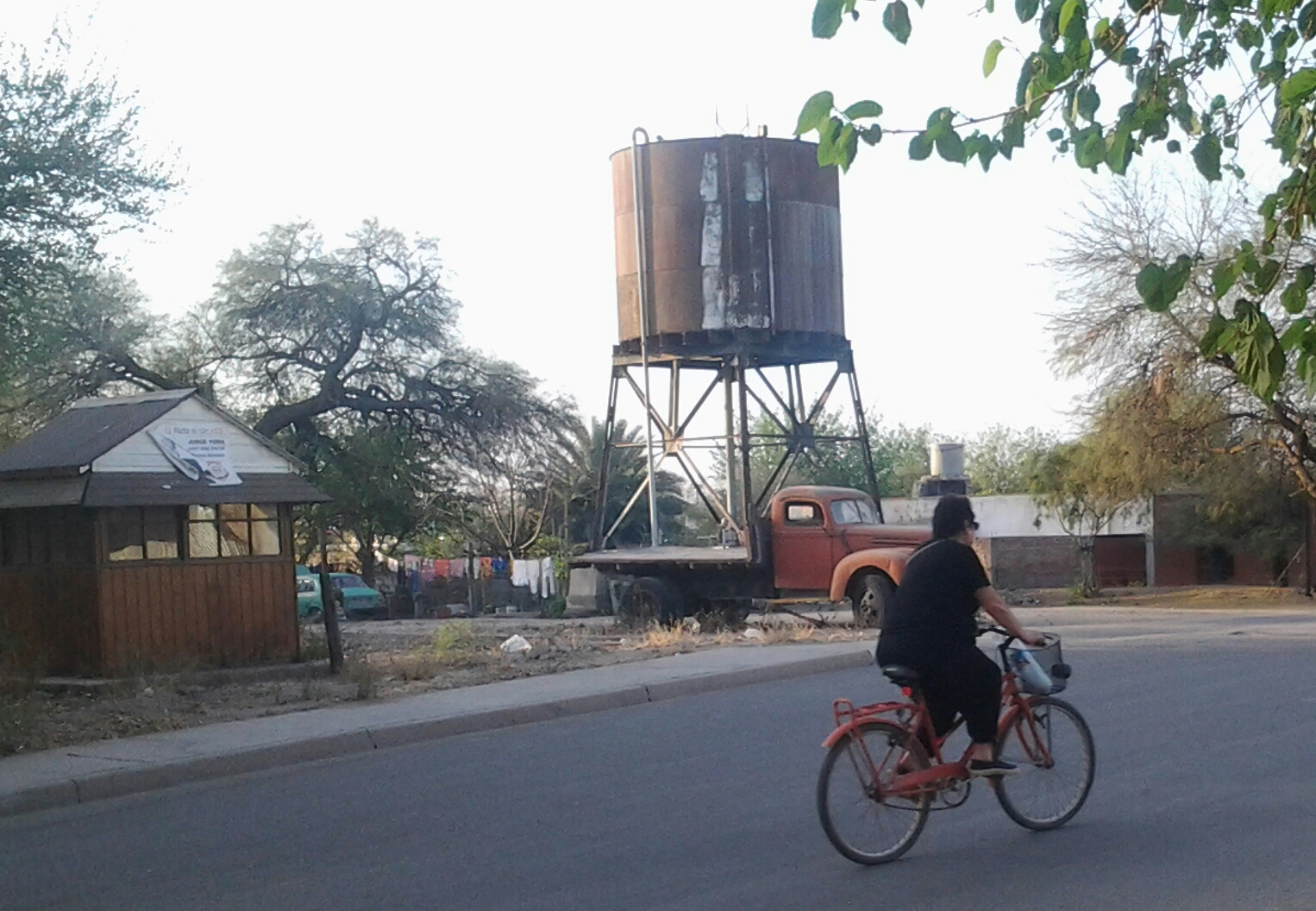
The dilapidated albeit quaint railroad water tower in the background (beyond the derelict truck) is a heritage asset; it was built up by a British company in the late nineteenth century.

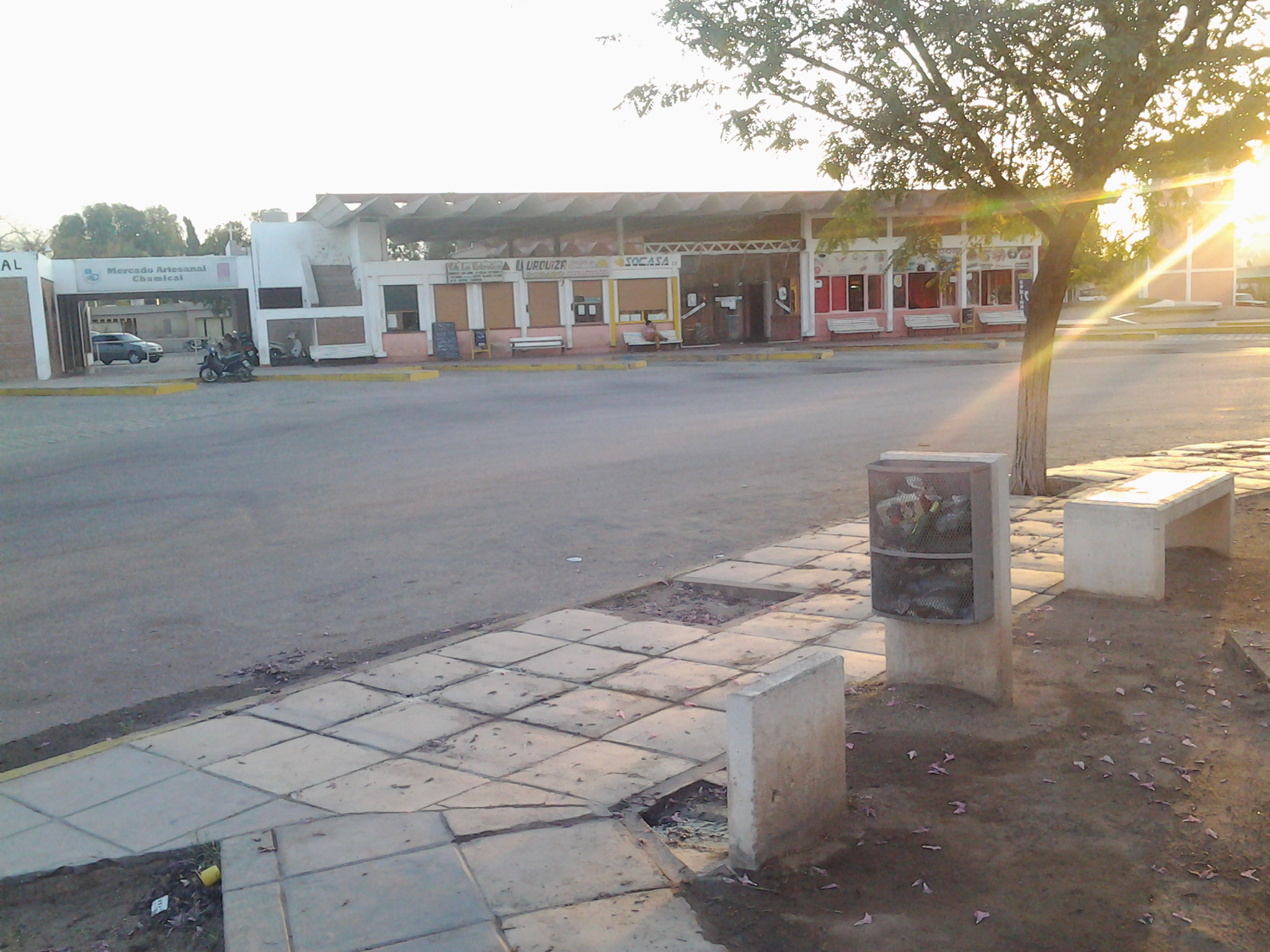
Chamical Bus Depot.

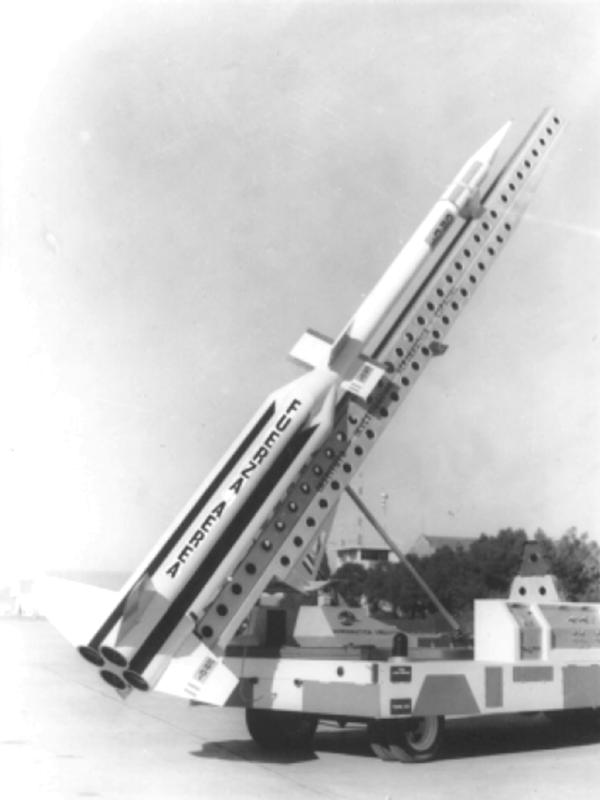
A sounding rocket on a mobile launch pad at CELPA launching facility. The picture dates back to 1969.

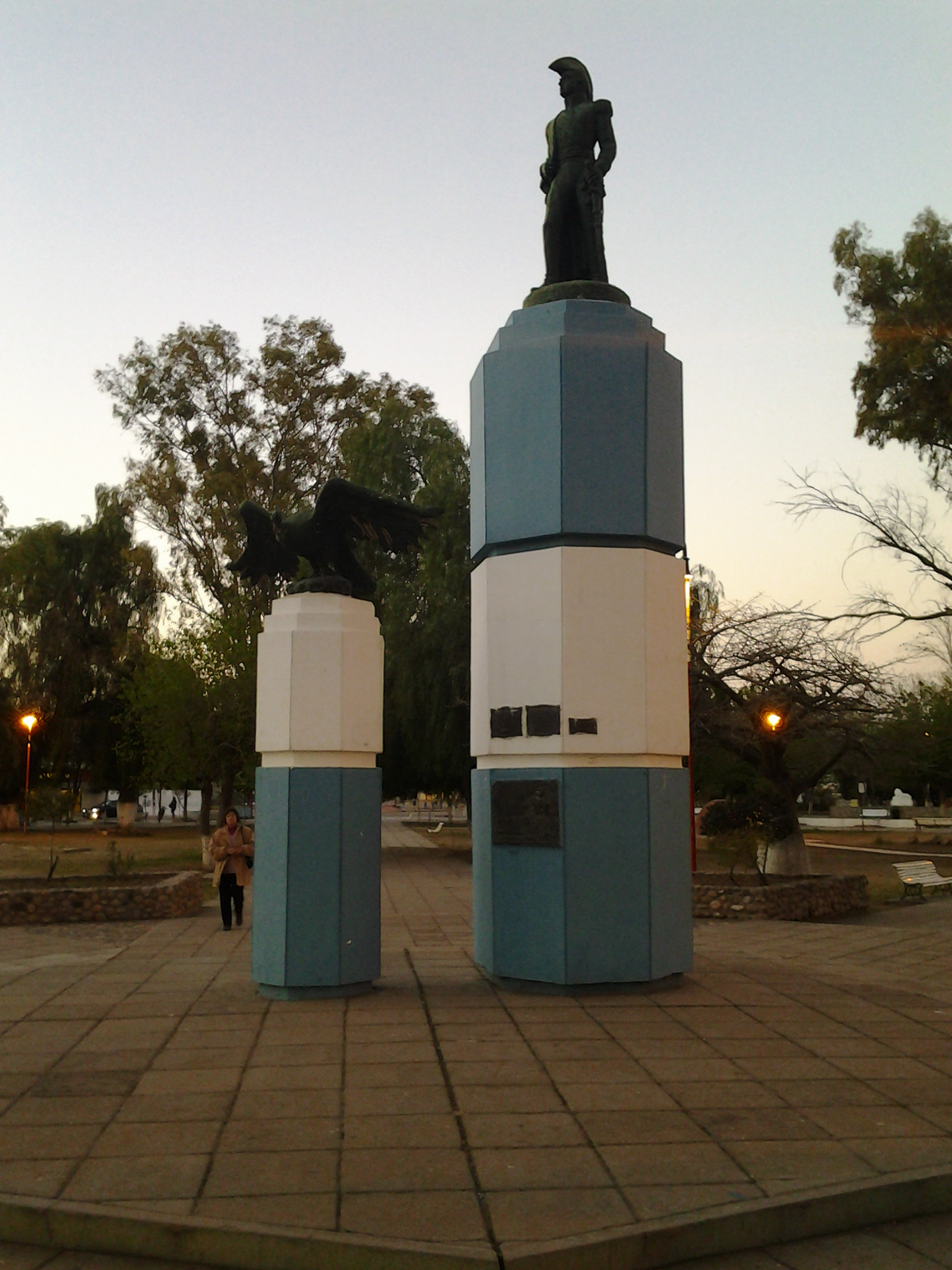
San Martín memorial at the middle of the namesake garden square in downtown at evening twilight.

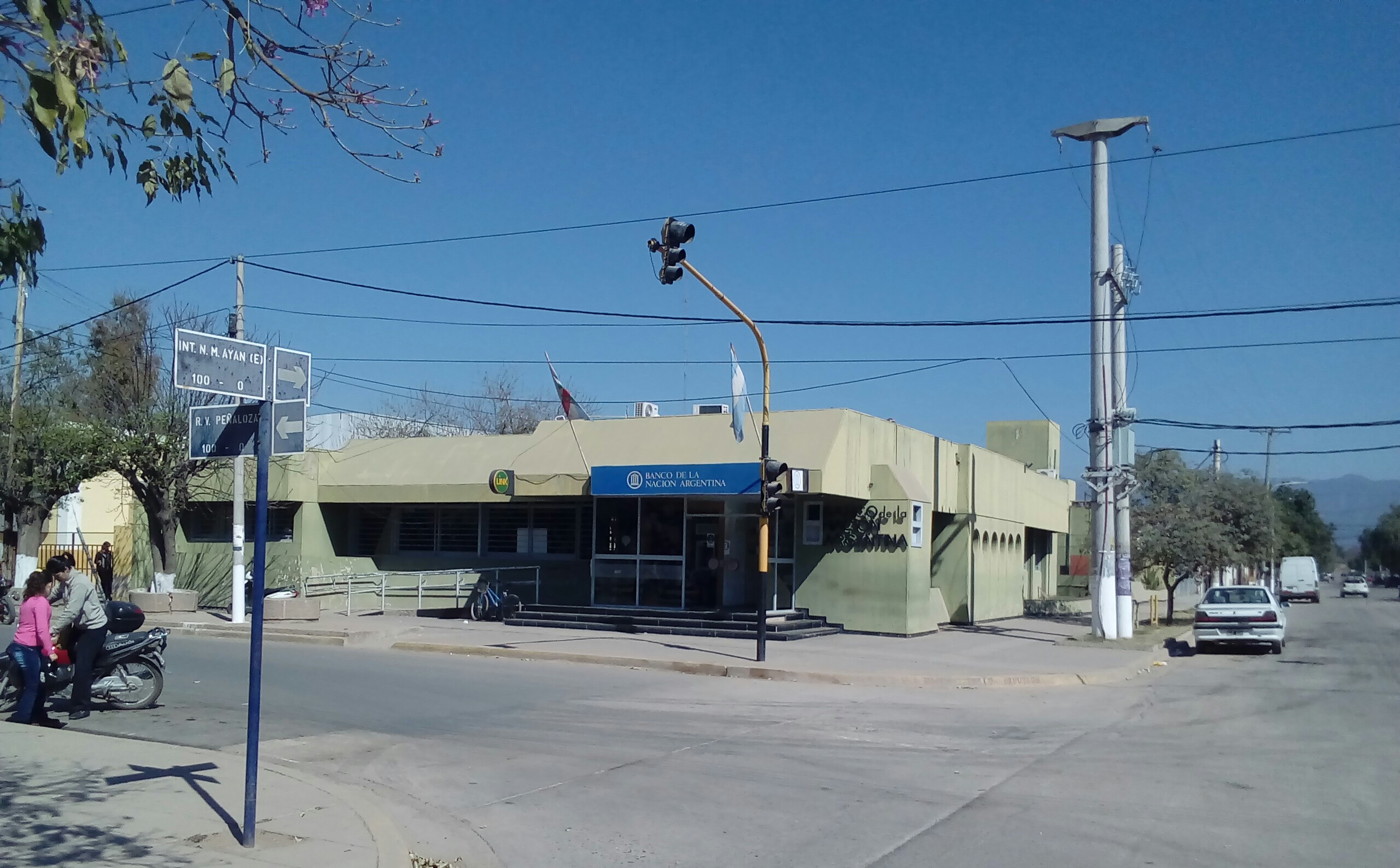
Classic brutalist architecture at this Chamical bank.

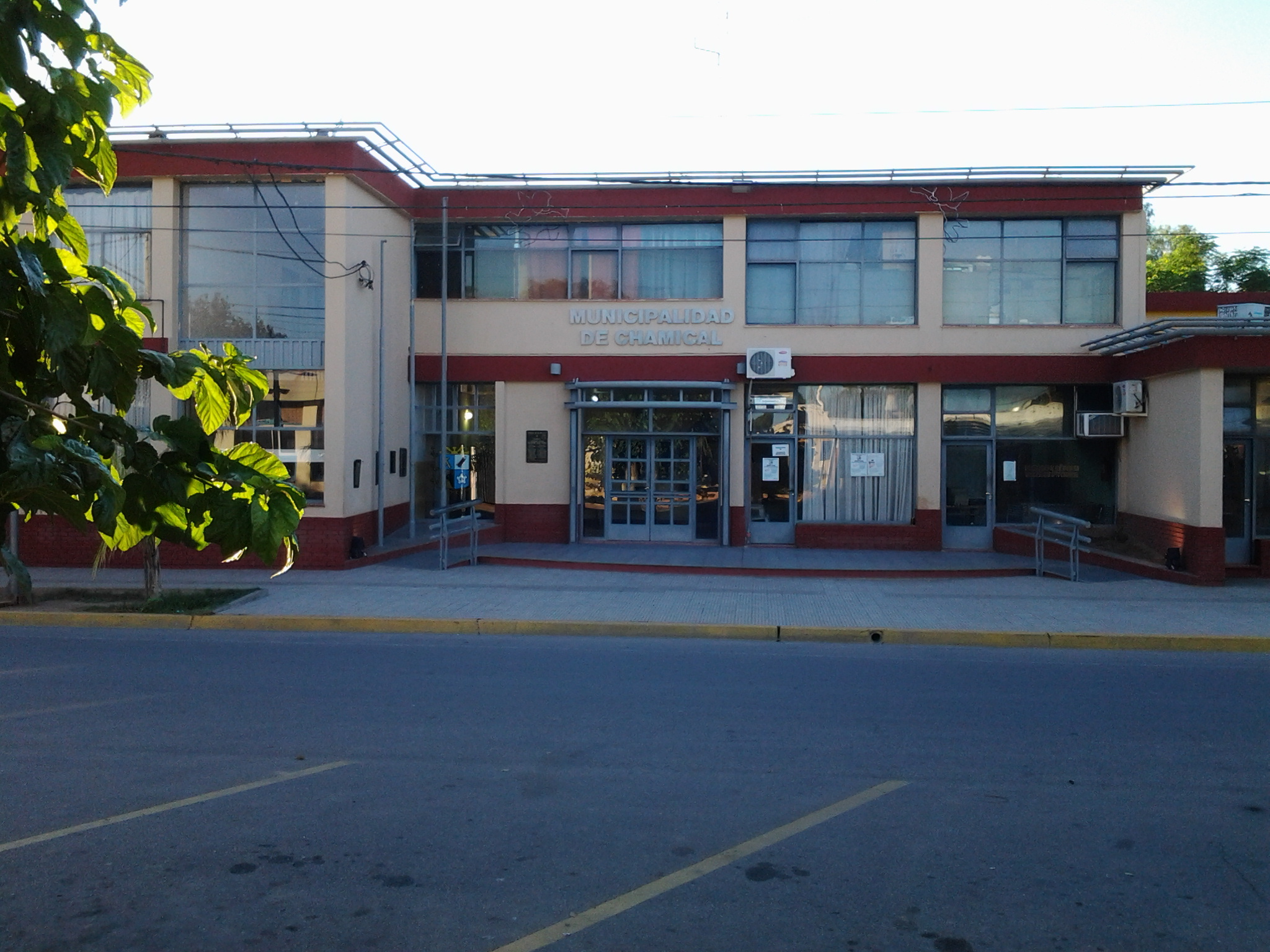
Chamical City Hall, located downtown.

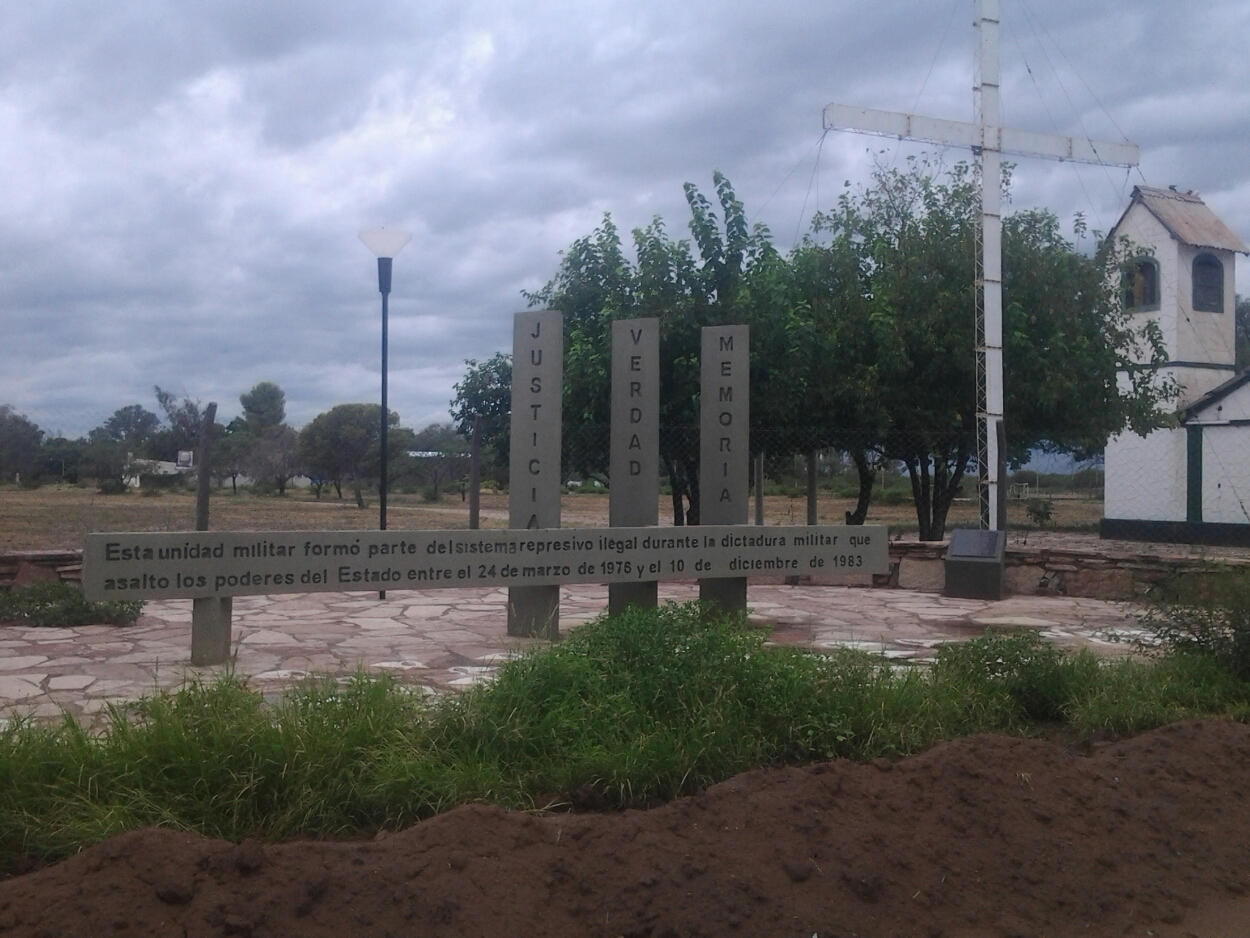
Historical marker telling posterity this military facility was unduly used as a black site by the military junta known as National Reorganization Process.

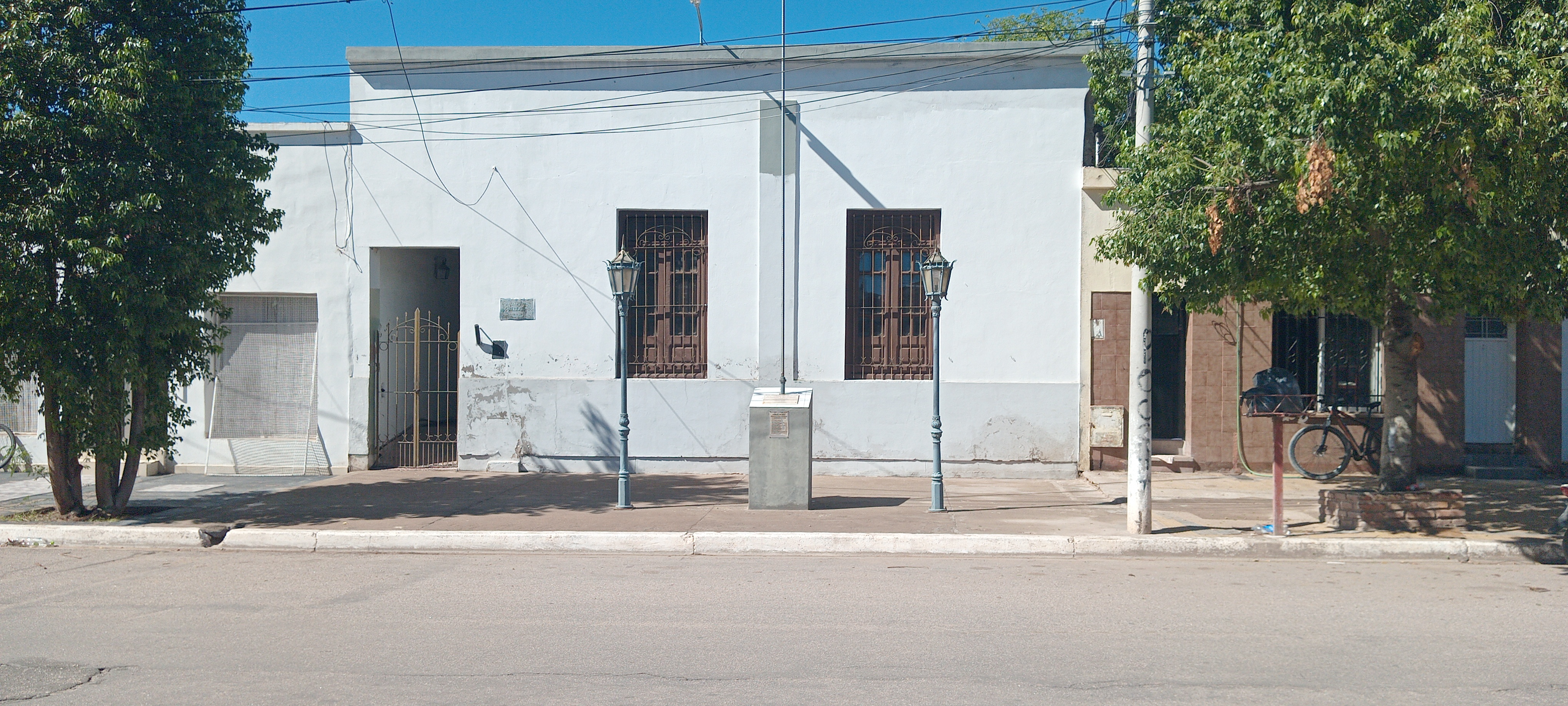
Mitre Book Club. Established in 1921.

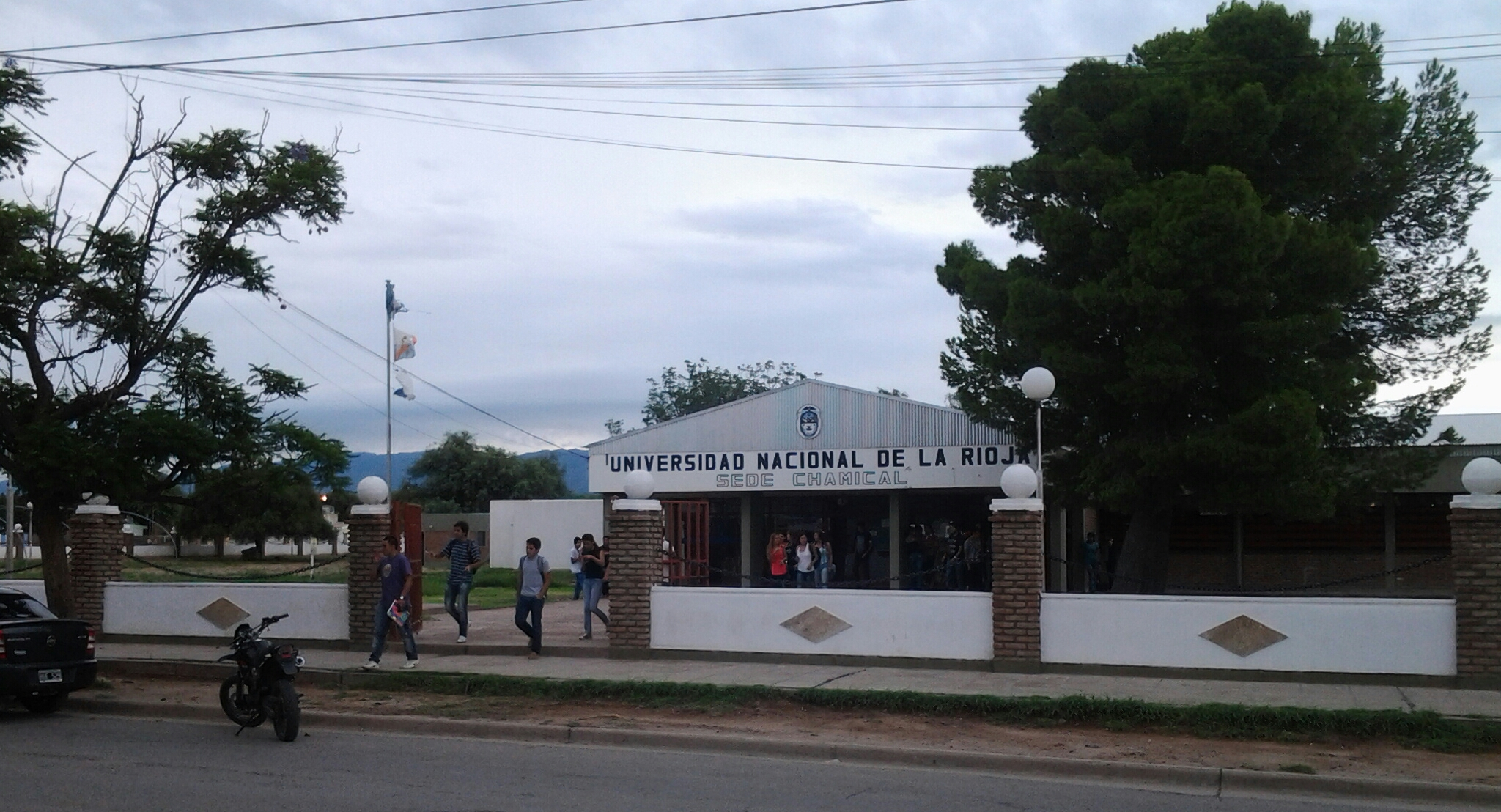
The University of La Rioja campus at Chamical finds itself on the south side of town. It attracts a number of students from across the country.

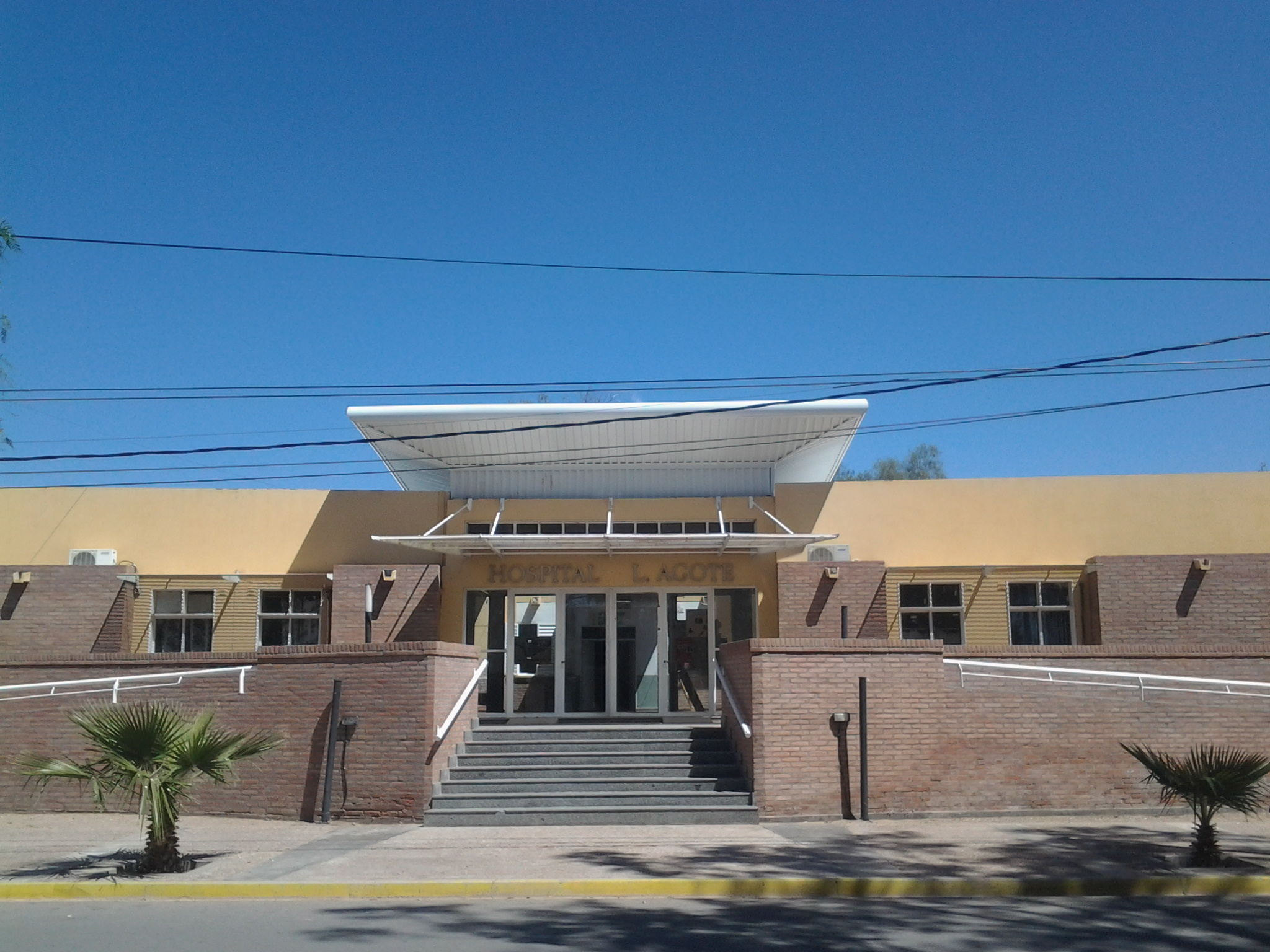
Façade of Hospital Luis Agote. This aging building is the main hospital of public assistance in the Llanos Riojanos. Its name commemorates Argentina's name physician Luis Agote.

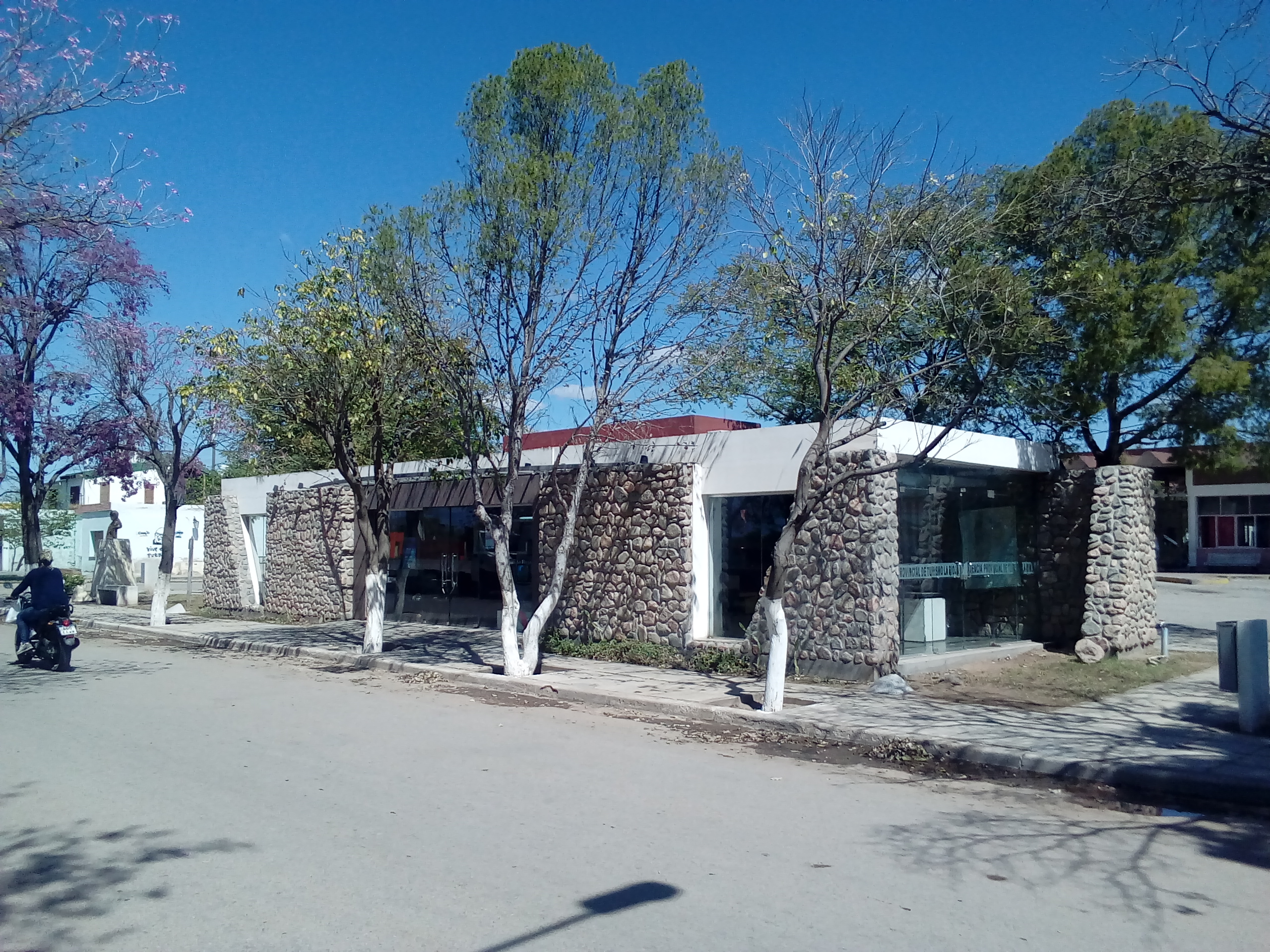
A mini attraction in its own right, the Chamical Tourist Information Center is located just off the Ruta 38 in the immediate surroundings of the local bus depot.
