= September 7 =

September 7 this year in various calendars
- Monday, 7 September 2026
Akan	Monodwo
Armenian	19 Hoṙi 1476
Aztec	Atemoztli 20, 7 Tōchtli
Babylonian	24 Abu, 2337 SE
Balinese pawukon	Luang, Pepet, Kajeng, Laba, Paing, Maulu, Coma of Menail, Indra, Dadi, Duka
Bengali	23 Bhadro, BS 1433
Chinese	Yang Wood Monkey・Net Mansion; Fire Horse Year, Month 7, Day 26 (Bailu, 16 days until Qiufen)
Common Era	7 September 2026 CE
Coptic	2 Nesi, AM 1742
Egyptian	24 Tybi, 2775 NE
Ethiopian	2 Pāguemēn, 2018 Amätä Məhrät
French Republican	Décade III, Primidi de Fructidor de l'Année 234 de la République
Gregorian	7 September, AD 2026
Hebrew	25 Elul, AM 5786
Hindu	Punarvasu・Vyatīpāta; Solar: 22 Bhādrapada, 1948 SE; Lunisolar: Ekādaśī, Kṛishna pakṣa of Śrāvaṇa, 2083 VE; Rāudra・5127 KY・1,872,825
Icelandic	Mánudagur, 14 Tvímánuður 2026
Islamic	24 Rabi' al-awwal, AH 1448 (using tabular method)
ISO week date	2026-W37-1
Japanese	26 Fumizuki, Reiwa 8 (Hakuro, 16 days until Shūbun)
Julian	25 August, AD 2026 (AM 7534)
Julian day	2461291
Korean	26 Wonsungidal, 4359 DE
Maya	13.0.13.16.8; 1 Chen, 7 Lamat
Roman	ante diem VIII Kalendas Septembres, MMDCCLXXIX AUC
Solar Hijri	16 Shahrivar, SH 1405
Tibetan	26 gro bzhin, me pho rta 2153 or 1772 or 1000

<<	September					>>
Su	Mo	Tu	We	Th	Fr	Sa
		1	2	3	4	5
6	7	8	9	10	11	12
13	14	15	16	17	18	19
20	21	22	23	24	25	26
27	28	29	30
2026

September 7 in recent years
2026 (Monday)
2025 (Sunday)
2024 (Saturday)
2023 (Thursday)
2022 (Wednesday)
2021 (Tuesday)
2020 (Monday)
2019 (Saturday)
2018 (Friday)
2017 (Thursday)

September 7 is the 250th day of the year (251st in leap years) in the Gregorian calendar; 115 days remain until the end of the year.

== Events ==
=== Pre-1600 ===
- 878 – Louis the Stammerer is crowned as king of West Francia by Pope John VIII.
- 1159 – Cardinal Rolando Bandinelli is elected Pope Alexander III, prompting the election of Cardinal Octaviano Monticelli as Antipope Victor IV the same day.
- 1191 – Third Crusade: Battle of Arsuf: Richard I of England defeats Saladin at Arsuf.
- 1228 – Holy Roman Emperor Frederick II lands in Acre, and starts the Sixth Crusade, which results in a peaceful restoration of the Kingdom of Jerusalem.
- 1303 – Guillaume de Nogaret takes Pope Boniface VIII prisoner on behalf of Philip IV of France.
- 1565 – Arrival of the so-called Grande Soccorso ("great relief") by Philip II of Spain to the Great Siege of Malta.
- 1571 – Thomas Howard, 4th Duke of Norfolk, is arrested for his role in the Ridolfi plot to assassinate Queen Elizabeth I of England and replace her with Mary, Queen of Scots.

=== 1601–1900 ===
- 1620 – The town of Kokkola (Swedish: Karleby) is founded by King Gustavus Adolphus of Sweden.
- 1625 – The Treaty of Southampton makes an alliance between England and the Dutch Republic against Spain.
- 1652 – Around 15,000 Han farmers and militia rebel against Dutch rule on Taiwan.
- 1695 – Henry Every perpetrates one of the most profitable pirate raids in history with the capture of the Grand Mughal ship Ganj-i-Sawai. In response, Emperor Aurangzeb threatens to end all English trading in India.
- 1706 – War of the Spanish Succession: Siege of Turin ends, leading to the withdrawal of French forces from North Italy.
- 1714 – The treaty of Baden between the kingdom of France and the Holy Roman Empire is ratified.
- 1736 – Following the Porteous Riots, a mob storms the Tolbooth prison in Edinburgh and lynches John Porteous.
- 1764 – Election of Stanisław August Poniatowski as the last ruler of the Polish–Lithuanian Commonwealth.
- 1776 – According to American colonial reports, Ezra Lee makes the world's first submarine attack in the Turtle, attempting to attach a time bomb to the hull of HMS Eagle in New York Harbor (no British records of this attack exist).
- 1778 – American Revolutionary War: France invades Dominica in the British West Indies, before Britain is even aware of France's involvement in the war.
- 1812 – French invasion of Russia: The Battle of Borodino, the bloodiest battle of the Napoleonic Wars, is fought near Moscow and results in a French victory.
- 1818 – Carl III of Sweden–Norway is crowned king of Norway, in Trondheim.
- 1822 – Dom Pedro I declares Brazil independent from Portugal on the shores of the Ipiranga Brook in São Paulo.
- 1856 – The Saimaa Canal is inaugurated.
- 1857 – Mountain Meadows massacre: Mormon settlers slaughter most members of a peaceful emigrant wagon train.
- 1860 – Unification of Italy: Giuseppe Garibaldi enters Naples.
- 1863 – American Civil War: Union troops under Quincy A. Gillmore capture Fort Wagner in Morris Island after a seven-week siege.
- 1864 – American Civil War: Atlanta is evacuated on orders of Union General William Tecumseh Sherman.
- 1876 – In Northfield, Minnesota, Jesse James and the James–Younger Gang attempt to rob the town's bank but are driven off by armed citizens.

=== 1901–present ===
- 1901 – The Boxer Rebellion in Qing dynasty (modern-day China) officially ends with the signing of the Boxer Protocol.
- 1903 – The Ottoman Empire launches a counter-offensive against the Strandzha Commune, which dissolves.
- 1906 – Alberto Santos-Dumont flies his 14-bis aircraft at Bagatelle, France successfully for the first time.
- 1907 – Cunard Line's RMS Lusitania sets sail on her maiden voyage from Liverpool, England, to New York City.
- 1909 – Eugène Lefebvre crashes a new French-built Wright biplane during a test flight at Port-Aviation (often called "Juvisy Airfield") at Viry-Châtillon, south of Paris, becoming the first aviator in the world to lose his life piloting a powered heavier-than-air craft.
- 1911 – French poet Guillaume Apollinaire is arrested and put in jail on suspicion of stealing the Mona Lisa from the Louvre museum.
- 1916 – US federal employees win the right to workers' compensation by Federal Employers Liability Act (39 Stat. 742; 5 U.S.C. 751).
- 1920 – Two newly purchased Savoia flying boats crash in the Swiss Alps en route to Finland where they were to serve with the Finnish Air Force, killing both crews.
- 1921 – In Atlantic City, New Jersey, the first Miss America Pageant, a two-day event, is held.
- 1921 – The Legion of Mary, the largest apostolic organization of lay people in the Catholic Church, is founded in Dublin, Ireland.
- 1923 – The International Criminal Police Organization (INTERPOL) is formed.
- 1927 – The first fully electronic television system is achieved by Philo Farnsworth.
- 1929 – Steamer Kuru capsizes and sinks on Lake Näsijärvi near Tampere in Finland. One hundred thirty-six lives are lost.
- 1932 – The Battle of Boquerón, the first major battle of the Chaco War, commences.
- 1936 – The last thylacine, a carnivorous marsupial, dies alone in its cage at the Hobart Zoo in Tasmania.
- 1940 – Romania returns Southern Dobruja to Bulgaria under the Treaty of Craiova.
- 1940 – World War II: The German Luftwaffe begins the Blitz, bombing London and other British cities for over 50 consecutive nights.
- 1942 – World War II: Japanese marines are forced to withdraw during the Battle of Milne Bay.
- 1943 – A fire at the Gulf Hotel in Houston kills 55 people.
- 1943 – World War II: The German 17th Army begins its evacuation of the Kuban bridgehead (Taman Peninsula) in southern Russia and moves across the Strait of Kerch to the Crimea.
- 1945 – World War II: Japanese forces on Wake Island, which they had held since December 1941, surrender to U.S. Marines.
- 1945 – The Berlin Victory Parade of 1945 is held.
- 1953 – Nikita Khrushchev is elected first secretary of the Communist Party of the Soviet Union.
- 1963 – The Pro Football Hall of Fame opens in Canton, Ohio with 17 charter members.
- 1965 – During an Indo-Pakistani War, China announces that it will reinforce its troops on the Indian border.
- 1965 – Vietnam War: In a follow-up to August's Operation Starlite, United States Marines and South Vietnamese forces initiate Operation Piranha on the Batangan Peninsula.
- 1970 – Fighting begins between Arab guerrillas and government forces in Jordan.
- 1970 – Vietnam Television is established.
- 1977 – The Torrijos–Carter Treaties between Panama and the United States on the status of the Panama Canal are signed. The United States agrees to transfer control of the canal to Panama at the end of the 20th century.
- 1977 – The 300-metre (980 ft) tall CKVR-DT transmission tower in Barrie, Ontario, Canada, is hit by a light aircraft in a fog, causing it to collapse. All aboard the aircraft are killed.
- 1978 – While walking across Waterloo Bridge in London, Bulgarian dissident Georgi Markov is assassinated by Bulgarian secret police agent Francesco Gullino by means of a ricin pellet fired from a specially designed umbrella.
- 1979 – The Chrysler Corporation asks the United States government for US$1.5 billion to avoid bankruptcy.
- 1984 – An explosion on board a Maltese patrol boat disposing of illegal fireworks at sea off Gozo kills seven soldiers and policemen.
- 1986 – Desmond Tutu becomes the first black man to lead the Anglican Diocese of Cape Town.
- 1986 – Chilean dictator Augusto Pinochet survives an assassination attempt by the FPMR; five of Pinochet's bodyguards are killed.
- 1995 – Space Shuttle Endeavour is launched on STS-69, the second flight of the Wake Shield Facility.
- 1997 – Maiden flight of the Lockheed Martin F-22 Raptor.
- 1999 – The 6.0 M_{w} Athens earthquake affects the area with a maximum Mercalli intensity of IX (Violent), killing 143, injuring 800–1,600, and leaving 50,000 homeless.
- 2005 – Egypt holds its first-ever multi-party presidential election.
- 2008 – The United States government takes control of the two largest mortgage financing companies in the US, Fannie Mae and Freddie Mac.
- 2010 – A Chinese fishing trawler collides with two Japanese Coast Guard patrol boats in disputed waters near the Senkaku Islands.
- 2011 – The Lokomotiv Yaroslavl plane crash in Russia kills 43 people, including nearly the entire roster of the Lokomotiv Yaroslavl Kontinental Hockey League team.
- 2012 – Canada officially cuts diplomatic ties with Iran by closing its embassy in Tehran and orders the expulsion of Iranian diplomats from Ottawa, over nuclear plans and purported human rights abuses.
- 2017 – The 8.2 M_{w} 2017 Chiapas earthquake strikes southern Mexico, killing at least 60 people.
- 2019 – Ukrainian filmmaker Oleg Sentsov and 66 others are released in a prisoner exchange between Ukraine and Russia.
- 2021 – Bitcoin becomes legal tender in El Salvador.
- 2021 – The National Unity Government of Myanmar declares a people's defensive war against the military junta during the Myanmar civil war.

== Births ==
=== Pre-1600 ===
- 923 – Suzaku, emperor of Japan (died 952)
- 1395 – Reginald West, 6th Baron De La Warr, English politician (died 1427)
- 1438 – Louis II, Landgrave of Lower Hesse (died 1471)
- 1448 – Henry, Count of Württemberg-Montbéliard (1473–1482) (died 1519)
- 1500 – Sebastian Newdigate, Carthusian monk and martyr (died 1535)
- 1524 – Thomas Erastus, Swiss physician and theologian (died 1583)
- 1533 – Elizabeth I of England (died 1603)

=== 1601–1900 ===
- 1629 – Sir John Perceval, 1st Baronet, Irish nobleman (died 1665)
- 1635 – Paul I, Prince Esterházy, Hungarian prince (died 1713)
- 1641 – Tokugawa Ietsuna, Japanese shōgun (died 1680)
- 1650 – Juan Manuel María de la Aurora, 8th duke of Escalona (died 1725)
- 1683 – Maria Anna of Austria (died 1754)
- 1694 – Johan Ludvig Holstein-Ledreborg, Danish Minister of State (died 1763)
- 1705 – Matthäus Günther, German painter (died 1788)
- 1707 – Georges-Louis Leclerc, Comte de Buffon, French mathematician, cosmologist, and author (died 1788)
- 1726 – François-André Danican Philidor, French chess player and composer (died 1795)
- 1740 – Johan Tobias Sergel, Swedish sculptor and illustrator (died 1814)
- 1777 – Heinrich Stölzel, German horn player and composer (died 1844)
- 1791 – Giuseppe Gioachino Belli, Italian poet and author (died 1863)
- 1795 – John William Polidori, English physician and author (died 1821)
- 1801 – Sarel Cilliers, South African preacher and activist (died 1871)
- 1803 – William Knibb, English Baptist minister and Jamaican missionary (died 1845)
- 1805 – Samuel Wilberforce, English bishop and one of the greatest public speakers of his day (debated T.H. Huxley) (died 1873)
- 1807 – Henry Sewell, English lawyer and politician, 1st Prime Minister of New Zealand (died 1879)
- 1810 – Hermann Heinrich Gossen, Prussian economist and academic (died 1858)
- 1813 – Emil Korytko, Polish activist and translator (died 1839)
- 1815 – John McDouall Stuart, Scottish explorer and surveyor (died 1866)
- 1818 – Thomas Talbot, American businessman and politician, 31st Governor of Massachusetts (died 1886)
- 1819 – Thomas A. Hendricks, American lawyer and politician, 21st Vice President of the United States (died 1885)
- 1829 – August Kekulé, German chemist and academic (died 1896)
- 1831 – Alexandre Falguière, French sculptor and painter (died 1900)
- 1836 – Henry Campbell-Bannerman, Scottish merchant and politician, Prime Minister of the United Kingdom (died 1908)
- 1836 – August Toepler, German physicist and academic (died 1912)
- 1842 – Johannes Zukertort, Polish-English chess player, linguist, and journalist (died 1888)
- 1851 – Edward Asahel Birge, American zoologist and academic (died 1950)
- 1855 – William Friese-Greene, English photographer, director, and cinematographer (died 1921)
- 1860 – Grandma Moses, American painter (died 1961)
- 1862 – Edgar Speyer, American-English financier and philanthropist (died 1932)
- 1866 – Tristan Bernard, French author and playwright (died 1947)
- 1867 – Albert Bassermann, German-Swiss actor (died 1952)
- 1867 – J. P. Morgan Jr., American banker and philanthropist (died 1943)
- 1869 – Ben Viljoen, South African general (died 1917)
- 1870 – Aleksandr Kuprin, Russian pilot, explorer, and author (died 1938)
- 1871 – George Hirst, English cricketer and coach (died 1954)
- 1874 – Samuel Rocke, Australian politician who served as an independent member of the Legislative Assembly of Western Australia (died 1963)
- 1875 – Edward Francis Hutton, American businessman and financier, co-founded E. F. Hutton & Co. (died 1962)
- 1876 – Francesco Buhagiar, Maltese politician, 2nd Prime Minister of Malta (died 1934)
- 1876 – C. J. Dennis, Australian poet and author (died 1938)
- 1879 – Francisco José of Bragança, exiled member of the Miguelist branch of the House of Bragança and officer in the Austro-Hungarian army (died 1919)
- 1883 – Theophrastos Sakellaridis, Greek composer and conductor (died 1950)
- 1885 – Elinor Wylie, American author and poet (died 1928)
- 1887 – Edith Sitwell, English poet and critic (died 1964)
- 1892 – Eric Harrison, Australian soldier and politician, 27th Australian Minister for Defence (died 1974)
- 1892 – Oscar O'Brien, Canadian priest, pianist, and composer (died 1958)
- 1893 – Leslie Hore-Belisha, English politician, Secretary of State for War (died 1957)
- 1894 – Vic Richardson, Australian cricketer, footballer, and sportscaster (died 1969)
- 1894 – George Waggner, American actor, director, and producer (died 1984)
- 1895 – Jacques Vaché, French author and poet (died 1919)
- 1897 – Al Sherman, Tin Pan Alley era songwriter (died 1973)
- 1900 – Taylor Caldwell, English-American author (died 1985)
- 1900 – Giuseppe Zangara, Italian-American assassin of Anton Cermak (died 1933)

=== 1901–present ===
- 1903 – Margaret Landon, American missionary and author (died 1993)
- 1903 – Dorothy Marie Donnelly, American poet and author (died 1994)
- 1904 – C. B. Colby, American author (died 1977)
- 1907 – Ahmed Adnan Saygun, Turkish composer and musicologist (died 1991)
- 1908 – Paul Brown, American football player and coach (died 1991)
- 1908 – Michael E. DeBakey, American surgeon and educator (died 2008)
- 1908 – Max Kaminsky, American trumpet player and bandleader (died 1994)
- 1909 – Elia Kazan, Greek-American actor, director, producer, and screenwriter (died 2003)
- 1911 – Todor Zhivkov, Bulgarian police officer and politician, Head of State of Bulgaria (died 1998)
- 1912 – David Packard, American engineer and businessman, co-founded Hewlett-Packard (died 1996)
- 1913 – Martin Charteris, Baron Charteris of Amisfield, English soldier and courtier (died 1999)
- 1913 – Anthony Quayle, English actor (died 1989)
- 1914 – Lída Baarová, Czech-Austrian actress (died 2000)
- 1914 – Graeme Bell, Australian pianist and composer (died 2012)
- 1914 – James Van Allen, American physicist and philosopher (died 2006)
- 1915 – Pedro Reginaldo Lira, Argentine bishop (died 2012)
- 1915 – Kiyosi Itô, Japanese mathematician and academic (died 2008)
- 1917 – Leonard Cheshire, English captain, pilot, and humanitarian (died 1992)
- 1917 – John Cornforth, Australian-English chemist and academic, Nobel Prize laureate (died 2013)
- 1917 – Jacob Lawrence, American painter and educator (died 2000)
- 1918 – Harold Amos, American microbiologist and academic (died 2003)
- 1919 – Briek Schotte, Belgian cyclist and coach (died 2004)
- 1920 – Al Caiola, American guitarist (Bonzanza theme) (died 2016)
- 1920 – Harri Webb, Welsh journalist and poet (died 1994)
- 1921 – Peter A. Peyser, American soldier and politician (died 2014)
- 1922 – Lucien Jarraud, French-Canadian journalist and radio host (died 2007)
- 1923 – Nancy Keesing, Australian author and poet (died 1993)
- 1923 – Peter Lawford, English-American actor (died 1984)
- 1923 – Louise Suggs, American golfer, co-founded LPGA (died 2015)
- 1924 – Daniel Inouye, American captain and politician, Medal of Honor recipient (died 2012)
- 1924 – Leonard Rosenman, American composer and conductor (died 2008)
- 1925 – Laura Ashley, Welsh-English fashion designer, founded Laura Ashley plc (died 1985)
- 1925 – Allan Blakeney, Canadian lawyer and politician, 10th Premier of Saskatchewan (died 2011)
- 1925 – Bhanumathi Ramakrishna, Indian actress, singer, director, and producer (died 2005)
- 1926 – Samuel Goldwyn Jr., American director and producer (died 2015)
- 1926 – Ronnie Gilbert, Bold-Voiced Singer With the Weavers (died 2015)
- 1926 – Donald J. Irwin, American lawyer and politician, 32nd Mayor of Norwalk (died 2013)
- 1926 – Patrick Jenkin, Baron Jenkin of Roding, English lawyer and politician, Secretary of State for the Environment (died 2016)
- 1926 – Erich Juskowiak, German footballer (died 1983)
- 1926 – Don Messick, American voice actor (died 1997)
- 1926 – Ed Warren, American paranormal investigator and author (died 2006)
- 1927 – Eric Hill, English-American author and illustrator (died 2014)
- 1927 – Claire L'Heureux-Dubé, Canadian lawyer and jurist
- 1928 – Kathleen Gorham, Australian ballerina (died 1983)
- 1928 – Al McGuire, American basketball player, coach, and commentator (died 2001)
- 1929 – Clyde Lovellette, American basketball player (died 2016)
- 1930 – Baudouin of Belgium (died 1993)
- 1930 – Sonny Rollins, American saxophonist and composer (died 2026)
- 1930 – S. Sivanayagam, Sri Lankan journalist and author (died 2010)
- 1930 – Yuan Longping, Academician of the Chinese Academy of Engineering and an expert in hybrid rice (died 2021)
- 1931 – Charles Camilleri, Maltese composer and conductor (died 2009)
- 1932 – Malcolm Bradbury, English author and academic (died 2000)
- 1932 – John Paul Getty Jr., American-English philanthropist and book collector (died 2003)
- 1934 – Mary Bauermeister, German painter and illustrator (died 2023)
- 1934 – Waldo de los Ríos, Argentine composer and conductor (died 1977)
- 1934 – Sunil Gangopadhyay, Indian author and poet (died 2012)
- 1934 – Omar Karami, Lebanese lawyer and politician, 58th Prime Minister of Lebanon (died 2015)
- 1934 – Little Milton, American singer and guitarist (died 2005)
- 1934 – Hilpas Sulin, Finnish ice hockey player and coach (died 2025)
- 1935 – Abdou Diouf, Senegalese lawyer and politician, 2nd President of Senegal
- 1935 – Dick O'Neal, American basketball player and dentist (died 2013)
- 1936 – George Cassidy, Northern Irish jazz musician and music teacher (died 2023)
- 1936 – Brian Hart, English race car driver and engineer, founded Brian Hart Ltd. (died 2014)
- 1936 – Buddy Holly, American singer-songwriter and guitarist (died 1959)
- 1936 – Apostolos Kaklamanis, Greek lawyer and politician, Greek Minister of Justice
- 1937 – John Phillip Law, American actor (died 2008)
- 1937 – Oleg Lobov, Russian politician, Premier of the Russian SFSR (died 2018)
- 1939 – Latimore, American singer-songwriter and pianist (died 2026)
- 1939 – Peter Gill, Welsh actor, director, and playwright (died 2026)
- 1940 – Dario Argento, Italian director, producer, and screenwriter
- 1940 – Abdurrahman Wahid, Indonesian journalist and politician, 4th President of Indonesia (died 2009)
- 1942 – Billy Best, Scottish footballer
- 1942 – Alan Oakes, English footballer and manager
- 1942 – Andrew Stone, Baron Stone of Blackheath, English businessman and politician
- 1942 – Jonathan H. Turner, American sociologist
- 1943 – Gloria Gaynor, American singer-songwriter
- 1943 – Beverley McLachlin, Canadian lawyer and jurist, 17th Chief Justice of Canada
- 1943 – Joe Simon, American singer-songwriter and producer, and preacher (died 2021)
- 1944 – Forrest Blue, American football player (died 2011)
- 1944 – Bertel Haarder, Danish lawyer and politician, Education Minister of Denmark
- 1944 – Peter Larter, English rugby player
- 1944 – Earl Manigault, American basketball player and coach (died 1998)
- 1944 – Bora Milutinović, Serbian footballer and manager
- 1944 – Houshang Moradi Kermani, Iranian author
- 1945 – Jacques Lemaire, Canadian ice hockey player and coach
- 1945 – Vic Pollard, English-New Zealand rugby player and footballer
- 1945 – Peter Storey, English footballer
- 1947 – Sergio Della Pergola, Israeli demographer and statistician
- 1948 – Susan Blakely, American actress
- 1949 – Barry Siegel, American journalist and academic
- 1950 – Julie Kavner, American actress
- 1950 – Peggy Noonan, American author, journalist, speechwriter, and pundit
- 1951 – Chrissie Hynde, American singer-songwriter and guitarist
- 1951 – Morris Albert, Brazilian singer-songwriter
- 1951 – Mark Isham, American trumpet player and composer
- 1951 – Mammootty, Indian actor and producer
- 1952 – Ricardo Tormo, Spanish motorcycle racer (died 1998)
- 1953 – Marc Hunter, New Zealand-Australian singer-songwriter (died 1998)
- 1953 – Benmont Tench, American keyboardist and songwriter
- 1954 – Corbin Bernsen, American actor
- 1954 – Michael Emerson, American actor
- 1954 – Kerrie Holley, American software architect and academic
- 1955 – Mira Furlan, Croatian-American actress (died 2021)
- 1955 – Efim Zelmanov, Russian-American mathematician known for his work in combinatorial group theory
- 1956 – Michael Feinstein, American singer and pianist
- 1956 – Byron Stevenson, Welsh footballer (died 2007)
- 1956 – Diane Warren, American songwriter
- 1957 – Jermaine Stewart, American singer-songwriter and dancer (died 1997)
- 1959 – Drew Weissman, Nobel Prize winning American physician and immunologist known for his contributions to RNA biology
- 1960 – Brad Houser, American bass player (died 2023)
- 1960 – Ersin Tatar, Turkish Cypriot politician
- 1961 – LeRoi Moore, American saxophonist and songwriter (died 2008)
- 1961 – Jean-Yves Thibaudet, French pianist
- 1962 – Jennifer Egan, American novelist and short story writer
- 1962 – George South, American wrestler
- 1962 – Hasan Vezir, Turkish footballer and manager
- 1963 – Neerja Bhanot, Indian flight purser
- 1963 – W. Earl Brown, American actor
- 1964 – Eazy-E, American rapper and producer (died 1995)
- 1965 – Angela Gheorghiu, Romanian soprano
- 1965 – Darko Pančev, Macedonian footballer
- 1965 – Uta Pippig, German runner
- 1965 – Tomáš Skuhravý, Czech footballer
- 1965 – Andreas Thom, German footballer and manager
- 1966 – Vladimir Andreyev, Russian race walker
- 1966 – Toby Jones, English actor
- 1966 – Gunda Niemann-Stirnemann, German speed skater
- 1967 – Leslie Jones, American comedian and actress
- 1967 – Alok Sharma, Indian-English accountant and politician
- 1968 – Marcel Desailly, Ghanaian-French footballer
- 1968 – Gennadi Krasnitski, Russian figure skater and coach
- 1969 – Angie Everhart, American actress and model
- 1969 – Diane Farr, American actress
- 1969 – Rudy Galindo, American figure skater
- 1970 – Monique Gabriela Curnen, American actress
- 1970 – Gino Odjick, Canadian ice hockey player (died 2023)
- 1970 – Tom Everett Scott, American actor
- 1971 – Gene Pritsker, American composer
- 1971 – Shane Mosley, American boxer and trainer
- 1972 – Jason Isringhausen, American baseball player and coach
- 1973 – Shannon Elizabeth, American model and actress
- 1973 – Alex Kurtzman, American director, producer, and screenwriter
- 1974 – Mario Frick, Swiss-Liechtensteiner footballer
- 1974 – Antonio McDyess, American basketball player
- 1975 – Norifumi Abe, Japanese motorcycle racer (died 2007)
- 1975 – Harold Wallace, Costa Rican footballer and manager
- 1976 – Wavell Hinds, Jamaican cricketer
- 1976 – Oliver Hudson, American actor
- 1977 – Mateen Cleaves, American basketball player
- 1977 – Molly Holly, American wrestler and trainer
- 1978 – Matt Cooke, Canadian ice hockey player
- 1978 – Erwin Koen, Dutch footballer
- 1978 – Ersin Güreler, Turkish footballer
- 1978 – Devon Sawa, Canadian actor
- 1979 – Nathan Hindmarsh, Australian rugby league player and sportscaster
- 1979 – Paul Mara, American ice hockey player
- 1979 – Owen Pallett, Canadian singer-songwriter and keyboard player
- 1979 – Brian Stokes, American baseball player
- 1980 – Emre Belözoğlu, Turkish footballer
- 1980 – Sara Carrigan, Australian cyclist
- 1980 – Gabriel Milito, Argentine footballer
- 1980 – Javad Nekounam, Iranian footballer
- 1980 – J. D. Pardo, American actor
- 1981 – Gökhan Zan, Turkish footballer
- 1982 – Andre Dirrell, American boxer
- 1982 – George Bailey, Australian cricketer
- 1982 – Emese Szász, Hungarian fencer
- 1983 – Philip Deignan, Irish cyclist
- 1983 – Annette Dytrt, German figure skater
- 1983 – Pops Mensah-Bonsu, English-American basketball player
- 1983 – Piri Weepu, New Zealand rugby player
- 1984 – Ben Hollingsworth, Canadian actor
- 1984 – Farveez Maharoof, Sri Lankan cricketer
- 1984 – Miranda, Brazilian footballer
- 1984 – Vera Zvonareva, Russian tennis player
- 1984 – Pelin Karahan, Turkish actress
- 1985 – Radhika Apte, Indian actress
- 1985 – Wade Davis, American baseball player
- 1985 – Alyssa Diaz, American actress
- 1985 – Adam Eckersley, English footballer
- 1985 – Eric Fehr, Canadian ice hockey player
- 1985 – Rafinha, Brazilian footballer
- 1986 – Charlie Daniels, English footballer
- 1986 – Colin Delaney, American wrestler
- 1987 – Tommy Elphick, English footballer
- 1987 – Sammy Moore, English footballer
- 1987 – Danny North, English footballer
- 1987 – Patrick Robinson, American football player
- 1987 – Evan Rachel Wood, American actress and singer
- 1987 – Aleksandra Wozniak, Canadian tennis player
- 1988 – Alex Harvey, Canadian skier
- 1988 – Kevin Love, American basketball player
- 1989 – Jonathan Majors, American actor
- 1990 – Libor Hudáček, Slovak ice hockey player
- 1990 – Fedor Klimov, Russian figure skater
- 1991 – Dale Finucane, Australian rugby league player
- 1991 – Amar Garibović, Serbian skier (died 2010)
- 1991 – Lee Jung-hwan, South Korean professional golfe
- 1992 – Miniminter, English YouTuber
- 1994 – Elinor Barker, Welsh track cyclist
- 1994 – Maren Lundby, Norwegian former ski jumper
- 1994 – Aya Jones, French model
- 1994 – Nerea Gantxegi, Spanish footballer
- 1994 – Claire Lejeune, French politician
- 1994 – Jenna McCormick, Australian soccer and Australian Rules Football player
- 1994 – Isel Suñiga, Guatemalan politician
- 1994 – Eva Buurman, Dutch professional racing cyclist
- 1994 – Irina Fetisova, Russian volleyball player
- 1994 – Herman Ese'ese, New Zealand rugby league player
- 1994 – Tom Opacic, Australian rugby league player
- 1994 – Kento Yamazaki, Japanese actor
- 1996 – Donovan Mitchell, American basketball player
- 1997 – Dean-Charles Chapman, English actor
- 1999 – Gracie Abrams, American singer-songwriter
- 1999 – Laurie Jussaume, Canadian cyclist
- 2000 – Ariarne Titmus, Australian swimmer
- 2004 – Tsugumi Aritomo, Japanese entertainer
- 2006 – Ian Chen, American actor

== Deaths ==
=== Pre-1600 ===
- 251 – Sima Yi, Chinese general and politician (born 179)
- 355 – Claudius Silvanus, Roman general
- 859 – Emperor Xuānzong of Tang, Chinese emperor (born 810)
- 934 – Meng Zhixiang, Chinese general (born 874)
- 1134 – Alfonso the Battler, Spanish emperor (born 1073)
- 1151 – Geoffrey Plantagenet, Count of Anjou (born 1113)
- 1202 – William of the White Hands, French cardinal (born 1135)
- 1251 – Viola, Duchess of Opole
- 1303 – Gregory Bicskei, archbishop of Esztergom
- 1312 – Ferdinand IV of Castile (born 1285)
- 1354 – Andrea Dandolo, doge of Venice (born 1306)
- 1362 – Joan of the Tower (born 1321)
- 1464 – Frederick II, Elector of Saxony (born 1412)
- 1496 – Ferdinand II of Naples (born 1469)
- 1559 – Robert Estienne, English-French printer and scholar (born 1503)
- 1566 – Nikola Šubić Zrinski, Croatian general (born 1506)
- 1573 – Joanna of Austria, Princess of Portugal (born 1535)

=== 1601–1900 ===
- 1601 – John Shakespeare, father of William Shakespeare (born 1529)
- 1619 – Melchior Grodziecki, Polish priest and saint (born 1582)
- 1619 – Marko Krizin, Croatian priest, missionary, and saint (born 1589)
- 1622 – Denis Godefroy, French lawyer and jurist (born 1549)
- 1626 – Edward Villiers, English noble and politician (born c. 1585)
- 1644 – Guido Bentivoglio, Italian cardinal and historian (born 1579)
- 1655 – François Tristan l'Hermite, French author and playwright (born 1601)
- 1657 – Arvid Wittenberg, Swedish field marshal (born 1606)
- 1685 – William Carpenter, English-American settler, co-founded Rhode Island and Providence Plantations (born 1605)
- 1729 – William Burnet, Dutch-American civil servant and politician, 21st Governor of the province of New York (born 1688)
- 1741 – Blas de Lezo, Spanish admiral (born 1689)
- 1798 – Peter Frederik Suhm, Danish-Norwegian historian and author (born 1728)
- 1799 – Louis-Guillaume Le Monnier, French botanist and physicist (born 1717)
- 1809 – Buddha Yodfa Chulaloke, Thai king (born 1737)
- 1833 – Hannah More, English poet, playwright, and philanthropist (born 1745)
- 1840 – Jacques MacDonald, French general (born 1765)
- 1871 – Kimenzan Tanigorō, Japanese sumo wrestler, the 13th Yokozuna (born 1826)
- 1871 – Mehmed Emin Âli Pasha, Ottoman politician, 217th Grand Vizier of the Ottoman Empire (born 1815)
- 1881 – Sidney Lanier, American poet and academic (born 1842)
- 1891 – Lorenzo Sawyer, American lawyer and judge (born 1820)
- 1892 – John Greenleaf Whittier, American poet and activist (born 1807)
- 1893 – Hamilton Fish, American lawyer and politician, 26th United States Secretary of State (born 1808)

=== 1901–present ===
- 1907 – Bogdan Petriceicu Hasdeu, Romanian philologist, journalist, and playwright (born 1838)
- 1910 – William Holman Hunt, English painter (born 1827)
- 1920 – Simon-Napoléon Parent, Canadian lawyer and politician, 12th Premier of Quebec (born 1855)
- 1921 – Alfred William Rich, English author and painter (born 1856)
- 1929 – Frederic Weatherly, English lawyer, author, and songwriter (born 1848)
- 1933 – Edward Grey, 1st Viscount Grey of Fallodon, English ornithologist and politician, Secretary of State for Foreign and Commonwealth Affairs (born 1862)
- 1939 – Kyōka Izumi, Japanese author, poet, and playwright (born 1873)
- 1940 – José Félix Estigarribia, Paraguayan soldier and politician, President of Paraguay (born 1888)
- 1941 – Mario García Menocal, Cuban lawyer and politician, President of Cuba (born 1866)
- 1942 – Cecilia Beaux, American painter and academic (born 1855)
- 1943 – Mary Karadja, Swedish writer, spiritualist and princess (born 1868)
- 1949 – José Clemente Orozco, Mexican painter and illustrator (born 1883)
- 1951 – Maria Montez, Dominican-French actress (born 1912)
- 1951 – John French Sloan, American painter and etcher (born 1871)
- 1954 – Bud Fisher, American cartoonist (born 1885)
- 1956 – C. B. Fry, English cricketer, academic, and politician (born 1872)
- 1959 – Maurice Duplessis, Canadian lawyer and politician, 16th Premier of Quebec (born 1890)
- 1960 – Wilhelm Pieck, German carpenter and politician, President of East Germany (born 1873)
- 1961 – Pieter Sjoerds Gerbrandy, Dutch lawyer, jurist, and politician, 34th Prime Minister of the Netherlands (born 1885)
- 1962 – Karen Blixen, Danish memoirist and short story writer (born 1885)
- 1962 – Graham Walker, English motorcycle racer and journalist (born 1897)
- 1964 – Walter A. Brown, American businessman (born 1905)
- 1969 – Everett Dirksen, American lieutenant and politician (born 1896)
- 1970 – Yitzhak Gruenbaum, Polish-Israeli journalist and politician, 1st Internal Affairs Minister of Israel (born 1879)
- 1971 – Spring Byington, American actress (born 1886)
- 1971 – Ludwig Suthaus, German tenor (born 1906)
- 1972 – Dimitris Poulianos, Greek painter and illustrator (born 1899)
- 1973 – Lev Vladimirsky, Kazakhstani-Russian admiral (born 1903)
- 1974 – S. M. Rasamanickam, Ceylon politician (born 1913)
- 1978 – Cecil Aronowitz, South African-English viola player (born 1916)
- 1978 – Keith Moon, English drummer (The Who) (born 1946)
- 1979 – I. A. Richards, English literary critic and rhetorician (born 1893)
- 1981 – Christy Brown, Irish author, poet, and painter (born 1932)
- 1983 – Tamurbek Dawletschin, Tatar author and prisoner of war (born 1904)
- 1984 – Joe Cronin, American baseball player and manager (born 1906)
- 1984 – Josyf Slipyj, Ukrainian cardinal (born 1892)
- 1984 – Don Tallon, Australian cricketer (born 1916)
- 1985 – Jacoba van Velde, Dutch author (born 1903)
- 1985 – José Zabala-Santos, Filipino cartoonist (born 1911)
- 1986 – Les Bury, English-Australian public servant and politician, 26th Australian Minister for Foreign Affairs (born 1913)
- 1988 – Sedad Hakkı Eldem, Turkish architect (born 1908)
- 1989 – Mikhail Goldstein, Ukrainian violinist and composer (born 1917)
- 1990 – Earle E. Partridge, American general and pilot (born 1900)
- 1990 – A. J. P. Taylor, English historian and journalist (born 1906)
- 1991 – Edwin McMillan, American physicist and chemist, Nobel Prize laureate (born 1907)
- 1994 – Eric Crozier, English director and playwright (born 1914)
- 1994 – Dennis Morgan, American actor (born 1908)
- 1994 – Terence Young, Chinese-English director and screenwriter (born 1915)
- 1995 – Russell Johnson, American cartoonist (born 1893)
- 1996 – Bibi Besch, Austrian-American actress (born 1942)
- 1997 – Mobutu Sese Seko, Congolese soldier and politician, President of Zaire (born 1930)
- 2000 – Bruce Gyngell, Australian-English broadcaster (born 1929)
- 2001 – Igor Buketoff, American conductor and educator (born 1915)
- 2001 – Spede Pasanen, Finnish film director and producer, comedian, and inventor (born 1930)
- 2001 – Billie Lou Watt, American actress and voice artist (born 1924)
- 2002 – Uziel Gal, German-Israeli colonel and gun designer, designed the Uzi (born 1923)
- 2003 – Warren Zevon, American singer-songwriter (born 1947)
- 2008 – Ilarion Ciobanu, Romanian rugby player and actor (born 1931)
- 2008 – Nagi Noda, Japanese director and producer (born 1973)
- 2010 – Amar Garibović, Serbian skier (born 1991)
- 2010 – William H. Goetzmann, American historian and author (born 1930)
- 2010 – John Kluge, German-American businessman (born 1914)
- 2010 – Glenn Shadix, American actor (born 1952)
- 2011 – Victims of the 2011 Lokomotiv Yaroslavl plane crash:
  - Pavol Demitra, Slovak ice hockey player (born 1974)
  - Alexander Karpovtsev, Russian ice hockey player and coach (born 1970)
  - Igor Korolev, Russian ice hockey player and coach (born 1970)
  - Stefan Liv, Polish-Swedish ice hockey player (born 1980)
  - Jan Marek, Czech ice hockey player (born 1979)
  - Brad McCrimmon, Canadian ice hockey player and coach (born 1959)
  - Karel Rachůnek, Czech ice hockey player (born 1979)
  - Kārlis Skrastiņš, Latvian ice hockey player (born 1974)
  - Ruslan Salei, Belarusian ice hockey player (born 1974)
  - Josef Vašíček, Czech ice hockey player (born 1980)
- 2012 – César Fernández Ardavín, Spanish director and screenwriter (born 1923)
- 2012 – Aleksandr Maksimenkov, Russian footballer and manager (born 1952)
- 2013 – Albert Allen Bartlett, American physicist and academic (born 1923)
- 2013 – Romesh Bhandari, Pakistani-Indian politician and diplomat, 13th Foreign Secretary of India (born 1928)
- 2013 – Frank Blevins, English-Australian politician, 7th Deputy Premier of South Australia (born 1939)
- 2013 – Ilja Hurník, Czech playwright and composer (born 1922)
- 2014 – Kwon Ri-se, South Korean singer (born 1991)
- 2014 – Raul M. Gonzalez, Filipino lawyer and politician, 42nd Filipino Secretary of Justice (born 1930)
- 2014 – Yoshiko Ōtaka, Chinese-Japanese actress, singer, and politician (born 1920)
- 2015 – Guillermo Rubalcaba, Cuban pianist, composer, and bandleader (born 1927)
- 2015 – Voula Zouboulaki, Greek actress (born 1924)
- 2018 – Pedro Jirón, Nicaraguan footballer (born 1939)
- 2018 – Mac Miller, American rapper (born 1992)
- 2023 – Wanda Janicka, Polish architect, participant in the Warsaw Uprising (born 1923)
- 2024 – Dan Morgenstern, German-American jazz writer and editor (born 1929)

== Holidays and observances ==
- Air Force Day (Pakistan)
- Christian feast day:
  - Anastasius the Fuller
  - Clodoald
  - Blessed Giovanni Battista Mazzucconi
  - Gratus of Aosta
  - Stephen Pongracz
  - Blessed Maria Angela Picco
  - Marko Krizin
  - Regina
  - Blessed Thomas Tsugi
  - September 7 (Eastern Orthodox liturgics)
- Constitution Day (Fiji)
- Independence Day (Brazil), celebrates the independence of Brazil from Portugal in 1822.
- Military Intelligence Day (Ukraine)
- National Threatened Species Day (Australia)
- Victory Day (Mozambique)
