= Paris's 8th constituency =

Constituency of the National Assembly of France

8th constituency of Paris
- inline Constituency of the National Assembly of France

- Paris, showing its post 2012 legislative constituencies
- Deputy: Éva Sas; EELV
- Department: Paris
- Registered voters: 82,164

The 8th constituency of Paris (French: Huitième circonscription de Paris) is a French legislative constituency in the Paris département (75). Like the other 576 French constituencies, it elects one MP using the two-round system. Its boundaries were heavily redrawn in 1988 and 2012.

8th constituency of Paris
- inline Constituency of the National Assembly of France

- Paris, showing its legislative constituencies between 1988 and 2012
- Member: constituency abolished, 2012
- Department: Paris

Map of Paris constituencies in 1981.

== Historic representation ==
Election	Member	Party	Source
1958	Jean-Charles Lepidi	UNR	
1962	Jean-Charles Lepidi	UNR	
1967	Jean-Charles Lepidi	UDR	
1968	Claude-Gérard Marcus	UDR	
1973	Claude-Gérard Marcus	UDR	
1978	Claude-Gérard Marcus	RPR	
1981	Claude-Gérard Marcus	RPR	
1986	Proportional representation - no election by constituency		
1988	Pierre de Bénouville	RPR	
1993	Jean de Gaulle	RPR	
1997	Jean de Gaulle	RPR	
2002	Jean de Gaulle	UMP	
2007	Sandrine Mazetier	PS	
2012	Sandrine Mazetier	PS	
2017	Laetitia Avia	LREM	
2022	Éva Sas	EELV	

== Election results ==
=== 2024 ===
Candidate	Party	Alliance	First round			Second round		
Candidate	Party	Alliance	Votes	%	+/–	Votes	%	+/–
Éva Sas	LÉ	NFP	30,923	50.73	+5.95			
David Ouzilou	RE	ENS	17,305	28.39	+0.45			
Vanessa Vicente	DIV		7,084	11.62	N/A			
Florent Brunetti	LR		3,210	5.27	-6.03			
Pierre-Louis Giscard d'Estaing	UDI		960	1.57	N/A			
Jannick Trunkenwald	REC		688	1.13	-3.26			
Anne Bernon	LO		317	0.52	-0.03			
Christine Vial Kayser	DIV		280	0.48	N/A			
Camille Adoue	EXG		176	0.29	N/A			
Manuel Lutz	DIV		19	0.03	N/A			
Gwenolé Selles	EXG		0	0.00	N/A			
N'Cho Xavier Lawson-Agban	DIV		0	0.00	N/A			
Valid votes			60,962	98.54	+0.01			
Blank votes			625	1.01	-0.05			
Null votes			280	0.45	+0.04			
Turnout			61,867	72.53	+16.89			
Abstentions			23,430	27.47	-16.89			
Registered voters			85,297					
Source: Ministry of the Interior, Le Monde
Result						LÉ HOLD		

=== 2022 ===
Legislative Election 2022: Paris's 8th constituency
Party	Candidate	Votes	%	±%
EELV (NUPÉS)	Éva Sas	19,490	41.70	+7.45
LREM (Ensemble)	Laetitia Avia	13,059	27.94	-11.65
LR (UDC)	Valérie Montandon	5,282	11.30	−4.13
RN	Vanessa Lancelot	2,165	4.63	+0.94
REC	Jannick Trunkenwald	2,051	4.39	N/A
DVG	Marie-Claude Giraud	1,441	3.08	N/A
DVE	Nezha Kobbi	976	2.09	N/A
Others	N/A	2,276		
Turnout		47,438	55.64	−1.93
2nd round result
EELV (NUPÉS)	Éva Sas	23,824	54.08	N/A
LREM (Ensemble)	Laetitia Avia	20,228	45.92	−18.64
Turnout		44,052	54.43	+8.22
EELV gain from LREM				

=== 2017 ===
Legislative Election 2017: Paris's 8th constituency
Party	Candidate	Votes	%	±%
LREM	Laetitia Avia	18,545	39.59	N/A
LR	Valérie Montandon	7,227	15.43	−10.32
PS	Sandrine Mazetier	6,964	14.87	−27.55
LFI	Clément Bony	6,278	13.40	N/A
EELV	Emmanuelle Pierre-Marie	2,803	5.98	+0.72
FN	Renée-Michelle Thimotte	1,729	3.69	−2.46
Others	N/A	3,295		
Turnout		47,302	57.57	−2.96
2nd round result
LREM	Laetitia Avia	21,336	64.56	N/A
LR	Valérie Montandon	11,710	35.44	−2.96
Turnout		37,967	46.21	−11.52
LREM gain from PS		Swing		

=== 2012 ===
Legislative Election 2012: Paris's 8th constituency
Party	Candidate	Votes	%	±%
PS	Sandrine Mazetier	20,565	42.42	+8.88
UMP	Charles Beigbeder	12,481	25.75	−10.01
FG	Alexis Corbière	3,775	7.79	+5.54
FN	Christian Vauge	2,979	6.15	+3.68
EELV	Christophe Najdovski	2,549	5.26	+1.59
DVD	Franck Margain	1,841	3.80	N/A
MoDem	Jean-Marie Taphoureau	1,593	3.29	−9.02
Others	N/A	2,693		
Turnout		48,476	60.53	−5.18
2nd round result
PS	Sandrine Mazetier	28,473	61.60	+5.75
UMP	Charles Beigbeder	17,749	38.40	−5.75
Turnout		46,222	57.73	−6.63
PS hold				

=== 2007 ===
Elections between 1988 and 2007 were based on the 1988 boundaries.

Map of Paris Constituencies, 1988-2007 elections

Legislative Election 2007: Paris's 8th constituency
Party	Candidate	Votes	%	±%
UMP	Arno Klarsfeld	16,487	35.76	
PS	Sandrine Mazetier	15,463	33.54	
MoDem	Jean-François Pernin	5,673	12.31	
LV	Pénélope Komitès	1,693	3.67	
FN	Philippe Coulnecheff	1,140	2.47	
PCF	Nicolas Bonnet	1,036	2.25	
Others	N/A	4,608		
Turnout		46,541	65.71	
2nd round result
PS	Sandrine Mazetier	24,783	55.85	
UMP	Arno Klarsfeld	19,588	44.15	
Turnout		45,580	64.36	
PS gain from UMP				

=== 2002 ===
Legislative Election 2002: Paris's 8th constituency
Party	Candidate	Votes	%	±%
LV	Maryse Arditi	15,101	33.63	
UMP	Jean de Gaulle	12,748	28.39	
DVD	Jean-Pierre Bechter	8,567	19.08	
FN	Pierre Legaud	2,762	6.15	
PCF	Michèle Camous	906	2.02	
Others	N/A	4,825		
Turnout		45,485	70.85	
2nd round result
UMP	Jean de Gaulle	21,681	52.20	
LV	Maryse Arditi	19,857	47.80	
Turnout		42,876	66.80	
UMP hold				

=== 1997 ===
Legislative Election 1997: Paris's 8th constituency
Party	Candidate	Votes	%	±%
PS	Sandrine Mazetier	10,247	25.86	
RPR	Jean de Gaulle	9,285	23.43	
RPR	Jean-Pierre Bechter*	6,497	16.39	
FN	Stéphane Téot	4,134	10.43	
PCF	José Espinosa	2,288	5.77	
LV	Christophe Najdovski	1,577	3.98	
LO	Gérard Chauvin	954	2.41	
DVD	Pascale de Laugun	851	2.15	
Others	N/A	3,798		
Turnout		40,820	64.41	
2nd round result
RPR	Jean de Gaulle	22,050	52.81	
PS	Sandrine Mazetier	19,707	47.19	
Turnout		43,584	68.79	
RPR hold				

* RPR dissident
