= Essonne's 7th constituency =

Constituency of the National Assembly of France

7th constituency of Essonne
- inline Constituency of the National Assembly of France

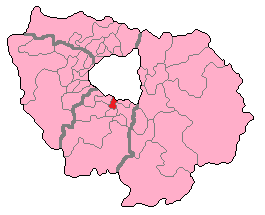
- Essonne's 7th Constituency shown within Île-de-France
- Deputy: Robin Reda; RE
- Department: Essonne
- Cantons: Viry-Châtillon, Athis-Mons, Juvisy-sur-Orge, Savigny-sur-Orge
- Registered voters: 73,663

The 7th constituency of Essonne is a French legislative constituency in the Essonne département.

== Description ==
The 7th constituency of Essonne is a suburban seat in the north of the department bordering Val-de-Marne. The seat was created in 1988 as the number of seats in Essonne was increased from four to ten.

The victory of Éva Sas of EELV at the 2012 elections was the first time the left had won the seat in a general election since the 1988 election.

== Historic Representation ==
Election	Member	Party
1988	Marie-Noëlle Lienemann	PS
1992	Jean-Claude Ramos	PS
1993	Jean Marsaudon	RPR
1997	Jean Marsaudon	RPR
2002	Jean Marsaudon	UMP
2007	Jean Marsaudon	UMP
2008	Françoise Briand	UMP
2012	Éva Sas	EELV
2017	Robin Reda	LR
2022	Robin Reda	RE

== Election results ==
=== 2024 ===
Candidate	Party	Alliance	First round			Second round		
Candidate	Party	Alliance	Votes	%	+/–	Votes	%	+/–
Claire Lejeune	LFI	NFP	19,012	40.83	+5.80	20,780	44.31	-5.35
Robin Reda	RE	ENS	14,000	30.07	+1.89	15,581	33.23	-17.11
Audrey Guibert	RN		11,676	25.07	+11.00	10,532	22.46	N/A
Olivier Vagneux	DIV		694	1.49	-0.37			
Olivier Villette	DIV		606	1.30	N/A			
Didier Cormier	REC		577	1.24	-2.65			
Valid votes			46,465	97.76	-0.21	46,893	98.18	+3.39
Blank votes			760	1.60	+0.12	640	1.34	-2.18
Null votes			307	0.64	+0.09	230	0.48	-1.21
Turnout			47,632	64.24	+19.47	47,763	64.38	+18.98
Abstentions			26,516	35.76	-19.47	26,424	35.62	-18.98
Registered voters			74,148			74,187		
Source: Ministry of the Interior, Le Monde
Result						LFI GAIN FROM RE		

=== 2022 ===
Legislative Election 2022: Essonne's 7th constituency
Party	Candidate	Votes	%	±%
LFI (NUPÉS)	Claire Lejeune	11,299	35.03	+8.29
LREM (Ensemble)	Robin Reda	10,309	31.96	+1.49
RN	Audrey Guibert	4,537	14.07	+2.28
LR (UDC)	Julien Dumaine	2,038	6.32	−17.23
REC	Antony Cardoso	1,254	3.89	N/A
DVE	Catherine Bompard	889	2.76	N/A
Others	N/A	1,415		
Turnout		32,924	44.77	−1.12
2nd round result
LREM (Ensemble)	Robin Reda	15,935	50.34	+3.38
LFI (NUPÉS)	Claire Lejeune	15,721	49.66	N/A
Turnout		31,656	45.40	+10.26
LREM gain from LR				

=== 2017 ===
Legislative Election 2017: Essonne's 7th constituency
Party	Candidate	Votes	%	±%
LREM	Muriel Kernreuter	10,476	30.99	
LR	Robin Reda	7,996	23.65	
EELV	Éva Sas	4,645	13.74	
LFI	Mounia Benaili	4,588	13.57	
FN	Audrey Guibert	4,060	12.01	
DLF	Nadine Marcelin	675	2.00	
Others	N/A	1,364		
Turnout		33,804	45.89	
2nd round result
LR	Robin Reda	13,731	53.04	
LREM	Muriel Kernreuter	12,156	46.96	
Turnout		25,887	35.14	
LR gain from EELV		Swing		

=== 2012 ===
Legislative Election 2012: Essonne's 7th constituency
Party	Candidate	Votes	%	±%
EELV	Éva Sas	8,868	22.34	
UMP	Françoise Briand	7,263	18.30	
DVG	François Garcia	6,396	16.11	
FN	Audrey Guibert	6,331	15.95	
FG	Gabriel Amard	4,437	11.18	
DVD	Laurence Spicher-Bernier	3,965	9.99	
MoDem	Alain Villemeur	922	2.32	
Others	N/A	1,511		
Turnout		39,693	55.32	
2nd round result
EELV	Éva Sas	20,334	53.90	
UMP	Françoise Briand	17,392	46.10	
Turnout		37,726	52.58	
EELV gain from UMP				

=== 2007 ===
Legislative Election 2007: Essonne's 7th constituency
Party	Candidate	Votes	%	±%
UMP	Jean Marsaudon	18,647	44.59	
PS	Simone Mathieu	12,176	29.12	
MoDem	Catherine Granier-Bompard	4,096	9.80	
FN	François-Xavier Dordain	1,736	4.15	
LV	Evelyne Damm	1,245	2.98	
PCF	Michèle Plottu	1,121	2.68	
Far left	Michel Lopes	819	2.13	
Others	N/A	1,904		
Turnout		42,352	58.92	
2nd round result
UMP	Jean Marsaudon	20,523	52.04	
PS	Simone Mathieu	18,917	47.96	
Turnout		40,452	56.28	
UMP hold				

=== 2002 ===
Legislative Election 2002: Essonne's 7th constituency
Party	Candidate	Votes	%	±%
UMP	Jean Marsaudon	16,175	38.39	
PS	Gabriel Amard	13,488	32.01	
FN	Francoise Roche	4,826	11.45	
DVD	Christine Rodier	1,652	3.92	
LV	Gaelle Angelis De	1,473	3.50	
PCF	Bruno Burdet-Burdillon	1,184	2.81	
Others	N/A	3,334		
Turnout		42,809	65.44	
2nd round result
UMP	Jean Marsaudon	21,012	53.72	
PS	Gabriel Amard	18,101	46.28	
Turnout		40,348	61.68	
UMP hold				

=== 1997 ===
Legislative Election 1997: Essonne's 7th constituency
Party	Candidate	Votes	%	±%
PS	Marie-Noëlle Lienemann	13,158	30.40	
RPR	Jean Marsaudon	12,981	29.99	
FN	Michel-Pascal Dalmas	7,292	16.85	
PCF	Jean-Michel Leterrier	3,363	7.77	
LO	Jean-Jacques Campini	1,220	2.82	
DVD	Jacques Arlotto	1,171	2.71	
GE	François Benetin	1,097	2.53	
Far left	Alain Roch	1,020	2.36	
Others	N/A	1,984		
Turnout		45,014	66.46	
2nd round result
RPR	Jean Marsaudon	23,036	50.43	
PS	Marie-Noëlle Lienemann	22,647	49.57	
Turnout		48,089	71.01	
RPR gain from PS				

== Sources ==
Official results of French elections from 2002: "Résultats électoraux officiels en France" (in French).
