= Sandrine Mazetier =

French politician

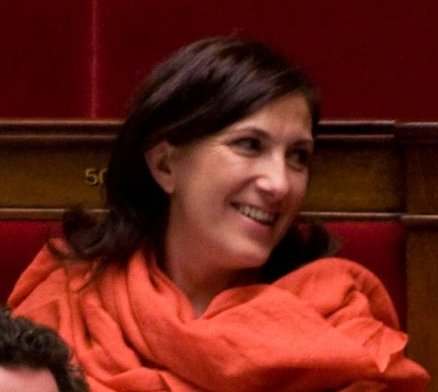

Member of the National Assembly for Paris's 8th constituency
- In office 2007–2017
- Preceded by: Jean de Gaulle
- Succeeded by: Laetitia Avia

Personal details
- Born: 16 December 1966 (age 59) Rodez, France
- Party: Socialist Party
- Education: CELSA Paris

Sandrine Mazetier (born 16 December 1966 in Rodez, Aveyron) is a member of the National Assembly of France. She represents the city of Paris, and is a member of the Socialiste, radical, citoyen et divers gauche.
