= Bruno Bonnell =

French businessman and politician (born 1958)

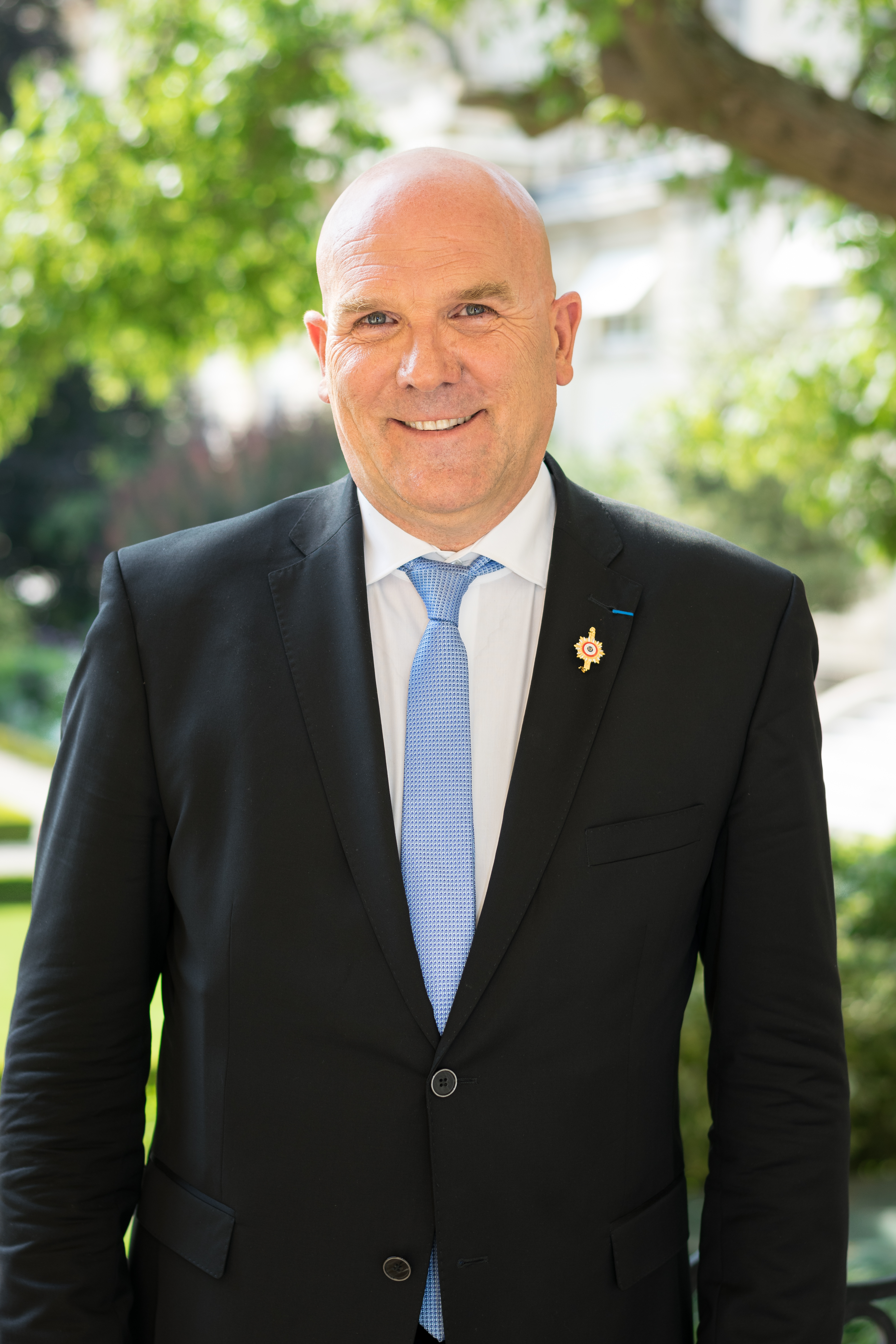
- Bonnell in 2017

Member of the National Assembly for Rhône's 6th constituency
- In office 21 June 2017 – 30 January 2022
- Preceded by: Pascale Crozon
- Succeeded by: Gabriel Amard

Personal details
- Born: 6 October 1958 (age 67) Algiers, French Algeria
- Party: La République En Marche!
- Education: CPE Lyon; Paris Dauphine University

Bruno Bonnell (French pronunciation: [bʁyno bɔnɛl]; born 6 October 1958) is a French businessman and politician who represented the 6th constituency of Rhône in the National Assembly from 2017 until his resignation in 2022. A member of La République En Marche! (LREM), he is a co-founder of Infogrames Entertainment SA.

== Career in the private sector ==
Bonnell began his career on the Thomson TO7, one of the earliest French-produced home computers, before founding Infogrames in June 1983. He founded this company at age 25 with Christophe Sapet and Thomas Schmider.

Bonnell was chairman and chief creative officer of the company from 1983 to 5 April 2007. He was also chief executive officer; a position he held from 1983 until a stockholder vote in 2003 showed a lack of confidence in his management of the company’s debts. He stepped down as CEO of Atari (while retaining his other two positions in IESA) in 2004 to be replaced by James Caparro, although he took up the position again on a temporary basis when Caparro resigned in June 2005. On 5 September 2006, David Pierce was appointed as new CEO of Atari.

In 1995, Bonnell was elected president of the Syndicat des Editeurs de Logiciels de Loisirs (SELL), a French game developer association. He worked together with French broadcaster Groupe Canal+ to create the television channel Game One, which was specifically aimed at a gaming audience. Intended as a European channel, Game One broadcast in the French language.

Bonnell spearheaded takeovers of many smaller (and a few larger) development studios over the 1980s and 1990s, most notably British development house Ocean Software and Atari, as well as GT Interactive, Accolade, Gremlin Graphics and Hasbro Interactive. These companies were integrated into the Infogrames infrastructure. Their brand names were abandoned, with the exception of Atari, which Bonnell felt had value. For this reason, Infogrames began using the Atari brand on games published around Christmas 2001 and renamed itself to Atari, Inc. in the US in 2003. Beyond his involvement in Infogrames & Atari, Bonnell is also a shareholder in Lyon's Association football; the Olympique Lyonnais.

On 5 April 2007, Bonnell resigned from his positions at Atari and Infogrames. On the day of the announcement of his departure IESA's shares jumped 24%. In June 2008, he joined zSlide, a company based near Paris. As of 2013 he was working for Robopolis, a Lyon-based robot distributor.

On 31 May 2012, Bonnell was elected as President of the EMLyon Business School Board. EMLyon is a business school in Lyon, created in 1872.

In 2015, Bonnell served as the host and judge of The Apprentice: Qui décrochera le job ?, the French version of the global reality television franchise The Apprentice. Only two episodes of the show were aired, due to low ratings, although the entire season was streamed on demand. The show's producers did not blame Bonnell for the show's failure but rather an overall failure of the concept, though they admitted that the show would have done better if Bonnell were better-known.

== Political career ==
On 11 May 2017, Bonnnell was nominated by En Marche! to contest Rhône's 6th constituency, against minister Najat Vallaud-Belkacem, in the legislative elections.

In parliament, Bonnell served on the Committee on Economic Affairs. In addition to his committee assignments, he was a member of the French-Azerbaijani Parliamentary Friendship Group and the French-Ukrainian Parliamentary Friendship Group.

When Richard Ferrand was elected president of the National Assembly in 2018, Bonnell initially considered to run as a candidate to succeed him as chairman of the LREM parliamentary group but later endorsed Gilles Le Gendre instead.

In June 2021, Bonnell announced that he would not stand in the 2022 elections but instead resign from active politics by the end of the parliamentary term.

== Later career ==
In 2022, Bonnell was appointed by President Emmanuel Macron to lead the "France 2030" investment plan, a program including 15 billion euros ($16.9 billion) of new funding to speed up moves to a greener economy.

== Political positions ==
In July 2019, Bonnell voted in favor of the French ratification of the European Union's Comprehensive Economic and Trade Agreement (CETA) with Canada.
