= Jean de Gaulle =

French politician (born 1953)

Member of the French National Assembly for Paris
- In office 1993–2007
- Preceded by: Pierre de Bénouville
- Succeeded by: Sandrine Mazetier

Personal details
- Born: 13 June 1953 (age 72) Bourg-en-Bresse, France
- Party: UMP
- Education: Ecole supérieure libre des sciences commerciales appliquées Paris Dauphine University; Conservatoire national des arts et métiers HEC Paris

Jean de Gaulle (born 13 June 1953) is a French politician.

He is the son of Philippe de Gaulle and Henriette de Montalembert, and grandson of General Charles de Gaulle, Leader of Free France and President of France from 1958 to 1969. He was the Mayor of Thenezay from 24 March 1989 to 18 June 1995.

== Life ==
=== Education ===
He graduated from the Ecole supérieure libre des sciences commerciales appliquées. He obtained a DESS (sort of equivalent of a Master of Advanced Studies) in financial management and a DEA (Diplôme d'études approfondies) in management control from the Université de Paris IX-Dauphine. He received another DEA from the Institut national des techniques économiques et comptables (Intec of the Conservatoire national des Arts et Métiers) in chartered accountant. He received an Executive Master of Business Administration (EMBA) from the HEC group.

=== Career in audit and accountancy ===
He began his career in auditing and chartered accountancy, becoming a partner in the auditing and chartered accountancy firm Barbier-Frinault & Associés in Paris (1983–86), a member of the Arthur Andersen international network. A chartered accountant and statutory auditor, he practiced on a self-employed basis between 1986 and 2006.

=== Political career ===
He was elected Member of the Parliament (MP) for Deux-Sèvres from 1986 to 1993, mayor of Thénezay in Deux-Sèvres (1989–95), then member and vice-president of the Regional Council of Poitou-Charentes (1992–94). He was elected MP for Paris (1993 to 2007), secretary of the National Assembly (1992–95) and vice-president of the National Assembly (1995–97). He was then a member of the UMP group. Elected to the Council of Paris in 1995, he was deputy mayor of Paris from 1996 to 2001. On 2 January 2007, he resigned as a member of parliament following his appointment to the Cour des Comptes and did not stand for re-election in the 2007 legislative election.

On 21 December 2006 he was appointed external adviser to the French Court of Auditors ("Cour des Comptes" created by Napoleon) until December 2020. He was appointed Member of the College of Autorité des Marchés Financiers (AMF) from February 2019 to September 2021.
