= Nathalie Gautier =

French politician (1951–2006)

Deputy of the National Assembly for Rhône's 6th constituency
- In office 19 June 2002 – 1 September 2006
- Preceded by: Marc Fraysse
- Succeeded by: Lilian Zanchi

Personal details
- Born: 23 September 1951 La Tronche, Isère, France
- Died: 1 September 2006 (aged 54) Chamonix, Haute-Savoie, France
- Party: Socialist Party
- Children: 4

Nathalie Gautier (23 September 1951 – 1 September 2006) was a French politician of the Socialist Party. She was a councillor for the Lyon urban community from 1989 as well as a general councillor for the canton of Villeurbanne-Sud in the Rhône region between 1990 and 2001. Gautier represented Rhône's 6th constituency of the National Assembly from 2002 till her death from cancer in 2006.

== Early life and education ==
Gautier was born in La Tronche, Isère on 23 September 1951. She graduated from the Institute of Alpine Geography with a master's degree in geography and a master's degree in political science at the Grenoble Institute of Political Studies. Gautier also obtained a Diplôme d'Études Supérieur Appliqué in Urban Planning and Development as well as a certificate of aptitude for secondary school teachers in Training Engineering.

== Career ==
She was first elected to the municipal council alongside Charles Hernu as deputy mayor of Villeurbanne in 1983. Gautier would go on to work under four successive mayors, and served as a councillor for the Lyon urban community from 1989 as well as a general councillor for the canton of Villeurbanne-Sud in the Rhône region between 1990 and 2001. She had responsibility or green spaces, urban planning and later urban landscapes. Gautier was chair of the urban planning commission for Greater Lyon.

At the 2002 French legislative election, she stood for election to the National Assembly as a deputy of Rhône's 6th constituency as a member of the Socialist Party. Gautier won election and took up her seat on 19 June 2002. She was president of the France–Latvia friendship group and a member of the National Assembly's Committee on Economic, Environmental and Territorial Affairs. Gautier was also a member of the Special Committee to Examine the Draft Law on Economic Initiative and was a member of various study groups on such as housing, employment, urban policy, women's rights and education. She was president of Segapal, the semi-public company that managed and ran the Miribel-Jonage Nature Park. Gautier had planned to stand for re-election at the 2007 French legislative election but was succeeded by Lilian Zanchi upon her death.

== Personal life ==
She was married and had four children. Gautier died of cancer on 1 September 2006. Her funeral took place in Villeurbanne on the morning of 6 September.
