= Françoise Briand =

French politician (born 1951)

Member of the National Assembly for Essonne's 7th constituency
- In office 19 September 2008 – 19 June 2012
- Preceded by: Jean Marsaudon
- Succeeded by: Éva Sas

Personal details
- Born: 20 April 1951 (age 75) Paris, France
- Party: Union for a Popular Movement
- Education: School for Advanced Studies in the Social Sciences

Françoise Briand (French pronunciation: [fʁɑ̃swaz bʁijɑ̃]; born 20 April 1951) is a French politician who was Member of Parliament for Essonne's 7th constituency from 2008 to 2012.

== Biography ==
=== Origins and Family Life ===
Françoise Briand was born on 20 April 1951, in Paris.

=== Professional career ===
Françoise Briand worked as a research engineer (secretary) in social sciences at the École des hautes études en sciences sociales (School for Advanced Studies in the Social Sciences). In the French civil service, a "research engineer" is a civil servant primarily assigned to public institutions with scientific, cultural, and professional purposes, as well as scientific and technological public institutions (EPST), the Ministries of Agriculture, Culture, and National Education.

=== Political career ===
Françoise Briand was elected as an opposition municipal councilor in Viry-Châtillon during the 2001 municipal elections on the Union for French Democracy (UDF) list led by Catherine Granier-Bompard, which received 45.81% of the votes in the first round. In the 2007 legislative elections, she served as the substitute for Jean Marsaudon, who won the seventh constituency of Essonne with 52.04% of the votes. In the 2008 municipal elections, she was second on the Nouveau Centre - UMP list, which was defeated with 46.32% of the votes in the first round. She resigned the day after the defeat. When Jean Marsaudon died on 18 September 2008, she became a deputy herself. In the 2012 legislative elections, she was defeated by her opponent from Europe Ecology – The Greens (EÉL V) with 46.10% of the votes. This was a very negative result in a constituency that had always remained right-wing since its creation.

She ran as a candidate (supported by the Union for a Popular Movement (UMP)) in the 2014 municipal elections but only received 20.26% of the votes in the first round, behind incumbent mayor Simone Mathieu (Left Party) with 24.47%, and significantly behind Jean-Marie Vilain (Ainsi va la ville association) with 40.20%. Forced to withdraw, she witnessed the triumph of the "Ainsi Va La Ville" list (65% in the second round).
