= Laetitia Avia =

French politician

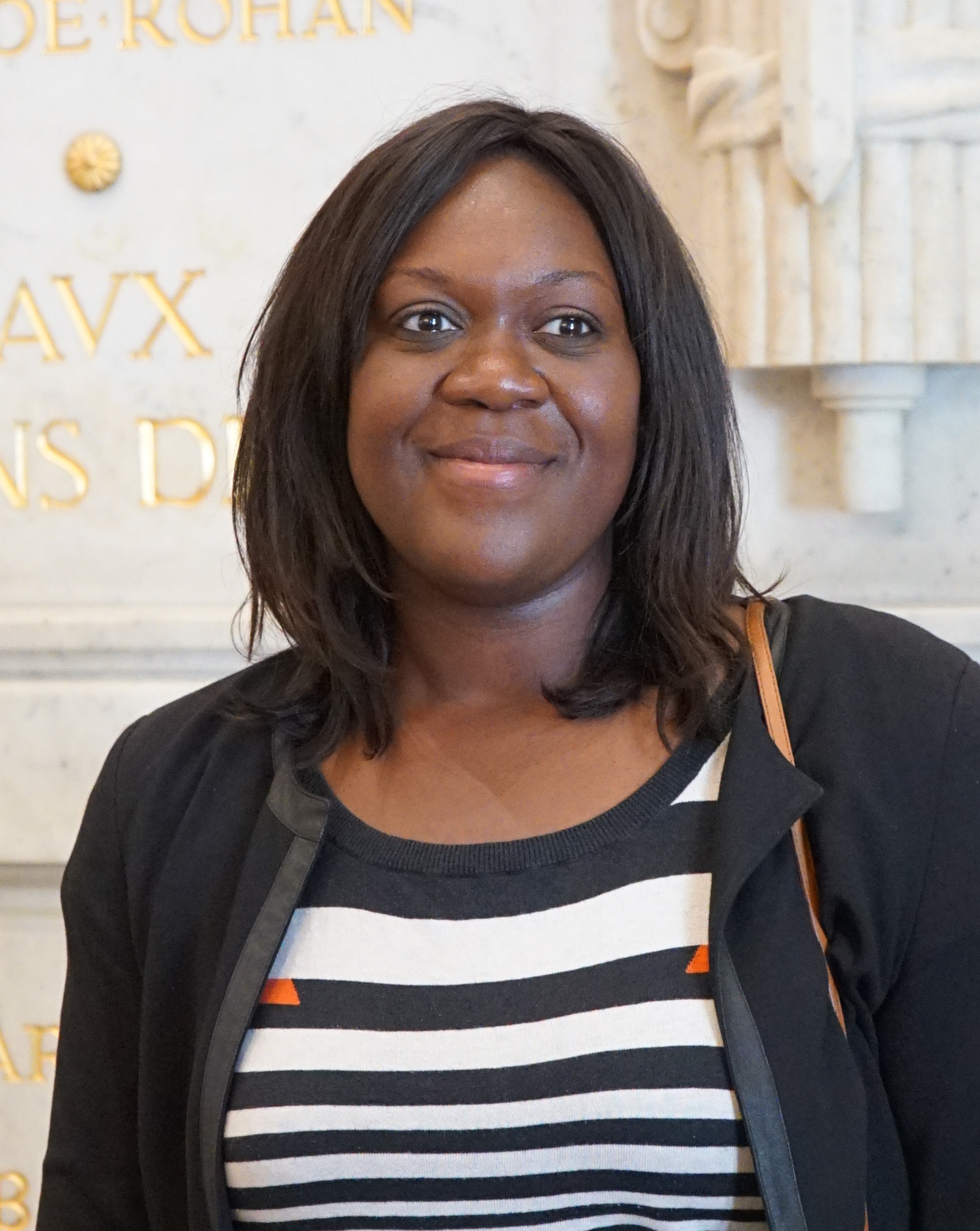

Member of the National Assembly for Paris's 8th constituency
- In office 21 June 2017 – 21 June 2022
- Preceded by: Sandrine Mazetier
- Succeeded by: Éva Sas

Personal details
- Born: 29 October 1985 (age 40) Livry-Gargan, France
- Party: La République En Marche!
- Education: Sciences Po
- Profession: Lawyer

Laetitia Avia (born 29 October 1985) is a French lawyer and politician of La République En Marche! (LREM) who served as the member of the National Assembly for the 8th constituency of Paris from 2017 to 2022, representing a constituency covering parts of the 12th and 20th arrondissements.

== Early life and education ==
Avia is of Togolese descent and grew up in Seine-Saint-Denis, Paris’s northern suburbs. Her parents moved there from Togo, where her father studied engineering and her mother was a midwife. In France, her father worked as an airport luggage handler and driver and her mother as a nurse. Avia acquired French nationality at age 13.

Avia studied at Sciences Po in Paris and McGill University’s law school in Montreal. She began her career as a corporate lawyer with Darrois Villey Maillot Brochier before co-founding APE Avocats in 2016. Early in her career, she made her mark as a lawyer involved in corporate disputes and was active in projects in sub-Saharan Africa.

== Political career ==
When Emmanuel Macron created his own party in 2016, then called En Marche, Avia joined and offered her help. Macron subsequently took her on as a legal expert.

Avia was one of the first fourteen candidates selected by Macron to run as LREM candidate for the 2017 French legislative election. She won the eighth district of Paris with 65 percent of the vote. In parliament, she served on the Committee on Legal Affairs. In this capacity, she was the parliament’s rapporteur on hate speech legislation. In 2018, she proposed to classify discrimination against France’s regional accents – so-called “glottophobia” – with other forms of prohibited discrimination such as on grounds of sex or race. That same year, she was appointed co-rapporteur (with Didier Paris) on justice reform.

In addition to her committee assignments, Avia was a member of the French-Canadian Parliamentary Friendship Group and of the French-Ghanaian Parliamentary Friendship Group.

From late 2017 on, Avia was part of LREM's 20-member executive board under the leadership of the party's chairman Christophe Castaner, in charge of communications.

In September 2018, after Richard Ferrand's election as president of the National Assembly, Avia announced her candidacy to succeed him as chair of the LREM group. In an internal vote, however, she was eliminated in the first ballot. In July 2019, she stood as a candidate for the chairmanship of the Committee on Legal Affairs; however, she was defeated in the second round by the incumbent chairwoman, Yaël Braun-Pivet.

In May 2020, Avia's draft law against hate speech, now referred to as the Avia Law (France), was adopted by the National Assembly. Shortly after, it was challenged before the Constitutional Council by a group of conservative senators; the Council ruled in June 2020 that large parts of the law were unconstitutional.

After the second round of the legislative elections on the 19th of June 2020 she lost her position in the assembly, losing to Eva Sas.

== Controversies ==
In 2017, Avia was accused of biting a taxi driver. The driver's debit machine was not working and she did not have cash to pay the fare. When the driver continued to drive to a cash machine, the police report noted that she acknowledged she bit him to stop the car. She later denied the bite, saying that she had grabbed him by the shoulder. She filed a complaint against the driver for attempted theft and kidnapping while the driver filed a claim against her for assault.

In a 12 May 2020 article from the online investigation site Mediapart, former parliamentary assistants accused Avia of using racist, sexist and homophobic language in communicating with her team. They accused her of harassing an assistant with frequent racist comments in order to get him to resign instead of having to fire him. The publication of this article happened the day before the final vote at the parliament for a law brought forth by Mrs Avia and aiming at censoring hate speech online. On 18 May, her former collaborators announced that they would formally file a complaint for workplace harassment.

According to the previously mentioned Mediapart article, Avia asked her assistants to remove information about the taxi driver controversy from her article on the French language Wikipedia. In the history of the page journalists found modifications made by IP addresses from the French National Assembly.

== Other activities ==
- African Business Lawyers Club (ABLC), Member
- Club XXIe siècle, Member

== Political positions ==
In May 2018, Avia co-sponsored an initiative in favour of legalizing assisted reproductive technology (ART) for all women (singles, heterosexual couples or lesbian couples).

In 2020, Avia was one of the LREM members who endorsed an animal welfare referendum calling for a ban on some hunting practices that are deemed “cruel.”

== Personal life ==
Avia is married and lives with her partner in Vincennes.
