= Éva Sas =

French politician (born 1970)

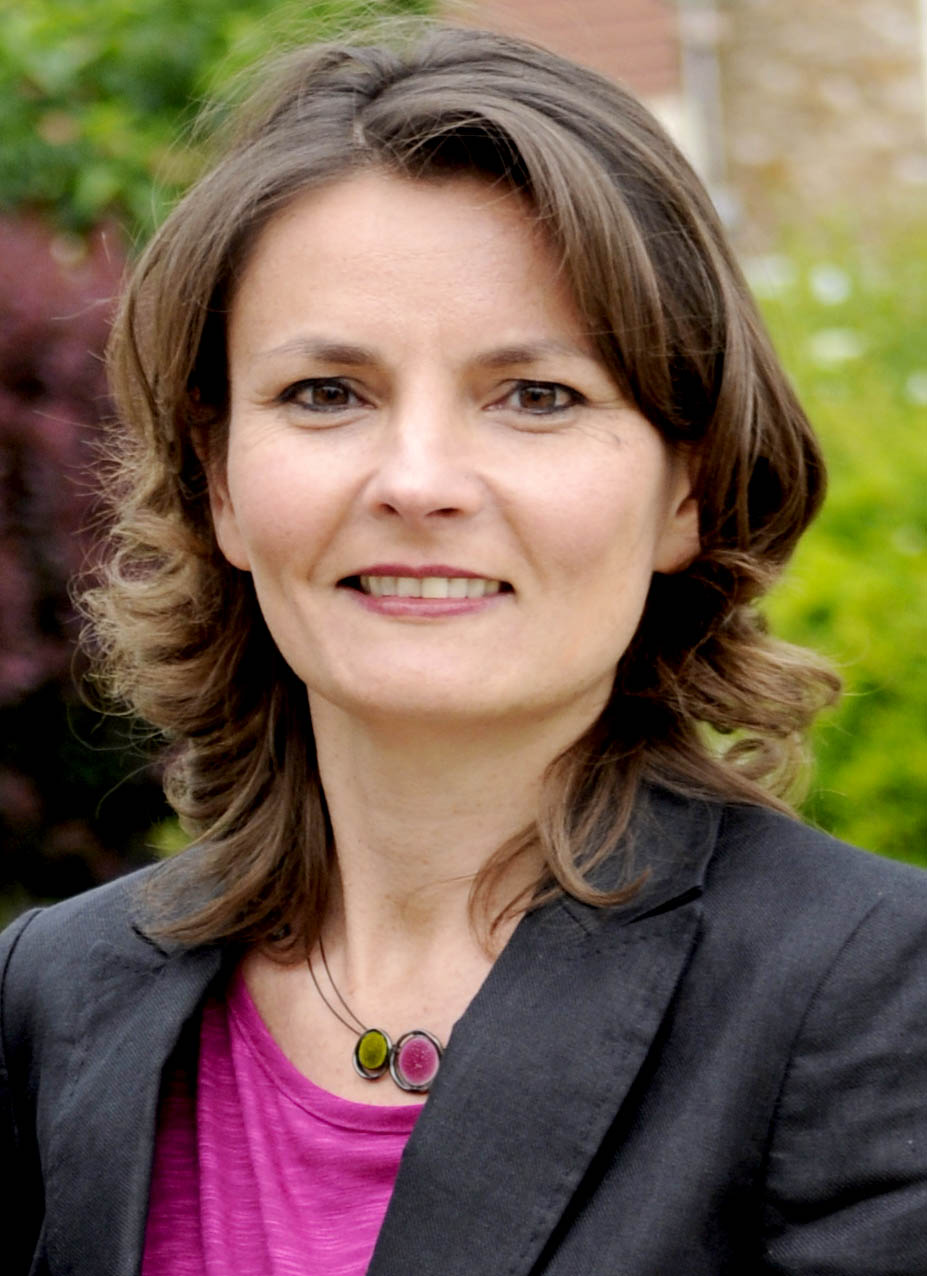
- Éva Sas in 2012

Member of the National Assembly for Paris's 8th constituency
- Incumbent
- Assumed office 22 June 2022
- Preceded by: Laetitia Avia

Member of the National Assembly for Essonne's 7th constituency
- In office 20 June 2012 – 20 June 2017
- Preceded by: Françoise Briand
- Succeeded by: Robin Reda

Personal details
- Born: 13 August 1970 (age 56) Nice, France
- Party: The Ecologists; NUPES
- Education: ESSEC Business School; Paris-Sorbonne University

Éva Sas (born 13 August 1970) is a French politician from Europe Ecology – The Greens. She was a Member of Parliament from 2012 to 2017, and has been again since 2022.

== Early life ==
Sas was born in Nice in 1970.

== Political career ==
She was elected in Essonne's 7th constituency at the 2012 French elections, unseating incumbent Republican MP Françoise Briand.

She lost her seat to Republican candidate Robin Reda at the 2017 French legislative election

She was an unsuccessful candidate in the 2018 Essonne's 1st constituency by-election.

She was the NUPES candidate in Paris's 8th constituency in the 2022 French legislative election. She was elected in the second round, defeating LREM candidate Laetitia Avia.
