= Robin Reda =

French politician

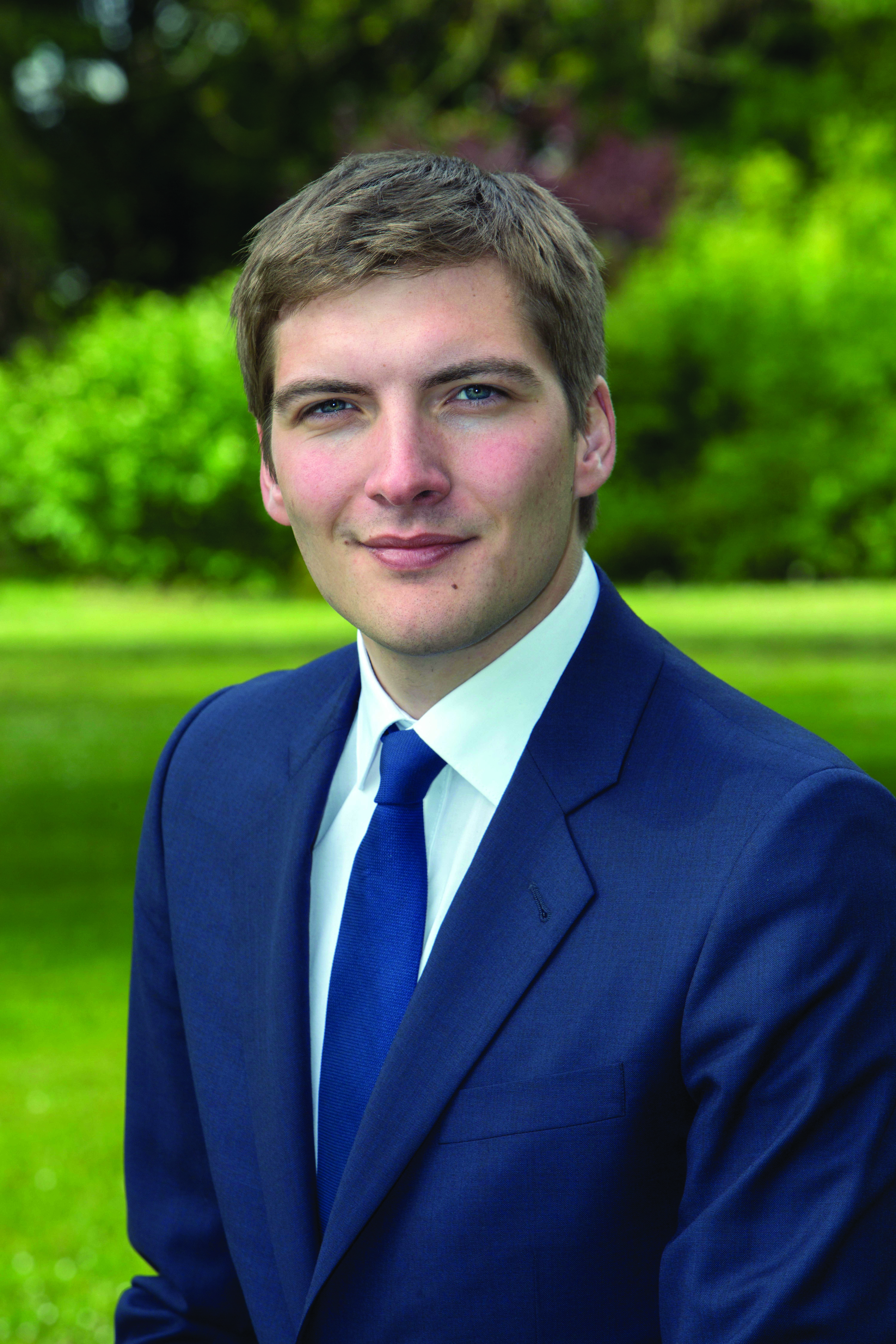
- Reda in 2017

Member of the National Assembly for Essonne's 7th constituency
- In office 21 June 2017 – 9 June 2024
- Preceded by: Éva Sas
- Succeeded by: Claire Lejeune

Mayor of Juvisy-sur-Orge
- In office 30 March 2014 – 4 July 2017
- Preceded by: Étienne Chaufour
- Succeeded by: Michel Perrimond

Personal details
- Born: 10 May 1991 (age 35) Savigny-sur-Orge, France
- Party: The Republicans (2015-2019, since 2021); Soyons Libres (since 2019); Renaissance (since 2022)
- Spouse: Lamia Bensarsa (m. 2018)
- Children: 1
- Education: Sciences Po

Robin Reda (born 10 May 1991) is a French politician who represented the 7th constituency of Essonne in the National Assembly from 2017 to 2024. A member of The Republicans (LR), he previously served as Mayor of Juvisy-sur-Orge from 2014 to 2017.

== Political career ==
In parliament, Reda served on the Finance Committee (2019–2024) and the Committee on Legal Affairs (2017–2021). In addition to his committee assignments, he was part of the French-Egyptian Parliamentary Friendship Group.

Reda was a member of The Republicans until 2017, when he joined the new Soyons Libres party.

He was re-elected in the 2022 French legislative election as a LREM (Ensemble) candidate but lost his seat at the 2024 French legislative election.

In 2024, Reda was appointed special adviser to Minister of Education Anne Genetet.

== Political positions ==
In the Republicans' 2017 leadership election, Reda supported Florence Portelli. Ahead of the Republicans’ 2021 primaries, he endorsed Valérie Pécresse as the party’s candidate for 2022 presidential elections.

Within Ensemble, Reda was considered to be part of his parliamentary group's conservative wing.
