= Rhône's 6th constituency =

Constituency of the National Assembly of France

6th constituency of Rhône
- inline Constituency of the National Assembly of France

- The constituency in the Rhône
- Deputy: Gabriel Amard; LFI
- Department: Rhône

The 6th constituency of Rhône is a French legislative constituency in Rhône. It covers areas east of the city of Lyon.

As of December 2022, it is represented by Gabriel Amard of La France insoumise.

== Historic representation ==
Election	Member	Party
1988	Charles Hernu	PS
1990	Jean-Paul Bret	PS
1993	Marc Fraysse	RPR
1997	Jean-Paul Bret	PS
2002	Nathalie Gautier	PS
2006	Lilian Zanchi	PS
2007	Pascale Crozon	PS
2012	Pascale Crozon	PS
2017	Bruno Bonnell	REM
2022	Gabriel Amard	LFI
2024	Gabriel Amard	LFI

== Election results ==
=== 2024 ===
Legislative Election 2024: Rhône's 6th constituency
Party	Candidate	Votes	%	±%
DIV	Joseph Basilien	714	1.23	n/a
LFI (NFP)	Gabriel Amard	26,876	46.16	+4.86
PS	Jean-Paul Bret*	11628	19.97	n/a
LO	Nadia Bouhami	453	0.78	n/a
RN	Délia Agus	11057	18.99	+8.19
DIV	Teyi Kekeli Lawson Doute	127	0.22	n/a
NPA	Raphaëlle Mizony	183	0.31	n/a
LR	Marc Fraysse	7190	12.35	n/a
Turnout		58,228	98.32	+52.92
Registered electors		92,008		
2nd round result
LFI	Gabriel Amard	25,352	50.57	+4.41
PS	Jean-Paul Bret	24,783	49.43	+29.46
Turnout		50,135	93.14	+49.85
Registered electors		92,020		
LFI hold		Swing		

* PS dissident without the support of the New Popular Front alliance

=== 2022 ===
Legislative Election 2022: Rhone's 6th constituency
Party	Candidate	Votes	%	±%
LFI (NUPÉS)	Gabriel Amard	16,545	41.30	+3.93
HOR (Ensemble)	Emmanuelle Haziza	10,777	26.90	-9.79
RN	Michèle Morel	4,328	10.80	+1.77
PRG	Katia Buisson	2,632	6.57	N/A
REC	Pierre Porta	1,774	4.43	N/A
DVE	Zaïr Mezani	720	1.80	N/A
UDI (UDC)	Clément Charlieu	700	1.75	−8.92
Others	N/A	2,589	-	−
Turnout		40,065	45.40	−0.72
2nd round result
LFI (NUPÉS)	Gabriel Amard	20,397	55.54	+15.72
HOR (Ensemble)	Emmanuelle Haziza	16,328	44.46	−15.72
Turnout		36,725	43.29	+6.47
LFI gain from LREM				

=== 2017 ===
Legislative Election 2017: Rhône's 6th constituency
Party	Candidate	Votes	%	±%
LREM	Bruno Bonnell	13,953	36.69	N/A
PS	Najat Vallaud-Balkacem	6,288	16.54	−25.99
LFI	Laurent Legendre	5,595	14.71	N/A
LR	Emmanuelle Haziza	4,058	10.67	−13.63
FN	Stéphane Poncet	3,435	9.03	−5.99
EELV	Béatrice Vessiller	1,806	4.75	−1.28
Others	N/A	2,890		
Turnout		38,025	46.12	−6.24
2nd round result
LREM	Bruno Bonnell	18,233	60.18	N/A
PS	Najat Vallaud-Balkacem	12,063	39.82	−22.45
Turnout		30,296	36.74	−10.27
LREM gain from PS				

=== 2012 ===
2012 legislative election in Rhone's 6th constituency
Candidate	Party	First round		Second round	
Candidate	Party	Votes	%	Votes	%
Pascale Crozon	PS	17,448	42.53%	22,942	62.27%
Emmanuelle Haziza	UMP	9,971	24.30%	13,899	37.73%
Stéphane Poncet	FN	6,164	15.02%		
Sonia Bove	FG	3,077	7.50%		
Vincent Morland	EELV	2,472	6.03%		
Elvire Cruz	NC	526	1.28%		
Bernard-Armand Collini	Cap21	379	0.92%		
Damien Clauzel	PP	318	0.78%		
Claire Lainez	LO	218	0.53%		
Danièle Canton	NPA	173	0.42%		
Zaïr Meziani	AEI	169	0.41%		
Ku-Bukaka Kapela	SP	114	0.28%		
Valid votes		41,029	99.01%	36,841	96.77%
Spoilt and null votes		409	0.99%	1,229	3.23%
Votes cast / turnout		41,438	52.88%	38,070	48.58%
Abstentions		36,924	47.12%	40,292	51.42%
Registered voters		78,362	100.00%	78,362	100.00%

=== 2007 ===
Legislative Election 2007: Rhône's 6th constituency
Party	Candidate	Votes	%	±%
UMP	Henry Chabert	15,183	36.78	
PS	Pascale Crozon	10,666	25.84	
MoDem	Richard Morales	4,613	11.18	
DVG	Lilian Zanchi	3,701	8.97	
FN	Stéphane Poncet	1,911	4.63	
LV	Béatrice Vessiller	1,702	4.12	
Far left	Martine Richiardone	1,658	4.02	
Others	N/A	1,843		
Turnout		41,701	56.05	
2nd round result
PS	Pascale Crozon	21,592	53.81	
UMP	Henry Chabert	18,532	46.19	
Turnout		41,175	55.34	
PS hold				

=== 2002 ===
Legislative Election 2002: Rhône's 6th constituency
Party	Candidate	Votes	%	±%
PS	Nathalie Gautier	12,826	32.95	
UMP	Daniel Rendu	10,904	28.01	
FN	Louis Duprat	5,815	14.94	
UDF	Baptiste Dumas	1,879	4.83	
DVG	Richard Morales	1,832	4.71	
LV	Beatrice Vessiller	1,137	2.92	
Others	N/A	4,534		
Turnout		39,522	61.82	
2nd round result
PS	Nathalie Gautier	17,246	51.02	
UMP	Daniel Rendu	16,559	48.98	
Turnout		35,016	54.77	
PS hold				

=== 1997 ===
Legislative Election 1997: Rhône's 6th constituency
Party	Candidate	Votes	%	±%
PS	Jean-Paul Bret	11,539	29.71	
UDF	Patrice Hernu	8,440	21.73	
FN	Pierre Vial	8,383	21.59	
PCF	Pierre Grannec	2,706	6.97	
LV	Jacques Defosse	1,173	3.02	
LO	Jean-Luc Renault	1,072	2.76	
DVD	Olivier Grobon	912	2.35	
Far left	Dominique Mignot	835	2.15	
Others	N/A	3,775		
Turnout		40,387	64.13	
2nd round result
PS	Jean-Paul Bret	21,267	49.68	
UDF	Patrice Hernu	14,418	33.68	
FN	Pierre Vial	7,127	16.65	
Turnout		44,266	70.29	
PS gain from RPR				
