= Jean Marsaudon =

French politician

Member of the National Assembly for Essonne's 7th constituency
- In office 2 April 1993 – 18 September 2008
- Preceded by: Jean-Claude Ramos
- Succeeded by: Françoise Briand

Mayor of Savigny-sur-Orge
- In office 13 March 1983 – 18 September 2008
- Preceded by: Michel Bockelandt
- Succeeded by: Laurence Spicher-Bernier

Personal details
- Born: Jean Louis Marcel Marsaudon; 3 May 1946; Paris, France
- Died: 18 September 2008 (aged 62); Paris, France
- Political party: RPR; UMP
- Profession: Engineer

Jean Marsaudon (3 March 1946, Paris – 18 September 2008) was a member of the National Assembly of France. He represented the Essonne department, and was a member of the Union for a Popular Movement.
