= Pascale Crozon =

French politician

Member of the National Assembly for Rhône's 6th constituency
- In office 20 June 2007 – 20 June 2017
- Preceded by: Lilian Zanchi
- Succeeded by: Bruno Bonnell

Member of the Regional Council of Rhône-Alpes
- In office 2004–2007
- President: Jean-Jack Queyranne

Personal details
- Born: Pascale Clauzel; 20 May 1944 (age 80); Morillon, France
- Political party: Socialist Party

Pascale Crozon (born 20 May 1944) was a member of the National Assembly of France. She represented the Rhône department, and was a member of the Socialiste, radical, citoyen et divers gauche.
