= Church of the Holy Trinity, Košice =

Premonstratensian Church
- Holy Trinity Church, Košice
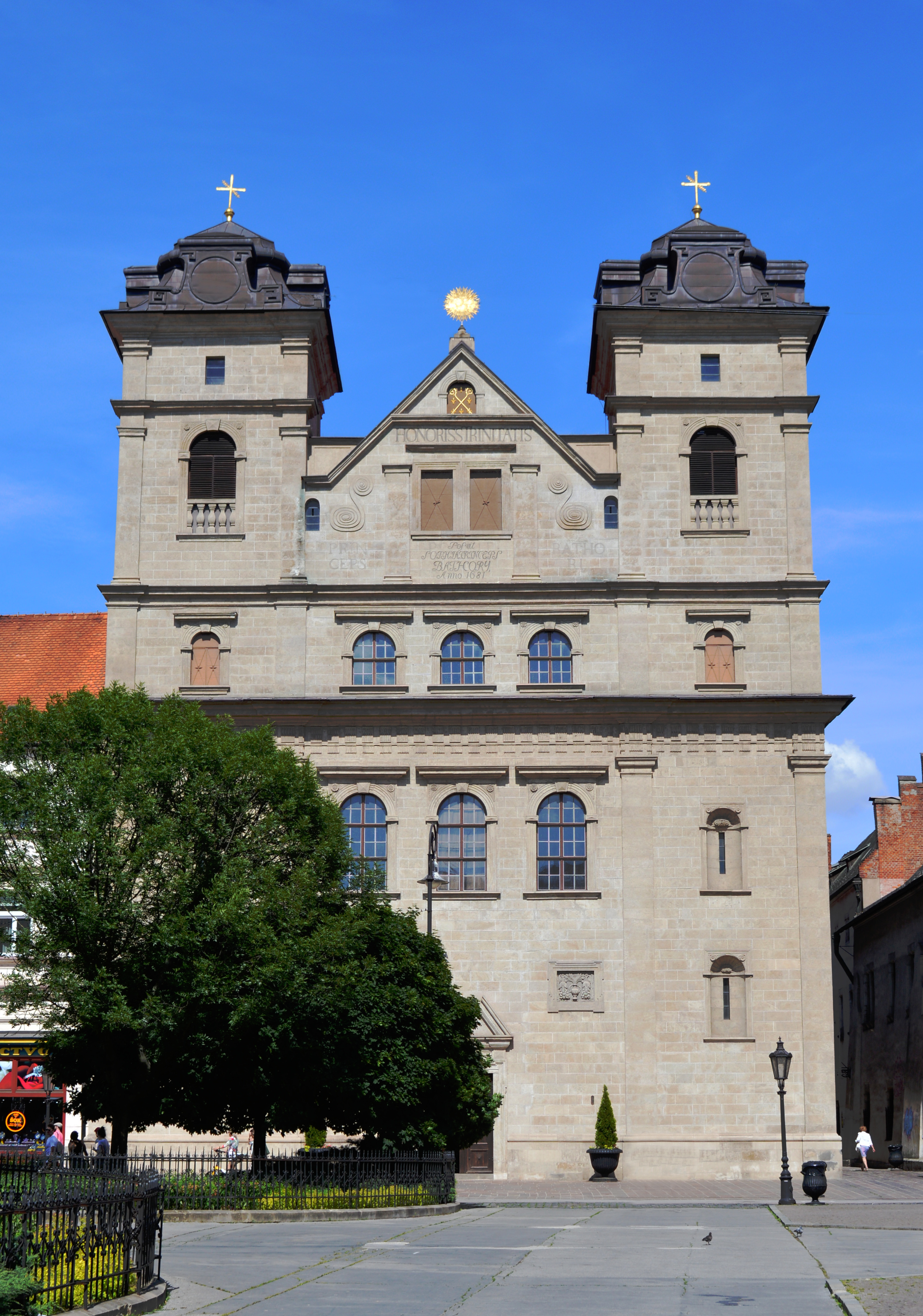
- The Premonstratensian Church in June 2021
- Premonstratensian Church
- 48.722244°N 21.257498°E
- Location: Košice
- Country: Slovakia
- Denomination: Roman Catholic

History
- Former name: Jesuit Church
- Status: Active
- Founded: 1681
- Founder: Zsófia Báthory
- Dedication: Holy Trinity

Architecture
- Functional status: Church
- Style: Baroque

The Church of the Holy Trinity or commonly known as the Premonstratensian Church (Slovak: Premonštrátny kostol), or initially the Jesuit Church (Slovak: Jezuitský kostol), is a Roman Catholic church in Košice, Slovakia. It is an example of Baroque architecture in the city and was the site of the martyrdom of three saints in 1619.

== History ==
=== Origin ===
It the Middle Ages, the Royal House (a seat of the Royal Chamber), stood on the site of the present church. In 1618, at the beginning of the Counter-Reformation and the start of the Thirty Year War, The captain of the city established there a dwelling and a chapel for Jesuits in the Protestant town. Two Jesuits Melchior Grodziecki, Stephen Pongracz were sent there, to work with a canon Marek Križin. On 7 September 1619, the forces of George I Rákóczi, the father of the Prince of Transylvania George II Rákóczi, stormed the castle and arrested the priests. They gave them a death sentence on charges of treason; accusing them of inviting the Polish army into Kassa. They were tortured and then beheaded that day. The execution of the priests shocked the local population, Catholics and Protestants alike.

=== Construction ===
In 1657, the Bishop of Eger, Benedict Kishdy, founded the first Košice University (Universitas Cassoviensis) close to the site. Later, the daughter-in-law of George I Rákóczi, Zsófia Báthory, wife of George II Rákóczi, bought the ruins of the former Royal House with intention of building a church for the Jesuits there to make amends for the events of the Thirty Years' War. In 1681, construction on the church finished and it was opened.

=== Post-suppression ===
On 21 July 1773, the Jesuits were expelled from the city as part of the suppression of the Society of Jesus. So in 1811, the church was given to Premonstratensians who currently administer the church.

== Gallery ==
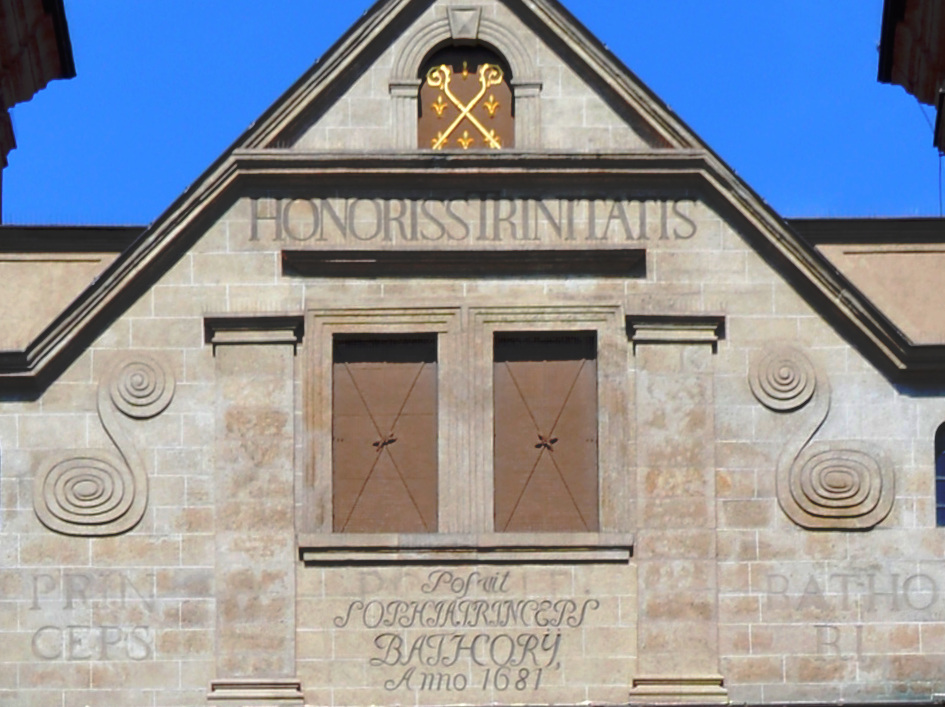
Upper part of the Church of the Holy Trinity

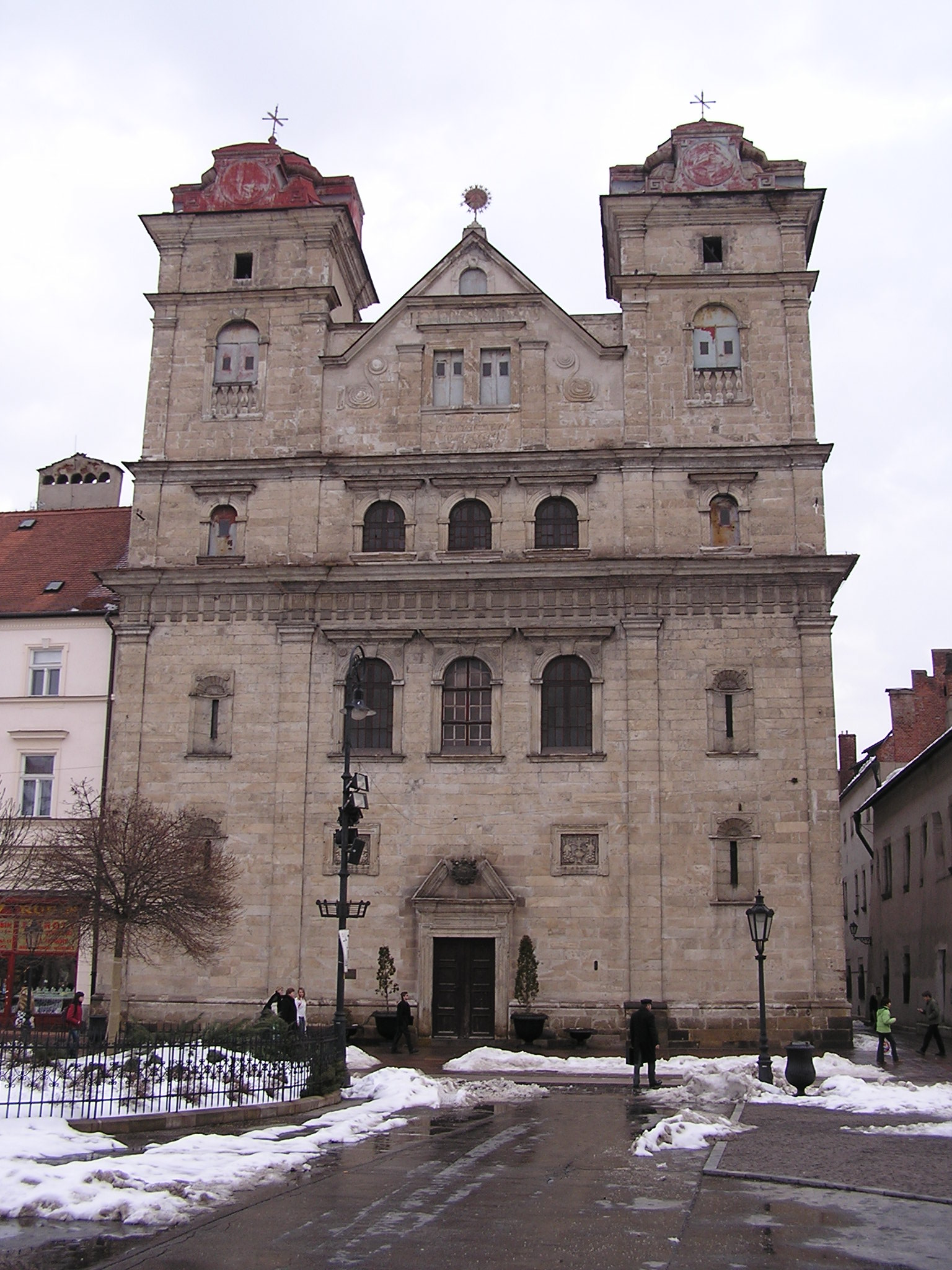
The Premonstratensian Church of Košice in 2006

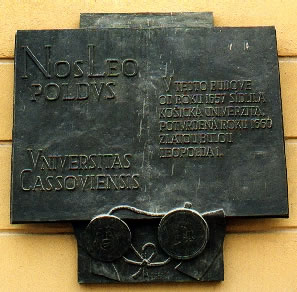
Seal of the Royal Košice University built near the site

== See also ==
- List of Jesuit sites
