= Claire Lejeune =

French politician (born 1994)

Member of the French National Assembly for Essonne's 7th constituency
- Incumbent
- Assumed office 18 July 2024
- Preceded by: Robin Reda

Personal details
- Born: Claire Morgane Lejeune; 7 September 1994 (age 31)
- Party: La France Insoumise

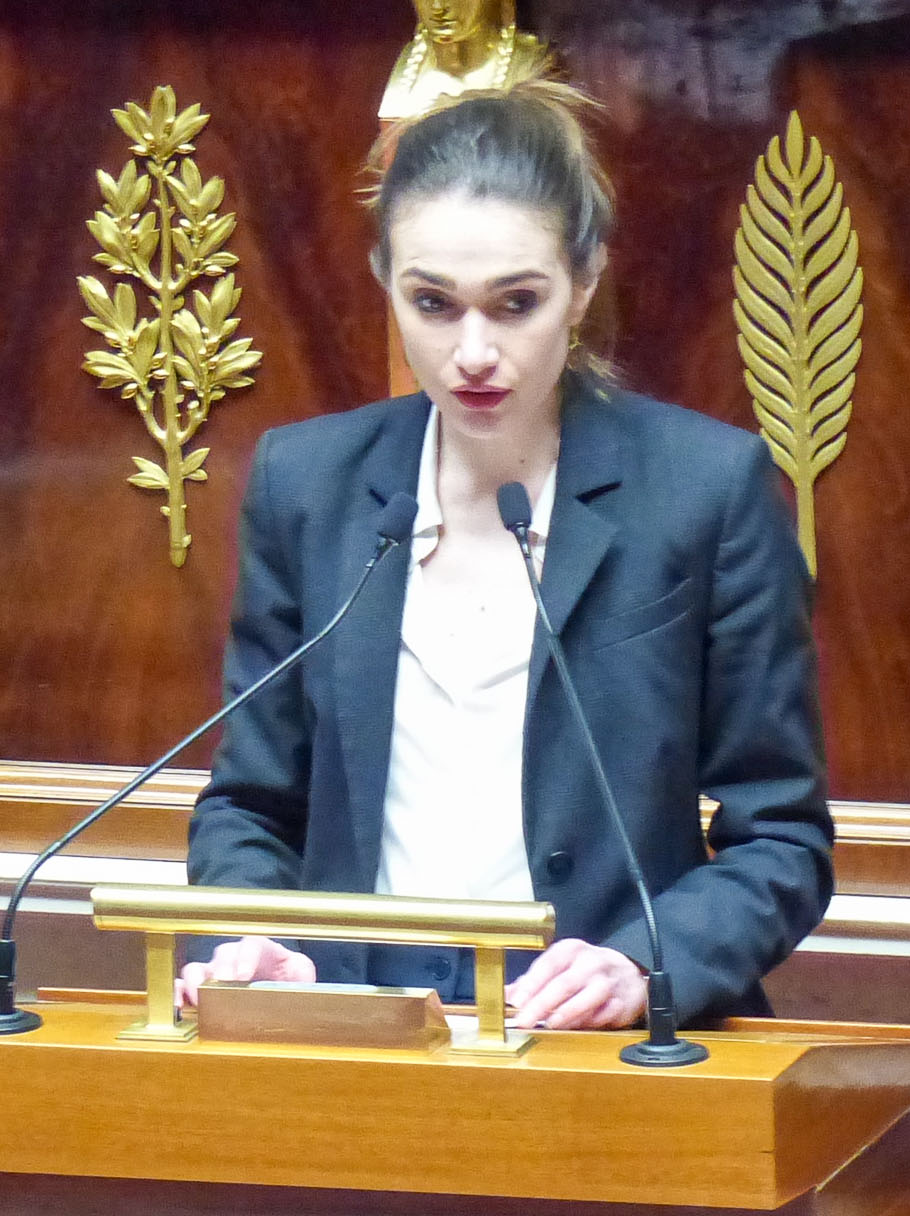
Lejeune in 2026

Claire Morgane Lejeune (born 7 September 1994) is a French politician of La France Insoumise who was elected member of the National Assembly for Essonne's 7th constituency in 2024. She served as leader of Les Jeunes Écologistes until 2020, and was a candidate for Essonne's 7th constituency in 2022.
