= Thénezay =

- Commune
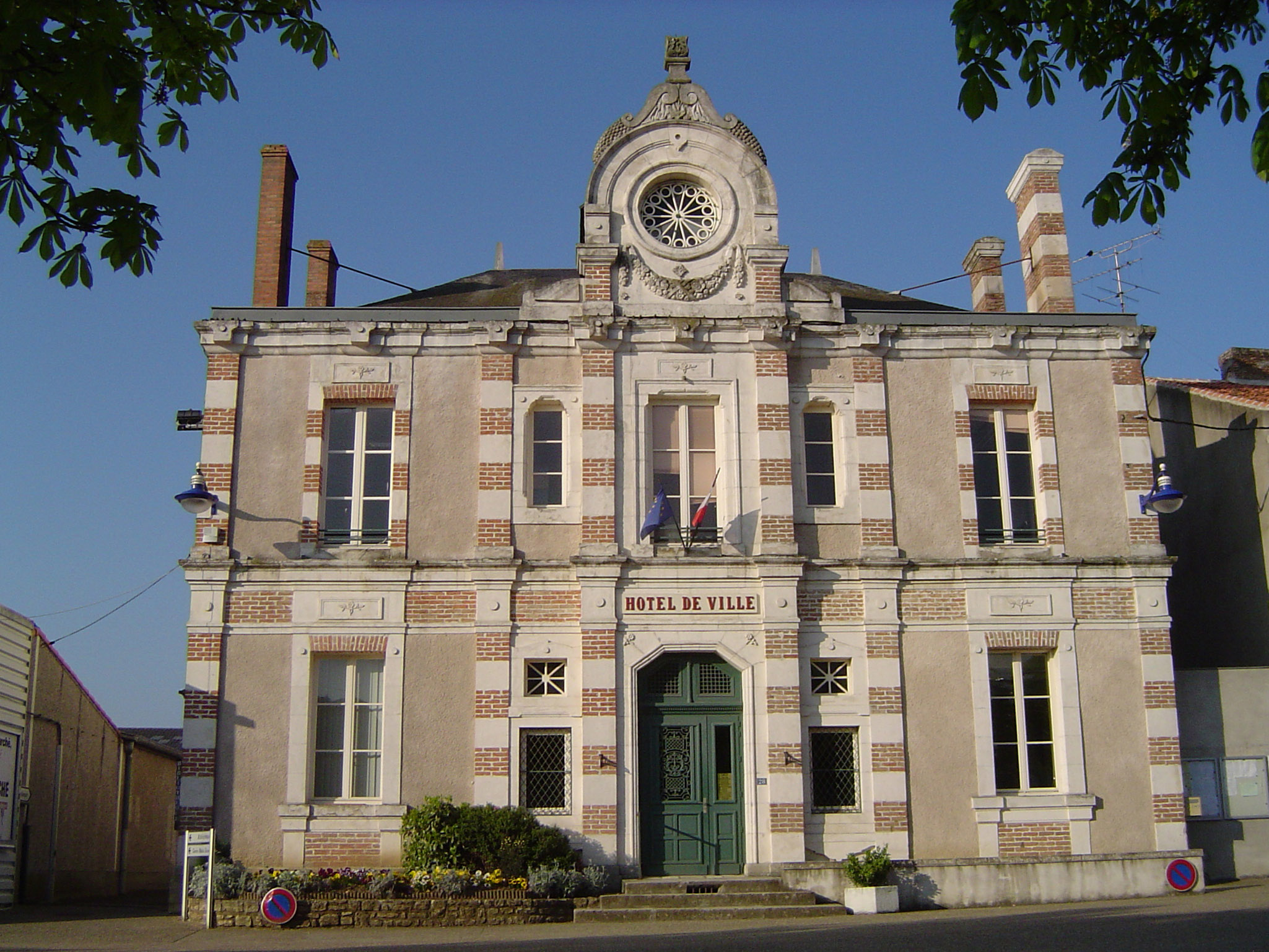
- Town hall
- Location of Thénezay
- Location within France Location within Nouvelle-Aquitaine
- Coordinates: 46°43′11″N 0°01′33″W
- Country: France
- Region: Nouvelle-Aquitaine
- Department: Deux-Sèvres
- Arrondissement: Parthenay
- Canton: La Gâtine
- Intercommunality: CC Parthenay-Gâtine

Government
  - Mayor (2023–2026): Jackie Proust
- Area^{1}: 48.49 km^{2} (18.72 sq mi)
- Elevation: 152 m (499 ft)
- Highest elevation: 175 m (574 ft)
- Lowest elevation: 107 m (351 ft)
- Population (2023): 1,400
  - Density: 29/km^{2} (75/sq mi)
- Time zone: UTC+01:00 (CET)
  - Summer (DST): UTC+02:00 (CEST)
- INSEE/Postal code: 79326 /79390
- ^{1} French Land Register data, which excludes lakes, ponds, glaciers > 1 km^{2} (0.386 sq mi or 247 acres) and river estuaries.

Thénezay (French pronunciation: [tenzɛ]) is a commune in the Deux-Sèvres department in western France.

== See also ==
- Communes of the Deux-Sèvres department
