= Melchior Grodziecki =

Silesian Jesuit priest, martyr, and Catholic saint

Saint Melchior Grodziecki S.J.
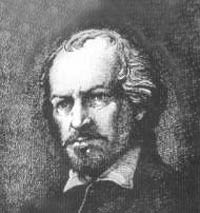
- 17th-century drawing

Martyr and Saint
- Born: c. 1582; Cieszyn
- Died: 7 September 1619; Kassa, Kingdom of Hungary (today Košice, Slovakia)
- Venerated in: Slovakia, Roman Catholic Church, Society of Jesus
- Beatified: 15 January 1905, Vatican City by Pope Pius X
- Canonized: 2 July 1995, Košice by Pope John Paul II
- Major shrine: Premonstratensian Church (Košice)
- Feast: 19 January
- Patronage: Archdiocese of Katowice, Diocese of Bielsko–Żywiec

Melchior Grodziecki (c. 1582 – 7 September 1619) was a Silesian Jesuit priest. He is considered a martyr and saint by the Catholic Church. He was canonized in 1995 and is liturgically commemorated on 19 January.

== Biography ==
He was born in Těšín into the noble Grodziecki family, and received his education in the Jesuit college of Vienna. In 1603 he entered the Jesuit novitiate of Brno. After making his first religious profession in 1605, he went on to the Jesuit College in Kłodzko (1606–1607). To be able to teach in high schools, he spent a year in the seminary in České Budějovice. In 1608, he returned to Kłodzko to complete his education in music. He graduated from philosophy and theology in the Clementinum of Prague and in 1614 was ordained a priest. From 1616, he was entrusted with the management of a hostel in Prague for poor students.

After the outbreak of the Thirty Years' War (1618–1648), he was sent to Kassa, Kingdom of Hungary (today Košice, Slovakia) with Hungarian István Pongrácz, a colleague from the Jesuit seminary. When the army of the Prince of Transylvania, George Rákóczi, took Kassa, Melchior stayed at the castle, together with István Pongrácz and canon Marko Krizin. On 7 September 1619, the Transylvanian army stormed the castle and arrested the priests. They gave them a death sentence on charges of treason; accusing them of inviting the Polish army into Kassa. They were tortured and then beheaded that day.

The bodies of the martyrs were recovered, after negotiations with Gabriel Bethlen, and were buried in the vicinity of Kassa. In 1636, they were moved to Nagyszombat (today: Trnava, Slovakia).

== Veneration and Canonization ==
The cause of beatification of the Kassa (Košice) martyrs was opened in 1628 and they were finally beatified on 15 January 1905 by Pope Pius X. They were canonized on 2 July 1995, in Košice itself by Pope John Paul II. The Jesuits celebrate a feast day on 19 January for the Martyrs of the Reformation in Europe.

== See also ==
- List of Jesuits
