= Stephen Pongracz =

Hungarian Jesuit priest, martyr and saint

Saint Stephen Pongracz SJ
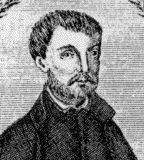
- 17th-century drawing

Martyr
- Born: István Pongrácz c. 1583; Alvinc, Principality of Transylvania
- Died: 7 September 1619; Kassa, Kingdom of Hungary
- Venerated in: Hungary, Catholic Church, Society of Jesus
- Beatified: 15 January 1905, St Peter's Basilica, Rome by Pope Pius X
- Canonized: 2 July 1995, Košice, Slovakia by Pope John Paul II
- Major shrine: Premonstratensian Church (Kassa)
- Feast: 7 September

Stephen Pongracz (Hungarian: Pongrácz István; 1584–1619) was a Hungarian Jesuit priest and martyr who is revered as a saint in the Catholic Church.

== Biography ==
Stephen Pongracz was born in Alvincz Castle in Principality of Transylvania, entered the Society of Jesus in 1602, and studied in Bohemia and Austria. He had been ordained for four years when he was sent to Kassa, Kingdom of Hungary, (today Košice, Slovakia) with fellow Jesuit Melchior Grodziecki.

The two Jesuits were working in small towns when they heard the news that a Calvinist army was marching on Kassa in an attempt to expand the territory of Gabriel Bethlen, prince of Transylvania. The two Jesuits returned to Kassa where they were joined by a diocesan priest, Fr. Marko Krizin. The Transylvanian army took control of the city on 5 September 1619, and immediately confined the three priests to the Jesuit residence. Before dawn on 7 September, soldiers broke into their quarters and demanded that they apostatize and accept Calvinism. When the priests refused to do so, the soldiers began to torture them and finally beheaded them.

The bodies of the martyrs were recovered, after negotiations with Gabriel Bethlen, and were buried in the vicinity of Kassa. In 1636, they were moved to Nagyszombat (today Trnava, Slovakia).

== Veneration and canonization ==
The cause of beatification of the Kassa martyrs began in 1628 and they were beatified on 15 January 1905 by Pope Pius X. Pope John Paul II canonized them on 2 July 1995 in Košice during a pastoral visit to Slovakia. Their feast day is on 7 September, the liturgical calendar of the Jesuit order has an additional feast of the Martyrs of the Reformation in Europe on 19 January.

== See also ==
- List of Jesuits
