= Gabriel Amard =

French politician (born 1967)

Member of the National Assembly for Rhône's 6th constituency
- Incumbent
- Assumed office 22 June 2022
- Preceded by: Bruno Bonnell

Mayor of Viry-Châtillon
- In office 1995–2006

Personal details
- Born: 5 May 1967 (age 59) Juvisy-sur-Orge, Seine-et-Oise, France
- Party: La France Insoumise; NUPES
- Relatives: Jean-Luc Mélenchon (father-in-law)

Gabriel Amard (born 5 May 1967) is a French politician from La France Insoumise (NUPES). He has been member of the National Assembly for Rhône's 6th constituency from 2022 to 2024 and in September 2026 was elected to the French Senate, a first for LFI.

== See also ==
- List of deputies of the 16th National Assembly of France
