= Amar Garibović =

Serbian cross-country skier (1991–2010)

Personal information
- Born: 7 September 1991 Sjenica, SR Serbia, SFR Yugoslavia
- Died: 7 September 2010 (aged 19) near Sredanci, Croatia

Sport
- Sport: Skiing

Amar Garibović (Serbian Cyrillic: Амар Гарибовић; 7 September 1991 – 7 September 2010) was a Serbian cross-country skier who had competed since 2004. He finished 80th in the 15 km event at the 2010 Winter Olympics in Vancouver.

== Sports career ==
Garibović finished 109th in the individual sprint at the FIS Nordic World Ski Championships 2009 in Liberec.

His lone win was at a 10 km event in Bosnia and Herzegovina in 2009.

== Death ==
Garibović died in a car crash in Croatia on 7 September 2010, the day of his 19th birthday. Travelling eastbound on the A3 motorway on the way back home following a FIS roller skiing event in Oroslavje, the van containing Garibović, his brother Amor, their father Murat, and another skier Ajlan Rastić reportedly blew a tire in full speed on the stretch of the road near the village of Sredanci, thus losing control and overturning several times.
