= Marko Krizin =

Croatian priest, martyr and saint

Saint Marko Stjepan Krizin
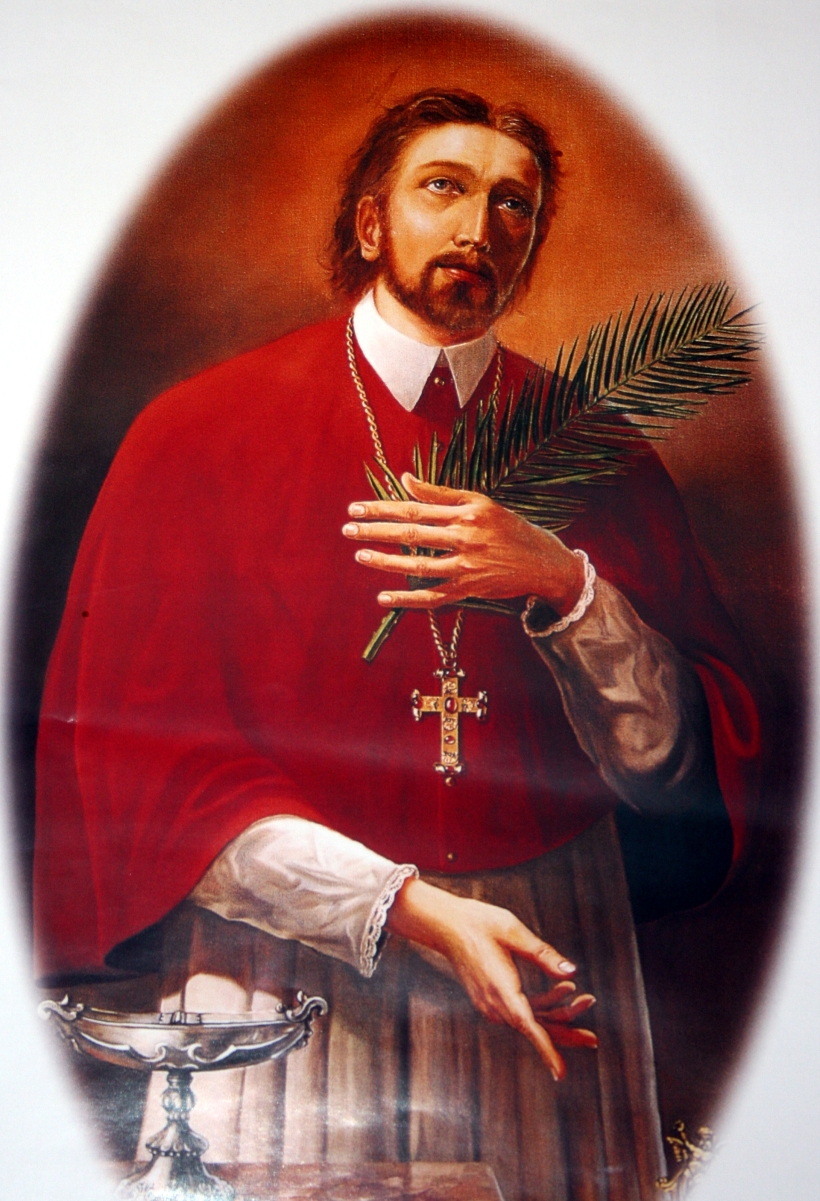

Martyr
- Born: Marko Stjepan Krizin c. 1588; Križevci, Kingdom of Croatia, Habsburg monarchy
- Died: 7 September 1619 (aged 29–30); Kassa, Kingdom of Hungary, Habsburg Monarchy
- Venerated in: Catholic Church
- Beatified: 15 January 1905, St. Peter's Basilica, Rome, Kingdom of Italy, by Pope Pius X
- Canonized: 2 July 1995, Košice, Slovakia, by Pope John Paul II
- Major shrine: Esztergom Basilica, Church of the Holy Trinity, Košice
- Feast: 7 September

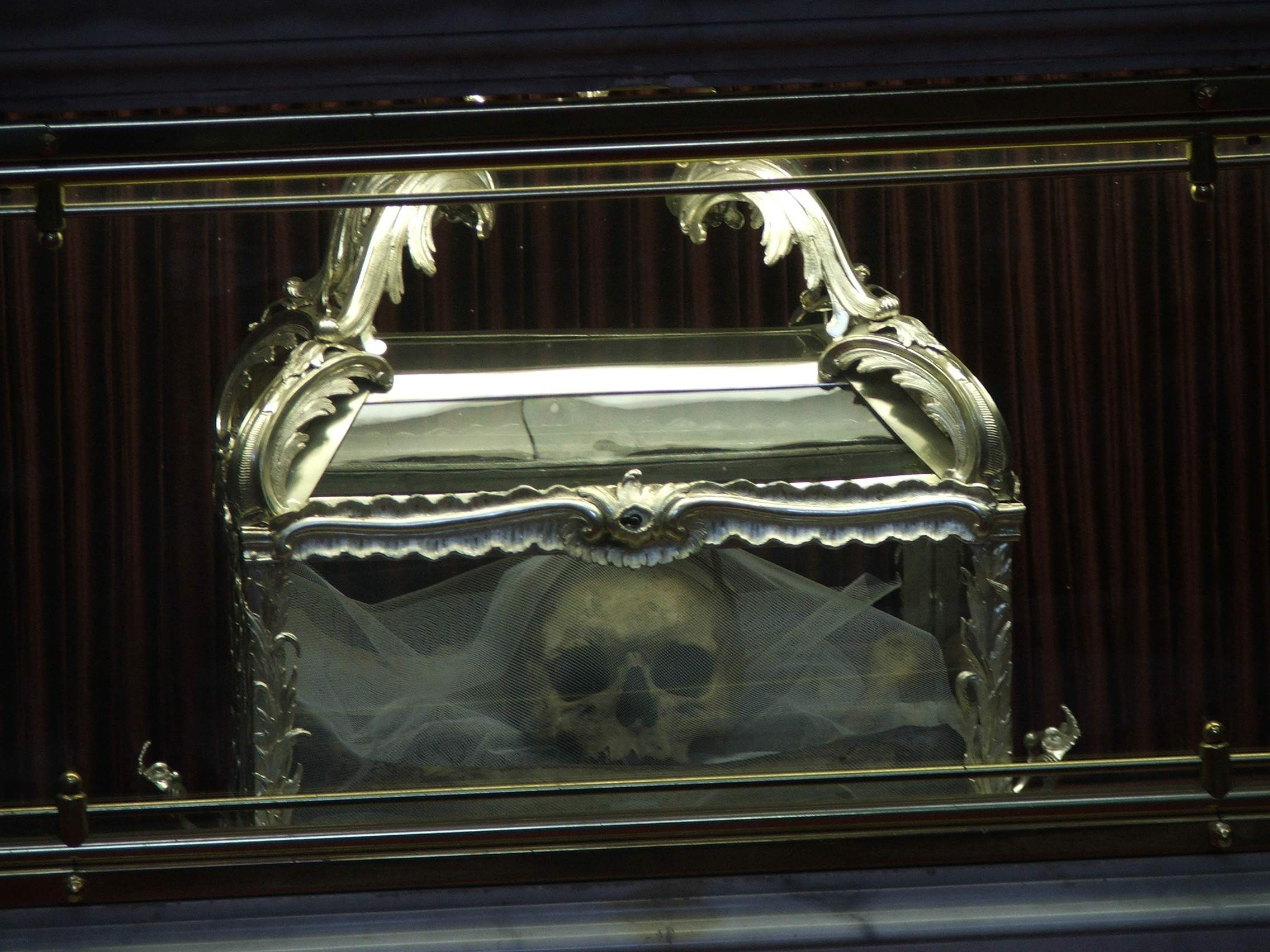
Relics of Marko Krizin at the Esztergom Basilica.

Marko Stjepan Krizin (c. 1588 – 7 September 1619), or Marko Križevčanin (Hungarian: Kőrösi Márk, lit. 'Mark of Križevci') was a Croatian Roman Catholic priest, professor of theology and missionary, who was active in the 17th century. In the course of the struggle between Catholicism and Calvinism in the region then, he was executed for his faith. He has been declared a saint by the Catholic Church, the third Croat to be so honored.

== Early life ==
Krizin was born in Križevci, in the Kingdom of Croatia. He started his studies in the Jesuit college in Vienna, and then later at the University of Graz, where he studied under Péter Pázmány and became a Doctor of Philosophy.

As a candidate for Holy Orders of the Diocese of Zagreb, Krizin then moved to Rome. He stayed at the Collegium Germanicum et Hungaricum while attending the Pontifical Gregorian University. He personally noted his nationality as Croatian in a document which is available in the college archives. As a student he was smart and considerate. He studied there from 1611 to 1615.

== Ministry ==
After ordination, Krizin returned to his diocese, where he stayed only a short while. Cardinal Péter Pázmány, Archbishop of Esztergom (then living in Nagyszombat – present-day Trnava – because of the continuing Ottoman occupation of much of Hungary), called him from Zagreb and appointed him both rector of the local seminary and canon of the cathedral chapter.

In early 1619, Krizin was sent to administer the estate of the former Benedictine Abbey of Széplak, near Kassa, Hungary (now Košice, Slovakia). Around the same time, the Calvinist Prince of Transylvania, Gábor Bethlen, led a nationalist uprising against the Austrian Habsburgs, who then ruled Hungary.

== Martyrdom ==
At the time, Kassa was a stronghold of Calvinism for Hungary. To help the Catholic minority, the governor of the city, Andrija Dóczi, a Catholic appointed by Emperor Matthias, brought two Jesuit priests to Kassa: István Pongrácz and Melchior Grodziecki. Their presence caused unrest among the Calvinist majority of Kassa.

In September 1619, the city came under siege by the forces of the commander of the Calvinist army, George I Rákóczi. On 5 September Dóczi was betrayed by the mercenary forces defending the city and was handed over by the city authorities to him. His Protestant supporters then declared Bethlen "head" of Hungary and the protector of the Protestants. At that time Marko was staying at the then-Jesuit Church of the Holy Trinity, in the company of the two Jesuits ministering to the Catholics of the city. The Calvinist troops arrested the three priests at once. They were then left without food and water for three days.

During this time, the fate of the Catholic population was being determined. At the instigation of a Calvinist minister named Alvinczi, the head of the City Council, Reyner, was demanding the execution of all Catholics of the city. The majority of Protestants, however, were opposed to such a slaughter. The execution of the priests, however, was approved by them.

The commander promised Marko Krizin a church estate if he renounced the Catholic Church and converted to Calvinism. Krizin refused. All three were then tortured and soon beheaded.

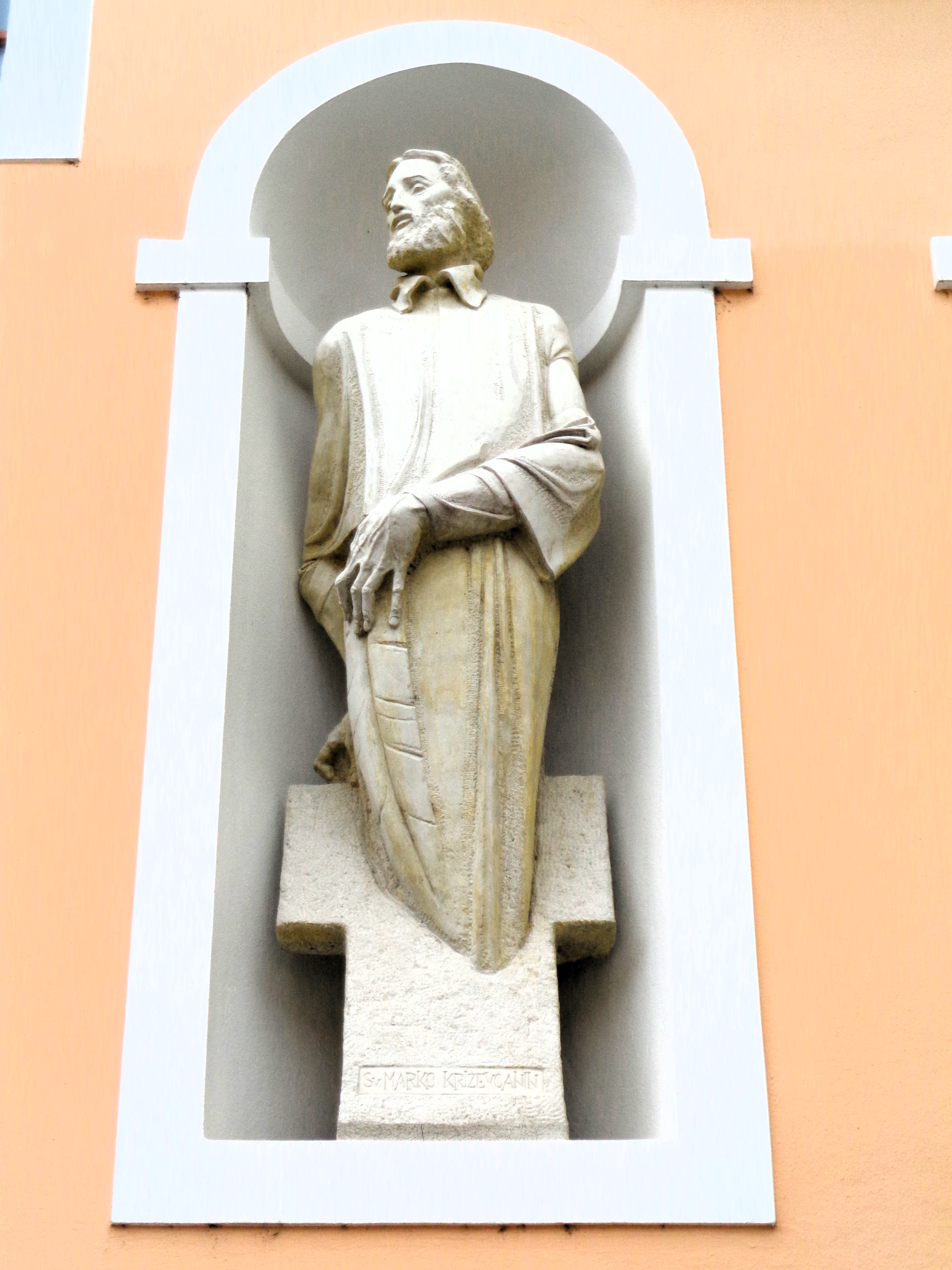
Krizin's statue at the Varaždin Cathedral

The news about their martyrdom stormed across Hungary, shocking both Catholics and Protestants alike. Despite many pleas, Prince Gabriel refused to allow them to be buried them in consecrated ground. Only after being asked by Countess Katalina Pálffy, six months later, did he allow them to have a proper burial.

== Legacy ==
The three priests were beatified on January 15, 1905 by Pope Pius X. The canonization of the three Košice martyrs was proclaimed by Pope John Paul II on July 2, 1995 in Košice. The remains of the Košice martyrs now rest in various locations, including the Basilica of Esztergom and the Ursuline Church of St. Anna in Trnava.

The feast day of Saint Marko Križevčanin is September 7. It is regularly celebrated with a week of festivities in Križevci.
