= Pierre de Bénouville =

French general

Member of the French National Assembly for Paris
- In office 1970–1993
- Preceded by: Pierre Bourgoin
- Succeeded by: Jean de Gaulle

Personal details
- Born: 8 August 1914 Amsterdam, Netherlands
- Died: 5 December 2001 (aged 87) Paris, France
- Party: RPR

Pierre de Bénouville (8 August 1914 – 5 December 2001) was a French Army officer, member of the Resistance, author, and politician.

In 1941 he was arrested by the Vichy police for trying to join the Free France Forces, which led him to dedicate himself to the resistance and create the Radio-Patrie movement. In 1943 the movement was absorbed into the Mouvements unis de la Résistance, so he became a member of the executive committee, and he later fought in Italy in 1944. For his work with the Resistance during World War Two, he was awarded the Legion of Honour.

He was a member of the French National Assembly in the 1950s for Ille-et-Vilaine, but would later represent Paris from 1970 to 1993.
