= 233 Spanish Martyrs =

The 233 Spanish Martyrs, also referred to as The Martyrs of Valencia or Jose Aparico Sanz and 232 Companions, were a group of martyrs from the Spanish Civil War, who were beatified in March 2001 by Pope John Paul II. This was the largest number of persons beatified at once, up to that time. They originated from all parts of Spain but mostly served and died in the Archdiocese of Valencia.

== Background ==
The 233 martyrs were clergy, religious and lay persons of the diocese of Valencia who were executed during the Red Terror of the Spanish Civil War. Some 6,000 clergy and religious were executed in Spain during this period; of these over 2,000 have been proposed for canonization. They are regarded by the Roman Catholic Church as Martyrs of the Spanish Civil War.

The 233 martyrs were made up of 16 separate causes, mostly groups but also some individuals who have been proposed for canonization. The earliest cause was opened in 1952 (that of Tomas Sitjar Fortia and his companions). Most causes were opened in the 1950s, though none were accepted by the CCS until 1990. The most recent cause (Maria Giner Gomis) was opened in 1995 and completed in five years. This was not the first group of Spanish martyrs beatified by John Paul II, though it was the largest up to that time.

== Beatification liturgy ==
The beatification of the entire group was enacted at a solemn liturgy celebrated in Rome on 11 March 2001, presided over by Pope John Paul II. In his homily he preached on the Transfiguration and pointed to the example of the martyr's sacrifice, and urged the church in Spain to be worthy of their example. He observed that they were men and women of all ages, and states (clergy, religious, lay persons) and that they had been killed for professing their faith. He pointed out that the martyrs had died forgiving their enemies, and expressed the hope that their example would help to remove the end of hatred and resentment still felt in Spain from those times.

John Paul II made special mention of Maria Teresa Ferragut Roig, one of the lay companions from Valencia; an 83-year-old woman, she was executed along with her four daughters (companions of Aurelio Ample Alcaide), all nuns in contemplative orders. He also made special mention of Francesco Castello Aleu, a 22 yr old layman, and German Gozalba, at age 23 just 2 months into the priesthood. He also made reference to Consuela and Maria Dolores Aguiar-Mella, two lay companions of Maria Baldilou Bullit, and the first people from Uruguay to be beatified.

== Controversy ==
The issue of the Spanish martyrs is controversial, not least because of the Spanish churches identification with the Nationalist cause during the civil war. However John Paul pointed out, generally and in specifics, that those who died in these cases “were not involved in political or ideological struggles nor did they want to be concerned with them” and that “they died solely for religious motives”.

== The 16 Causes ==
The 233 martyrs were advanced in 16 separate causes :

- Jose Aparicio Sanz and 73 companions, clergy and laypersons of the Diocese of Valencia, including Amalia Abad Casasempere
- Jacinto Serrano Lopez and 19 companions of the Dominican Order
- Pascual Fortuna Almela and 4 companions of the Friars Minor
- Alfonso Lopez Lopez and 6 companions of the Friars Minor Conventual
- Aurelio Ample Alcaide and 16 companions of the Friars Minor Capuchin
- Josefa Masia Ferragud, a nun of the Discalced Augustinians
- Tomas Sitjar Fortia and 11 companions of the Society of Jesus
- Jose Calasanz Marques and 28 companions of the Salesian Society, and two Daughters of Mary Help of Christians
- Vicente Cabanes Badenas and 18 companions of the Third Order of Friars Minor Capuchin
- Mariano García Méndez (Juan María de la Cruz), a priest of the Sacred Heart of Jesus
- Leonardo Olivera Buera and 5 companions of the Christian Brothers, also 24 Carmelite Sisters of Charity
- Maria Ricart Olmos, a nun of the Servite Order
- Maria Baldillou Bullit and 5 companions, nuns of the Sisters of the Pious Schools, and 2 laywomen of that order
- Josefa Ruano Garcia and Dolores Puig Bonany, nuns of the Little Sisters of the Abandoned Elderly
- Victoria Quintana Argos and 2 companions of the Capuchin Tertiary Sisters of the Holy Family
- Maria Giner Gomis, a Claretian Sister
- Francisco Castello y Aleu, layman of Catholic Action in Lleida

== The 233 martyrs ==
=== Diocesan Clergy ===
1. Matías Manuel Albert Ginés (3 October 1867 – 29 July 1936)
2. Joaquín Vilanova Camallonga (6 October 1888 – 29 July 1936)
3. Zósimo Izquierdo Gil (17 December 1895 – 30 July 1936)
4. Salvador Ferrandis Seguí (25 May 1880 – 3 August 1936)
5. Vicente Rubiols Castelló (13 March 1874 – 4 August 1936)
6. Antonio Silvestre Moya (26 October 1892 – 8 August 1936)
7. Salvador Estrugo Salves (12 October 1862 – 10 August 1936)
8. Félix Yuste Cava (21 February 1887 – 14 August 1936)
9. Carmelo Sastre Sastre (21 December 1890 – 15 August 1936)
10. Vicente María Izquierdo Alcón (24 May 1891 – 18 August 1936)
11. Francisco De Paula Ibáñez Ibáñez (22 September 1876 – 19 August 1936)
12. Fernando González Añon (17 February 1886 – 27 August 1936)
13. Ramón Martí Soriano (7 October 1902 – 27 August 1936)
14. Alfonso Sebastiá Viñals (27 May 1910 – 1 September 1936)
15. Francisco Sendra Ivars (23 April 1899 – 4 September 1936)
16. Diego Llorca Llopis (2 July 1896 – 6 September 1936)
17. José Toledo Pellicer (14 July 1909 – 10 September 1936)
18. José María Segura Penadés (13 October 1896 – 11 September 1936)
19. Pascual Penades Jornet (3 January 1894 – 15 September 1936)
20. Juan Ventura Solsona (c. 1875 – 17 September 1936)
21. José García Mas (11 June 1896 – 18 September 1936)
22. Fernando García Sendra (31 March 1905 – 18 September 1936)
23. Vicente Pelufo Corts (26 February 1868 – 21 September 1936)
24. Germán Gozalbo Andreu (30 August 1913 – 22 September 1936)
25. Vicente Sicluna Hernández (31 October 1859 – 22 September 1936))
26. Vicente Ballester Far (4 February 1888 – 23 September 1936)
27. Pascual Ferrer Botella (9 November 1894 – 24 September 1936)
28. José María Ferrándiz Hernández (11 August 1879 – 24 September 1936)
29. José Fenollosa Alcaina (16 March 1903 – 27 September 1936)
30. Elías Carbonell Molla (20 November 1869 – 2 October 1936)
31. Juan Carbonell Molla (6 June 1874 – 2 October 1936)
32. Enrique Morant Pellicer (13 October 1908 – 3 October 1936)
33. José Canet Giner (24 August 1903 – 4 October 1936)
34. José González Huguet (23 January 1874 – 12 October 1936)
35. Ramón Esteban Bou Pascual (12 October 1906 – 15 October 1936)
36. José Ruiz Bruixola (30 March 1857 – 29 October 1936)
37. Leonardo Olivera Buera (6 March 1889 – 23 October 1936)
38. Gonzalo Viñes Masip (19 January 1883 – 10 December 1936)
39. José Aparicio Sanz (12 March 1893 – 29 December 1936)
40. Enrique Juan Requena (2 March 1907 – 29 December 1936)

=== Roman Catholic Laity ===
1. Carlos López Vidal (1 November 1894 – 6 August 1936)
2. Rafael Alonso Gutiérrez (14 June 1890 – 11 August 1936)
3. Carlos Díaz Gandía (25 December 1907 – 11 August 1936)
4. María Climent Mateu (30 May 1887 – 20 August 1936)
5. Juan Bautista Faubel Cano (10 January 1889 – 28 August 1936)
6. Arturo Ros Montalt (26 October 1901 – 28 August 1936)
7. Pascual Torres Lloret (23 January 1885 – 6 September 1936)
8. Marino Blanes Giner (19 September 1888 – 8 September 1936)
9. Ismael Escrihuela Esteve (20 May 1902 – 8 September 1936)
10. María Dolores Aguiar-Mella Díaz (29 March 1897 – 19 September 1936)
11. Consuelo Aguiar-Mella Díaz (29 March 1898 – 19 September 1936)
12. Francisca Cualladó Baixauli (3 December 1890 – 19 September 1936)
13. Vicente Galbis Gironés (9 September 1910 – 21 September 1936)
14. Manuel Torró García (2 July 1902 – 21 September 1936)
15. Josefina Moscardó Montalvá (10 April 1888 – 22 September 1936)
16. María Purificación Vidal Pastor (14 September 1892 – 22 September 1936)
17. Sofía Ximénez Ximénez del Río (11 October 1876 – 23 September 1936)
18. José Ramón Ferragud Girbes (10 October 1887 – 24 September 1936)
19. Encarnación Gil Valls (27 January 1888 – 24 September 1936)
20. Amalia Abad Casasempere De Maestre (11 December 1897 – 26 September 1936)
21. María Jordá Botella (26 January 1905 – 26 September 1936)
22. Herminia Martínez Amigó De Martínez (14 July 1887 – 27 September 1936)
23. Crescencia Valls Espí (6 June 1863 – 27 September 1936)
24. Francesc de Paula Castelló Aleu (19 April 1914 – 29 September 1936)
25. Florencia Caerols Martínez (20 February 1890 – 2 October 1936)
26. Ana María Aranda Riera (24 January 1888 – 14 October 1936)
27. Társila Córdoba Belda De Girona (8 May 1861 – 17 October 1936)
28. María Teresa Ferragud Roig De Masiá (14 January 1853 – 25 October 1936)
29. Salvador Damián Enguix Garés (29 September 1862 – 27 October 1936)
30. María Del Carmen Viel Ferrando (27 November 1893 – 5 November 1936)
31. José Medes Ferrís (13 January 1885 – 12 November 1936)
32. Juan Gonga Martínez (25 March 1912 – 13 November 1936)
33. Luis Campos Górriz (30 June 1905 – 28 November 1936)
34. María Del Olvido Noguera Albelda (20 December 1903 – 30 November 1936)
35. Luisa María Frías Cañizares (20 June 1896 – 6 December 1936)
36. José María Zabal Blasco (19 March 1898 – 8 December 1936)
37. Pilar Villalonga Villalba (22 January 1891 – 11 December 1936)
38. Pablo Meléndez Gonzalo (6 November 1876 – 23 December 1936)
39. José María Corbin Ferrer (26 December 1914 – 27 December 1936)
40. José Perpiñá Nácher (22 February 1911 – 29 December 1936)
41. María Luisa Montesinos Orduña (3 May 1901 – 28 January 1937)
42. Carmen Marie Anne García Moyon (13 September 1888 – 30 January 1937)

=== Order of Friars Minor Capuchin (Capuchin Franciscans) ===
1. José María Garrigues Hernández (Germán of Carcagente) (12 February 1895 – 10 August 1936)
2. Modesto García Martí (Modesto of Albocácer) (17 January 1880 – 13 August 1936)
3. Enrique García Beltrán (Enrique of Almazora) (16 March 1913 – 16 August 1936)
4. Luis Valls Matamales (Ambrosio of Benaguacil) (3 May 1870 – 24 August 1936)
5. Alejandro Más Ginester (Pedro of Benisa) (13 December 1876 – 25 August 1936)
6. José Ample Alcaide (Aurelio of Vinalesa) (3 February 1896 – 28 August 1936)
7. José Ferrer Adell (Joaquin of Albocácer) (23 April 1879 – 30 August 1936)
8. José Bleda Grau (Berardo of Lugar Nuevo de Fenollet) (23 July 1867 – 30 August 1936)
9. Julio Esteve Flors (Buenaventura of Puzol) (9 October 1897 – 25 September 1936)
10. Santiago Mestre Iborra (Santiago of Rafelbuñol) (10 April 1909 – 28 September 1936)
11. Mariano Climent Sanchis (Fidel of Puzol) (8 January 1856 – 28 September 1936)
12. Pedro Salcedo Puchades (Pacifico of Valencia) (23 February 1874 – 12 October 1936)

=== Capuchin Poor Clare Nuns (Capuchinesses) ===
1. María Vicenta (María Jesús) Masiá Ferragud (12 January 1882 – 25 October 1936)
2. María Joaquina (María Veronica) Masiá Ferragud (15 June 1884 – 25 October 1936)
3. María Felicidad Masiá Ferragud (29 August 1890 – 25 October 1936)
4. Milagros Ortells Gimeno (29 November 1882 – 20 November 1936)
5. Isabel Calduch Rovira (9 May 1882 – 13 April 1937)

=== Order of Friars Minor (Franciscans) ===
1. Pascual Fortuño Almela (3 March 1886 – 8 September 1936)
2. Plácido García Gilabert (1 January 1895 – 8 September 1936)
3. Salvador Mollar Ventura (27 March 1896 – 8 September 1936)
4. Alfredo Pellicer Muñoz (10 April 1914 – 8 September 1936)

=== Order of Friars Minor Conventual (Conventual Franciscans) ===
1. Modesto Vegas Vegas (24 February 1912 – 27 July 1936)
2. Dionisio Vicente Ramos (9 October 1871 – 31 July 1936)
3. Francisco Remón Játiva (22 September 1890 – 31 July 1936)
4. Federico (Alfonso) López López (16 November 1878 – 5 August 1936)
5. Eugenio (Miguel) Remón Salvador (7 September 1907 – 5 August 1936)
6. Candido (Pedro) Rivera Rivera (3 September 1912 – 6 September 1936)

=== Discalced Augustinian Nuns ===
1. Josefa Ramona (of the Purification) Masiá Ferragud (10 June 1897 – 25 October 1936)

=== Congregation of the Sacred Heart of Jesus (Dehonians) ===
1. Mariano García Méndez (Juan María of the Cross) (25 September 1891 – 23 August 1936)

=== Religious of Mary Immaculate (Claretian Missionary Sisters) ===
1. María Cinta Asunción Giner Gomis (María Patrocinio of Saint John) (4 January 1874 – 13 November 1936)

=== Order of the Servants of Mary (Servites) ===
1. María Francisca (María Guadalupe) Ricart Olmos (23 February 1881 – 2 October 1936)

=== Little Sisters of the Abandoned Elderly ===
1. Josefa Ruano García (Josefa of Saint John of God) (9 July 1854 – 8 September 1936)
2. Dolores Puig Bonany (María Dolores of Saint Eulalia) (12 June 1857 – 8 September 1936)

=== Sisters of the Pious Schools (Daughters of Mary - Escolapias) ===
1. Maria (of the Child Jesus) Baldillou Bullit (6 February 1905 – 8 August 1936)
2. Pascuala Gallén Martí (Presentación of the Holy Family) (21 September 1872 – 8 August 1936)
3. María Luisa (of Jesus) Girón Romera (25 August 1887 – 8 August 1936)
4. Nazaria Gómez Lezaun (Carmen of Saint Philip Neri) (18 July 1869 – 8 August 1936)
5. Antonia Riba Mestres (Climenta of Saint John the Baptist) (8 October 1893 – 8 August 1936)
6. María De La Encarnación (of Jesus) de la Yglesia de Varo (25 March 1891 In Cabra, Córdoba (Spain)

=== Capuchin Tertiary Fathers and Brothers of Our Lady of Sorrows (Amigonians) ===
1. José De Miguel Arahal (Bienvenido María of Dos Hermanas) (17 June 1887 – 1 August 1936)
2. Francisco Tomás Serer (10 October 1911 – 2 August 1936)
3. Agustín Hurtado Soler (Domingo María of Alboraya) (18 August 1872 – 15 August 1936)
4. José María Sanchís Mompó (Gabriel María of Benifaió) (8 October 1858 – 16 August 1936)
5. Florentín Pérez Romero (14 March 1902 – 23 August 1936)
6. Urbano Gil Sáez (9 March 1901 – 23 August 1936)
7. Vicente Cabanes Badenas (25 February 1908 – 30 August 1936)
8. Salvador Ferrer Cardet (Laureano María of Burriana) (13 August 1884 – 16 September 1936)
9. Manuel Ferrer Jordá (Benito María of Burriana) (26 November 1872 – 16 September 1936)
10. Pablo Martínez Robles (Bernardino María of Andújar) (28 January 1879 – 16 September 1936)
11. Timoteo Valero Pérez (24 January 1901 – 17 September 1936)
12. Salvador Chuliá Ferrandis (Ambrosio María of Torrent) (16 April 1866 – 18 September 1936)
13. Vicente Jaunzarás Gómez (Valentín María of Torrent) (6 March 1896 – 18 September 1936)
14. José María Llópez Mora (Recaredo María of Torrent) (22 August 1874 – 18 September 1936)
15. Vicente Gay Zarzo (Modesto María of Torrent) (19 January 1885 – 18 September 1936)
16. Justo Lerma Martínez (Francisco María of Torrent) (12 November 1886 – 18 September 1936)
17. Manuel Legua Martí (León María of Alaquàs) (23 April 1875 – 26 September 1936)
18. Crescencio García Pobo (15 April 1903 – 3 October 1936)
19. José Llosá Balaguer (23 August 1901 – 7 October 1936)

=== Capuchin Tertiary Sisters of the Holy Family (Amigonians) ===
1. Petra María Victoria Quintana Argos (Rosario of Soano) (13 May 1866 – 22 August 1936)
2. Manuela Justa Fernández Ibero (Serafina of Ochovi) (6 August 1872 – 22 August 1936)
3. María Fenollosa Alcaina (Francisca Javier of Rafelbunyol) (24 May 1901 – 28 September 1936)

=== Society of Jesus (Jesuits) ===
1. Tomàs Sitjar Fortiá (21 March 1866 – 19 August 1936)
2. Constantino Carbonell Sempere (12 April 1866 – 23 August 1936)
3. Ramón Grimaltos Monllor (3 March 1861 – 23 August 1936)
4. Pere Gelabert Amer (29 March 1887 – 23 August 1936)
5. Josep Tarrats Comaposada (29 August 1878 – 28 September 1936)
6. Pau Bori Puig (12 November 1864 – 29 September 1936)
7. Dario Hernández Morató (25 October 1880 – 29 September 1936)
8. Vicente Sales Genovés (15 October 1881 – 29 September 1936)
9. Narcis Basté Basté (16 December 1866 – 15 October 1936)
10. Alfredo Simón Colomina (8 March 1877 – 29 November 1936)
11. Juan Bautista Ferreres Boluda (28 November 1861 – 29 December 1936)

=== Order of Preachers (Dominicans) ===
1. Antonio Manuel López Couceiro (15 September 1869 – 29 July 1936)
2. Lucio Martínez Mancebo (28 July 1902 – 29 July 1936)
3. Felicísimo Díez González (26 November 1907 – 29 July 1936)
4. Saturio Rey Robles (12 December 1907 – 29 July 1936)
5. Tirso Manrique Melero (26 January 1877 – 29 July 1936)
6. Gumersindo Soto Barros (21 October 1869 – 29 July 1936)
7. Lamberto María De Navascués De Juan (18 May 1911 – 29 July 1936)
8. José María Muro Sanmiguel (26 October 1905 – 30 July 1936)
9. Joaquín Prats Baltueña (5 March 1915 – 30 July 1936)
10. Francisco Calvo Burillo (21 November 1881 – 1 August 1936)
11. Luis Urbano Lanaspa (3 June 1882 – 21 August 1936)
12. Ramon Peiró Victori (7 March 1891 – 21 August 1936)
13. Francisco Monzón Romeo (29 March 1912 – 28 August 1936)
14. Constantino Fernández Álvarez (7 February 1907 – 29 August 1936)
15. Josep Maria Vidal Segú (3 February 1912 – 25 September 1936)
16. Rafael Pardo Molina (28 October 1899 – 25 September 1936)
17. Santiago Meseguer Burillo (1 May 1885 – 25 November 1936)
18. Jacinto Serrano López (30 July 1901 – 25 November 1936)

=== Carmelite Sisters of Charity “Vedruna” ===
1. Elvira (of the Nativity of Our Lady) Torrentallé Paraire (29 June 1883 – 19 August 1936)
2. Rosa (of Our Lady of Good Counsel) Pedret Rull (5 December 1864 – 19 August 1936)
3. Maria (of Our Lady of Providence) Calaf Miracle (18 December 1871 – 19 August 1936)
4. María Desamparados (of the Blessed Sacrament) Giner Sixta (13 December 1877 – 19 August 1936)
5. Francisca (of Saint Teresa) De Amézua Ibaibarriaga (9 March 1881 – 19 August 1936)
6. Teresa (of the Good Shepherdess) Chambó Palet (5 February 1881 – 19 August 1936)
7. Agueda (of Our Lady of Virtues) Hernández Amorós (5 January 1893 – 19 August 1936)
8. María Dolores (of Saint Francis Xavier) Vidal Cervera (31 January 1895 – 19 August 1936)
9. María De Las Nieves (of the Holy Trinity) Crespo López (17 September 1897 – 19 August 1936)
10. Ascensión (of Saint Joseph Calasanz) Lloret Marcos (21 May 1879 – 7 September 1936)
11. Purificación (of Saint Joseph) Ximénez Y Ximénez (3 February 1871 – 23 September 1936)
12. María Josefa (of Saint Sophia) Del Río Messa (30 April 1895 – 23 September 1936)
13. Niceta (of Saint Prudentius) Plaja Xifra (31 October 1863 – 24 November 1936)
14. Paula (of Saint Anastasia) Isla Alonso (28 June 1863 – 24 November 1936)
15. Antonia (of Saint Timothy) Gosens Sáez De Ibarra (17 January 1870 – 24 November 1936)
16. Daría (of Saint Sophia) Campillo Paniagua (8 September 1873 – 24 November 1936)
17. Erundina (of Our Lady of Mount Carmel) Colino Vega (23 July 1883 – 24 November 1936)
18. María Consuelo (of the Blessed Sacrament) Cuñado González (2 January 1884 – 24 November 1936)
19. María Concepción (of Saint Ignatius) Odriozola Zabalía (8 February 1882 – 24 November 1936)
20. Feliciana (of Our Lady of Mount Carmel) De Uribe Orbe (8 March 1893 – 24 November 1936)
21. Concepción (of Saint Magdalene) Rodríguez Fernández (13 December 1895 – 24 November 1936)
22. Justa (of the Immaculata) Maiza Goicoechea (13 July 1897 – 24 November 1936)
23. Clara (of Our Lady of Hope) Ezcurra Urrutia (17 August 1896 – 24 November 1936)
24. Cándida (of Our Lady of Angels) Cayuso González (5 January 1901 – 24 November 1936)

=== Brothers of the Christian Schools (De La Salle Brothers) ===
1. Andrés (Honorato Andrés) Zarraquino Herrero (18 April 1908 – 22 October 1936)
2. Álvaro (Florencio Martín) Ibáñez Lázaro (12 June 1913 – 22 October 1936)
3. Pedro (Ambrosio León) Lorente Vicente (7 January 1914 – 22 October 1936)
4. Julián (Elías Julián) Torrijo Sánchez (17 November 1900 – 22 November 1936)
5. Francisco (Bertrán Francisco) Lahoz Moliner (15 October 1912 – 22 November 1936)

=== Salesians of Don Bosco ===
1. Xavier Bordas Piferrer (4 September 1914 – 23 July 1936)
2. Jaime Ortiz Alzueta (24 May 1913 – 27 July 1936)
3. Felipe Hernández Martínez (14 March 1913 – 27 July 1936)
4. Zacarías Abadía Buesa (5 November 1913 – 27 July 1936)
5. José Caselles Moncho (8 August 1907 – 27 July 1936)
6. Josep Castell Camps (12 October 1902 – 28 July 1936)
7. José Calasanz Marqués (23 November 1872 – 29 July 1936)
8. Sergio Cid Pazo (24 April 1884 – 30 July 1936)
9. Jaume Buch Canals (9 April 1889 – 31 July 1936)
10. Francisco Bandrés Sánchez (24 April 1896 – 2 August 1936)
11. Josep Batalla Parramon (15 January 1873 – 4 August 1936)
12. Josep Rabasa Betanachs (26 July 1862 – 4 August 1936)
13. Gil Rodicio Rodicio (20 March 1888 – 4 August 1936)
14. Juan Martorell Soria (1 September 1889 – 10 August 1936)
15. Miquel Domingo Cendra (1 March 1909 – 12 August 1936)
16. Josep Bonet Nadal (26 December 1875 – 13 August 1936)
17. Jaume Bonet Nadal (4 August 1884 – 18 August 1936)
18. Pedro Mesonero Rodríguez (29 May 1912 – 21 August 1936)
19. Fèlix Vivet Trabal (23 January 1911 – 25 August 1936)
20. Álvaro Sanjuán Canet (26 April 1908 – 2 October 1936)
21. Ángel Ramos Velázquez (9 March 1876 – 13 October 1936)
22. Eliseo García García (25 August 1907 – 19 November 1936)
23. José Otín Aquilué (22 December 1901 – c. November 1936)
24. Antonio Martín Hernández (18 July 1885 – 9 December 1936)
25. Recaredo De Los Ríos Fabregat (11 January 1893 – 9 December 1936)
26. Julián Rodríguez Sánchez (16 October 1896 – 9 December 1936)
27. José Giménez López (31 October 1904 – 9 December 1936)
28. Agustín García Calvo (3 February 1905 – 9 December 1936)
29. Juli Junyer Padern (30 October 1892 – 26 April 1938)

=== Salesian Cooperators ===
1. Alexandre Planas Saurí (31 October 1878 – 19 November 1936)

=== Daughters of Mary, Help of Christians (Salesian Sisters of Don Bosco) ===
1. Carmen Moreno Benítez (24 August 1885 – 6 September 1936)
2. Amparo Carbonell Muñoz (9 November 1893 – 6 September 1936)
