= Jornet =

Jornet is a Catalan surname. Notable people with the surname include:

- Josep Maria Benet i Jornet (born 1940), Spanish playwright and screenwriter
- Kílian Jornet Burgada (born 1987), Catalunyan extreme sports athlete
- St. Teresa of Jesus Jornet (1843–1897), Spanish foundress of the Little Sisters of the Poor
