= Saturnino López Novoa =

Spanish Catholic priest

Venerable Saturnino López Novoa
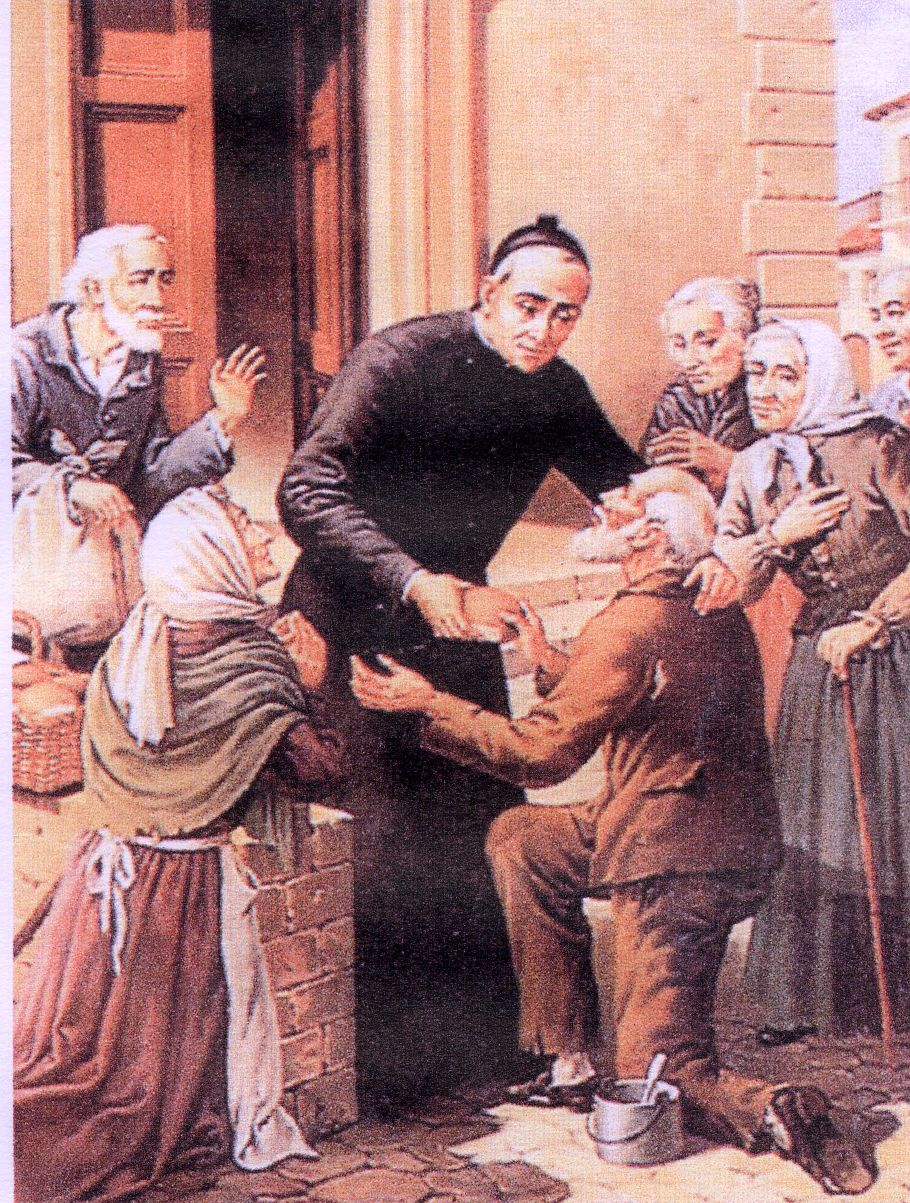
- Saturnino Lopez

Priest
- Born: 29 November 1830; Sigüenza, Guadalajara, Spain
- Died: 12 March 1905 (aged 74); Huesca, Spain
- Venerated in: Roman Catholic Church
- Attributes: Priest's cassock
- Patronage: Hermanitas de los Ancianos Desamparados

Saturnino López Novoa (29 November 1830 – 12 March 1905) was a Spanish Catholic priest and the co-founder of the Hermanitas de los Ancianos Desamparados, which he established with Teresa Jornet e Ibars.

He lived with his aunt since his childhood and after he was ordained as a priest served his uncle who had been appointed as a bishop for the Huesca Diocese. Novoa served his uncle as his aide until the latter died in Rome during the First Vatican Council, at which Novoa served as his uncle's theological consultant. He continued to minister to the poor and ill following his uncle's death and set out establishing new houses and facilities for his religious congregation.

Novoa's beatification process had been called for since his death since the people in Huesca and Barbastro came to revere him as a saint. The process was not launched until the 1990s when he became titled as a Servant of God. The cause progressed in mid-2014 when Pope Francis recognized his heroic virtue and titled him as Venerable.

== Life ==
Saturnino López Novoa was born in Sigüenza in Guadalajara on 29 November 1830 at 9:00am as the first of three children to Julián López Muñoz and Ildefonsa Novoa Bueno (1802-1835). His two brothers following him were Silverio (b. 1832) and Justa. Novoa was baptized on 30 November and named in honor of Saint Saturnino. His mother died in 1835 when he was five after she gave birth to Justa who died just over two weeks later. One cousin of his was María Magro Novoa.

His father Julián desired becoming a priest to the point that he had received the tonsure and had been doing his philosophical studies. But he decided to do music and work with the cathedral choir before his ordination though in 1827 abandoned his intention to become a priest and instead decided to be married.

It was after his mother died that he went to Berlanga de Duero where he lived with his maternal aunt Manuela (born in 1771 in Las Inviernas). He accompanied Manuela in visiting the poor and distributing bread to them that she baked at home for them. His aunt was married with eleven children who all died as infants or children; her husband Juan de Dios Gil (Novoa's uncle) was a shoemaker. In 1838 he and his aunt relocated to live with Novoa's uncle Basilio Gil i Bueno who had been ordained as a priest in 1835. In autumn 1838 he started his studies in Latin under the canon Miguel Ormazábal and it was just after this that his father remarried in 1840 to Antonia Arauzo (their child Guillermo was born in 1841). It was around 1840 that he received both his First Communion and Confirmation. His father also worked in the local council but was fired and so managed a store to provide income for his newborn son and wife.

He commenced his ecclesial studies in 1842 and he was able to assume the cassock for the first time following the obtaining of a scholarship on 28 September 1846. Novoa was given the tonsure alongside his brother Silverio in Sigüenza on 21 June 1848 while their aunt Manuela died on 25 January 1849 but he did not hear this news until less than a week later. He finished his ecclesial studies (which included Greek) in 1852 but could not be ordained at that time since he had not reached the canonical age nor had he received a dispensation for such. On 12 March 1853 he received the minor orders while being made a subdeacon on 3 March 1854 and then a deacon on 2 June. Novoa received his ordination to the priesthood on 22 September 1854 (receiving those three ordinations from the Bishop of Huesca Pedro de Zarandía i Endara since the Bishop of Barbastro was ill) and celebrated his first Mass in October just outside of Barbastro at a Marian shrine.

In September 1856 he attended his brother Silverio's first Mass in his birthplace but had to return there a few months later for his father's funeral. In June 1857 in Toledo he did his examination for his master's degree in theological studies and in late August 1861 was in Toledo once more for an examination for his doctorate which was conducted in Latin on the theme "De Deo uno". His uncle Basilio Gil i Bueno became the Bishop of Huesca on 23 December 1861 and he appointed Novoa as his private aide to help him manage diocesan affairs; Novoa had mixed feelings about this since he came to love Barbastro and did not wish to leave for Huesca. Novoa was present for his uncle's episcopal consecration on 27 April 1862 and his installation that 1 June. It was on 15 June that he was incardinated in the Huesca diocese and to celebrate gave alms to the poor.

In 1860 his half-brother Guillermo began ecclesial studies after his wife died and he would be ordained as a priest in 1864. It was not long after that in 1865 that his brother Silverio died. The Spanish Glorious Revolution saw Novoa and his uncle go into exile from Huesca and this exile lasted from 6 October 1868 until 13 September 1869; the pair received a triumphant welcome upon their return when the crisis subsided in the region. He aided his uncle as a theological consultant during the First Vatican Council in Rome during which his uncle died on 12 February 1870; his uncle's health was frail but the bishop had insisted on attending the Council. The pair arrived in Rome on 27 November 1869 ahead of schedule so decided to visit the major basilicas and the relics of Saint Lawrence. Following his uncle's death came further heartbreak for Novoa: his niece Saturnina (b. 1860 and whose father was Guillermo) died in 1880 while her father died in 1882. On 25 December 1882 he adopted the infant Francisco Olivan Palacin (born that 14 December) after his mother died that 20 December. He hired a nurse to tend to the child but baptized him and then confirmed him when he turned five. The nurse's services ceased on Christmas Eve in 1884 but he himself continued to raise the child as if he were his own. He also gave the child his First Communion in December 1891 while that child would in the following decades migrate to Mexico where he was married and studied medicine.

Novoa founded various religious confraternities in Huesca. He co-founded his religious congregation alongside his friend Saint Teresa Jornet Ibars on 27 January 1873 with the first house being established in Barbastro. In 1885 he was decorated with the Orden Civil de la Beneficencia Cross in recognition for his extensive humanitarian efforts in a cholera epidemic that struck Huesca. Novoa received papal approval from Pope Leo XIII for his order on 24 August 1887 but did not receive news of it until that September. It was a decade later on 30 August 1897 that he presided over the funeral for his friend Jornet who had died after a period of ill health.

In February 1903 he organized his personal archives and completed his last will which he signed on 25 March knowing that his health was failing at a gradual pace. In late summer he felt a bit better so found he could take short walks and answer correspondence. He suffered from back pains which forced him to bed that July and he was able to resume the celebration of Mass on 23 July when he said one for Pope Leo XIII's soul following the latter's death. He did not leave his home much following this but on Christmas Eve in 1904 his condition worsened due to having contracted pneumonia. He celebrated his final Mass on 23 February 1905 following which his condition kept him confined to his bed from which he found he could not get out of. On 11 March he received the Viaticum and then received the Anointing of the Sick that evening in a lucid state while suffering from great pain. Novoa died from pneumonia at 5:00am on 12 March. His remains were exhumed on 6 May 1912 and relocated to the order's motherhouse and then interred in a different area in the motherhouse on 25 August 1913.

== Beatification process ==
The beatification process launched after the forum for the diocesan process was transferred on 21 November 1997 from the Huesca diocese to the Valencia archdiocese where the process was launched on 7 November 1998; this investigation was concluded on 2 April 2000 while also the Congregation for the Causes of Saints issued the "nihil obstat" (no objections to the cause) decree and titled Novoa as a Servant of God. The C.C.S. validated the process on 23 November 2001 as having complied with their regulations on conducting causes and in 2011 and in 2012 received the two parts to the official Positio dossier. This dossier contained all relevant evidence compiled during the diocesan process that would attest to Novoa's holiness.

Historical consultants assessed and approved the cause on 21 June 2011 while nine theologians voiced their approval to the cause on 11 June 2013. The C.C.S. cardinal and bishop members also approved the cause on 17 June 2014 while on 8 July he became titled as Venerable after Pope Francis issued a decree acknowledging Novoa's life of heroic virtue.

The current postulator for this cause is Dr. Silvia Mónica Correale.
