= María Teresa Ferragut Roig =

Spanish Roman Catholic martyr of the Spanish Civil War and blessed

Blessed María Teresa Ferragut Roig Martyr
- Born: 14 January 1853; Algemesí, Valencia, Spain
- Died: 25 October 1936 (aged 83); Alzira, Valencia, Spain
- Venerated in: Catholic Church
- Beatified: 11 March 2001, Saint Peter's Square, Vatican City by Pope John Paul II
- Feast: 25 October; 22 September (with the 233 Spanish Martyrs)

María Teresa Ferragut Roig (14 January 1853 – 25 October 1936) was a Spanish Roman Catholic laywoman and martyr, killed near Alzira, Valencia during the anti-clerical persecutions in Republican-controlled Spain at the beginning of the Spanish Civil War. She was beatified in 2001 by Pope John Paul II as part of the group known as the 233 Spanish Martyrs, recognized as having been killed in odium fidei.

== Early life and family ==
María Teresa Ferragut Roig, also spelled Ferragud Roig, was born on 14 January 1853 in Algemesí (Valencia), Spain. On 23 November 1872, she married Vicente Silverio Masià. Her only son entered the Order of Friars Minor Capuchin under the name Serafín of Algemesí, while five of her six daughters entered enclosed religious life. María de Jesús, María Verónica, and María Felicidad joined the Capuchin Poor Clares at Agullent (Valencia). Another daughter, whose name is not recorded, entered the convent of San Julián in Valencia and María Josefa joined the Discalced Augustinians at Benigànim. Only one daughter, Purificación, remained a laywoman.

Ferragut was active in lay Catholic organizations, including Catholic Action and charitable initiatives such as the Society of Saint Vincent de Paul. Her spirituality was centered on daily Mass and devotion to the Eucharist, the Virgin Mary, and the Sacred Heart of Jesus.

== Spanish Civil War and martyrdom ==
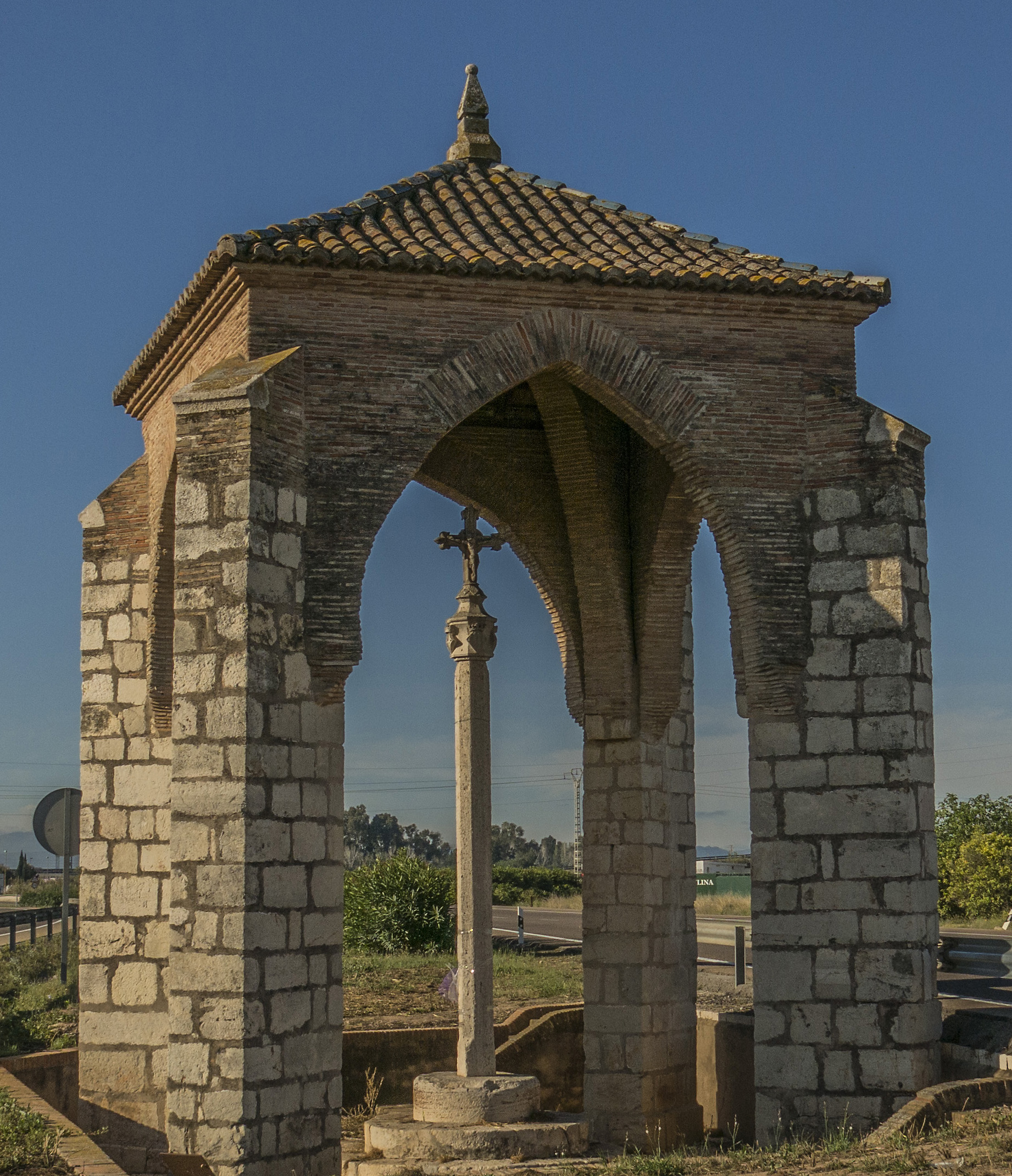
Wayside cross porch of Alzira

Following the outbreak of the Spanish Civil War in 1936, anti-clerical violence intensified in Republican-controlled areas. Ferragut sheltered her daughters, who were members of religious orders, in her home. On 19 October 1936, militia members raided Ferragut’s home and arrested her along with her four daughters. Ferragut refused to abandon her daughters and they were detained together in the Cistercian convent of Fons Salutis in Algemesí, which had been converted into a prison. During their imprisonment, their captors reportedly attempted to pressure them to renounce their religious vocations, but they refused.

On the night of 25 October 1936, they were transported by truck to the nearby town of Alzira, approximately 8 kilometres away. The vehicle stopped at the entrance to the town, at a site known as Cruz Cubierta, where a wayside cross porch marks, according to local tradition, the site where King James I of Aragon died. According to testimony preserved in the beatification process, she chose to be executed last and encouraged her daughters with the words:

"My daughters, do not be afraid; it is only a moment, and Heaven will be forever."

— Maria Teresa Ferragut Roig,

Ferragut Roig was executed by a firing squad with her four daughters, three of whom were beatified with her:

- María de Jesús (Vicenta Masiá Ferragut)
- María Verónica (Joaquina Masiá Ferragut)
- María Felicidad (María Felicidad Masiá Ferragut)
- Josefa de la Purificación (Raimunda Masiá Ferragut)

Their bodies were taken to the cemetery of Alzira, and on 2 July 1939 were transferred to Algemesí and interred in the crypt of the convent of Fons Salutis. On 16 April 1961, their remains were translated to the parish church of Saint Pius X in Algemesí.

== Beatification ==
Ferragut’s death was recognized by the Catholic Church as martyrdom in odium fidei ("in hatred of the faith"). In December 1958, the diocesan inquiry into their martyrdom was incorporated, at the request of the postulator of the Augustinian Recollects, into the cause of the Capuchin Aurelio de Vinalesa and his companions. The Archdiocese of Valencia concluded the first phase of the process on 13 April 1959.

Ferragut was beatified within a large collective group reflecting the diversity of Catholic victims of the Spanish Civil War. The cohort included clergy, religious, and laypeople, including married men and women, youth and other members of Catholic organizations. Her specific cause belonged to the juridical group of José Aparicio Sanz and 73 companions, which was incorporated into the broader beatification of 233 martyrs.

Ferragut's case is notable for representing martyrdom of a lay female within a familial context, since she was executed alongside four daughters who had entered religious life. In the beatification homily of 11 March 2001, Pope John Paul II explicitly mentioned her case, highlighting her maternal role and her decision to accompany and spiritually support her daughters in their martyrdom. In the Latin decree, she is listed as a lay mother (mater familias) killed together with her daughters. Her feast day is observed on 25 October (individual commemoration), the collective commemoration of Spanish Civil War martyrs is on 22 September.

In 2011, relics of Ferragut, together with those of two other contemporary martyrs, Carlos López Vidal and Pascual Penadés Jornet, were placed in a reliquary at the foot of the altar of the Church of St. Marina, the Virgin in Torrebaja.
