= Silla, Spain =

Silla
- Municipality
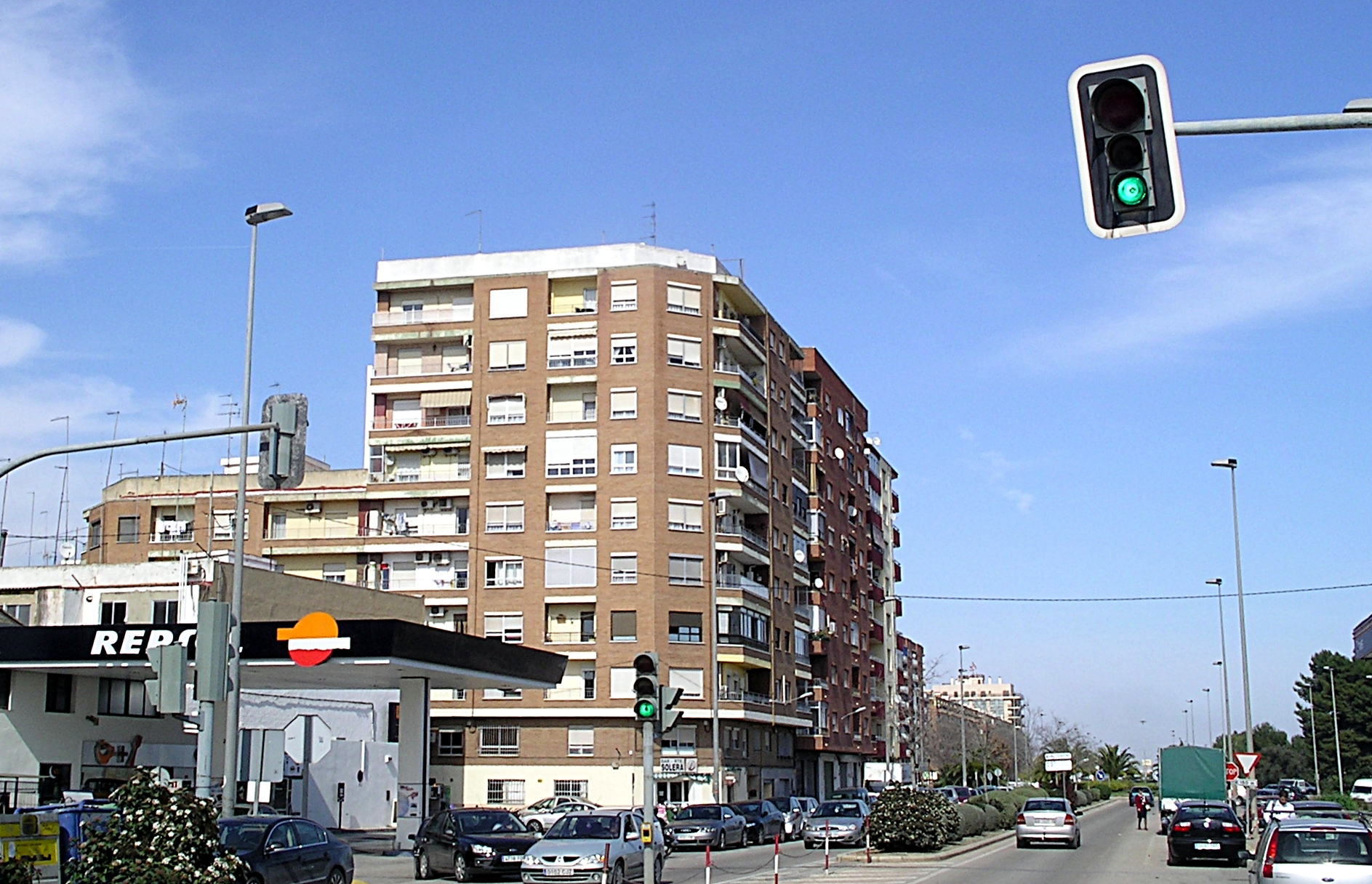

- Flag Coat of arms

- Location in Spain
- Coordinates: 39°21′40″N 0°24′41″W
- Country: Spain
- Autonomous community: Valencian Community
- Province: Valencia
- Comarca: Horta Sud
- Judicial district: Carlet

Government
  - Alcalde: Vicent Zaragozá Alberola (PSPV-PSOE)

Area
  - Total: 25 km^{2} (9.7 sq mi)
- Elevation: 8 m (26 ft)

Population (2025-01-01)
  - Total: 20,482
  - Density: 820/km^{2} (2,100/sq mi)
- Demonym(s): Siller, Sillera
- Time zone: UTC+1 (CET)
  - Summer (DST): UTC+2 (CEST)
- Postal code: 46460
- Official language(s): Valencian and Spanish
- Website: Official website

Silla (Valencian: ['siʎa]) is a municipality in the comarca of Horta Sud in the Valencian Community, Spain. According to the 2014 census, The municipality has a population of 18,644 inhabitants.

The town has six casales falleros, for the different Fallas. Silla has different cultural associations. Because of the great immigration of Andalusian people in the 1960s, Silla has got a Casa de Andalucia.

In Silla there is a very important local theater school. Founded in 1985, it is one of the first drama schools in the area.

== Etymology ==
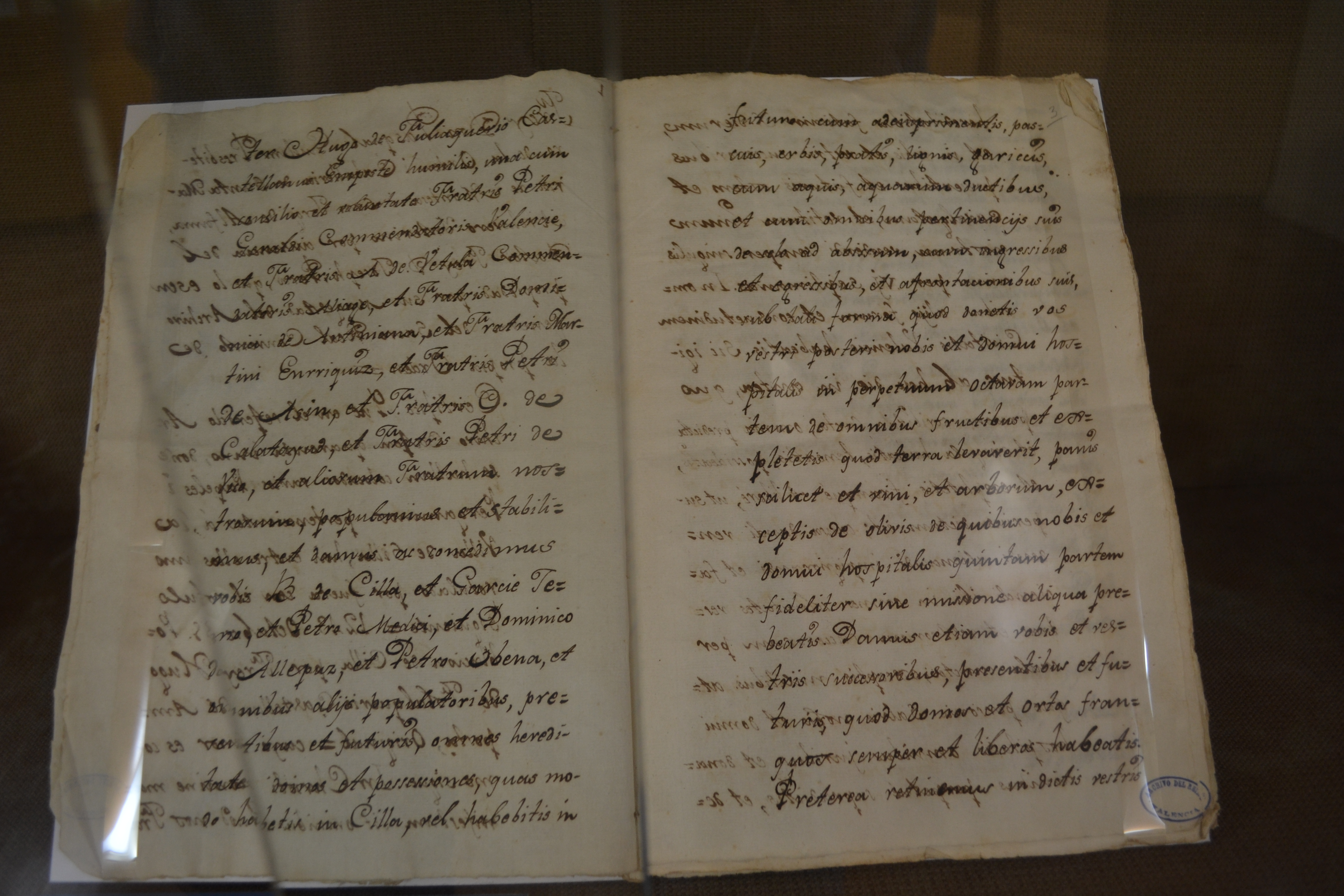
Municipal charter of Silla (1243)

The etymology of Silla is not known for certain. Some say that it comes from the Arabic Sila, others say from Latin, and still others from Valencian meaning "the island". Among these three theories, the most commonly accepted one is that it comes from Latin, as it has been proved that there was a Roman cellar where the town is situated now.

== Notable people ==
- Marina Cortelles (2007-), rhythmic gymnast
- Juan María de la Cruz (1891-1936), priest, was executed here during the Spanish Civil War
- Javi Moreno (1974-), former footballer

== See also ==
- List of municipalities in Valencia
