= San Esteban de los Patos =

- municipality
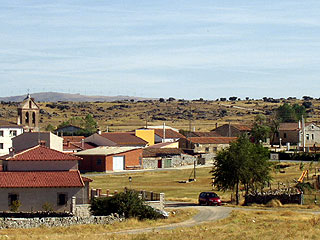

- Coat of arms

- Location in Spain. San Esteban de los Patos (Spain)
- Coordinates: 40°44′45″N 4°37′30″W
- Country: Spain
- Autonomous community: Castile and León
- Province: Ávila

Area
  - Total: 10 km^{2} (3.9 sq mi)

Population (2025-01-01)
  - Total: 19
  - Density: 1.9/km^{2} (4.9/sq mi)
- Time zone: UTC+1 (CET)
  - Summer (DST): UTC+2 (CEST)
- Website: Official website

San Esteban de los Patos is a municipality located in the province of Ávila, Castile and León, Spain.

== Population ==
Historical population
Year	Pop.	±% p.a.
2023	20	—
2024	20	+0.00%
2025	19	−5.00%
Source: INE

== Notable people ==
- Blessed Juan María de la Cruz, priest and martyr

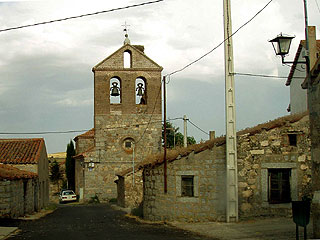
San Esteban de los Patos church.

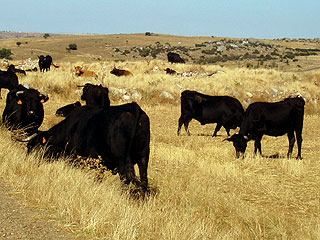
Avileña-Black Iberian cows grazing in the municipality in summer.

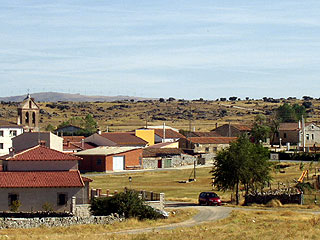
View of San Esteban de los Patos.
