= Vicenta María López i Vicuña =

Spanish professed religious

Saint Vicenta María López y Vicuña
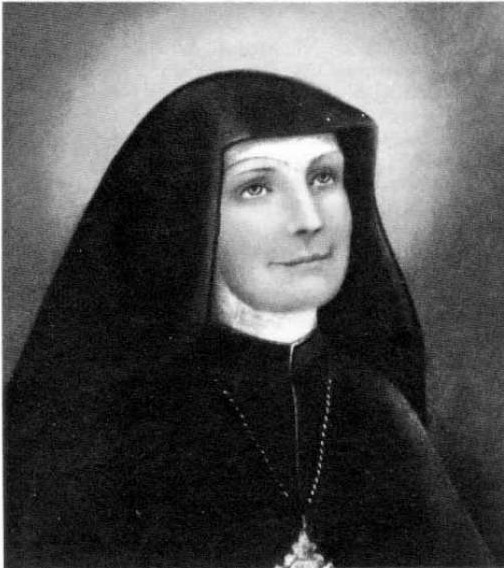
- Vicenta María López y Vicuña
- Born: 22 March 1847; Cascante, Navarra, Kingdom of Spain
- Died: 26 December 1890 (aged 43); Madrid, Kingdom of Spain
- Venerated in: Roman Catholic Church
- Beatified: 19 February 1950, Saint Peter's Basilica, Vatican City by Pope Pius XII
- Canonized: 25 May 1975, Saint Peter's Square, Vatican City by Pope Paul VI
- Feast: 26 December

Vicenta María López y Vicuña (22 March 1847 - 26 December 1890) was a Spanish professed religious and the founder of the Religious of Mary Immaculate. Her order was dedicated to administering to "working girls", or young women in domestic employment, and she took the view that these housemaids and other domestic servants needed care, with a particular emphasis on girls who suffered abuse.

Pope Pius XII presided over her beatification in 1950 and Pope Paul VI later proclaimed her to be a saint in 1975.

== Life ==
Vicenta María López y Vicuña was born on 22 March 1847 in Cascante to José Maria Lopez Jiménez and Nicolasa Vicuña. Her brother was Manuel María Vicuña. His maternal aunt and his priest great-uncle oversaw her religious education.

In 1866 she refused to entertain the notion of an arranged marriage and she instead decided to take a private vow to remain chaste while also realizing she had an inner calling to the religious life. For a time she lived with her maternal aunt Eulalia de Vicuña who had founded a home for domestic servants and with her aunt helped to form a group of women in order to administer to working girls.

The rule for that group was soon composed and on 11 June 1876 founded her own religious order to that end. In 1878 professed her vows alongside three others as a nun. The order received papal approval on 18 April 1888 from Pope Leo XIII after it received diocesan approval on 18 April 1876.

She died on 26 December 1890.

== Beatification process ==
The informative process opened in Madrid in 1915 under Prudencio Melo i Alcalde who had opened the process and later concluded it in 1919 while theologians approved all of her spiritual works on 20 May 1924; the informative process received the validation of the Congregation of Rites on 19 July 1939. The formal introduction to the cause came under Pope Pius XI on 18 July 1928 and she was titled as a Servant of God.

An antepreparatory congregation approved the cause on 4 February 1941 while a preparatory congregation followed suit on 28 April 1942; a general congregation had the final say and also approved it on 12 January 1943 which would allow for the Congregation of the Rites. to present it to the pope for his approval. Pope Pius XII approved that the late nun lived a life of heroic virtue and named her as venerabke on 21 March 1943. Pius XII later beatified her on 19 February 1950 and issued a decree of resumption for the cause on 14 March 1952; Pope Paul VI canonized her as a saint on 25 May 1975.
