= Léon Dehon =

French religious priest

Venerable Léon Dehon SCJ
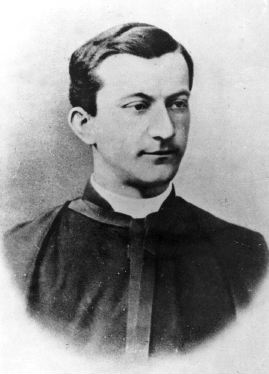
- Léon Dehon in 1908
- Born: Léon-Gustave Dehon; 14 March 1843; La Capelle, Soissons, French Kingdom
- Died: 12 August 1925 (aged 82); Brussels, Belgium

Léon-Gustave Dehon, SCJ (14 March 1843 – 12 August 1925), religious name Jean of the Sacred Heart, was a French religious priest of the Congregation of the Sacred Heart of Jesus, which he founded.

Dehon's focus in his ecclesial life was to express his closeness with workers but he especially promoted a devotion to the Most Sacred Heart of Jesus.

He established the Congregation of the Sacred Heart of Jesus in 1878, dedicated to this task and to working in the foreign and diocesan missions in France and abroad. But impediments caused the congregation's dissolution. Dehon later reformed and reestablished it in 1884, leading the congregation until his death. It expanded to North and South America in the early 20th century.

== Life ==
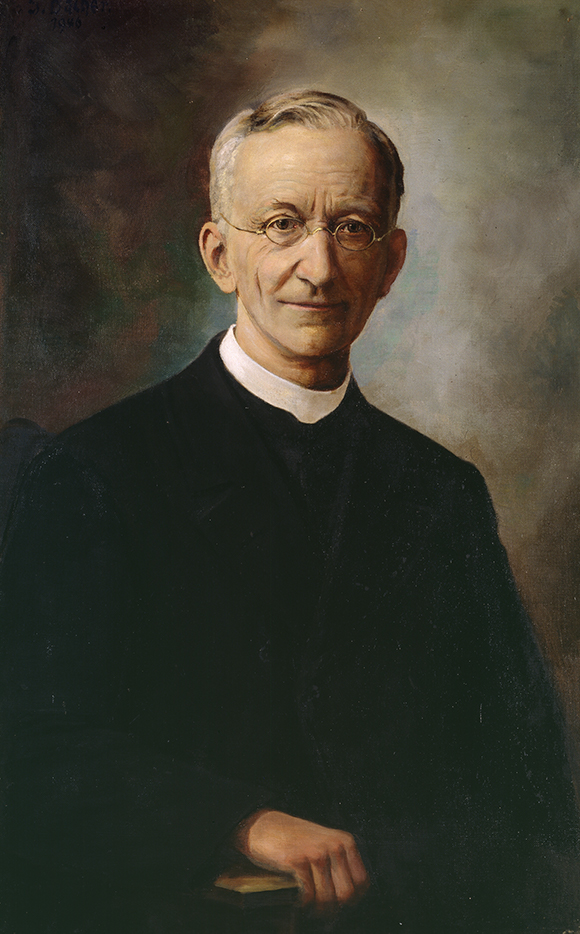
Dehon around 1920

=== Education ===
Léon-Gustave Dehon was born in La Capelle in Soissons on 14 March 1843 to Alexandre-Jules Dehon (1814–82) and Stephanie Vandelet. His baptism was celebrated on 24 March 1843. Dehon's mother fostered a deep devotion to the Sacred Heart and encouraged her son in this practice. He received his First Communion on 4 June 1854 and was Confirmed on 1 June 1857.

In 1855 he was sent to the college at Hazebrouck, where he studied under noted priest Jacques Dehaene, and graduated in August 1859. In his adolescence Dehon felt called to the priesthood (which manifested at Christmas 1865), but his father sent him to the Sorbonne in Paris. He earned a degree in civil law on 2 April 1864 (with top honors), after studying from 1860 to 1864. He had spent much of his free time in a local church.

His father sent him on a long tour of the East (including Palestine), but en route to return to France, Dehon found his call to the priesthood renewed. He entered the French Seminary of Saint Claire in Rome on 25 October 1865 to begin ecclesial studies. Before he entered, he had met with Pope Pius IX, who encouraged and blessed his vocation. Dehon referred to Pius IX as "goodness united with holiness".

Dehon obtained a bachelor of sciences on 16 August 1860. He began his theological studies at the Pontifical Gregorian and at the Pontifical Roman Athenaeum S. Apollinare. He obtained a doctorate in philosophical studies on 27 June 1866. After ordination, he continued his studies, earning an STD in theology on 13 June 1871 and a JCD in canon law on 24 July 1871.

=== Priesthood ===
Dehon was ordained to the priesthood on 19 December 1868 in the Basilica of Saint John Lateran. His father had come to terms with his son's vocation and returned to the Church following the ordination. Dehon celebrated his first Mass in Rome with both his parents present.

Dehon served as stenographer at the First Vatican Council (1869–1870). (He was one of four French priests to serve as such; Dehon's record of the proceedings was published as the Diario del Concilio Vaticano I in 1962.) Beginning on 16 November 1871, Dehon served as a parish priest, a curate, at Saint Quentin.

He had begun feeling drawn to communal religious life. He made a pilgrimage to Loreto in 1877 with Odon Thibaudier, Bishop of Soissons. On 28 June 1878 Dehon founded the Oblates of the Sacred Heart. He took the religious name "Jean of the Sacred Heart" upon the profession of his vows at the founding. He had begun his novitiate on 31 July 1877 prior to founding.

His new congregation grew at a rapid pace. It officially disbanded on 3 December 1883 with Dehon feeling, in his words, "torn to shreds". Following a period of depression and serious reflection, during which he undertook the Spiritual Exercises of Ignatius of Loyola, Dehon reformed the congregation.

It was founded as the Priests of the Sacred Heart in March 1884, known informally as the Dehonians after him, and its focus was parish and foreign mission work. Bishop of Soissons Thibaudier had intervened to restore the congregation, since he supported Dehon's work. In 1886 Dehon was elected as the congregation's Superior-General and held the position until his death.

Dehon ensured that another focus of the congregation was to promote a special devotion to Eucharistic adoration. The congregation received the decree of praise from Pope Leo XIII on 25 February 1888. In a 6 September audience, the pope asked Dehon to preach based on the pope's documents. The pope later appointed him in 1897 as a consultant to the Congregation of the Index. He said: "Let it be known that I approve his positions as I entrust him to the function of one who must judge the doctrine of others".

In 1889 Dehon started a magazine called Reign of the Sacred Heart. Though the Dehonians had secured the support of Leo XIII and his successors, until Pope Pius XI Dehon and the congregation's priests were accused of slander and various other charges. Dehon was criticised for his behaviour and relations with the diocese overall. He participated in congresses and conferences and founded new houses. He was especially noted for hearing confessions for long hours at a time.

Dehon began the construction of the Basilica del Sacro Cuore di Cristo Re in Rome (18.05.1920). Pius X had said of Dehon in 1906: "We are looking for saints. Here is one that is being born". Pius XI granted the congregation definitive papal approval in 1923.

In 1906 the congregation's motherhouse relocated to Brussels after passage of legislation in France in 1905 to establish Church-State separation. The new law resulted in difficulties for religious congregations, which often served as integral parts of local governments to administer welfare and operate schools. Dehon wrote numerous articles for newspapers and periodicals, and published books on social matters and devotional topics.

=== Death ===
In December 1914 Dehon drafted his will and spiritual testament. In 1925 he began suffering from gastroenteritis, which was very painful. Dehon died in Brussels on 12 August 1925 at 12:10pm. He reportedly pointed at an image of the Sacred Heart and his last words were: "For Him I lived; for Him I die. He is my everything, my life, my death, and my eternity".

== Beatification process ==
The process for Dehonian's beatification started in 1952. It was revived in the late 20th century, and information gathering included documentation of a miracle in South America. The process was halted in 2005 due to allegations by both clerical and secular sources that his published works were antisemitic in nature. He had been named as venerable on 8 March 1997.

=== Controversial publications ===
Dehon was noted as a prolific writer. He often wrote articles for various newspapers and periodicals on a wide range of different social issues, as well as devotional subjects such as the Sacred Heart. The latter was a predominant theme in several of his published works.

In the 21st century, the process of beatification of Dehon was underway and the first step was approved. But when Dehon was alleged to have expressed antisemitic views in his writings, this caused the suspension of the process until a reexamination of his writings could be undertaken.

On 5 February one French historian drew attention to seven controversial texts in which Dehon expressed anti-Semitic opinions. The French paper La Croix published extracts, in which Dehon wrote:

- Jews were "thirsty for gold"
- Jews' "lust for money is a racial instinct in them"
- The Talmud is "a manual for the bandit, the corrupter, and social destroyer"

Dehon also suggested in his writings that Jews should wear special markings, that ghettos should be re-established, and Jews be excluded from land ownership and teaching positions.

In his 1898 "Social Catechism", he said that Jewish people "favor enemies of the Church".

Before John Paul II's death in 2005, Cardinal Archbishop of Paris Jean-Marie Lustiger sent an urgent letter to Cardinal Joseph Ratzinger expressing alarm at Dehon's writings and asking for an examination. The French Episcopal Conference urged caution with the cause, and the French government warned that it would not send a representative to the beatification if it went ahead. Benedict XVI later ordered an urgent reexamination of Dehon's writings, with the first meeting scheduled for that 24 June. The pope tasked Cardinal José Saraiva Martins to lead the effort, and also appointed Cardinals Paul Poupard and Roger Etchegaray.

=== Further developments ===
Pope Francis on 5 June 2015 expressed his desire for Dehon's cause to proceed, referring to the founder of the Priests of the Sacred Heart as "the almost beatified Dehon". While anti-Semitism had been prevalent in Dehon's lifetime, the Catholic Church had worked to reduce this bias among its clergy and congregations following the disastrous Holocaust of World War II and the effort since to build more just societies. The pope said that attitudes must be viewed in their historical context, and said that he wanted the cause to "end well". Francis added that "it's a hermeneutic problem" that warranted an evaluation of the "hermeneutic of the time", rather than evaluating Dehon's writings through contemporary viewpoints.
