= Amalia Abad Casasempere =

Spanish Catholic martyr

Amalia Abad Casasempere (11 December 1897 – 21 September 1936) was a Catholic woman killed in Alcoy, Spain, during the Spanish Civil War. She was born in Alcoy and was a widow and mother of two daughters, and she was very active in the service of the church. She hid two nuns in her house at the outbreak of the civil war. For this she was arrested and executed by the militia. She was one of 233 people beatified by Pope John Paul II on 11 March 2001, as martyrs of the Spanish Civil War (the name given by the Catholic Church to those killed by Republicans because of their faith).

== Bibliography ==
- Vicent Gabarda Cebellán. 1996. The repression in the Republican rearguard: Valencian region, 1936-1939. Vol. 18 of Arxius i documents. Published by Edicions Alfons el Magnànim, Institució Valencian d'Estudis i Investigació, 374 pp.
