= Juan María de la Cruz =

Spanish Roman Catholic priest

Blessed Juan María de la Cruz S.C.I.
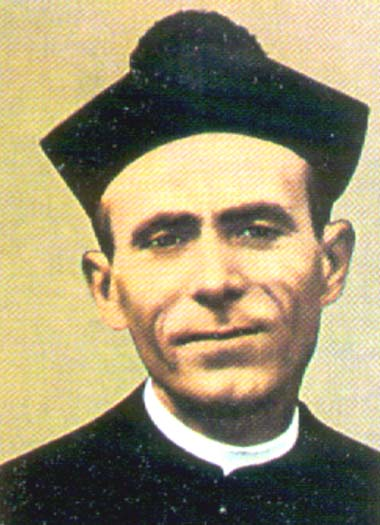

Priest and martyr
- Born: 25 September 1891
- Died: 23 August 1936 (aged 44)
- Venerated in: Roman Catholic Church (Priests of the Sacred Heart)
- Beatified: 11 March 2001, Saint Peter's Square, Vatican City by Pope John Paul II
- Feast: 26 November

Juan María de la Cruz, S.C.I. (born Mariano García Méndez, San Esteban de los Patos, Province of Ávila, 25 September 1891 – Silla, Valencia, 23 August 1936) was a Spanish Roman Catholic priest.

The Roman Catholic Church considers him a martyr. He was beatified by Pope John Paul II in 2001, together with his fellow martyrs killed in the Spanish Civil War.
