= Dehonians =

Catholic clerical religious congregation

Congregation of the Priests of the Sacred Heart of Jesus
- Congregatio Sacerdotum a Sacro Corde Iesu (Latin)
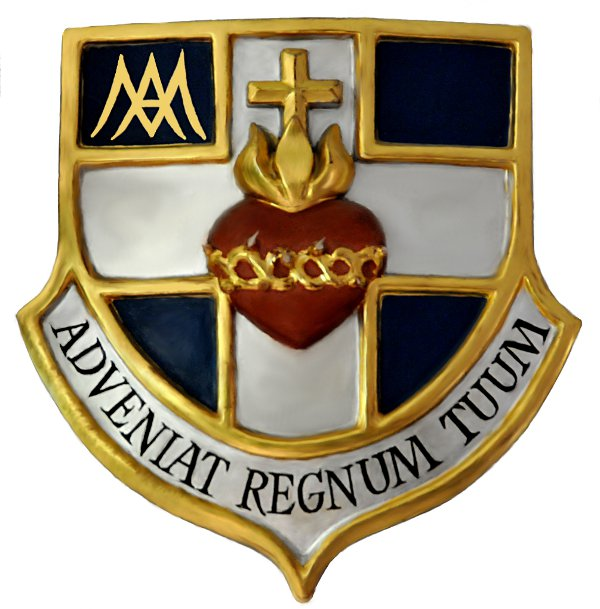
- Abbreviation: SCI
- Nickname: Dehonians
- Formation: June 28, 1878; 148 years ago
- Founder: Léon Dehon
- Founded at: St. Quentin, France
- Type: Clerical Religious Congregation of Pontifical Right for Men
- Headquarters: Via Casale S. Pio V, 20, Rome, Italy
- Members: 2,212 members (includes 1,579 priests) as of 2020
- Continents served: Europe, Africa, North and South America and Asia
- Superior General: Carlos Luis Suárez Codorniú
- Motto: Latin: Adveniat regnum tuum English: Thy Kingdom come
- Parent organization: Catholic Church
- Website: dehoniani.org
- Formerly called: Oblates of the Sacred Heart of Jesus

The Congregation of the Priests of the Sacred Heart of Jesus (Latin: Congregatio Sacerdotum a Sacro Corde Iesu), also called the Dehonians, is a Catholic clerical religious congregation of pontifical right for men.

== History ==
The order was founded in Saint-Quentin, Aisne, Picardy, France, by Léon Dehon in 1878. It is present in over 40 countries on five continents (Europe, Africa, North and South America and Asia). It is headquartered in Rome.

Carlos Luis Suarez Codorniú is the current superior general. In the United States, it is based in Hales Corners, Wisconsin. There it also operates the Sacred Heart School of Theology, the largest seminary in the United States for men over the age of 30 who are preparing for the priesthood.

Among other facilities, the Institute has owned and operated St. Joseph's Indian School in Chamberlain, South Dakota, since 1927. This is an off-reservation boarding school for grades K-8 that serves largely Lakota students.

== Superiors general ==
- Léon Dehon (28 June 1878 – 12 August 1925)
- Joseph Philippe (20 January 1926 – 24 October 1935)
- Theodorus Govaart (24 October 1935 – 7 September 1953)
- Alphons Lellig (11 January 1954 – 13 December 1958)
- Joseph de Palma (15 July 1959 – 6 June 1967)
- Albert Bourgeois (6 June 1967 – 6 June 1979)
- Antonio Panteghini (6 June 1979 – 24 May 1991)
- Virginio Bressanelli (24 May 1991 – 27 May 2003)
- José Ornelas Carvalho (27 May 2003 – 25 May 2015)
- Heiner Wilmer (25 May 2015 – 6 April 2018)
- Carlos Enrique Caamaño Martín (6 April 2018 – 20 July 2018)
- Carlos Luis Suarez Codorniú (20 July 2018 – )

== Sainthood causes ==
Blesseds

- Juan María de la Cruz (born Mariano García Méndez) (25 September 1891 – 23 August 1936), Martyr of the Spanish Civil War, beatified on 11 March 2001

Venerables

- Jean of the Sacred Heart (born Léon-Gustave Dehon) (14 March 1843 – 12 August 1925), founder of the Congregation, declared Venerable on 8 March 1997. beatification postponed due to his writings expressing antisemitism
- Antonio Vincenzo Gallo (11 January 1899 - 2 May 1934), oblate, declared Venerable on 9 April 1990
- Aloísio Sebastião Boeing (24 December 1913 - 17 April 2006), founder of the Marian Fraternity of the Heart of Jesus, declared Venerable on 23 February 2023
- Nicola (Martino) Capelli (20 September 1912 - 1 October 1944), martyr, declared Venerable on 21 November 2025

Servants of God

- André Prévot (9 November 1840 - 26 November 1913), priest
- Aquilino (Bernardo) Longo (25 August 1907 - 3 November 1964), martyr, declared as a Servant of God on 31 May 1993
- José Antônio do Couto (1 November 1927 - 30 July 1997), Bishop of Taubaté, declared as a Servant of God on 29 March 2012
- Léo Tarcísio Gonçalves Pereira (19 October 1961 - 4 January 2007), founder of the Bethânia Community

== Notable members ==
- Stanisław Nagy
- Eusébio Scheid
- Juan María de la Cruz
- André Prévot

== See also ==
- Congregation (Catholic)
- Catholic religious order
- Sacred Heart
- St. Joseph's Indian School
