= Religious of Mary Immaculate =

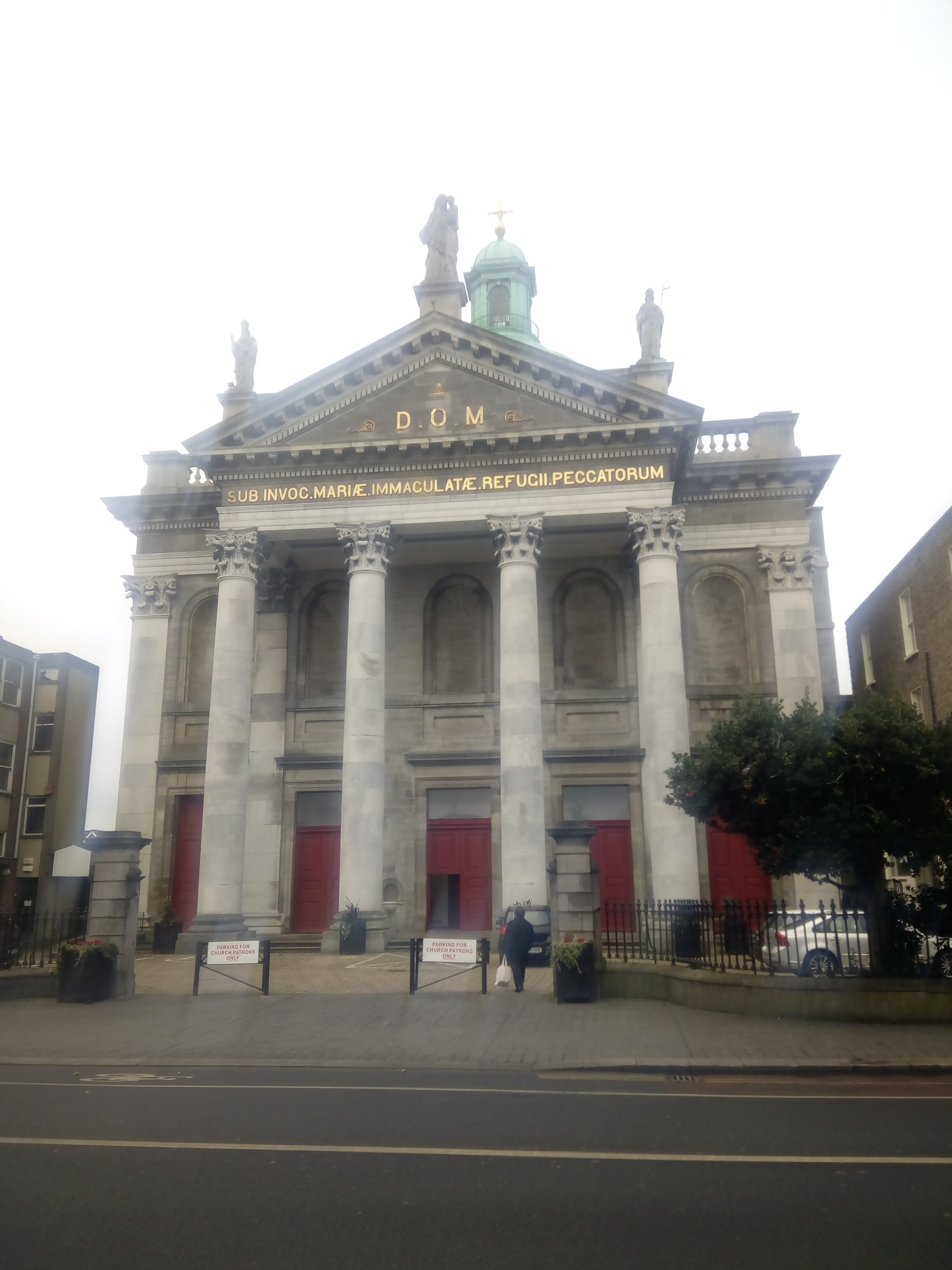
Church of Mary immaculate Dublin

The Religious of Mary Immaculate (Spanish: Religiosas de María Inmaculada, Servicio Doméstico; Latin: Institutum Religiosarum a Maria Immaculata pro puellis domestico famulatui addictis; abbreviation: R.M.I.) is a religious institute of pontifical right whose members profess public vows of chastity, poverty, and obedience and follow the evangelical way of life in common.

The work of this congregation is to conduct hospices for domestic working girls and to teach them domestic arts.

This religious institute was founded in Madrid, Spain, in 1876, by Saint Vincentia Maria López y Vicuña.

The sisters have houses in Africa, America, Asia and Europe. The Generalate of the Congregation can be found in Rome, Italy.

On 31 December 2005 there were 1367 sisters in 130 communities.
