= Teresa Jornet Ibars =

Roman Catholic saint

Saint Teresa Jornet Ibars HAD
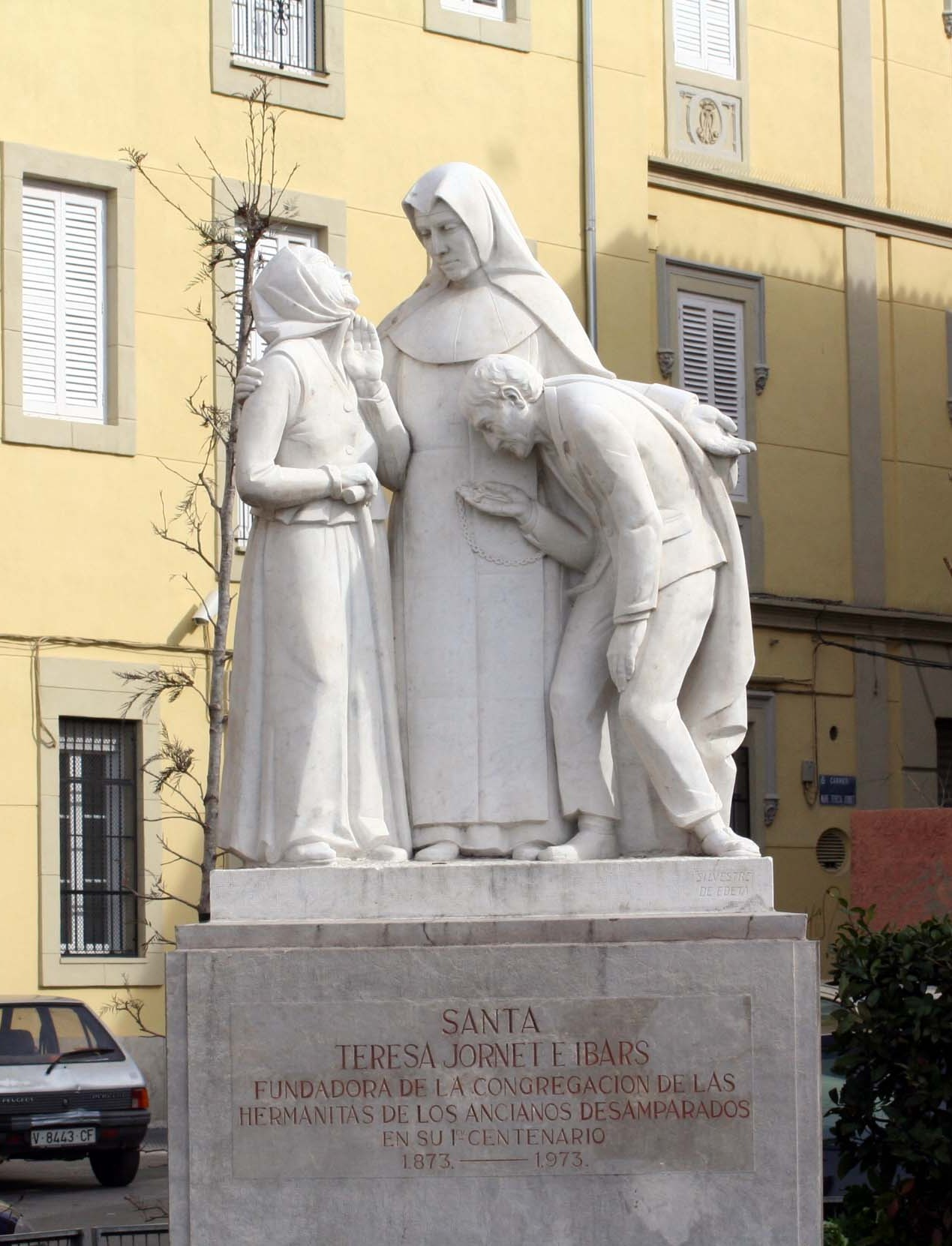
- Statue of Saint Teresa Jornet, next to a nursing home in Valencia, run by the Little Sisters of the Poor

Virgin
- Born: 9 January 1843; Aytona, Lleida, Catalonia, Kingdom of Spain
- Died: 26 August 1897 (aged 54); Liria, Valencia, Kingdom of Spain
- Venerated in: Catholic Church
- Beatified: 27 April 1958, Saint Peter's Basilica, Vatican City by Pope Pius XII
- Canonized: 27 January 1974, Saint Peter's Square, Vatican City by Pope Paul VI
- Feast: 26 August
- Patronage: persons of old age

Teresa Jornet Ibars, HAD (9 January 1843 – 26 August 1897), also known as Saint Teresa of Jesus, was a Spanish religious sister who founded of the Little Sisters of the Abandoned Elderly.

Ibars was the great-niece of Francisco Palau and a friend and confidante of Saturnino López Novoa. Her dedication to the old and ill was noted, and her sisters' work in Spain and later abroad.

Her beatification was celebrated by Pope Pius XII on 27 April 1958 in Saint Peter's Basilica. Pope Paul VI canonized Ibars in 1974.

== Life ==
Teresa Jornet Ibars was born on 9 January 1843 in a small town in Lleida to the farmers Francisco José Jornet and Antonieta Ibars. One of her sisters, Josefa, became a Vincentian in Havana. Her brother Juan had three daughters who later joined the congregation of the Little Sisters of the Abandoned Elderly. Ibars' great-uncle was Francisco Palau.

Ibars was baptized on 10 January 1843 and received confirmation in 1849. In her childhood, Ibars demonstrated a strong concern for the plight of the poor in her area, and she often took them to the home of her maternal aunt Rosa so that proper aid could be provided to them. She later moved elsewhere in Lleida to live with another aunt of hers and soon after, at the age of nineteen, began teaching at Argençola.

As she felt called to the monastic life, Ibars applied for admission to the Poor Clares near Burgos in 1868. However, the anti-clerical laws at the time prevented her from embracing the religious life. So in 1870, she became a member of the Third Order of our Lady of Mount Carmel. Her father's death and a severe illness she contracted later confined her to her home for a prolonged period. Father Pedro Llacera introduced her to Saturnino López i Novoa, who became her spiritual director. He encouraged her to aid the old of the region who needed proper attention.

On 11 October 1872, Ibars and her sister Maria moved to Barbastro with their friend Mercedes Calzada i Senan, and opened a house. Ibars founded a religious congregation, taking the religious name Teresa of Jesus in honor of Teresa of Ávila. She was vested in the habit on 27 January 1873 and appointed as the congregation's first superior. The motherhouse opened in Valencia on 8 May 1873. Ibars was confirmed as the superior in 1875 and made her perpetual vows on 8 December 1877. In 1887, she was appointed as the superior general for the congregation. On 14 June 1876, the papal decree of praise for the congregation came from Pope Pius IX while Pope Leo XIII issued formal approval on 24 August 1887. The general chapter for the congregation opened at Valencia on 23 April 1896, and Ibars was re-elected as superior general despite begging the sisters not to elect her once more.

Cholera broke out in 1897 across the nation. Ibars tended to the victims before she retired to the order's house at Liria, where she remained for the next few months. She met Novoa for the final time on 15 July 1897. Ibars died due to tuberculosis on 26 August 1897 in Liria, and her remains were housed in Liria until their transferral on 1 June 1904 to Valencia. On 25 August 1913, the relics were reinterred in the same location.

As of 2019, there were more than 2,000 religious sisters in 204 houses throughout 21 countries in Europe, Latin America, Africa, and Asia.

== Canonization ==
The beatification process opened in Valencia on 23 April 1945. It concluded on 7 March 1946. Theologians collated all of Ibar's writings and approved them as being in line with official doctrine in a decree issued on 16 March 1947. The informative process later received the validation from the Congregation of Rites on 25 June 1954. The formal introduction to the cause came on 27 June 1952, and Ibars was titled a Servant of God. On 22 January 1957, Pope Pius XII named her Venerable upon the confirmation that Ibars led a life of heroic virtue.

Pius XII beatified Ibars in Saint Peter's Basilica on 27 April 1958 upon the acknowledgment of two miracles attributed to her intercession while the confirmation of another two miracles in 1973 allowed for Pope Paul VI to canonize her on 27 January 1974. In 1977, Pope Paul proclaimed Teresa de Jesús the patron saint of old age in Spain.

== See also ==
- Saint Teresa Jornet Ibars, patron saint archive
