= Little Sisters of the Abandoned Elderly =

The Little Sisters of the Abandoned Elderly (Spanish: Hermanitas de los Ancianos Desamparados; Latin: Congregatio Parvarum Sororum Senium Derelictorum; abbreviation: H.A.D.) is a religious institute of pontifical right whose members profess public vows of chastity, poverty, and obedience and follow the evangelical way of life in common.

Members dedicate themselves to the care of the elderly.

This religious institute was founded in Barbastro, Spain, in 1872, by Saint Teresa of Jesus, and her collaborator Saturnino López Novoa.

The sisters have houses in Africa, Europe and Latin America. The Generalate of the Congregation can be found in Valencia, Spain.

As of 31 December 2005 there were 2527 sisters in 210 communities.
